= List of Hawke's Bay representative cricketers =

List of cricketers

This is a list of all cricketers who played first-class cricket for the Hawke's Bay cricket team in New Zealand. Seasons given are first and last seasons; the player did not necessarily play in all the intervening seasons.

== A ==
- John A'Deane, 1893/94
- Cyril Allcott, 1920/21
- Norman James Cecil Anderson, 1909/10
- Rudolph Godfreid Anderson, 1919/20
- Ernest Andrews, 1898/99
- Peter Ashcroft, 1905/06–1911/12
- William Martin Ashton, 1883/84
- Hendrick Osborne Audinwood, 1906/07

== B ==
- Bert Bailey, 1905/06–1910/11
- Arthur Merritt Beale, 1893/94–1895/96
- F Bell, 1886/87
- Arthur Cochrane Bennett, 1892/93–1896/97
- Bill Bernau, 1914/15
- John Alick Betts, 1908/09
- Bob Bishop, 1914/15–1920/21
- Larry Bishop, 1903/04
- Henry Blamires, 1911/12–1913/14
- Roland George Blinko, 1913/14
- Jack Board, 1910/11–1914/15
- Frederick Bottrell, 1912/13
- Walter William Boulnois, 1912/13
- Jim Bradburn, 1919/20–1920/21
- Robert Braithwaite, 1885/86
- Edward Tauria Broughton, 1883/84
- Sydney Cecil Brownette, 1910/11–1912/13
- Ralph Willett Bruce, 1891/92–1896/97
- William Beverly Buchanan, 1884/85
- James Buck, 1886/87–1887/88

== C ==
- Colin Campbell, 1920/21
- Frank Cane, 1920/21
- Davis Canning, 1893/94–1899/1900
- Charlie Cato, 1891/92–1907/08
- Robert Chadwick, 1913/14
- Leonard Andrews Charles, 1919/20
- William Vernon Clarke, 1913/14
- N Cohen, 1919/20
- Basil Walter Cotterill, 1901/02–1908/09
- George Robert Cotterill, 1899/1900
- Tommy Creed, 1910/11–1913/14
- Hugh Edward Crosse, 1919/20

== D ==
- Dick Dalgleish, 1906/07–1907/08
- David Davis, 1920/21
- Kenrick Holt Dean, 1914/15
- Tom Dent, 1900/01–1901/02
- John Downes, 1884/85
- John Drummond, 1903/04

== E ==
- Herbert Douglas Earney, 1910/11
- Charles Edwards, 1884/85–1887/88
- Harry Ellis, 1913/14–1914/15

== F ==
- Harry Fannin, 1892/93–1899/1900
- Arthur Fenton, 1903/04–1910/11
- George Henry Fernley, 1893/94
- Walter Philip Finch, 1884/85
- Alexander Abercrombie Freeman, 1887/88
- Peter Robertson Fulton, 1900/01–1920/21
- Frederick Fulton, 1883/84

== G ==
- Samuel James Geake, 1913/14–1914/15
- Clifton Stewart Geddis, 1914/15–1920/21
- William Alexander James Gibson, 1895/96–1897/98
- Joseph Jarvis Gifford, 1919/20–1920/21
- Harold Desmond Gold–Smith, 1905/06
- Arthur Gore, 1891/92–1901/02
- Frederick Herbert Gossage, 1893/94
- Milton Reid Grant, 1911/12
- Cyril John Gregory, 1883/84

== H ==
- WK Hall, 1904/05–1905/06
- Dick Hallamore, 1898/99–1906/07
- George Hawke, 1900/01–1910/11
- Bill Hawkins, 1887/88–1894/95
- W Hayward, 1885/86–1886/87
- Fitz Hill, 1891/92–1901/02
- Jack Hindmarsh, 1907/08–1913/14
- Harris Hindmarsh, 1920/21
- William Henry Hitchens, 1913/14
- Arthur George Howe, 1886/87
- Arthur Howard, 1904/05–1905/06
- Bill Hughes, 1891/92–1905/06
- James Hussey, 1901/02

== J ==
- Norman Jacobsen, 1919/20–1920/21
- J Johnson, 1919/20
- Charles Edgar Johnston, 1896/97

== K ==
- Roland Ralph Kennedy, 1920/21

== L ==
- Fred Laws, 1897/98
- Charles Levers, 1908/09
- Thomas William Lewis, 1896/97–1898/99
- WJ Love, 1920/21
- Thomas Lowry, 1891/92
- Edward Reginald Ludbrook, 1891/92–1895/96
- Hugh Lusk, 1891/92–1908/09

== M ==
- Mac Macassey, 1900/01–1912/13
- George Marshall, 1893/94–1901/02
- A Martin, 1896/97–1897/98
- Harry Martin, 1883/84–1897/98
- James Henry Martin, 1883/84–1896/97
- Bert Miller, 1914/15
- Charles Mills, 1919/20
- George Mills, 1894/95

== N ==
- Eric John Napier, 1913/14–1920/21
- Richard George Nash, 1886/87
- Frank Nelson, 1908/09–1909/10
- Frederick Montague Nelson, 1892/93–1897/98
- James Nelson, 1912/13
- Gollan McLean Newton, 1883/84–1886/87

== O ==
- Jack O'Brien, 1905/06–1920/21
- William James O'Connell, 1919/20–1920/21
- Joe Ongley, 1901/02

== P ==
- James Paterson, 1914/15–1920/21
- Logan Paterson, 1886/87–1887/88
- Gavin Graham Peacock, 1891/92
- Richard William Percy, 1884/85–1892/93
- George Prain, 1887/88

== R ==
- Philip Stanley Reaney, 1905/06
- Bill Redgrave, 1906/07–1908/09
- Arthur Rees, 1896/97
- Joseph P. Riley, 1885/86
- B Ryan, 1903/04–1910/11

== S ==
- Popham Sainsbury, 1893/94–1894/95
- William Salmon, 1885/86
- Harry Seed, 1913/14
- Herbert Sharp, 1904/05
- Charles Smith, 1891/92–1892/93
- Edward Smyrk, 1909/10–1912/13
- Roy Spackman, 1913/14–1919/20
- John Spivey, 1884/85–1885/86
- George Staite, 1895/96–1897/98
- George Robert Stevens, 1911/12–1920/21
- John Stevens, 1919/20
- Arthur Stubbs, 1887/88

== T ==
- John Taiaroa, 1891/92–1898/99
- Ernest Denton Tanner, 1883/84–1885/86
- Harry Fleetwood Thompson, 1885/86
- W Torkington, 1904/05
- Herbert Tottenham, 1903/04
- Albert Trott, 1901/02
- Charles Tuke, 1884/85
- Hugh Tuke, 1904/05
- Tommy Creed, 1910/11

== V ==
- Leslie George Vivian, 1912/13

== W ==
- George Mason White, 1884/85–1905/06
- Norman Moore White, 1907/08
- Peter White, 1910/11
- Allen Marsh Williams, 1883/84
- George Coldham Williams, 1883/84
- Heathcote Williams, 1891/92
- Heathcote Beetham Williams, 1891/92–1894/95
- John Williams, 1903/04
- FE Wilson, 1893/94
- Harry Wilson, 1896/97–1900/01
- Jack Wolstenholme, 1886/87–1898/99
- James Wood, 1884/85–1886/87

== Y ==
- William Charles Yates, 1883/84
- Billy Young, 1896/97–1905/06
