= List of World Series Cricket venues =

== 1977/78 ==
=== Supertests & International Cup ===
Venue	Image	City	Supertests	One Day
Football Park		Adelaide, South Australia	2	3
Gloucester Park		Perth, Western Australia	0	2
RAS Showground		Sydney, New South Wales	1	4
VFL Park		Melbourne, Victoria	1	4

=== Country Cup ===
- Association Ground, Rockhampton, Queensland
- Kardinia Park, Geelong, Victoria
- Manuka Oval, Canberra, ACT
- Mildura City Oval, Victoria
- Queen Elizabeth II Oval, Bendigo, Victoria
- Wade Park, Orange, New South Wales
- Deakin Reserve, Shepparton, Victoria
- Albury Sports Ground, Albury, New South Wales
- Melville Oval, Hamilton, Victoria
- Oakes Oval, Lismore, New South Wales
- Sports Ground, Maitland, New South Wales,

=== Other Matches ===
- Moorabbin Oval, Melbourne, Victoria
- Girdlestone Park, Devonport, Tasmania
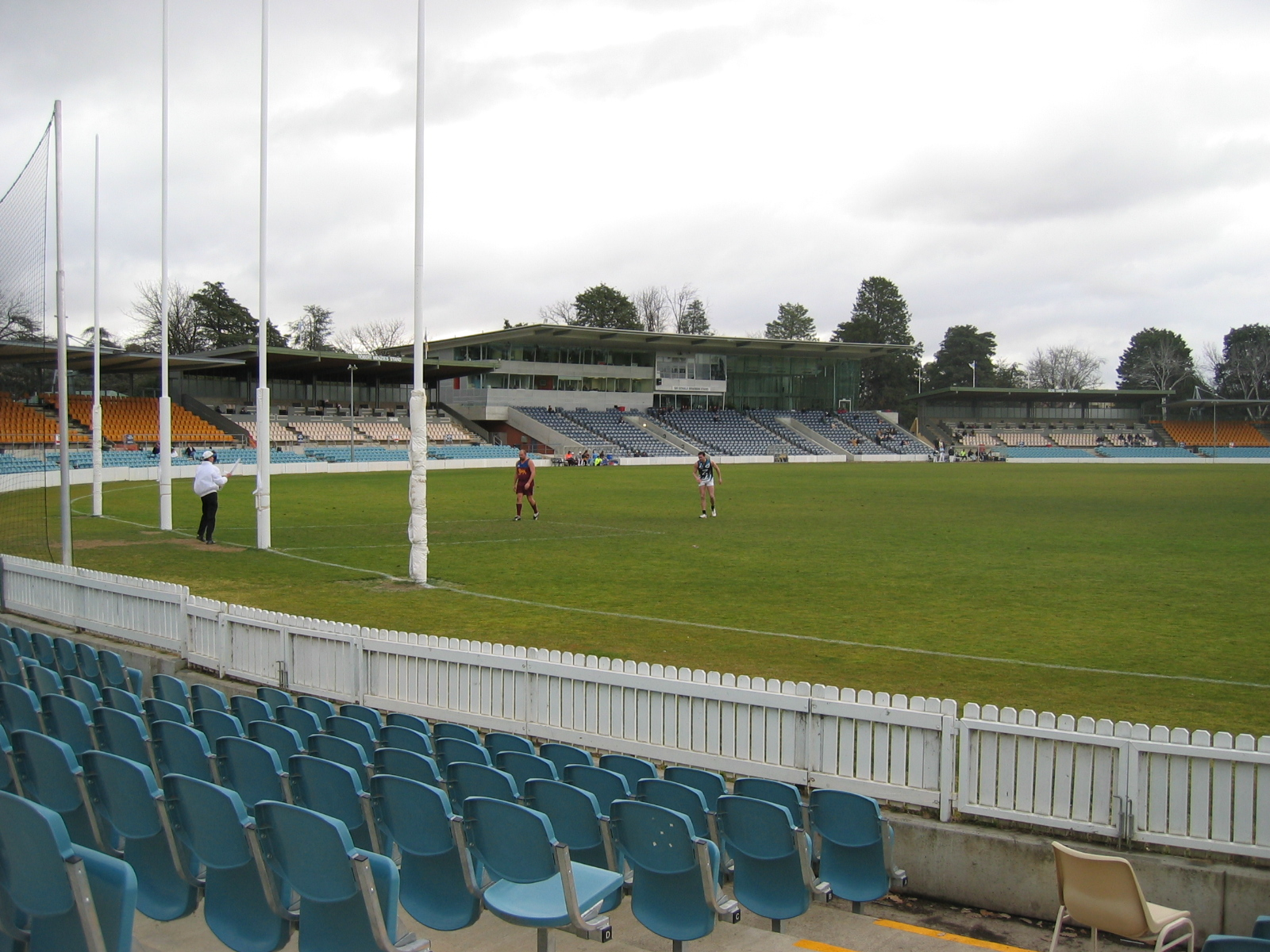
Manuka Oval

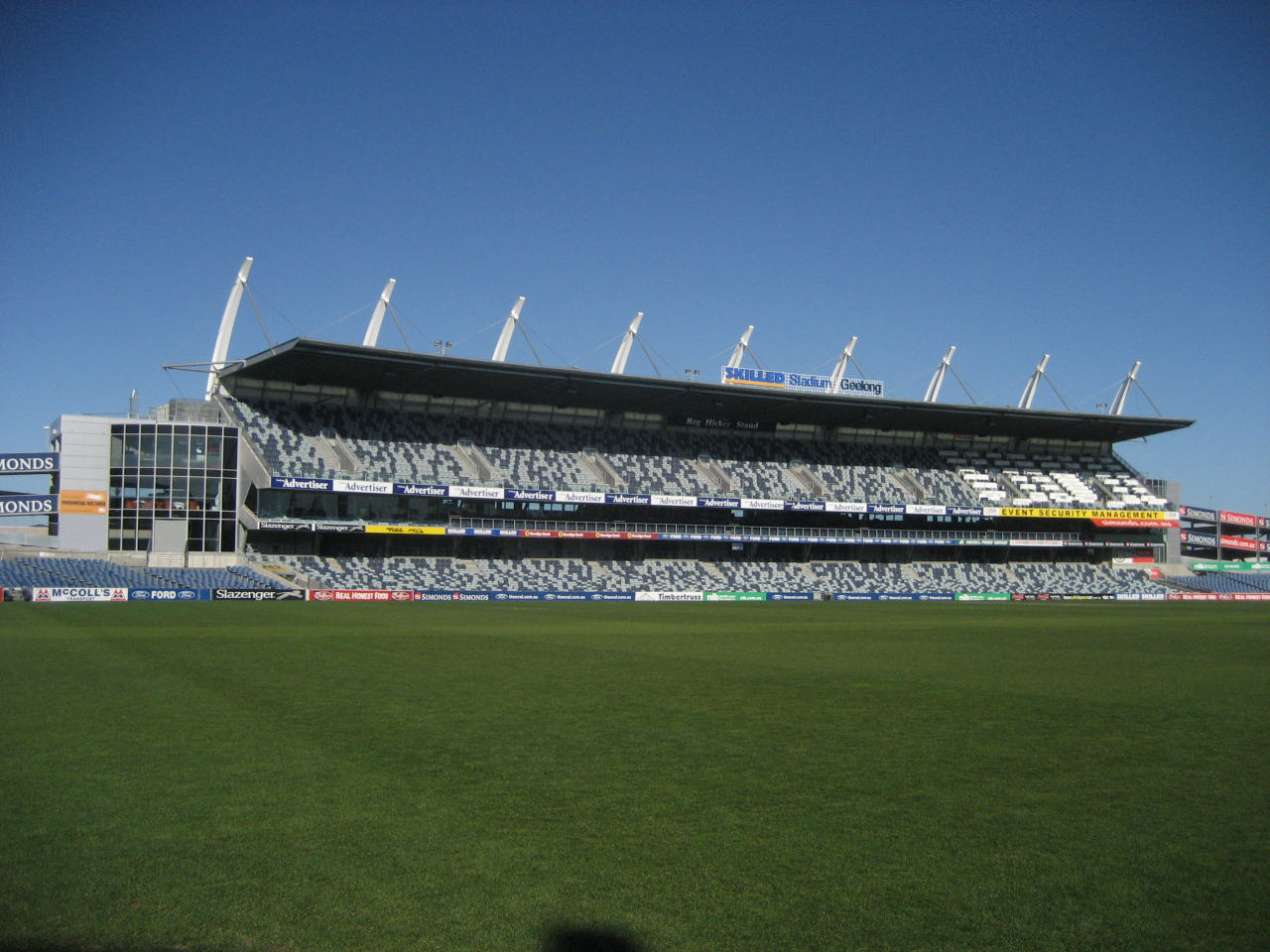
Kardinia Park

== 1978/79 ==
=== Supertests & International Cup ===
Venue	Image	City	Supertests	One Day
Brisbane Cricket Ground		Brisbane, Queensland	0	2
Football Park		Adelaide, South Australia	0	1
Oxley Oval		Port Macquarie, New South Wales	0	1
Sydney Cricket Ground		Sydney, New South Wales	2	5
VFL Park		Melbourne, Victoria	1	8

=== Cavaliers Country Tour ===
Venues for this year's Country Tour were usually small football ovals and sometimes cricket ovals in public parks. The venues below are listed in order of their use on the tour.

- Sir Richard Moore Sports Centre, Kalgoorlie, Western Australia
- Recreation Reserve, Bunbury, Western Australia
- Barlow Park, Cairns, Queensland
- Endeavour Park, Townsville, Queensland
- Ray Mitchell Oval, Harrup Park, Mackay, Queensland
- Association Ground, Rockhampton, Queensland
- Queensland Alumina Sports Club Oval, Gladstone, Queensland
- Salk Oval, Currumbin, Queensland
- Gold Park, Toowoomba, Queensland
- Sports Ground, Maitland, New South Wales
- Traralgon Showground, Victoria
- Football Park, Morwell, Victoria
- No. 1 Sports Ground, Newcastle, New South Wales
- Oakes Oval, Lismore, New South Wales
- Mildura City Oval, Victoria
- Queen Elizabeth II Oval, Bendigo, Victoria
- No 1 Oval, Tamworth, New South Wales
- Moran Oval, Armidale, New South Wales
- Wade Park, Orange, New South Wales
- Robertson Oval, Wagga Wagga, New South Wales
- Albury Sports Ground, Albury, New South Wales
- Melville Oval, Hamilton, Victoria
- Girdlestone Park, Devonport, Tasmania
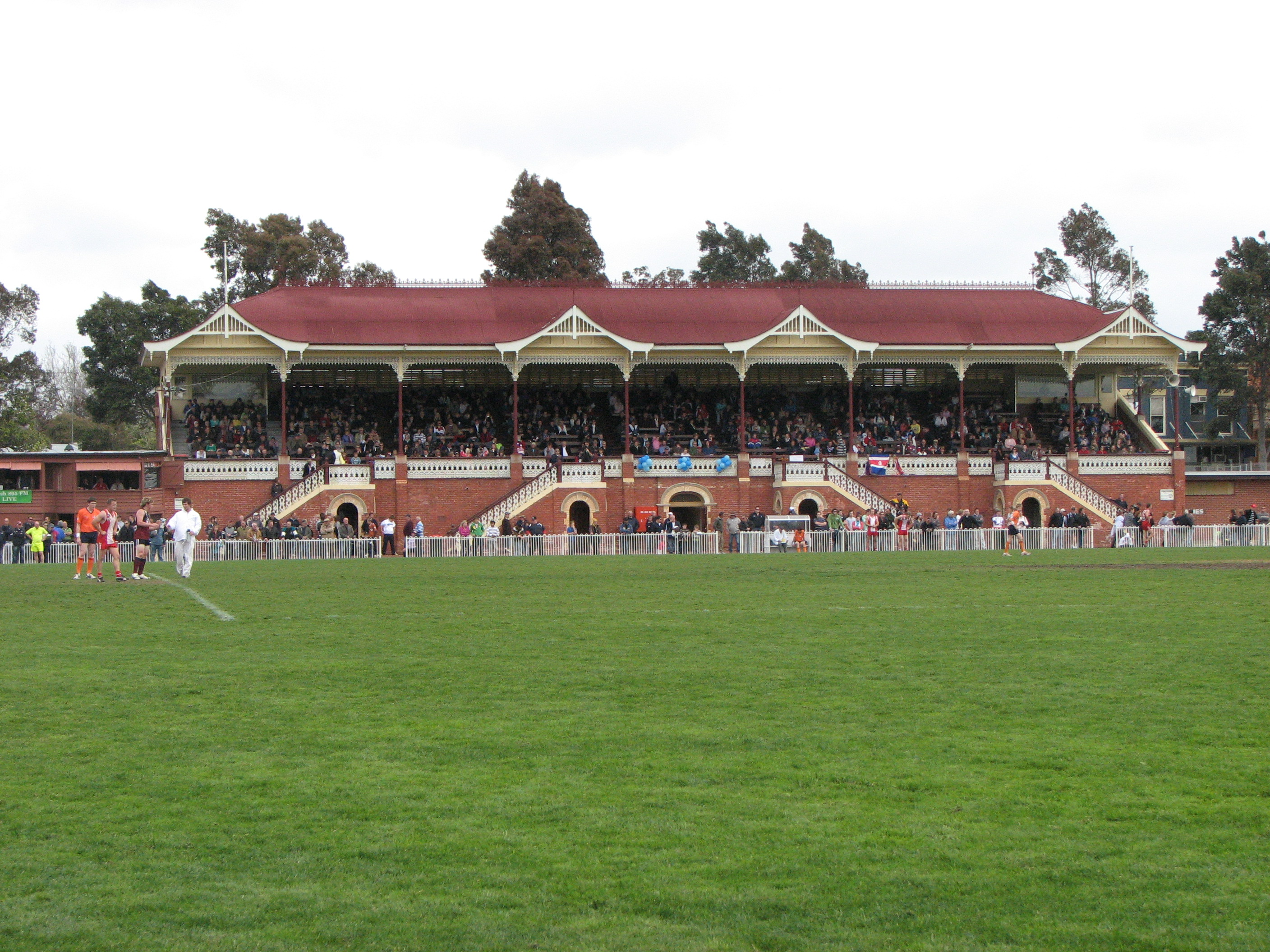
Queen Elizabeth Oval

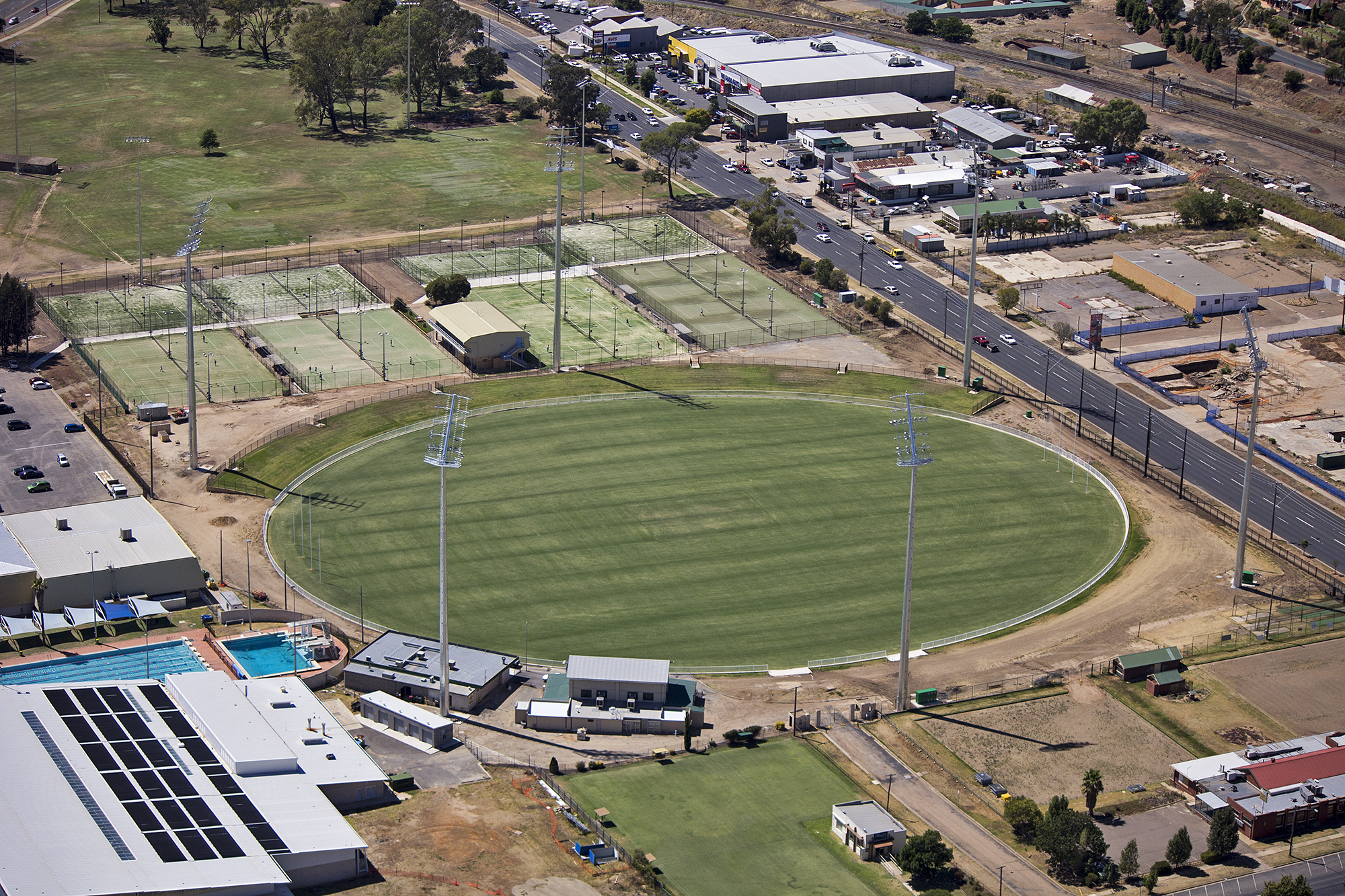
Robertson Oval

=== Swan Channel 9 Cup ===
- Gloucester Park, Perth, Western Australia

=== Other Matches ===
- The Gabba, Brisbane, Queensland
- Sydney Cricket Ground, New South Wales
- Football Park, Adelaide, South Australia
- Manuka Oval, Canberra, ACT
- Robertson Oval, Wagga Wagga, New South Wales

== New Zealand Tour ==
Venue	Image	City	Supertests	One Day
Cooks Gardens		Wanganui, Manawatū-Whanganui	0	2
Nelson Cricket Ground		Hastings, Hawke's Bay	0	1
Tauranga Domain Outer Ground		Tauranga, Bay of Plenty	0	1
Mount Smart Stadium		Penrose, Auckland	1	2
Pukekura Park		New Plymouth, Taranaki	0	1
Te Whiti Park		Lower Hutt, Wellington	0	1

== West Indies Tour ==
Venue	Image	City	Supertests	One Day
Albion Sports Complex		Berbice, Guyana	0	1
Antigua Recreation Ground		St. John's, Antigua and Barbuda	1	0
Bourda		Georgetown, Guyana	1	0
Kensington Oval		Bridgetown, Barbados	1	2
Mindoo Phillip Park		Castries, St Lucia	0	2
Queens Park Oval		Port of Spain, Trinidad and Tobago	1	3
Sabina Park		Kingston, Jamaica	1	2
Warner Park		Basseterre, St Kitts	0	1
Windsor Park		Roseau, Dominica	0	1
