= Redgrave =

Redgrave may refer to:

== People ==
- Redgrave family, a British family of actors and actresses
  - Roy Redgrave (1873–1922)
  - Michael Redgrave (1908–1985)
  - Vanessa Redgrave (born 1937)
  - Corin Redgrave (1939–2010)
  - Lynn Redgrave (1943–2010)
  - Jemma Redgrave (born 1965)
- Angela Redgrave (1917–2024), British dance teacher
- Bill Redgrave (1881–1931), New Zealand cricketer
- Richard Redgrave (1804–1888), English landscape artist and painter
- Samuel Redgrave (1802–1876), English civil servant and writer on art
- Sidney Redgrave (1878–1958), Australian cricketer
- Steve Redgrave (born 1962), Olympic rowing champion
- William Redgrave (1903–1986), British sculptor

=== Fictional characters ===
- Antonio and Luka Redgrave, characters in the video game series Bayonetta
- Tony Redgrave, an alias of Dante in the video game series Devil May Cry

== Places ==
- Redgrave (railway point), British Columbia
- Redgrave, Suffolk, a village and civil parish in England containing the historic Redgrave Manor, Redgrave Park, Redgrave Hall, and Redgrave Park Farm
- Redgrave and Lopham Fens, a biological Site of Special Scientific Interest between Thelnetham in Suffolk and Diss in Norfolk
- Redgrave Pinsent Rowing Lake, a rowing lake in the United Kingdom
- Redgrave Theatre, Farnham, a theatre in Surrey from 1974 to 1998
