= Herbert Sharp =

New Zealand cricketer and New Zealand Army soldier

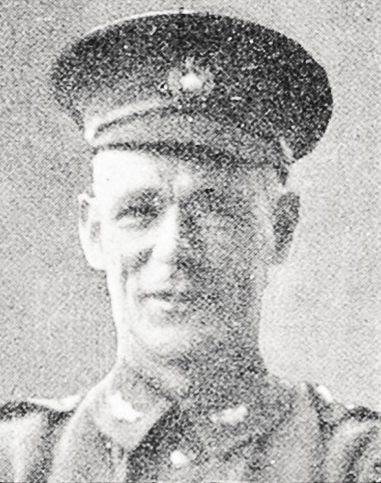

Personal information
- Full name: Herbert Hastings Sharp
- Born: 23 July 1881; Blackheath, Kent, England
- Died: 1 September 1918 (aged 37); Bancourt, Pas-de-Calais, France
- Batting: Unknown

Domestic team information
- Years: Team
- 1904/05: Hawke's Bay

Career statistics
Competition	First-class
Matches	1
Runs scored	14
Batting average	7.00
100s/50s	–/–
Top score	13
Catches/stumpings	1/–
- Source: Cricinfo, 31 March 2021

Herbert Hastings Sharp (23 July 1881 – 1 September 1918) was an English-born New Zealand first-class cricketer and New Zealand Army soldier.

The son of Hastings Sharp, he was born in July 1881 at Blackheath, Kent. He was educated at St. Lawrence College, Ramsgate. Sharp immigrated to New Zealand around 1901, where he gained employment with a Mr. Carlyon. He was a cricket enthusiast, playing club cricket in Poverty Bay. Sharp appeared once in first-class cricket, playing for Hawke's Bay against Auckland at Auckland Domain in 1905. In a heavy defeat for Hawke's Bay, he made scores of 13 and 1, being dismissed by Jocelyn Kallender and William Stemson respectively.

Sharp served in the First World War, seeing action on the Western Front in the New Zealand Expeditionary Force as a corporal with the 26th Reinforcements. He was killed in action on 1 September 1918 near Bancourt during the Second Battle of Bapaume. He is buried at the Bancourt British Cemetery.
