= World Series Cricket tour of New Zealand =

Australia against World XI in New Zealand
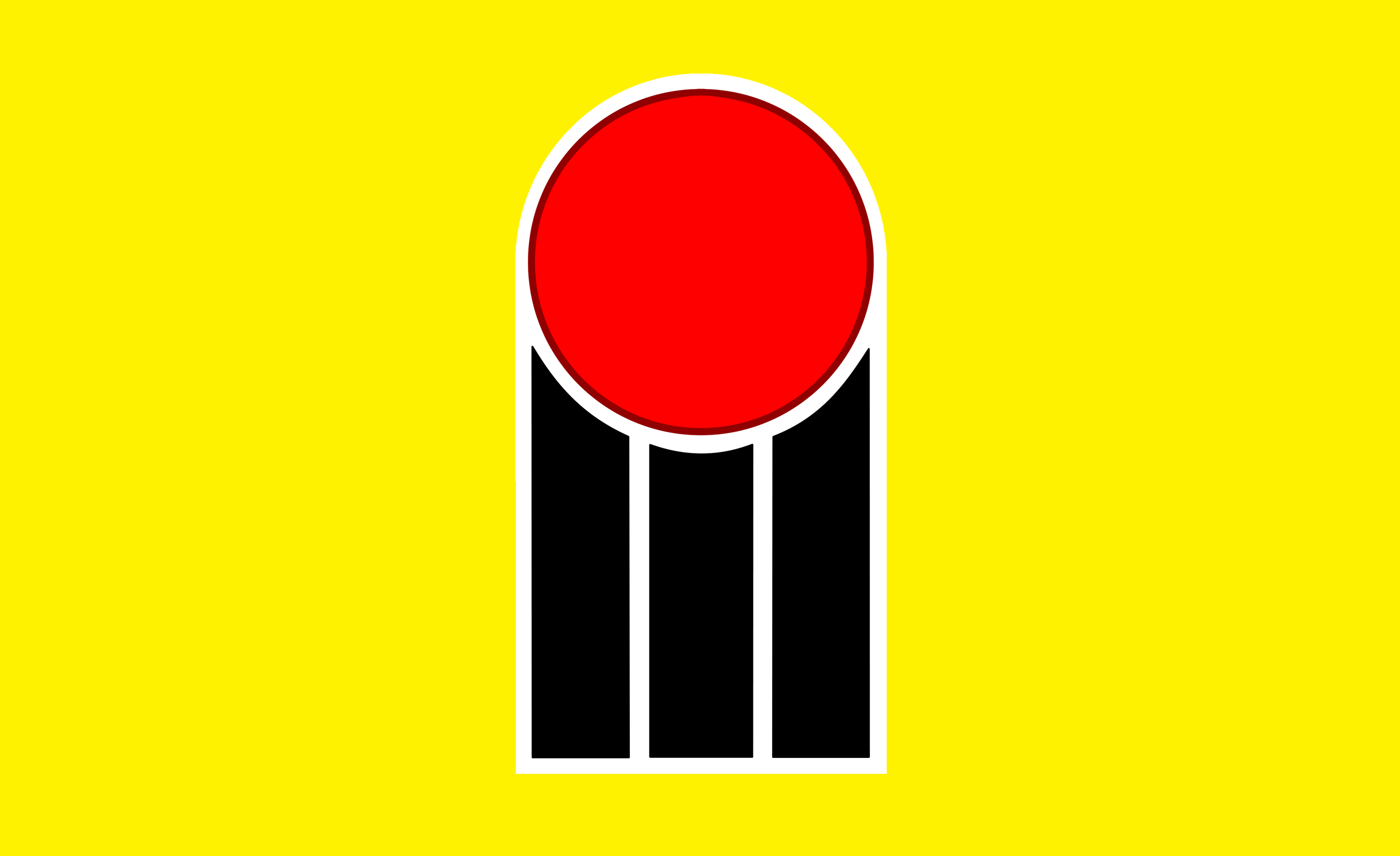
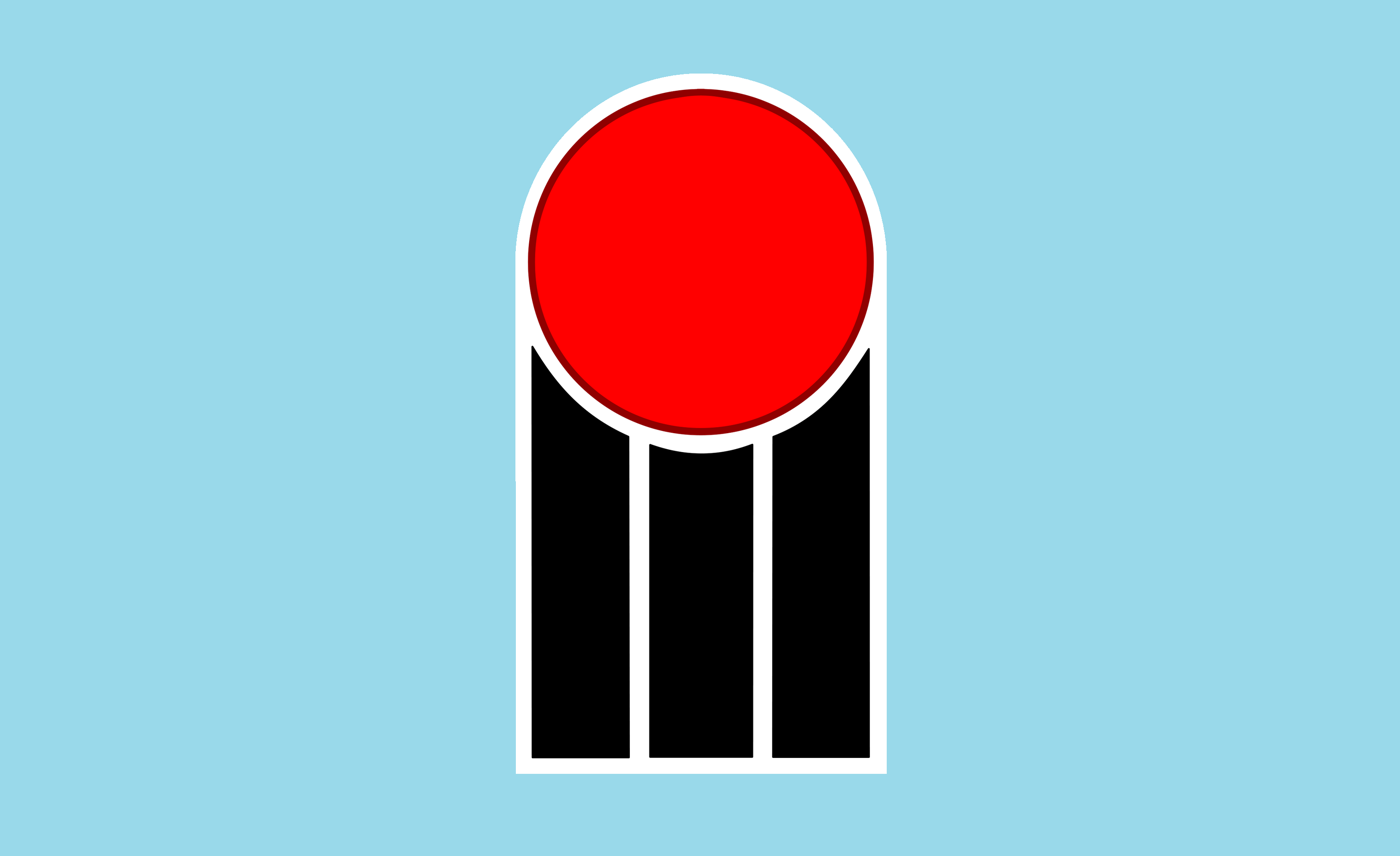
| | Australia | World XI |
- Dates: 4 November 1978 – 19 November 1978
| Captains | Ian Chappell | Tony Greig |

Test series
- Result: Australia won the 1-match series 1–0
| Most runs | Greg Chappell (163) | Dennis Amiss (48) |
| Most wickets | Dennis Lillee (12) | Richard Hadlee (7) |

One Day International series
- Results: World XI won the 9-match series 5–3
| Most runs | Ian Chappell (164) | Dennis Amiss (181) |
| Most wickets | Max Walker (17) | Richard Hadlee (18) |

In 1978, prior to the start of the second season of World Series Cricket (WSC), the Australian and World XI teams embarked on a brief tour of New Zealand, the first time that WSC teams had played outside Australia. A four-day game played in Auckland was to be followed by a three-day single innings game and a total of six one day games between the two sides over a 16-day period. The abandonment of the third one-day game led to the scheduling of an additional game at the same venue later in the tour. The planned three-day game became a pair of one-day games after the first day was washed out, which led to a final total of nine one-day games on the schedule.

== Background ==
New Zealand's chief cricket administrator, Walter Hadlee, had advocated a compromise position from the start of the dispute between Kerry Packer and the Australian Cricket Board. Hadlee personally did not object to WSC making a brief tour of his country in November 1978. The tour was aided by New Zealand's star player Richard Hadlee (Walter's son) being allowed to appear in WSC matches playing for the World XI team. While the New Zealand Cricket Council (NZCC) did not formally support or approve the tour or any matches, it could only request, not order, that New Zealand players, umpires and officials not to become involved. The matches were not approved and were considered by the NZCC as unofficial exhibitions.

Below standard pitches and small crowds were a talking point of the tour. Crowds peaked at about 4,000 in Lower Hutt and were as small as around 300 in Wanganui. Tony Greig said WSC organisers were not overly concerned, at that stage, with the crowd sizes and commented "We have the unusual grounds to play on, grounds which are not accepted as suitable for cricket."

== Tour itinerary ==
| Date | Fixture | Venue |
|---|---|---|
| 4 Nov 1978 | 4-day game | Mount Smart Stadium, Auckland |
| 8 Nov 1978 | 1st ODI | Mount Smart Stadium, Auckland |
| 9 Nov 1978 | 2nd ODI | Tauranga Domain Outer Ground, Tauranga |
| 10 Nov 1978 | 3rd ODI | Pukekura Park, New Plymouth |
| 12 Nov 1978 | 3-day game | Cooks Gardens, Wanganui |
| 16 Nov 1978 | 4th ODI | Te Whiti Park, Lower Hutt |
| 18 Nov 1978 | 5th ODI | Nelson Cricket Ground, Hastings |
| 19 Nov 1978 | 6th ODI | Mount Smart Stadium, Auckland |

== Four Day Game ==
4–6 November 1978 (4 Day Match)
scorecard

| Australia | v | World XI |
| 184 (56.1 overs); Greg Chappell 74; Bernard Julien 3/19 (10.1) | | 128 (36 overs); Dennis Amiss 43; Dennis Lillee 7/59 (18) |
| 196 (58.4 overs); Greg Chappell 89; Richard Hadlee 5/26 (15) | | 87 (27.2 overs); Richard Hadlee 21; Dennis Lillee 5/30 (14) |

Australia won by 167 runs
Mount Smart Stadium, Auckland

- World XI won the toss and chose to field

== Three Day Game ==
12–14 November 1978
Scorecard

| Australia | v | World XI |

No Result
Cooks Gardens, Wanganui

- First day lost to rain; remaining two days rescheduled as ODIs

== ODI Series ==
=== 1st ODI ===
8 November 1978
Scorecard

| Australia; 136 (49.1 overs) | v | World XI; 106 (30.2 overs) |
| Rick McCosker 39; Albert Padmore 4/28 (10) | | Dennis Amiss 63*; Max Walker 5/26 (9.2) |

Australia won by 30 runs
Mount Smart Stadium, Auckland

- 50 over match

=== 2nd ODI ===
9 November 1978
Scorecard

| World XI; 178 (46.3 overs) | v | Australia; 94 (37.3 overs) |
| Lawrence Rowe 52; Dennis Lillee 3/15 (8.3) | | Ian Davis 30; Derek Underwood 3/12 (8.3) |

World XI won by 84 runs
Tauranga Domain Outer Ground, Tauranga

- 50 over match

=== 3rd ODI ===
10 November 1978
Scorecard

| World XI | v | Australia |

Match abandoned without a ball being bowled
Pukekura Park, New Plymouth

- Rescheduled for New Plymouth on 15 November
- 50 over match

=== 4th ODI ===
13 November 1978
Scorecard

| World XI; 149/7 (30 overs) | v | Australia; 124 (28.1 overs) |
| Barry Richards 51; Ray Bright 2/34 (6) | | Rod Marsh 45; Richard Hadlee 3/8 (5.1) |

World XI won by 25 runs
Cooks Gardens, Wanganui

- The rain of the previous day meant a new wicket was required; the delayed start led to the game being reduced to 30 overs each
- 50 over match

=== 5th ODI ===
14 November 1978
Scorecard

| Australia; 178 (49.5 overs) | v | World XI; 75 (31.2 overs) |
| Ian Chappell 66; Collis King 5/47 (9.5) | | Clive Rice 36*; Mick Malone 4/9 (10) |

Australia won by 103 runs
Cooks Gardens, Wanganui

- 50 over match

=== 6th ODI ===
15 November 1978
Scorecard

| World XI; 156 (42.5 overs) | v | Australia; 68 (37.2 overs) |
| Dennis Amiss 71; Doug Walters 4/17 (4.5) | | Ian Davis 20; Mike Proctor 4/6 (9) |

World XI won by 88 runs
Pukekura Park, New Plymouth

- 50 over match

=== 7th ODI ===
16 November 1978
Scorecard

| Australia; 171/8 (40 overs) | v | World XI; 164 (37.2 overs) |
| Ian Chappell 49; Collis King 3/27 (6) | | Lawrence Rowe 36; Max Walker 4/36 (8) |

Australia won by 7 runs
Te Whiti Park, Lower Hutt

- Match reduced to 40 overs per side prior to start
- 50 over match

=== 8th ODI ===
18 November 1978
Scorecard

| World XI; 147/3 (37 overs) | v | Australia; 107 (31 overs) |
| Barry Richards 64; Mick Malone 2/23 (10) | | Rick McCosker 31; Collis King 5/36 (10) |

World XI won by 40 runs
Nelson Cricket Ground, Hastings

- Match reduced to 37 overs per side prior to start
- 50 over match

=== 9th ODI ===
19 November 1978
Scorecard

| Australia; 118 (40.4 overs) | v | World XI; 122/9 (39.3 overs) |
| Doug Walters 29; Rod Marsh 29; Richard Hadlee 4/25 (10) | | Clive Rice 46; Max Walker 3/19 (9.3) |

World XI won by 1 wicket
Mount Smart Stadium, Auckland

- 50 over match
