= Charles Tuke =

Charles Tuke may refer to:

- Charles Tuke (cricketer, born 1857) (1857–1925), English cricketer for Middlesex
- Charles Tuke (cricketer, born 1858) (1858–1929), English cricketer for Hawke's Bay
- Charles Tuke (architect) (1843–1893)
