= John Ironmonger =

John Ironmonger may refer to:

- John Ironmonger (footballer) (born 1961), Australian rules footballer
- John Ironmonger (writer) (born 1954), British writer
