= Bill Hughes (cricketer) =

Personal information
- Full name: William John Hughes
- Born: 14 November 1859; Invercargill, New Zealand
- Died: 4 December 1934 (aged 75); Napier, New Zealand
- Batting: Right-handed
- Bowling: Right-arm medium-pace
- Role: Bowler

Domestic team information
- Years: Team
- 1891-92 to 1905-06: Hawke's Bay

Career statistics
Competition	First-class
Matches	16
Runs scored	108
Batting average	6.00
100s/50s	0/0
Top score	21
Balls bowled	1356
Wickets	34
Bowling average	20.91
5 wickets in innings	2
10 wickets in match	0
Best bowling	6/80
Catches/stumpings	4/–
- Source: Cricinfo, 6 December 2021

William John Hughes (14 November 1859 – 4 December 1934) was a New Zealand cricketer who played first-class cricket for Hawke's Bay from 1892 to 1906.

Hughes was born in Invercargill and lived for some years in Timaru. A medium-paced bowler, he was one of the leading players for South Canterbury in the 1880s before moving to Napier in 1891. He took 5 for 40 and 2 for 29 for Hawke's Bay against Auckland in 1894-95. His best first-class figures were 6 for 80 in the first innings against Wellington in 1898-99; he had taken the only wicket to fall in the second innings when rain washed out the rest of the match.

Hughes worked as a law clerk for a firm of solicitors in Napier. He died in December 1934, survived by his wife and their two daughters. He was still playing club cricket in Napier, and taking wickets, a few days before his death at the age of 75.
