= Matthew O'Brien (disambiguation) =

Matthew O'Brien or Matt O'Brien may refer to:

- Matt O'Brien, Australian rugby union referee
- Matthew O'Brien (cricketer)
- Matthew O'Brien (mathematician) (1814–1855), Irish mathematician
- Matthew O'Brien, writer, editor and teacher
