= Fred Laws =

Fred or Frederick Laws may refer to:

- Fred Laws (cricketer) (1877–1954), English-born New Zealand cricketer
- Fred Laws (rugby league) (1905–1986), Australian rugby league player
- Frederick Charles Victor Laws (1887–1975), officer in the Royal Air Force
