= Hugh Tuke =

New Zealand cricketer and New Zealand Army soldier

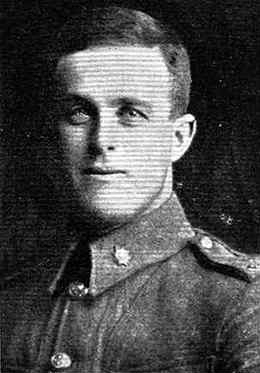

Personal information
- Full name: Hugh Latimer Tuke
- Born: 6 April 1885; Taradale, Hawke's Bay, New Zealand
- Died: 7 June 1915 (aged 30) at sea aboard HMHS Sicilia, off Gallipoli, Ottoman Empire
- Batting: Unknown
- Relatives: Charles Tuke (father)

Domestic team information
- Years: Team
- 1904/05: Hawke's Bay

Career statistics
Competition	First-class
Matches	1
Runs scored	7
Batting average	7.00
100s/50s	–/–
Top score	4*
Catches/stumpings	–/–
- Source: Cricinfo, 31 March 2021

Hugh Latimer Tuke (6 April 1885 – 7 June 1915) was a New Zealand first-class cricketer and New Zealand Army soldier.

The son of The Reverend Charles Tuke and his wife Mary, he was born at Taradale in April 1885. He was educated at Heretaunga School. After completing his education, he was employed by the stock and station agency Williams & Kettle, after which he joined the Roads Department. He was at this time a corporal with the Napier Guards and was considered to be one of the best shots in the company. Tuke was a keen sportsman, playing football for Hawke's Bay. He also played first-class cricket for Hawke's Bay against Auckland at Auckland Domain in 1905. In a heavy defeat for Hawke's Bay, he made scores of 3 and 4 not out, being dismissed by Jocelyn Kallender in the Hawke's Bay first innings. Following this, he was invited by a relative to live with them in the United States and learn farming, remaining there for five years. Upon his return to New Zealand he bought land in the Thames Valley.

Tuke enlisted with the New Zealand Army immediately at the start of the First World War. Serving with the 6th Hauraki Regiment, he travelled with the New Zealand Expeditionary Force to Europe. Highly thought of, he was offered a commission into a regiment of the British Army, but turned down the offer, opting to remain with his own regiment. He saw action during the Gallipoli campaign and was seriously wounded in action while undertaking a reconnaissance of Ottoman trenches at Quinn's Post. He was evacuated to the hospital ship HMHS Sicilia, where he died from his wounds on 7 June 1915.
