= Norman Jacobsen =

Norm or Norman Jacobsen may refer to:

- Norman Jacobsen (cricketer) (1889–1950), New Zealand cricketer and political candidate
- Norman Jacobsen (politician) (1930–2019), Canadian logger and politician

== See also ==
- Norm Jacobson
