= Tilsley =

Tilsley may refer to:

- Colin Tilsley (1935–1981), the founder of Gospel Literature Outreach
- Frank Tilsley (1904–1957), British novelist, broadcaster, and television dramatist from Manchester
- Gwilym Tilsley (1911–1997), bardic name of "Tilsli", Welsh poet, Archdruid of the National Eisteddfod of Wales
- Paul Tilsley, deputy leader of Birmingham City Council
- Reg Tilsley (1926–1987), British composer

== Fictional characters ==
- Bert Tilsley, fictional character in the UK television ITV soap opera Coronation Street
- Ivy Tilsley (also Brennan), fictional character in the UK television ITV soap opera Coronation Street; wife of Bert
- Brian Tilsley, fictional character in the UK television ITV soap opera Coronation Street; son of Bert and Ivy
- Gail Tilsley (also Potter, Platt, Hillman, McIntyre and Rodwell), fictional character in the UK television ITV soap opera Coronation Street; wife of Brian
- Nick Tilsley, fictional character in the UK television ITV soap opera Coronation Street; son of Brian and Gail
- Sarah-Louise Tilsley (later Platt), fictional character in the UK television ITV soap opera Coronation Street; daughter of Brian and Gail
- Jack Tilsley, fictional character in the UK television ITV soap opera Coronation Street; appeared before Bert as Ivy's husband, but later retconned out of existence

== See also ==
- Tillsley
