= John Carr (cricketer, born 1892) =

English cricketer and army officer (1892–1963)

Personal information
- Full name: John Lillingston Carr
- Born: 16 May 1892; Palamcottah, Madras Presidency, British India
- Died: 3 February 1963 (aged 70); Derby, Derbyshire, England
- Batting: Right-handed
- Relatives: Donald Carr (son); John Carr (grandson)

Domestic team information
- Years: Team
- 1913: Marylebone Cricket Club
- 1926–1936: Berkshire

Career statistics
Competition	First-class
Matches	4
Runs scored	114
Batting average	16.28
100s/50s	–/–
Top score	46
Catches/stumpings	3/–
- Source: Cricinfo, 14 February 2019

John Lillingston Carr (16 May 1892 – 3 February 1963) was an English first-class cricketer and British Army officer. Born in British India, Carr served during the First World War with the Royal Berkshire Regiment. He continued to serve with the regiment after the war, until his retirement in 1936. He also played first-class cricket for the Marylebone Cricket Club and the British Army cricket team. He was the father of the Test cricketer Donald Carr.

== Early life and WWI ==
The son of the Reverend Edmund Carr and his wife, Edith Louisa Margaret Lillingston, Carr was born at Palamcottah in British India. Carr came to England by 1901, where he was educated at St. Lawrence College, Ramsgate. From St. Lawrence he went up to Magdalen College, Oxford in 1904, where among his contemporaries was Edward, Prince of Wales. He played football for Oxford University A.F.C. He debuted in first-class cricket in 1913 for the Marylebone Cricket Club against Oxford University at Oxford, making scores of 7 and 10, with Carr being dismissed in the match by Philip Davies and Basil Melle respectively.

Carr served in the British Army during World War I, enlisting as a second lieutenant with the Royal Berkshire Regiment in November 1914. In December 1914, he was promoted to the rank of lieutenant in December 1914. He was mentioned in a letter written by the Prince of Wales in April 1915, following an encounter with Carr at the front. Ill health during saw Carr placed on the half-pay list in July 1915, with Carr returning to duty in July 1916, with fellow cricketer Guy Gregson-Ellis acting as his deputy. Having been promoted to the rank of captain by 1917, Carr gained the rank of temporary major in June 1918.

== Post-WWI and later life ==
Following the war, Carr served in Germany as part of the British Army of the Rhine. He relinquished the temporary rank of major in March 1920, reverting to the rank of captain when he left his service battalion, which had presumably been disbanded. In July 1922, he was promoted to the temporary rank of brigade major, a post he relinquished in December of the same year. In September 1923, he was seconded to the Territorial Army as an adjutant.

Thirteen years after his initial first-class appearance, Carr played three first-class matches for the British Army cricket team in 1926. He scored 97 runs across these three matches at an average of 19.40, with a high score of 46. He made his debut in minor counties cricket in that same year for Berkshire in the Minor Counties Championship. After a gap of four years, he played frequently for Berkshire in 1930 and 1931, before making a final lone appearance in 1936.

Carr returned to the Royal Berkshire Regiment from his secondment in April 1927, where he served in British India until at least 1931. He was promoted to the rank of major on a permanent basis in November 1929. He retired from active service in April 1936, with seniority antedated to September 1927. Carr exceeded the age limit for recall in June 1948, at which point he was removed from the reserve officers list and was granted the honorary rank of lieutenant colonel.

After retiring from the army, Carr took up a position as the bursar of Repton School in Derbyshire, with Carr moving with his family from the New Forest in Hampshire. He later died at the Derbyshire Royal Infirmary in Derby in February 1963, following a short illness.

== Personal life ==
He married Constance Ruth Smith in 1919, with the couple having three sons. His youngest son, Donald, played Test cricket for England, while his grandson, John, was also a first-class cricketer.
