= Hawke (surname) =

Hawke is a surname. Notable people with the surname include:

- Alex Hawke (b. 1977), Australian politician
- Bert Hawke (1900–1986), Premier of Western Australia
- Bob Hawke (1929–2019), Prime Minister of Australia
- Brett Hawke (b. 1975), Australian Olympic swimmer
- Clem Hawke (1898–1989), Congregationalist minister and father of Bob Hawke
- Davis Wolfgang Hawke (1978–2017), U.S. spammer
- Edward Hawke, 1st Baron Hawke (1705–1781), British naval officer
- Ethan Hawke (b. 1970), American actor
- George Hawke (1871–1950), New Zealand cricketer
- Hazel Hawke (1929–2013), wife of Bob Hawke
- Joe Hawke (1940–2022), New Zealand politician
- John D. Hawke, Jr. (1933–2022), U.S. comptroller of the currency
- Johnny Hawke (1925–1992), Australian rugby league footballer
- Levon Hawke (b. 2002), American actor
- Martin Hawke, 7th Baron Hawke (1860–1938), known as Lord Hawke, English cricketer
- Maya Hawke (b. 1998), American actress and model
- Neil Hawke (1939–2000), Australian cricketer and footballer
- Paul Hawke (b. 1964), Australian rules footballer
- Simon Hawke (b. 1951), science fiction author
- Warren Hawke (b. 1970), English professional footballer

== Fictional characters ==
- Connor Hawke, son of Green Arrow from DC Comics
- Ian Hawke the main antagonist in the live action-CGI films starring Alvin and the Chipmunks
- Meyrin Hawke and Lunamaria Hawke, fictional characters from anime series Mobile Suit Gundam Seed Destiny
- Saint John Hawke, fictional character in season 4 of the American television series Airwolf
- Stringfellow Hawke, fictional character from seasons 1-3 of Airwolf
- Elizabeth Hawke, protagonist/antagonist in the Australian series Wicked Science
- Hawke, the surname of the player character of Dragon Age II
