= John A'Deane =

New Zealand cricketer

John Robert Bayly A'Deane (21 March 1865 – 14 March 1924) was a New Zealand first-class cricketer who played for Hawke's Bay in the 1890s.

A'Deane's father, also called John A'Deane, founded the homestead "Ashcott", near Takapau, Hawke's Bay, and served on the Hawke's Bay Provincial Council, including several years as speaker. John A'Deane junior was born at Ashcott, and educated in England at Haileybury College and Pembroke College, Cambridge, where he graduated with a BA in 1886. He married Margaret Maud Robertson in Christchurch in September 1899. He died suddenly at home at Ashcott in March 1924 while talking on the telephone. Aged 58, he was survived by his wife and their two daughters.

A'Deane played in three first-class matches, scoring 33 runs with a highest score of 17, and held two catches. He took three wickets with a best innings return of two for 31.
