= Napier Recreation Ground =

Cricket ground in Napier, Hawke's Bay, New Zealand

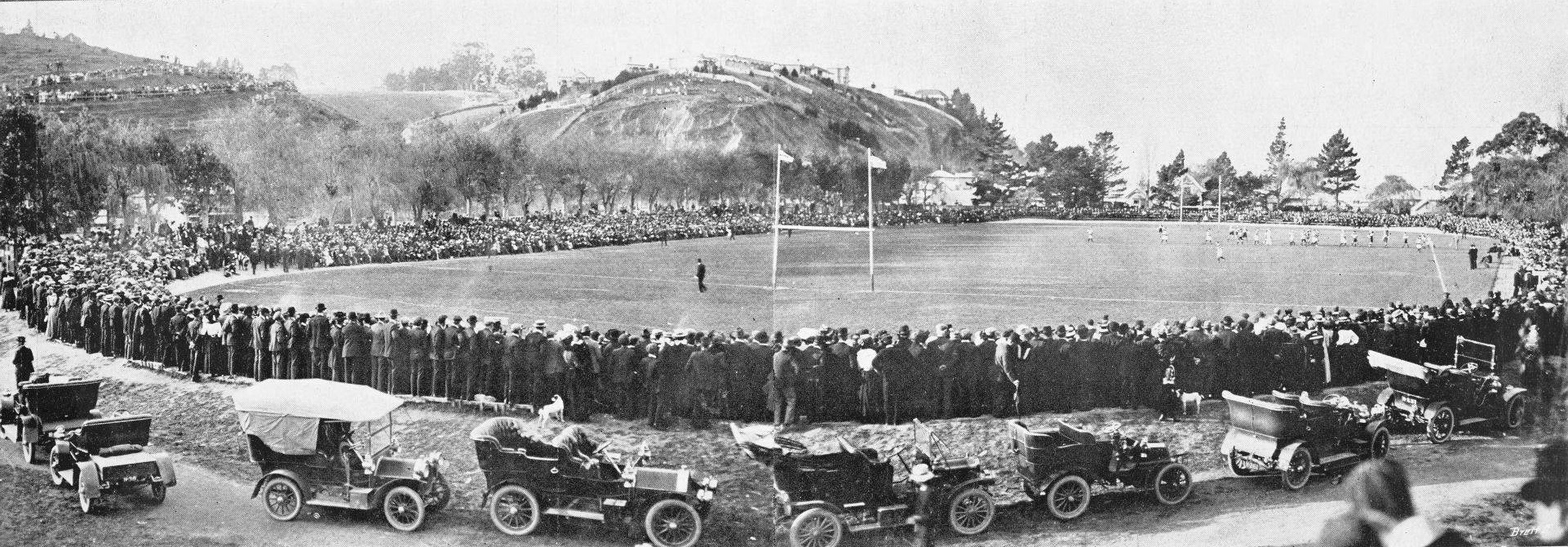
- The ground hosting a rugby game between Hawke's Bay and the British Lions in 1908

Ground information
- Location: Napier, New Zealand
- Country: New Zealand
- Establishment: 1884 (first recorded match)

Team information
Hawke's Bay	(1884–1913)
- As of 2 November 2011; Source: Ground profile

Napier Recreation Ground was a cricket ground in Napier, Hawke's Bay, New Zealand. It was located on Carlyle Street, opposite Chaucer Street.

== History ==
The ground first held a first-class match when Hawke's Bay played Wellington in 1884. Hawke's Bay would play nineteen further first-class matches there, the last of which came in 1913 against Auckland. During this period the ground played host to the touring Fijians, Marylebone Cricket Club and Australians.

In 1908 it hosted a rugby match on the British Lions tour, with the Lions defeating Hawke's Bay 25 to 3.

By 1919 the Napier City Council had reappropriated the ground's land for a new power house.
