= Tommy Creed =

New Zealand cricketer (1879–1950)

Personal information
- Full name: Thomas Michael Creed
- Born: 30 November 1878; Parramatta, Sydney, Australia
- Died: 9 May 1950 (aged 70–71); Napier, Hawke's Bay, New Zealand
- Batting: Right-handed
- Bowling: Right-arm offbreak
- Role: All-rounder

Domestic team information
- Years: Team
- 1910/11–1913/14: Hawke's Bay

Career statistics
Competition	First-class
Matches	5
Runs scored	224
Batting average	22.40
100s/50s	0/1
Top score	82
Balls bowled	337
Wickets	11
Bowling average	18.54
5 wickets in innings	0
10 wickets in match	0
Best bowling	3/37
Catches/stumpings	0/–
- Source: Cricinfo, 3 February 2024

Thomas Michael Creed (30 November 1879 – 9 May 1950) was an Australian-born first-class cricketer.

Creed made his first-class debut for the Hawke's Bay cricket team on 3 March 1911 against Auckland at Victoria Park, Auckland. He took three wickets on debut.
