= Herbert Linnell =

English cricketer

Personal information
- Full name: Herbert James Linnell
- Born: 7 March 1909; Paddington, London, England
- Died: 8 February 1968 (aged 58); Canterbury, Kent, England
- Batting: Right-handed
- Bowling: Right-arm fast

Domestic team information
- Years: Team
- 1929–1932: Oxford University

Career statistics
Competition	First-class
Matches	4
Runs scored	34
Batting average	5.66
100s/50s	–/–
Top score	11
Balls bowled	648
Wickets	8
Bowling average	38.75
5 wickets in innings	–
10 wickets in match	–
Best bowling	4/57
Catches/stumpings	3/–
- Source: Cricinfo, 29 March 2020

Herbert James Linnell (7 March 1909 – 8 February 1968) was an English first-class cricketer and educator.

Linnell was born at Paddington in March 1909. He was educated at St. Lawrence College, Ramsgate before going up to Trinity College, Oxford. While studying at Oxford, he played first-class cricket for Oxford University, making his debut against Middlesex at Oxford in 1929. He next played for Oxford in 1932, making three appearances, including against the touring Indians. Playing as a right-arm fast bowler, he took 8 wickets at an average of 38.75 and best figures of 4 for 57.

After graduating from Oxford, he became a schoolteacher. He taught at Repton School during the 1930s. He served as a lieutenant with the Sherwood Foresters during the Second World War. Linnell died in hospital at Canterbury in February 1968.
