= British Property Federation =

British not-for-profit organisation

- Formation: 1963
- Type: Trade association
- Legal status: Private company
- Purpose: Promoting the real estate sector of the United Kingdom
- Location: 88 Kingsway, London, WC2B 6AA
- Region served: United Kingdom
- Chief Executive: Melanie Leech CBE
- Main organ: Board
- Website: bpf.org.uk

British Property Federation (BPF) is a British not-for-profit membership organisation representing companies involved in property ownership and investment.

The BPF "work[s] with Government and regulatory bodies to help the real estate industry grow and thrive, to the benefit of [its] members and the economy as a whole". It comments regularly on proposed Government policies that will impact its members, including topics such as infrastructure, build-to-rent development, and REIT legislation.

Its membership comprises a wide range of companies, including real estate companies, institutional investors, fund managers, investment banks, housing associations, and professional firms. The BPF operates in Scotland as the Scottish Property Federation from offices in Edinburgh.

BPF Chief Executive Melanie Leech was appointed in October 2014. David Partridge, Senior Partner, Argent LLP & Chairman, Argent Related is President, and Guy Grainger, Global Head of Sustainability Services & ESG, JLL, is Vice President. Other board members are from prominent property and investment companies.

== Objectives ==
The BPF has three objectives according to its website:

- to improve the legislative, fiscal and regulatory conditions that affect [the real estate] industry
- to help [BPF] members access information, understand policy, and promote best practice
- to raise the profile of the real estate industry.

== Governance ==
The BPF is governed by a Board, composed of four officers – President, Vice President, Junior Vice President and Immediate Past President – as well as the Chief Executive, an Honorary Treasurer, and six other industry professionals.

== Members ==
The BPF currently has around 400 member companies, roughly made up of a third real estate companies, a third professional firms, and a third other organisations such as investment banks and fund managers.

The BPF's policy work is overseen by a range of committees, each made up of a chairman and between 15 and 30 people from its member companies. It currently has 21 committees involving over 400 direct members in total, as well as 13 working groups and six regional forums.

== Presidents ==
- 1974 – 76 Victor Lucas
- 1976 – 77 Sir Richard Thompson
- 1977 – 79 David Llewellyn
- 1979 – 81 Nigel Mobbs
- 1981 – 83 Christopher Benson
- 1983 – 84 Dennis Marler
- 1984 – 86 Harry Axton
- 1986 – 87 John Brown
- 1987 – 88 Geoffrey Carter
- 1988 – 89 Brian Cann
- 1989 – 90 Michael Mallinson
- 1990 – 91 Peter Hunt
- 1991 – 92 Trevor Osborne
- 1992 – 93 John Parry
- 1993 – 94 James Tuckey
- 1994 – 95 Roger Carey
- 1995 – 96 Trevor Moross
- 1996 – 97 Lorraine Baldry
- 1997 – 98 Stuart Corbyn
- 1998 – 99 Gordon Edington
- 1999 – 00 Ronald Spinner
- 2000 – 01 Christopher Bertram
- 2001 – 02 Jeremy Newsum
- 2002 – 03 Ian Henderson
- 2003 – 04 David Hunter
- 2004 – 05 Martin Moore
- 2005 – 06 Ian Coull
- 2006 – 07 Nicholas Ritblat
- 2007 – 08 Ian Marcus
- 2008 – 09 Francis Salway
- 2009 – 10 Rupert Clarke
- 2010 – 11 John Richards
- 2011 – 12 Toby Courtauld
- 2012 – 13 Chris Grigg
- 2013 – 14 David Marks
- 2014 – 15 Bill Hughes
- 2015 – 16 Chris Taylor
- 2016 – 17 David Sleath
- 2017 – 18 Paul Brundage
- 2018 – 19 Robert Noel
- 2019 – 20 Helen Gordon
- 2020 – David Partridge

== Directors-General and Chief Executives ==
- 1974 – 80 Sir Eugene Melville
- 1980 – 85 Sir Donald Tebbit
- 1986 – 93 Sir Peregrine Rhodes
- 1993 – 02 William McKee
- 2002 – 14 Liz Peace
- 2015 – present Melanie Leech

== Guides ==
What is the British Property Federation? – An industry guide to the BPF's role in the UK market
