= Robert Chadwick (sportsman) =

New Zealand cricketer

Personal information
- Full name: Robert John Mantague Chadwick
- Born: 16 October 1879; Dunedin, Otago, New Zealand
- Died: 11 March 1939 (aged 59); Napier, Hawke's Bay, New Zealand

Domestic team information
- Years: Team
- 1904/05: Otago
- 1913/14: Hawke's Bay
- Source: ESPNcricinfo, 6 May 2016

Robert John Montague Chadwick (16 October 1879 – 11 March 1939), sometimes known as Monty Chadwick, was a New Zealand sportsman. He played first-class cricket for Otago and Hawke's Bay.

Chadwick was born at Dunedin in 1879. He worked as an engineer with AT Burt and Company in Dunedin before becoming a draughtsman with the company. He was later the secretary of the Automobile Association in the Hawke's Bay region and chairman of Napier's Chamber of Commerce. He was described in obituaries as "one of Napier's most active citizens" and as being "well-known all over New Zealand for his personality and sportsmanship". He played association football for Otago and for the New Zealand national football team, touring Australia with the team in 1905.
