= Gordon Edington =

British businessman (born 1945)

George Gordon Edington
- Born: 1945 (age 80–81)
- Occupation: Businessman

George Gordon Edington (born 7 September 1945), known as Gordon Edington, is a London-born businessman, and writer. He was Vice President and President of the British Property Federation, Group Property Director of BAA Airports and Non Executive Director of Lendlease. He was awarded the CBE in 2006 for services to children as chair of the NCH.

Edington is the son of George Adam Edington and Phyllis Mary (née Allan). When he was 13 months old the family went to live in Kenya, where his father was an engineer working on the Sasumua Dam. In Kenya he went to a nursery school in the Aberdare Mountains and then to St. Mary's boarding school in Nairobi. When the family returned to England, Edington attended St Lawrence College, Ramsgate in Kent, from 1957 to 1964 Soon after leaving college Edington started as an office boy at Knight Frank, where he worked for four years. After a number of years of evening courses he qualified as a Chartered Surveyor, becoming a Fellow of the Royal Institution of Chartered Surveyors in 1970.

In 1981 Edington joined the board of Lynton Holdings, previously he had been a director at Sterling Land. He was a director at BAA from 1991 to 1999. He then joined the board of Lendlease as non executive director where he remained for 13 years.

Edington was president of the British Property Federation from 1998 to 1999. In 2001 he was appointed chair of NCH.

== Books and publications ==
- Property Management: A Customer Focused Approach (1997) ISBN 9780333674703
- The Clowes Family of Chester Sporting Artists (Grosvenor Museum Chester, 1985) ISBN 9780903235112
