= Jack O'Brien (cricketer) =

New Zealand cricketer

Personal information
- Full name: John Joseph O'Brien
- Born: 1886
- Died: 20 December 1939 (aged 52–53); Napier, New Zealand
- Batting: Right-handed
- Bowling: Right-arm medium-fast
- Relatives: Matt O'Brien (son)

Domestic team information
- Years: Team
- 1905-06 to 1920-21: Hawke's Bay

Career statistics
Competition	First-class
Matches	14
Runs scored	314
Batting average	13.65
100s/50s	0/0
Top score	39
Balls bowled
Wickets	27
Bowling average	27.22
5 wickets in innings	1
10 wickets in match	0
Best bowling	5/55
Catches/stumpings	8/0
- Source: Cricinfo, 17 December 2018

John Joseph O'Brien (1886 – 20 December 1939) was a New Zealand cricketer who played first-class cricket for Hawke's Bay from 1906 to 1921.

Jack O'Brien was a useful batsman and medium-fast bowler. His best performances came in the match against Wellington in 1919-20, when he took 4 for 56 and 5 for 55 opening the bowling and made 39 and 11 opening the batting, playing a leading part in Hawke's Bay's 52-run victory. It was Hawke's Bay's last first-class victory.

O'Brien later became an umpire. He umpired Hawke's Bay's match against the touring MCC team in 1935-36, and was president of the Hawke's Bay Cricket Umpires Association and vice-president of the Hawke's Bay Cricket Association.

For 25 years he worked for the carrying company Messrs Barry Bros Ltd of Napier. He died aged 53 after a long illness. His son Matt played first-class cricket for Wellington.
