= Michael Curtis (journalist) =

British newspaper editor and executive (1920–2004)

- Born: 28 February 1920; Cambridge, England
- Died: 3 July 2004 (aged 84)
- Education: St Lawrence College, Ramsgate; Sidney Sussex College, Cambridge
- Occupations: Newspaper editor and executive

Michael Curtis (28 February 1920 – 3 July 2004) was a British newspaper editor and executive.

== Biography ==
Curtis was born in Cambridge, England, and studied at St Lawrence College, Ramsgate, and Sidney Sussex College, Cambridge. During World War II, he fought with the Duke of Wellington's Regiment. He was injured in 1943, and after recovery, returned to Cambridge University to complete his degree.

In 1944, Curtis joined the Eastern Daily Press as a reporter, then in 1946 he joined the News Chronicle. He was promoted to become Deputy Editor in 1953, and in 1954, he became Editor. Politically, he kept the newspaper aligned with the Liberal Party, and opposed the Suez invasion, a decision that led to a significant decrease in the paper's circulation.

As editor, Curtis proposed a succession of ideas intended to revive the paper's circulation: to start using a broadsheet format, to form a partnership with Granada Television, to merge with the Daily Herald, and finally to increase the price by a halfpenny in order to boost profits. Each idea was rejected by owner Laurence Cadbury. In 1957, Curtis finally resigned.

Curtis later worked as executive aide to the Aga Khan, writing speeches and organising publicity. In 1959, he launched the Nation Media Group on behalf of the Aga Khan, which published the Sunday Nation and subsequently the Daily Nation in Kenya, competing successfully with the existing colonial newspapers, the Tanganyika Standard and the East African Standard. Sales rose rapidly from 17,500 to 35,000, and ultimately to 165,000. The company became profitable in ten years. As the culmination of the process of Africanising the company, Curtis stepped down in 1977, and moved to lead the Aga Khan's social welfare department at the Aiglemont estate until his retirement in 1994.

Media offices
Preceded by Robin Cruikshank	Editor of the News Chronicle; 1954–1957	Succeeded by Norman Cursley
