= Ted Fillary =

English cricketer

Personal information
- Full name: Edward William Joseph Fillary
- Born: 14 April 1944 (age 82); Heathfield, Sussex, England
- Batting: Right-handed
- Bowling: Leg break

Domestic team information
- Years: Team
- 1963–1965: Oxford University
- 1963–1966: Kent
- FC debut: 1 May 1963 Oxford University v Gloucestershire
- Last FC: 25 June 1966 Kent v Oxford University

Career statistics
Competition	First-class
Matches	45
Runs scored	1,371
Batting average	19.04
100s/50s	0/3
Top score	75
Balls bowled	3,897
Wickets	82
Bowling average	26.37
5 wickets in innings	5
10 wickets in match	0
Best bowling	6/77
Catches/stumpings	24/–
- Source: CricInfo, 23 June 2017

Edward William Joseph Fillary (born 14 April 1944), known as Ted Fillary, is a former English cricketer who played first-class cricket for Oxford University and Kent County Cricket Club between 1963 and 1966.

Fillary was born at Heathfield in Sussex, in 1944. He attended St Lawrence College, Ramsgate, scoring 794 runs in 1961. The following year he captained the team and scored 869 runs at an average of 96.55 and taking 55 wickets with his leg-spin at 9.76, setting a record for runs scored for the school which was only surpassed in 2019. He played for the Public Schools against the Combined Services at Lord's in 1961 and 1962 before going up to Oriel College, Oxford.

Fillary made his first appearances for Kent's Second XI in 1961 in the Second XI Championship. He made his first-class cricket debut for Oxford University in May 1963 against Gloucestershire before winning a cricket Blue in the same season and making his debut for Kent's First XI in July. He took his best figures of 6 for 77 in the university match in 1963, when Wisden noted that he both spun the ball sharply and varied his spin cleverly. He played in the university match in all three of his years at Oxford and made a total of 32 first-class appearances for the team. He was also awarded a hockey Blue.

He appeared in 13 first-class matches for Kent between 1963 and 1966, his final appearance coming against Oxford University at Canterbury in June 1966. His best figures for Kent were 5 for 52 against Middlesex at Lord's in 1964. He played 48 matches for the county's Second XI, making his final appearances in 1967.
