= Matt O'Brien (cricketer) =

New Zealand cricketer (1910–1974)

Personal information
- Full name: Matthew Alexander O'Brien
- Born: 26 July 1910; Napier, New Zealand
- Died: 12 November 1974 (aged 64); Lower Hutt, New Zealand
- Batting: Right-handed
- Role: Batsman
- Relatives: Jack O'Brien (father)

Domestic team information
- Years: Team
- 1932/33–1941/42: Wellington

Career statistics
| Competition | First-class |
|---|---|
| Matches | 15 |
| Runs scored | 685 |
| Batting average | 26.34 |
| 100s/50s | 0/4 |
| Top score | 76* |
| Balls bowled | 78 |
| Wickets | 0 |
| Bowling average | – |
| 5 wickets in innings | 0 |
| 10 wickets in match | 0 |
| Best bowling | – |
| Catches/stumpings | 11/– |
- Source: Cricinfo, 1 May 2025

Matthew Alexander O'Brien (26 July 1910 – 12 November 1974) was a New Zealand cricketer. He played in 15 first-class matches, mostly for Wellington, between the 1932–33 and 1943–44 seasons.

His father Jack played first-class cricket for Hawke's Bay.
