= Michael Godby =

New Zealand cricketer

Personal information
- Full name: Michael John Godby
- Born: 29 September 1850; Henley-on-Thames, England
- Died: 14 December 1923 (aged 73); Marylebone, London, England
- Role: Opening batsman
- Relatives: Harry Godby (brother)

Domestic team information
- Years: Team
- 1875/76: Otago
- 1877/78–1880/81: Canterbury

Career statistics
Competition	First-class
Matches	4
Runs scored	123
Batting average	20.50
100s/50s	0/0
Top score	26*
Balls bowled	256
Wickets	3
Bowling average	39.00
5 wickets in innings	0
10 wickets in match	0
Best bowling	2/64
Catches/stumpings	1/–
- Source: Cricinfo, 6 September 2020

Michael John Godby (29 September 1850 – 14 December 1923) was a New Zealand cricketer. He played first-class cricket for Otago and Canterbury between 1875 and 1881.

Godby was born in England and educated at Winchester College. He went to New Zealand in the 1870s, living first in Dunedin before moving to Timaru where he practised law until 1887. A batsman with a strong defence and an occasional bowler, he played some useful innings in an era of very low scoring, including 23 (top score of the innings) and 14 in the 1877–78 season when Canterbury played in the North Island for the first time and beat Auckland. He captained the South Canterbury team that played the touring Australians at Timaru in January 1881.

Godby married Ada Rhodes in Timaru in August 1881. They had two sons and three daughters. They returned to England early in the 1900s. He died in London in December 1923 after a long illness. Ada died in London in May 1942.
