= St Lawrence College, Ramsgate =

Public school in Ramsgate, Kent, England

St Lawrence College
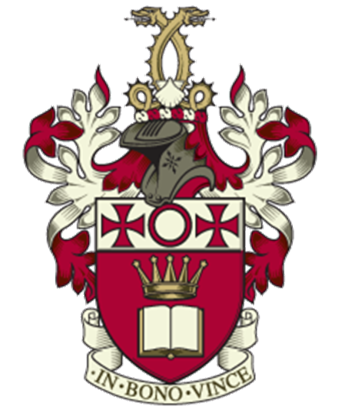

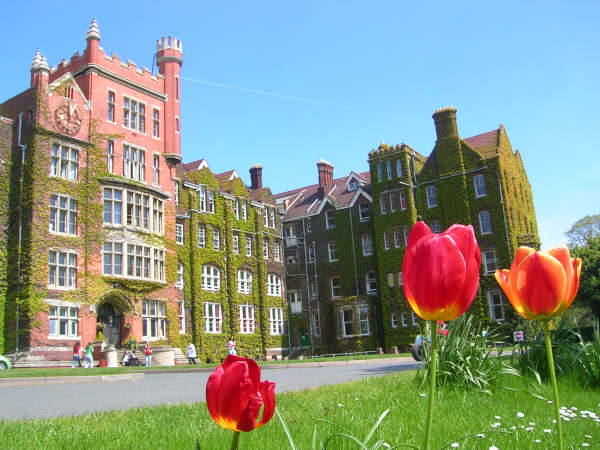
- The main building of the school

Location
- College Road; Ramsgate, Kent, CT11 7AE; England
- 51.343°N 1.415°E

Information
- Former name: South Eastern College
- Type: Public day and boarding school
- Motto: In Bono Vince (Latin for Overcome Evil with Good)
- Religious affiliation: Church of England
- Established: 1879
- Founder: Rev. Emile Cornet d'Auquier
- Department for Education URN: 118947 Tables
- Chairman of the Governors: Graham Carter
- Head of the College: Matthew Brown
- Gender: Coeducational
- Age: 3 to 18
- Enrolment: ≈620 (Senior school 420, Junior school 200)
- Colours: Maroon and white
- Publication: The Lawrentian
- Houses: 7
- Former Pupils: Old Lawrentians
- School Song: Carmen Laurentium
- Website: https://www.slcuk.com

St Lawrence College is a co-educational public school situated in Ramsgate, Kent. It went into administration on 8 April 2026 and announced its closure, although Year 11 and 13 pupils due to sit GCSE, BTEC and A-Level exams will be able to complete their courses at the school.

== Closure ==
The college announced its closure on 8 April 2026 due to financial difficulties, losing 170 jobs, but retaining temporarily 44 members of staff to continue teaching Year 11 and Year 13 students scheduled to sit exams in May and June.

In February 2026, plans were announced to close the school and merge with Dover College, to form St Lawrence Dover College, which would open in September 2026. Following protests from students, alumni and parents, the plans were abandoned two weeks later on 5 March 2026.

== History ==
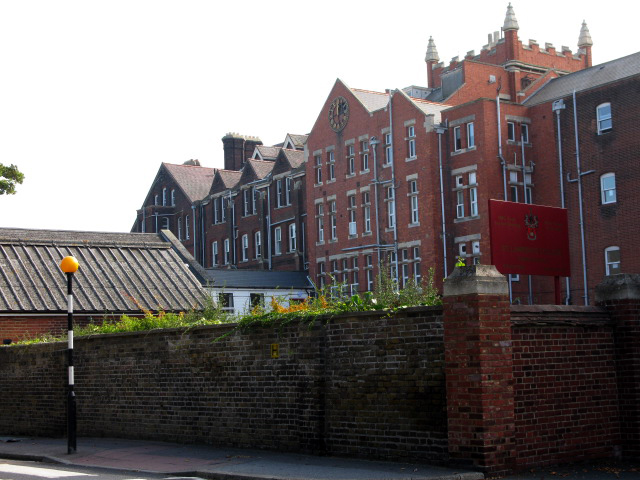
Main building, photographed from College Road

The college was founded in 1879 as South Eastern College (colours: gold and black). The name was changed in September 1906 because of its location in the St Lawrence area of Ramsgate. New colours were also given: maroon and white. The school rapidly outgrew the single house, leading to the main building of the present day college by 1884. The chapel was completed in 1927. During the world wars, the school was evacuated to Chester (1915) and Courteenhall in Northamptonshire (1940), the latter the seat of Sir Hereward Wake, because of its position on the South-East coast. Later in the school's existence, girls were admitted, and the current mix of sexes is now roughly equal.

There were initially four houses: Light Red, Dark Red, Light Blue and Dark Blue; these later became Grange, Tower, Manor and Lodge. During World War II a fifth house was added called Courtenay when a nearby school having failed to maintain numbers was incorporated into the school. Newlands was later added for day scholars and Deacon followed as the Junior end of this house.

In 1930, Richard Maunsell designed for the Southern Railway a fleet of 40 "Schools Class" locomotives one of which was named St Lawrence. These locos were compact but particularly powerful, weighing over 100 tons with tender. As late as 1958 the St Lawrence Loco (BR 30934) was attached to the School Train departing from Ramsgate. Parts of the tender still exist on the Bluebell Railway.

== Senior and middle school ==
The Senior School is divided into five separate houses. The oldest, Tower and Lodge, the two boys' boarding houses, were created in 1889. Newlands and Deacon are the boys' day house, while Clifford and Laing is the girls' day house. Boarding girls are part of Bellerby. All houses are located in the main school building except Bellerby, who have their own building which is situated in the site of the previous Taylor Hall. Cameron and Courtenay are mixed boarding and day sub-houses, respectively, for the Middle School (Kirby). They accommodate students from age 11 to 13. They are housed in the modern Kirby House Building, which was opened in January 2007 by the Archbishop of Canterbury, Rowan Williams. In January 2013, Mark Aitken retired his post of Headmaster and was succeeded by Antony Spencer.

== Junior school ==
St Lawrence College Junior School is located on the same site as the Middle and Senior schools and accommodates pupils from age 3 to 11. The Junior School pupils study in the Hamblen Block which includes classrooms for Years 3-6.

== Performance ==
In 2009, the Daily Telegraph placed the school 330 in its League Table of Independent School A-level results, with 48.81% of pupils gaining A or B grades at A-level. In 2012, the school gained a pass rate of 92.9% with 18% of them being at grades of A and A* at A-level. The GCSE results had a pass rate of 86.5% and 15.5% being at grades of A*.

In 2017, the school had 30% A*/A grades at A-level, and 33% A*/A at GCSE, despite the introduction of the new exams.

== Notable former pupils ==
Old Lawrentians (OLs) of note include:

- Alfred Bellerby, Olympic long jumper
- Hubert Broad, World War I aviator and test pilot
- John Carlisle, Director of the Tobacco Manufacturers' Association
- John Carr, first-class cricketer and British Army officer
- Sir Conrad Corfield, chief advisor in India
- Durward Cruickshank, crystallographer
- Michael Curtis, newspaper editor
- General Richard Dannatt, Baron Dannatt, former Chief of the General Staff, defence advisor to the Conservative party
- Gordon Edington, chair NCH
- David Hart Dyke, Captain of HMS Coventry during the Falklands War
- Ted Fillary, cricketer
- Humphrey Hawksley, BBC World Affairs Correspondent (BBC News)
- John Ironmonger, novelist
- Sir Maurice Laing, construction industry entrepreneur, first president of the CBI
- Herbert Linnell, cricketer
- Eric Mansfield, Aeronautical Engineer, won the Royal Medal in 1994
- Sir George Middleton, diplomat.
- Claude Myburgh, cricketer and soldier
- Denis Oswald, Bletchley Park, first-class cricketer, linguist, housemaster Meadhurst, Uppingham.
- Frank Crowther Roberts VC
- John Ruddock, actor
- Clifford Sharp, journalist and editor
- Herbert Sharp, cricketer and soldier
- Alexander Siddig, actor
- John Smyth, barrister and child abuser
- Michael Steed, political scientist
- John Stevens, Baron Stevens of Kirkwhelpington, former commissioner of the Metropolitan Police
- Robert Summerhayes, cricketer
- John Taylor, Bishop of Winchester
- Colin Tilsley, missionary
