= Norman Jacobsen (cricketer) =

New Zealand cricketer, scientist and teacher

Personal information
- Full name: Norman Reginald Jacobsen
- Born: 3 January 1889; Wellington, New Zealand
- Died: 6 May 1950 (aged 61); Wellington, New Zealand
- Bowling: Medium pace
- Role: Batsman

Domestic team information
- Years: Team
- 1919–21: Hawke's Bay

Career statistics
Competition	First-class
Matches	5
Runs scored	172
Batting average	17.20
100s/50s	0/2
Top score	62
Balls bowled	96
Wickets	2
Bowling average	68.00
5 wickets in innings	0
10 wickets in match	0
Best bowling	1/42
Catches/stumpings	2/–
- Source: Cricket Archive, 18 November 2022

Norman Reginald Jacobsen (3 January 1889 – 6 May 1950) was a New Zealand cricketer, hockey player, scientist, lawyer, teacher, political candidate and businessman.

== Biography ==
Jacobsen was born in 1889 in Wellington. He was educated at Auckland Grammar School. He then studied at the University of Auckland where he graduated with a B.Sc. in 1911 and an M.Sc. in 1912. He did scientific research after he was offered a postgraduate research scholarship. He then studied law at the University of Auckland and later worked in a legal firm. Later he became a teacher and was a second assistant at Hamilton High School and vice-principal at Napier Boys' High School.

Jacobsen played five matches of first-class cricket for Hawke's Bay between 1919 and 1921. An opening batsman, he made 62, the highest score of his career, and Hawke's Bay's highest score of the match, against Wellington in January 1921. Subsequently, he was a member of the executive committees of the Hawke's Bay Cricket Association. He also represented Australia and New Zealand at hockey.

From 1931 to 1933 Jacobsen travelled the world, studying educational methods. He spent some time in the United States, mostly at Columbia University, and in India he spent some months teaching with the writer Rabindranath Tagore. In 1935 he travelled through New Zealand accompanying the touring Indian hockey team.

At the 1935 election, Jacobsen was a candidate of the anti-socialist Democrat Party in the Napier electorate. He polled a distant third.

Jacobsen was appointed manager of the Wellington Sports Centre when it was opened in the mid-1940s. He still held the position when he died in May 1950 at his home in Wellington.

== See also ==
- List of Hawke's Bay representative cricketers
