= 1994 English cricket season =

The 1994 English cricket season was the 95th in which the County Championship had been an official competition. A very strong Warwickshire team won both the Britannic Assurance County Championship and the Sunday League. England defeated New Zealand 1-0 and drew with South Africa 1–1 in the two Test series.

== Honours ==
- County Championship - Warwickshire
- NatWest Trophy - Worcestershire
- Sunday League - Warwickshire
- Benson & Hedges Cup - Warwickshire
- Minor Counties Championship - Devon
- MCCA Knockout Trophy - Devon
- Second XI Championship - Somerset II
- Wisden Cricketers of the Year - Brian Lara, Devon Malcolm, Tim Munton, Steve Rhodes, Kepler Wessels

== Test series ==
England played New Zealand in a 3-test series, winning the first, and drawing the remaining two. South Africa toured England, playing three test matches winning one, drawing one and losing one.

== Leading batsmen ==
J D Carr topped the batting averages, scoring 1,543 runs @ 90.76, and with a top score of 261*.

Brian Lara posted the highest individual innings score in first class cricket (501*) playing for Warwickshire against Durham at Edgbaston, and also scored the largest number of runs throughout the season (2,066 @ 89.82). He also hit an unprecedented 7 centuries in a period of 8 innings (although the first of these was not achieved in the county championship, but playing for the West Indies in a test match against England in Antigua. He scored 375, which was then the highest individual innings in test matches.)

== External sources ==
- CricketArchive – season and tournament itineraries

== Annual reviews ==
- Playfair Cricket Annual 1995
- Wisden Cricketers' Almanack 1995
