= Robert Summerhayes =

English cricketer (1903–1983)

Personal information
- Full name: Robert Currie Summerhayes
- Born: 13 March 1903; Quetta, Baluchistan, British India
- Died: 7 June 1983 (aged 80); Mayfield, Sussex, England
- Batting: Right-handed
- Role: Opening batsman

Domestic team information
- Years: Team
- 1925/26–1938/39: Europeans

Career statistics
Competition	First-class
Matches	10
Runs scored	379
Batting average	19.94
100s/50s	1/2
Top score	109
Catches/stumpings	8/–
- Source: Cricinfo, 7 June 2022

Robert Currie Summerhayes OBE (13 March 1903 – 7 June 1983) was an English first-class cricketer.

Summerhayes was born in British India at Quetta in March 1903. He was educated in England at St Lawrence College, before matriculating to Brasenose College, Oxford. After graduating from Oxford, Summerhayes returned to India.

In India, Summerhayes played in ten first-class cricket matches for the Europeans between 1926 and 1938, with nine of the matches coming in the Bombay Pentangular. He scored 379 runs in these matches at an average of 19.94, with two half centuries and one century; his century, a score of 109, came opening the batting against the Parsees in 1936. Summerhayes was a volunteer in the Bombay Battalion, being commissioned as a second lieutenant in April 1931.

Summerhayes was employed by the Burmah–Shell Oil Company and was made an Officer of the Order of the British Empire in the 1946 New Year Honours. With his wife, he returned to England from Rawalpindi in the early 1950s, where he became a dairy farmer at Mayfield, Sussex. He was prosecuted and fined £10 at Lewes Magistrates Courts in March 1960, having pleaded guilty to selling milk to which water had been added. Summerhayes died at Mayfield in June 1983.
