= Harry Godby =

New Zealand cricketer

Personal information
- Full name: Harry Eden Godby
- Born: 2 July 1847; Ramsgate, Kent, England
- Died: 1911 (aged 63–64); Newtown, New South Wales, Australia
- Role: Wicket-keeper
- Relatives: Michael Godby (brother)

Domestic team information
- Years: Team
- 1874/75–1875/76: Otago
- Source: ESPNcricinfo, 12 May 2016

Harry Eden Godby (2 July 1847 – 1911) was a New Zealand cricketer. He played two first-class matches for Otago, one in each of the 1874–75 and 1875–76 seasons.

Godby was born in England at Ramsgate in Kent in 1847, the son of a Church of England priest. He was educated at Marlborough College in Wiltshire. His brother, Michael Godby, also played cricket for Otago. Godby died in Australia in 1911.
