= Charles Levers =

New Zealand cricketer

Personal information
- Full name: Walter Charles Sidney Levers
- Born: 9 March 1864; Bingham, Nottinghamshire, England
- Died: 10 November 1922 (aged 58); Auckland, New Zealand
- Height: 6 ft 6 in (1.98 m)
- Batting: Right-handed
- Role: Batsman, occasional wicket-keeper

Domestic team information
- Years: Team
- 1895/96–1896/97: Wellington
- 1908/09: Hawke's Bay

Career statistics
Competition	First-class
Matches	6
Runs scored	176
Batting average	19.55
100s/50s	0/1
Top score	57 not out
Catches/stumpings	6/1
- Source: Cricinfo, 29 October 2019

Walter Charles Sidney Levers (9 March 1864 – 10 November 1922) was a New Zealand cricketer who played first-class cricket for Wellington and Hawke's Bay between 1896 and 1909.

== Life and career ==
Charles Levers was born in Bingham, Nottinghamshire. He played cricket for Nottinghamshire Colts before migrating to New Zealand in the 1880s. Standing about six feet six inches tall and weighing about 20 stone in later life, he was a batsman and occasional wicket-keeper. His best first-class match was for Wellington against Hawke's Bay in 1895-96 when he scored 45 and 57 not out, playing a major part in Wellington's avoiding defeat. He served as the honorary secretary of the Wellington Cricket Association for four years till 1901.

Levers was also adept at a wide range of other sports, including football, golf, boxing, athletics, tennis, swimming and billiards. He also sang with a light tenor voice at amateur concerts.

He worked at a number of occupations in New Zealand. He was manager of the town hall at Foxton in the Manawatū district soon after his arrival. In 1896 he was a hotel broker in Wellington. He was then for a time a commercial traveller before moving to Auckland and working in the wine-and-spirit business.

Levers died after contracting pneumonia while recuperating from an operation. He was survived by his wife, Ethel.
