= Dick Dalgleish =

New Zealand cricketer

Personal information
- Full name: Richard William Dalgleish
- Born: 1880; Galashiels, Selkirkshire, Scotland
- Died: 16 September 1955 (aged 75); Napier, New Zealand
- Batting: Right-handed
- Bowling: Right-arm fast-medium

Domestic team information
- Years: Team
- 1906-07 to 1907-08: Hawke's Bay

Career statistics
Competition	First-class
Matches	2
Runs scored	45
Batting average	11.25
100s/50s	0/0
Top score	26
Balls bowled	322
Wickets	10
Bowling average	11.90
5 wickets in innings	1
10 wickets in match	0
Best bowling	5/49
Catches/stumpings	1/0
- Source: CricketArchive, 26 July 2019

Richard William Dalgleish (1880 – 16 September 1955) was a New Zealand cricketer who played two matches of first-class cricket for Hawke's Bay in 1907 and 1908.

Dick Dalgleish was born in Scotland, and his family moved to New Zealand in 1893. His father, one of the proprietors of the Timaru Woollen Mills, died in June 1900 after falling from a train near Palmerston.

When the touring Lord Hawke's XI played a South Canterbury XVIII at Timaru in February 1903, Dalgleish took five wickets in each innings for South Canterbury. In February 1904 he took 7 for 34 (including a hat-trick) and 7 for 79 when South Canterbury beat Canterbury by seven wickets at Lancaster Park.

For Hawke's Bay, in his second first-class match, against Wellington in 1907-08, Dalgleish took 3 for 20 and 5 for 49. He later served as secretary and treasurer of the Hawke's Bay Cricket Association, secretary of the Napier Amateur Boxing Association, and was the organising secretary of the New Zealand Golf Championships held in Napier in 1919.

Dalgleish married Nita Kelly in Napier on 23 December 1908. They had one daughter. Nita died in 1948, Dick in 1955.
