= Bob Bishop (cricketer) =

New Zealand cricketer

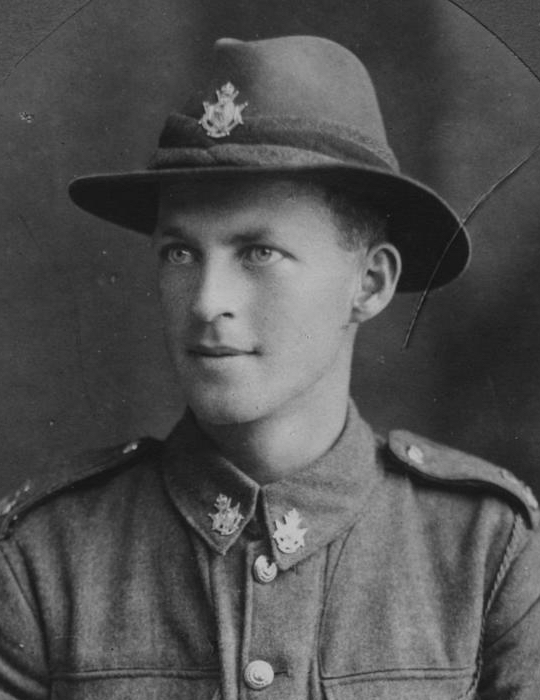
- Bishop during World War I

Personal information
- Full name: Robert Ernest Bishop
- Born: 16 April 1892; Wellington, New Zealand
- Died: 6 May 1969 (aged 77); Waipawa, New Zealand
- Height: 5 ft 10 in (1.78 m)
- Batting: Right-handed
- Relatives: Larry Bishop (brother)

Domestic team information
- Years: Team
- 1914-15 to 1920-21: Hawke's Bay

Career statistics
Competition	First-class
Matches	5
Runs scored	212
Batting average	21.20
100s/50s	0/2
Top score	61
Catches/stumpings	2/–
- Source: Cricinfo, 13 November 2021

Robert Ernest Bishop (16 April 1892 – 6 May 1969) was a New Zealand cricketer who played first-class cricket for Hawke's Bay from 1915 to 1921.

Bishop served as a sapper in the Middle East with the Mounted Signal Troop of the New Zealand Army in World War I. He married Doris Cropp in Napier in January 1920.

Bishop scored 61 and 60, batting in the middle order, when Hawke's Bay drew with the touring Australians in February 1921. The next highest score in the match for Hawke's Bay was 33. It was Hawke's Bay last match with first-class status, and also Bishop’s last first-class match.
