= Fred Laws (cricketer) =

New Zealand cricketer

Personal information
- Full name: Frederick Arthur Laws
- Born: 21 July 1877; Birmingham, Warwickshire, England
- Died: 1 April 1954 (aged 76); Wellington, New Zealand
- Bowling: Fast-medium

Domestic team information
- Years: Team
- 1896/97: Wellington
- 1897/98: Hawke's Bay
- 1905/06–1909/10: Wellington

Career statistics
Competition	First-class
Matches	12
Runs scored	233
Batting average	14.56
100s/50s	0/0
Top score	47
Balls bowled	750
Wickets	9
Bowling average	35.33
5 wickets in innings	0
10 wickets in match	0
Best bowling	3/20
Catches/stumpings	10/–
- Source: Cricinfo, 6 March 2018

Frederick Arthur Laws (21 July 1877 – 1 April 1954) was a cricketer who played first-class cricket for Wellington in New Zealand from 1897 to 1910, and one match for Hawke's Bay in 1898.

An opening bowler and middle-order batsman, Laws's best performance came in Wellington's match against the touring MCC in 1906-07. He took five wickets in the drawn match, showing a "promising turn of speed", and top-scored for Wellington with 47 with some bold stroke play. After he retired from playing he became an umpire, standing in one Plunket Shield match in 1912-13.

He also represented Wellington at rugby union, and was later a referee. He worked as a saddler and leather merchant in Wellington, and also sold sporting goods.
