= Tom Dent (cricketer) =

Australian cricketer and banker

Personal information
- Full name: Thomas Henry Dent
- Born: 1879; Sydney, New South Wales, Australia
- Died: 11 September 1929 (aged 49–50); Kyogle, New South Wales, Australia
- Batting: Right-handed
- Bowling: Right-arm leg-spin

Domestic team information
- Years: Team
- 1900-01 to 1901-02: Hawke's Bay

Career statistics
Competition	First-class
Matches	5
Runs scored	122
Batting average	17.42
100s/50s	0/1
Top score	56
Balls bowled
Wickets	35
Bowling average	15.48
5 wickets in innings	3
10 wickets in match	1
Best bowling	9/47
Catches/stumpings	4/0
- Source: Cricinfo, 1 October 2015

Thomas Henry Dent (1879 – 11 September 1929) was an Australian cricketer and banker who played first-class cricket for Hawke's Bay in New Zealand in 1901 and 1902.

== Career ==
Playing for Scinde in Napier club cricket in 1900-01, Dent took 67 wickets with his leg-spin at an average of 7.36. He played his first first-class match for Hawke's Bay in January 1901, taking 5 for 46 and 3 for 60 in an innings victory over Auckland. In his next match three months later, against Wellington, he took 9 for 47 and 3 for 63. The match finished in a draw with Hawke's Bay, needing 132 for victory, 123 for 8 at stumps on the second and final day.

He played his fifth and last match for Hawke's Bay in January 1902, taking 3 for 66 and 5 for 87 and scoring 56 and 30 not out in a six-wicket victory over Canterbury. He and the Hawke's Bay coach Albert Trott (who took 7 for 58 and 4 for 93 and scored 68 and 80 not out) bowled unchanged throughout both innings except for one over by a third bowler to enable them to change ends.

Dent moved to Sydney in July 1902 to work for the Bank of New South Wales. Starting as a clerk, he was appointed branch manager at Bangalow on the northern New South Wales coast, then transferred inland to Kyogle to manage the branch there. While working at Lismore, he married Mary McDonough there in 1908. He continued to play cricket until his death, appearing with success for district representative sides.

== Death ==
Dent killed himself in 1929, after developing depression subsequent to a severe case of influenza.
