= Colin Tilsley =

Colin B C Tilsley (23 January 1935 – 23 March 1981) was the founder of Gospel Literature Outreach.

Colin was born in Rajahmundry, India, to Crawford and Marjorie Tilsley, missionaries in the Godavari district of South India, where Crawford was a fourth generation missionary. Colin was educated in England from 1947 at St. Lawrence College, Ramsgate, an evangelical Church of England boarding school. He did national service in the British Army from 1954 and was married to Cynthia in 1957 in her native town of Launceston, Tasmania. They had four children.

They studied at Emmaus Bible School, Sydney, Australia, from 1960, and after graduating in 1961, Colin began work for them as Correspondence School Manager. He founded Gospel Literature Outreach in June 1965, and continued working for both organisations until prevented from doing so by increasing disability from total motor neurone disease. He died in 1981 in Sydney.
