= Te Whiti Park =

Cricket ground in New Zealand named after Māori spiritual leader Te Whiti o Rongomai

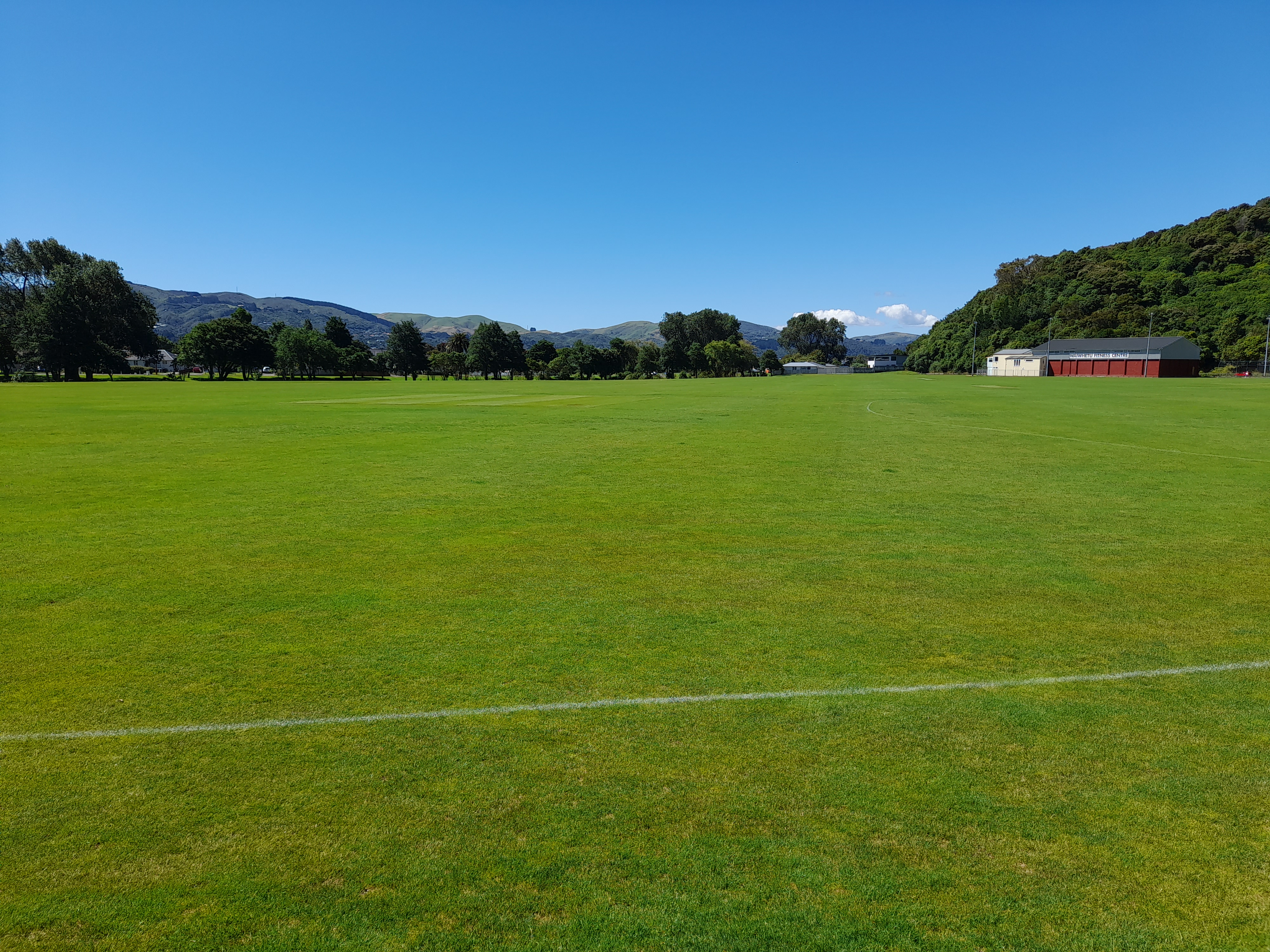
- The ground in 2024
- Interactive map of Te Whiti Park

Ground information
- Location: Lower Hutt, New Zealand
- Country: New Zealand
- Coordinates: 41°13′25″S 174°55′26″E
- Establishment: 1967 (first recorded match)

Team information
| Wellington Women | (1967–1984) |
- As of 1 January 2024; Source: Ground profile

Te Whiti Park is a cricket ground in Lower Hutt, Wellington, New Zealand.

== History ==
The park is named after the Māori spiritual leader Te Whiti o Rongomai, whose family lived in the area. The land in the areas belonged to Te Āti Awa who used the park to graze animals. In 1943 the Government took control of the land and it was used as a military vehicle park in World War II. Te Āti Awa accepted a £47,000 compensation payment for the land seizure, though much of it went to the Lower Hutt City Council for outstanding rates bills. After the war it was then leased to the council and used as a sports field until 1979 when it transferred to council ownership from the Crown.

The first recorded cricket match held on the ground came in 1967 for domestic women's first-class cricket. In 1978 the park hosted a one-day World Series Cricket match during the tour of New Zealand between the World XI and Australia. Australia won the game by 7 runs.

A riser overlooking the park was constructed by the council and opened in 2015.
