= Larry Bishop (cricketer) =

New Zealand cricketer

Personal information
- Full name: Harold Arthur Bishop
- Born: 28 December 1883; Wellington, New Zealand
- Died: 6 July 1963 (aged 79); Christchurch, New Zealand
- Batting: Right-handed
- Relatives: Bob Bishop (brother)

Domestic team information
- Years: Team
- 1903-04: Hawke's Bay
- 1905-06 to 1914-15: Canterbury

Career statistics
Competition	First-class
Matches	15
Runs scored	599
Batting average	23.96
100s/50s	0/4
Top score	98
Balls bowled	6
Wickets	1
Bowling average	10.00
5 wickets in innings	0
10 wickets in match	0
Best bowling	1/10
Catches/stumpings	10/0
- Source: CricketArchive, 17 February 2019

Harold Arthur "Larry" Bishop (28 December 1883 – 6 July 1963) was a New Zealand cricketer who played first-class cricket for Hawke's Bay and Canterbury from 1903 to 1915.

Larry Bishop scored 98 on his first-class debut for Hawke's Bay against Wellington in 1903-04 a few days before his 20th birthday. It was the highest score of the match, which Hawke's Bay won. He played for North Island against South Island a few weeks later. In late 1904 he moved to Christchurch.

He married Beatrice Theodora Wright in Wellington on 13 October 1906. Playing for the St Albans club, Bishop was one of the leading batsmen in Christchurch senior club cricket in the seasons leading to the First World War. He was the leading run-scorer in the competition from 1910–11 to 1914–15, with 2375 runs at an average of 40.2. In 1909 he scored 156 out of a team total of 213 in two hours, hitting eight sixes.

In 12 matches for Canterbury over 10 years, Bishop's best performance was 44 and 90 in the victory over Wellington in the Plunket Shield in 1913–14. In his last match, in 1914–15, he contributed 62 and 31 to yet another victory over Wellington.
