= Tom Reaney =

New Zealand cricketer (1909–1994)

Personal information
- Full name: Thomas Philip Lewis Reaney
- Born: 11 August 1909; Napier, New Zealand
- Died: 4 December 1994 (aged 85); Napier, New Zealand
- Batting: Left-handed
- Bowling: Right-arm medium

Domestic team information
- Years: Team
- 1927/28–1948/49: Wellington
- 1950/51: Central Districts

Career statistics
Competition	First-class
Matches	7
Runs scored	204
Batting average	15.69
100s/50s	0/1
Top score	85
Balls bowled	462
Wickets	4
Bowling average	51.50
5 wickets in innings	0
10 wickets in match	0
Best bowling	2/41
Catches/stumpings	3/–
- Source: CricketArchive, 28 December 2025

Thomas Philip Lewis Reaney (11 August 1909 – 4 December 1994) was a New Zealand cricketer. He played in seven first-class matches for Wellington and Central Districts from 1927 to 1951.
