= George Hawke =

New Zealand cricketer (1871–1950)

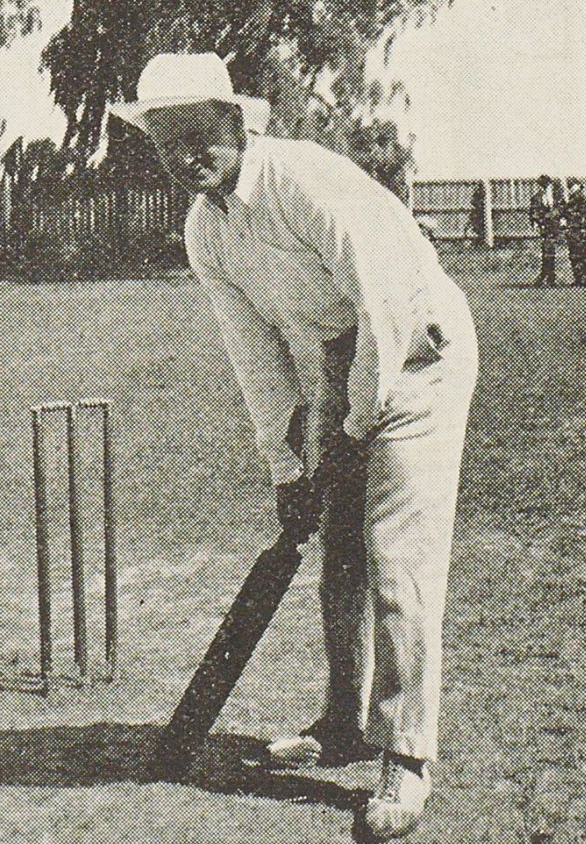
- Hawke in 1903

Personal information
- Born: 3 January 1871; Greytown, Wairarapa, New Zealand
- Died: 19 September 1950 (aged 79); Napier, New Zealand
- Batting: Right-handed

Domestic team information
- Years: Team
- 1900-01 to 1910-11: Hawke's Bay

Career statistics
Competition	First-class
Matches	14
Runs scored	580
Batting average	22.30
100s/50s	0/4
Top score	87
Balls bowled	48
Wickets	1
Bowling average	42.00
5 wickets in innings	0
10 wickets in match	0
Best bowling	1/25
Catches/stumpings	5/–
- Source: Cricinfo, 9 November 2021

George Hawke (3 January 1871 – 19 September 1950) was a New Zealand cricketer who played first-class cricket for Hawke's Bay from 1901 to 1911.

Hawke was born in Greytown, Wairarapa, into a farming family. He began working for the Post Office at Greytown, then transferred to Foxton before moving to the Napier telegraph office, where he served until 1911, when he was transferred to Waihi. During World War I he was the postmaster at the Trentham Military Camp in Upper Hutt, and his last appointment before he retired in 1923 was as postmaster in Te Kūiti in the King Country region.

While living in Napier, Hawke was one of the leading batsmen for Hawke's Bay. Short and sturdy, and strong on the leg side, he scored 87 on his first-class debut in January 1901, adding 110 for the seventh wicket with Hugh Lusk to help Hawke's Bay to an innings victory over Auckland. He scored 22 and 84 against Wellington in February 1909.
