= Jocelyn Kallender =

New Zealand cricketer (1870–1953)

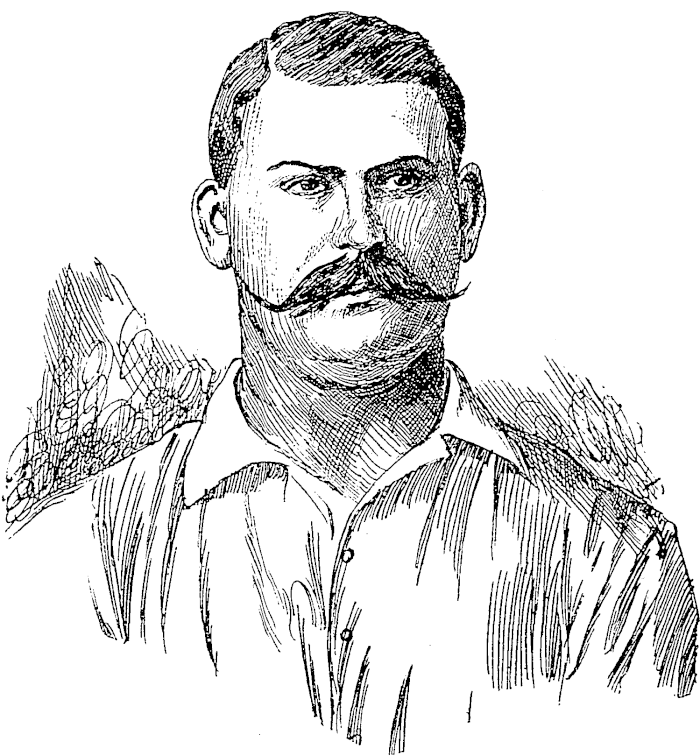

Personal information
- Full name: Jocelyn Arthur Kallender
- Born: 13 February 1870; Brentford, Middlesex, England
- Died: 7 October 1953 (aged 83); Auckland, New Zealand
- Height: 6 ft 3 1/2 in (1.92 m)
- Bowling: Fast

Domestic team information
- Years: Team
- 1893/94–1904/05: Auckland
- FC debut: 2 December 1893 Auckland v Wellington
- Last FC: 24 March 1905 Auckland v Hawke's Bay

Career statistics
Competition	First-class
Matches	12
Runs scored	389
Batting average	18.52
100s/50s	0/1
Top score	55
Balls bowled	791
Wickets	16
Bowling average	21.12
5 wickets in innings	0
10 wickets in match	0
Best bowling	3/7
Catches/stumpings	5/–
- Source: ESPNcricinfo, 7 April 2019

Jocelyn Arthur Kallender (13 February 1870 – 7 October 1953) was a New Zealand cricketer, playing 12 first-class matches for Auckland between 1893 and 1904. He also won the hammer throw at the New Zealand national athletics championships in 1897.

== Biography ==
Kallender was born in Brentford, Middlesex, England, on 13 February 1870, and was baptised in the parish of Heston on 16 April that year. His parents were Katherine Cicelia Kallender and George Kallender, a major in the Madras Staff Corps. As a child, Kallender lived in India with his parents, and he moved to New Zealand in 1892. Kallender worked at the Auckland branch of the Bank of New Zealand for 32 years until his retirement in 1928.

On 14 January 1929, Kallender married Dorothea Mabel Takle (née Gribble) in Auckland.

Kallender died in Auckland on 7 October 1953, and he was buried at Purewa Cemetery. His widow, Dorothea, died in 1957.

== Cricket ==
Auckland in January 1904, Kallender second from right in the middle row

Kallender stood six feet three and a half inches tall and weighed 18 stone (about 114 kilograms) during his cricket career. He played 12 first-class matches for Auckland over as many seasons, from 1893/94 to 1904/05. A fast bowler, he took 16 wickets at an average of 21.12, with best bowling figures of 3 for 7. With the bat, he was reputedly the hardest hitter in New Zealand and a very fast scorer. He scored 389 runs in 22 innings, with a high score of 55 and an average of 18.52.

== Other sports ==
At the 1897 New Zealand national athletics championships, Kallender won the hammer throw representing Auckland, with a best distance of 93 ft 7 in (28.52 m). He also played both rugby union and association football, and was active in rowing before moving to New Zealand.
