= Jack Wolstenholme =

English cricketer and storekeeper

Personal information
- Full name: John Wolstenholme
- Born: 1851; Rishton, Lancashire, England
- Died: 5 February 1914 (aged 62–63); Hastings, New Zealand

Domestic team information
- Years: Team
- 1886–87 to 1898–99: Hawke's Bay

Career statistics
Competition	First-class
Matches	10
Runs scored	280
Batting average	17.50
100s/50s	1/1
Top score	103
Balls bowled	450
Wickets	14
Bowling average	9.78
5 wickets in innings	0
10 wickets in match	0
Best bowling	4/9
Catches/stumpings	6/0
- Source: CricketArchive, 8 January 2017

John Wolstenholme (1851 – 5 February 1914) was a cricketer who played first-class cricket for Hawke's Bay from 1887 to 1898.

== Life and career ==
Wolstenholme was born in Lancashire. He became a school teacher, and married Mary Anne Leach in Darwen in July 1880. They moved in the 1880s to New Zealand, where he taught in the Hawke's Bay area, conducting the school at Norsewood.

Wolstenholme was an all-rounder at cricket. In November 1892, he was described by the Hawke's Bay Herald thus: "has a good defence and splendid execution, and hits very hard when once set", and a fast bowler "with rather a low delivery" who "always gets wickets". He usually opened the batting, as he did when he made his highest first-class score of 103 in an innings victory over Taranaki in 1897–98. In Hawke's Bay's victory over Taranaki in 1891–92 he took 4 for 24 and 4 for 9.

After his playing career ended, he umpired several of Hawke's Bay's home matches between 1899 and 1901.

Wolstenholme was appointed headmaster of the school at Port Ahuriri, Napier, in 1890, and the school's academic and attendance records improved markedly under his stewardship. After retiring from the position after some years, he was the storekeeper at the small town of Ongaonga, in Central Hawke's Bay. In June 1906, he disappeared for several days before being found in Wellington living under an assumed name. He returned to Napier to live, working as a relieving teacher until his sudden death in February 1914. Mary Anne and several grown-up children survived him.
