= Sidney Redgrave =

Australian cricketer

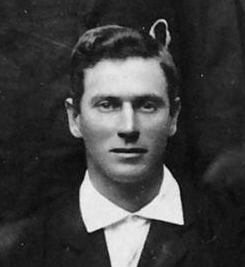
- Sid Redgrave in 1908

Personal information
- Full name: John Sidney Redgrave
- Born: 5 August 1878; North Sydney, New South Wales, Australia
- Died: 3 August 1958 (aged 79); West End, Queensland, Australia
- Batting: Right-handed
- Bowling: Right-arm medium pace
- Relatives: Bill Redgrave (brother)

Domestic team information
- Years: Team
- 1904/05–1905/06: New South Wales
- 1906/07–1921/22: Queensland

Career statistics
Competition	First-class
Matches	26
Runs scored	940
Batting average	20.88
100s/50s	1/3
Top score	107
Balls bowled	2,741
Wickets	41
Bowling average	37.56
5 wickets in innings	0
10 wickets in match	0
Best bowling	4/19
Catches/stumpings	19/0
- Source: ESPNcricinfo, 15 May 2018

Sidney John Redgrave (5 August 1878 – 3 August 1958) was an Australian cricketer. He played 26 first-class matches for New South Wales and Queensland between 1904/05 and 1921/22.

== Early life ==
Born John Sydney, he was always known as Sidney John. He was born in Sydney to Mary Kielly and Thomas Redgrave. He attended Newington College.

After a few games for New South Wales, Sid Redgrave took up a coaching position in Brisbane in 1907. He represented Queensland regularly between 1907 and 1921, with a highest score of 107 in a team total of 181 against New South Wales in 1911/12. He continued to coach in Brisbane after his first-class career ended, and was also a state selector. His younger brother Bill left Sydney in 1903 to play first-class cricket in New Zealand.

== See also ==
- List of New South Wales representative cricketers
