= Guy Gregson-Ellis =

English cricketer and British Army officer (1895–1969)

Personal information
- Full name: Guy Saxon Llewellyn Gregson-Ellis
- Born: 3 November 1895; Kensington, Middlesex, England
- Died: 12 August 1969 (aged 73); Banbury, Oxfordshire, England
- Batting: Unknown
- Bowling: Unknown

Domestic team information
- Years: Team
- 1920–1923: Berkshire
- 1925/26–1926/27: Europeans

Career statistics
| Competition | First-class |
|---|---|
| Matches | 4 |
| Runs scored | 116 |
| Batting average | 14.50 |
| 100s/50s | –/– |
| Top score | 45 |
| Balls bowled | 96 |
| Wickets | 0 |
| Bowling average | – |
| 5 wickets in innings | – |
| 10 wickets in match | – |
| Best bowling | – |
| Catches/stumpings | 4/– |
- Source: ESPNcricinfo, 5 February 2019

Guy Saxon Llewellyn Gregson-Ellis MC (3 November 1895 – 12 August 1969) was an English first-class cricketer and British Army officer. He had a military career that spanned 32 years and two world wars, as well as appearing in four first-class cricket matches for the Europeans cricket team in British India.

== Early life and World War I ==
Gregson-Ellis was born at Kensington to Charles James Gregson-Ellis and his wife Mildred Agnes Scholefield. He attended Charterhouse School in 1909. After leaving Charterhouse, Gregson-Ellis attended the Royal Military College at Sandhurst, upon graduating he entered into the Royal Berkshire Regiment as a second lieutenant shortly before the outbreak of World War I.

While serving in the war during December 1914, he was promoted to the temporary rank of lieutenant, with him obtaining the rank permanently in March 1915, which was antedated to January 1915. In July 1915, he was promoted to the temporary rank of captain, with this rank being relinquished in July 1916. He was awarded the Military Cross in the 1916 Birthday Honours. He took part in the Battle of the Somme from July–November 1916, playing a key role in helping to reorganise the 2nd Battalion after heavy losses during the battles first day. He later obtained the rank of captain permanently in February 1917.

== Post-war first-class cricket ==
Following the war, Gregson-Ellis made his debut for Berkshire in minor counties cricket in 1920, with Gregson-Ellis making fifteen appearances in the Minor Counties Championship between 1920 and 1923. He was made an adjutant in July 1922, with him ceasing to be an adjutant in July 1925. While stationed in British India, he made his debut in first-class cricket for the Europeans against the Sikhs at Lahore in the 1925/26 Lahore Tournament. He made three further first-class appearances for the Europeans, playing in the final of the 1925/26 tournament against the Muslims cricket team, before making two appearances against the Parsees and the Hindus in the 1926/27 Bombay Quadrangular. He scored 116 runs across his four first-class matches, with a top score of 45.

He retired from military service in January 1931 and ceased to belong to the reserve of officers having reached the age limit for liability to be recalled. He returned to service in World War II with the Royal Berkshire Regiment and was promoted to the rank of brevet major in April 1940. He once again retired from service following the war, whereby he was made an honorary lieutenant colonel in May 1946.

He died in hospital at Banbury, Oxfordshire in August 1969, at the age of 73.
