= Bill Redgrave =

New Zealand cricketer

Personal information
- Full name: William Patrick Redgrave
- Born: 23 January 1881; St Leonards, Sydney, Australia
- Died: 28 November 1931 (aged 50); Crows Nest, Sydney, Australia
- Batting: Right-handed
- Relatives: Sidney Redgrave (brother)

Domestic team information
- Years: Team
- 1903-04 to 1905-06: Wellington
- 1906-07 to 1908-09: Hawke's Bay

Career statistics
Competition	First-class
Matches	9
Runs scored	414
Batting average	24.35
100s/50s	1/1
Top score	165
Balls bowled	893
Wickets	20
Bowling average	29.10
5 wickets in innings	1
10 wickets in match	0
Best bowling	5/37
Catches/stumpings	3/0
- Source: Cricinfo, 15 May 2018

William Patrick Redgrave (23 January 1881 – 28 November 1931) was a cricketer who played first-class cricket for Wellington and Hawke's Bay in New Zealand from 1903 to 1909.

== Life and career ==
Born in Sydney, Redgrave moved to Wellington from Sydney in 1903, taking a position as a groundsman at Basin Reserve. He began representing Wellington in December 1903.

He had his best season in 1905-06 when he finished at the top of the New Zealand first-class batting averages with 286 runs at an average of 57.20. In Wellington's match against Hawke's Bay he opened the batting on the first day and made 165, which set a Wellington first-class record that stood for several years. He was third out when the score was 245 for 3, after hitting four sixes and 22 fours. Largely thanks to his innings Wellington made 409 for 8 on the first day despite losing time to rain. He did not bowl in Hawke's Bay's first innings, but he opened the bowling in their second innings and took 5 for 37, bowling unchanged through the innings of 59 all out.

Redgrave moved to Hastings in 1906 and played a few matches for Hawke's Bay. He died in Sydney in 1931, leaving a widow, Annie, and two daughters.
