= John Ironmonger (writer) =

British writer

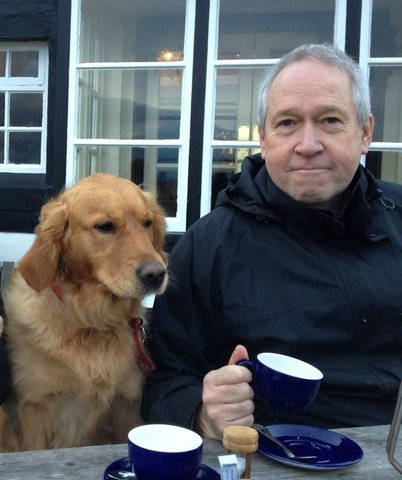
- John Ironmonger and Poppy
- Born: J. W. Ironmonger; 8 July 1954 (age 72); Nairobi, Kenya
- Education: PhD Zoology
- Alma mater: St Lawrence College; University of Nottingham; University of Liverpool
- Occupation: Novelist
- Spouse: Sue
- Children: Zoe; Jonathan
- Website: Writer's Blog John Ironmonger

John Ironmonger (born 8 July 1954), also published as J. W. Ironmonger, is a British writer and literary novelist whose debut novel was shortlisted for the Costa First Novel Award in 2012. His novel Not Forgetting the Whale (also known as: The Whale at the End of the World) was an international bestseller. His works have been translated into fifteen languages.

== Biography ==
=== Life and career ===
Ironmonger was born in Nairobi, Kenya, and attended Kenton College, a boarding school in Nairobi, and later St Lawrence College, a boarding school in Ramsgate, Kent, before studying as a Zoologist at Nottingham and Liverpool universities. His PhD thesis was a study of the ecology of freshwater leeches. He lectured for a short while at the University of Ilorin, Nigeria before taking up a career in healthcare computing in the UK. His wife Sue is a former RSPCA farm assessor and former council member of Chester Zoo. The couple believe they may be the only living Europeans to have seen a Javan rhino with a calf.

In 2017 John and Sue Ironmonger moved to Parkgate in Cheshire where they now live. They have two children, Zoe and Jonathan.

=== Writing ===
John Ironmonger's first published book was The Good Zoo Guide, a critical review of more than 130 UK zoos, safari parks, aquaria and bird gardens, published by Harper Collins in 1994.

His first novel, The Notable Brain of Maximilian Ponder, was published by Orion Books in 2012 after a publisher's auction for the manuscript. The novel explores the short and eventful life of a man who sets out to catalogue his own brain.

In 2014 his second novel, The Coincidence Authority (published as Coincidence by Harper Perennial in the USA), told a tale of love and predetermination set in conflict-torn Uganda. This novel in French translation (as Le Génie des Coincidences translated by Christine Barbaste and published by Editions Stock) won Le Prix des Lecteurs (Reader’s Prize) at Littératures Européennes in Cognac (France) in November 2015. The novel won also the prize Prix Bouchon de cultures. Closures Delage cie ("Les Bouchages Delage") This award was created by the company in 2008 in connection with the guest authors.

John Ironmonger's third novel, Not Forgetting the Whale (Sans Oublier la Baleine in France), is a semi-apocalyptic story set in Cornwall. In German translation as, 'Der Wal und das Ende der Welt,' it reached Number 1 in the Spiegel bestseller chart in December 2020. The novel was republished in the UK as 'The Whale at the End of the World.'

A fourth novel, 'The Many Lives of Heloise Starchild,' was published by Orion Books in August 2020. The novel imagines a line of women who inherit memories from their mothers.

A novella entitled 'The Year of the Dugong' (Das Jahr des Dugong) was published by S. Fischer Verlag in German to coincide with COP26 2021 United Nations Climate Change Conference. The novella addresses issues of climate change.

In 2022 Ironmonger parted company with Orion Books. A novel, set as a companion story to 'Not Forgetting the Whale,' focussing on the climate crisis was published in German in 2023 as 'Der Eisbär und die Hoffnung auf Morgen,' and as 'The Wager and the Bear,' in 2025 by Manchester based 'Fly on the Wall Press'.

== Works ==
- The Good Zoo Guide, Harper Collins, 1994, ISBN 978-0-0021-9921-6
- The Notable Brain of Maximilian Ponder, George Weidenfeld & Nicolson, 2012, ISBN 978-0-2978-6609-1
- The Coincidence Authority, Weidenfeld & Nicolson, 2013, ISBN 978-0-2978-6612-1
- Not Forgetting the Whale, Weidenfeld & Nicolson, 2015, ISBN 978-0-2976-0821-9
- The Many Lives of Heloise Starchild, Orion Books, 2020, ISBN 978-0-2976-0824-0
