= Charles Smith (cricketer, born 1864) =

New Zealand cricketer, cricket administrator and businessman

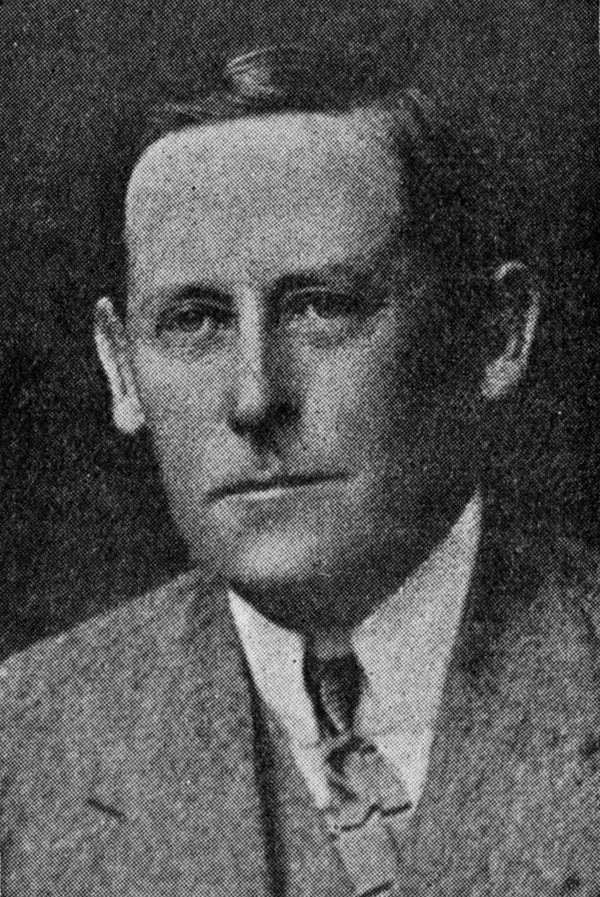

Personal information
- Full name: Charles Robert Smith
- Born: 18 April 1864; Sydney, Australia
- Died: 25 May 1920 (aged 56); Auckland, New Zealand
- Bowling: Left-arm spin

Domestic team information
- Years: Team
- 1891-92 to 1892-93: Hawke's Bay

Career statistics
Competition	First-class
Matches	4
Runs scored	35
Batting average	8.75
100s/50s	0/0
Top score	15 not out
Balls bowled	493
Wickets	33
Bowling average	5.81
5 wickets in innings	4
10 wickets in match	1
Best bowling	7/20
Catches/stumpings	0/0
- Source: Cricket Archive, 8 January 2017

Charles Robert Smith (18 April 1864 – 25 May 1920) was a New Zealand cricketer, cricket administrator and businessman who played four matches of first-class cricket for Hawke's Bay in 1892. He was one of the founders of the New Zealand Cricket Council in 1894.

== Life and business career ==
Born in Sydney, Smith joined the Alliance Assurance Company as a young man in Australia. He took up the position as the company's manager in Napier, New Zealand, in 1890, before becoming manager in Christchurch in 1892, in Dunedin in 1897, and in Wellington in 1900. He became general manager for New Zealand in 1916, residing in the Wellington suburb of Wadestown.

In March 1920 Smith took six months leave of absence in the hope that a trip to California would assist his failing health. However, his health gave way on the trip and he returned having only reached Honolulu, and died soon after his return to Auckland in May. He was survived by his wife, Alice. They had no children.

== Cricket playing career ==
A left-arm spin bowler, Smith varied his pace subtly and was able to move the ball either way off the pitch. In his four first-class matches for Hawke's Bay he took 33 wickets at an average of 5.81, with a strike rate of a wicket every 15 deliveries.

In his first match, against Taranaki in January 1892, Smith bowled only in the first innings, taking 4 for 9 off seven five-ball overs. In his second match, three months later, he bowled unchanged throughout both of Taranaki's innings, taking 13 wickets for 33 (7 for 20 and 6 for 13) off 21.5 five-ball overs. Hawke's Bay won both matches easily. With 17 wickets at an average of 2.47, Smith was the leading bowler in the short New Zealand first-class season.

In 1892-93 Smith played two matches which Hawke's Bay lost against stronger opposition. Against Wellington in November 1892 he took 3 for 25 and 6 for 60 off a total of 35.1 six-ball overs. In December, against Otago, he took 7 for 65 off 28 five-ball overs in an innings defeat. An Otago reporter described Smith as “as good a bowler as Otago has met for some years”.

== Cricket administrative career ==
After moving to Christchurch, Smith joined the Lancaster Park club, where he served as honorary treasurer and topped the bowling in 1893-94 with an average of 7. He also topped the club's bowling in 1895-96, again with an average of 7. He served on the committee of the Canterbury Cricket Association.

In December 1894, as a delegate from Hawke's Bay, Smith attended the conference in Christchurch at which the New Zealand Cricket Council was formed. He was elected honorary secretary of the Council, and served in that position from 1894-95 to 1896-97. He was the main New Zealand negotiator in getting the New South Wales cricket team to tour New Zealand in 1895-96. When the Australian team visited in November 1896 he travelled with the team through New Zealand. At the time he expressed the hope that New Zealand players would in future be included in Australian teams to tour England.

The headquarters of the NZCC being in Christchurch, Smith resigned from his position on the Council in late 1897 when he moved from Christchurch to Dunedin. The 1898 annual report of the NZCC stated: “Those who had watched the advancement of the Council from its initiation would know it was mainly, and perhaps entirely, through Mr Smith’s efforts that the Council had done such good work, and was in such a flourishing condition.”

Smith played for the Carisbrook club in Dunedin. In 1897-98 he was the third-highest wicket-taker in the competition, with 47 wickets at 12.9. He served as honorary secretary of the Otago Cricket Association. During the Boer War he was honorary secretary of the Otago Patriotic Fund Committee.
