= Oxley Oval =

- Interactive map of Oxley Oval
- Location: Pacific Drive, Port Macquarie, New South Wales
- Coordinates: 31°25′56″S 152°55′18″E
- Owner: Port Macquarie-Hastings Council
- Surface: Grass

Oxley Oval is an Australian cricket ground situated in Port Macquarie, New South Wales which hosted a 1979 World Series Cricket (WSC) match between the WSC West Indian XI and WSC World XI sides. The match, which began on 2 January, saw a seven-wicket West Indian victory thanks largely to four wickets by Wayne Daniel and a score of 83 by Viv Richards.
