= South Canterbury cricket team =

New Zealand cricket team

Personnel
- Owner: South Canterbury Cricket Association

Team information
- Founded: 1893
- Home ground: Aorangi Oval, Timaru

History
- Hawke Cup wins: 1
- Official website: SCCA

The South Canterbury cricket team represents the South Canterbury region of New Zealand. It is one of the 21 teams from around New Zealand that compete in the Hawke Cup. Its headquarters are at Aorangi Oval in Timaru, where South Canterbury play most of their home matches.

== History ==
Cricket was probably first played in the region in the early 1860s. The Timaru Cricket Club was formed in 1864. A South Canterbury XXII captained by Michael Godby played the touring Australian team at Timaru Cricket Ground in January 1881; the Australians won easily.

The South Canterbury Cricket Association was formed in 1893, and a competition contested by Ashburton, Geraldine, Temuka and Timaru began in the 1893-94 season. South Canterbury continued to play occasional matches against touring teams, and began a regular series of matches against Canterbury. In the match in February 1904 at Lancaster Park, Dick Dalgleish took seven wickets in each innings and Andrew Barron hit a century to help South Canterbury to victory over Canterbury by seven wickets.

South Canterbury were one of the eight teams that competed in the inaugural Hawke Cup in 1910–11. They have competed regularly since the 1960s. Their only title came in January 2000, when they beat Canterbury Country; their captain was Todd Elliotte, one of only four people to play 100 matches for South Canterbury.

The senior clubs of the South Canterbury Cricket Association are Celtic, Geraldine, Pleasant Point, Star, Temuka, Timaru Boys High School, Timaru, Twizel and Waimate.
