= Charles Tuke (cricketer, born 1858) =

English-born clergyman and cricketer in New Zealand

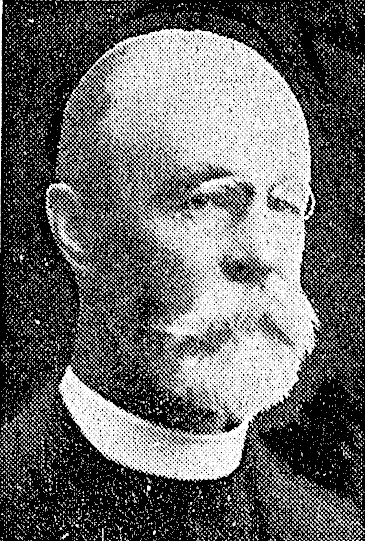
The Rev. C. L. Tuke

Charles Lawrence Tuke (3 August 1858 – 30 December 1929) was an English-born cricketer and clergyman in New Zealand.

== Life and career ==
Tuke was born in Sittingbourne, Kent, and died in Remuera, Auckland. He played for Hawke's Bay in a single first-class cricket match in December 1884. He was also a keen tennis player, playing in the first round of the New Zealand Championship in 1886, 1897, and 1901. Tuke's brother Edward Henry Tuke also played cricket, for the minor county of Herefordshire.

Tuke was born into a religious family, the fifth son of the Rev. Francis Edward Tuke, vicar of Borden in Kent. Tuke was educated at Haileybury College in England and at St John's College, Auckland. He was ordained a deacon in 1881 and a priest in 1882, and served at St John's, Napier, from 1881 to 1883, at All Saints, Taradale, from 1883 to 1893, St Mary's, Waipukurau, from 1893 to 1908, and at St Augustine's in Napier from 1908 to 1916. He was appointed archdeacon of Tauranga in 1916, and then served as vicar at Ellerslie from 1921 until he retired in 1923.

Tuke was also an active freemason. He and his wife Mary (née Tiffen) had seven children, four boys and three girls. Their son, Hugh, also played first-class cricket for Hawke's Bay.
