= Nelson Cricket Ground =

Cricket ground

Coordinates: 39°38′18.02″S 176°50′58.96″E

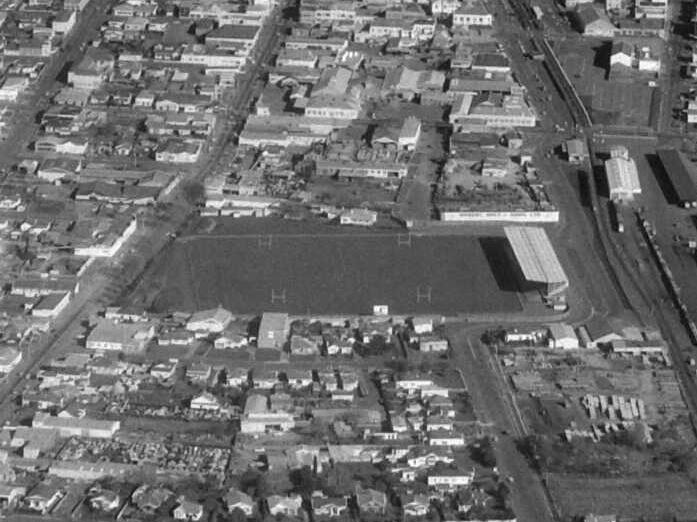
- The ground in 1969
- Interactive map of Nelson Cricket Ground

Ground information
- Location: Hastings, New Zealand
- Country: New Zealand
- Establishment: 1878 (first recorded match)

Team information
Central Districts	(1999–2001)
Hawke's Bay	(1914–1915)
- As of 2 November 2011; Source: Ground profile

Nelson Cricket Ground was a cricket ground in Hastings, Hawke's Bay, New Zealand.

The first recorded match held on the ground came in February 1878 when Hawke's Bay played the touring Australians. The New Zealand Times referred to the match as taking place "in Mr Braithwaite's paddock at Hastings, about a mile from the railway station".

It was known as the "Heretaunga School ground" until 1913, when the owners, Mr and Mrs W. Nelson, sold it to a trust for use as a sports ground for the local community and it was named Nelson Cricket Ground in their honour. In 1920 the ground was bought by the Hastings Borough Council.

The ground held its first first-class match in 1914 when Hawke's Bay played Wellington. Two further first-class matches were held there, one in 1914 when Hawke's Bay played the touring Australians and one in 1915 when Hawke's Bay played Canterbury in the 1914/15 Plunket Shield.

Other sports were also played at the ground. The New Zealand and England women's hockey teams played an international there in August 1914 in front of a crowd of 5000.
