= Hawke's Bay cricket team =

New Zealand cricket team

Team information
- Colours: Black & White
- Founded: 1882
- Home ground: McLean Park, Napier

History
- Hawke Cup wins: 12
- Official website: Hawke's Bay Cricket Association

The Hawke's Bay cricket team, representing the Hawke's Bay region of New Zealand, played first-class cricket between 1883–84 and 1920–21, and competed in the Plunket Shield in the 1914–15 and 1920–21 seasons. The side has continued to appear in minor cricket and is one of the 21 teams from around New Zealand that compete in the Hawke Cup, where it was the dominant team from 2020 to 2024.

== First-class history ==
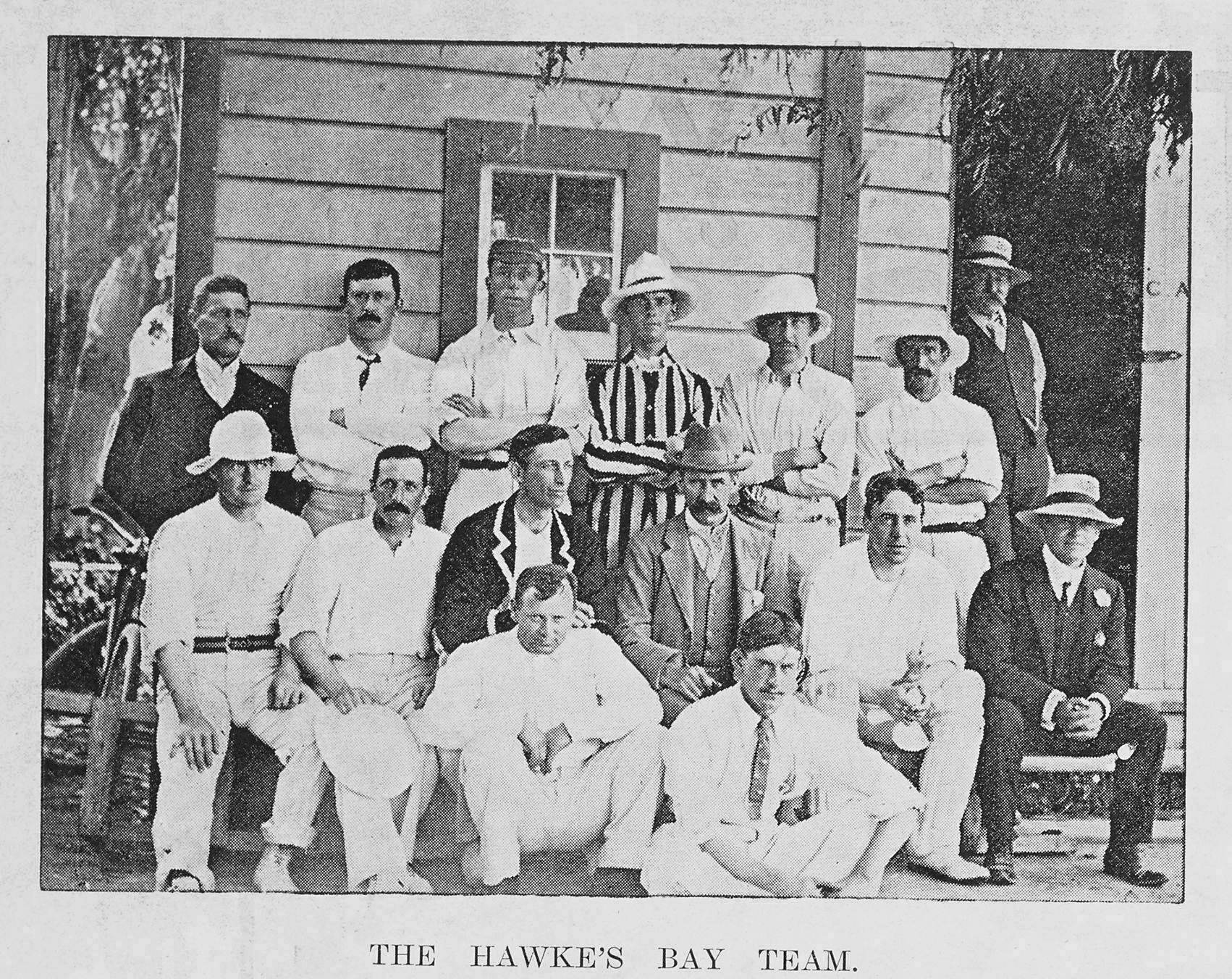
The Hawke's Bay team that beat Wellington in 1903

In their first match at first-class level, against Wellington at the Basin Reserve in February 1884, Hawke's Bay were dismissed for just 32 in their second innings thanks to Joseph Firth's remarkable return of 8 for 13 from 13 four-ball overs. In their next match, in 1884–85, they beat Wellington at Napier Recreation Ground by eight wickets.

They lost their next three matches, all against Wellington, before trouncing Taranaki in two matches in 1891–92. In the first of these matches they dismissed Taranaki for 70 and 39 and the game was over in one day. In the second match Hawke's Bay made 128 then dismissed Taranaki for 35 and 29.

Hawke's Bay's matches remained low-scoring affairs. They did not reach a total of 200 until their 17th match in 1895–96, when they made 207 against Wellington in a drawn match. Their first individual century came in 1897–98, when Hugh Lusk made 119 against Canterbury. However, low scores were the norm in New Zealand at the time: in the eight first-class matches in New Zealand in the 1897–98 season, only two centuries were scored, Lusk's and one by another Hawke's Bay batsman, Jack Wolstenholme. A large victory was won in December 1903 by 96 runs against Wellington in Napier with both Hawke's Bay innings exceeding 200 runs. The top score was 98 by Larry Bishop (his highest first-class score).

Hawke's Bay played 53 first-class matches, for 11 wins, 35 losses and seven draws. Twenty-four of those matches were against their neighbours, Wellington; Hawke's Bay won six of these and lost 14. They lost both their Plunket Shield matches (against Canterbury in 1914–15 and Auckland in 1920–21) by an innings.

=== Leading first-class players ===
Hugh Lusk made three of Hawke's Bay's five first-class centuries. He was by far Hawke's Bay's outstanding batsman: in 28 matches he scored 1395 runs at an average of 28.46, and also took 40 wickets at 22.85, as well as captaining the side in most of his matches and representing New Zealand.

The highest first-class score for Hawke's Bay was 134 against Wellington in 1914–15 by Jack Board, the English Test player who coached in Hawke's Bay for several seasons before World War I. The best innings bowling figures were 9 for 47 by Tom Dent against Wellington in 1900–01, and the best match figures were 13 for 33 (7 for 20 and 6 for 13) by Charles Smith in the second match against Taranaki in 1891–92.

== Since 1920–21 ==
Along with Southland, Hawke's Bay lost their first-class status after the 1920–21 season, leaving just four first-class teams in New Zealand: Auckland, Canterbury, Otago and Wellington. In reorganising domestic first-class cricket, the New Zealand Cricket Council chose only those teams that could afford to travel to take part in an annual round robin tournament for the Plunket Shield. In the 1920s Hawke's Bay played several overseas teams in non-first-class matches, including Australia, the MCC, New South Wales, Queensland and the Melbourne Cricket Club, all at Nelson Park.

Hawke's Bay began competing in the Hawke Cup in the 1922–23 season. They have won the Hawke Cup 12 times. Their first victory was in 1946–47. They have dominated the competition in recent years, holding the title from February 2020 to November 2022, and from November 2023 through to the end of the 2023–24 season undefeated.

In 1950–51 the Central Districts cricket team began competing at first-class level in the Plunket Shield. Tom Reaney from Hawke's Bay was in Central Districts' inaugural Plunket Shield team in December 1950.

The Hawke's Bay Cricket Association is one of Central Districts' eight constituent associations. The eight associations compete against each other annually for the Chapple Cup and the Mike Shrimpton Trophy.

== Grounds ==
Hawke's Bay played first-class matches on the following four home grounds:

- Recreation Ground, Napier
- Farndon Park, Clive
- Nelson Cricket Ground, Hastings
- Nelson Park, Napier

As well as Nelson Cricket Ground and Nelson Park, Hawke's Bay has also used the following grounds for Hawke Cup matches:

- McLean Park, Napier
- Cornwall Park, Hastings
- Anderson Park, Havelock North
- Forest Gate Domain, Ongaonga

McLean Park has also been a regular home ground for Central Districts since 1951–52, and has been used as a Test ground since 1978–79. Nelson Park has also been used by Central Districts since 1985–86.
