= New Zealand cricket team in South Africa in 1953–54 =

International cricket tour

	South Africa	New Zealand
- Dates: 11 December 1953 – 9 February 1954
Captains	JE Cheetham	GO Rabone

Test series
- Result: South Africa won the 5-match series 4–0
Most runs	DJ McGlew (351)	B Sutcliffe (305)
Most wickets	NAT Adcock (24)	AR MacGibbon (22)

The New Zealand national cricket team toured South Africa from October 1953 to February 1954 and played a five match Test series against the South Africa national cricket team. South Africa won the Test series 4–0. The tour was the first by a representative New Zealand team to South Africa and the tourists embarked on their visit without having won a Test match since they had been granted full member status of the Imperial Cricket Conference in 1930. (Note: New Zealand had played in 26 Test matches before the tour began, failing to win any of them. They won their first Test in 1956, beating West Indies at Auckland in their 45th Test match.)

South Africa were captained by Jack Cheetham and New Zealand by Geoff Rabone. (Note: Rabone was injured immediately before the fourth Test started and was unable to play again on the tour. Bert Sutcliffe captained the New Zealanders in the last two test matches.)

== Tour party ==
The New Zealand team was captained by Geoff Rabone with Bert Sutcliffe as vice-captain. Rabone had been reluctant to tour but was chosen as captain ahead of Merv Wallace, who had captained New Zealand when South Africa had toured in 1952–53. Despite having retired from Test cricket in 1951, the experienced Walter Hadlee was asked to captain the team but declined and Rabone agreed to lead the tour. Wallace chose not to join the tour after Rabone was appointed. Sutcliffe, who was New Zealand's outstanding post-war batsman, captained the New Zealanders during the fourth and fifth Test matches after Rabone broke a bone in his foot.

The average age of the team was 25. With the aim of establishing a high standard of fielding, some older or slower players were overlooked, including the spinners Tom Burtt and Alex Moir, and the opening batsman Gordon Leggat. Leggat later joined the team for the Australian leg of the tour, replacing the injured Rabone.

- Geoff Rabone (captain)
- Bert Sutcliffe (vice-captain)
- John Beck
- Bill Bell
- Bob Blair
- Murray Chapple
- Eric Dempster
- Ian Leggat
- Tony MacGibbon
- Lawrie Miller
- Frank Mooney
- Guy Overton
- Matt Poore
- John Reid

The manager was the former Test batsman Jack Kerr. The four players who had not yet played Test cricket – Beck, Bell, Ian Leggat and Overton – all played their first Tests on the tour. Beck, who was aged 19, had not played a first-class match before the start of the tour. He was selected for the tour "on the basis of his schoolboy form and his raw promise" and made his first-class debut in the second match of the tour. His Test debut came in the second Test after he had played only five first-class matches.

== Tour itinerary ==
The tour took place between October 1953 and March 1954, with the New Zealanders in South Africa until mid-February. The team left New Zealand on the Arawa on 1 October, arriving in Cape Town on 28 October after visiting Port Melbourne and Fremantle in Australia.

A total of 17 matches were played in South Africa during the tour, 16 of which were first-class. Seven matches were played before the first Test match, including one in Rhodesia. (Note: In 1953 Southern Rhodesia was a self-governing British Crown colony. The colony's government issued a Unilateral Declaration of Independence in 1965, establishing the unrecognised state of Rhodesia which existed until the formation of Zimbabwe in 1980. The Rhodesia cricket team first played in the Currie Cup, the South African first-class cricket competition, in 1904–05 and played regularly in the competition from 1946–47 until becoming Zimbabwe in 1980. Zimbabwean teams continued to play in South African domestic competitions occasionally in the mid-1990s and in 2007–08. Rhodesia did not play Test cricket and were not considered an full international team before the formation of Zimbabwe, but international teams touring South Africa, including England and Australian teams, occasionally played matches against the Rhodesian team.) A single match took place between the first and second Tests and three further first-class matches were played between the third and fourth Tests; Rabone was injured during the final first-class match against Border, immediately before the fourth Test was played.

Three first-class matches were played in Australia during March on the return leg of the tour, and the touring team played a match against a New Zealand XI on their return to their home country.

== Test series ==
All of the Test matches during the tour were four-day matches (Note: The duration of Test matches has varied throughout the history of Test cricket. Although most modern matches are scheduled to be played over five days, historically Test matches have been played over three, four or six days as well. Timeless Tests, matches played to their conclusion without a time limit, have also been played, mainly in Australia during the period before the Second World War.) and used 8-ball overs. (Note: 8-ball overs were used in South Africa between 1937–38 and 1957–58, in Australia between 1918–19 and 1978–79, in New Zealand at various points between 1918–19 and 1978–79, and briefly in both Britain, North America, the West Indies and India. All of the matches during the tour, with the exception of the match against the New Zealand XI played in March, used eight balls to an over.) South Africa won four of the five Test matches, although the New Zealanders were in strong positions in two of these matches. The third Test was a draw.

=== First Test ===
The first Test match of the series was played at Kingsmead Cricket Ground in Durban, beginning on 11 December 1953. South Africa's Neil Adcock and New Zealand's Guy Overton made their Test match debuts.

South Africa gained a "great advantage" by winning the toss and chose to bat on a wicket which Wisden said "became more difficult as the match progressed". They scored 437 runs before declaring their innings complete after 115 overs. An opening century-partnership between Jackie McGlew and John Waite provided a foundation for the innings, with Roy McLean and Ken Funston also adding 135 for the fourth wicket, McLean top-scoring with an innings of 101. In reply, New Zealand finished the second day's play on 70 for the loss of 2 wickets (70/2) with captain Geoff Rabone unbeaten on 40 runs.

After a rest day on 13 December, (Note: It was common for Test matches to include rest days, generally on Sundays, until the 1990s.) Rabone completed his first century in Test cricket, scoring 107 in an innings which lasted over six hours, but New Zealand were all out for 230, and were asked to follow on. (Note: In a four-day match the follow on target is 150 runs less than the team batting first made in total. If the team batting second fails to reach this target (287 runs in this case) they can be asked to bat again, thus following on. It is a matter of match tactics whether or not the follow on is enforced.) Off spin bowler Hugh Tayfield took six wickets for the cost of 62 runs (6/62) from his 36 overs, and Wisden reported that both he and leg spinner Clive van Ryneveld, who took three wickets, turned the ball "sharply" and "bowled with sustained accurately". After losing two quick wickets at the end of the third day's play, New Zealand were all out for 149 in their second innings, losing the match by an innings and 58 runs. Rabone, who "again resisted strongly", top-scored with 60 in New Zealand's second innings and batted for 9¾ hours of the 11¼ that New Zealand batted for.

11–15 December 1953	South Africa	v	New Zealand	South Africa won by an innings and 58 runs
Scorecard; Wisden report	437/9 declared (115 overs); RA McLean 101; AR MacGibbon 3/73 (27 overs)		230 (105.6 overs); GO Rabone 107; HJ Tayfield 6/62 (36 overs)	Kingsmead, Durban; Umpires: AN McCabe and BV Malan
Scorecard; Wisden report			149 (following on) (89.1 overs); GO Rabone 68; HJ Tayfield 3/35 (26.1 overs)	Kingsmead, Durban; Umpires: AN McCabe and BV Malan
South Africa won the toss and chose to bat; 13 December was a rest day; NAT Adcock (South Africa) and GWF Overton (New Zealand) made their Test debuts.

=== Second Test ===
The second Test is notable for New Zealander Bob Blair receiving news that his fiancée, Nerissa Love, had been killed in the Tangiwai railway disaster on Boxing Day morning. Blair initially withdrew from the match and an announcement had been made that he would take no further part in the game. In the event, however, he travelled to the ground after having heard on the radio commentary of the match that New Zealand were in danger of having to follow on in their first innings. He came in to bat at the fall of the ninth wicket to join Bert Sutcliffe, who had already started to walk off the field having not known that Blair was at the ground. The packed crowd stood in silence.

The pair added 33 runs for the last wicket in 10 minutes, with Sutcliffe hitting Hugh Tayfield for three sixes and Blair hitting one in a single eight-ball over. In Tayfield's next over Blair was stumped, leaving New Zealand almost 100 runs behind after the first innings. After bowling South Africa out for 148 they needed 212 runs to win the match and were 75/3 on the last morning of the match before a batting collapse―the last seven wickets were lost for just 25 more runs― meant that South Africa won the match by 132 runs.

24–29 December 1953	South Africa	v	New Zealand	South Africa won by 132 runs
Scorecard; Wisden report	271 (80 overs); WR Endean 93; AR MacGibbon 3/61 (22 overs)		187 (53.2 overs); B Sutcliffe 80; DEJ Ironside 5/51 (19 overs)	Ellis Park, Johannesburg; Umpires: CD Coote and DT Drew
Scorecard; Wisden report	148 (53.1 overs); RA McLean 36; JR Reid 4/34 (16 overs)		100 (47.5 overs); GO Rabone 22; ME Chapple 22; NAT Adcock 5/43 (19 overs)	Ellis Park, Johannesburg; Umpires: CD Coote and DT Drew
South Africa won the toss and chose to bat; 25 and 27 December were rest days; DEJ Ironside (South Africa) and JEF Beck (New Zealand) made their Test debuts.

=== Third Test ===
The third Test was played at Newlands in Cape Town starting on New Year's Day. South African Dick Westcott and New Zealanders Bill Bell and Ian Leggat made their Test debuts. Bob Blair did not play in the match, although he remained in South Africa due to the time it would have taken to return to New Zealand meaning it was impossible to return home for his fiancée's funeral.

The match was New Zealand's best performance of the tour. After winning the toss and choosing to bat on a pitch that Wisden described as "favourable to batsmen" throughout the match, they scored 505 runs in their first innings, setting a new record for the highest Test match score by a New Zealand team. John Reid scored 135 and was part of a partnership of 174 runs for the fifth wicket with John Beck, setting a new record partnership for New Zealand against South Africa. (Note: Earlier in the innings the New Zealand opening pair Geoff Rabone and Murray Chapple had themselves established a new partnership record for any wicket for New Zealand against South Africa, putting on 126 runs for the first wicket.) The pair batted aggressively on the second day, Reid hitting 20 boundaries. Beck was run out for 99 runs, his highest score in Test cricket.

In reply, South Africa scored 326 runs, including a ninth wicket stand of 95 between Jack Cheetham and Hugh Tayfield. An innings of over four hours from Jackie McGlew, who scored 86 runs, had, however, taken time out of the game. (Note: A team can take time out of the game by batting slowly and defensively―Wisden described McGlew's innings as being of "stern defence". By batting out the time remaining a team is able to draw a match.) They were asked to follow on, but were able to bat out the remaining time to force a draw, scoring 159/3.

1–5 January 1954	New Zealand	v	South Africa	Drawn
Scorecard; Wisden report	505 (165.3 overs); JR Reid 135; DEJ Ironside 4/117 (46.3 overs)		326 (127.7 overs); JE Cheetham 89; GO Rabone 6/68 (38.7 overs)	Newlands, Cape Town; Umpires: DV Collins and S Collins
Scorecard; Wisden report			159/3 (following on) (54 overs); RJ Westcott 62; GO Rabone 1/16 (10 overs)	Newlands, Cape Town; Umpires: DV Collins and S Collins
New Zealand won the toss and chose to bat; 3 January was a rest day; RJ Westcott (South Africa), W Bell and IB Leggat (both New Zealand) made their Test debuts

=== Fourth Test ===
Geoff Rabone broke his foot in the lead up to the fourth Test and was unable to play again on the tour. He was replaced as captain by Bert Sutcliffe who won the toss and put South Africa in to bat.

The match was one-sided, with South Africa winning a "surprisingly comfortable victory" and securing their first home series win against any opposition since 1930. A damp pitch should have favoured New Zealand's bowlers, but the South African opening pair of McGlew and Westcott added 104 for the first wicket. A batting collapse followed, with Guy Overton taking three wickets for just one run in 13 balls to reduce the South Africans to 139/6 at one point. Cheetham and Waite, batting down the order with Westcott promoted to open the batting, added important runs, Waite scoring a half-century batting at number eight, and the team made a total of 243 runs.

The New Zealanders came in to bat on day two and were bowled out for 79. Tayfield took six wickets, including five in a spell of 32 balls without conceding a run, and only three batsmen reached double figures, with five, including Sutcliffe and Reid, recording ducks. Wisden reported that the pitch was not particularly favourable to spin bowling but that "much of the batting was extremely poor". They were asked to follow on, and a combination of rain and bad light meant that they survived into the fourth day despite a hostile opening bowling spell by Neil Adcock. South Africa quickly made the 25runs they needed for victory, winning by nine wickets.

29 January–2 February 1954	South Africa	v	New Zealand	South Africa won by 9 wickets
Scorecard; Wisden report	243 (98 overs); DJ McGlew 61; RW Blair 3/42 (19 overs)		79 (46.3 overs); FLH Mooney 23; HJ Tayfield 6/13 (14 overs)	Ellis Park, Johannesburg; Umpires: DT Drew and BV Malan
Scorecard; Wisden report	25/1 (6.2 overs); JE Cheetham 16*; AR MacGibbon 1/16 (3 overs)		188 (following on) (92.2 overs); EW Dempster 47; NAT Adcock 5/45 (26 overs)	Ellis Park, Johannesburg; Umpires: DT Drew and BV Malan
New Zealand won the toss and chose to field; 31 January was a rest day

=== Fifth Test ===
New Zealand won the toss for the third match in succession at St George's Park in Port Elizabeth, but, after closing to bat, were unable to take advantage of a slow pitch which favoured the batsmen. They scored 226, according to Wisden "[throwing] away a good opportunity of at last winning a Test Match". A combination of batting which "lacked enterprise" and effective bowling and fielding by South Africa limited the New Zealand score, and, after bowling South Africa out for 237, they were unable to score enough runs to put pressure on South Africa, despite half-centuries from Reid and Sutcliffe.

After bowling New Zealand out in their second innings for 222, South Africa had under four hours to score 212 runs to win the match. They did so in just over three hours, with Russell Endean and John Watkins both receiving praise from Wisden for "hitting freely" as they won the match by five wickets.

5–9 February 1954	New Zealand	v	South Africa	South Africa won by 5 wickets
Scorecard; Wisden report	226 (92.3 overs); JEF Beck 48; JC Watkins 4/34 (16 overs)		237 (98.1 overs); JE Cheetham 42; JR Reid 4/51 (32 overs)	St George's Park, Port Elizabeth; Umpires: DV Collins and FRW Payne
Scorecard; Wisden report	222 (87.6 overs); JR Reid 73; CB van Ryneveld 4/67 (20.6 overs)		215/5 (47.3 overs); WR Endean 87; AR MacGibbon 2/44 (10 overs)	St George's Park, Port Elizabeth; Umpires: DV Collins and FRW Payne
New Zealand won the toss chose to bat; 7 February was a rest day
