= South African cricket team in New Zealand in 1952–53 =

International cricket tour

The South Africa national cricket team toured New Zealand in March 1953 and played a two-match Test series against the New Zealand national cricket team. South Africa won the series 1–0 with one match drawn.

== Test series summary ==
=== First Test ===
6–10 March 1953
Scorecard

South Africa	v	New Zealand
524/8d (174 overs); DJ McGlew 255*; RW Blair 4/98 (36 overs)		172 (123.4 overs); B Sutcliffe 62; ERH Fuller 3/29 (19.4 overs)
		172 (f/o) (118.5 overs); JG Leggat 47; JC Watkins 4/22 (23.5 overs)

South Africa won by an innings and 180 runs
Basin Reserve, Wellington
Umpires: RG Currie and JM McLellan

- South Africa won the toss and elected to bat.
- 8 March was taken as a rest day
- FE Fisher, EM Meuli, LSM Miller and RW Blair (all NZ) made their Test debuts.

=== Second Test ===
13–17 March 1953
Scorecard

South Africa	v	New Zealand
377 (162 overs); WR Endean 116; GO Rabone 3/62 (24 overs)		245 (171.2 overs); B Sutcliffe 45; MB Poore 45; HJ Tayfield 5/62 (46.2 overs)
200/5d (78 overs); DJ McGlew 50; MB Poore 2/43 (8 overs)		31/2 (19.3 overs); B Sutcliffe 10; JC Watkins 1/12 (8 overs)

Match drawn
Eden Park, Auckland
Umpires: JC Harris and TM Pearce

- South Africa won the toss and elected to bat.
- 15 March was taken as a rest day
- ME Chapple, MB Poore and EW Dempster (all NZ) made their Test debuts.
