= Les Watt =

New Zealand cricketer (1924–1996)

- Watt in 1950

Personal information
- Full name: Leslie Watt (Note: Watt was often given the middle initial A during his playing career and would be listed on scorecards as LA Watt. He did not have a middle name.)
- Born: 17 September 1924; Waitati, Otago, New Zealand
- Died: 15 November 1996 (aged 72); Dunedin, Otago, New Zealand
- Batting: Right-handed

International information
- National side: New Zealand (1955)
- Only Test (cap 70): 11 March 1955 v England

Domestic team information
- Years: Team
- 1943/44–1962/63: Otago

Career statistics
Competition	Test	First-class
Matches	1	48
Runs scored	2	2,004
Batting average	1.00	23.30
100s/50s	0/0	0/10
Top score	2	96
Catches/stumpings	0/0	14/–
- Source: CricInfo, 1 April 2017

Leslie Watt (17 September 1924 – 15 November 1996) was a New Zealand cricketer who played one Test match for the New Zealand national team, against England in March 1955. He was born at Waitati in Otago in 1924.

Watt made his first-class cricket debut for a South Island Army side in a wartime match against a North Army Army team at the Basin Reserve in Wellington in February 1943. After being dismissed for a duck in his first innings he scored 11 runs in his second. He had played for Otago earlier during the season in non-first-class matches, and played first-class matches for the provincial side between the 1943–44 and 1962–63 seasons, making 45 appearances for the team in top-level matches and winning three Plunket Shields with the side. He was not selected after 1955–56 season until he returned to the side in 1962–63, playing in five Shield matches at the age of 38. In club cricket he played for Kaikorai Cricket Club and was considered one of Otago's most promising batsmen during the post-war period.

A batsman described as "defensive" and who brought "solidity" to the batting order, Watt often opening the batting for Otago with Bert Sutcliffe. His highest first-class score of 96 runs was made against Auckland in 1950–51, when he and Sutcliffe―who made 275―batted throughout the first day to put on 373 for the first wicket. Watt was out to the final delivery of the day, but the partnership set a new record for the first-wicket in New Zealand. The record stood until after Watt's death and, as of 2024, remains an Otago record partnership for any wicket.

Later during the 1950–51 season the pair put on 178 for the first wicket against Central Districts, with Watt scoring 65. Otago won the Plunket Shield, Sutcliffe scoring 610 runs and Watt 326 at a batting average of 46.57 runs per innings, including a score of 94 against Wellington. It was his most productive season and he was twelfth man in New Zealand's two Test matches against England at the end of the season.

In 1954–55, usually batting at number six for Otago, Watt came third in the Plunket Shield averages with 237 runs at 47.40, and made 37 not out in a trial match for South Island against North Island. He was selected for the First Test at Dunedin against the touring English side, making his Test debut with Noel McGregor and Ian Colquhoun. Batting at number six, he was bowled twice, for 0 and 2. He was replaced in the Second Test team by Matt Poore; New Zealand suffered a heavy defeat after being bowled out for 26 runs in their second innings, the lowest score in Test cricket.

Professionally, Watt worked as a carton maker. He died from cancer at Dunedin in 1996 at the age of 72. Obituaries were published in the following year's New Zealand Cricket Almanack and Wisden Cricketer's Almanack. His daughter, Diana Watt, played 13 first-class matches for the Otago women's cricket team during the 1960s.

== See also ==
- One-Test wonder
