= New Zealand cricket team in England in 1949 =

International cricket tour

The New Zealand cricket team toured England in the 1949 season. The team was the fourth official touring side from New Zealand, following those in 1927, 1931 and 1937, and was by some distance the most successful to this date. The four-match Test series with England was shared, every game ending as a draw, and of 35 first-class fixtures, 14 were won, 20 drawn and only one lost.

== Background ==
New Zealand had had very limited Test cricket in recent years. The last full tour of England had been in 1937, and since the Second World War there had been only two single matches, one against Australia in 1945-46 and the other the following season against the touring MCC team led by Wally Hammond. Consequently, many of the New Zealand players were untested at the highest level of the game.

By contrast, England had played full series both at home and abroad in every summer and winter since the end of the war, though with mixed results. The team had been comprehensively outplayed twice by Australia, and though other results against India, South Africa and West Indies had been better, there had been considerable experimentation with new players, and only a handful of players could consider themselves certainties for selection were England to choose to field its strongest side.

== The New Zealand team ==
The side consisted of 15 players and was led by Walter Hadlee, who was one of four players – the others were Merv Wallace, Martin Donnelly and Jack Cowie – who had toured with the 1937 team.

The side was:

- Walter Hadlee (captain)
- Merv Wallace (vice-captain)
- Cecil Burke
- Tom Burtt
- Harry Cave
- Jack Cowie
- Fen Cresswell
- Martin Donnelly
- Johnny Hayes
- Frank Mooney (wicketkeeper)
- Geoff Rabone
- John Reid
- Verdun Scott
- Brun Smith
- Bert Sutcliffe

Jack Phillipps, the tour manager, played in one minor match against Durham (not then first-class). Reid, a lively fast bowler as well as a batsman, was used as the second wicketkeeper and had to deputise in the fourth Test for Mooney, who was unfit. Of the 15 players, 13 appeared in the Test matches. The exceptions were Burke, who had played his only Test match in the game against Australia in 1945–46, and Hayes, who was injured for much of this tour but became a regular player for New Zealand across much of the 1950s, touring England again in 1958. Cave, Reid and Sutcliffe also toured with the 1958 side.

== Test series ==
The four Test matches were allocated only three days each. After the first two matches ended in draws, the New Zealanders were asked if they would add an extra day to each of the last two matches. After consulting with their domestic cricket board, the tourists turned the idea down, arguing that this would have disrupted their commitments to county matches.

=== 1st Test ===
New Zealand, with only four front-line bowlers, were able to contain England's batsmen but struggled to dismiss them. Centuries by Len Hutton and Denis Compton ensured a large score, but England made only 307 runs on the first day, Cowie taking five wickets, and Burtt mopped up the tail on the Monday morning to claim five also. Trevor Bailey, in his first Test, troubled the early batsmen with his pace, and the fourth wicket was down at 80. But Donnelly and Smith put on 120 and Smith went on to score 96. A last-wicket partnership between Mooney and Cowie put on 57 and went into the last morning, but Cowie was injured and could not bowl in England's second innings. Fast scoring by Bill Edrich and George Mann, and less fast by an injured Cyril Washbrook, who scored 103, led to a declaration. But 299 to win in 150 minutes was too much to ask and Sutcliffe, Scott and Smith got batting practice as the game petered out.

11,13,14 June 1949
Scorecard

England	v	New Zealand
372 all out (127.3 overs); Denis Compton 114; Tom Burtt 5/97 (39.3 overs)		341 all out (118.3 overs); Brun Smith 96; Trevor Bailey 6/118 (32.3 overs)
267/4 declared (68 overs); Cyril Washbrook 103*; Harry Cave 3/103 (26 overs)		195/2 (49 overs); Bert Sutcliffe 82; Jack Young 2/41 (14 overs)

Match Drawn
Headingley, Leeds
Umpires: Bill Ashdown (ENG) and Dai Davies (ENG)

- England won the toss and chose to bat

=== 2nd Test ===
England lost five wickets for 112, but the pitch got easier and Compton (116) and Bailey (93) put on 189 for the sixth wicket. England's declaration, with 20 minutes of the first day's play still to go, was technically incorrect, but New Zealand did not object. New Zealand opened with 89 from Sutcliffe and Scott, and then Donnelly, making 206 out of 347, the highest score for New Zealand at this point, took the game out of England's reach. Hutton and Jack Robertson opened with a stand of 143 to almost clear the arrears, and Robertson went on to score 121.

25,27,28 June 1949
Scorecard

England	v	New Zealand
313/9 declared (103.1 overs); Denis Compton 116; Tom Burtt 4/102 (35 overs)		484 all out (159.4 overs); Martin Donnelly 206; Eric Hollies 5/133 (58 overs)
306/5 (68 overs); Jack Robertson 121; Geoff Rabone 3/116 (28 overs)

Match Drawn
Lord's, London
Umpires: Bill Ashdown (ENG) and Frank Chester (ENG)

- England won the toss and chose to bat

=== 3rd Test ===
New England captain Freddie Brown put New Zealand in to bat, and Bailey took early wickets in humid conditions. There was also a debut wicket for 18-year-old Brian Close. But Donnelly, with 75, and Reid (50) added 116, and the innings went into the second day. Bailey finished with six for 84. England found it difficult to force the pace against tight bowling and fielding. All the top seven batsmen made runs, with Hutton making 73 and Edrich 78, and Reg Simpson took advantage of a tiring attack to score his first Test century, with 103. Bailey was 72 not out when Brown declared. At 109 for three, New Zealand were vulnerable, but 101 from Sutcliffe and 80 from Donnelly saw them save the match comfortably.

23,25,26 July 1949
Scorecard

New Zealand	v	England
293 all out (128.2 overs); Martin Donnelly 75; Trevor Bailey 6/84 (30.2 overs)		440/9 declared (128 overs); Reg Simpson 103; Tom Burtt 6/162 (45 overs)
348/7 (110 overs); Bert Sutcliffe 101; Eric Hollies 2/52 (26 overs)

Match Drawn
Old Trafford, Manchester
Umpires: Frank Chester (ENG) and Frank Lee (ENG)

- England won the toss and chose to field

=== 4th Test ===
New Zealand, without Mooney, for whom Reid deputised as wicketkeeper, and with Rabone unable to bowl, won the toss for the first time in the series and batted. Sutcliffe and Scott put on 121 for the first wicket, and Wallace passed 50 as well, but the later batsmen were more defensive. The innings lasted into the second day, and then Hutton and Simpson put on 147, and Hutton and Edrich followed up with a second wicket stand of 218 before Hutton was out for 206. Edrich went on to exactly 100, but from 365 for one the innings subsided. Cresswell took six for 168 with inswingers and leg cutters. Though Sutcliffe made 54, four New Zealand wickets went before the arrears were cleared, but Reid, who made 93, and Wallace, with his second 50 of the match, stood firm and the match was saved.

13,15,16 August 1949
Scorecard

New Zealand	v	England
345 all out (112.1 overs); Bert Sutcliffe 88; Alec Bedser 4/74 (31 overs)		482 (117.2 overs); Len Hutton 206; Fen Cresswell 6/168 (41.2 overs)
308/9 declared (97 overs); John R. Reid 93; Jim Laker 4/78 (29 overs)

Match Drawn
The Oval, London
Umpires: Dai Davies (ENG) and Frank Lee (ENG)

- New Zealand won the toss and chose to bat

== First-class matches ==
In 32 first-class matches, the New Zealand tourists won 13 times and lost only once, when they were caught on a drying pitch at Oxford without Cowie, their player best able to exploit such conditions. The team's success was built on the weight of runs that its batsmen provided, and the bowling figures, Burtt apart, were modest.

After a draw against Yorkshire in which both Wallace and Len Hutton scored centuries, New Zealand reeled off victories against Worcestershire and Surrey, and Wallace made it four centuries in five matches in the drawn match with Leicestershire and the victory over Cambridge University.

The MCC match, one of the set-pieces of the cricket calendar, saw a slow draw with New Zealand rescued by a seventh wicket partnership of 176 by Mooney and Rabone. Then came the defeat by Oxford University in a low-scoring match, but the threat of a repeat in the following fixture, against Sussex, when New Zealand trailed by 116 on the first innings, disappeared through good bowling by Cowie and good batting by Reid, Sutcliffe and Donnelly in a successful run-chase. Drawn matches with Somerset and Glamorgan led up to the first Test.

Weakness in bowling showed in the two first-class matches between the first two Tests. In the first game, Hampshire were dismissed for 129 and then centuries for Scott and Donnelly gave the New Zealanders a first innings lead of 301 before a declaration with only five wickets down. But Hampshire recovered to set the tourists 109 to win in just 35 minutes, a target that was achieved with five minutes to spare. Against Surrey, a New Zealand first innings of 465, of which Sutcliffe made 187, the county replied with 645 for nine declared, and Jack Parker scored 255.

The second Test was followed by an easy victory over the Combined Services, and then came 11 wickets for Burtt in the victory over Gloucestershire, a match in which the county's spin bowling pair of Tom Goddard and Sam Cook bowled unchanged through the 90 overs of the New Zealand first innings. Lancashire made the touring team follow on for the first time in the season, but New Zealand salvaged a draw, and then the match with Derbyshire followed the Hampshire pattern, with a big first-innings lead whittled down by a second-innings recovery for the county, leaving the tourists with a successful run-chase to win. Northamptonshire eked a draw out of a high-scoring match, but New Zealand dominated the game in Glasgow against Scotland and Cowie's six second-innings wickets were clean bowled.

After the third Test, the return match with Yorkshire was very tight, with the county left to score 169 in 100 minutes and hanging on 61 short with the last available batsmen together when time ran out. The second match with Glamorgan was badly affected by rain with the New Zealanders in a commanding position, thanks to a big century by Wallace and six wickets for Cresswell. Games with Warwickshire, Nottinghamshire and Essex all ended in batsman-dominated draws. In the Essex game, Sutcliffe scored 243 in the first innings and an unbeaten 100 in the second innings, the first time a New Zealander had scored two hundreds in a match outside New Zealand.

The final Test was followed by a two-day match with Durham, and then the New Zealanders won the return match with Lancashire by scoring 153 to win in 75 minutes. Kent scraped a draw after Hadlee did not enforce the follow-on, and joint county champions Middlesex batted very unevenly, and lost by nine wickets as Sutcliffe scored 110 out of 157 in 95 minutes. The end-of-season festival matches saw a South of England side beaten by an innings and at Scarborough a H. D. G. Leveson Gower's XI side composed entirely of Test players lost by six wickets, though the New Zealanders were helped by generous declarations.

== Leading players ==
The batsmen were the big successes of the New Zealand side and Donnelly and Sutcliffe finished fifth and eighth in the English first-class averages for the season. In first-class matches, Donnelly scored 2287 runs at an average of 61.81 and Sutcliffe scored 2627 runs at 59.70. Sutcliffe led by seven to five in centuries, and Scott and Wallace also scored five centuries each. Six other batsmen apart from the leading pair passed 1,000 runs for the season, and Wallace, Reid and Scott all averaged more than 40. In the Tests, Smith, who played in only two matches, headed the averages, but again the aggregates were dominated by Donnelly and Sutcliffe, each scoring more than 400 runs when no other batsman managed 200.

The bowling was less successful. In a hot and dry summer, Burtt bowled almost twice as many overs as anyone else on the touring side, and took 128 wickets at an average of 22.88. No other bowler managed more than the 62 of Cresswell, though Wisden reckoned Cowie, whose 59 wickets cost 27 runs each, was the only really menacing bowler in the side. Burtt and Cowie were the only successes at Test level, and in both cases their average runs per wicket was over 30.

== Verdict and aftermath ==
The tour was counted as a success, and the New Zealanders won praise for their batting. The side scored more runs in first-class matches than Donald Bradman's 1948 Australian tourists, the so-called Invincibles. The power of the batting left the England cricket team no nearer finding a settled line-up for its bowlers, and the big bonus from England's perspective was the emergence of Trevor Bailey as a genuine Test-class all-rounder.

New Zealand's lack of international fixtures before the 1949 series was not repeated and the nucleus of the side remained in place for matches through to 1952 against West Indies and South Africa, as well as for the MCC visit in 1950–51. But Cowie retired after the 1949 series and a thin bowling attack was rendered even thinner by his departure.

One consequence of the domination of bat over ball in the 1949 series was that, from 1950 onwards, Test matches in England were lengthened to five days against all opponents.
