= Guy Overton =

New Zealand cricketer

- Overton in 1953

Personal information
- Full name: Guy William Fitzroy Overton
- Born: 8 June 1919; Dunedin, New Zealand
- Died: 7 September 1993 (aged 74); Winton, Southland, New Zealand
- Batting: Left-handed
- Bowling: Right-arm fast-medium

International information
- National side: New Zealand (1953–1954)
- Test debut (cap 64): 11 December 1953 v South Africa
- Last Test: 29 January 1954 v South Africa

Domestic team information
- Years: Team
- 1945/46–1955/56: Otago

Career statistics
Competition	Test	First-class
Matches	3	51
Runs scored	8	137
Batting average	1.60	4.15
100s/50s	0/0	0/0
Top score	3*	17*
Balls bowled	729	11,054
Wickets	9	169
Bowling average	28.66	25.14
5 wickets in innings	0	6
10 wickets in match	0	0
Best bowling	3/65	7/52
Catches/stumpings	1/–	21/–
- Source: Cricinfo, 1 April 2017

Guy William Fitzroy Overton (8 June 1919 – 7 September 1993) was a New Zealand international cricketer who played three Test matches in 1953–54. In domestic cricket he represented Otago from 1945–46 to 1955–56.

== Early career ==
A sheep farmer in Southland, Overton played a number of games for Southland in the 1940s as a right-arm opening bowler before making his first-class debut for Otago. In 1944–45 he took 8 for 24 and 3 for 10 in a drawn two-day match against Otago. In 1945–46, after taking 4 for 28 and 6 for 13 for Southland against Otago, and 4 for 12 and 2 for 13 against North Otago, he played for Otago against the touring Australians, taking 3 for 86 in the first innings, including Lindsay Hassett as his first first-class victim.

He established himself in the Otago side in 1946–47. In his first Plunket Shield match, against Canterbury, he took a hat-trick. In 1949–50 he took five or six wickets in the first innings of each of the three Plunket Shield matches and was the leading wicket-taker in the competition with 17 at 19.00. In 1952–53 he took 19 wickets at 18.52 in the Plunket Shield, and was selected to tour South Africa the following season.

== Later career ==
Overton played in the First, Second and Fourth Tests in South Africa, taking nine wickets. At one stage in the first innings of the Fourth Test, "Overton, swinging the ball either way, took three wickets for one run in thirteen balls" to leave South Africa 125 for 5. When the New Zealanders played three matches in Australia on the way home, Overton took 7 for 52 in Western Australia's second innings, including the first three wickets in nine balls. He took coloured film of the tour, which was later screened publicly to cricket audiences.

He played the 1954–55 season, in which he took 7 for 88 against Central Districts, and retired after two games in 1955–56.

Overton's tally of wickets exceeded his tally of runs, but he twice batted long enough at number 11 to give Otago victory by one wicket: against Wellington in 1948–49, when he and Noel McGregor put on 37 for the last wicket (Overton 8 not out) and against Wellington again in 1952–53, when he and Alan Gilbertson put on 25 (Overton 5 not out). His highest score was 17 not out in 1954–55, against Wellington once again, when he and Les Watt took the Otago score from 139 for 9 to 205 all out.

== Acclaim ==
Dick Brittenden wrote, "No one in New Zealand cricket was more highly-regarded than Overton: no player can recall ever hearing a word said against him by anyone." After he retired from playing he became an umpire.
