= David Drew =

David Drew may refer to:

- David Drew (politician) (born 1952), British politician and member of Parliament, current vice chairman of Forest Green Rovers
- David Drew (dancer) (1938–2015), English ballet dancer and member of the Royal Ballet
- David Drew (paediatrician), English paediatrician
- David Drew (music critic) (1930–2009), British musicologist and editor
- David Drew (umpire) (1919–1976), South African cricket umpire

== See also ==
- J. D. Drew (David Jonathan Drew, born 1975), Major League Baseball player
