= Eric Fisher =

Eric Fisher may refer to:

- Eric Fisher (cricketer) (1924–1996), New Zealand cricketer
- Eric Fisher (American football) (born 1991), American football offensive tackle
