= Geoff Rabone =

New Zealand cricketer (1921–2006)

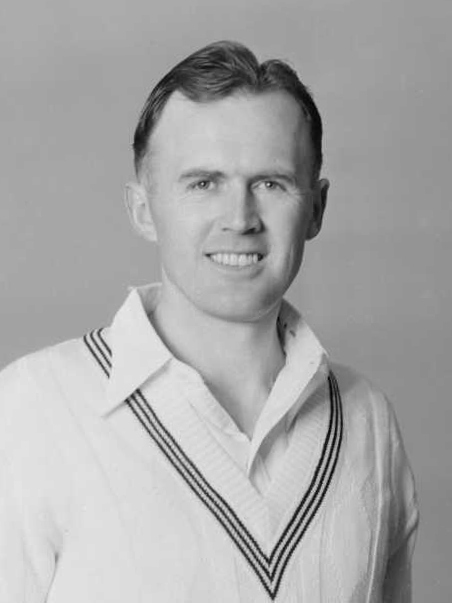
- Rabone in 1953

Personal information
- Full name: Geoffrey Osborne Rabone
- Born: 6 November 1921; Gore, Southland, New Zealand
- Died: 19 January 2006 (aged 84); Auckland, New Zealand
- Nickname: Bones, Bonsie
- Batting: Right-handed
- Bowling: Right-arm offbreak, Legbreak

International information
- National side: New Zealand (1949–1955)
- Test debut (cap 48): 11 June 1949 v England
- Last Test: 25 March 1955 v England

Career statistics
Competition	Test	First-class
Matches	12	82
Runs scored	562	3,425
Batting average	31.22	28.30
100s/50s	1/2	3/19
Top score	107	125
Balls bowled	1,385	11,190
Wickets	16	173
Bowling average	39.68	27.94
5 wickets in innings	1	9
10 wickets in match	0	0
Best bowling	6/68	8/66
Catches/stumpings	5/–	76/–
- Source: Cricinfo, 1 April 2017

Geoffrey Osborne Rabone (6 November 1921 – 19 January 2006), known as Geoff Rabone, was a cricketer who captained New Zealand in five Test matches in 1953–54 and 1954–55. He represented New Zealand in 12 Test matches between 1949 and the 1954–55 seasons and he was the South African Cricketer of the Year in 1954.

== Cricket career ==
Geoff Rabone played for Wellington from 1940–41 to 1950–51 and for Auckland from 1951–52 to 1959–60 as a dour right-handed batsman and as a right-arm off-break bowler who bowled the occasional leg-break too.

After Second World War service as a Lancaster bomber pilot, Rabone had played only six first-class matches before being selected for 1949 New Zealand touring side to England. In a team of strokemakers headed by Martin Donnelly and Bert Sutcliffe, Rabone's normal batting style gave solidity to New Zealand's middle order. He played in all four Tests of the summer, making 148 runs but with a highest score of just 39.

His maiden century made an unbeaten 120 against Nottinghamshire, opening the innings and batting for 340 minutes in a total of 329 for four declared. On the tour as a whole, he made 1,021 runs at an average of 32.93. His bowling proved expensive in English conditions, and he took 50 wickets, but at an average of 35.70. In the Tests, he took only four wickets.

In his next Test series, when the West Indies visited New Zealand in 1951–52, Rabone continued to be used primarily as a defensive batsman, taking 178 minutes to score 37 as an opener, and then 83 minutes to score just nine in the middle order. And the following year, playing just one match when South Africa toured New Zealand, he took 215 minutes to score 29.

In 1953–54, New Zealand made its first Test-playing tour to a country other than England, a five-Test series in South Africa. Rabone was picked as captain, and though the side was unsuccessful in the big matches – the Test series was lost 4–0 – his own reputation for dependability and durability was enhanced. In the first Test, he made 107 out of a total of 230 in more than six hours, and followed that with 68 out of 149 in the second innings. In all, he batted for 585 out of the 675 minutes that his side's two innings lasted. That match was lost by an innings; the second, in which Rabone had little success, was lost by 132 runs.

But the third game, which ended as a draw, saw New Zealand's then-highest Test score, 505, and the first time the team had managed to enforce the follow-on. Rabone scored 56 and then took six for 68 as South Africa were bowled out for 326, his best Test bowling. The tour ended in an anticlimax for Rabone, though, as he broke a bone in a foot during a provincial match and could not take part in the last two Tests.

Rabone was restored to the New Zealand captaincy the following year for the 1954–55 MCC tour of New Zealand. The results in the two Tests were poor and there was criticism of his captaincy, but Rabone's own adhesive qualities seemed undiminished. In the first innings of the first match, he was one of only two players – the other was Sutcliffe – to reach double figures, taking three hours to score 18. And in the second, when New Zealand were dismissed for the record Test low of 26, he was again second highest scorer and longest survivor, with 7 in 53 minutes. Both matches, though, were lost by a distance.

That was the end of his Test cricket, though he played for Auckland for a few more seasons. In retirement, he was a New Zealand selector. He had a successful career with Shell Oil New Zealand.

== Citations ==
Sporting positions
Preceded by Merv Wallace	New Zealand national cricket captain 1953/4-1954/5	Succeeded by Harry Cave
