= Ces Burke =

New Zealand cricketer (1914–1997)

Personal information
- Full name: Cecil Burke
- Born: 27 March 1914; Ellerslie, Auckland, New Zealand
- Died: 4 August 1997 (aged 83); Auckland, New Zealand
- Nickname: Burglar
- Batting: Right-handed
- Bowling: Legbreak googly

International information
- National side: New Zealand (1946)
- Only Test (cap 35): 29 March 1946 v Australia

Domestic team information
- Years: Team
- 1937/38–1953/54: Auckland

Career statistics
Competition	Test	First-class
Matches	1	60
Runs scored	4	959
Batting average	2.00	17.43
100s/50s	0/0	0/2
Top score	3	51*
Balls bowled	66	12757
Wickets	2	200
Bowling average	15.00	25.99
5 wickets in innings	0	7
10 wickets in match	0	1
Best bowling	2/30	6/23
Catches/stumpings	0/–	31/–
- Source: Cricinfo, 1 April 2017

Cecil Burke (27 March 1914 – 4 August 1997) was a New Zealand cricketer who played for Auckland from 1938 to 1954 and, once, for New Zealand.

== Cricket career ==
The New Zealand Test team, Christchurch, March 1947. Ces Burke, who was 12th man, is at top left.

Burke was born in the Auckland suburb of Ellerslie. He was a civil servant by occupation.

A lower-order right-handed batsman and a leg-break and googly bowler, variously known as "Cec" or "Ces", Burke made his first-class debut for Auckland in 1937–38 and then played regularly for the team up to the 1953–54 season. He was picked as a specialist bowler for the single Test match played in 1945–46 between New Zealand and Australia, which was won comprehensively by the Australians, New Zealand failing to total 100 runs in their two innings combined. Burke took two Australian wickets – Bill Brown and Keith Miller.

Burke was twelfth man for the single Test match of the following season, 1946–47, when MCC toured Australia and New Zealand, and he was selected for the tour to England in 1949. He took 54 wickets in 18 games on the tour at an average of 29.83, including 6 for 23 against Derbyshire, but scored just 171 runs. During the tour he injured his hand and as a consequence did not play in any of the Tests. His best figures in the Plunket Shield were 6 for 47 against Central Districts in 1953–54.
