= List of New Zealand Test cricketers =

This is a list of New Zealand Test cricketers. A Test match is an international cricket match between two of the leading cricketing nations. The list is arranged in the order in which each player won his Test cap. Where more than one player won his first Test cap in the same Test match, those players are listed alphabetically by surname.

== Players ==
Statistics are correct as of 29 June 2026.

‡ - Captain

† - Wicket-keeper

| New Zealand Test cricketers | | | | Batting | | | | | Bowling | | | | | | Fielding | |
| Cap | Name | Career | Mat | Inn | NO | Runs | HS | Avg | Balls | Mdn | Runs | Wkt | Best | Avg | Ca | St |
|---|---|---|---|---|---|---|---|---|---|---|---|---|---|---|---|---|
| 1 | Ted Badcock | 1930–1933 | 7 | 9 | 2 | 137 | 64 | 19.57 | 1608 | 66 | 610 | 16 | 4/80 | 38.13 | 1 | - |
| 2 | Roger Blunt | 1930–1932 | 9 | 13 | 1 | 330 | 96 | 27.50 | 936 | 34 | 472 | 12 | 3/17 | 39.33 | 5 | - |
| 3 | Stewie Dempster | 1930–1933 | 10 | 15 | 4 | 723 | 136 | 65.73 | 5 | 0 | 10 | 0 | - | - | 2 | - |
| 4 | George Dickinson | 1930–1932 | 3 | 5 | 0 | 31 | 11 | 6.20 | 451 | 13 | 245 | 8 | 3/66 | 30.63 | 3 | - |
| 5 | Henry Foley | 1930 | 1 | 2 | 0 | 4 | 2 | 2.00 | - | - | - | - | - | - | 0 | - |
| 6 | Matt Henderson | 1930 | 1 | 2 | 1 | 8 | 6 | 8.00 | 90 | 3 | 64 | 2 | 2/38 | 32.00 | 1 | - |
| 7 | Ken James † | 1930–1933 | 11 | 13 | 2 | 52 | 14 | 4.73 | - | - | - | - | - | - | 11 | 5 |
| 8 | Tom Lowry ‡ | 1930–1931 | 7 | 8 | 0 | 223 | 80 | 27.88 | 12 | 1 | 5 | 0 | - | - | 8 | - |
| 9 | Bill Merritt | 1930–1931 | 6 | 8 | 1 | 73 | 19 | 10.43 | 936 | 10 | 617 | 12 | 4/104 | 51.42 | 2 | - |
| 10 | Curly Page ‡ | 1930–1937 | 14 | 20 | 0 | 492 | 104 | 24.60 | 379 | 11 | 231 | 5 | 2/21 | 46.20 | 6 | - |
| 11 | Alby Roberts | 1930–1937 | 5 | 10 | 1 | 248 | 66* | 27.56 | 459 | 19 | 209 | 7 | 4/101 | 29.86 | 4 | - |
| 12 | Eddie McLeod | 1930 | 1 | 2 | 1 | 18 | 16 | 18.00 | 12 | 0 | 5 | 0 | - | - | 0 | - |
| 13 | John Mills | 1930–1933 | 7 | 10 | 1 | 241 | 117 | 26.78 | - | - | - | - | - | - | 1 | - |
| 14 | Lindsay Weir | 1930–1937 | 11 | 16 | 2 | 416 | 74* | 29.71 | 342 | 7 | 209 | 7 | 3/38 | 29.86 | 3 | - |
| 15 | Cyril Allcott | 1930–1932 | 6 | 7 | 2 | 113 | 33 | 22.60 | 1206 | 41 | 541 | 6 | 2/102 | 90.17 | 3 | - |
| 16 | Herb McGirr | 1930 | 2 | 1 | 0 | 51 | 51 | 51.00 | 180 | 5 | 115 | 1 | 1/65 | 115.00 | 0 | - |
| 17 | Mal Matheson | 1930–1931 | 2 | 1 | 0 | 7 | 7 | 7.00 | 282 | 9 | 136 | 2 | 2/7 | 68.00 | 2 | - |
| 18 | Ian Cromb | 1931–1932 | 5 | 8 | 2 | 123 | 51* | 20.50 | 960 | 36 | 442 | 8 | 3/113 | 55.25 | 1 | - |
| 19 | Jack Kerr | 1931–1937 | 7 | 12 | 1 | 212 | 59 | 19.27 | - | - | - | - | - | - | 4 | - |
| 20 | Giff Vivian | 1931–1937 | 7 | 10 | 0 | 421 | 100 | 42.10 | 1311 | 44 | 633 | 17 | 4/58 | 37.24 | 4 | - |
| 21 | Don Cleverley | 1932–1946 | 2 | 4 | 3 | 19 | 10* | 19.00 | 222 | 3 | 130 | 0 | - | - | 0 | - |
| 22 | Jack Newman | 1932–1933 | 3 | 4 | 0 | 33 | 19 | 8.25 | 425 | 11 | 254 | 2 | 2/76 | 127.00 | 0 | - |
| 23 | Doug Freeman | 1933 | 2 | 2 | 0 | 2 | 1 | 1.00 | 240 | 3 | 169 | 1 | 1/91 | 169.00 | 0 | - |
| 24 | Dennis Smith | 1933 | 1 | 1 | 0 | 4 | 4 | 4.00 | 120 | 0 | 113 | 1 | 1/113 | 113.00 | 0 | - |
| 25 | Paul Whitelaw | 1933 | 2 | 4 | 2 | 64 | 30 | 32.00 | - | - | - | - | - | - | 0 | - |
| 26 | Jack Dunning | 1933–1937 | 4 | 6 | 1 | 38 | 19 | 7.60 | 830 | 20 | 493 | 5 | 2/35 | 98.60 | 2 | - |
| 27 | Jack Cowie | 1937–1949 | 9 | 13 | 4 | 90 | 45 | 10.00 | 2028 | 65 | 969 | 45 | 6/40 | 21.53 | 3 | - |
| 28 | Martin Donnelly | 1937–1949 | 7 | 12 | 1 | 582 | 206 | 52.91 | 30 | 0 | 20 | 0 | - | - | 7 | - |
| 29 | Walter Hadlee ‡ | 1937–1951 | 11 | 19 | 1 | 543 | 116 | 30.17 | - | - | - | - | - | - | 6 | - |
| 30 | Sonny Moloney | 1937 | 3 | 6 | 0 | 156 | 64 | 26.00 | 12 | 1 | 9 | 0 | - | - | 3 | - |
| 31 | Eric Tindill † | 1937–1947 | 5 | 9 | 1 | 73 | 37* | 9.13 | - | - | - | - | - | - | 6 | 1 |
| 32 | Merv Wallace ‡ | 1937–1953 | 13 | 21 | 0 | 439 | 66 | 20.90 | 6 | 0 | 5 | 0 | - | - | 5 | - |
| 33 | Norman Gallichan | 1937 | 1 | 2 | 0 | 32 | 30 | 16.00 | 264 | 11 | 113 | 3 | 3/99 | 37.67 | 0 | - |
| 34 | Mac Anderson | 1946 | 1 | 2 | 0 | 5 | 4 | 2.50 | - | - | - | - | - | - | 1 | - |
| 35 | Ces Burke | 1946 | 1 | 2 | 0 | 4 | 3 | 2.00 | 66 | 2 | 30 | 2 | 2/30 | 15.00 | 0 | - |
| 36 | Len Butterfield | 1946 | 1 | 2 | 0 | 0 | 0 | 0.00 | 78 | 6 | 24 | 0 | - | - | 0 | - |
| 37 | Don McRae | 1946 | 1 | 2 | 0 | 8 | 8 | 4.00 | 84 | 3 | 44 | 0 | - | - | 0 | - |
| 38 | Gordon Rowe | 1946 | 1 | 2 | 0 | 0 | 0 | 0.00 | - | - | - | - | - | - | 1 | - |
| 39 | Verdun Scott | 1946–1952 | 10 | 17 | 1 | 458 | 84 | 28.63 | 18 | 0 | 14 | - | - | - | 7 | - |
| 40 | Tom Burtt | 1947–1953 | 10 | 15 | 3 | 252 | 42 | 21.00 | 2593 | 119 | 1170 | 33 | 6/162 | 35.45 | 2 | - |
| 41 | Roy Scott | 1947 | 1 | 1 | 0 | 18 | 18 | 18.00 | 138 | 3 | 74 | 1 | 1/74 | 74.00 | 0 | - |
| 42 | Brun Smith | 1947–1952 | 4 | 6 | 1 | 237 | 96 | 47.40 | - | - | - | - | - | - | 1 | - |
| 43 | Colin Snedden | 1947 | 1 | - | - | - | - | - | 96 | 5 | 46 | 0 | - | - | 0 | - |
| 44 | Bert Sutcliffe ‡ | 1947–1965 | 42 | 76 | 8 | 2727 | 230* | 40.10 | 538 | 10 | 344 | 4 | 2/38 | 86.00 | 20 | - |
| 45 | Don Taylor | 1947–1956 | 3 | 5 | 0 | 159 | 77 | 31.80 | - | - | - | - | - | - | 2 | - |
| 46 | Harry Cave ‡ | 1949–1958 | 19 | 31 | 5 | 229 | 22* | 8.81 | 4074 | 242 | 1467 | 34 | 4/21 | 43.15 | 8 | - |
| 47 | Frank Mooney † | 1949–1954 | 14 | 22 | 2 | 343 | 46 | 17.15 | 8 | 1 | 0 | 0 | - | - | 22 | 8 |
| 48 | Geoff Rabone ‡ | 1949–1955 | 12 | 20 | 2 | 562 | 107 | 31.22 | 1385 | 48 | 635 | 16 | 6/68 | 39.69 | 5 | - |
| 49 | John Reid ‡† | 1949–1965 | 58 | 108 | 5 | 3428 | 142 | 33.28 | 7725 | 444 | 2835 | 85 | 6/60 | 33.35 | 43 | 1 |
| 50 | Fen Cresswell | 1949–1951 | 3 | 5 | 3 | 14 | 12* | 7.00 | 650 | 30 | 292 | 13 | 6/168 | 22.46 | 0 | - |
| 51 | John Hayes | 1951–1958 | 15 | 22 | 7 | 73 | 19 | 4.87 | 2675 | 86 | 1217 | 30 | 4/36 | 40.57 | 3 | - |
| 52 | Tony MacGibbon | 1951–1958 | 26 | 46 | 5 | 814 | 66 | 19.85 | 5659 | 228 | 2160 | 70 | 5/64 | 30.86 | 13 | - |
| 53 | Alex Moir | 1951–1959 | 17 | 30 | 8 | 327 | 41* | 14.86 | 2650 | 82 | 1418 | 28 | 6/155 | 50.64 | 2 | - |
| 54 | Don Beard | 1952–1956 | 4 | 7 | 2 | 101 | 31 | 20.20 | 806 | 37 | 302 | 9 | 3/22 | 33.56 | 2 | - |
| 55 | Ray Emery | 1952 | 2 | 4 | 0 | 46 | 28 | 11.50 | 46 | 0 | 52 | 2 | 2/52 | 26.00 | 0 | - |
| 56 | Gordon Leggat | 1952–1956 | 9 | 18 | 2 | 351 | 61 | 21.94 | - | - | - | - | - | - | 0 | - |
| 57 | Bob Blair | 1953–1964 | 19 | 34 | 6 | 189 | 64* | 6.75 | 3525 | 114 | 1515 | 43 | 4/85 | 35.23 | 5 | - |
| 58 | Eric Fisher | 1953 | 1 | 2 | 0 | 23 | 14 | 11.50 | 204 | 6 | 78 | 1 | 1/78 | 78.00 | 0 | - |
| 59 | Ted Meuli | 1953 | 1 | 2 | 0 | 38 | 23 | 19.00 | - | - | - | - | - | - | 0 | - |
| 60 | Lawrie Miller | 1953–1958 | 13 | 25 | 0 | 346 | 47 | 13.84 | 2 | 0 | 1 | 0 | - | - | 1 | - |
| 61 | Murray Chapple ‡ | 1953–1966 | 14 | 27 | 1 | 497 | 76 | 19.12 | 248 | 17 | 84 | 1 | 1/24 | 84.00 | 10 | - |
| 62 | Eric Dempster | 1953–1954 | 5 | 8 | 2 | 106 | 47 | 17.67 | 544 | 17 | 219 | 2 | 1/24 | 109.50 | 1 | - |
| 63 | Matt Poore | 1953–1956 | 14 | 24 | 1 | 355 | 45 | 15.43 | 788 | 24 | 367 | 9 | 2/28 | 40.78 | 1 | - |
| 64 | Guy Overton | 1953–1954 | 3 | 6 | 1 | 8 | 3* | 1.60 | 729 | 23 | 258 | 9 | 3/65 | 28.67 | 1 | - |
| 65 | John Beck | 1953–1956 | 8 | 15 | 0 | 394 | 99 | 26.27 | - | - | - | - | - | - | 0 | - |
| 66 | Bill Bell | 1954 | 2 | 3 | 3 | 21 | 21* | - | 491 | 13 | 235 | 2 | 1/54 | 117.50 | 1 | - |
| 67 | Ian Leggat | 1954 | 1 | 1 | 0 | 0 | 0 | 0.00 | 24 | 0 | 6 | 0 | - | - | 2 | - |
| 68 | Ian Colquhoun † | 1955 | 2 | 4 | 2 | 1 | 1* | 0.50 | - | - | - | - | - | - | 4 | 0 |
| 69 | Noel McGregor | 1955–1965 | 25 | 47 | 2 | 892 | 111 | 19.82 | - | - | - | - | - | - | 9 | - |
| 70 | Les Watt | 1955 | 1 | 2 | 0 | 2 | 2 | 1.00 | - | - | - | - | - | - | 0 | - |
| 71 | Jack Alabaster | 1955–1972 | 21 | 34 | 6 | 272 | 34 | 9.71 | 3992 | 178 | 1863 | 49 | 4/46 | 38.02 | 7 | - |
| 72 | Zin Harris | 1955–1965 | 9 | 18 | 1 | 378 | 101 | 22.24 | 42 | 2 | 14 | 0 | - | - | 6 | - |
| 73 | Trevor McMahon † | 1955–1956 | 5 | 7 | 4 | 7 | 4* | 2.33 | - | - | - | - | - | - | 7 | 1 |
| 74 | Noel Harford | 1955–1958 | 8 | 15 | 0 | 229 | 93 | 15.27 | - | - | - | - | - | - | 0 | - |
| 75 | Eric Petrie † | 1955–1966 | 14 | 25 | 5 | 258 | 55 | 12.90 | - | - | - | - | - | - | 25 | 0 |
| 76 | John Guy | 1955–1961 | 12 | 23 | 2 | 440 | 102 | 20.95 | - | - | - | - | - | - | 2 | - |
| 77 | Allen Lissette | 1956 | 2 | 4 | 2 | 2 | 1* | 1.00 | 288 | 16 | 124 | 3 | 2/73 | 41.33 | 1 | - |
| 78 | Sammy Guillen † | 1956 | 3 (Note: Sammy Guillen also played Test cricket for the West Indies. Only his record for New Zealand is shown above.) | 6 | 0 | 98 | 41 | 16.33 | - | - | - | - | - | - | 5 | 3 |
| 79 | Ian Sinclair | 1956 | 2 | 4 | 1 | 25 | 18* | 8.33 | 233 | 9 | 120 | 1 | 1/79 | 120.00 | 1 | - |
| 80 | Trevor Barber | 1956 | 1 | 2 | 0 | 17 | 12 | 8.50 | - | - | - | - | - | - | 1 | - |
| 81 | John D'Arcy | 1958 | 5 | 10 | 0 | 136 | 33 | 13.60 | - | - | - | - | - | - | 0 | - |
| 82 | Trevor Meale | 1958 | 2 | 4 | 0 | 21 | 10 | 5.25 | - | - | - | - | - | - | 0 | - |
| 83 | Bill Playle | 1958–1963 | 8 | 15 | 0 | 151 | 65 | 10.07 | - | - | - | - | - | - | 4 | - |
| 84 | John Sparling | 1958–1964 | 11 | 20 | 2 | 229 | 50 | 12.72 | 708 | 33 | 327 | 5 | 1/9 | 65.40 | 3 | - |
| 85 | Bruce Bolton | 1959 | 2 | 3 | 0 | 59 | 33 | 19.67 | - | - | - | - | - | - | 1 | - |
| 86 | Roger Harris | 1959 | 2 | 3 | 0 | 31 | 13 | 10.33 | - | - | - | - | - | - | 0 | - |
| 87 | Ken Hough | 1959 | 2 | 3 | 2 | 62 | 31* | 62.00 | 462 | 23 | 175 | 6 | 3/79 | 29.17 | 1 | - |
| 88 | Gary Bartlett | 1961–1968 | 10 | 18 | 1 | 263 | 40 | 15.47 | 1768 | 64 | 792 | 24 | 6/38 | 33.00 | 8 | - |
| 89 | Paul Barton | 1961–1963 | 7 | 14 | 0 | 285 | 109 | 20.36 | - | - | - | - | - | - | 4 | - |
| 90 | Frank Cameron | 1961–1965 | 19 | 30 | 20 | 116 | 27* | 11.60 | 4570 | 220 | 1849 | 62 | 5/34 | 29.82 | 2 | - |
| 91 | Artie Dick † | 1961–1965 | 17 | 30 | 4 | 370 | 50* | 14.23 | - | - | - | - | - | - | 47 | 4 |
| 92 | Dick Motz | 1961–1969 | 32 | 56 | 3 | 612 | 60 | 11.55 | 7034 | 279 | 3148 | 100 | 6/63 | 31.48 | 9 | - |
| 93 | Graham Dowling ‡ | 1961–1972 | 39 | 77 | 3 | 2306 | 239 | 31.16 | 36 | 2 | 19 | 1 | 1/19 | 19.00 | 23 | - |
| 94 | Barry Sinclair ‡ | 1963–1968 | 21 | 40 | 1 | 1148 | 138 | 29.44 | 60 | 3 | 32 | 2 | 2/32 | 16.00 | 8 | - |
| 95 | Bryan Yuile | 1963–1969 | 17 | 33 | 6 | 481 | 64 | 17.81 | 2897 | 168 | 1213 | 34 | 4/43 | 35.68 | 12 | - |
| 96 | Bruce Morrison | 1963 | 1 | 2 | 0 | 10 | 10 | 5.00 | 186 | 5 | 129 | 2 | 2/129 | 64.50 | 1 | - |
| 97 | Mike Shrimpton | 1963–1974 | 10 | 19 | 0 | 265 | 46 | 13.95 | 257 | 1 | 158 | 5 | 3/35 | 31.60 | 2 | - |
| 98 | Graham Gedye | 1964–1965 | 4 | 8 | 0 | 193 | 55 | 24.13 | - | - | - | - | - | - | 0 | - |
| 99 | John Ward † | 1964–1968 | 8 | 12 | 6 | 75 | 35* | 12.50 | - | - | - | - | - | - | 16 | 1 |
| 100 | Wynne Bradburn | 1964 | 2 | 4 | 0 | 62 | 32 | 15.50 | - | - | - | - | - | - | 2 | - |
| 101 | Bob Cunis | 1964–1972 | 20 | 31 | 8 | 295 | 51 | 12.83 | 4250 | 140 | 1887 | 51 | 6/76 | 37.00 | 1 | - |
| 102 | Richard Collinge | 1965–1978 | 35 | 50 | 13 | 533 | 68* | 14.41 | 7689 | 228 | 3393 | 116 | 6/63 | 29.25 | 10 | - |
| 103 | Bevan Congdon ‡ | 1965–1978 | 61 | 114 | 7 | 3448 | 176 | 32.22 | 5620 | 197 | 2154 | 59 | 5/65 | 36.51 | 44 | - |
| 104 | Ross Morgan | 1965–1972 | 20 | 34 | 1 | 734 | 97 | 22.24 | 1114 | 38 | 609 | 5 | 1/16 | 121.80 | 12 | - |
| 105 | Peter Truscott | 1965 | 1 | 2 | 0 | 29 | 26 | 14.50 | - | - | - | - | - | - | 1 | - |
| 106 | Terry Jarvis | 1965–1973 | 13 | 22 | 1 | 625 | 182 | 29.76 | 12 | 1 | 3 | 0 | - | - | 3 | - |
| 107 | Vic Pollard | 1965–1973 | 32 | 59 | 7 | 1266 | 116 | 24.35 | 4421 | 207 | 1853 | 40 | 3/3 | 46.33 | 19 | - |
| 108 | Bruce Taylor | 1965–1973 | 30 | 50 | 6 | 898 | 124 | 20.41 | 6334 | 206 | 2953 | 111 | 7/74 | 26.60 | 10 | - |
| 109 | Graham Vivian | 1965-1972 | 5 | 6 | 0 | 110 | 43 | 18.33 | 198 | 7 | 107 | 1 | 1/14 | 107.00 | 3 | - |
| 110 | Grahame Bilby | 1966 | 2 | 4 | 0 | 55 | 28 | 13.75 | - | - | - | - | - | - | 3 | - |
| 111 | Tom Puna | 1966 | 3 | 5 | 3 | 31 | 18* | 15.50 | 480 | 20 | 240 | 4 | 2/40 | 60.00 | 1 | - |
| 112 | Mark Burgess ‡ | 1968–1980 | 50 | 92 | 6 | 2684 | 119* | 31.21 | 498 | 27 | 212 | 6 | 3/23 | 35.33 | 34 | - |
| 113 | Roy Harford † | 1968 | 3 | 5 | 2 | 7 | 6 | 2.33 | - | - | - | - | - | - | 11 | - |
| 114 | Bruce Murray | 1968–1971 | 13 | 26 | 1 | 598 | 90 | 23.92 | 6 | 1 | 0 | 1 | 1/0 | 0.00 | 21 | - |
| 115 | Keith Thomson | 1968 | 2 | 4 | 1 | 94 | 69 | 31.33 | 21 | 1 | 9 | 1 | 1/9 | 9.00 | - | - |
| 116 | Brian Hastings | 1969–1976 | 31 | 56 | 6 | 1510 | 117* | 30.20 | 22 | 0 | 9 | 0 | - | - | 23 | - |
| 117 | Barry Milburn † | 1969 | 3 | 3 | 2 | 8 | 4* | 8.00 | - | - | - | - | - | - | 6 | 2 |
| 118 | Glenn Turner ‡ | 1969–1983 | 41 | 73 | 6 | 2991 | 259 | 44.64 | 12 | 1 | 5 | 0 | - | - | 42 | - |
| 119 | Dayle Hadlee | 1969–1978 | 26 | 42 | 5 | 530 | 56 | 14.32 | 4883 | 114 | 2389 | 71 | 4/30 | 33.65 | 8 | - |
| 120 | Hedley Howarth | 1969–1977 | 30 | 42 | 18 | 291 | 61 | 12.13 | 8833 | 393 | 3178 | 86 | 5/34 | 36.95 | 33 | - |
| 121 | Ken Wadsworth † | 1969–1976 | 33 | 51 | 4 | 1010 | 80 | 21.49 | - | - | - | - | - | - | 92 | 4 |
| 122 | Murray Webb | 1971–1974 | 3 | 2 | 0 | 12 | 12 | 6.00 | 732 | 6 | 471 | 4 | 2/114 | 117.75 | 0 | - |
| 123 | Richard Hadlee | 1973–1990 | 86 | 134 | 19 | 3124 | 151* | 27.17 | 21918 | 809 | 9611 | 431 | 9/52 | 22.30 | 39 | - |
| 124 | John Parker ‡ | 1973–1980 | 36 | 63 | 2 | 1498 | 121 | 24.56 | 40 | 2 | 24 | 1 | 1/24 | 24.00 | 30 | - |
| 125 | David O'Sullivan | 1973–1976 | 11 | 21 | 4 | 158 | 23* | 9.29 | 2744 | 75 | 1224 | 18 | 5/148 | 68.00 | 2 | - |
| 126 | Rodney Redmond | 1973 | 1 | 2 | 0 | 163 | 107 | 81.50 | - | - | - | - | - | - | 0 | - |
| 127 | Bryan Andrews | 1974 | 2 | 3 | 2 | 22 | 17 | 22.00 | 256 | 3 | 154 | 2 | 2/40 | 77.00 | 1 | - |
| 128 | John Morrison | 1974–1982 | 17 | 29 | 0 | 656 | 117 | 22.62 | 264 | 17 | 71 | 2 | 2/52 | 35.50 | 9 | - |
| 129 | Jeremy Coney ‡ | 1974–1987 | 52 | 85 | 14 | 2668 | 174* | 37.58 | 2835 | 135 | 966 | 27 | 3/28 | 35.78 | 64 | - |
| 130 | Lance Cairns | 1974–1985 | 43 | 65 | 8 | 928 | 64 | 16.28 | 10628 | 447 | 4280 | 130 | 7/74 | 32.92 | 30 | - |
| 131 | Ewen Chatfield | 1975–1989 | 43 | 54 | 33 | 180 | 21* | 8.57 | 10360 | 489 | 3958 | 123 | 6/73 | 32.18 | 7 | - |
| 132 | Geoff Howarth ‡ | 1975–1985 | 47 | 83 | 5 | 2531 | 147 | 32.45 | 614 | 20 | 271 | 3 | 1/13 | 90.33 | 29 | - |
| 133 | Andy Roberts | 1976 | 7 | 12 | 1 | 254 | 84* | 23.09 | 440 | 15 | 182 | 4 | 1/12 | 45.50 | 4 | - |
| 134 | Robert Anderson | 1976–1978 | 9 | 18 | 0 | 423 | 92 | 23.50 | - | - | - | - | - | - | 1 | - |
| 135 | Warren Lees † | 1976–1983 | 21 | 37 | 4 | 778 | 152 | 23.58 | 5 | 0 | 4 | 0 | - | - | 52 | 7 |
| 136 | Peter Petherick | 1976–1977 | 6 | 11 | 4 | 34 | 13 | 4.86 | 1305 | 37 | 681 | 16 | 3/90 | 42.56 | 4 | - |
| 137 | Murray Parker | 1976 | 3 | 6 | 0 | 89 | 40 | 14.83 | - | - | - | - | - | - | 2 | - |
| 138 | Gary Troup | 1976–1986 | 15 | 18 | 6 | 55 | 13* | 4.58 | 3183 | 105 | 1454 | 39 | 6/95 | 37.28 | 2 | - |
| 139 | Jock Edwards † | 1977–1981 | 8 | 15 | 0 | 377 | 55 | 25.13 | - | - | - | - | - | - | 7 | 0 |
| 140 | Stephen Boock | 1978–1989 | 30 | 41 | 8 | 207 | 37 | 6.27 | 6598 | 327 | 2564 | 74 | 7/87 | 34.65 | 14 | - |
| 141 | John Wright ‡ | 1978–1993 | 82 | 148 | 7 | 5334 | 185 | 37.83 | 30 | 1 | 5 | 0 | - | - | 38 | - |
| 142 | Brendon Bracewell | 1978–1985 | 6 | 12 | 2 | 24 | 8 | 2.40 | 1036 | 29 | 585 | 14 | 3/110 | 41.79 | 1 | - |
| 143 | Bruce Edgar † | 1978–1986 | 39 | 68 | 4 | 1958 | 161 | 30.59 | 18 | 1 | 3 | 0 | - | - | 14 | 0 |
| 144 | John Reid | 1979–1986 | 19 | 31 | 3 | 1296 | 180 | 46.29 | 18 | 1 | 7 | 0 | - | - | 9 | - |
| 145 | Peter Webb | 1980 | 2 | 3 | 0 | 11 | 5 | 3.67 | - | - | - | - | - | - | 2 | - |
| 146 | Paul McEwan | 1980–1984 | 4 | 7 | 1 | 96 | 40* | 16.00 | 36 | 1 | 13 | 0 | - | - | 5 | - |
| 147 | John Bracewell | 1980–1990 | 41 | 60 | 11 | 1001 | 110 | 20.43 | 8403 | 360 | 3653 | 102 | 6/32 | 35.81 | 31 | - |
| 148 | Ian Smith ‡† | 1980–1992 | 63 | 88 | 17 | 1815 | 173 | 25.56 | 18 | 1 | 5 | 0 | - | - | 168 | 8 |
| 149 | Martin Snedden | 1981–1990 | 25 | 30 | 8 | 327 | 33* | 14.86 | 4775 | 194 | 2199 | 58 | 5/68 | 37.91 | 7 | - |
| 150 | Martin Crowe ‡ | 1982–1995 | 77 | 131 | 11 | 5444 | 299 | 45.37 | 1377 | 52 | 676 | 14 | 2/25 | 48.29 | 71 | - |
| 151 | Jeff Crowe ‡ | 1983–1990 | 39 | 65 | 4 | 1601 | 128 | 26.25 | 18 | 1 | 9 | 0 | - | - | 41 | - |
| 152 | Evan Gray | 1983–1988 | 10 | 16 | 0 | 248 | 50 | 15.50 | 2076 | 87 | 886 | 17 | 3/73 | 52.12 | 6 | - |
| 153 | Trevor Franklin | 1983–1991 | 21 | 37 | 1 | 828 | 101 | 23.00 | - | - | - | - | - | - | 8 | - |
| 154 | Derek Stirling | 1984–1986 | 6 | 9 | 2 | 108 | 26 | 15.43 | 902 | 24 | 601 | 13 | 4/88 | 46.23 | 1 | - |
| 155 | Ken Rutherford ‡ | 1985–1995 | 56 | 99 | 8 | 2465 | 107* | 27.09 | 256 | 3 | 161 | 1 | 1/38 | 161.00 | 32 | - |
| 156 | Vaughan Brown | 1985 | 2 | 3 | 1 | 51 | 36* | 25.50 | 342 | 13 | 176 | 1 | 1/17 | 176.00 | 3 | - |
| 157 | Stu Gillespie | 1986 | 1 | 1 | 0 | 28 | 28 | 28.00 | 162 | 2 | 79 | 1 | 1/79 | 79.00 | 0 | - |
| 158 | Gary Robertson | 1986 | 1 | 1 | 0 | 12 | 12 | 12.00 | 144 | 6 | 91 | 1 | 1/91 | 91.00 | 0 | - |
| 159 | Willie Watson | 1986–1993 | 15 | 18 | 6 | 60 | 11 | 5.00 | 3486 | 182 | 1387 | 40 | 6/78 | 34.68 | 4 | - |
| 160 | Tony Blain † | 1986–1994 | 11 | 20 | 3 | 456 | 78 | 26.82 | - | - | - | - | - | - | 19 | 2 |
| 161 | Dipak Patel | 1987–1997 | 37 | 66 | 8 | 1200 | 99 | 20.69 | 6594 | 253 | 3154 | 75 | 6/50 | 42.05 | 15 | - |
| 162 | Phil Horne | 1987–1990 | 4 | 7 | 0 | 71 | 27 | 10.14 | - | - | - | - | - | - | 3 | - |
| 163 | Andrew Jones | 1987–1995 | 39 | 74 | 8 | 2922 | 186 | 44.27 | 328 | 8 | 194 | 1 | 1/40 | 194.00 | 25 | - |
| 164 | Danny Morrison | 1987–1997 | 48 | 71 | 26 | 379 | 42 | 8.42 | 10064 | 313 | 5549 | 160 | 7/89 | 34.68 | 14 | - |
| 165 | Mark Greatbatch | 1988–1996 | 41 | 71 | 5 | 2021 | 146* | 30.62 | 6 | 1 | 0 | 0 | - | - | 27 | - |
| 166 | Robert Vance | 1988–1989 | 4 | 7 | 0 | 207 | 68 | 29.57 | - | - | - | - | - | - | 0 | - |
| 167 | Chris Kuggeleijn | 1988 | 2 | 4 | 0 | 7 | 7 | 1.75 | 97 | 2 | 67 | 1 | 1/50 | 67.00 | 1 | - |
| 168 | Chris Cairns | 1989–2004 | 62 | 104 | 5 | 3320 | 158 | 33.54 | 11698 | 414 | 6410 | 218 | 7/27 | 29.40 | 14 | - |
| 169 | Shane Thomson | 1990–1995 | 19 | 35 | 4 | 958 | 120* | 30.90 | 1990 | 74 | 953 | 19 | 3/63 | 50.16 | 7 | - |
| 170 | Mark Priest | 1990–1998 | 3 | 4 | 0 | 56 | 26 | 14.00 | 377 | 15 | 158 | 3 | 2/42 | 52.67 | 0 | - |
| 171 | Adam Parore † | 1990–2002 | 78 | 128 | 19 | 2865 | 110 | 26.28 | - | - | - | - | - | - | 197 | 7 |
| 172 | Grant Bradburn | 1990–2001 | 7 | 10 | 2 | 105 | 30* | 13.13 | 867 | 28 | 460 | 6 | 3/134 | 76.67 | 6 | - |
| 173 | Chris Pringle | 1990–1995 | 14 | 21 | 4 | 175 | 30 | 10.29 | 2985 | 113 | 1389 | 30 | 7/52 | 46.30 | 3 | - |
| 174 | David White | 1990 | 2 | 4 | 0 | 31 | 18 | 7.75 | 3 | 0 | 5 | 0 | - | - | 0 | - |
| 175 | Blair Hartland | 1992–1994 | 9 | 18 | 0 | 303 | 52 | 16.83 | - | - | - | - | - | - | 5 | - |
| 176 | Murphy Su'a | 1992–1995 | 13 | 18 | 5 | 165 | 44 | 12.69 | 2843 | 92 | 1377 | 36 | 5/73 | 38.25 | 8 | - |
| 177 | Rod Latham | 1992–1993 | 4 | 7 | 0 | 219 | 119 | 31.29 | 18 | 2 | 6 | 0 | - | - | 5 | - |
| 178 | Simon Doull | 1992–2000 | 32 | 50 | 11 | 570 | 46 | 14.62 | 6053 | 251 | 2872 | 98 | 7/65 | 29.31 | 16 | - |
| 179 | Mark Haslam | 1992–1995 | 4 | 2 | 1 | 4 | 3 | 4.00 | 493 | 19 | 245 | 2 | 1/33 | 122.50 | 2 | - |
| 180 | Dion Nash ‡ | 1992–2001 | 32 | 45 | 14 | 729 | 89* | 23.52 | 6196 | 312 | 2649 | 93 | 6/27 | 28.48 | 13 | - |
| 181 | Chris Harris | 1992–2002 | 23 | 42 | 4 | 777 | 71 | 20.45 | 2560 | 106 | 1170 | 16 | 2/16 | 73.13 | 14 | - |
| 182 | Michael Owens | 1992–1994 | 8 | 12 | 6 | 16 | 8* | 2.67 | 1074 | 42 | 585 | 17 | 4/99 | 34.41 | 3 | - |
| 183 | Justin Vaughan | 1992–1997 | 6 | 12 | 1 | 201 | 44 | 18.27 | 1040 | 41 | 450 | 11 | 4/27 | 40.91 | 4 | - |
| 184 | Blair Pocock | 1993–1997 | 15 | 29 | 0 | 665 | 85 | 22.93 | 24 | 0 | 20 | 0 | - | - | 5 | - |
| 185 | Richard de Groen | 1993–1994 | 5 | 10 | 4 | 45 | 26 | 7.50 | 1060 | 44 | 505 | 11 | 3/40 | 45.91 | 0 | - |
| 186 | Bryan Young | 1993–1999 | 35 | 68 | 4 | 2034 | 267* | 31.78 | - | - | - | - | - | - | 54 | - |
| 187 | Matthew Hart | 1994–1995 | 14 | 24 | 4 | 353 | 45 | 17.65 | 3086 | 127 | 1438 | 29 | 5/77 | 49.59 | 9 | - |
| 188 | Stephen Fleming ‡ | 1994–2008 | 111 | 189 | 10 | 7172 | 274* | 40.06 | - | - | - | - | - | - | 171 | - |
| 189 | Heath Davis | 1994–1997 | 5 | 7 | 4 | 20 | 8* | 6.67 | 1010 | 26 | 499 | 17 | 5/63 | 29.35 | 4 | - |
| 190 | Gavin Larsen | 1994–1996 | 8 | 13 | 4 | 127 | 26* | 14.11 | 1967 | 109 | 689 | 24 | 3/57 | 28.71 | 5 | - |
| 191 | Darrin Murray | 1994–1995 | 8 | 16 | 1 | 303 | 52 | 20.20 | - | - | - | - | - | - | 6 | - |
| 192 | Kerry Walmsley | 1995–2000 | 3 | 5 | 0 | 13 | 5 | 2.60 | 774 | 26 | 391 | 9 | 3/70 | 43.44 | 0 | - |
| 193 | Lee Germon ‡† | 1995–1997 | 12 | 21 | 3 | 382 | 55 | 21.22 | - | - | - | - | - | - | 27 | 2 |
| 194 | Roger Twose | 1995–1999 | 16 | 27 | 2 | 628 | 94 | 25.12 | 211 | 2 | 130 | 3 | 2/36 | 43.33 | 5 | - |
| 195 | Craig Spearman | 1995–2000 | 19 | 37 | 2 | 922 | 112 | 26.34 | - | - | - | - | - | - | 21 | - |
| 196 | Geoff Allott | 1996–1999 | 10 | 15 | 7 | 27 | 8* | 3.38 | 2023 | 62 | 1111 | 19 | 4/74 | 58.47 | 2 | - |
| 197 | Nathan Astle | 1996–2006 | 81 | 137 | 10 | 4702 | 222 | 37.02 | 5688 | 317 | 2143 | 51 | 3/27 | 42.01 | 70 | - |
| 198 | Robert Kennedy | 1996 | 4 | 5 | 1 | 28 | 22 | 7.00 | 636 | 17 | 380 | 6 | 3/28 | 63.33 | 2 | - |
| 199 | Greg Loveridge | 1996 | 1 | 1 | 1 | 4 | 4* | - | - | - | - | - | - | - | 0 | - |
| 200 | Daniel Vettori ‡ | 1997–2014 | 112 (Note: Daniel Vettori has also played Test cricket for the ICC World XI. Only his record for New Zealand is shown above.) | 172 | 22 | 4523 | 140 | 30.15 | 28652 | 1187 | 12330 | 361 | 7/87 | 34.15 | 58 | - |
| 201 | Matt Horne | 1997–2003 | 35 | 65 | 2 | 1788 | 157 | 28.38 | 66 | 7 | 26 | 0 | - | - | 17 | - |
| 202 | Shayne O'Connor | 1997–2001 | 19 | 27 | 9 | 103 | 20 | 5.72 | 3667 | 149 | 1724 | 53 | 5/51 | 32.53 | 6 | - |
| 203 | David Sewell | 1997 | 1 | 1 | 1 | 1 | 1* | - | 138 | 3 | 90 | 0 | - | - | 0 | - |
| 204 | Craig McMillan | 1997–2005 | 55 | 91 | 10 | 3116 | 142 | 38.47 | 2502 | 101 | 1257 | 28 | 3/48 | 44.89 | 22 | - |
| 205 | Paul Wiseman | 1998–2005 | 25 | 34 | 8 | 366 | 36 | 14.08 | 5660 | 209 | 2903 | 61 | 5/82 | 47.59 | 11 | - |
| 206 | Matthew Bell | 1998–2008 | 18 | 32 | 2 | 729 | 107 | 24.30 | - | - | - | - | - | - | 19 | - |
| 207 | Gary Stead | 1999 | 5 | 8 | 0 | 278 | 78 | 34.75 | 6 | 0 | 1 | 0 | - | - | 2 | - |
| 208 | Mathew Sinclair | 1999–2010 | 33 | 56 | 5 | 1635 | 214 | 32.05 | 42 | 2 | 14 | 0 | - | - | 31 | - |
| 209 | Daryl Tuffey | 2000–2010 | 26 | 36 | 10 | 427 | 80* | 16.42 | 4877 | 220 | 2445 | 77 | 6/54 | 31.75 | 15 | - |
| 210 | Mark Richardson | 2000–2004 | 38 | 65 | 3 | 2776 | 145 | 44.77 | 66 | 0 | 21 | 1 | 1/16 | 21.00 | 26 | - |
| 211 | Chris Martin | 2000–2013 | 71 | 104 | 52 | 123 | 12* | 2.36 | 14026 | 486 | 7878 | 233 | 6/26 | 33.81 | 14 | - |
| 212 | Brooke Walker | 2000–2002 | 5 | 8 | 2 | 118 | 27* | 19.67 | 669 | 17 | 399 | 5 | 2/92 | 79.80 | 0 | - |
| 213 | Hamish Marshall | 2000–2006 | 13 | 19 | 2 | 652 | 160 | 38.35 | 6 | 0 | 4 | 0 | - | - | 1 | - |
| 214 | James Franklin | 2001–2013 | 31 | 46 | 7 | 808 | 122* | 20.71 | 4767 | 143 | 2786 | 82 | 6/119 | 33.97 | 12 | - |
| 215 | Chris Drum | 2001–2002 | 5 | 5 | 2 | 10 | 4 | 3.33 | 806 | 27 | 482 | 16 | 3/36 | 30.13 | 4 | - |
| 216 | Shane Bond | 2001–2009 | 18 | 20 | 7 | 168 | 41* | 12.92 | 3372 | 113 | 1922 | 87 | 6/51 | 22.09 | 8 | - |
| 217 | Lou Vincent | 2001–2007 | 23 | 40 | 1 | 1332 | 224 | 34.15 | 6 | 0 | 2 | 0 | - | - | 19 | - |
| 218 | Ian Butler | 2002–2004 | 8 | 10 | 2 | 76 | 26 | 9.50 | 1368 | 37 | 884 | 24 | 6/46 | 36.83 | 4 | - |
| 219 | Andre Adams | 2002 | 1 | 2 | 0 | 18 | 11 | 9.00 | 190 | 5 | 105 | 6 | 3/44 | 17.50 | 1 | - |
| 220 | Robbie Hart † | 2002–2003 | 11 | 19 | 3 | 260 | 57* | 16.25 | - | - | - | - | - | - | 29 | 1 |
| 221 | Scott Styris | 2002–2007 | 29 | 48 | 4 | 1586 | 170 | 36.04 | 1966 | 76 | 1023 | 20 | 3/28 | 51.15 | 23 | - |
| 222 | Jacob Oram | 2002–2009 | 33 | 59 | 10 | 1780 | 133 | 36.32 | 4964 | 240 | 1983 | 60 | 4/41 | 33.05 | 15 | - |
| 223 | Richard Jones | 2003 | 1 | 2 | 0 | 23 | 16 | 11.50 | - | - | - | - | - | - | 0 | - |
| 224 | Brendon McCullum ‡† | 2004–2016 | 101 | 176 | 9 | 6453 | 302 | 38.64 | 175 | 5 | 88 | 1 | 1/1 | 88.00 | 198 | 11 |
| 225 | Michael Papps | 2004–2007 | 8 | 16 | 1 | 246 | 86 | 16.40 | - | - | - | - | - | - | 11 | - |
| 226 | Michael Mason | 2004 | 1 | 2 | 0 | 3 | 3 | 1.50 | 132 | 5 | 105 | 0 | - | - | 0 | - |
| 227 | Kyle Mills | 2004–2009 | 19 | 30 | 5 | 289 | 57 | 11.56 | 2902 | 118 | 1453 | 44 | 4/16 | 33.02 | 4 | - |
| 228 | Craig Cumming | 2005–2008 | 11 | 19 | 2 | 441 | 74 | 25.94 | - | - | - | - | - | - | 3 | - |
| 229 | Iain O'Brien | 2005–2009 | 22 | 34 | 5 | 219 | 31 | 7.55 | 4394 | 158 | 2429 | 73 | 6/75 | 33.27 | 7 | - |
| 230 | James Marshall | 2005 | 7 | 11 | 0 | 218 | 52 | 19.81 | - | - | - | - | - | - | 5 | - |
| 231 | Peter Fulton | 2006–2013 | 17 | 28 | 1 | 843 | 136 | 31.22 | - | - | - | - | - | - | 17 | - |
| 232 | Jamie How | 2006–2009 | 19 | 35 | 1 | 772 | 92 | 22.70 | 12 | 1 | 4 | 0 | - | - | 18 | - |
| 233 | Jeetan Patel | 2006–2017 | 24 | 38 | 8 | 381 | 47 | 12.70 | 5833 | 202 | 3078 | 65 | 5/110 | 47.35 | 13 | - |
| 234 | Ross Taylor ‡ | 2007–2022 | 112 | 196 | 24 | 7683 | 290 | 44.66 | 99 | 3 | 48 | 3 | 2/4 | 16.00 | 163 | - |
| 235 | Mark Gillespie | 2007–2012 | 5 | 8 | 1 | 76 | 27 | 10.85 | 868 | 24 | 631 | 22 | 6/113 | 28.68 | 1 | - |
| 236 | Grant Elliott | 2008–2009 | 5 | 9 | 1 | 86 | 25 | 10.75 | 282 | 9 | 140 | 4 | 2/8 | 35.00 | 2 | - |
| 237 | Tim Southee ‡ | 2008–2024 | 107 | 156 | 11 | 2245 | 77* | 15.48 | 23490 | 889 | 11832 | 391 | 7/64 | 30.26 | 86 | - |
| 238 | Daniel Flynn | 2008–2013 | 24 | 45 | 5 | 1038 | 95 | 25.95 | 6 | 1 | 0 | 0 | - | - | 10 | - |
| 239 | Aaron Redmond | 2008 | 7 | 14 | 1 | 299 | 83 | 23.00 | 73 | 2 | 62 | 3 | 2/47 | 20.66 | 5 | - |
| 240 | Gareth Hopkins † | 2008–2012 | 4 | 7 | 1 | 71 | 15 | 11.82 | - | - | - | - | - | - | 9 | 0 |
| 241 | Jesse Ryder | 2008–2011 | 18 | 33 | 2 | 1269 | 201 | 40.93 | 492 | 23 | 280 | 5 | 2/7 | 56.00 | 12 | - |
| 242 | Tim McIntosh | 2008–2011 | 17 | 33 | 2 | 854 | 136 | 27.54 | - | - | - | - | - | - | 10 | - |
| 243 | Martin Guptill | 2009–2016 | 47 | 89 | 1 | 2586 | 189 | 29.38 | 428 | 3 | 298 | 8 | 3/11 | 37.25 | 50 | - |
| 244 | BJ Watling † | 2009–2021 | 75 | 117 | 16 | 3790 | 205 | 37.52 | - | - | - | - | - | - | 267 | 8 |
| 245 | Peter Ingram | 2010 | 2 | 4 | 0 | 61 | 42 | 15.25 | - | - | - | - | - | - | 0 | - |
| 246 | Brent Arnel | 2010–2012 | 6 | 12 | 4 | 45 | 8* | 5.62 | 1008 | 37 | 566 | 9 | 4/95 | 62.88 | 3 | - |
| 247 | Hamish Bennett | 2010 | 1 | 1 | 0 | 4 | 4 | 4.00 | 90 | 2 | 47 | 0 | - | - | 0 | - |
| 248 | Kane Williamson ‡ | 2010–2026 | 110 | 195 | 19 | 9515 | 251 | 54.06 | 2151 | 48 | 1207 | 30 | 4/44 | 40.23 | 96 | - |
| 249 | Andy McKay | 2010 | 1 | 2 | 1 | 25 | 20* | 25.00 | 186 | 5 | 120 | 1 | 1/120 | 120.00 | 0 | - |
| 250 | Reece Young † | 2011 | 5 | 10 | 3 | 169 | 57 | 24.14 | - | - | - | - | - | - | 8 | 0 |
| 251 | Doug Bracewell | 2011–2023 | 28 | 45 | 4 | 568 | 47 | 13.85 | 5164 | 157 | 2873 | 74 | 6/40 | 38.82 | 11 | - |
| 252 | Dean Brownlie | 2011–2013 | 14 | 25 | 1 | 711 | 109 | 29.62 | 66 | 0 | 52 | 1 | 1/13 | 52.00 | 17 | - |
| 253 | Trent Boult | 2011–2022 | 78 | 94 | 46 | 759 | 52* | 15.81 | 17417 | 656 | 8717 | 317 | 6/30 | 27.49 | 43 | - |
| 254 | Rob Nicol | 2012 | 2 | 4 | 0 | 28 | 19 | 7.00 | 17 | 1 | 13 | 0 | - | - | 2 | - |
| 255 | Kruger van Wyk † | 2012 | 9 | 17 | 1 | 341 | 71 | 21.31 | - | - | - | - | - | - | 23 | 1 |
| 256 | Neil Wagner | 2012–2024 | 64 | 84 | 24 | 875 | 66* | 14.58 | 13725 | 473 | 7169 | 260 | 7/39 | 27.57 | 19 | - |
| 257 | Todd Astle | 2012–2020 | 5 | 6 | 1 | 98 | 35 | 19.60 | 667 | 16 | 368 | 7 | 3/39 | 52.57 | 3 | - |
| 258 | Colin Munro | 2013 | 1 | 2 | 0 | 15 | 15 | 7.50 | 108 | 4 | 40 | 2 | 2/40 | 20.00 | 0 | - |
| 259 | Bruce Martin | 2013 | 5 | 6 | 1 | 74 | 41 | 14.80 | 1518 | 77 | 646 | 12 | 4/43 | 53.83 | 0 | - |
| 260 | Hamish Rutherford | 2013–2015 | 16 | 29 | 1 | 755 | 171 | 26.96 | 6 | 0 | 2 | 0 | - | - | 6 | - |
| 261 | Corey Anderson | 2013–2016 | 13 | 22 | 1 | 683 | 116 | 32.52 | 1302 | 34 | 659 | 16 | 3/47 | 41.18 | 7 | - |
| 262 | Ish Sodhi | 2013–2024 | 21 | 31 | 4 | 561 | 65 | 20.77 | 4043 | 91 | 2500 | 58 | 6/86 | 43.10 | 11 | - |
| 263 | Tom Latham ‡† | 2014– | 95 | 171 | 6 | 6450 | 264* | 39.09 | - | - | - | - | - | - | 117 | 0 |
| 264 | James Neesham | 2014–2017 | 12 | 22 | 1 | 709 | 137* | 33.76 | 1076 | 18 | 675 | 14 | 3/42 | 48.21 | 12 | - |
| 265 | Mark Craig | 2014–2016 | 15 | 25 | 9 | 589 | 67 | 36.81 | 3669 | 100 | 2326 | 50 | 7/94 | 46.52 | 14 | - |
| 266 | Matt Henry | 2015– | 35 | 49 | 6 | 676 | 72 | 15.72 | 7642 | 266 | 3959 | 152 | 7/23 | 26.04 | 14 | - |
| 267 | Luke Ronchi † | 2015–2016 | 4 | 8 | 0 | 319 | 88 | 39.87 | - | - | - | - | - | - | 5 | 0 |
| 268 | Mitchell Santner ‡ | 2015– | 33 | 46 | 2 | 1089 | 126 | 24.75 | 5697 | 189 | 2716 | 80 | 7/53 | 33.95 | 27 | - |
| 269 | Henry Nicholls | 2016– | 60 | 94 | 9 | 3358 | 200* | 39.50 | - | - | - | - | - | - | 36 | - |
| 270 | Colin de Grandhomme | 2016–2022 | 29 | 44 | 7 | 1432 | 120* | 38.70 | 4054 | 163 | 1615 | 49 | 6/41 | 32.95 | 19 | - |
| 271 | Jeet Raval | 2016–2020 | 24 | 39 | 1 | 1143 | 132 | 30.07 | 84 | 1 | 34 | 1 | 1/33 | 34.00 | 21 | - |
| 272 | Neil Broom | 2017 | 2 | 3 | 0 | 32 | 20 | 10.66 | - | - | - | - | - | - | 0 | - |
| 273 | Tom Blundell † | 2017– | 48 | 79 | 7 | 2482 | 186 | 34.47 | 18 | 0 | 13 | 0 | - | - | 124 | 16 |
| 274 | Ajaz Patel | 2018– | 22 | 32 | 13 | 219 | 35 | 11.52 | 5020 | 160 | 2623 | 91 | 10/119 | 28.82 | 10 | - |
| 275 | Will Somerville | 2018–2021 | 6 | 10 | 2 | 115 | 40* | 14.37 | 1466 | 34 | 724 | 15 | 4/75 | 48.26 | 0 | - |
| 276 | Daryl Mitchell | 2019– | 39 | 62 | 6 | 2411 | 190 | 43.05 | 805 | 32 | 410 | 4 | 1/7 | 102.50 | 62 | - |
| 277 | Lockie Ferguson | 2019 | 1 | 2 | 2 | 1 | 1* | - | 66 | 1 | 47 | 0 | - | - | 0 | - |
| 278 | Glenn Phillips | 2020– | 19 | 33 | 6 | 956 | 100 | 35.40 | 1722 | 26 | 1024 | 33 | 5/45 | 31.03 | 20 | - |
| 279 | Kyle Jamieson | 2020– | 21 | 30 | 5 | 523 | 51* | 20.92 | 3948 | 199 | 1821 | 90 | 6/48 | 20.23 | 7 | - |
| 280 | Will Young | 2020– | 23 | 41 | 3 | 1215 | 89 | 31.97 | - | - | - | - | - | - | 26 | - |
| 281 | Devon Conway | 2021– | 36 | 67 | 2 | 2761 | 227 | 42.47 | - | - | - | - | - | - | 16 | - |
| 282 | Rachin Ravindra | 2021– | 24 | 44 | 5 | 1865 | 240 | 47.82 | 1050 | 34 | 527 | 11 | 3/33 | 47.90 | 12 | - |
| 283 | Michael Bracewell | 2022– | 10 | 17 | 1 | 339 | 74* | 21.18 | 1995 | 52 | 1198 | 25 | 4/75 | 47.92 | 14 | - |
| 284 | Scott Kuggeleijn | 2023– | 3 | 6 | 0 | 92 | 44 | 15.33 | 354 | 4 | 294 | 6 | 2/75 | 49.00 | 1 | - |
| 285 | Blair Tickner | 2023– | 6 | 4 | 3 | 17 | 8 | 17.00 | 901 | 17 | 604 | 22 | 5/76 | 27.45 | 1 | - |
| 286 | William O'Rourke | 2024– | 14 | 25 | 15 | 38 | 19 | 3.80 | 2047 | 76 | 1203 | 49 | 5/34 | 24.55 | 6 | - |
| 287 | Ben Sears | 2024– | 3 | 4 | 3 | 19 | 19* | 19.00 | 474 | 15 | 310 | 8 | 4/90 | 38.75 | 2 | - |
| 288 | Nathan Smith | 2024– | 8 | 13 | 1 | 210 | 42 | 17.50 | 1254 | 41 | 859 | 34 | 6/40 | 25.26 | 4 | - |
| 289 | Jacob Duffy | 2025– | 4 | 5 | 1 | 78 | 36 | 19.50 | 1030 | 46 | 407 | 25 | 5/34 | 16.28 | 2 | - |
| 290 | Matthew Fisher | 2025– | 1 | - | - | - | - | - | 71 | 1 | 38 | 2 | 1/16 | 19.00 | 0 | - |
| 291 | Zak Foulkes | 2025– | 6 | 6 | 3 | 45 | 23* | 15.00 | 1077 | 39 | 538 | 21 | 5/37 | 25.61 | 3 | - |
| 292 | Mitchell Hay † | 2025– | 1 | 1 | 0 | 61 | 61 | 61.00 | - | - | - | - | - | - | 3 | 0 |
| 293 | Michael Rae | 2025– | 2 | 1 | 0 | 13 | 13 | 13.00 | 392 | 14 | 226 | 8 | 3/45 | 28.25 | 2 | - |
| 294 | Dean Foxcroft | 2026– | 1 | 1 | 0 | 98 | 98 | 98.00 | 6 | 1 | 0 | 0 | - | - | 0 | - |

== Shirt Number History ==
From the 2019 Ashes Series, names and numbers were introduced on all Test player's shirts. This is for the ICC World Test Championship that is played between the top nine cricket nations over two years. The top two nations at the end of the two years play in the Final, where the Winner is the World Test Champion.

| S/N | Current Player | Past Player(s) |
|---|---|---|
| 1 | Jeet Raval | |
| 2 | Will O'Rourke | |
| 3 | | Ross Taylor (2019–2022) |
| 4 | Michael Bracewell | |
| 8 | Rachin Ravindra | |
| 10 | Nathan Smith | Neil Wagner (2019-2023) |
| 12 | Kyle Jamieson | |
| 13 | Blair Tickner | |
| 14 | Ben Sears | |
| 18 | Trent Boult | |
| 21 | Matt Henry | |
| 22 | | Kane Williamson (2019-2026) |
| 23 | Glenn Phillips | |
| 24 | Ajaz Patel | |
| 28 | | William Somerville |
| 32 | Will Young | |
| 34 | Doug Bracewell | |
| 38 | Tim Southee | |
| 47 | | BJ Watling |
| 48 | Tom Latham | |
| 61 | Ish Sodhi | |
| 66 | Tom Blundell | |
| 68 | Scott Kuggeleijn | |
| 74 | Mitchell Santner | |
| 75 | Daryl Mitchell | |
| 77 | | Colin de Grandhomme |
| 86 | Henry Nicholls | |
| 87 | Lockie Ferguson | |
| 88 | Devon Conway | |

== See also ==
- List of New Zealand ODI cricketers
- List of New Zealand Twenty20 International cricketers
- New Zealand national cricket team
- List of New Zealand Test cricket records
