= Greg Loveridge =

New Zealand cricketer (born 1975)

Personal information
- Full name: Greg Riaka Loveridge
- Born: 15 January 1975 (age 51); Palmerston North, New Zealand
- Batting: Right-handed
- Bowling: Right-arm leg-spin
- Role: Bowler

International information
- National side: New Zealand
- Test debut (cap 199): 13 January 1996 v Zimbabwe
- Last Test: 13 January 1996 v Zimbabwe

Domestic team information
- Years: Team
- 1994/95–2002/03: Central Districts
- 1998–1999: Cambridge University

Career statistics
Competition	Test	FC	LA
Matches	1	29	25
Runs scored	4	935	326
Batting average	–	23.37	17.15
100s/50s	0/0	1/2	0/2
Top score	4*	126	54
Balls bowled	–	4,267	811
Wickets	–	46	21
Bowling average	–	53.23	29.00
5 wickets in innings	–	1	0
10 wickets in match	–	0	0
Best bowling	–	5/59	4/25
Catches/stumpings	0/–	17/–	5/–
- Source: Cricinfo, 30 April 2017

Greg Riaka Loveridge (born 15 January 1975) is a former cricketer who played one Test match for New Zealand in 1996.

Born in Palmerston North, Loveridge represented Central Districts in New Zealand's domestic competitions, as well as playing for Manawatu in the Hawke Cup and in England for Cambridge University.

== International career ==
Batting in the first innings of his only Test, against Zimbabwe, Loveridge fractured a knuckle and was unable to bowl. Loveridge became only the sixth batsman, after Charles Bannerman, Talat Ali, Ewen Chatfield, Andy Lloyd and Sanjay Manjrekar, to retire hurt in his debut Test.

== After cricket ==
He is now the general manager of New Zealand property company Robert Jones Holdings.

Loveridge has a Bachelor of Arts in history from Cambridge University and a master's in history from Massey University, completed in 2003.
