= John Sigley =

New Zealand cricketer (1931–2021)

Personal information
- Full name: Ernest John Sigley
- Born: 9 December 1931; Wellington, New Zealand
- Died: 25 June 2021 (aged 89); Auckland, New Zealand
- Batting: Right-handed
- Bowling: Right-arm medium pace, right-arm off-break
- Relatives: John Beck (brother-in-law)

Domestic team information
- Years: Team
- 1959–60 to 1960–61: Wellington

Career statistics
Competition	First-class
Matches	5
Runs scored	140
Batting average	15.55
100s/50s	0/0
Top score	44
Balls bowled	428
Wickets	4
Bowling average	43.75
5 wickets in innings	0
10 wickets in match	0
Best bowling	2–63
Catches/stumpings	1/0
- Source: Cricinfo, 4 October 2021

Ernest John Sigley (9 December 1931 – 25 June 2021) was a New Zealand cricketer. He played in five first-class matches for Wellington from 1959 to 1961.

== See also ==
- List of Wellington representative cricketers
