= Ian Leggat =

New Zealand cricketer

Personal information
- Full name: Ian Bruce Leggat
- Born: 7 June 1930 (age 96); Invercargill, New Zealand
- Batting: Right-handed
- Bowling: Right-arm medium
- Relatives: Gordon Leggat (cousin)

International information
- National side: New Zealand (1954)
- Only Test (cap 67): 1 January 1954 v South Africa

Domestic team information
- Years: Team
- 1950/51–1961/62: Central Districts

Career statistics
Competition	Test	First-class
Matches	1	40
Runs scored	0	1,319
Batting average	0.00	20.29
100s/50s	0/0	2/4
Top score	0	142*
Balls bowled	24	5,032
Wickets	0	58
Bowling average	–	35.46
5 wickets in innings	–	1
10 wickets in match	–	0
Best bowling	–	5/60
Catches/stumpings	2/–	37/–
- Source: Cricinfo, 1 April 2017

Ian Bruce Leggat (born 7 June 1930) is a New Zealand former cricketer who played in one Test match in 1954. He was a middle-order batsman, a medium-pace bowler, and a slips fieldsman. His cousin, Gordon Leggat, also played Test cricket for New Zealand in the 1950s.

== Early life ==
Leggat was born in Invercargill, New Zealand. He attended Nelson College from 1944 to 1948, where he was a prefect and played for the school's 1st XI cricket and 1st XV rugby teams. After leaving school, he worked as a survey draftsman.

== Cricket career ==
Leggat played first-class cricket for Central Districts from 1950–51 to 1961–62. In 1952–53 he and Harry Cave added 239 for the ninth wicket for Central Districts against Otago at Dunedin. Leggat scored 142 not out batting at number 10. It was his first fifty in first-class cricket; he did not score another until 1958–59. This innings helped him to score 212 runs at 53.00 in 1952–53; he also took 7 wickets at 40.14.

He was a surprise selection for the tour of South Africa in 1953-54. In eight first-class games on the tour he made 138 runs at 12.54 and took 5 wickets at 33.60. He played in the Third Test, making a duck and taking no wickets in three overs, and taking two catches.

Leggat scored one more century, 115 against Canterbury in 1959–60, and took his best bowling figures, 5 for 60, against Canterbury in 1961–62. He played in the trial match in 1958-59, taking 4 for 21 and 3 for 27 for South Island against North Island, but was only used as twelfth man for the two subsequent Tests against England.

Leggat also played for Nelson in the Hawke Cup from 1947 to 1969. He holds the record for the number of runs in Hawke Cup challenge matches, 1,968 at an average of 35.78 in 38 matches, and is third in the bowling, with 134 wickets at an average of 16.03. When a Hawke Cup "team of the century" was selected to mark the centenary of the competition in 2011, he was one of the 11 players chosen.

After his playing career, Leggat moved to Hamilton in the North Island and became an administrator and selector for Northern Districts. Leggat is the last surviving player from Central Districts' inaugural first-class team in December 1950.

== See also ==
- One-Test wonder
