= List of Test cricketers born in non-Test playing nations =

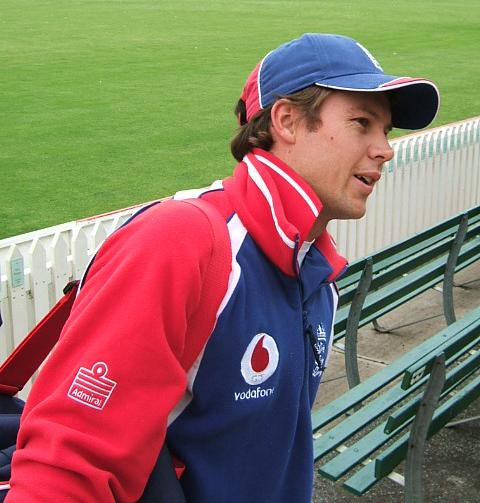
Geraint Jones was born in Papua New Guinea, brought up in Australia, and represented England at Test cricket via his Welsh parents

This is a list of Test cricketers who were born in a country that does not currently play Test cricket.

Updated 24 Oct 2023. Players in bold are still active.

Name	Place of birth	Country of birth	Country played for	Test career	Test caps
Shakeel Ahmed	Kuwait City	Kuwait	Pakistan	1998	1
Tanvir Ahmed	Kuwait City	Kuwait	Pakistan	2010–2013	5
Freddie Brown	Lima	Peru	England	1931–1953	22
Tom Campbell (Note: At the time they played Test cricket, the England team represented all of Great Britain)	Edinburgh	Scotland	South Africa	1910–1912	5
Donald Carr	Wiesbaden	Germany	England	1951–1952	2
Frederick Cook	Java	Dutch East Indies	South Africa	1896	1
Mike Denness	Bellshill	Scotland	England	1969–1975	28
Ted Dexter	Milan	Italy	England	1958–1968	62
Phil Edmonds	Lusaka	Northern Rhodesia	England	1975–1987	51
Ashok Gandotra	Rio de Janeiro	Brazil	India	1969	2
Gavin Hamilton (Note: At the time of their birth, the England team represented all of Great Britain)	Broxburn, West Lothian	Scotland	England (Note: Hamilton also played ODIs and T20Is for Scotland)	1999	1
George Headley	Colón	Panama	West Indies	1930–1954	22
**Moisés Henriques**	**Funchal**	**Portugal**	**Australia**	**2013–2016**	**4**
Molly Hide	Shanghai	China	England	1934–1954	15
Charles Hime	St. George's	Bermuda	South Africa	1896	1
David Ironside	Lourenço Marques	Mozambique	South Africa	1953–1954	3
Archie Jackson	Rutherglen	Scotland	Australia	1929–1931	8
Geraint Jones	Kundiawa	Papua New Guinea	England (Note: Jones also played 2 ODIs for Papua New Guinea)	2004–2006	34
Alec Kennedy	Edinburgh	Scotland	England	1922–1923	5
Amjad Khan	Copenhagen	Denmark	England	2009	1
David Larter	Inverness	Scotland	England	1962–1965	10
Jan Lumsden	Musselburgh	Scotland	Australia	1976–1978	6
Gregor MacGregor	Edinburgh	Scotland	England	1890–1893	8
Fish Markham	Mbabane	Swaziland	South Africa	1949	1
Meg Lanning	Singapore	Singapore	Australia	2013–2022	6
**Shan Masood**	**Kuwait City**	**Kuwait**	**Pakistan**	**2013–**	**10**
Jehan Mubarak	Washington, DC	United States	Sri Lanka	2002–2015	13
**Antum Naqvi**	**Brussels**	**Belgium**	**Zimbabwe**	**2026-**	1
Buster Nupen	Ålesund	Norway	South Africa	1921–1936	17
Steve O'Keefe	Penang	Malaysia	Australia	2014–2017	8
Henry Olonga	Lusaka	Zambia	Zimbabwe	1995–2002	30
Dipak Patel	Nairobi	Kenya Colony	New Zealand	1987–1997	37
Ian Peebles	Aberdeen	Scotland	England	1927–1931	13
Derek Pringle	Nairobi	Kenya	England	1982–1992	30
Neal Radford	Luanshya	Northern Rhodesia	England	1986–1988	
Lindsay Reeler	–	Northern Rhodesia	Australia	1984–1987	3
Dermot Reeve	Kowloon	Hong Kong	England	1992	3
Gordon Rowe	Glasgow	Scotland	New Zealand	1946	1
Eric Russell	Dumbarton	Scotland	England	1961–1967	10
**Nat Sciver-Brunt**	**Tokyo**	**Japan**	**England**	**2014-**	10
Lall Singh	Kuala Lumpur	British Malaya	India	1932	1
Peter Such	Helensburgh	Scotland	England	1993–1999	11
Paul Terry	Osnabrück	West Germany	England	1984	2
John Traicos	Zagazig	Egypt	South Africa, Zimbabwe	1970–1993	7
Qasim Umar	Nairobi	Kenya	Pakistan	1983–1986	26
Ken Weekes	Boston	United States	West Indies	1939	2
Dick Westcott	Lisbon	Portugal	South Africa	1954–1958	5
