= John Beck (cricketer) =

New Zealand cricketer (1934–2000)

- Beck in 1962

Personal information
- Full name: John Edward Francis Beck
- Born: 1 August 1934; Wellington, New Zealand
- Died: 24 April 2000 (aged 65); Wellington, New Zealand
- Batting: Left-handed
- Bowling: Slow left-arm orthodox
- Relatives: John Sigley (brother-in-law)

International information
- National side: New Zealand (1953–1956)
- Test debut (cap 65): 24 December 1953 v South Africa
- Last Test: 9 March 1956 v West Indies

Domestic team information
- Years: Team
- 1954/55–1961/62: Wellington

Career statistics
Competition	Test	First-class
Matches	8	41
Runs scored	394	1,508
Batting average	26.26	23.93
100s/50s	0/3	2/8
Top score	99	149
Balls bowled	–	46
Wickets	–	0
Bowling average	–	–
5 wickets in innings	–	–
10 wickets in match	–	–
Best bowling	–	–
Catches/stumpings	0/–	19/–
- Source: Cricinfo, 1 April 2017

John Edward Francis Beck (1 August 1934 – 24 April 2000) was a New Zealand cricketer who played in eight Test matches between 1953 and 1956. He played Plunket Shield cricket for Wellington from 1954–55 to 1961–62.

== International career ==
An attacking left-handed batsman and fine fieldsman, John Beck was selected for the tour to South Africa in 1953–54 at the age of 19 and before he had played a first-class match: chosen "on the basis of his schoolboy form and his raw promise". In the Third Test at Cape Town he was run out for 99 after he and John Reid had put on 174 for the fifth wicket, including 165 in the two hours between lunch and tea on the second day.

In New Zealand's first ever Test victory, against the West Indies at Auckland in 1955–56, Beck made 38 in the first innings, adding 104 for the fifth wicket with Reid, the highest partnership of the low-scoring match. That was his last Test match.

== Domestic career ==
Beck played for Wellington with mixed success from 1954–55 to 1961–62. His highest score was 149 against Canterbury in 1955–56. In 1961–62, he scored his only other century, 103 not out against Central Districts, when he set a Plunket Shield record sixth-wicket partnership of 187 (unbroken) with Les Butler.

Beck has been referred to as "one of the great mystery players of the age – he promised everything and achieved almost nothing." It was widely felt that he lacked the discipline to make the most of his talents.

== Sources ==
- Brooke, R. "Book Reviews", The Cricket Statistician, The Association of Cricket Statisticians and Historians: West Bridgford, Nottingham.
