= Bill Bell (cricketer) =

New Zealand cricketer (1931–2002)

- Bell in 1953

Personal information
- Born: 5 September 1931; Dunedin, Otago, New Zealand
- Died: 23 July 2002 (aged 70); Auckland, New Zealand
- Batting: Right-handed
- Bowling: Legbreak

International information
- National side: New Zealand (1954)
- Test debut (cap 66): 1 January 1954 v South Africa
- Last Test: 5 February 1954 v South Africa

Career statistics
Competition	Test	First-class
Matches	2	21
Runs scored	21	170
Batting average	–	10.00
100s/50s	0/0	0/0
Top score	21*	22
Balls bowled	491	3,451
Wickets	2	44
Bowling average	117.50	40.52
5 wickets in innings	0	0
10 wickets in match	0	0
Best bowling	1/54	4/31
Catches/stumpings	1/–	15/–
- Source: Cricinfo, 1 April 2017

William Bell (5 September 1931 – 23 July 2002) was a cricketer who played first-class cricket for Canterbury, Auckland and New Zealand from 1949 to 1959.

Bell attended Christchurch Boys' High School. A leg spin and googly bowler and lower-order batsman, Bell had played only five first-class games when he was picked for the New Zealand tour of South Africa in 1953-54 when regular spinner Alex Moir was left out of the touring party. An early return of four wickets against Eastern Province suggested he might do well, but in two Test match appearances, at Cape Town and Port Elizabeth, he took just two wickets, and was never picked again.
