= Alan Gilbertson =

New Zealand cricketer

Personal information
- Full name: Alan William Gilbertson
- Born: 6 December 1927; Invercargill, Southland, New Zealand
- Died: 7 May 2009 (aged 81); Invercargill, Southland, New Zealand
- Batting: Right-handed
- Bowling: Right-arm medium

Domestic team information
- Years: Team
- 1947/48–1966/67: Southland
- 1951/52–1953/54: Otago
- Source: CricInfo, 12 May 2016

Alan William Gilbertson (6 December 1927 – 7 May 2009) was a New Zealand cricketer. He played eight first-class matches for Otago between the 1951–52 and 1953–54 seasons.

Gilbertson was born at Invercargill in Southland in 1927, the son of James Gilbertson and nephew of John Gilbertson, both of whom had played first-class cricket for Southland. Like his father, he worked as a builder. He set a seventh wicket record partnership of 182 runs for Otago, batting with Bert Sutcliffe in 1952–53.
