= Gordon Leggat =

New Zealand cricketer and lawyer (1926–1973)

Personal information
- Full name: John Gordon Leggat
- Born: 27 May 1926; Wellington, New Zealand
- Died: 9 March 1973 (aged 46); Christchurch, New Zealand
- Batting: Right-handed
- Bowling: Right-arm leg-spin
- Role: Opening batsman
- Relatives: Ian Leggat (cousin)

International information
- National side: New Zealand (1952–1956)
- Test debut (cap 56): 15 February 1952 v West Indies
- Last Test: 3 February 1956 v West Indies

Career statistics
Competition	Test	First-class
Matches	9	57
Runs scored	351	3,634
Batting average	21.93	37.46
100s/50s	0/2	7/23
Top score	61	166
Balls bowled	–	29
Wickets	–	1
Bowling average	–	69.00
5 wickets in innings	–	0
10 wickets in match	–	0
Best bowling	–	1/1
Catches/stumpings	0/–	30/–
- Source: Cricinfo, 1 April 2017

John Gordon Leggat (27 May 1926 – 9 March 1973) was a New Zealand cricketer who played nine Test matches for New Zealand in the 1950s as an opening batsman. He was later a leading cricket administrator. His cousin Ian Leggat also played Test cricket for New Zealand.

== Early life and the law ==
Gordon Leggat was born in Wellington. He attended Christchurch Boys' High School, where in his final year he scored two double centuries against other schools. He went on to Canterbury College and became a lawyer.

Leggat was a senior partner in the Christchurch law firm of Weston, Ward and Lascelles. He was renowned for his work as a barrister, and defended in several murder cases as well as appearing in court in commercial and libel cases.

== Cricket career ==
Leggat played for Canterbury from 1944–45 to 1955–56. At the time of his appointment as captain of Canterbury in 1953 he was the only Canterbury player in the history of the Plunket Shield to have a batting average over 50.

Leggat failed to score in his first Test innings, against the touring West Indies team in 1951–52, but the next season he resisted the South African bowlers for several hours to score 22 and 47 (the top score, made in 190 minutes) in the First Test in Wellington.

He was not selected for the tour to South Africa in 1953–54, one of several players at the time who "paid the ultimate price for being overweight". The Christchurch daily The Press commented at the time that "there is no gainsaying the fact that his fielding is often well below standard". But brought in to reinforce the New Zealand batting when they played three matches in Australia on their way home from South Africa, he made 45, 67, 61, 121 not out (to take New Zealand to victory against South Australia when they needed 226 runs in two and a half hours), 11 and 34 against the state teams.

Leggat also toured Pakistan and India with the New Zealanders in 1955–56. He was third in both aggregates and averages on the tour, scoring 652 runs at 34.31. He played four Tests on the tour, making 37 and 50 not out in New Delhi, and 31 and 61 (his highest Test score) in Madras. He played his last Test against the touring West Indies in Dunedin later that season, making 3 and 17, and putting on 61 for the first wicket with Bert Sutcliffe in the second innings. It was also his last first-class match.

Dick Brittenden said Leggat "brought to the task of opening an innings extraordinary powers of concentration, tremendous endurance, and a highly-developed cricket sense", pointing out that Leggat had batted fourteen and a half hours in scoring 290 runs (110, 14 and 166) for Canterbury in the first three innings of the 1952–53 season. "His imperturbability under fire – either from bowlers or spectators – has become almost legendary," said The Press in 1953.

== Administration ==
Leggat was a national selector from 1959 to 1965, and chairman of the Board of Control of the New Zealand Cricket Council from 1966 until he died suddenly in 1973. He managed the tour to South Africa in 1961–62, on which New Zealand won its first Test victories outside New Zealand.

Leggat was also chairman of the New Zealand Hockey Association for nine years.

== Death ==
Leggat died suddenly in Christchurch in March 1973, aged 46. He left a widow and two children.
