= Robin Currie =

New Zealand cricket umpire

Personal information
- Full name: Robin G Currie

Umpiring information
- Tests umpired: 2 (1953–1955)
- Source: Cricinfo, 5 July 2013

Robin Currie was a New Zealand former cricket umpire. He stood in two Test matches between 1953 and 1955.

== See also ==
- List of Test cricket umpires
- South African cricket team in New Zealand in 1952–53
- English cricket team in New Zealand in 1954–55
