= Ted Meuli =

New Zealand cricketer

- Meuli in 1953

Personal information
- Full name: Edgar Milton Meuli
- Born: 20 February 1926; Hāwera, Taranaki, New Zealand
- Died: 15 April 2007 (aged 81); Red Beach, Auckland, New Zealand
- Batting: Right-handed
- Bowling: Right-arm leg-spin

International information
- National side: New Zealand (1953)
- Test debut (cap 59): 6 March 1953 v South Africa

Domestic team information
- Years: Team
- 1945/46: Auckland
- 1950/51–1959/60: Central Districts

Career statistics
Competition	Test	First-class
Matches	1	42
Runs scored	38	1,914
Batting average	19.00	26.21
100s/50s	0/0	2/6
Top score	23	154
Balls bowled	–	647
Wickets	–	11
Bowling average	–	29.90
5 wickets in innings	–	1
10 wickets in match	–	0
Best bowling	–	6/67
Catches/stumpings	0/–	9/–
- Source: Cricinfo, 1 April 2017

Edgar Milton Meuli (20 February 1926 – 15 April 2007) was a New Zealand cricketer who played in one Test match in 1953. He played 42 matches of first-class cricket in New Zealand between 1945 and 1959.

== Cricket career ==
Ted Meuli was born in Hāwera and raised in New Plymouth where he attended New Plymouth Boys' High School, captaining the school's First XI. He was a right-handed batsman and occasional leg-spin bowler who made his first-class debut in 1945–46, playing three games for Auckland. His next first-class matches were in 1950–51 for Central Districts when they made their first appearance in the Plunket Shield. He spent the rest of his first-class career, which finished in 1959–60, with Central Districts. He also played for Taranaki in the non-first-class Hawke Cup from 1946–47 to 1968–69.

In the Plunket Shield in 1952–53 he made 317 runs at 52.83, including 154 against Auckland, batting at number three, out of a team total of 319 in a low-scoring match that Central Districts won by an innings. A week earlier he had taken 6 for 67 against Otago.

He was selected in the team for the First Test against South Africa in Wellington in 1952–53, making 15 and 23 batting in the middle order, and not bowling, although South Africa's innings lasted 174 overs. He was one of five players who lost their places for the Second Test; along with Eric Fisher, the Wellington Test was his sole appearance for New Zealand.

Meuli hit one more century, in 1956–57 against Northern Districts, once again in a low-scoring match that Central Districts won by an innings. It was the first century scored against Northern Districts, who were playing their first season in the Plunket Shield.

In 1956 a photo of him batting on a New Plymouth pitch of latex-cement rubber was published in the annual report of the Natural Rubber Development Board in England – he was called "Mr Ted Bulei".

== Later life ==
Meuli spent his working life as a school teacher in New Plymouth. He died aged 81 in April 2007, survived by Nerida, his wife of 53 years, and their three sons.

== See also ==
- One-Test wonder
- Moturoa AFC
