= 1949 English cricket season =

The 1949 English cricket season saw the 1949 County Championship being shared for the first time since the official competition began in 1890. New Zealand toured England to compete in a test series where all four matches were drawn.

== Honours ==
- County Championship - Middlesex, Yorkshire (shared title)
- Minor Counties Championship – Lancashire II
- Wisden – Trevor Bailey, Roly Jenkins, John Langridge, Reg Simpson, Bert Sutcliffe

== Test series ==
=== New Zealand tour ===
England and New Zealand drew all four Test matches.

== Leading batsmen ==
1949 English cricket season – leading batsmen by average
Name	Innings	Runs	Highest	Average	100s
Joe Hardstaff junior	40	2251	162*	72.61	8
Len Hutton	56	3429	269*	68.58	12
Peter May	12	695	175	63.18	1
Reg Simpson	46	2525	238	63.12	6
Martin Donnelly	45	2287	206	61.81	5
John Thompson	12	609	103	60.90	2

1949 English cricket season – leading batsmen by aggregate
Name	Innings	Runs	Highest	Average	100s
Len Hutton	56	3429	269*	68.58	12
John Langridge	53	2914	234*	60.70	12
Bert Sutcliffe	49	2627	243	59.70	7
Denis Compton	56	2530	182	48.65	9
Reg Simpson	46	2525	238	63.12	6
Laurie Fishlock	56	2426	210	45.77	7

== Leading bowlers ==
1949 English cricket season – leading bowlers by average
Name	Balls	Maidens	Runs	Wickets	Average
Ron Aspinall	799	32	289	30	9.63
Tom Goddard	7124	326	3069	160	19.18
Abdul Hafeez Kardar	5537	366	1777	92	19.31
Dick Howorth	6682	386	2278	117	19.47
Horace Hazell	5539	303	2065	106	19.48

1949 English cricket season – leading bowlers by aggregate
Name	Balls	Maidens	Runs	Wickets	Average
Roly Jenkins	6877	187	3879	183	21.19
Eric Hollies	9766	584	3413	166	20.56
Tom Goddard	7124	326	3069	160	19.18
Jack Young	8721	526	2948	150	19.65
Jack Walsh	6367	135	3800	132	28.78

== Annual reviews ==
- Playfair Cricket Annual 1950
- Wisden Cricketers' Almanack 1950
