= Frederick Cook (cricketer) =

South African cricketer

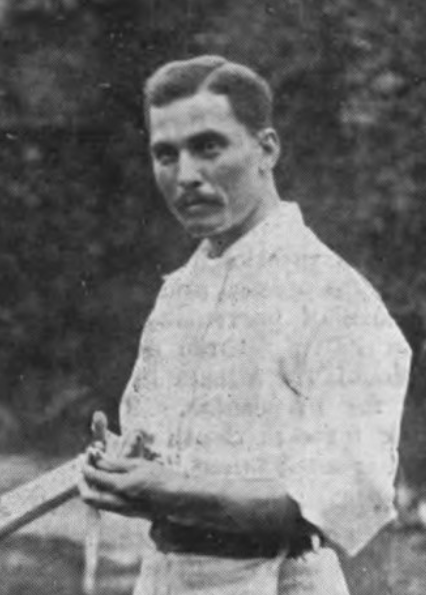

Personal information
- Full name: Frederick James Cook
- Born: 31 January 1870; Java, Dutch East Indies
- Died: 30 November 1915 (aged 45); Cape Helles, Gallipoli, Ottoman Turkey
- Batting: Right-handed

International information
- National side: South Africa
- Only Test (cap 24): 13 February 1896 v England

Domestic team information
- Years: Team
- 1893/94–1904/05: Eastern Province

Career statistics
Competition	Test	First-class
Matches	1	6
Runs scored	7	172
Batting average	3.50	17.19
100s/50s	0/0	0/1
Top score	7	59
Catches/stumpings	0/–	1/–
- Source: Cricinfo, 13 November 2022

Frederick James Cook (31 January 1870 – 30 November 1915) was a South African cricketer who played in one Test match in 1896.

Cook was a right-handed batsman who played for Eastern Province from the 1893–94 season to 1904–05. He made his highest score in March 1894 in his first-ever first-class innings, when he captained Eastern Province and scored 59 and 28.

In 1895–96, he played in the first Test match between South Africa and the MCC side captained by Lord Hawke. Batting at number nine, he made 7 out of a total of 93 in the first innings and failed to score in the second innings, when South Africa were bowled out for 30, with George Lohmann taking eight wickets for seven runs. In this second innings, Cook was the first dismissal in a Lohmann hat-trick which finished the match.

At the outbreak of World War I, Cook was commissioned in the Border Regiment and quickly promoted to captain. He was sent to Gallipoli, where he was attached to the 1/4th Battalion (Queen's Edinburgh Rifles) of the Royal Scots. He was killed in action on 30 November 1915.

== See also ==
- List of Test cricketers born in non-Test playing nations
