= David Ironside =

South African cricketer (1925–2005)

Personal information
- Full name: David Ernest James Ironside
- Born: 2 May 1925; Lourenco Marques, Mozambique
- Died: 21 August 2005 (aged 80); Birmingham, England
- Batting: Right-handed
- Bowling: Right-arm fast-medium

International information
- National side: South Africa
- Test debut: 24 December 1953 v New Zealand
- Last Test: 29 January 1954 v New Zealand

Domestic team information
- Years: Team
- 1947/48–1955/56: Transvaal

Career statistics
Competition	Test	First-class
Matches	3	31
Runs scored	37	135
Batting average	18.50	6.42
100s/50s	0/0	0/0
Top score	13	16*
Balls bowled	986	8,423
Wickets	15	130
Bowling average	18.33	21.13
5 wickets in innings	1	7
10 wickets in match	0	0
Best bowling	5/51	7/36
Catches/stumpings	1/–	11/–
- Source: Cricinfo, 15 November 2022

David Ernest James Ironside (2 May 1925 – 21 August 2005) was a South African cricketer who played in three Test matches, all against New Zealand in South Africa in 1953–54. On his debut, he took five wickets in the first innings against New Zealand in Johannesburg in 1953.

An accurate right-arm swing bowler, Ironside played for Transvaal from 1947–48 to 1955–56. His best figures were 7 for 36 against Border in 1952–53.

Ironside worked in Johannesburg as an accountant before moving to England to live with his daughter.

== See also ==
- List of South Africa cricketers who have taken five-wicket hauls on Test debut
- List of Test cricketers born in non-Test playing nations
