= Ian Colquhoun =

New Zealand cricketer

Ian Colquhoun QSM

Personal information
- Full name: Ian Alexander Colquhoun
- Born: 8 July 1924; Wellington, New Zealand
- Died: 25 February 2005 (aged 80); Paraparaumu Beach, New Zealand
- Batting: Right-handed
- Role: Wicket-keeper

International information
- National side: New Zealand (1955)
- Test debut (cap 68): 11 March 1955 v England
- Last Test: 25 March 1955 v England

Career statistics
Competition	Test	First-class
Matches	2	57
Runs scored	1	768
Batting average	0.50	14.76
100s/50s	0/0	0/0
Top score	1*	44*
Catches/stumpings	4/0	108/28
- Source: Cricinfo, 1 April 2017

Ian Alexander Colquhoun QSM (8 June 1924 – 25 February 2005) was a New Zealand cricketer who played two Test matches for his country in the 1950s.

== Early life and family ==
Born in Wellington on 8 June 1924, Colquhoun was the son of Gladys and Campbell Alexander Colquhoun. He was educated at Rongotai College, and then studied at Wellington and Dunedin Teachers' Colleges.

In 1949, Colquhoun married Betty Ellen Petley.

== Career ==
Colquhoun was a wicketkeeper and a useful lower-order right-handed batsman who came late to first-class cricket, not making his debut for Central Districts until he was 29. A year later, he was in the New Zealand Test team for the two matches against Len Hutton's 1954–55 England team, fresh from retaining the Ashes. England won both matches fairly comfortably and in the second, at Auckland, New Zealand were dismissed for 26, which remains the lowest-ever total by a Test match side. Colquhoun's own distinction in this second match was to be dismissed first ball in each innings by Bob Appleyard; each time, Alex Moir, who also failed to score in either innings, prevented the hat-trick.

Colquhoun continued to keep wicket for Central Districts until 1963–64, when he retired. He also played for Manawatu in the Hawke Cup from 1952 to 1963.

Colquhoun was a teacher at Palmerston North Boys' High School, and also a rugby triallist for the All Blacks. In the 1985 New Year Honours, he was awarded the Queen's Service Medal for public services.
