= Dick Westcott =

South African cricketer (1927–2013)

Personal information
- Full name: Richard John Westcott
- Born: 19 September 1927; Carcavelos, Lisbon, Portugal
- Died: 16 January 2013 (aged 85); Hermanus, Western Cape, South Africa
- Batting: Right-handed
- Bowling: Right-arm medium
- Role: Batsman

International information
- National side: South Africa
- Test debut (cap 191): 1 January 1954 v New Zealand
- Last Test: 24 January 1958 v Australia

Career statistics
Competition	Test	First-class
Matches	5	51
Runs scored	166	3,225
Batting average	18.44	36.23
100s/50s	0/1	4/23
Top score	62	140
Balls bowled	32	746
Wickets	0	10
Bowling average	–	31.40
5 wickets in innings	–	0
10 wickets in match	–	0
Best bowling	–	3/44
Catches/stumpings	0/–	26/–
- Source: ESPNcricinfo, 22 April 2017

Richard John Westcott (19 September 1927 – 16 January 2013) was a South African cricketer who played in five Tests from 1954 to 1958. He was the first Test cricketer to have been born in Portugal. Australian Moises Henriques is the only other Portuguese-born Test cricketer.

== Career ==
Westcott was an adventurous right-handed opening batsman and a capable but under-used right-arm medium pace bowler who played for Western Province throughout the 1950s. He scored a century in his third match in 1950–51. Early in his career he was involved in a car crash which caused severe damage to his left arm, but he continued to play at a high standard.

In 1953–54, he scored 82 and 71 for Western Province against the New Zealand touring side, and he was called into the South Africa side for the third Test match at Newlands, Cape Town. New Zealand posted their then-highest score of 505 in this match and South Africa were forced to follow on. Westcott made 62 as the home side saved the match fairly comfortably. In the next game, Westcott opened with Jackie McGlew and scored 43 as the pair put on 104 for the first wicket. He retained his place for the final Test.

Though Westcott retained his form in subsequent seasons, he was not picked for the away and home Test series against England in 1955 and 1956–57. In 1957–58 he hit 101 against Border and 140 against Eastern Province, and was recalled for the second and third Tests against the Australians. The recall was not a success: he scored 18 runs in three innings, all 18 coming in the second innings of the second Test, when he was the only South African to reach double figures apart from Trevor Goddard, who carried his bat for 56 out of a total of 99 all out.

Westcott continued to appear for Western Province, playing his last match in 1961–62.

== Personal life ==
Westcott was born in Carcavelos, Lisbon, Portugal, to Jack and Kathleen Westcott. He was educated at Cape Town schools Western Province Preparatory School and Bishops.

Westcott and his brother Noel owned a transport company in South Africa that at one stage operated two ships, principally transporting cars and beef. They also owned a liquor manufacturing business in Botswana and a portable toilet hire business.

Westcott died in Hermanus on 16 January 2013, at the age of 85.

== See also ==
- List of Test cricketers born in non-Test playing nations
