= Eric Fisher (cricketer) =

New Zealand cricketer (1924–1996)

- Fisher during the 1950s

Personal information
- Full name: Frederick Eric Fisher
- Born: 28 July 1924; Johnsonville, Wellington, New Zealand
- Died: 19 June 1996 (aged 71); Palmerston North, Manawatu, New Zealand
- Batting: Right-handed
- Bowling: Left-arm medium

International information
- National side: New Zealand (1953)
- Only Test (cap 58): 6 March 1953 v South Africa

Domestic team information
- Years: Team
- 1951/52–1953/54: Wellington
- 1954/55: Central Districts

Career statistics
Competition	Test	First-class
Matches	1	15
Runs scored	23	485
Batting average	11.50	21.08
100s/50s	0/0	0/2
Top score	14	68
Balls bowled	204	3168
Wickets	1	53
Bowling average	78.00	23.24
5 wickets in innings	0	2
10 wickets in match	0	2
Best bowling	1/78	8/34
Catches/stumpings	0/–	9/–
- Source: Cricinfo, 1 April 2017

Frederick Eric Fisher (28 July 1924 – 19 June 1996) was a New Zealand cricketer who played in one Test match in 1953. A left-arm medium-pace bowler and useful lower-order right-handed batsman, he played first-class cricket in New Zealand from 1951–52 to 1954–55.

== Cricket career ==
Fisher was born in the northern Wellington suburb of Johnsonville in 1924. He played for Wellington from 1951–52 to 1953–54, and Central Districts in 1954–55. In the four matches of the Plunket Shield in 1952–53 he made 138 runs at 27.60 and took 29 wickets at 10.20. His best performances during the season were 4 for 26 and 7 for 48 against Auckland (as well as scoring 68 and 19 not out), and 8 for 34 and 3 for 31 against Canterbury (match figures of 57.2–30–65–11).

After his success in that season's Plunket Shield, Fisher was selected to open the bowling in the First Test against the visiting South Africans in March 1953, but he took only one wicket in an innings defeat and was never selected again. According to Richard Boock in his biography of Bert Sutcliffe, Fisher was one of several players at the time who "paid the ultimate price for being overweight". The Cricket Almanack of New Zealand selected him as its Bowler of the Year in its 1953 edition, declaring that he was "without doubt the pre-eminent bowler in New Zealand cricket during the 1952–53 season". The Almanack said he was unlucky during his Test match in that his captain asked him to bowl on or outside the off-stump, when he had achieved his success in the Plunket Shield with a leg-stump line and an attacking field of close catchers.

Fisher left Wellington to take up a position as professional player-coach with the Napier Marist Club in October 1954. He played in the Hawke Cup from 1955–56 to 1966–67, representing successively Hawke's Bay, Poverty Bay and Southern Hawke's Bay. He also played for Rochdale in the Central Lancashire League. He died at Palmerston North in Manawatu in 1996, aged 71.

== See also ==
- One-Test wonder
