= David Drew (umpire) =

South African cricket umpire

Personal information
- Full name: David Thomas Drew
- Born: 30 March 1919; Durban, South Africa
- Died: 12 May 1976 (aged 57); Durban, South Africa

Umpiring information
- Tests umpired: 3 (1950–1954)
- Source: Cricinfo, 5 July 2013

David Drew (30 March 1919 – 12 May 1976) was a South African cricket umpire. He stood in three Test matches between 1950 and 1954.

== See also ==
- List of Test cricket umpires
