= Frank Mooney =

New Zealand cricketer

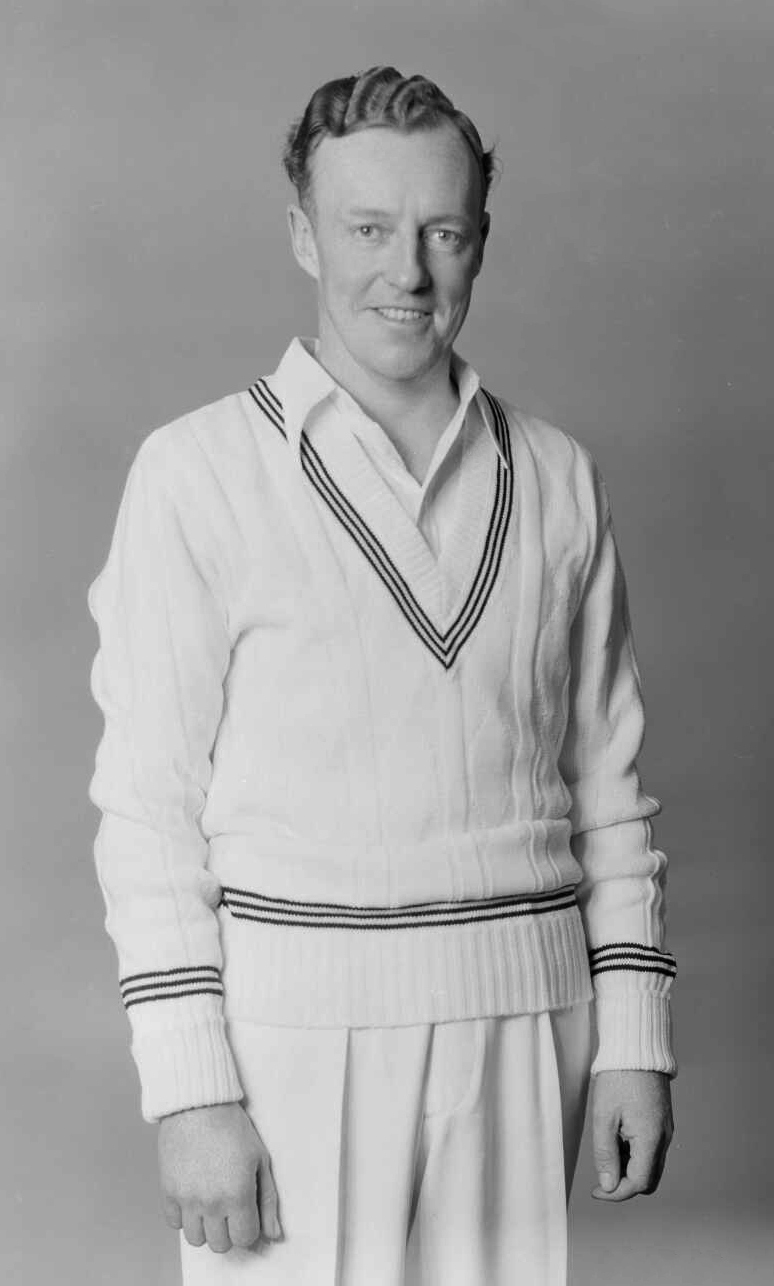
- Mooney in 1957

Personal information
- Born: 26 May 1921; Wellington, New Zealand
- Died: 8 March 2004 (aged 82); Wellington, New Zealand
- Nickname: Starlight
- Batting: Right-handed
- Role: Wicket-keeper

International information
- National side: New Zealand (1949–1954)
- Test debut (cap 47): 11 June 1949 v England
- Last Test: 5 February 1954 v South Africa

Career statistics
Competition	Test	First-class
Matches	14	91
Runs scored	343	3143
Batting average	17.14	23.11
100s/50s	0/0	2/12
Top score	46	180
Balls bowled	8	14
Wickets	–	–
Bowling average	–	–
5 wickets in innings	–	–
10 wickets in match	–	–
Best bowling	–	–
Catches/stumpings	22/8	168/54
- Source: Cricinfo, 1 April 2017

Francis Leonard Hugh Mooney (26 May 1921 – 8 March 2004) was a New Zealand cricketer who played in 14 Test matches as a batsman and wicket-keeper between 1949 and 1954.

== Biography ==
He played for Wellington from 1941–42 to 1954–55, and toured England in 1949 and South Africa in 1953–54.

He was a company secretary by profession and after retiring from cricket he was a selector for the national team.
