= Matt Poore =

New Zealand cricketer (1930–2020)

- Poore in 1953–54

Personal information
- Full name: Matt Beresford Poore
- Born: 1 June 1930; Christchurch, New Zealand
- Died: 11 June 2020 (aged 90); North Shore, Auckland, New Zealand
- Batting: Right-handed
- Bowling: Right-arm offbreak

International information
- National side: New Zealand (1953–1956)
- Test debut (cap 63): 13 March 1953 v South Africa
- Last Test: 6 January 1956 v India

Domestic team information
- Years: Team
- 1950/51–1961/62: Canterbury

Career statistics
Competition	Test	First-class
Matches	14	61
Runs scored	355	2,336
Batting average	15.43	23.12
100s/50s	0/0	2/11
Top score	45	142
Balls bowled	788	5,134
Wickets	9	68
Bowling average	40.77	26.66
5 wickets in innings	0	1
10 wickets in match	0	0
Best bowling	2/28	5/27
Catches/stumpings	1/–	14/–
- Source: Cricinfo, 1 April 2017

Matt Beresford Poore (1 June 1930 – 11 June 2020) was a New Zealand cricketer who played 14 Test matches for New Zealand in the 1950s. He was born in Christchurch.

== Domestic career ==
A right-handed middle order batsman and handy off-spin bowler, Poore played for Canterbury from 1950–51 to 1957–58, then returned for three matches in 1961–62. His highest score was 142 opening the batting against Central Districts in 1954–55, a match in which the next highest score was 55. It was the highest score in the Plunket Shield in the 1954–55 season. His other century was 103, opening the batting against Auckland in 1956-57 after taking 4 for 72 (figures of 47.2–22–72–4) in the first innings. His best bowling was 5 for 27 against Indian Universities in the final match of the 1955-56 tour.

Commenting on Poore's innings of 70 in his second match for Canterbury in 1950–51, Dick Brittenden wrote: "His graceful driving and easy footwork marked him out as a future New Zealand batsman, and he became one, only to disappoint his admirers regularly, by looking the best batsman in the country and getting out for small scores inexplicably and far too frequently."

== International career ==
Poore made his Test debut in March 1953 against South Africa at Auckland. He made 170 runs in the five-Test series in South Africa in 1953–54. He also toured Pakistan and India in 1955–56, playing in seven of the eight Tests, but scoring only 131 runs at 11.90 and taking 4 wickets at 64.25.

His best Test performances came in his first Test, when he made 45 and 8 not out and took 2 for 28 and 2 for 43. Although he failed to make a Test half-century in his 14 matches – and in fact holds the record for the longest Test career without a half-century or a three-wicket haul – he made two hundreds in first-class cricket.

Like most of the New Zealand team, Poore suffered from illness during the tour of Pakistan and India. During one game, affected by his gastric medication, he went to sleep standing up in the field. In Bangalore he was bitten by a stray dog that he was removing from the field, and had to have antibiotic injections in his stomach for the next two weeks, most of them administered by his teammates in the absence of medical assistance.

== Personal life ==
Poore and his wife Rae were married for 63 years. He died at their retirement village in North Shore, Auckland, on 11 June 2020.
