= Bert Sutcliffe =

New Zealand cricketer (1923–2001)

Bert Sutcliffe MBE
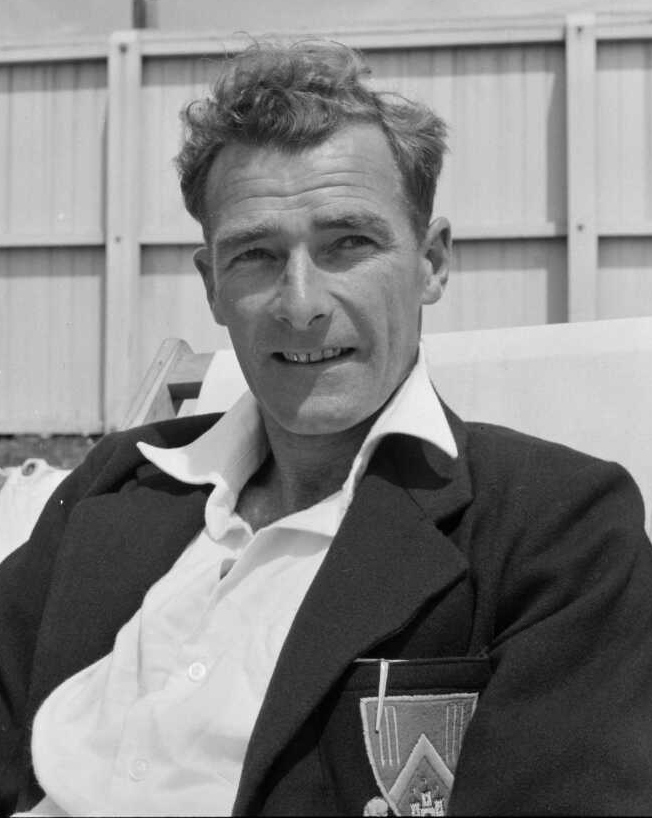
- Sutcliffe in 1958

Personal information
- Full name: Bert Sutcliffe
- Born: 17 November 1923; Ponsonby, Auckland, New Zealand
- Died: 20 April 2001 (aged 77); Auckland, New Zealand
- Nickname: Suttie
- Batting: Left-handed
- Bowling: Slow left-arm orthodox

International information
- National side: New Zealand (1947–1965)
- Test debut (cap 44): 21 March 1947 v England
- Last Test: 27 May 1965 v England

Career statistics
Competition	Test	First-class
Matches	42	233
Runs scored	2,727	17,447
Batting average	40.10	47.41
100s/50s	5/15	44/83
Top score	230*	385
Balls bowled	538	5,978
Wickets	4	86
Bowling average	86.00	38.05
5 wickets in innings	0	2
10 wickets in match	0	0
Best bowling	2/38	5/19
Catches/stumpings	20/–	160/1
- Source: Cricinfo, 1 April 2017

Bert Sutcliffe MBE (17 November 1923 – 20 April 2001) was a New Zealand Test cricketer. Sutcliffe was a successful left-hand batsman. His batting achievements on tour in England in 1949, which included four fifties and a century in the Tests, earned him the accolade of being one of Wisden's Five Cricketers of the Year. He captained New Zealand in four Tests in the early 1950s, losing three of them and drawing the other. None of Sutcliffe's 42 Tests resulted in a New Zealand victory. In 1949 Sutcliffe was named the inaugural New Zealand Sportsman of the Year, and in 2000 was named as New Zealand champion sportsperson of the decade for the 1940s.

== Early life ==
Sutcliffe was born in the Auckland suburb of Ponsonby to parents who had migrated from Lancashire in 1921. He was a brilliant schoolboy cricketer at Takapuna Grammar School, and spent two years at teacher training college before joining the army in 1944. He scored heavily in matches he was able to play while serving with New Zealand forces in Egypt and Italy at the end of the Second World War. He served in the cypher section of the army signals unit in Japan in 1946, where he played cricket in Chōfu.

Sutcliffe's first-class career did not get under way until he returned to New Zealand in 1946 from service in Japan after the war. He first represented Auckland in 1941–42, while still at school, and played for the province until 1949–50, when he moved to Dunedin to take up a coaching position. From then on he played for the Otago team. After the war he worked as a physical exercise instructor.

== Cricket career ==
Sutcliffe established himself in his first international match when he scored 197 and 128 in the same match for Otago against a touring Marylebone Cricket Club (MCC) team at Dunedin in March 1947. In the first innings he brought up his century with a six. He made his Test debut a few days later, scoring 58 in New Zealand's only innings and adding 133 for the first wicket with Walter Hadlee. In consecutive seasons of first-class cricket in New Zealand he made 722 runs at an average of 103.14 in 1946–47 with three centuries, 911 runs at 111.22 in 1947–48 with four centuries, and 511 runs at 85.16 in 1948–49 with three centuries.

On the 1949 tour of England he was asked to open the batting, having previously batted at number 5 for Auckland, and did better than he expected. He notably scored 243 and 100 not out in the match against Essex at Southend. In the third test in Manchester he scored 101, his first test century. His captain, Hadlee, thought he was not in top form but played soundly and responsibly nonetheless. He went on to total 2,627 first-class runs on the tour at an average of 59.70. This made him second only to Sir Donald Bradman for the record of most runs made on a tour of England.

He made the first of two triple-hundreds in his career against Auckland in 1949–50 for Otago, scoring 355. When England toured New Zealand in 1951 Sutcliffe scored his second test century of 116 in the first test in Christchurch. In a match against Canterbury in the 1952–53 season he made his highest ever first-class score of 385. The score of 385 stood as the record highest score by a left-handed batsman until 1994, when Brian Lara hit 501.

Selected for the 1953–54 tour of South Africa, Sutcliffe is especially noted for an innings of 80 not out against South Africa in Johannesburg on Boxing Day 1953. New Zealand's batsmen were routed by South African fast bowler Neil Adcock on a green wicket. Sutcliffe was hit on the head by Adcock and, having left the field to receive hospital treatment, returned to the crease swathed in bandages. He took on the bowling, hitting a number of sixes, until the ninth wicket fell. The New Zealand fast bowler Bob Blair, the next man in, was understood to be back at the team hotel distraught as his fiancee had been killed in the Tangiwai disaster two days earlier. Sutcliffe started to walk off only to see Blair walk out. Despite the presence of 23,000 fans, silence enveloped the ground. 33 runs were added in 10 minutes before Blair was out. New Zealand lost the Test match by a considerable margin. Notwithstanding this, the noted New Zealand cricket writer Dick Brittenden said: "It was a great and glorious victory, a story every New Zealand boy should learn at his mother's knee".

Playing for New Zealand against India at New Delhi in 1955–56 tour, he scored 230 not out, which was then a Test record for New Zealand. The test match was drawn. In an earlier test he scored a century as well of 137 not out in New Zealand's second innings.

In 1962 his sporting goods store in Dunedin failed and he accepted a sales position in Hamilton, in the North Island. He played for Northern Districts from 1962–63 to 1965–66.

== Retirement ==
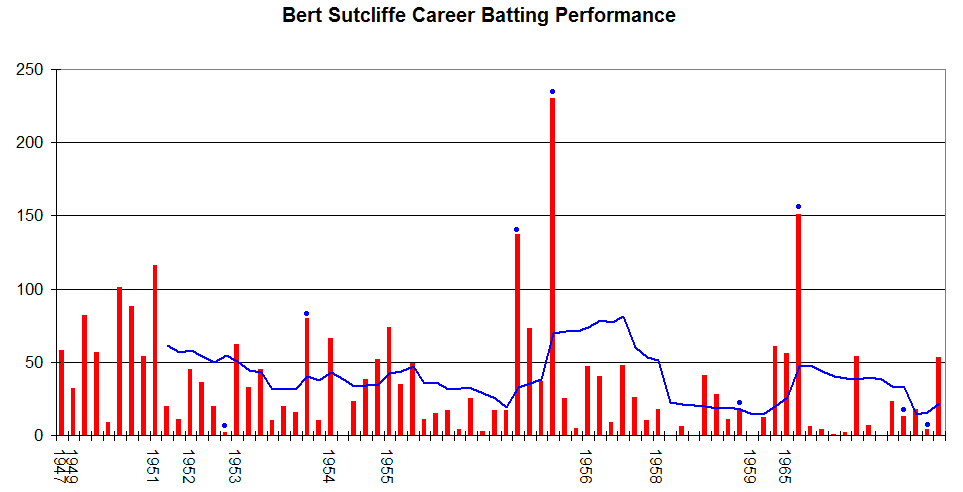
Bert Sutcliffe's career performance graph.

Sutcliffe wrote his memoirs, Between Overs: Memoirs of a Cricketing Kiwi, in 1963. After he retired from cricket he became a coach. He was employed as a brand ambassador for Rothmans cigarettes.

In the 1985 New Year Honours, Sutcliffe was appointed a Member of the Order of the British Empire, for services to cricket.

== Death and legacy ==
Sutcliffe died in Auckland on 20 April 2001, aged 77, from emphysema. Just prior to his death he recorded footage of interviews with broadcaster and former cricketer Jeremy Coney for the documentary series The Mantis and the Cricket: Tales from the Tours. The series recounted the history of New Zealand cricket and was first broadcast after Sutcliffe had died.

In 2010 The Last Everyday Hero: The Bert Sutcliffe Story, a biography by Richard Boock, was published. The Cricket Society chose it as its cricket book of the year in 2011.

New Zealand Cricket awards the Bert Sutcliffe Medal annually to those it deems have made outstanding service to cricket in New Zealand over a lifetime.

Sutcliffe was named in the First XI of the newly established NZC Hall of Fame in December 2024 where he was described as "the ultimate cricketing hero of countless New Zealand youngsters."

== Style and technique ==
Sutcliffe is described in Barclays World of Cricket as one of New Zealand's "most productive and cultured batsmen". He is also noted to be moving back and across the stumps more than many batsmen in his time like Geoffrey Boycott, which lays a foundation to more modern and contemporary batsmen since the 80's to deal with fast bowlers.

== Footnotes ==
Sporting positions
Preceded by Walter Hadlee	New Zealand national cricket captain 1951/52	Succeeded by Merv Wallace
