= 2006 in New Zealand =

- Decades: 1980s; 1990s; 2000s; 2010s; 2020s
- See also: History of New Zealand; List of years in New Zealand; Timeline of New Zealand history

The following lists events that happened during 2006 in New Zealand.

== Population ==
- Estimated population as of 31 December: 4,209,100
- Increase since 31 December 2005: 48,200 (1.16%)
- Males per 100 Females: 95.8

== Incumbents ==
=== Regal and viceregal ===
- Head of State – Elizabeth II
- Governor-General – Dame Silvia Cartwright, succeeded by Anand Satyanand
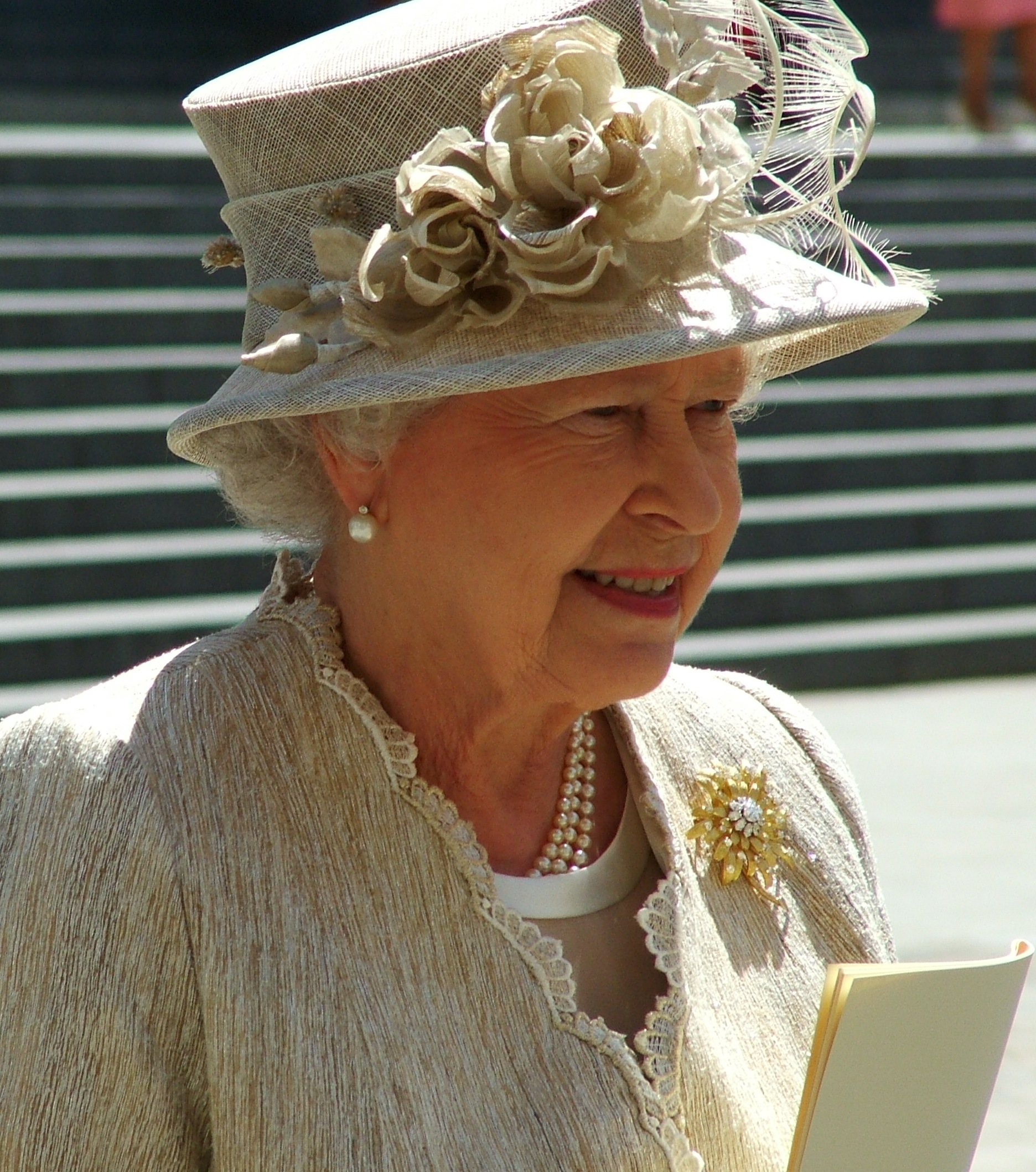
Elizabeth II

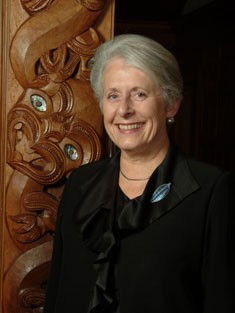
Dame Silva Cartwright

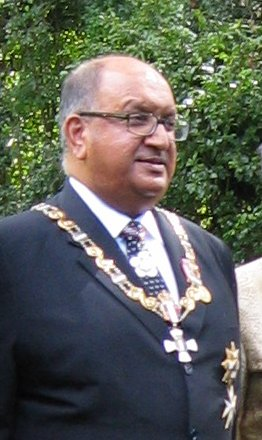
Anand Satyanand

=== Government ===
The 48th New Zealand Parliament continued. Government was a coalition between Labour and the Progressives, with United Future and New Zealand First supporting supply votes. The leaders of the two support parties are ministers outside Cabinet.

- Speaker of the House – Margaret Wilson (Labour)
- Prime Minister – Helen Clark (Labour)
- Deputy Prime Minister – Michael Cullen (Labour)
- Minister of Finance – Michael Cullen (Labour)

Non-Labour ministers

- Jim Anderton (Progressives) (within Cabinet)
- Winston Peters (New Zealand First) – Minister of Foreign Affairs, Racing and Associate Minister of Senior Citizens (outside Cabinet)
- Peter Dunne (United Future), Minister of Revenue and Associate Minister of Health (outside Cabinet)
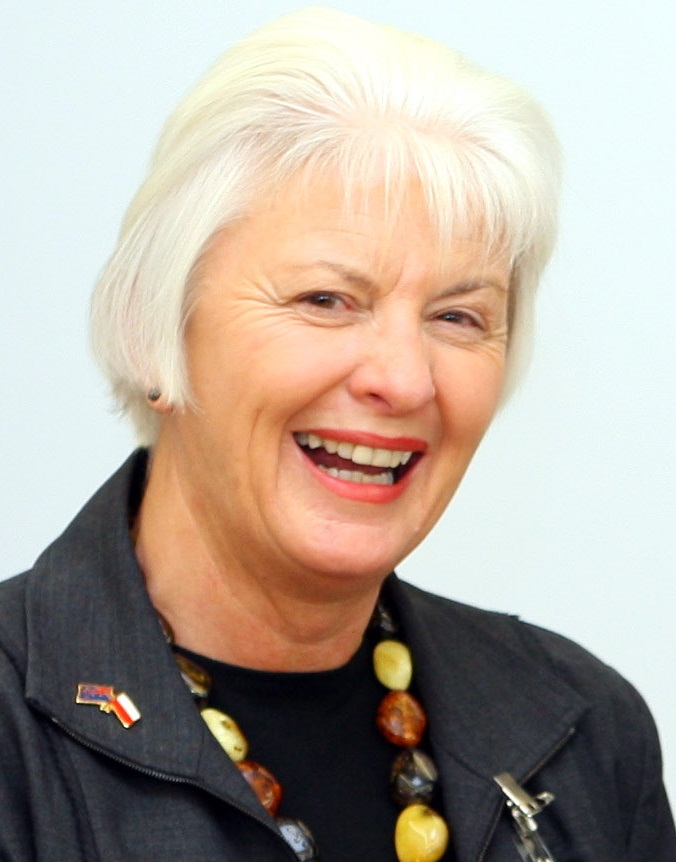
Margaret Wilson

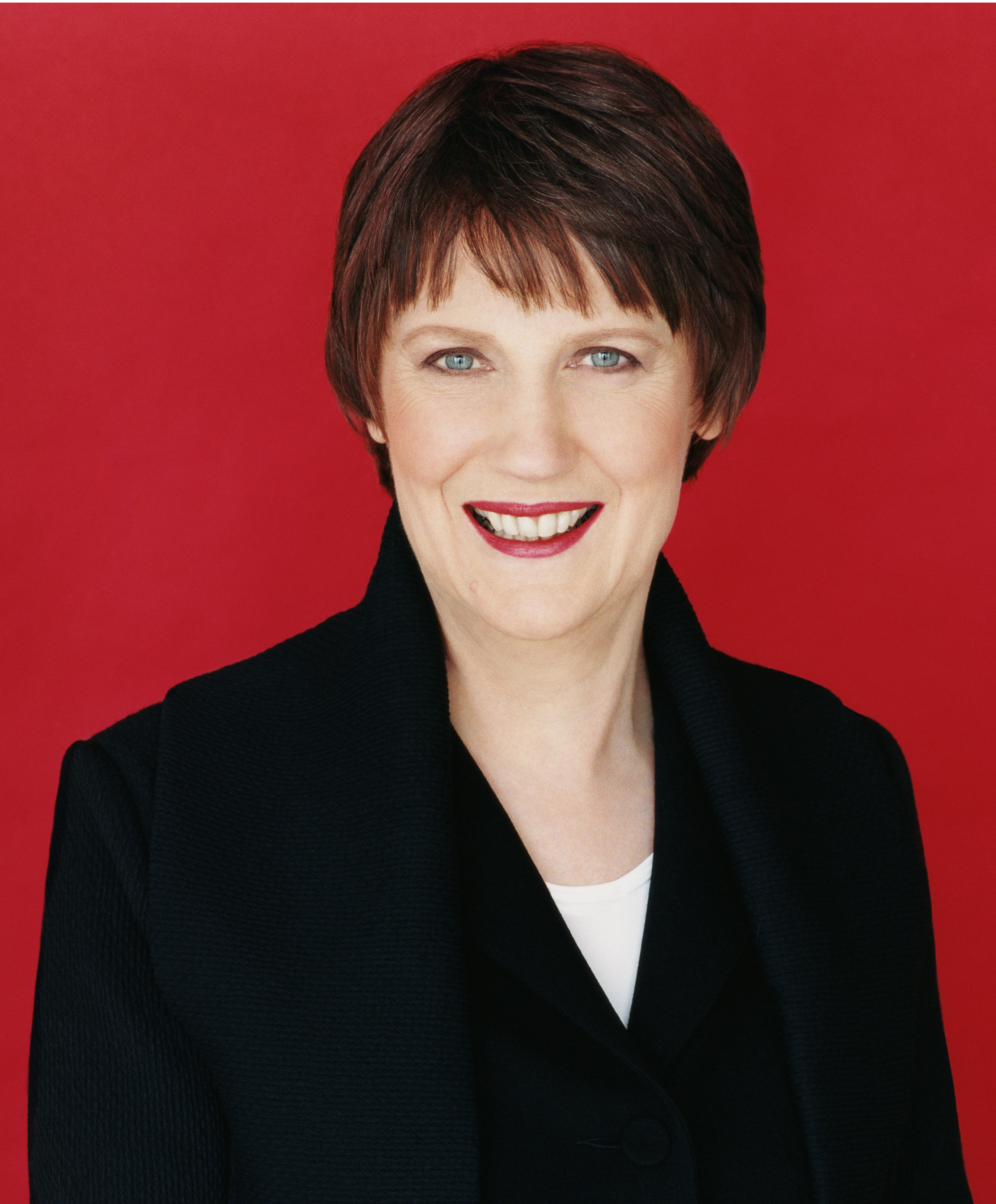
Helen Clark

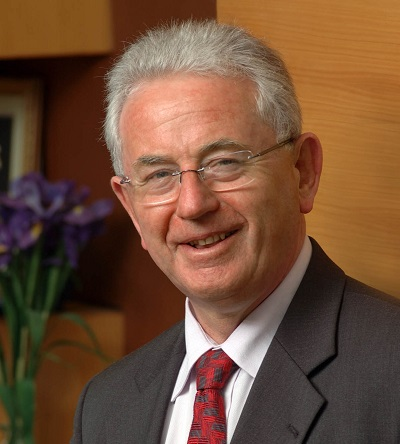
Michael Cullen

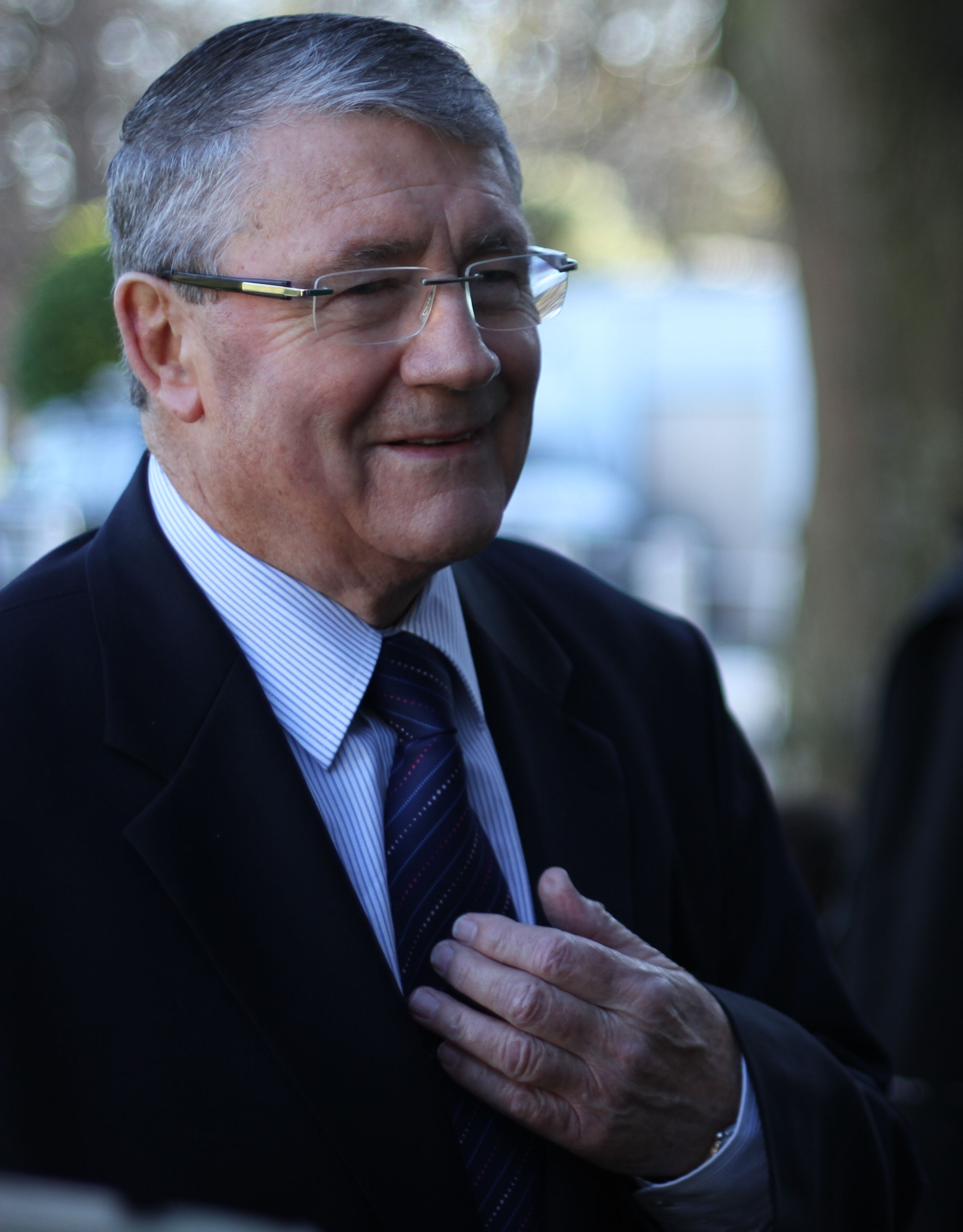
Jim Anderton

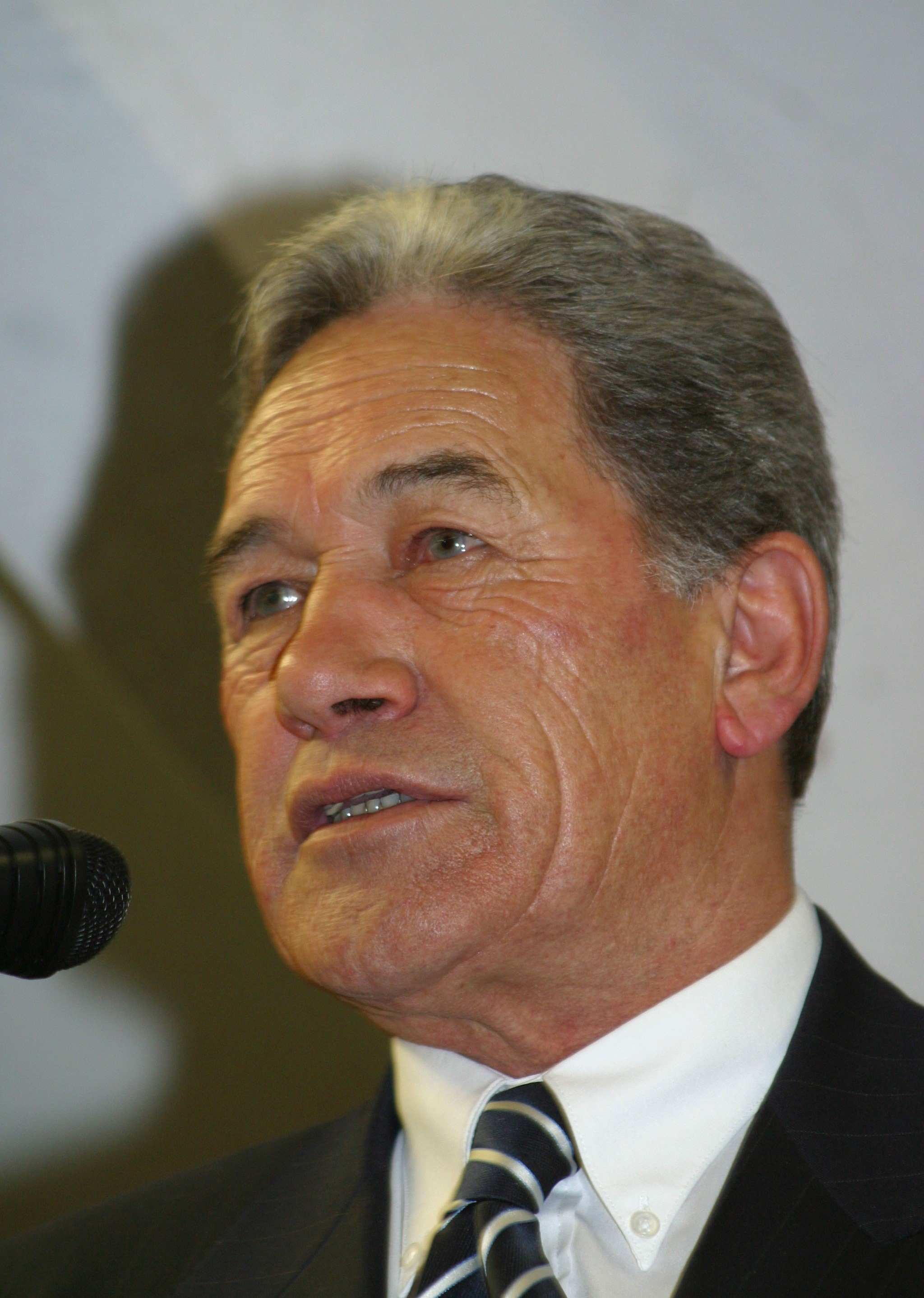
Winston Peters

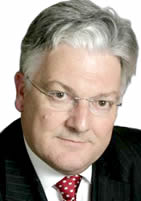
Peter Dunne

=== Parliamentary leaders ===
- National (opposition) – Don Brash to 27 November, John Key (Leader of the Opposition)
- Greens (opposition) – Jeanette Fitzsimons (to 2 June 2006) and Russel Norman
- Act (opposition) – Rodney Hide
- New Zealand First – Winston Peters
- United Future – Peter Dunne
- Māori Party (opposition) – Tariana Turia and Pita Sharples

=== Judiciary ===
- Chief Justice — Sian Elias
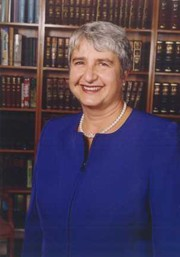
Dame Sian Elias

=== Main centre leaders ===
- Mayor of Auckland City – Dick Hubbard
- Mayor of Tauranga – Stuart Crosby
- Mayor of Hamilton – Michael Redman
- Mayor of Wellington – Kerry Prendergast
- Mayor of Christchurch – Garry Moore
- Mayor of Dunedin – Peter Chin
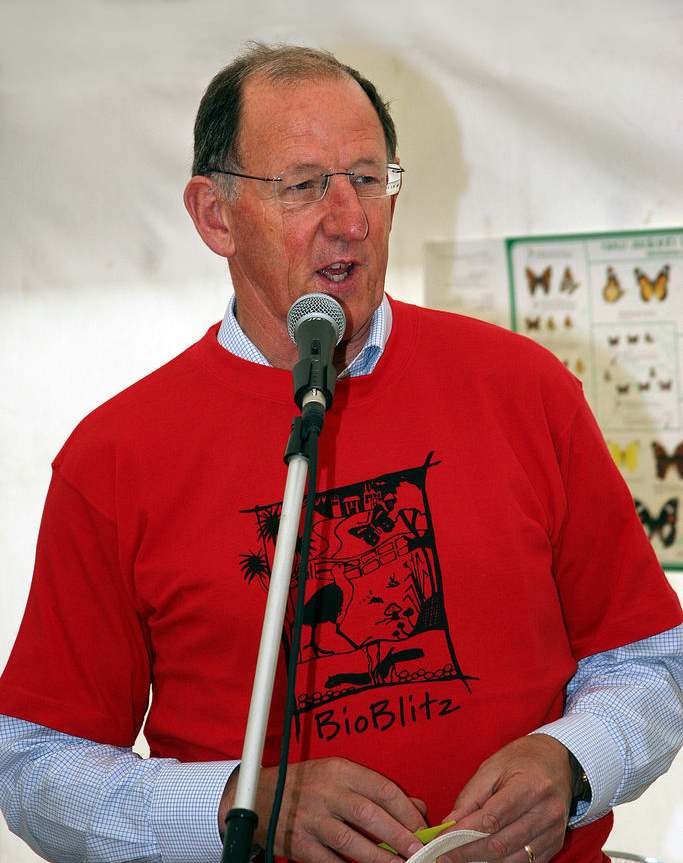
Dick Hubbard

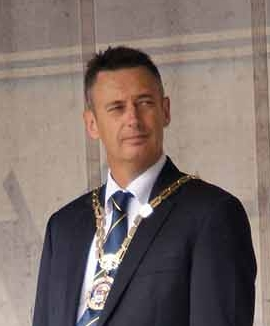
Stuart Crosby

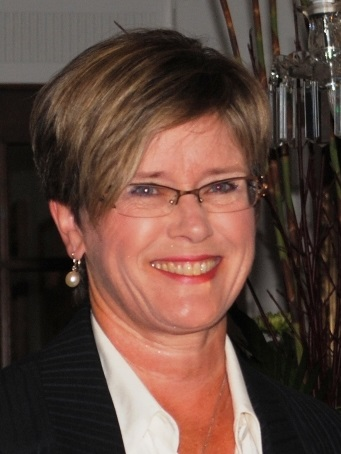
Kerry Prendergast

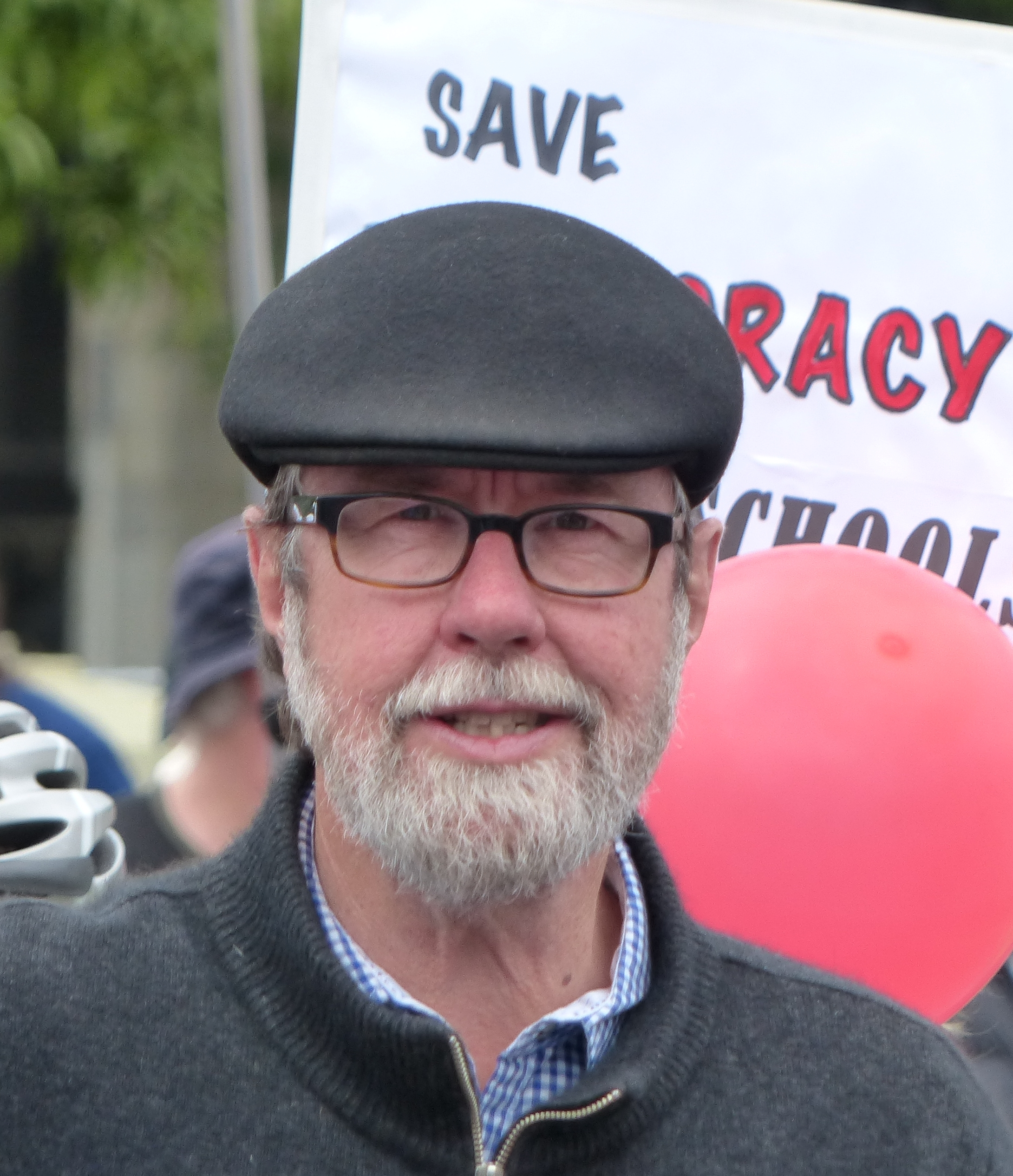
Garry Moore

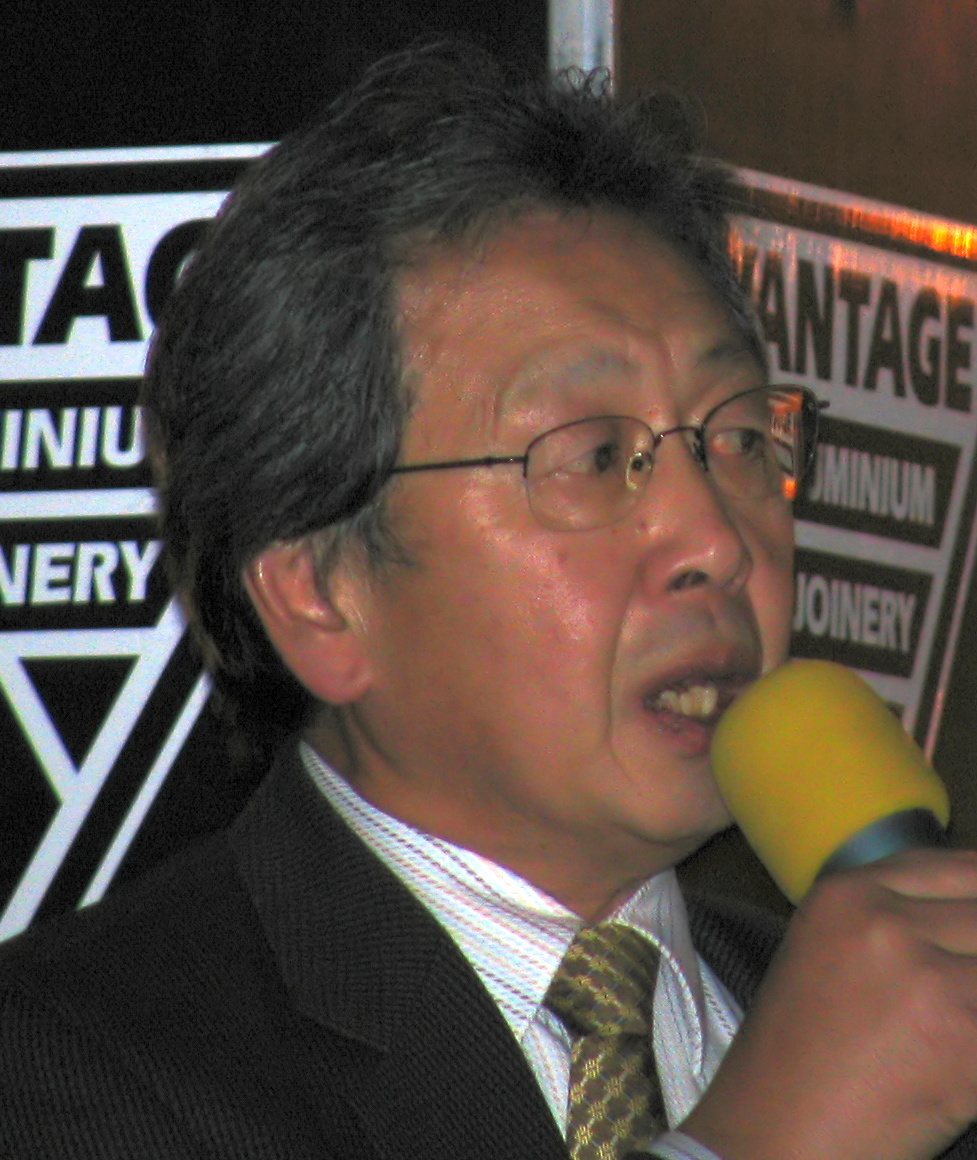
Peter Chin

== Events ==
=== January ===
- 1 January: Changes to New Zealand citizenship laws mean not all babies born in New Zealand have a right to be citizens. Babies must now have a parent who is a citizen or permanent resident of New Zealand or its dependencies.
- 2 January: New Zealand's warm sunny New Year weather has come to a sudden end as gale-force winds and rain assault southern New Zealand. (Wikinews)
- 7 January:The New Zealand Māori Queen, Te Arikinui Dame Te Atairangikaahu, is undergoing dialysis treatment, the Tainui Tribe confirmed today. The Queen's condition is not believed to be critical. (Wikinews)
- 9 January: Electricity generator and retailer TrustPower announces that it is considering a wind farm development at Lake Mahinerangi, south of Dunedin. (Wikinews)
- 13 January: Winston Peters says there is no travel warning for New Zealanders visiting Fiji, although Australia has issued one, after the Fijian military commander threatened to remove the Government.
- 14 January:The Government announces a review of liquor advertising amidst concern over teenage binge drinking. The review was to consider regulating sponsorship of sport by alcohol companies. At the time, Lion Nathan said there was no need for change.
- 15 January: Review of David Lange's documents show that the United States threatened to spy on New Zealand if it did not back down from its 1980s anti-nuclear legislation.

=== February ===
- 1 February: Don Brash, the leader of the New Zealand National Party gave his third state of the nation speech to the Orewa Rotary Club where he focused on the economy. Wikinews
- 4 February: Two Fairfax-owned newspapers, The Dominion Post and The Christchurch Press, controversially published all 12 cartoons in the Jyllands-Posten Muhammad cartoons controversy, which have triggered international outrage.
- 5 February: Hundreds of NZ Muslims march in downtown Auckland in protest to the publication of the Jyllands-Posten Muhammad cartoons controversy. Wikinews
- 5 February: NZ film director Lee Tamahori is arrested and formally charged with soliciting and unlawfully loitering on Hollywood's Santa Monica Boulevard, while dressed in drag.
- 6 February: The 166th anniversary of the signing of the Treaty of Waitangi, New Zealand's founding document, in 1840. This year the celebrations were peaceful, in contrast to other years where the day was the focus of protest by Māori activists. Wikinews
- 11 February: Tokelau began voting in a referendum to determine whether it remains a New Zealand territory, or becomes a state in free association with New Zealand.
- 12 February: The Royal New Zealand Navy's new 9000-tonne Multi-Role Vessel was launched in Rotterdam. The MRV is the largest of seven new ships ordered as part of "Project Protector".
- 14 February: Fisheries Minister Jim Anderton announced that a draft agreement had been reached with fishing companies to ban bottom trawling in 30 percent of New Zealand's exclusive economic zone. Anderton promised to support a global ban on bottom trawling if that appeared a practical option.
- 16 February: New Zealand all-rounder Chris Cairns, ONZM played his final international cricket match against the West Indies in a Twenty20 at Auckland's Eden Park.
- 16 February: Tokelau decides to remain a New Zealand territory after a referendum on independence. A 60 percent majority voted in favour of independence, but a two-thirds majority was required for the referendum to succeed.
- 20 February: Air New Zealand is set to lay off another 507 workers as it outsources its wide-body aircraft maintenance. A union proposal to save some of the jobs failed to win a worker vote.
- 23 February: Air New Zealand workers accepted a new employment package in a new vote. About 300 wide-body aircraft maintenance jobs will be saved in Auckland, although 200 will still be made redundant.
- 24 February:Air New Zealand announced that 470 corporate jobs, mostly in Auckland, would be axed over the next year.

=== March ===
- 6 March:
  - Child Youth and Family merges with the Ministry of Social Development.
  - Fairfax purchases the New Zealand online auction site Trade Me for NZ$625 million.
  - The Banks Peninsula District merges with the Christchurch City Council.
- 7 March: The 2006 New Zealand census is held. For the first time, respondents had the option of completing their census form via the internet rather than by a printed form.
- 15 March: The 2006 Commonwealth Games opens in Melbourne. New Zealand is represented by 255 athletes, its largest team ever to a Commonwealth Games.
- 17 March: DoC starts an emergency evacuation of Raoul Island after one of the island's volcanoes erupts. One person was missing at the time of the evacuation, whose body was not recovered.
- 17 March: A report on Auckland traffic congestion suggests charges of $3–$6 for a vehicle to enter the Auckland isthmus, or a $10 surcharge on all parking in the CBD.
- 20 March: David Parker resigns as Attorney-General after publicity about an incorrect declaration he filed with the Companies Office. The following day he resigned from Cabinet.
- 25 March: Restaurant Brands, the franchise holder for KFC, Pizza Hut and Starbucks, have agreed to phase out youth rates. BP agreed to scrap youth rates earlier.
- 26 March: In the 2006 Commonwealth Games, New Zealand wins 31 medals, which puts it in 9th place. This is New Zealand's worst performance at a Commonwealth Games since 1982.
- 28 March: Farmers are unhappy with the new law that all dogs first registered after 1 July 2006 must be microchipped. They want farm dogs to be exempt, and have drawn a parallel to the Dog Tax War of 1898.
- 29 March: New Zealand's first reported case of ATM Card Skimming was found at BNZ New Lynn.
- 31 March: Assistant police commissioner Clinton Rickards and two former police officers are found not guilty of the alleged rape and sexual abuse of Louise Nicholas in Rotorua in the 1980s.

=== April ===
- 2 April: The Auckland City Council wins a Pigasus Award for granting $2500 to the Foundation For Spiritualist Mediums "to teach people to communicate with the dead".
- 3 April: It was announced that Judge Anand Satyanand has been appointed to succeed Dame Silvia Cartwright as The Queen's Governor-General of New Zealand. He will take up office on 4 August 2006.
- 6 April: The New Zealand Parliament passes an act making New Zealand Sign Language an official language of New Zealand.
- 6 April: Helen Clark and Chinese Premier Wen Jiabao meet in Wellington and agree to aim for a Free Trade Agreement between New Zealand and China within two years.
- 7 April: Following acquittal of three men in the Louise Nicholas rape trial, pamphlets and emails about two of the defendants are widely circulated in defiance of previous court suppression orders.
- 10 April: Auckland rises to 5th place behind Zürich and Geneva in a survey of the world's top 55 cities for quality of life. Wellington places 12th.
- 19 April: The New Zealand Government is to send reinforcements to the Solomon Islands to support RAMSI following an outbreak of violence after the election of Snyder Rini as the new Prime Minister yesterday.
- 26 April: David Parker is cleared of any misconduct by the Companies Office. He was granted an exemption in 1999 from the rules he had fallen foul of. He is likely to be reinstated to the Cabinet next week.
- 27 April:The Electricity Commission has rejected Transpower's plan to build a line of power pylons from Auckland to Whakamaru. The plan had drawn protests from landowners along the route.
- 30 April: Following acquittal of three men in the Louise Nicholas rape trial, several hundred people marched up Queen Street, in support of Louise Nicholas.

=== May ===
- 1 May: Troubles continue at TVNZ, with leaked emails from Craig Boyce to Ian Fraser, referring to the Parliamentary select committee as "the bastards are our enemy".
- 3 May: The New Zealand Government announces that it will require Telecom to unbundle the local loop to provide "access to fast, competitively priced broadband internet".
- 13 May: The trawler Kotuku sinks in Foveaux Strait on the way back from muttonbirding. Of the nine people on board, including three generations of one family, only three survive. It is New Zealand's worst maritime disaster since the sinking of TEV Wahine.
- 15 May: After 40 days of climbing, New Zealander Mark Inglis became the first double amputee to reach the summit of Mount Everest, the tallest mountain in the world.
- 16 May: Michael Ryan, a messenger for the Department of Prime Minister and Cabinet is named as the government employee who leaked the information to Telecom that the government is planning to "unbundle the local loop".
- 17 May: An attempt by the Green Party to repeal part of a controversial dog microchipping law was voted down 61–60.
- 18 May: Finance Minister Michael Cullen delivers the 2006 Budget.
- 24 May: The week-long festivities celebrating the 40th anniversary of the Māori Queen's coronation have ended.
- 25 May: The three men acquitted of rape in the Louise Nicholas trial now face a new trial for alleged sexual offences against another woman in the mid-1980s.
- 27 May: The Write4gold international graffiti art competition is held in New Zealand.

=== June ===
- 3 June: The Green Party elects Russel Norman as its co-leader to replace Rod Donald.
- 6 June: The trial of Tim Selwyn for sedition begins in Auckland. Selwyn is the first New Zealander in over 80 years to be charged with sedition.
- 7 June: The Privy Council agrees to hear David Bain's appeal against his conviction for the murder of his family.
- 8 June: Tim Selwyn is found guilty of sedition.
- 8 June: New Zealand has won hosting rights for the 2010 World Rowing Championships, which will be held at Lake Karapiro.
- 10 June: The family of Richard Seddon remember his death 100 years ago.
- 10 June: A Yemeni man, linked to the 11 September 2001 attacks in the United States, has been deported from New Zealand. It is only the second time that section 72 of the Immigration Act has been used to deport someone. Its use requires the consent of the Governor-General, and there is no right of appeal.
- 12 June: A blackout hits Auckland, lasting for several hours and affecting an estimated 700,000 people. The cause was found to be an earth wire which snapped off in high winds and fell across high-voltage transmission lines at a substation.
- A severe storm lashed the country, bringing heavy snow to Otago and Canterbury Some isolated communities lose power for up to three weeks after the storm. Up to three feet of snow was recorded in inland Canterbury.
- 15 June: A free-to-air digital television service called Freeview will be launched in 2007. All viewers will require a set-top box, and some will need a satellite dish.
- 15 June: Junior doctors begin a five-day strike over working hours and conditions. Hospitals defer non-urgent surgery and outpatient treatments.
- 16 June: The Varroa bee mite has been found near Stoke. The mite arrived in New Zealand in 2000 and has been confined to the North Island until now.
- 18 June: The deaths of three-month-old twins Chris and Cru Kahui as a result of abuse injuries shocks the nation and dominates headlines for months.
- 21 June: Working dogs have been exempted from the dog microchipping legislation currently before Parliament.
- 27 June: Telecom announces it will voluntarily separate its business into two operating entities – Wholesale and Retail.
- 29 June: Development of the Kupe gas and oil field off the Taranaki coast will go ahead, with production beginning in 2009.
- 30 June: Tame Iti is sentenced to pay $300 and court costs for shooting the New Zealand Flag.

=== July ===
- 2 July: The Intellectual Property Office has turned down an application by Ngāti Toa to trademark Ka Mate, the haka used by the All Blacks.
- 3 July: Police Minister Annette King and Police Commissioner Howard Broad both deny that New Zealand Police have quotas for speeding tickets after a memo about such quotas is leaked.
- 4 July:An Italian Fiat advert draws criticism from the Ministry of Foreign Affairs and Trade for having women perform the haka.
- 7 July: A state of emergency is declared in Manawatu-Wanganui due to flooding.
- 10 July: Labour List MP Jim Sutton announces he is leaving politics on 1 August 2006. He will be replaced by the next member of the Labour Party list, Charles Chauvel.
- 11 July: Te Atairangi Kaahu, the Māori Queen, is taken to Waikato Hospital's intensive care unit after a possible heart attack and kidney failure.
- 18 July: Tim Selwyn is sentenced to 2 months imprisonment for sedition in Auckland. He is also sentenced to a further 15 months for other offenses.
- 18 July: Former Cabinet Minister Taito Phillip Field is cleared of any conflict of interest by an inquiry into allegations he had used his position for material gain, but his judgement was criticised.
- 25 July: The Overlander rail passenger service will be withdrawn at the end of September, thus ending the last passenger service operating between Auckland and Wellington.
- 31 July: New smaller and lighter coins are introduced in denominations of 10c, 20c, and 50c.

=== August ===
- 10 August: Origin Pacific Airways suspends passenger operations and lays off most of its staff. Freight operations will continue.
- 15 August: Māori Queen Dame Te Atairangi Kaahu dies after a long illness.
- 19 August: The All Blacks win the 2006 rugby union Tri Nations series.
- 21 August: Tuheitia Paki, the eldest son of Dame Te Atairangikaahu, is selected as the new Māori King.
- 23 August: Anand Satyanand is sworn in as the new Governor-General of New Zealand.
- 25 August An industrial dispute between supermarket company Progressive Enterprises and employees in the EPMU and NDU begins and lasts until 21 September
- 28 August: Helen Clark suggests that Taito Phillip Field should reconsider his future as an MP, after fresh allegations are made against him.

=== September ===
- 2 September: Natural gas supplies were cut to about 1000 central Wellington businesses for four days, after water entered Powerco's gas mains.
- 7 September: Four mayors in the Auckland Region meet with Helen Clark to discuss the possibility of amalgamating their city councils to a single body.
- 10 September: Tonga's King Taufa'ahau Tupou IV dies in Auckland.
- 13 September: Don Brash takes leave to sort out marital problems amidst rumours he had an affair.
- 14 September: Stephen Tindall announces his intention of buying out the other shareholders in the retail chain he founded, The Warehouse. At the time, Tindall had a controlling share in the company. He abandoned his plans for the buyout in October 2006 following opposition from other retailers.
- 18 September: The Prime Minister's husband Peter Davis is accused of being gay, after a picture is published of him kissing another man. Both Davis and Clark deny the claim; the picture later turns out to be a still from election night coverage. See also:Investigate.
- 21 September: The dispute between supermarket company Progressive Enterprises and over 500 employees is resolved after 28 days.
- 25 September: Shares in carpet maker Feltex are suspended on the New Zealand Exchange after the company is placed in receivership on 22 September.
- 26 September: Brian Connell is suspended from the National Party caucus.
- 27 September: Bacardi offers NZ$138 million to buy the New Zealand alcoholic drink company 42 Below.
- 28 September: Dunedin's Logan Park High School is threatened by a large forest fire in a plantation bordering the school.
- 28 September: The Overlander train between Auckland and Wellington, due to be withdrawn at the end of the month, is to continue, but on a reduced schedule.
- 29 September: The Presbyterian Church of Aotearoa New Zealand votes to confirm a ban on people in de facto or gay relationships from becoming leaders in the Church.
- 30 September: The New Zealand Government apologises to the Te Arawa iwi over Treaty of Waitangi grievances, and returns 500 square kilometres of Crown land and 19 areas of special significance to it.

=== October ===
- 1 October: The Wearable Art Parade is held in central Wellington.
- 3 October: The Christian Heritage Party announces that it is disbanding.
- 8 October: Fisheries officers' request to be allowed to carry batons and pepper spray is denied by Minister Jim Anderton.
- 18 October: Awards ceremony for the New Zealand Music Awards (the Tuis).
- 26 October: The father of Chris and Cru Kahui is charged with their murder in June
- 31 October: The five-cent coin, and the larger pre-2006 ten-cent, twenty-cent, and fifty-cent coins are withdrawn from circulation and demonetised.

=== November ===
- 11 November: New Zealand War Memorial opened in Hyde Park, London
- Icebergs are sighted within 100 km of the New Zealand coastline.
- National Party leader Don Brash resigns.
- John Key appointed leader of the National Party, with Bill English as deputy.

=== December ===
- 4 December: The Copyright (New Technologies and Performers' Rights) Amendment Bill, is introduced to update copyright laws due to the development and adoption of new technologies.
- 16 December: Three children are killed when a cliff collapses on them at a riverside picnic ground in the Manawatu region.
- 16 December: Nine experienced New Zealand fire-fighters are injured, one seriously, as they fought bushfires in Victoria, Australia.
- 22 December: The Government announces changes to the regulations governing the sale of consumer fireworks. Sales will now be restricted to 3 (previously 10) days of the year – 3–5 November and the age limit for purchase has been raised from 16 to 18.
- 28 December – The contentious Wellington Inner city bypass opens
- 31 December: The 2006 road toll provisionally stands at 387, the lowest figure since 1963
- See also Current events in Oceania

=== Date unknown ===
- New Zealand Open Rescue, an animal rights advocacy organisation is formed.

== Arts and literature ==
=== Awards ===
- Catherine Chidgey and Dianne Ruth Pettis win the Robert Burns Fellowship.

=== Performing arts ===
- Benny Award presented by the Variety Artists Club of New Zealand to Alan Watson.

=== Television ===
- 8 February: SKY Network Television purchases Prime. SKY broadcasts delayed sports events for the first time on Prime.
- 4 December: Susan Wood resigns as a presenter for Television New Zealand due to continuing health concerns.

=== Film ===
- No. 2
- Perfect Creature
- Sione's Wedding
- Out of the Blue

=== Internet ===
- March – the sale of New Zealand's busiest web site, Trade Me Ltd. to the Fairfax group for $NZ700 million is announced.
- October – Vodafone New Zealand purchases ISP ihug for NZ$41 million from iiNet.

== Sport ==
=== Athletics ===
- Dale Warrender wins his second national title in the men's marathon, clocking 2:17:43 on 29 October in Auckland, while Tracey Clissold claims her second as well in the women's championship (2:50:47).

=== Basketball ===
- Women’s National Basketball League was won by Auckland, who beat North Harbour 75–74 in the final.
- National Basketball League was won by the Hawkes Bay Hawks, who beat the Auckland Stars 84-69

=== Commonwealth Games ===
Gold	Silver	Bronze	Total
6	12	13	31

=== Cricket ===
- The Black Caps defeat the West Indies 4–1 in a series of One-day Internationals during February.

=== Horse racing ===
==== Harness racing ====
- New Zealand Trotting Cup: Flashing Red
- Auckland Trotting Cup: Mi Muchacho

=== Mountain biking ===
- August – UCI Mountain Bike World Cup is held in Rotorua

=== Olympic Games ===
- New Zealand sends 18 competitors across five sports, its largest ever team to a Winter Olympics.

Gold	Silver	Bronze	Total
0	0	0	0

=== Paralympic Games ===
- New Zealand sends a team of two competitors in one sport.

Gold	Silver	Bronze	Total
0	0	0	0

=== Rugby league ===
- Bartercard Cup won by the Auckland Lions

=== Rugby union ===
- New Zealand (All Blacks) retained the Tri Nations and Bledisloe Cup. Only losing one match to South Africa.
- North Harbour wins the Ranfurly Shield from Canterbury 21–17 at Jade Stadium
- The All Blacks convincingly won all four tests in their end-of-season tour of England, France and Wales.

=== Rowing ===
- Mahé Drysdale defends his gold medal at the World Championships in August

=== Shooting ===
- Ballinger Belt – Brian Carter (Te Puke)

=== Soccer ===
- The Chatham Cup is won by Western Suburbs FC (Wellington) who beat Eastern Suburbs (Auckland) 0–0 in the final (3-0 on penalties).

== Births ==
- 4 March – Luke Supyk, association footballer
- 4 May – Rocco Jamieson, snowboarder
- 6 July
  - Campbell Melville Ives, snowboarder
  - Finley Melville Ives, freestyle skier
- 20 August – More Joyous, Thoroughbred racehorse
- 14 September – Katie Lee, Thoroughbred racehorse
- 7 October – Military Move, Thoroughbred racehorse
- 3 November – Ambitious Dragon, Thoroughbred racehorse
- 5 November – Little Bridge, Thoroughbred racehorse
- 8 November – Marley Leuluai, association footballer
- 10 November – So You Think, Thoroughbred racehorse
- 30 November – Erice van Leuven, mountain biker

=== Exact date unlisted ===
- Lucy Gray, climate change activist

== Deaths ==
=== January ===
- 4 January – Bob White, politician (born 1914)
- 19 January – Geoff Rabone, cricketer (born 1921)
- 21 January – Leslie Butler, cricketer (born 1934)
- 22 January – Gwenethe Walshe, ballroom dancer and dance teacher (born 1908)

=== February ===
- 1 February
  - Bryce Harland, diplomat (born 1931)
  - Rona Tong, athlete (born 1910)
- 19 February – Wi Kuki Kaa, actor (born 1938)
- 22 February – Bob McDonald, lawn bowls player (born 1933)
- 28 February – Peter Snow, doctor who discovered "Tapanui flu" (born 1935)

=== March ===
- 5 March – Peter Malone, veterinary surgeon and politician, mayor of Nelson (1980–92) (born 1924)
- 8 March – Sir Brian Barratt-Boyes, heart surgeon (born 1924)
- 18 March – Brede Arkless, mountaineer (born 1939)
- 22 March – Bev Brewis, athlete (born 1930)
- 24 March – Mirosław Złotkowski, wrestler (born 1956)

=== April ===
- 4 April – Trevor Moffitt, artist (born 1936)
- 5 April – Tom McNab, association football player (born 1933)
- 17 April – Gordon Bromley, long-distance runner (born 1916)
- 21 April – Johnny Checketts, World War II flying ace (born 1912)

=== May ===
- 11 May – Bob Duff, rugby union player, local-body politician (born 1925)
- 16 May – Anthony Murray, rugby league player and coach (born c.1958)
- 26 May – Anne Delamere, public servant (born 1921)
- 30 May – David Lloyd, botanist (born 1937)

=== June ===
- 2 June – Kitione Lave, boxer (born 1934)
- 4 June – Vic Belsham, rugby league player and referee (born c.1925)
- 11 June – Neroli Fairhall, archer, first paraplegic to compete in the Olympic Games (born 1944)
- 12 June – Nicky Barr, rugby union player and World War II flying ace (born 1915)
- 13 June – Barry Thompson, rugby union player (born 1947)
- 15 June – Herb Pearson, cricketer (born 1910)
- 26 June – Bubbles Mihinui, tourist guide, community leader (born 1919)

=== July ===
- 5 July – Kevin Herlihy, softball player (born 1947)
- 7 July – John Money, psychologist and sexologist (born 1921)
- 17 July – Roy Cowan, potter, illustrator, printmaker (born 1918)
- 21 July – Tony George, weightlifter (born 1919)
- 22 July
  - Ian Burrows, soldier (born 1930)
  - Erenora Puketapu-Hetet, tohunga raranga (born 1941)
- 25 July – Cis Winstanley, lawn bowls player (born 1908)
- 28 July – Nigel Cox, author and museum director (born 1951)
- 29 July – Harry Hawthorn, anthropology academic and museum curator (born 1910)

=== August ===
- 9 August – Colin Dickinson, cyclist (born 1931)
- 15 August – Te Arikinui Dame Te Atairangikaahu, the Māori queen (born 1931)
- 18 August – Jotham Pellew, wrestler (born 1978)
- 23 August – Jack Ridley, civil engineer and politician (born 1919)
- 25 August – Roy Geddes, physical biochemistry academic (born 1940)
- 29 August – John Scandrett, cricketer (born 1915)
- 30 August – Robin Cooke, Baron Cooke of Thorndon, jurist (born 1926)

=== September ===
- 4 September – Ron Stone, association football player (born 1913)
- 10 September – Tāufaʻāhau Tupou IV, king of Tonga (born 1918)
- 11 September – Nancy Borlase, artist (born 1914)
- 19 September – Sir Hugh Kāwharu, Māori leader and anthropology academic (born 1927)
- 23 September – Joan Hart, athlete (born 1925)
- 24 September – Joan Hatcher, cricketer (born 1923)
- 29 September – Walter Hadlee, cricket player and administrator (born 1915)

=== October ===
- 2 October – Brian Fitzpatrick, rugby union player (born 1931)
- 8 October – Mark Porter, motor racing driver (born 1974)
- 14 October – Peter Munz, philosopher and historian (born 1921)

=== November ===
- 2 November – Derek Turnbull, athlete (born 1926)
- 14 November – Owen Truelove, glider pilot (born 1937)
- 16 November – John Dougan, rugby union player (born 1946)
- 18 November – Charles Luney, construction company director (born 1905)

=== December ===
- 6 December – John Feeney, documentary film director (born 1922)
- 8 December – Jim McCormick, rugby union player (born 1923)
- 10 December – Willow Macky, songwriter (born 1921)
- 22 December – Winifred Lawrence, swimmer (born 1920)
- 23 December – Graham May, weightlifter (born c.1952)
- 29 December – Tom Lynch, rugby union and rugby league player (born 1927)

== Births to deaths ==
- 20 March to 18 June – Cris and Cru Kahui

== See also ==
- List of years in New Zealand
- Timeline of New Zealand history
- History of New Zealand
- Military history of New Zealand
- Timeline of the New Zealand environment
- Timeline of New Zealand's links with Antarctica
