= North Island cricket team =

New Zealand cricket team

The North Island cricket team is a representative cricket team based in New Zealand. They have played intermittently in first-class and List A cricket since 1894. They have most frequently played against the South Island cricket team, but have also played first-class matches against touring national teams. In the 1981–82, 1993–94 and 1994–95 seasons, they faced South Island in one-day matches billed as the "Plunket Shield", while similar contests in 2003–04 and 2004–05 were named the "State of Origin" matches, as were two Twenty20 fixtures played in 2014–15 and 2015–16.

== North Island v South Island ==
The first-class matches between North Island and South Island have often been used to help the national selectors choose teams for forthcoming tours or Test series. South Island won the first match between the two teams in 1903–04, by two wickets. North Island won the most recent first-class match in 1999–2000 by 32 runs.

In all, the two teams have played each other 12 times in first-class matches. North Island have won six times, South Island four times, and two matches have been drawn. The highest score for North Island is 208 not out by Bert Sutcliffe in 1947–48, and the best innings and match bowling figures are 5 for 37 and 10 for 101 by Bob Blair in 1957–58.

In their five List A matches, North Island have won four times, South Island once, whilst the two Twenty20 fixtures played between the teams have seen one victory for each team.

== Players ==
The following players have appeared for North Island, in first-class, List A or Twenty20 matches.

As of 9 September 2024

- Andre Adams, 1 List A match, 2004/05
- Graeme Aldridge, 1 List A match, 2004/05
- Cyril Allcott, 1 first-class match, 1921/22
- Ray Allen, 1 first-class match, 1944/45
- Bryan Andrews, 1 first-class match, 1968/69
- Frank Ashbolt, 1 first-class match, 1893/94
- Michael Austen, 1 List A match, 1993/94
- Wiri Baker, 1 first-class match, 1921/22
- Trevor Barber, 1 first-class match, 1957/58
- Wally Barclay, 1 first-class match, 1921/22
- Aaron Barnes, 1 first-class match, 1999/00
- Don Beard, 2 first-class matches, 1957/58–1958/59
- John Beck, 1 first-class match, 1954/55
- Matthew Bell, 2 first-class matches, 1999/00
- Larry Bishop, 1 first-class match, 1903/04
- Robert Blacklock, 1 first-class match, 1893/94
- Bob Blair, 3 first-class matches, 1954/55–1958/59
- Denis Blundell, 1 first-class match, 1934/35
- Mark Burgess, 4 first-class matches, 1968/69–1977/78
- Ces Burke, 1 first-class match, 1944/45
- Ian Butler, 1 List A match, 2003/04
- Les Butler, 1 first-class match, 1958/59
- Lance Cairns, 1 List A match, 1981/82
- Chris Cairns, 1 List A match, 2003/04
- Colin Campbell, 1 first-class match, 1921/22
- Tama Canning, 1 List A match, 2004/05
- Mark Carrington, 1 first-class match, 1981/82
- Harry Cave, 2 first-class matches, 1954/55–1957/58
- Rex Challies, 1 first-class match, 1947/48
- Ewen Chatfield, 2 first-class matches, 1977/78–1981/82
- Don Clarke, 1 first-class match, 1954/55
- Ossie Cleal, 1 first-class match, 1944/45
- Richard Collinge, 4 first-class matches, 1968/69–1977/78
- David Collins, 1 first-class match, 1921/22
- Ian Colquhoun, 1 first-class match, 1954/55
- Jeremy Coney, 2 first-class matches, 1 List A match, 1977/78–1981/82
- Barry Cooper, 1 List A match, 1981/82
- Jack Cowie, 1 first-class match, 1934/35
- Christopher Cross, 1 first-class match, 1893/94
- Martin Crowe, 1 first-class match, 2 List A matches, 1981/82–1994/95
- Bob Cunis, 1 first-class match, 1968/69
- Mike Curtis, 1 first-class match, 1957/58
- Ces Dacre, 1 first-class match, 1921/22
- Derek de Boorder, 1 T20 match, 2014/15
- Colin de Grandhomme, 2 T20 matches, 2014/15–2015/16
- Richard de Groen, 1 List A match, 1994/95
- Anton Devcich, 2 T20 matches, 2014/15–2015/16
- David Donald, 1 first-class match, 1958/59
- Mark Douglas, 1 List A match, 1993/94
- Jimmy Ell, 1 first-class match, 1934/35
- Grant Elliott, 1 T20 match, 2015/16
- James Franklin, 1 List A match, 1 T20 match, 2004/05–2014/15
- Trevor Franklin, 1 first-class match, 1 List A match, 1981/82
- Derwent Garrard, 1 first-class match, 1921/22
- Charles Gore, 1 first-class match, 1893/94
- Doug Gray, 1 first-class match, 1958/59
- Evan Gray, 1 first-class match, 1981/82
- Mark Greatbatch, 1 List A match, 1994/95
- Wayne Greenstreet, 1 first-class match, 1970/71
- Martin Guptill, 1 T20 match, 2014/15
- John Guy, 1 first-class match, 1954/55
- Everett Hales, 1 first-class match, 1903/04
- Noel Harford, 1 first-class match, 1954/55
- Roger Harris, 1 first-class match, 1958/59
- Matthew Hart, 1 List A match, 1994/95
- Mark Haslam, 1 List A match, 1993/94
- Douglas Hay, 1 first-class match, 1903/04
- Syd Hiddleston, 1 first-class match, 1921/22
- Ronnie Hira, 1 T20 match, 2014/15
- Alfred Holdship, 1 first-class match, 1893/94
- Gareth Hopkins, 1 List A match, 2004/05
- Ken Hough, 1 first-class match 1958/59
- Jamie How, 1 List A match, 2004/05
- Geoff Howarth, 1 first-class match, 1 List A match, 1977/78–1981/82
- Hedley Howarth, 3 first-class matches, 1968/69–1977/78
- Mark Jefferson, 1 first-class match, 1999/00
- Andrew Jones, 1 List A match, 1993/94
- Richard Jones, 1 List A match, 1994/95
- Jimmy Kemp, 1 first-class match, 1947/48
- Len Kent, 1 first-class match, 1947/48
- Charlie Kerr, 1 first-class match, 1944/45
- Jack Lamason, 1 first-class match, 1934/35
- Herb Lambert, 1 first-class match, 1921/22
- Gavin Larsen, 1 List A match, 1993/94
- Hugh Lusk, 1 first-class match, 1893/94
- James Macassey, 1 first-class match, 1903/04 (Note: Macassey was born at Dunedin in 1878 and educated at Otago Boys' High School in the city. He played seven first-class matches for Hawke's Bay between the 1900–01 and 1912–13 seasons, and was a representative rugby player for the province. A businessman who managed AS Paterson and Co in Dunedin from 1916, he died at Dunedin in 1941.)
- Mitchell McClenaghan, 2 T20 matches, 2014/15–2015/16
- James McDonogh, 1 first-class match, 1893/94
- Don MacLeod, 1 first-class match, 1957/58
- Eddie McLeod, 1 first-class match, 1921/22
- Erv McSweeney, 1 first-class match, 1981/82
- Jeremiah Mahoney, 1 first-class match, 1903/04
- Hamish Marshall, 2 List A matches, 2003/04–2004/05
- James Marshall, 2 first-class matches, 1999/00
- Dick Mason, 1 first-class match, 1903/04
- Michael Mason, 1 first-class match, 1 List A match, 1999/00–2003/04
- Mal Matheson, 1 first-class match, 1944/45
- Lawrie Miller, 1 first-class match, 1954/55
- George Mills, 1 first-class match, 1893/94
- Isaac Mills, 1 first-class match, 1893/94
- Kyle Mills, 1 T20 match, 2014/15
- Adam Milne, 2 T20 matches, 2014/15–2015/16
- Frank Mooney, 1 first-class match, 1944/45
- Ross Morgan, 3 first-class matches, 1968/69–1970/71
- John Morris, 1 first-class match, 1954/55
- Bruce Morrison, 1 first-class match, 1957/58
- John Morrison, 1 first-class match, 1981/82
- Lance Mountain, 1 first-class match, 1970/71
- Colin Munro, 2 T20 matches, 2014/15–2015/16
- Bruce Murray, 3 first-class matches, 1968/69–1970/71
- Ron Murray, 1 first-class match, 1947/48
- Jimmy Neesham, 1 T20 match, 2015/16
- Chris Nevin, 2 first-class matches, 1 List A match, 1999/00–2003/04
- Caleb Olliff, 1 first-class match, 1903/04
- Jacob Oram, 1 List A match, 2003/04
- Adam Parore, 2 List A matches, 1993/94–1994/95
- Jeetan Patel, 1 List A match, 2004/05
- Herb Pearson, 1 first-class match, 1944/45
- Andrew Penn, 1 first-class match, 1999/00
- Eric Petrie, 1 first-class match, 1958/59
- Bill Playle, 2 first-class matches, 1957/58–1958/59
- Blair Pocock, 2 first-class matches, 1999/00
- Vic Pollard, 1 first-class match, 1968/69
- Alan Preston, 2 first-class matches, 1957/58–1958/59
- Chris Pringle, 2 List A matches, 1993/94–1994/95
- Geoff Rabone, 1 first-class match, 1954/55
- Rodney Redmond, 1 first-class match, 1970/71
- John F Reid, 1 first-class match, 1 List A match, 1977/78–1981/82
- John R Reid, 2 first-class matches, 1947/48–1954/55
- Andrew Reinholds, 1 List A match, 1993/94
- Herbert Rice, 1 first-class match, 1944/45
- Gary Robertson, 1 List A match, 1981/82
- Luke Ronchi, 1 T20 match, 2015/16
- Ian Rutherford, 1 first-class match, 1977/78
- Maurice Ryan, 1 first-class match, 1968/69
- Scott Sale, 1 first-class match, 1934/35
- Verdun Scott, 1 first-class match, 1947/48
- Murray Sharp, 1 first-class match, 1934/35
- Terry Shaw, 1 first-class match, 1957/58
- Mike Shrimpton, 3 first-class matches, 1968/69–1970/71
- Barry Sinclair, 1 first-class match, 1957/58
- Mathew Sinclair, 2 first-class matches, 2 List A matches, 1999/00–2004/05
- Ian Smith, 1 List A match, 1981/82
- Nessie Snedden, 1 first-class match, 1921/22
- Colin Snedden, 1 first-class match, 1947/48
- Martin Snedden, 1 first-class match, 1 List A match, 1981/82
- Ish Sodhi, 1 T20 match, 2015/16
- John Sparling, 1 first-class match, 1958/59
- Stewart Speed, 1 first-class match, 1968/69
- William Stemson, 1 first-class match, 1903/04
- Scott Styris, 1 List A match, 2003/04
- Murphy Su'a, 1 List A match, 1994/95
- Bert Sutcliffe, 2 first-class matches, 1944/45–1947/48
- Bruce Taylor, 1 first-class match, 1970/71
- Don Taylor, 1 first-class match, 1947/48
- Ross Taylor, 2 List A matches, 1 T20 match 2003/04–2015/16
- Shane Thomson, 2 List A matches, 1993/94–1994/95
- Eric Tindill, 1 first-class match, 1934/35
- Bill Tricklebank, 1 first-class match, 1934/35
- Gary Troup, 1 first-class matches, 1 List A match, 1977/78–1981/82
- Kinder Tucker, 1 first-class match, 1903/04
- Daryl Tuffey, 1 first-class match, 1 List A match, 1999/00–2003/04
- Roger Twose, 1 List A match, 1994/95
- Ernest Upham, 2 first-class matches, 1893/94–1903/04
- Daniel Vettori, 1 List A match, 1 T20 match, 2003/04–2014/15
- Lou Vincent, 2 first-class matches, 1 List A match, 1999/00–2004/05
- Graham Vivian, 3 first-class matches, 1968/69–1977/78
- Giff Vivian, 1 first-class match, 1934/35
- Brooke Walker, 2 first-class matches, 1999/00
- Merv Wallace, 3 first-class matches, 1934/35–1947/48
- Kerry Walmsley, 2 first-class matches, 1999/00
- Victor Waters, 1 first-class match, 1903/04
- Willie Watson, 1 List A match, 1993/94
- William Wheeler, 1 first-class match, 1944/45
- Paul Whitelaw, 1 first-class match, 1934/35
- Arnold Williams, 1 first-class match, 1893/94
- Stu Wilson, 1 first-class match, 1947/48
- John Wiltshire, 1 first-class match, 1981/82
- George Worker, 1 T20 match, 2015/16
- John Wright, 2 first-class matches, 1977/78–1981/82
- Bryan Young, 2 List A matches, 1993/94–1994/95
- Bryan Yuile, 2 first-class matches, 1968/69–1970/71
