= Brian Hastings =

New Zealand cricketer (1940–2024)

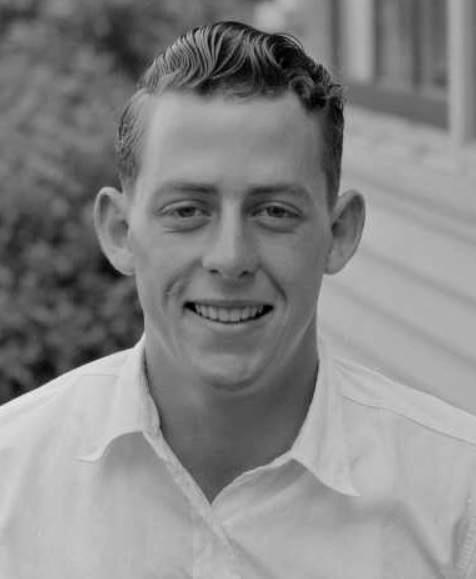
- Hastings in 1957

Personal information
- Full name: Brian Frederick Hastings
- Born: 23 March 1940; Island Bay, Wellington, New Zealand
- Died: 7 October 2024 (aged 84); Papanui, Christchurch, New Zealand
- Batting: Right-handed
- Bowling: Leg break
- Role: Batsman
- Relatives: Mark Hastings (son)

International information
- National side: New Zealand
- Test debut (cap 116): 27 February 1969 v West Indies
- Last Test: 24 January 1976 v India
- ODI debut (cap 7): 11 February 1973 v Pakistan
- Last ODI: 18 June 1975 v West Indies

Domestic team information
- Years: Team
- 1957/58: Wellington
- 1960/61: Central Districts
- 1961/62–1976/77: Canterbury

Career statistics
| Competition | Test | ODI | FC | LA |
|---|---|---|---|---|
| Matches | 31 | 11 | 163 | 29 |
| Runs scored | 1,510 | 151 | 7,686 | 629 |
| Batting average | 30.20 | 18.87 | 31.89 | 28.59 |
| 100s/50s | 4/7 | 0/0 | 15/38 | 0/3 |
| Top score | 117* | 37 | 226 | 56* |
| Balls bowled | 22 | – | 301 | 8 |
| Wickets | 0 | – | 4 | 0 |
| Bowling average | – | – | 34.75 | – |
| 5 wickets in innings | – | – | 0 | – |
| 10 wickets in match | – | – | 0 | – |
| Best bowling | – | – | 1/0 | – |
| Catches/stumpings | 23/– | 4/– | 112/– | 7/– |
- Source: Cricinfo, 22 April 2017

Brian Frederick Hastings (23 March 1940 – 7 October 2024) was a New Zealand cricketer. A middle-order batsman, he played 31 Test matches between 1969 and 1976, scoring four centuries. He played first-class cricket for Wellington, Central Districts and Canterbury between 1958 and 1977.

== Cricket career ==
=== Early career ===
Born on 23 March 1940 in the southern Wellington suburb of Island Bay, Hastings was educated at Wellington College. He made his first-class debut for Wellington at the age of 17 in the final match of the Plunket Shield in 1957–58, scoring 27 and 22 in a low-scoring match that Wellington won. He was immediately selected to play in one of the trial matches to help the selectors choose the team to tour England in 1958, but he was not successful.

He did not play first-class cricket again until late in 1960, but he captained the New Zealand Colts team on its tour of Australia in the 1959–60 season. In 1960–61 he had a full first-class season with Central Districts, with moderate success. In 1961 he transferred in his work with Shell Oil New Zealand from Blenheim to Christchurch, to commence work at The Press and in the 1961–62 season he played his first match for Canterbury in the final match of the Plunket Shield, scoring 149 and "batting beautifully".

Hastings struggled in subsequent seasons until 1964–65, when he made 629 runs for Canterbury at an average of 62.90, characterised by firm driving and crisp square-cutting. He captained Canterbury in their first-class match against New Zealand Under-23 at the end of the season and dominated the match, scoring 226 of Canterbury's total of 396; New Zealand Under-23 made only 157 and 81. He was considered unlucky not to be selected for New Zealand's tour of India, Pakistan and England in 1965. His next three seasons were moderate, but his performances in 1968–69 "finally convinced everyone that Hastings was of international class".

Hastings played his club cricket in Christchurch for West Christchurch University Cricket Club, now known as Burnside West Christchurch University Cricket Club, as the person who gave him his job at The Press was playing for that club. Hastings would go on to have a significant role in the club and was made a life member.

=== International career ===
Hastings was the highest scorer in the 1968–69 Plunket Shield, with 432 runs at an average of 86.40 including two centuries, and scored another century for South Island against North Island in a trial match before the Test series against West Indies. Selected for the Test team for the first time, he scored 21 and 31 in the First Test. In the Second Test, New Zealand needed 164 to win, and were 40 for 3 at the end of the fourth day, but Hastings scored 62 not out, playing "handsome strokes to take New Zealand to their fifth victory in Test cricket". In the Third Test, after New Zealand followed on 200 behind, he played a "great, match-saving innings" of 117 not out. His aggregate for the New Zealand first-class season, 872 runs, was at the time the second-highest ever made by a New Zealand batsman.

Thereafter, Hastings was a fixture in the New Zealand middle order until 1975. "Time and again," Dick Brittenden noted, "he played his best cricket when it was most needed." He was also a fine fieldsman anywhere in the field, but especially in the gully, "where he brought off some amazing swooping catches".

In the low-scoring Second Test against Pakistan in 1969–70 Hastings scored 80 not out and 16, substantial contributions towards New Zealand's first Test victory over Pakistan. He scored 105 in the Third Test in the West Indies in 1971–72, adding 175 for the fourth wicket with Bevan Congdon; New Zealand went on to a 289-run first-innings lead, but were unable to convert it into victory.

In the Third Test against Pakistan in 1972–73, when New Zealand were struggling at 251 for 9 in reply to Pakistan's first innings of 402, Hastings made 110 and added a world Test record tenth-wicket partnership of 151 in 155 minutes with Richard Collinge to level the scores. In the Second Test in Sydney in 1973–74 he made a punishing 83 to set New Zealand up for a likely victory, only for the last day to be rained out. A few weeks later, in the Second Test at Christchurch, he made 46, adding 115 for the fourth wicket with Glenn Turner, as New Zealand pushed on to their first Test victory over Australia. Ken Wadsworth hit the winning runs and a spectator picked up the ball and ran off; Australian player Ian Redpath chased him down, retrieved the ball, and presented it to Hastings. This ball was presented by the Hastings family to Hagley Oval during the 2024 50th reunion. Hastings' last seven Test innings produced only 23 runs, bringing his overall average down from about 35 to 30.

== After cricket ==
Hastings worked as a manager with The Press in Christchurch for 38 years, retiring in the late 1990s. He then joined his former Test teammate Graham Vivian in his artificial turf supply business. Between 2000 and 2002, Hastings acted as a match referee in 10 Tests and 18 One Day Internationals. He also served as president of Canterbury Cricket, and president of Canterbury Park Trotting Club.

Hastings died at Parklands Retirement Village in the Christchurch suburb of Papanui, on 7 October 2024, at the age of 84.
