= David Donald =

David Donald may refer to:

- David Donald (cricketer) (1933–2016), New Zealand cricketer
- David Donald (footballer) (born 1987), Scottish football defender
- David Herbert Donald (1920–2009), American historian
- David Grahame Donald (1891–1976), RAF officer
