= Stuart Hay =

New Zealand cricketer and businessman

Personal information
- Full name: Stuart Carlton Hay
- Born: 6 October 1909; Auckland, New Zealand
- Died: 23 July 1987 (aged 77); Auckland, New Zealand
- Batting: Left-handed
- Relatives: Carlton Hay (father); Douglas Hay (uncle)

Domestic team information
- Years: Team
- 1931/32: Auckland
- Source: Cricinfo, 11 June 2016

Stuart Carlton Hay OBE (6 October 1909 – 23 July 1987) was a New Zealand sportsman and businessman.

Hay played two first-class cricket matches for Auckland during the 1931–32 season and rugby for the provincial side. In 1957 he succeeded his uncle Douglas Hay as chairman of the Eden Park Trust Board, serving until the 1970s.

Hay was born at Auckland in 1909, the son of sportsman Carlton Hay. His father and uncle had both played cricket for Auckland and worked in the family firm, Hendry and Hay stockbrokers. After being educated at Auckland Grammar School, Hay also joined the stock exchange in Auckland and later became chairman of the exchange and president of the New Zealand Stock Exchange Association. He was made an OBE for his professional work. Hay died at Auckland in 1987; an obituary was published in that year's New Zealand Cricket Almanack.
