= Ossie Cleal =

New Zealand cricketer and footballer

Personal information
- Full name: Osmond Charles Cleal
- Date of birth: 13 December 1916
- Place of birth: Auckland, New Zealand
- Date of death: 8 February 1977 (aged 60)
- Place of death: Auckland

Senior career*
Years	Team	Apps	(Gls)
- Metro College

International career
1936–1947	New Zealand	3	(0)
- * Club domestic league appearances and goals

Ossie Cleal
Cricket information
- Batting: Right-handed
- Bowling: Right-arm medium

Domestic team information
- Years: Team
- 1940/41–1951/52: Auckland

Career statistics
Competition	First-class
Matches	27
Runs scored	1,603
Batting average	36.43
100s/50s	0/11
Top score	98
Balls bowled	1,861
Wickets	19
Bowling average	35.52
5 wickets in innings	0
10 wickets in match	0
Best bowling	3/32
Catches/stumpings	26/–
- Source: CricketArchive, 4 November 2014

Osmond Charles Cleal (13 December 1916 – 8 February 1977) was an association football player who represented New Zealand at international level. He also played first-class cricket for Auckland from 1940 to 1952.

== Football career ==
Cleal made three appearances in official football internationals for the New Zealand, the first a 0–10 loss to Australia on 11 July 1936, a result which still stands as New Zealand's biggest loss in official matches, although New Zealand have been beaten by more in unofficial matches, notably by England Amateurs in 1937 and Manchester United in 1967.

War interrupted his playing career. New Zealand competed in no further official matches until South Africa toured in 1947, when Cleal played two further matches, a 5–6 loss on 28 June and a 0–6 loss on 5 July.

== Cricket career ==
Cleal made his first-class cricket debut in the 1940–41 season, scoring 58 and 98 in the middle order in two easy victories for Auckland. After serving as a sergeant and acting second lieutenant with the Second New Zealand Expeditionary Force in the Pacific, he resumed his career in the 1944–45 season. In three matches for Auckland he scored 30, 77 not out, 24, 58, 96 and 74 not out. At this stage of his career he had made 515 runs at an average of 84.37. However, when he was selected for North Island against South Island at the end of the season he made only 4 and 0.

After a few lean seasons he returned to form in 1949–50 when in four matches he made 344 runs at 43.00, including 45 and 45 (top score in each innings) for Auckland against the Australians. It was also his most successful season with his medium-pace: he took eight wickets at 20.87.

Cleal captained Auckland in 1950–51 and 1951–52. He was selected to play in the First Test against England in 1950–51 but had to withdraw from the team and was replaced by Tony MacGibbon. He retired after the 1951–52 season.

== Personal life ==
Cleal served overseas in World War II as an artillery sergeant with the 2nd New Zealand Expeditionary Force. He married Ailsa Mary Metcalfe in Auckland in November 1942. He worked as a warehouseman.
