= Colin Campbell (cricketer, born 1884) =

Scottish-born New Zealand cricketer

Personal information
- Born: 1884; Scotland
- Died: 3 February 1966 (aged 81–82); Hastings, New Zealand
- Role: Wicket-keeper

Domestic team information
- Years: Team
- 1920-21: Hawke's Bay

Career statistics
Competition	First-class
Matches	2
Runs scored	1
Batting average	1.00
100s/50s	0/0
Top score	1
Balls bowled	–
Wickets	–
Bowling average	–
5 wickets in innings	–
10 wickets in match	–
Best bowling	–
Catches/stumpings	2/0
- Source: Cricinfo, 14 November 2019

Colin Campbell (1884 – 3 February 1966) was a Scottish-born New Zealand cricketer who played two matches of first-class cricket in 1921 and 1922.

== Career ==
Campbell was a wicket-keeper who batted at number eleven. He played his first first-class match for Hawke's Bay against the touring Australians in February 1921. In Australia's only innings he took two catches and allowed 27 byes. It was Hawke's Bay's last match with first-class status. The next season he was selected to play for North Island against South Island when Richard Rowntree was unavailable. This time, Campbell allowed 45 byes in the match (out of South Island's combined two-innings total of 424) and took no catches. It was his last first-class match.
