= Jimmy Kemp (cricketer) =

New Zealand cricketer (1918–1994)

Personal information
- Full name: Raymond James Kemp
- Born: 6 April 1918; Wellington, New Zealand
- Died: 27 December 1994 (aged 76); Upper Hutt, New Zealand
- Batting: Right-handed

Domestic team information
- Years: Team
- 1945/46–1949/50: Wellington

Career statistics
Competition	First-class
Matches	8
Runs scored	413
Batting average	29.50
100s/50s	1/2
Top score	152
Catches/stumpings	1/–
- Source: Cricinfo, 30 December 2023

Raymond James Kemp (6 April 1918 – 27 December 1994) was a New Zealand cricketer who played first-class cricket for Wellington from 1946 to 1949.

Kemp was a right-handed batsman. He had his best season in 1947–48, when after scoring 209 not out, 143 and 279 in non-first-class matches for Hutt Valley he was selected to play in Wellington's last match of the Plunket Shield, and scored 152 against Auckland; he took part in consecutive century partnerships with Eric Dempster and Alan McLean. He was selected to represent the North Island later that season and made 59 and 5 in the North Island's narrow victory over the South Island.

Kemp played five first-class matches over the next two seasons without success. He continued to have success with Hutt Valley, helping them to win the Hawke Cup for the first time in December 1948 and retain it until April 1950.

Kemp served with the Royal New Zealand Air Force in World War II, stationed in the New Hebrides.
