= New Zealand Under-23 cricket team =

The New Zealand Under-23 cricket team played 12 matches of first-class cricket in New Zealand between the 1962–63 season and the 1980–81 season.

== History ==
The New Zealand Under-23s played a first-class match against a Plunket Shield team at the end of every season from 1962–63 to 1971–72, with the exception of 1967–68, when they did not play a first-class match, and 1969–70, when they played the touring Australian team. In 1976–77, 1977–78 and 1980–81, they played a Plunket Shield team early in the season, in December.

=== Matches ===
Individual centuries and five-wicket hauls are noted.

- Northern Districts v New Zealand Under-23s, Seddon Park, Hamilton, 22, 23, 24 March 1963. Northern Districts 175 and 205 (Arch Taylor 5 for 57); New Zealand Under-23s 137 (Gren Alabaster 8 for 30) and 124 (Tom Puna 5 for 36). Northern Districts won by 119 runs.
- Auckland v New Zealand Under-23s, Eden Park, Auckland, 28, 30, 31 March 1964. Auckland 326 and 290 for 7 dec. (Jonathan Parson 5 for 80); New Zealand Under-23s 342 (Peter Truscott 165) and 201 for 8. Drawn.
- Canterbury v New Zealand Under-23s, Lancaster Park, Christchurch, 8, 9 March 1965. New Zealand Under-23s 157 and 81 (Bryan Andrews 6 for 27); Canterbury 396 (Brian Hastings 226; Blair Furlong 6 for 115 including a hat-trick). Canterbury won by an innings and 158 runs.
- Wellington v New Zealand Under-23s, Basin Reserve, Wellington, 25, 26, 28 March 1966. New Zealand Under-23s 173 (Les Butler 8 for 50) and 229 (George McConnell 5 for 74); Wellington 251 and 153 for 9 (Rodney Redmond 6 for 56). Wellington won by one wicket.
- Central Districts v New Zealand Under-23s, Cook's Gardens, Wanganui, 24, 25, 27 February 1967. Central Districts 208 and 271 (John McIntyre 5 for 101); New Zealand Under-23s 140 and 126. Central Districts won by 213 runs.
- Auckland v New Zealand Under-23s, Eden Park, Auckland, 5, 7, 8 April 1969. Auckland 130 and 299 (Mark Burgess 115); New Zealand Under-23s 159 and 180 (Hedley Howarth 5 for 54). Auckland won by 90 runs.
- New Zealand Under-23s v Australians, McLean Park, Napier, 2, 3, 4 March 1970. New Zealand Under-23s 145 (Dennis Lillee 6 for 40) and 144; Australians 309 for 9 dec. Australians won by an innings and 20 runs.
- Auckland v New Zealand Under-23s, Cornwall Park, Auckland, Auckland, 7, 8, 9 February 1971. Auckland 274 for 8 dec. (Ross Morgan 102) and 212 for 6 dec.; New Zealand Under-23s 184 (Morgan 5 for 42) and 182. Auckland won by 120 runs.
- Otago v New Zealand Under-23s, Carisbrook, Dunedin, 4, 5, 6 February 1972. New Zealand Under-23s 159 (Gren Alabaster 5 for 51) and 117; Otago 336. Otago won by an innings and 60 runs.
- Auckland v New Zealand Under-23s, Cornwall Park, Auckland, 5, 6, 7 December 1976. Auckland 274 for 9 dec. and 233 for 3 dec.; New Zealand Under-23s 202 (Hedley Howarth 8 for 75) and 99. Auckland won by 206 runs.
- Otago v New Zealand Under-23s, Logan Park, Dunedin, 4, 5, 6 December 1977. Otago 313; New Zealand Under-23s 159 (Peter Petherick 6 for 44) and 202 for 3. Drawn.
- Canterbury v New Zealand Under-23s, Lancaster Park, Christchurch, 7, 9, 10 December 1980. New Zealand Under-23s 221 (David Stead 6 for 84) and 197 for 4; Canterbury 235. Drawn.

New Zealand Under-23s also played a number of one-day and two-day matches against non-first-class provincial teams.

=== Records ===
New Zealand Under-23s lost nine of their first-class matches and drew the other three. Their only century was Peter Truscott's 165 in 1963–64; their best bowling figures were Rodney Redmond's 6 for 56 in 1965–66.

Twenty-six New Zealand Under-23s players went on to represent New Zealand in Test cricket. In order of their first appearance for New Zealand Under-23s: Peter Truscott and Hedley Howarth from the 1962-63 team; Rodney Redmond, Mark Burgess, Keith Thomson and Bruce Taylor (1963–64); Glenn Turner, Richard Collinge and Dayle Hadlee (1966–67); John Morrison, Ken Wadsworth, Graham Vivian and Geoff Howarth (1968–69); Robert Anderson and Jeremy Coney (1971–72); John Wright, Jock Edwards, Bruce Edgar, Paul McEwan and John Reid (1976–77); Ian Smith, Evan Gray, Martin Snedden and Brendon Bracewell (1977–78); Trevor Franklin and Gary Robertson (1980–81). Six of them – Burgess, Turner, Geoff Howarth, Coney, Wright and Smith – went on to captain New Zealand in Tests.
