= Carlton Hay =

New Zealand cricketer

Personal information
- Full name: William Patrick Carlton Hay
- Born: 17 March 1875; Auckland, New Zealand
- Died: 15 April 1945 (aged 70); Auckland, New Zealand
- Relatives: Stuart Hay (son); Douglas Hay (brother)

Domestic team information
- Years: Team
- 1893/94: Auckland
- Source: ESPNcricinfo, 11 June 2016

William Patrick Carlton Hay (17 March 1875 – 15 April 1945) was a New Zealand sportsman and stockbroker. He played one first-class cricket match for Auckland during the 1893–94 season and played rugby and association football for the province.

Hay was born at Auckland in 1875 and was educated at Auckland Grammar School, as was his younger brother Douglas. After leaving school he worked at the Auckland Savings Bank before joining the firm of Hendry and Hay as a stockbroker. He was considered "well-known" at the Auckland stock exchange.

The eldest of three brothers, all of whom were sportsmen, Hay played cricket whilst at school. He was considered a "lively" batsman and an excellent fielder, described as "one of the finest cover point's Auckland has known". He was a representative rugby and soccer player and later became a respected sports administrator, serving as treasurer of the Auckland Cricket Association, secretary of the trustees of Eden Park, and as president of the Auckland Grammar School Old Boys Association.

Hay's son, Stuart Hay, also played cricket and rugby for Auckland and was chairman of the Auckland Stock Exchange.
