= Bill Tricklebank =

New Zealand cricketer

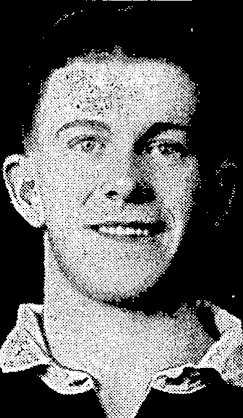
- Bill Tricklebank in 1935

Personal information
- Full name: William Tricklebank
- Born: 30 December 1915; Wellington, New Zealand
- Died: 15 May 1986 (aged 70); Hataitai, Wellington, New Zealand
- Batting: Right-handed
- Bowling: Right-arm fast-medium

Domestic team information
- Years: Team
- 1934-35 to 1936-37: Wellington

Career statistics
Competition	First-class
Matches	6
Runs scored	136
Batting average	19.42
100s/50s	0/0
Top score	47
Balls bowled	850
Wickets	12
Bowling average	36.91
5 wickets in innings	0
10 wickets in match	0
Best bowling	3/33
Catches/stumpings	5/–
- Source: Cricinfo, 12 December 2017

William Tricklebank (30 December 1915 – 15 May 1986) was a New Zealand cricketer who played first-class cricket for Wellington from 1934 to 1937. He also played rugby union.

Bill Tricklebank was educated at Wellington College, then went to Victoria University College, where he played cricket and rugby for the university’s teams in Wellington senior club competition.

An opening bowler and useful lower-order batsman, Tricklebank was the leading bowler in Wellington cricket in 1933-34 with 60 wickets at an average of 12.83. Early next season, just before his 19th birthday, he made his first-class debut for Wellington, taking four wickets in a victory over Otago in the first match of the 1934-35 Plunket Shield. He played all three matches in the Shield and at the end of the season was selected to play for North Island against South Island, again taking four wickets.

Tricklebank missed most of the 1935-36 cricket season, as he was touring Japan as one of the backs in the New Zealand Universities rugby team. Playing at full-back, he represented North Island Universities against South Island Universities in 1936. He played two more first-class cricket matches for Wellington in 1936-37, but with only moderate success.

Tricklebank married Joan Esme Dunn in Wellington on 5 December 1940. He served overseas in the New Zealand Army as a lieutenant in World War II.
