= Ronald Murray (disambiguation) =

Ronald Murray (born 1979) is an American basketball player.

Ronald or Ron Murray may also refer to:

- Ron Murray (cricketer) (1927–1951), New Zealand cricketer
- Ron Murray (footballer) (1939–2023), Australian rules footballer
- Ronald King Murray, Lord Murray (1922–2016), Scottish Labour Party politician and judge
- Ronald Murray (rugby union), Scottish rugby union player from the 1930s
