= Maurice Ryan =

New Zealand cricketer

Personal information
- Full name: Maurice Lloyd Ryan
- Born: 7 June 1943; Christchurch, New Zealand
- Died: 12 August 2011 (aged 68); Sydney, Australia
- Batting: Right-handed
- Bowling: Right-arm off-spin

Domestic team information
- Years: Team
- 1965/66–1966/67: Canterbury
- 1967/68–1969/70: Central Districts
- 1970/71–1978/79: Canterbury

Career statistics
Competition	First-class	List A
Matches	66	16
Runs scored	3,022	276
Batting average	29.05	21.23
100s/50s	3/18	0/1
Top score	129	76
Balls bowled	2,250	64
Wickets	33	0
Bowling average	21.39	–
5 wickets in innings	0	–
10 wickets in match	0	–
Best bowling	4/34	–
Catches/stumpings	87/11	12/2
- Source: Cricinfo, 16 November 2018

Maurice Lloyd Ryan (7 June 1943 – 12 August 2011) was a New Zealand cricketer who played first-class cricket for Canterbury and Central Districts from 1965 to 1979.

Maurice Ryan was a versatile cricketer: an opening or middle-order batsman and accurate off-spin bowler who later in his career became a wicketkeeper and a successful captain. In January 1971, opening for Canterbury, he made two first-class centuries three days apart: 110 on the first day of the match against Northern Districts on 12 January, then 129 on the first day against Auckland on 15 January. In February 1967 he scored 35 and 58 against the Australian tourists, playing a major part in Canterbury's victory, the first time any team in New Zealand had defeated the Australian team in a first-class match.

Ryan represented both North Island and South Island, and played for New Zealand in the Australian one-day competition in 1971-72, but never quite made the New Zealand Test team. He captained Canterbury from 1976-77 to 1978-79. They won the national one-day competition in 1976-77 and 1977-78.

He was chairman of the board of Canterbury Cricket from 1998 to 2000, after which he moved to Sydney.
