= David Donald (cricketer) =

New Zealand cricketer

Personal information
- Full name: David Lindsay Donald
- Born: 20 July 1933; Palmerston North, New Zealand
- Died: 3 October 2016 (aged 83); Tauranga, New Zealand
- Batting: Right-handed

Domestic team information
- Years: Team
- 1957/58–1960/61: Northern Districts

Career statistics
Competition	First-class
Matches	21
Runs scored	930
Batting average	23.25
100s/50s	1/6
Top score	106
Balls bowled	2
Wickets	0
Bowling average	–
5 wickets in innings	–
10 wickets in match	–
Best bowling	–
Catches/stumpings	14/–
- Source: Cricinfo, 10 November 2018

David Lindsay Donald (20 July 1933 – 3 October 2016) was a New Zealand cricketer who played first-class cricket for Northern Districts from 1957 to 1961.

An opening batsman, David Donald had his best season in 1958–59, when he scored 382 runs in the Plunket Shield at an average of 38.20. Only two players scored more: the Test captain John Reid for Wellington, and Northern Districts' number four, Bruce Pairaudeau. Donald made his only first-class century in the match against Canterbury, which was one of only four centuries in the competition that season. Considered for the Test team, he was selected for North Island in the trial match against South Island towards the end of the season, and although he made 71, the highest score of the match, he was not selected in the two-match Test series against England that followed. At the time, the cricket correspondent of The Press thought his indifferent fielding and running between wickets may have been factors in his missing Test selection.

Donald also played Hawke Cup cricket for several North Island teams in the 1950s and 1960s, including Waikato during their championship defence in 1957–58.

He and his wife Margaret had two sons. He died in Tauranga in October 2016, aged 83.
