= Graham Gedye =

New Zealand cricketer (1929–2014)

Personal information
- Full name: Sydney Graham Gedye
- Born: 2 May 1929; Ōtāhuhu, Auckland, New Zealand
- Died: 10 August 2014 (aged 85); Auckland
- Batting: Right-handed
- Relatives: Arnold Gedye (father)

International information
- National side: New Zealand (1964–1965)
- Test debut (cap 98): 21 February 1964 v South Africa
- Last Test: 22 January 1965 v Pakistan

Domestic team information
- Years: Team
- 1956/57–1964/65: Auckland

Career statistics
Competition	Test	First-class
Matches	4	45
Runs scored	193	2,387
Batting average	24.12	30.21
100s/50s	0/2	3/13
Top score	55	104
Catches/stumpings	0/–	19/–
- Source: Cricinfo, 1 April 2017

Sydney Graham Gedye (2 May 1929 – 10 August 2014) was a New Zealand Test cricketer who played first-class cricket for Auckland from 1956–57 to 1964–65. He was the 98th Test cap for New Zealand.

== Cricket career ==
Gedye was born in Auckland, where he went to school at Otahuhu College. His father, Arnold Gedye, played two first-class matches for Wellington in the 1919–20 season.

A right-handed opening batsman, Gedye made his debut for Auckland in 1956-57 and played unobtrusively for several seasons with a top score of 88 before coming into prominence with two centuries in the match against Central Districts in 1963–64.

That performance propelled him into the New Zealand Test team for the three-match series against South Africa. He made 10 and a match-saving 52 in around 70 overs in the First Test, and 18 and 55 in the Third Test. His 166 runs at an average of 27.66 placed him third in the New Zealanders' averages and aggregates for the series.

He retained his spot in the Test team the following season after another century in a victory over Central Districts, but after the First Test against Pakistan, in which he scored 26 in 160 minutes, he was dropped. When he then failed to be selected for the tours to India, Pakistan and England in 1965, he retired from first-class cricket.

Gedye and Roger Harris opened the batting together in several hundred games for their club in Auckland and for Auckland in the Plunket Shield. Gedye also played rugby for Auckland.
