= Andrew Reinholds =

New Zealand cricketer (born 1967)

Andrew Terence Reinholds (born 11 November 1967) is a former New Zealand cricketer who played for the Auckland Aces in the mid-1990s and he also played for North Island in the Plunket Shield. He was born in Wellington.

== See also ==
- List of Auckland representative cricketers
