= Arnold Gedye =

New Zealand cricketer

Personal information
- Full name: Arnold Ernest Gedye
- Born: 23 February 1887; Auckland, New Zealand
- Died: 31 December 1976 (aged 89); Auckland, New Zealand
- Relatives: Graham Gedye (son)

Domestic team information
- Years: Team
- 1919/20: Wellington
- Source: Cricinfo, 24 October 2020

Arnold Ernest Gedye (23 February 1887 – 31 December 1976) was a New Zealand cricketer. He played in two first-class matches for Wellington during the 1919–20 season. His son Graham Gedye played Test cricket for New Zealand in the 1960s.

Gedye was born at Auckland in 1887 and played cricket in the city for Parnell Cricket Club where he was considered a promising batsman. He worked for the New Zealand Railways Department and was transferred to the Wellington area in 1919. In Wellington he played club cricket for Petone Cricket Club and played in two first-class matches in January 1920. On debut against Canterbury at the Basin Reserve he made scores of one and 17, before scoring three and eight against Auckland at Eden Park later in the month.

After moving back to Auckland during the 1920s, Gedye played club cricket for Ellerslie, scoring a double century in league cricket during the 1926–27 season. He died in the city in 1976 at the age of 89.
