= Stewart Speed =

New Zealand cricketer (1942–2020)

Personal information
- Full name: Stewart Raymond Speed
- Born: 13 September 1942; Auckland, New Zealand
- Died: 22 June 2020 (aged 77); Whangārei, New Zealand
- Batting: Right-handed
- Role: Wicket-keeper

Domestic team information
- Years: Team
- 1962/63–1970/71: Auckland

Career statistics
Competition	First-class
Matches	33
Runs scored	904
Batting average	25.11
100s/50s	0/4
Top score	88
Catches/stumpings	61/12
- Source: ESPNcricinfo, 16 January 2021

Stewart Raymond Speed (13 September 1942 – 22 June 2020) was a New Zealand cricketer. He played first-class cricket for Auckland between 1962 and 1971.

Speed was a wicketkeeper-batsman, noted for the timing and elegance of his batting, who played some valuable innings in adversity. His highest score was 88 in 1964-65 when, going to the crease with Auckland's score at 99 for 6 in reply to Canterbury's first innings of 349, he took the total to 258. In 1969-70 he went in at 49 for 4 and scored 76 out of a team total of 162 against Otago.

He was Auckland's wicket-keeper when they won the Plunket Shield in 1968–69. He played in two matches for North Island late in the season, but was not selected for the New Zealand team in the Tests against the West Indies that followed, or for the tour of England in 1969.

The SR Speed Trophy is awarded annually to the wicket-keeper who makes the most dismissals in Auckland senior cricket. Speed died in Whangarei Hospital in June 2020, aged 77. He was survived by his wife and their three daughters.
