= Prof =

Prof may refer to:

- Prof., or professor, an academic rank
- Prof (rapper) (born 1984), American rapper
- Prof Edwards (born 1940), Barbadian cricketer
- .prof, a top-level domain
