= John Morris (New Zealand cricketer) =

New Zealand cricketer

Personal information
- Full name: John Bentham Morris
- Born: 9 January 1933; Paddington, London, England
- Died: 9 January 1970 (aged 37); Auckland, New Zealand
- Batting: Right-handed

Domestic team information
- Years: Team
- 1951/52–1956/57: Auckland

Career statistics
Competition	First-class
Matches	23
Runs scored	1,021
Batting average	25.52
100s/50s	2/3
Top score	103
Balls bowled	48
Wickets	1
Bowling average	28.00
5 wickets in innings	0
10 wickets in match	0
Best bowling	1/7
Catches/stumpings	11/–
- Source: ESPNcricinfo, 29 December 2020

John Bentham Morris (9 January 1933 – 9 January 1970) was a New Zealand cricketer and orthopaedic surgeon.

== Life and career ==
Morris was born in London in January 1933, the son of an orthopaedic surgeon, and his family moved to New Zealand when he was a boy. He was educated at King's College, Auckland, and the University of Otago, where he graduated in medicine in 1956. He furthered his orthopaedic training in the UK and the US before returning to New Zealand and taking up the position of orthopaedic surgeon at Middlemore Hospital in Auckland. He and his Middlemore Hospital colleague Ross Nicholson (1922–2013) pioneered hip replacement surgery in New Zealand. He died of illness in January 1970, survived by his wife and their three children.

Morris played 23 first-class cricket matches for Auckland between 1951 and 1957. A right-handed middle-order batsman, described as "an exciting stylist", he scored 45 and 103 in Auckland's victory over Wellington in the 1953–54 Plunket Shield. His other first-class century was 101 not out in Auckland's victory over Central Districts in the 1952–53 Plunket Shield. He was Auckland's leading scorer in the 1954–55 Plunket Shield, with 280 runs at an average of 35.00. He played for North Island in a trial match before the Test series against England in 1954–55 and scored 34, but was not selected for the Test team.
