= Jonathan Parson =

New Zealand cricketer and businessman

Personal information
- Full name: Jonathan St John Parson
- Born: 12 April 1942 (age 84); Napier, Hawke's Bay, New Zealand
- Batting: Right-handed
- Bowling: Right-arm fast-medium

Domestic team information
- Years: Team
- 1960-61: Canterbury
- 1961-62: Wellington

Career statistics
Competition	First-class
Matches	8
Runs scored	49
Batting average	4.90
100s/50s	0/0
Top score	15
Balls bowled	1195
Wickets	26
Bowling average	20.61
5 wickets in innings	1
10 wickets in match	0
Best bowling	5/80
Catches/stumpings	9/0
- Source: Cricinfo, 9 July 2020

Jonathan St John Parson (born 12 April 1942) is a New Zealand cricketer and businessman who played first-class cricket from 1961 to 1964.

Jonathan Parson was a right-arm fast-medium bowler. He played one match for Canterbury in the 1960–61 season when he was 18. Shortly afterwards he moved to Wellington, for whom he played five matches in 1961–62, when Wellington won the Plunket Shield. Sparingly used, he took 11 wickets at an average of 20.00.

He was most successful in the two first-class matches he played for the New Zealand Under-23 team, taking seven wickets against Northern Districts in 1962-63 and six against Auckland in 1963–64, when he took his best figures of 5 for 80 in the second innings. However, despite this success and the fact that he was still only 21, it was his last first-class match.

He and his two sons run a business in Whanganui that designs and manufactures outdoor furniture.
