= David Wilson (New Zealand cricketer) =

New Zealand cricketer (1914–1989)

Personal information
- Full name: David Stuart Wilson
- Born: 13 October 1914; Wellington, New Zealand
- Died: 6 April 1989 (aged 74); Wellington, New Zealand
- Batting: Right-handed
- Bowling: Left-arm fast-medium
- Role: All-rounder

Domestic team information
- Years: Team
- 1935–36 to 1948–49: Wellington

Career statistics
Competition	First-class
Matches	25
Runs scored	1158
Batting average	25.53
100s/50s	0/6
Top score	90
Balls bowled	4,550
Wickets	65
Bowling average	29.67
5 wickets in innings	2
10 wickets in match	0
Best bowling	6/44
Catches/stumpings	19/–
- Source: Cricinfo, 11 November 2022

David Stuart Wilson (13 October 1914 – 6 April 1989) was a New Zealand cricketer. He played in 24 first-class matches for Wellington from 1935 to 1949.

Wilson was an all-rounder, a left-arm fast-medium bowler and middle-order or lower-order batsman. His best bowling figures were 6 for 44 for Wellington against Auckland in the 1946–47 Plunket Shield, when he also scored 33 in each innings. He made his highest score of 90 in the next match a week later, against Canterbury. He played for North Island in 1947–48.

Wilson served in the New Zealand Army during World War Two. He was promoted to the rank of lieutenant in December 1942.
