= English cricket team in New Zealand in 1958–59 =

International cricket tour

The England national cricket team toured New Zealand in February and March 1959 and played a two-match Test series against the New Zealand national cricket team. England won the series 1–0 with one match drawn. Three first-class matches against provincial sides were also played, of which the English team (playing as Marylebone Cricket Club) won two by an innings, and the other was drawn.

The English team had just completed a five-Test tour of Australia. Of the 18 players on that tour, six were injured and unable to take part in the New Zealand tour.

== Test series summary ==
=== First Test ===
27 February–2 March 1959
(4-day match)
Scorecard

England	v	New Zealand
374 (142.1 overs); ER Dexter 141 (292); JR Reid 3/34 (18.1 overs)		142 (72.5 overs); JR Reid 40 (73); GAR Lock 5/31 (26 overs)
		133 (f/o) (72.2 overs); JW Guy 56 (127); GAR Lock 6/53 (28.2 overs)

England won by an innings and 99 runs
Lancaster Park, Christchurch
Umpires: J Cowie and EWT Tindill

- England won the toss and elected to bat.
- 1 March was taken as a rest day.
- The match was scheduled for four days but completed in three.
- BA Bolton, RM Harris and KW Hough (all NZ) made their Test debuts.

=== Second Test ===
14–18 March 1959
(4-day match)
Scorecard

New Zealand	v	England
181 (89.3 overs); B Sutcliffe 61 (131); ER Dexter 3/23 (19 overs)		311/7 (118 overs); PBH May 124*; KW Hough 3/79 (38 overs)

Match drawn
Eden Park, Auckland
Umpires: J Cowie and RWR Shortt

- New Zealand won the toss and elected to bat.
- 15 March was taken as a rest day.
- There was no play on the third or fourth days.
