= Hutt Valley cricket team =

New Zealand cricket team

Personnel
- Owner: Hutt Valley Cricket Association

Team information
- Founded: 1928
- Dissolved: 1999
- Home ground: Hutt Recreation Ground, Lower Hutt

History
- Hawke Cup wins: 4

The Hutt Valley cricket team represented the Hutt Valley in the Wellington Region of New Zealand between 1928 and 1999. It competed in the Hawke Cup, which it won four times. Cricket in the area is now part of Cricket Wellington.

== History ==
Cricket was played in the Hutt Valley in the early 1860s, when a Wellington team travelled to Hutt and defeated a Country Districts team in a match played "in Mr. P. Laing's paddock". The first Hutt Valley Cricket Association was formed early in 1899 by delegates from the Petone, Waiwetu, Western Hutt and Johnsonville clubs. They agreed that matches should be arranged against Wellington and Wairarapa. In the first match, held in Greytown later that season, Wairarapa beat Hutt Valley by 72 runs. In the first season, 1899–1900, Petone United were premiers, while Waiwetu, Koro Koro, Western Hutt, St Augustine's and Upper Hutt also competed.

The association lapsed after a few seasons and was not revived until 1928. It was affiliated with the New Zealand Cricket Council in 1947, thus becoming eligible to compete in the Hawke Cup.

Players from Hutt Valley were always eligible to play for Wellington in the Plunket Shield. In their first Hawke Cup match, an elimination match in December 1947, Hutt Valley defeated Wairarapa, the Wellington representative Jimmy Kemp scoring 209 not out and Cedric Muir taking 12 wickets. This success qualified Hutt Valley to play in the challenge matches in 1948–49. In their first challenge match, against Wanganui in December 1948, their batting, led by Kemp and John Reid, another Wellington player, who shortly afterwards made his Test cricket debut, took them to victory. Hutt Valley then resisted several challenges until Hawke's Bay defeated them in April 1950.

Hutt Valley next won the Hawke Cup in 1955–56, when their captain, Ian Upston, took 14 wickets in the match against Wanganui. Their third victory came against Nelson in 1967–68, when George McConnell took 12 wickets and made 60 in the first innings, the only fifty in the match. They won their fourth and last victory in a high-scoring match against Nelson in 1995–96, when the captain, Selwyn Blackmore, scored 146 opening the batting.

Many Hutt Valley players represented Wellington in the Plunket Shield. Aside from John Reid, who captained the Test team from 1956 to 1965, a number of players also represented New Zealand in Test cricket during their careers with Hutt Valley. They included Bob Blair, Bruce Morrison, Artie Dick and Ewen Chatfield.

The Hutt Valley Cricket Association and the Wellington Cricket Association amalgamated in 1999, thus ending Hutt Valley's independent existence and its participation in the Hawke Cup. Several teams from Hutt Valley now compete in the senior Wellington competitions.
