= Mark Hastings =

New Zealand cricketer (1968–2022)

Personal information
- Full name: Mark Andrew Hastings
- Born: 8 May 1968; Christchurch, New Zealand
- Died: 17 March 2022 (aged 53); Christchurch, New Zealand
- Batting: Right-handed
- Bowling: Right-arm medium
- Relatives: Brian Hastings (father)
- Source: Cricinfo, 30 September 2016

Mark Andrew Hastings (8 May 1968 – 17 March 2022) was a New Zealand cricketer. He played ten first-class matches for Canterbury between 1992 and 2001. He was also part of New Zealand's squad for the 1988 Youth Cricket World Cup.
