= Tim Selwyn =

New Zealand political activist

Tim Selwyn (born 1974, Takapuna) is a New Zealand political activist who was found guilty of sedition on 8 June 2006, the first person charged with sedition in New Zealand for more than 30 years. He is also editor of Tumeke! magazine, and has a blog with the same name.

He was sentenced to two months imprisonment for sedition and for conspiracy to commit wilful damage on 19 July 2006. Letters he wrote from prison were posted on his blog, prompting criticism and questions in Parliament from National's Corrections spokesman Simon Power. Selwyn was also investigated by other government agencies after his initial arrest and was sentenced to a further 15 months for dishonesty offences against various government departments involving his theft of the identity of a dead baby and several other dead people, among other offences, - and a further 25 months for tax offences (on 14 February 2007). He was released from prison in October 2007.

Selwyn has previously attracted controversy. In 1996, he was imprisoned (but then released on appeal of sentence) for falsifying nomination signatures and was forced to resign as a member of the Glenfield Community Board, to which he had been elected unopposed the previous year. He also wrote articles in Craccum criticising suicide prevention workers and explaining how to rip off the student loan system; the former being condemned by the New Zealand Press Council in a ruling as "consistently irresponsible and malicious." - a decision Selwyn later criticised as "ill-considered and hypocritical." Selwyn has previously been a member of the ACT Party, but more recently has supported the Māori Party.

== Sedition controversy ==
Selwyn was arrested on charges of sedition and wilful damage in relation to throwing an axe through the Auckland electorate office window of then-Prime Minister Helen Clark over the foreshore and seabed controversy on 18 November 2004. He pleaded guilty to being party to a conspiracy to commit wilful damage in 2005 and said "Intentional damage is one thing, but attempting to criminalise speech and conscience is quite another... If the Crown is intent on using war-time offences to subdue people who oppose the government theft of native property and rights then they are opening the door to Pandora's box."

Sedition is defined within New Zealand as being "speech, writing or behaviour intended to encourage rebellion or resistance against the government". Selwyn was charged under section 81(1)(c) of the New Zealand Crimes Act 1961, which forbids any publication which intends to "incite, procure, or encourage violence, lawlessness, or disorder". The New Zealand Police cite the pamphlet Confiscation Day as being seditious.

Selwyn admitted being in the vicinity of the electorate office that morning, and that he participated in the composition and distribution of both versions of the statements which explained that the protest was a symbolic act and also called upon "like-minded New Zealanders" (in the Confiscation Day statement) to take "similar action" of their own. During his trial Selwyn refused to answer questions concerning the other people involved.

Selwyn appealed against the sedition conviction, calling the decision "dangerous and undemocratic" and having serious implications for freedom of speech . However, Judge Josephine Bouchier said when summing up that Selwyn knew the documents were unlawful and intended to encourage lawlessness and disorder, and the police were quoted as saying the verdict was a "victory for society".

Selwyn's appeal was dismissed by the Court of Appeal on 4 April 2007 - the day before the NZ Law Commission, chaired by former Prime Minister, Sir Geoffrey Palmer, released its report into seditious offences. The report recommended a complete repeal. The report said the current law was "an unjustifiable breach of the right of freedom of expression" and that "they have been inappropriately used in New Zealand in times of political unrest and perceived threats to established authority. They have been used to fetter vehement and unpopular political speech. The time has come to remove the seditious offences from the New Zealand statute book."

After much criticism of the sedition prosecution the Green Party, United Future, Act, and the Māori Party committed themselves to abolition and a bill based on the Law Commission's findings was introduced to parliament with the government's backing on 8 June 2007 that would repeal all seditious offences from 1 January 2008. During debate on the bill the Justice Minister Mark Burton described Selwyn's case as "famous, and some would say infamous" and Māori Party MP Hone Harawira said of Selwyn's situation: "The Government passes legislation to steal away people’s rights and then it charges people with sedition for daring to oppose such theft... for daring to speak up for the Treaty... and for daring to speak out for human rights." His colleague Tariana Turia read out the full text of Confiscation Day in parliament. The bill was passed 114–7 (New Zealand First against) on 24 October 2007.
