= George McConnell (cricketer) =

New Zealand cricketer (1938–2019)

Personal information
- Full name: George Thomas McConnell
- Born: 3 January 1938; Innisfail, Queensland, Australia
- Died: 9 April 2019 (aged 81); Tauranga, Bay of Plenty, New Zealand
- Batting: Right-handed
- Bowling: Right-arm off-spin

Domestic team information
- Years: Team
- 1960–61 to 1971–72: Wellington

Career statistics
Competition	FC	List A
Matches	18	3
Runs scored	221	3
Batting average	14.73	3.00
100s/50s	0/0	0/0
Top score	38	3
Balls bowled	3065	192
Wickets	50	5
Bowling average	21.96	14.80
5 wickets in innings	4	0
10 wickets in match	0	n/a
Best bowling	6/41	2/16
Catches/stumpings	15/–	0/–
- Source: Cricinfo, 7 September 2017

George Thomas McConnell (3 January 1938 – 9 April 2019) was a New Zealand cricketer who played first-class cricket for Wellington from 1961 to 1971.

George McConnell's family moved from Australia to New Zealand when he was a boy, and he attended Hutt Valley High School. A tall off-spin bowler and hard-hitting lower-order batsman, McConnell had his best first-class season in 1961–62, when he took 20 wickets at an average of 13.30. In Wellington's first match that season he took 3 for 13 and 6 for 41 (his best bowling figures) and made 38 (his highest score) in an innings victory over Otago.

McConnell also played Hawke Cup cricket for Hutt Valley from 1960 to 1975. In 1967–68 he played a leading part in Hutt Valley's title-winning victory over Nelson, when he took 6 for 21 and 6 for 57 and, batting at number eight, made 60, the only fifty on either side in the match.
