= Bruce Bolton =

New Zealand cricketer (born 1935)

Personal information
- Full name: Bruce Alfred Bolton
- Born: 21 May 1935 (age 91); Christchurch, New Zealand
- Batting: Right-handed
- Bowling: Legbreak

International information
- National side: New Zealand (1959)
- Test debut (cap 85): 27 February 1959 v England
- Last Test: 14 March 1959 v England

Domestic team information
- Years: Team
- 1955/56–1964/65: Canterbury
- 1966/67–1970/71: Wellington

Career statistics
Competition	Test	First-class
Matches	2	61
Runs scored	59	2,092
Batting average	19.66	20.31
100s/50s	0/0	1/6
Top score	33	138
Balls bowled	–	5,253
Wickets	–	96
Bowling average	–	22.33
5 wickets in innings	–	3
10 wickets in match	–	0
Best bowling	–	7/23
Catches/stumpings	1/–	24/–
- Source: Cricinfo, 1 April 2017

Bruce Alfred Bolton (born 31 May 1935) is a former New Zealand cricketer who played in two Test matches during the 1958–59 season.

== Cricket career ==
Bolton was born at Christchurch and attended Christchurch Boys' High School. A right-handed opening batsman and useful leg-spin bowler, he played for almost 10 years for Canterbury in New Zealand domestic cricket and then, after a year's break, for a further five seasons for Wellington.

Bolton made his first-class debut in the 1955–56 season, but was not successful then or in his next first-class season, 1957–58. Then, in Canterbury's first two matches of the 1958–59 Plunket Shield season he made 79, 29, 74 and 49, top-scoring for Canterbury three times. He was brought into the New Zealand cricket team for the two Tests against the touring England team at the end of the season. In the first match, which New Zealand lost by an innings, Bolton did well, scoring 33 in the first innings, when he was sixth man out after more than three hours at the crease, and 26 in the second innings. In his second Test, he was run out for 0 in a match that was ended after two days because of rain. He did not bowl in either of his two Tests.

Bolton's one first-class century came the following season, with 138 against Northern Districts, when he shared a first-wicket stand of 214 with future Test captain Graham Dowling. His career best bowling came two seasons later, in 1961–62, with 7 for 23 against Central Districts, in a season when he took only eight wickets in all matches.

Bolton moved to Wellington in 1966. Playing for Wellington, he batted further down the order, and in 1969–70 he captained the side.
