= Douglas Hay =

New Zealand cricketer (1876–1967)

Douglas Hay OBE
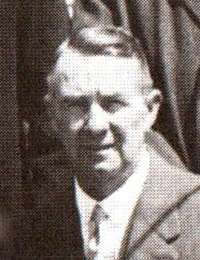
- Hay in 1927

Personal information
- Full name: Thomas Douglas Baird Hay
- Born: 31 August 1876; Auckland, New Zealand
- Died: 19 April 1967 (aged 90); Auckland, New Zealand
- Batting: Right-handed

Domestic team information
- Years: Team
- 1893/94–1906/07: Auckland

Career statistics
Competition	First-class
Matches	25
Runs scored	689
Batting average	16.02
100s/50s	1/2
Top score	144
Balls bowled	1066
Wickets	19
Bowling average	23.36
5 wickets in innings	1
10 wickets in match	0
Best bowling	5/10
Catches/stumpings	9/–
- Source: CricketArchive, 31 January 2015

Thomas Douglas Baird Hay OBE (31 August 1876 – 19 April 1967) was a New Zealand cricketer who played first-class cricket for Auckland from 1893 to 1907. He was later a cricket administrator and a prominent Auckland sharebroker.

== Playing career ==
A middle-order, and later opening, batsman and occasional bowler, Hay made his first-class debut for Auckland in 1893–94 aged 17. In 1894-95 he made 55, the highest score of the match, when Auckland beat Hawke's Bay by five wickets. Apart from that innings his record was modest in his early years, and he made only 228 runs at an average of 12.66 in 11 matches over six seasons. Nevertheless, he played for a New Zealand XV against the touring Australians in 1896–97, batting at number nine and scoring 10 and 4. He took 5 for 10 off nine overs to finish off the Wellington first innings later that season.

Then, in 1900–01, he was the highest scorer in New Zealand, with 292 runs at 41.71. Early in January 1901, opening the batting against Canterbury, he made 37 and 60 (Auckland's top score) then, a few days later, he made 144 and 20 not out against Wellington.

Auckland in January 1904, Hay at right in the middle row

Hay's 144 was Auckland's first century in their 38th match of first-class cricket. After Wellington had made 397 in their first innings, Auckland lost wickets steadily and were 112 for 7 at one stage. Hay "took over two hours to make his first 50, [but] in the next hour and a-half rattled on nearly double that number ... just when Auckland's plight seemed hopeless, he let out in most brilliant style and found the boundary time after time with powerful drives and leg strokes ... his 144 was a remarkable display of defence combined with hitting". Having gone in first, he was last out with Auckland's total at 262.

After those few days of success he returned to his previous form, and in 10 first-class matches after 1900-01 he made only 169 runs at 9.38. He was selected for New Zealand in two matches against Lord Hawke's visiting English team in 1902–03, but made only 28 runs in four innings. He captained North Island against South Island in 1903–04, and played his last game for Auckland in 1906–07.

== Later life ==
Hay was chairman and one of the original trustees of the Eden Park Trust Board. He managed the first New Zealand team to tour England, in 1927. After 20 years out of the first-class game, and at the age of 50, he played in the minor first-class match against Royal Navy, batting at number 11 and scoring 2 not out. At 33 years and 176 days from first match to last, his career is the longest in New Zealand first-class cricket.

He was a member of the Auckland Stock Exchange for 62 years. In the 1957 New Year Honours he was appointed an Officer of the Order of the British Empire for services to sport. He and his wife Ethna, who died in 1956, had three sons.

Hay died in Auckland in 1967 and his ashes were buried at Purewa Cemetery.
