= Roger Harris (cricketer) =

New Zealand cricketer (1933–2025)

Personal information
- Full name: Roger Meredith Harris
- Born: 27 July 1933; Ōtāhuhu, Auckland, New Zealand
- Died: 10 October 2025 (aged 92); Auckland, New Zealand
- Batting: Right-handed
- Bowling: Right-arm medium

International information
- National side: New Zealand (1959)
- Test debut (cap 86): 27 February 1959 v England
- Last Test: 14 March 1959 v England

Domestic team information
- Years: Team
- 1955/56–1973/74: Auckland

Career statistics
Competition	Test	FC	LA
Matches	2	73	4
Runs scored	31	3,863	134
Batting average	10.33	30.90	33.50
100s/50s	0/0	3/21	0/2
Top score	13	157	62
Balls bowled	–	1,391	124
Wickets	–	14	6
Bowling average	–	42.50	7.16
5 wickets in innings	–	0	0
10 wickets in match	–	0	0
Best bowling	–	4/105	3/9
Catches/stumpings	0/–	48/–	2/–
- Source: ESPNcricinfo, 11 July 2021

Roger Meredith Harris (27 July 1933 – 10 October 2025) was a New Zealand cricketer who played in two Test matches in 1959.

== Biography ==
A right-handed opening batsman and occasional medium pace bowler, Harris played first-class cricket for Auckland from 1955–56 to 1973–74. He made his first century in the opening match of the 1957–58 season, reaching 100 in 178 minutes and going on to make 111 on the last day of Auckland's close victory over Canterbury. In the 1958–59 Plunket Shield season, he made 329 runs at an average of 36.55. He was selected to open New Zealand's batting against England in the two Tests at the end of the season, he and his opening partner Bruce Bolton both making their Test debuts. He was not successful against England's pace bowlers, scoring 31 runs in the two matches, and played no further Tests.

In first-class cricket, Harris's top score was 157 for Auckland against Northern Districts in 1969–70. Late in his career, he was an effective all-rounder in the early years of one-day cricket in New Zealand.

Harris and Graham Gedye opened the batting together in several hundred games for Papatoetoe Cricket Club and for Auckland in the Plunket Shield. They continued the partnership playing lawn bowls together for 30 more years.

Harris died on 10 October 2025, at the age of 92. At the time of his death, he was the oldest living Auckland first-class cricketer.
