= Mirosław Złotkowski =

Polish wrestler

Personal information
- Nickname: Miro
- Born: 23 June 1956 Białystok, Poland
- Died: 24 March 2006 (aged 49) Christchurch, New Zealand

Sport
- Sport: Greco-Roman wrestling, Freestyle wrestling
- Club: MZKS Jelenia Góra (Poland) 1972-1978; Bryndwr YMCA (New Zealand) 1991; Crichton Cobbers (New Zealand) 1991-1992

Mirosław Złotkowski (23 June 1956 – 24 March 2006) was a Polish Greco-Roman wrestler who changed to Freestyle wrestling after emigrating to New Zealand.

He was among the most promising young wrestlers in Poland, where he represented the MZKS Jelenia Góra club, in mid to late 1970s, frequently finishing in the top three at national tournaments. He was also member of the training squad for the 1980 Olympics but due to personal circumstances decided to temporarily retire from the sport.

After a lengthily pause he resumed wrestling in New Zealand. In 1991 he joined the Bryndwr YMCA and Crichton Cobbers clubs in Christchurch, where he was trained by Steve Yarbrough. He won gold at the New Zealand national wrestling championship in July 1991 and a bronze medal at the IV Commonwealth Wrestling Championship, in Dunedin, in October 1991, both in the 100 – 130 kg category. He also won the National Tauranga Highland Games in the Open Division in March 1992.

He died on 24 March 2006 of bile duct cancer, and was buried at Sydenham Cemetery.

== Notable achievements ==
| Year | Tournament | Venue | Category | Rank |
|---|---|---|---|---|
| 1972 | Spartakiada Dolnośląska (Junior Lower Silesian Spartakiad) | Wrocław | 87+ kg | 2nd |
| 1973 | Turniej nadziei olimpiskich "Moskwa 80" (1980 Moscow Olympics ID Tournament) | Olsztyn | 87+ kg | 3rd |
| 1973 | Turniej o "Złoty Pas" ("Golden Belt" Tournament) | Jelenia Góra | 87+ kg | 1st |
| 1974 | Turniej o "Złoty Pas" ("Golden Belt" Tournament) | Jelenia Góra | 87+ kg | 1st |
| 1974 | Mistrzostwa Dolnego Śląska Juniorów (Lower Silesian Junior Championship) | Jelenia Góra | 100+ kg | 1st |
| 1975 | II Ogolnopolski Festiwal Dozynkowy LZS (National LZS Tournament) | Koszalin | 100 kg | 1st |
| 1975 | Mistrzostwa Polski Juniorow (Polish Junior Championship) | Elbląg | 100–130 kg | 3rd |
| 1976 | Turniej p.n. "Szukamy Olimpijczykow" (Olympic ID Tournament) | Radom | 100+ kg | 1st |
| 1976 | Mistrzostwa W.F.S. (W.F.S. Tournament) | Jelenia Góra | 100+ kg | 1st |
| 1976 | Mistrzostwa Polski Juniorow (Polish Junior Championship) | Warsaw | 100+ kg | 4th |
| 1977 | Spartakiada Dolnośląska (Senior Lower Silesian Spartakiad) | Jelenia Góra | 100+ kg | 1st |
| 1977 | Mistrzostwa II Ligi Indywidualnej (II Division Championship) | Bielawa | 100+ kg | 1st |
| 1991 | New Zealand Championship | Christchurch | 100–130 kg | 1st |
| 1991 | IV Commonwealth Wrestling Championship | Dunedin | 100–130 kg | 3rd |
| 1992 | National Tauranga Highland Games | Tauranga | 100–130 kg | 1st |
