= Cris and Cru Kahui homicides =

2006 New Zealand murders of twin infants

The Cris and Cru Kahui homicides refers to the murders of twin brothers Christopher Arepa and Cru Omeka Kahui (20 March 2006 – 18 June 2006), two New Zealand infants who died in Auckland's Starship Children's Hospital after being admitted with serious head injuries. Their family initially refused to cooperate with police in the homicide investigation into the children's murder. The father, then 21-year-old Chris Kahui, was charged with their murder. Kahui's defence was that the mother, Macsyna King, was responsible for the deaths. After a six-week trial, the jury took just one minute to acquit Kahui. In July 2012, a coroner's report was released, which concluded that the children's injuries occurred "whilst they were in the sole custody, care and control of their father".

== Background ==
Chris and Cru Kahui were the two survivors of triplets born prematurely at 29 weeks by emergency caesarean section on 20 March 2006 at the National Women's Hospital in Grafton to parents Christopher Sonny Kahui and Macsyna Pono King. At the time of their birth, King was 29 and her partner Kahui was 21, and they were already the parents of a 13-month-old son, Shane, who was born in 2005. Prior to that, King, who was born in South Auckland, had already had three other children in two previous relationships, and met Kahui through his father when she was 27 and he 19. However, the relationship was not always smooth, with a range of risk factors contributing to tension and instability for the couple prior to, and after, the arrival of their children.

After their birth, Cris and Cru spent six weeks at the Kidz First neonatal intensive care unit at Middlemore Hospital. During this time, nurses and social workers at the facility had informally raised concerns with a worker from the New Zealand Department of Child, Youth and Family Services (CYF), as the parents did not spend a lot of time with the twins. According to the hospital, parents not visiting is not considered child abuse, but was a "cause for concern". Because the infants were still technically patients of Middlemore Hospital, hospital workers regularly visited the family home. During their last visit to the hospital, Chris and Cru were reported to be healthy and well-fed. However, an autopsy showed that the infants had suffered fractured ribs in an incident prior to the fatal injuries.

== Deaths ==
On 13 June 2006, upon returning home after a night of partying, King found that the twins suffered extensive bruises and that their grandfather, William "Banjo" Kahui, had performed cardiopulmonary resuscitation on them. Police said Banjo was not the only person in the house at the time. According to former MP John Tamihere, members of Chris Kahui's extended family had said "a young relative", whom they refused to name, was caring for the infants on the day they were fatally injured. King and Kahui took their children to the family's general practitioner, who ordered immediate hospitalisation for the infants. The coroner made a finding that Kahui refused to take the children to hospital, running away from the family car and leaving a distraught King carrying the twins in their carriers into the hospital on her own.

Doctors immediately discovered that the infants had serious brain injuries. Both had suffered skull fractures from blunt force trauma, and Cris had a broken femur. An orthopaedic specialist told The Sunday Star-Times that in order to break the femur of a baby, the bone would have to be deliberately bent at a 90-degree angle, ruling out an accidental cause of the injury. After the infants were transferred to Starship Children's Hospital, hospital staff notified the police. CYF removed Shane and their female cousin Cayenne, aged six months, from two rented Housing New Zealand homes – one in Clendon and the other in Māngere — where Cris and Cru had lived. Police said they were treated in hospital for injuries resulting from "neglect", showing signs of malnourishment and poor hygiene. According to the Herald on Sunday newspaper, the two children were to be returned to the family in September 2006, but neither the parents nor members of Kahui's family who persistently refused to cooperate with police would be their caregivers.

Cris and Cru were ultimately taken off life support, with Cru being the first to die at 5 a.m. on 18 June. Cris died at 6:45 p.m. later in the day. The bodies were released to the family on 21 June, taken to the Manurewa marae for a tangihanga (funeral rites), and were buried at the Manukau City cemetery on 24 June.

== Investigation ==
The deaths of Cris and Cru resulted in an initial serious assault investigation by the New Zealand Police before charges were upgraded to homicide. The police believe that, while the infants were in hospital prior to their deaths, the Kahui family was uncooperative with any investigation. Pita Sharples, the co-leader of the Māori Party, said the family had agreed to talk to police on 26 June, but this did not happen. Following the deaths, Sharples said he was disgusted by the Kahui family's behaviour, claiming some of them were more interested in going "to the pub and have a drink" than coming forward to police. Prime Minister Helen Clark said it was "absolutely shocking" for the family to hide behind the funeral while everyone in the country was "shocked and revolted" by the children's injuries. There were even reports that gang members were threatening the family in utu (or revenge) over their refusal to speak.

After refusing to speak to police in the week after the death, police finally went to residences of the Kahui family on 27 June. At least four family members, including King and an aunt, were escorted to police stations. By 4 July, at least twenty extended family members were questioned, as well as ninety medical practitioners and staff who were in contact with the twins. Forensic scientists removed items such as clothing from the Kahui residences. By September, police said that the family were no longer "stone-walling" their inquiries, but a prima facie case had yet to be established. Sunday News reported on 17 September that a list of suspects was down to three and an arrest was imminent. This was followed by a police statement nine days later stating that they now knew who was responsible for the deaths. However, other family members could still be charged with related crimes.

Two half-sisters of King appeared on TVNZ's Sunday 23 July episode, claiming that King and her brother, Robert King, had told them the name of the killer. TVNZ censored the name when one of the women said it, but the gender was revealed to be male. The infants' paternal grandmother, who appeared the next day on TV3's Campbell Live, contradicted this information, stating that the killer was female.

The homes where Cris and Cru lived were also home to at least nine adult occupants, eight of whom were on some form of social welfare. These relatives had been receiving payments totalling between $845 and $1395 a week, depending on their age and circumstances. Work and Income New Zealand launched an investigation to see whether all the payments were legitimate. Two instances of substantiated benefit fraud were found for one individual. The Clendon house had been occupied for two to three months, but neighbours had not noticed that infants were living there. According to the neighbours, Tuesday and Thursday nights were "party nights," as this was when benefit payments were received. Loud music, foul language and fighting were frequently heard. One neighbour said that a sixteen-year-old female appeared on their doorstep at 3:30 a.m. one morning after she said an older man at the Clendon house attempted to sexually assault her.

=== Murder arrest ===
The 1 October edition of the Star-Times published an interview with Kahui, who said that he did not kill his sons, but if police could not find anyone else, "I go down for something I didn't do". Investigators called Kahui's interview with the police on 3 October a "major development". On 26 October, a "carload of detectives" had gone to several addresses looking for Kahui, who was brought in for questioning. At 10 p.m., it was announced in a press conference that a 21-year-old man had been arrested and charged with the murder of the infants, and would appear in the Manukau District Court the next day. No other family members faced charges with relation to the deaths.

Contrary to this, the Sunday News reported on 31 December that, according to an unnamed source, a second arrest was expected. Neither the exact charges that would be laid nor the relationship of the person to the infants were revealed. Three weeks later the Sunday News said four people involved in the investigation had been summoned to appear at the Manukau District Court on 24 January. Sources told the newspaper that the new charges relate to dead infants and a pre-school child. One of those to be charged was King, the mother of Chris and Cru. None of these charges eventuated. According to the Herald on Sunday, a Microsoft Word file containing the press release announcing the arrest of Kahui had actually been created five days earlier, and the last edit was the day before the arrest. In the same article, the Herald reported police were questioning whether Kahui was actually the biological father of the infants. DNA tests later confirmed that he was the father.

=== Court appearances ===
Kahui appeared in the Number One court of the Manukau District Court on 27 October for a two-minute hearing, where he was formally charged with murder. He was asked not to plead; however, outside the court, Kahui's lawyer, Lorraine Smith, said her client would "fight the charges". Kahui was remanded in police custody until 10 November, when he was freed on bail. A pre-depositions hearing was held 17 January. A second pre-depositions hearing was intended to take place on 21 March. This was so Kahui's lawyer could read sixty files of evidence collected by police, and for a medical expert from Australia to become available. This second hearing was delayed because the defence was still waiting for the medical report from Australia. The depositions hearing was finally set for 18 June, with a brief court appearance on 18 April. This date was later changed to sometime on 13 August.

Kahui was found not guilty on Thursday 22 May 2008, after only one minute of deliberation by the jury. The officer who led the police investigations into the murders, Detective Inspector John Tims, said he was "disappointed" at the verdict, finding "no evidence to support a charge against any other person and that includes the mother, Macsyna King". Tims acknowledged the prosecutor, who had "said in his opening and closing address that there is no new evidence to support a charge being laid against the mother, Macsyna King". No charges were laid against King. Kahui's lawyer has threatened to lodge a complaint with the Police Complaints Authority over police handling of the prosecution of her client for the murder of the twins.

=== Coroner's report ===
Coroner Gary Evans released a report into the deaths of the children in July 2012. He found that the twins had suffered the brain injuries which led to their deaths during the afternoon or early evening of 12 June 2006, at a time "whilst they were in the sole custody, care and control of their father", Kahui. He said there was no evidence or fact to support that injuries being caused by King. Kahui, who gave evidence to the coroner's inquest, attempted to prevent the publication of the report.

== Significance ==
The case highlighted the fact that Māori children are more than twice as likely to die as a result of abuse than non-Māori and that New Zealand ranks fifth highest among OECD nations for child deaths due to maltreatment according to a 2003 UNICEF report.

== Media ==
The case was covered by Casefile True Crime Podcast on 23 April 2016.

== See also ==
- List of unsolved murders (2000–present)
