= Owen Truelove =

British aviator (1937-2006)

Owen James Truelove (24 October 1937 – 14 November 2006) was the first man to fly from the United Kingdom to New Zealand with a motor glider. He died in a gliding accident in New Zealand in November 2006.

Truelove had served in the RAF (reaching the Rank of Air Commodore), as an Aeronautical and Weapons Engineer, on the Vulcan and Hunter. His service took him to Aden, United States and Cyprus as well as London and Lincolnshire. He retired from the RAF as Director of Aircraft Engineering in 1989 after 33 years service. Following his retirement from the RAF he worked as a consultant in the Defence and Logistics Industry.
