= New Zealand Open Rescue =

New Zealand Open Rescue logo

New Zealand Open Rescue is an animal rights advocacy organisation, formed in 2006, by a collective of animal rights activists from across New Zealand. The organisation uses non-violent direct action and civil disobedience to promote awareness and create change on the issue of factory farming, most notably of pigs and egg laying hens.

Tactics undertaken include rescuing animals from factory farms, conducting investigations inside factory farms, carrying out peaceful protests, documentary making and various public outreach activities. The activists involved follow the international model of Open rescue by openly identifying themselves and accepting any legal repercussions which may arise as a result of their actions for factory farmed animals.

== First rescue of battery hens ==
New Zealand Open Rescue's first action was the rescue of 20 battery hens from Turks Poultry Farm in Foxton, New Zealand in 2006. Activist Mark Eden, spokesperson for the rescue, was arrested and charged with burglary for his part in the action. Eden argued in a jury trial that he had acted to challenge the legal property status of animals and that his intent was not to steal property but to mitigate suffering.

Owner of the farm, Johannes Turk, was critical of Eden and his fellow activists during the court case saying "You're being charged here, not me. To you people, you shouldn't eat eggs, you shouldn't eat meat. You're anti-everything". Eden was found guilty and sentenced to 150 hours community service. The action received national media coverage and brought the practice of farming hens in cages under public scrutiny.

== Intensive pig farming campaign ==
=== Mother's Day rescue of piglets ===
New Zealand Open Rescue began their campaign against intensive pig farming with a rescue of two piglets from an intensive farm on Mother's Day in 2008. The aim of the action was to highlight the plight of mother pigs (sows) confined to sow stalls and farrowing crates. Spokesperson Deirdre Sims said, "We witnessed sows in farrowing crates anguished in extreme confinement. These mother pigs were unable to walk or turn around, let alone able to interact with their babies. We rescued two female piglets from this horror, placing them into a wonderful new home. We did this so that these young females will never have to endure the suffering and deprivation that their mothers experience".

The organisation made a short film of the rescue. The Pork Industry Board responded to the action by laughing off claims of animal cruelty. Pork industry spokesperson Chris Trengrove told national media that the activists were hyping up claims of cruelty to get attention.

=== Mike King pig farm expose ===
In 2009 Mike King, New Zealand comedian and former front-man of the New Zealand pork industry, contacted New Zealand Open Rescue after watching the group's short film. Despite fronting the New Zealand pork industry for seven years in a series of high-profile television commercials, King had never been to a pig farm. King requested to be taken inside a typical pig farm and went with the group to Kuku Beach Piggery in Levin.

The piggery is owned by former New Zealand Pork Board member Colin Kay. Following this visit, New Zealand Open Rescue worked in conjunction with King and New Zealand's largest animal rights organisation SAFE (Save Animals From Exploitation) to expose both the Kuku Beach Piggery and the wider New Zealand pork industry. Current affairs television programme Sunday launched the expose. The Pork Board responded by defending the use of sow stalls. Pork Board Chief Executive Sam McIvor said any other methods of farming pigs would be inhumane and that banning sow stalls would be pointless.

=== Civil disobedience at pig farm ===
In 2010 New Zealand Open Rescue activist John Darroch chained himself to a 6-m tall silo on an intensive piggery in Roto-O-Rangi, part of the Waikato region. Darroch stated his action was not aimed at the particular farm he had chained himself to, but rather at an industry that is "inherently cruel, and a government which refuses to act". Darroch was prepared to occupy the farm for up to two days and nights but was cut down by police with an angle grinder about 9pm on the first day.

The action followed a televised expose of the organisation's investigations into pig farms across the country. Darroch was charged with trespass and unlawfully being in a building. The court case is ongoing. The owner of the farm and the Pork Industry Board made no comment in response to the protest but later issued Darroch and other New Zealand Open Rescue activists with trespass notices for the Roto-O-Rangi piggery.

== See also ==
- Animal welfare in New Zealand
