= Bruce Morrison (cricketer) =

New Zealand cricketer (1933–2025)

Personal information
- Full name: Bruce Donald Morrison
- Born: 17 December 1933; Lower Hutt, New Zealand
- Died: 23 September 2025 (aged 91); Lower Hutt, New Zealand
- Batting: Left-handed
- Bowling: Right-arm medium

International information
- National side: New Zealand (1963)
- Only Test (cap 96): 1 March 1963 v England

Domestic team information
- Years: Team
- 1953/54–1964/65: Wellington

Career statistics
Competition	Test	First-class
Matches	1	47
Runs scored	10	374
Batting average	5.00	9.34
100s/50s	0/0	0/0
Top score	10	37
Balls bowled	186	11,110
Wickets	2	167
Bowling average	64.50	24.16
5 wickets in innings	0	7
10 wickets in match	0	2
Best bowling	2/129	7/42
Catches/stumpings	1/–	30/–
- Source: Cricinfo, 1 April 2017

Bruce Donald Morrison (17 December 1933 – 23 September 2025) was a New Zealand cricketer who played one Test match in 1963. He bowled right-arm medium pace and was a left-handed tail-end batsman.

== Biography ==
Born in Lower Hutt, Morrison first appeared for his local side, Hutt Valley, in an away game at Nelson in the Hawke Cup in December 1951. Aged 20, he made his first class debut for Wellington against Otago at the Basin Reserve on 7 January 1954. He made an immediate impact, taking 4–70 in Otago's first innings and then 7–42 in their second (although Otago won a thriller by 3 runs). In his next game he continued his fine form, taking 5–60 against Auckland at Eden Park and scoring 33 not out with the bat. He finished the season with 22 wickets at an average of only 16.68.

The highlight of Morrison's next season was Wellington's tour match against the MCC, when he picked up the wickets of Trevor Bailey, Bill Edrich and Colin Cowdrey at the Basin Reserve. He finished the season with 16 wickets at nearly 30 apiece. In 1955–56 he had a better season, with 7–68 against Central Districts being the stand-out performance, and a final haul of 24 wickets for the season. While the 1956–57 season was good (15 wickets at 20.93 apiece) it wasn't until 1960–61 (11 wickets at 17.81), 1961–62 (16 wickets at 18.93) and especially 1962–63 (27 wickets at 20.55, including 5–41 against Otago at Carisbrook, Dunedin that he recaptured his early-career form.

Morrison's wicket-taking in the Plunket Shield in 1962–63 led to selection for his only Test later that season, the 96th person capped by New Zealand, in the Second Test against England at the Basin Reserve starting on 1 March 1963. England only batted once, winning by an innings, and Morrison was expensive, with his two wickets (Ted Dexter and Peter Parfitt, both in the same over) coming at a cost of 129 runs. He was not selected for the Third Test.

Morrison played two more first-class seasons for Wellington. His final match was against the touring Pakistanis in January 1965. He continued to play for Hutt Valley in the Hawke Cup until the 1967–68 season.

In 1997–98 Morrison was the joint first winner of the Bert Sutcliffe Medal, which recognises outstanding services to cricket in New Zealand, in recognition of his work for junior cricket in the Wellington area. He was also a Wellington selector for some years. He ran a sports goods business in Hutt Valley before retiring to live in Trentham.

Morrison died in Hutt Hospital, Lower Hutt, on 23 September 2025, at the age of 91.
