= Leslie Butler (cricketer) =

New Zealand cricketer (1934–2006)

Personal information
- Full name: Leslie Charles Butler
- Born: 2 September 1934; Wellington, New Zealand
- Died: 21 January 2006 (aged 71); Clear Island Waters, Queensland, Australia
- Batting: Left-handed
- Bowling: Slow left-arm orthodox
- Role: All-rounder

Domestic team information
- Years: Team
- 1951/52–1967/68: Wellington
- FC debut: 1 February 1952 Wellington v Auckland
- Last FC: 1 January 1968 Wellington v Canterbury

Career statistics
Competition	First-class
Matches	53
Runs scored	1,396
Batting average	19.12
100s/50s	1/6
Top score	101*
Balls bowled	9,291
Wickets	120
Bowling average	24.28
5 wickets in innings	2
10 wickets in match	1
Best bowling	8/50
Catches/stumpings	47/–
- Source: CricketArchive, 12 September 2009

Leslie Charles Butler (2 September 1934 – 21 January 2006) was a New Zealand cricketer. A left-handed batsman and slow left-arm spin bowler, Butler played as an all-rounder for Wellington between 1951 and 1967, scoring 1,396 runs and taking 120 wickets from 53 first class cricket matches. He was also selected for two first-class matches against the Marylebone Cricket Club as part of the New Zealand hosting team in 1961.

== Career ==
Butler was born in September 1934, in Wellington, New Zealand. He played his first match for Wellington on 1 February 1953, against Auckland at Eden Park as part of the Plunket Shield. Batting at number 11, he scored 10*, then bowled 11 wicket-less overs for 47. He was not out for zero in the second innings, and did not bowl again, nor play for the remainder of the 1951/52 season. He scored 53 runs from four matches in the next season at the low averaged of 8.83, and took three wickets at a struggling 44.33. He did not play again until 1957, where he appeared five times, scoring 61 runs at 7.62 and taking six wickets at an improved 27.33.

His bowling improved greatly in 1958/59, taking 21 wickets at 22.76, including a best of 4/42. His batting, however, saw 214 runs at only 16.46 from his seven appearances, despite a career best 35. It was not until the 1959/60 series where he enjoyed successful returns with the bat – 190 runs from his five matches came largely from a score of 66*, one of two half centuries during the season. His average, though inflated by four not outs to 63.33, was the third highest in New Zealand for that season. He also took six wickets at 35.83. He scored 159 runs in the following season, including a third half-century of 51, and took 15 wickets at a then career-best 19.93. During this season he was selected to represent New Zealand against the Marylebone Cricket Club during their tour of New Zealand. In his two matches, in February and March 1961, he scored 23 runs at 7.66, and took two wickets at 11.00.

The 1961/62 season saw eight wickets at 20.50, composed largely of Butler's first five-wicket-haul, 5/34. He also scored his first and only century, 101*, which formed nearly half of his season total of 221 runs at 36.83. Butler then only made one appearance in the 1962/63 season, failing to take a wicket and scoring six runs. Four more appearances during the 1963/64 season brought only 85 runs, mostly from one innings of 52, and five wickets at 29.40. In the following season, he scored only 106 runs at 11.77, but took 16 wickets at 27.81. This was followed by a career-best 31 wickets at 16.48 in the 1965/66 season, including a career-best 8/50 against New Zealand Under-23s, supported by 115 runs at 23.00. 1967/68 was his final season, however, with three appearances yielding 176 runs at 35.20, including two half-centuries, and nine wickets at 30.33. In his final match, on 1 January 1968 against Canterbury, he enjoyed one of his most successful returns. He took five wickets, four in the first innings for 60 runs, and one in the second for 68. He then scored 65 runs batting at number nine, and 56 in the second innings batting at number three. His efforts with the bat and the ball in this final match were his season best.
