= Ron Murray (cricketer) =

New Zealand cricketer (1927–1951)

Personal information
- Full name: Ronald McKenzie Murray
- Born: 15 June 1927; Wellington, New Zealand
- Died: 8 April 1951 (aged 23); Christchurch, New Zealand
- Batting: Right-handed
- Bowling: Right-arm medium-pace
- Role: All-rounder

Domestic team information
- Years: Team
- 1946–47 to 1950–51: Wellington

Career statistics
| Competition | First-class |
|---|---|
| Matches | 17 |
| Runs scored | 399 |
| Batting average | 17.34 |
| 100s/50s | 0/1 |
| Top score | 52* |
| Balls bowled | 3364 |
| Wickets | 59 |
| Bowling average | 23.93 |
| 5 wickets in innings | 1 |
| 10 wickets in match | 0 |
| Best bowling | 5/85 |
| Catches/stumpings | 10/– |
- Source: Cricinfo, 24 May 2018

Ronald McKenzie Murray (15 June 1927 – 8 April 1951) was a New Zealand cricketer who played first-class cricket for Wellington from 1947 to 1951.

== Life and career ==
Murray was born in Wellington and educated at Wellington College. He was a right-arm medium-pace bowler who specialised in out-swing, and a useful lower-order batsman who was "at his best in a crisis". He first played for Wellington in February 1947 at the age of 19, and the following month he opened the bowling and took 3 for 43 and 5 for 85 for Wellington against the touring MCC. His victims in the second innings were Laurie Fishlock, Bill Edrich, Denis Compton, Wally Hammond and Godfrey Evans.

He was the second-most successful bowler in the Plunket Shield in 1947–48, taking 13 wickets at an average of 28.00. He was less successful in 1948–49, and although he took part in the trial matches, he failed to win a place in the New Zealand team for England in 1949.

Murray returned to form in 1949–50 and was again the second-most successful bowler in the Plunket Shield, taking 13 wickets at an average of 14.61, and helping Wellington win the championship for the first time since 1935–36. In the first match he took a hat-trick to reduce Otago's first innings from 116 for 2 to 116 for 5; Wellington won by seven wickets. In a senior club match in Wellington in 1949 he scored 103 and took 9 for 27 in a single afternoon.

Murray was a journalist for the Evening Post in Wellington. He was considered a likely Test player, but he died aged 23 on 8 April 1951 from head injuries he received when he fell while visiting a sick friend at Hanmer Springs in Canterbury. At the inquest, the coroner concluded that Murray had fallen through a gap in a partially-completed fire escape after dark and sustained a fractured skull when he landed on the concrete below.

Beginning with the 1951–52 season the Ron Murray Cup has been awarded annually to the leading wicket-taker in Wellington senior club cricket.
