= Herb Pearson =

New Zealand cricketer (1910–2006)

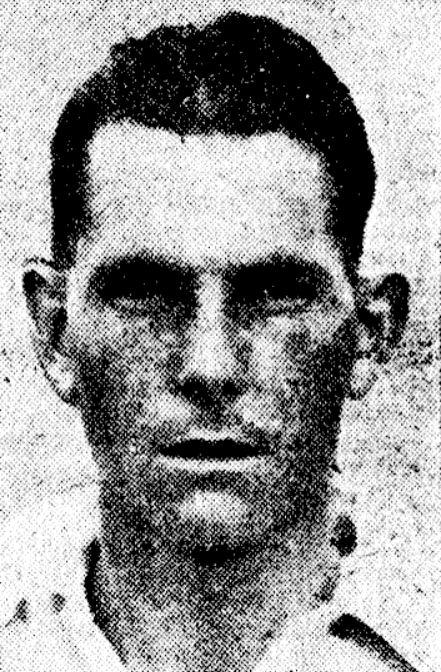

Personal information
- Full name: Herbert Taylor Pearson
- Born: 5 August 1910; Palmerston North, Manawatu, New Zealand
- Died: 15 June 2006 (aged 95); Auckland, New Zealand
- Batting: Right-handed
- Bowling: Right-arm
- Role: Batsman

Domestic team information
- Years: Team
- 1932/33–1947/48: Auckland

Career statistics
Competition	First-class
Matches	30
Runs scored	1,392
Batting average	30.26
100s/50s	2/7
Top score	172
Balls bowled	12
Wickets	0
Bowling average	–
5 wickets in innings	–
10 wickets in match	–
Best bowling	–
Catches/stumpings	18/–
- Source: Cricinfo, 27 December 2023

Herbert Taylor Pearson (5 August 1910 – 15 June 2006) was a New Zealand cricketer who played for Auckland in the 1930s and 1940s.

Pearson attended King's College, Auckland. He was an opening batsman. He captained Auckland in his last season of first-class cricket, 1947–48, when he made his highest score of 172 in 470 minutes in the Plunket Shield against Canterbury.

Pearson also played rugby as a full-back for Auckland. He served in the Royal New Zealand Navy during World War II. Later he was a selector for the Auckland cricket team.
