= South Island cricket team =

New Zealand cricket team

The South Island cricket team is a representative cricket team in New Zealand made up of players from the South Island. They have played intermittently in first-class matches since 1902–03 and in List A matches since 1981–82.

== First-class matches ==
South Island have most frequently played against the North Island cricket team, but have also played against touring national sides. Their first first-class match was against the touring English team in February 1903, when the English team won by an innings.

The first-class matches between South Island and North Island have often been used to help the national selectors choose teams for forthcoming tours or Test series. South Island won the first match between the two teams in 1903–04, by two wickets. North Island won the most recent first-class match in 1999–2000, part of the Shell Conference tournament, by 32 runs.

In total, the two teams have played each other 12 times in first-class matches. South Island have won four times, North Island six times, and two matches have ended in draws. The highest score for South Island is 167 by Graham Dowling in 1968–69, and the best innings and match bowling figures are 7 for 117 and 12 for 152 by Paul Wiseman in 1999–2000.

== List A matches ==
In the 1981–82, 1993–94 and 1994–95 seasons, South Island played North Island in one-day matches billed as the "Plunket Shield", while similar contests in 2003–04 and 2004–05 were named the "State of Origin" matches. In their five List A matches, South Island have won once, and North Island four times.
