= New Zealand cricket team in India in 1955–56 =

International cricket tour

- Date: 15 November 1955 – 12 January 1956
- Location: India
- Result: India won the 5-Test series 2–0
Teams
- India: New Zealand
Captains
- Ghulam Ahmed: Harry Cave
Most runs
- Vinoo Mankad (526) Vijay Manjrekar (386) Polly Umrigar (351): Bert Sutcliffe (611); John Reid (493); John Guy (313)
Most wickets
- Subhash Gupte (34) Vinoo Mankad (12) Dattu Phadkar (6): Johnny Hayes (10); Harry Cave (7); Tony MacGibbon (7)

The New Zealand national cricket team toured India in 1955–56 season. The teams played five Tests. India won the series 2–0 with three Tests drawn. Before the series, the New Zealand team had played a three-Test series in Pakistan, losing that series 0–2.

== Squads ==
India	New Zealand
Ghulam Ahmed (c); Vinoo Mankad; Vijay Manjrekar; Polly Umrigar; Dattu Phadkar; Subhash Gupte; Jayasinghrao Ghorpade; Gulabrai Ramchand; Chandrakant Patankar; Bapu Nadkarni; Pankaj Roy; Gundibail Sunderam; Vijay Mehra; Nari Contractor; Sadashiv Patil; A. G. Kripal Singh; Narain Swamy	Harry Cave (c); John Reid (vc); Jack Alabaster; John Guy; Noel Harford; Zin Harris; Johnny Hayes; Gordon Leggat; Tony MacGibbon; Noel McGregor; Trevor McMahon; Alex Moir; Eric Petrie; Matt Poore; Bert Sutcliffe

Every player played at least one Test in the series. Cave, Reid, Guy, Hayes, MacGibbon and Sutcliffe played all five Tests. The team was managed by Henry Cooper, who was at the time headmaster of Auckland Grammar School, and had previously played three first-class matches for Auckland.

== Tour matches ==
=== Three-day: West Zone v New Zealanders ===
15–17 November 1956
Scorecard

New Zealanders	v	West Zone
162 (57.3 overs); Alex Moir 36; Baloo Gupte 4/63 (24 overs)		179 (75.2 overs); Nari Contractor 46; Tony MacGibbon 4/32 (24 overs)
269 (96.4 overs); Alex Moir 55; Sadashiv Patil 4/30 (16.4 overs)		254/4 (50 overs); Vinoo Mankad 103; Tony MacGibbon 1/92 (22 overs)

West Zone won by 6 wickets
Club of Maharashtra, Poona
Umpires: T. B. Dani and S. N. Kothawalla

- New Zealanders won the toss and elected to bat.

Electing to bat upon winning the toss, the New Zealanders made 162 on a grassy wicket. Harry Cave and Alex Moir offered any resistance to West Zone's bowling. In reply, West Zone lost three early wickets Nari Contractor and Bapu Nadkarni struck a 62-run partnership taking their team to 100/4 at close of play. The West Zone batsmen failed to keep up with the pace of Johnny Hayes and Tony MacGibbon, and were dismissed for 179 the following afternoon. The New Zealanders began their second innings scoring at brisk pace making 215 runs in 208 minutes. Starting the final day at 215/6, the New Zealanders lost their tail the final morning, setting West Zone a target of 252 runs to be made in 225 minutes. Captain Vinoo Mankad opening in West Zone's second innings made a fighting 103 in 210 minutes while striking partnerships with Madhav Apte and Nari Contractor that yielded 105 and 116 runs respectively. West Zone reached the target with three minutes to spare and six wickets in hand.

=== Three-day: South Zone v New Zealanders ===
26–28 November 1955
Scorecard

South Zone	v	New Zealanders
134 (40.4 overs); Dinesh Medh 30; John Reid 4/56 (12.4 overs)		459/6d (105 overs); Bert Sutcliffe 106; Mohan Rai 2/74 (16 overs)
322 (128 overs); C. D. Gopinath 175; Jack Alabaster 5/99 (34 overs)

New Zealanders won by and innings and 3 runs
Central College Ground, Bangalore
Umpires: M. Anantaswamy Rao and S. K. Raghunatha Rao

- South Zone won the toss and elected to bat.
- John Reid (New Zealanders) passed 6,000 runs in first-class cricket.

== Test matches ==
=== 1st Test ===
19–24 November 1955
Scorecard

India	v	New Zealand
498/4d (175.1 overs); Polly Umrigar 223; Johnny Hayes 3/91 (26 overs)		326 (209.4 overs); John Guy 102; Subhash Gupte 7/128 (76.4 overs)
		212/2 (92 overs); Bert Sutcliffe 137; Subhash Gupte 1/28 (18 overs)

Match drawn
Fateh Maidan, Hyderabad
Umpires: Jamshed Patel and Mysore Vijayasarathi

- India won the toss and elected to bat.
- A. G. Kripal Singh and Narain Swamy (both Ind) made their Test debuts.
- A. G. Kripal Singh became the third India player to score a century on debut. John Guy also scored his first Test century.
- Polly Umrigar's 223 was the highest individual score by an India player in Tests, before it was equalled in the next and surpassed in the final Test by Vinoo Mankad.
- Polly Umrigar and Vinoo Mankad's partnership of 238 runs was India's highest for the third wicket, before it was surpassed by Gundappa Viswanath and Yashpal Sharma (316) in 1982.
- India's total of 498 in the first innings was their highest in a Test innings before it was surpassed in the Third Test.
- 21 November was a rest day.

=== 2nd Test ===
2–7 December 1955
Scorecard

India	v	New Zealand
421/8d (158 overs); Vinoo Mankad 223; Harry Cave 3/77 (48 overs)		258 (134.1 overs); Bert Sutcliffe 73; Subhash Gupte 3/83 (51 overs)
		136 (77.4 overs); Bert Sutcliffe 37; Subhash Gupte 5/45 (32.4 overs)

India won by an innings and 27 runs
Brabourne Stadium, Bombay
Umpires: Balkrishna Mohoni and Mysore Vijayasarathi

- India won the toss and elected to bat.
- Vijay Mehra, Nari Contractor and Sadashiv Patil (Ind) made their Test debuts.
- 5 December was a rest day.

=== 3rd Test ===
16–21 December 1955
Scorecard

New Zealand	v	India
450/2d (176 overs); Bert Sutcliffe 230; Subhash Gupte 1/98 (39 overs)		531/7d (241.5 overs); Vijay Manjrekar 177; Johnny Hayes 2/105 (44 overs)
112/1 (58 overs); Gordon Leggat 50; Vijay Manjrekar 1/16 (20 overs)

Match drawn
Feroz Shah Kotla, Delhi
Umpires: Dinkar Desai (Ind) and Noshirvan Nagarwala (Ind)

- New Zealand won the toss and elected to bat.
- Bapu Nadkarni and Gundibail Sunderam (Ind) made their Test debuts.
- John Reid (NZ) and Vijay Manjrekar (Ind) both passed 1,000 runs in Tests.
- Bert Sutcliffe scored the highest individual score by a New Zealand player in a Test innings (230), before it was surpassed by Graham Dowling in 1968.
- 19 December was a rest day.

=== 4th Test ===
28 December–2 January 1956
Scorecard

India	v	New Zealand
132 (59.3 overs); Jayasinghrao Ghorpade 39; John Reid 3/19 (16 overs)		336 (145.5 overs); John Reid 120; Subhash Gupte 6/90 (33.5 overs)
438/7d (209 overs); Gulabrai Ramchand 106; Johnny Hayes 2/67 (30 overs)		75/6 (34 overs); Noel McGregor 29; Dattu Phadkar 2/11 (4 overs)

Match drawn
Eden Gardens, Calcutta
Umpires: Dinkar Desai (Ind) and Santosh Ganguli (Ind)

- India won the toss and elected to bat.
- Chandrakant Patankar (Ind) made his Test debut.
- 30 December was a rest day.
- Gulabrai Ramchand (Ind) scored his first century in Tests.

=== 5th Test ===
6–11 January 1956
Scorecard

India	v	New Zealand
537/3d (177 overs); Vinoo Mankad 231; Matt Poore 1/95 (31 overs)		209 (132 overs); Bert Sutcliffe 47; Subhash Gupte 5/72 (49 overs)
		219 (130.3 overs); John Reid 63; Vinoo Mankad 4/65 (40 overs)

India won by an innings and 109 runs
Nehru Stadium, Madras
Umpires: Bapu Joshi (Ind) and Mysore Vijayasarathi (Ind)

- India won the toss and elected to bat.
- Vinoo Mankad (Ind) and Bert Sutcliffe (NZ) both passed 2,000 runs in Tests.
- Vinoo Mankad and Pankaj Roy (Ind) broke the record for highest partnership for the first wicket in Tests (413), before it was surpassed by Neil McKenzie and Graeme Smith in 2008. It was also the highest first wicket partnership in India's first-class cricket till 1977.
- Vinoo Mankad's 231 was the highest individual score for India in Tests before it was surpassed by Sunil Gavaskar (236) in 1983.
- 9 January was a rest day.
