= England cricket team Test results (1946–1959) =

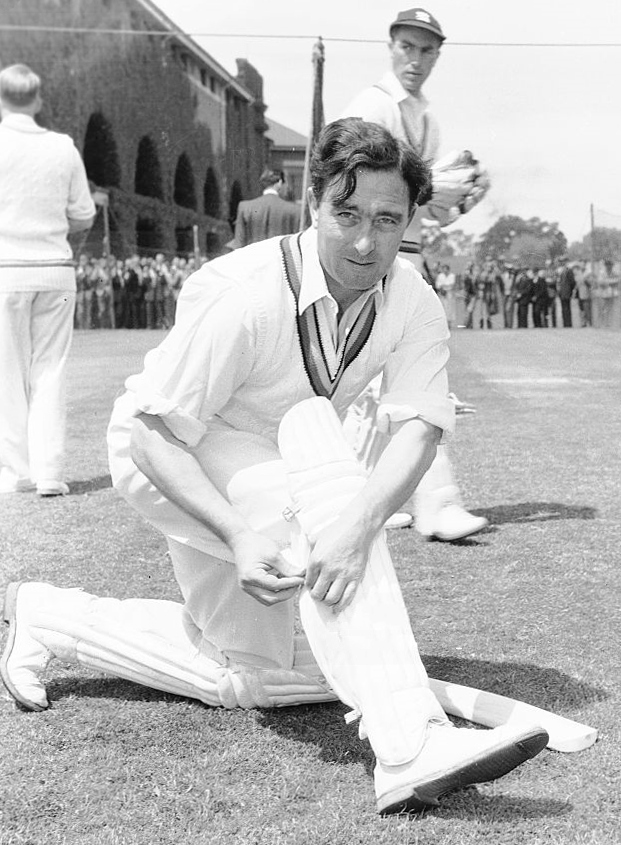
Denis Compton was one of England's top batsmen between 1940 and 1959, scoring over 5,000 runs.

International cricket, which had been suspended since 1939 due to the Second World War, resumed in 1946. From then until the end of 1959, the England cricket team, which represented England, Scotland and Wales in Test cricket, (Note: The England cricket team represented Scotland until 1992, when they left the UK Cricket Council, and later joined the International Cricket Council (ICC) as an independent member.) played 115 Test matches, resulting in 45 victories, 39 draws and 31 defeats. During this period, England faced Pakistan for the first time, when they toured England in 1954. During that tour, they became the first team to win a Test match on their first visit to England. England were the dominant team in international cricket during the 1950s; they did not lose a Test series between March 1951 and December 1958, and featured an array of stars such as Colin Cowdrey, Denis Compton, Fred Trueman, Brian Statham and Jim Laker.

England faced Australia most frequently during this period—playing 35 matches against them—followed by South Africa. England won more matches than they lost against India, New Zealand and South Africa, but against Australia they won seven and lost seventeen Ashes matches, while against the West Indies they won six and lost seven. They faced newcomers Pakistan in just four matches, winning one, losing one and drawing the others. England won 16 matches by an innings, with their largest victory being by an innings and 248 runs against New Zealand in 1958. Their largest victory by runs alone during this period was in 1956–57 against South Africa, when they won by 312 runs, while they won by ten wickets on four occasions. Conversely, England suffered their largest ever defeat, losing to Australia by an innings and 332 runs during the 1946–47 Ashes series.

== Key ==
Key
Symbol	Meaning
No. (Eng.)	Match number for England (i.e. 300 was England's 300th Test match)
No. (Ove.)	Match number overall (i.e. 300 was the 300th Test match)
Opposition	The team England was playing against
Venue	The cricket ground where the match was played
(H)	Home ground
(A)	Away ground
Start date	Starting date of the Test match
Result	Result of the match for England
Series (result)	What series the match was part of, with the result listed in brackets; England's tally first (i.e. (2–1) means that England won two matches, and their opponents won one match)

== Matches ==
England Test cricket results between 1940 and 1959
No. (Eng.)	No. (Ove.)	Opposition	Venue	Start date	Result	Series (result)
244	276	India	Lord's, London (H)	22 June 1946	Won by 10 wickets	Indian cricket team in England in 1946 (1–0)
245	277	India	Old Trafford, Manchester (H)	20 July 1946	Match drawn	Indian cricket team in England in 1946 (1–0)
246	278	India	The Oval, London (H)	17 August 1946	Match drawn	Indian cricket team in England in 1946 (1–0)
247	279	Australia	The Gabba, Brisbane (A)	29 November 1946	Lost by an innings and 332 runs	1946–47 Ashes series (0–3)
248	280	Australia	Sydney Cricket Ground, Sydney (A)	13 December 1946	Lost by an innings and 33 runs	1946–47 Ashes series (0–3)
249	281	Australia	Melbourne Cricket Ground, Melbourne (A)	1 January 1947	Match drawn	1946–47 Ashes series (0–3)
250	282	Australia	Adelaide Oval, Adelaide (A)	31 January 1947	Match drawn	1946–47 Ashes series (0–3)
251	283	Australia	Sydney Cricket Ground, Sydney (A)	28 February 1947	Lost by 5 wickets	1946–47 Ashes series (0–3)
252	284	New Zealand	Lancaster Park, Christchurch (A)	21 March 1947	Match drawn	English cricket team in New Zealand in 1946–47 (0–0)
253	285	South Africa	Trent Bridge, Nottingham (H)	7 June 1947	Match drawn	South African cricket team in England in 1947 (3–0)
254	286	South Africa	Lord's, London (H)	21 June 1947	Won by 10 wickets	South African cricket team in England in 1947 (3–0)
255	287	South Africa	Old Trafford, Manchester (H)	5 July 1947	Won by 7 wickets	South African cricket team in England in 1947 (3–0)
256	288	South Africa	Headingley, Leeds (H)	26 July 1947	Won by 10 wickets	South African cricket team in England in 1947 (3–0)
257	289	South Africa	The Oval, London (H)	16 August 1947	Match drawn	South African cricket team in England in 1947 (3–0)
258	293	West Indies	Kensington Oval, Bridgetown (A)	21 January 1948	Match drawn	English cricket team in the West Indies in 1947–48 (0–2)
259	296	West Indies	Queen's Park Oval, Port of Spain (A)	11 February 1948	Match drawn	English cricket team in the West Indies in 1947–48 (0–2)
260	297	West Indies	Bourda, Georgetown (A)	3 March 1948	Lost by 7 wickets	English cricket team in the West Indies in 1947–48 (0–2)
261	298	West Indies	Sabina Park, Kingston (A)	27 March 1948	Lost by 10 wickets	English cricket team in the West Indies in 1947–48 (0–2)
262	299	Australia	Trent Bridge, Nottingham (H)	10 June 1948	Lost by 8 wickets	1948 Ashes series (0–4)
263	300	Australia	Lord's, London (H)	24 June 1948	Lost by 409 runs	1948 Ashes series (0–4)
264	301	Australia	Old Trafford, Manchester (H)	8 July 1948	Match drawn	1948 Ashes series (0–4)
265	302	Australia	Headingley, Leeds (H)	22 July 1948	Lost by 7 wickets	1948 Ashes series (0–4)
266	303	Australia	The Oval, London (H)	14 August 1948	Lost by an innings and 149 runs	1948 Ashes series (0–4)
267	306	South Africa	Kingsmead, Durban (A)	16 December 1948	Won by 2 wickets	English cricket team in South Africa in 1948–49 (2–0)
268	307	South Africa	Wanderers Stadium, Johannesburg (A)	27 December 1948	Match drawn	English cricket team in South Africa in 1948–49 (2–0)
269	309	South Africa	Newlands Cricket Ground, Cape Town (A)	1 January 1949	Match drawn	English cricket team in South Africa in 1948–49 (2–0)
270	312	South Africa	Wanderers Stadium, Johannesburg (A)	12 February 1949	Match drawn	English cricket team in South Africa in 1948–49 (2–0)
271	313	South Africa	St George's Park Cricket Ground, Port Elizabeth (A)	5 March 1949	Won by 3 wickets	English cricket team in South Africa in 1948–49 (2–0)
272	314	New Zealand	Headingley, Leeds (H)	11 June 1949	Match drawn	New Zealand cricket team in England in 1949 (0–0)
273	315	New Zealand	Lord's, London (H)	25 June 1949	Match drawn	New Zealand cricket team in England in 1949 (0–0)
274	316	New Zealand	Old Trafford, Manchester (H)	23 July 1949	Match drawn	New Zealand cricket team in England in 1949 (0–0)
275	317	New Zealand	The Oval, London (H)	13 August 1949	Match drawn	New Zealand cricket team in England in 1949 (0–0)
276	323	West Indies	Old Trafford, Manchester (H)	8 June 1950	Won by 202 runs	West Indian cricket team in England in 1950 (1–3)
277	324	West Indies	Lord's, London (H)	24 June 1950	Lost by 326 runs	West Indian cricket team in England in 1950 (1–3)
278	325	West Indies	Trent Bridge, Nottingham (H)	20 July 1950	Lost by 10 wickets	West Indian cricket team in England in 1950 (1–3)
279	326	West Indies	The Oval, London (H)	12 August 1950	Lost by an innings and 56 runs	West Indian cricket team in England in 1950 (1–3)
280	327	Australia	The Gabba, Brisbane (A)	1 December 1950	Lost by 70 runs	1950–51 Ashes series (1–4)
281	328	Australia	Melbourne Cricket Ground, Melbourne (A)	22 December 1950	Lost by 28 runs	1950–51 Ashes series (1–4)
282	329	Australia	Sydney Cricket Ground, Sydney (A)	5 January 1951	Lost by an innings and 13 runs	1950–51 Ashes series (1–4)
283	330	Australia	Adelaide Oval, Adelaide (A)	2 February 1951	Lost by 274 runs	1950–51 Ashes series (1–4)
284	331	Australia	Melbourne Cricket Ground, Melbourne (A)	23 February 1951	Won by 8 wickets	1950–51 Ashes series (1–4)
285	332	New Zealand	Lancaster Park, Christchurch (A)	17 March 1951	Match drawn	English cricket team in New Zealand in 1950–51 (1–0)
286	333	New Zealand	Basin Reserve, Wellington (A)	24 March 1951	Won by 6 wickets	English cricket team in New Zealand in 1950–51 (1–0)
287	334	South Africa	Trent Bridge, Nottingham (H)	7 June 1951	Lost by 71 runs	South African cricket team in England in 1951 (3–1)
288	335	South Africa	Lord's, London (H)	21 June 1951	Won by 10 wickets	South African cricket team in England in 1951 (3–1)
289	336	South Africa	Old Trafford, Manchester (H)	5 July 1951	Won by 9 wickets	South African cricket team in England in 1951 (3–1)
290	337	South Africa	Headingley, Leeds (H)	26 July 1951	Match drawn	South African cricket team in England in 1951 (3–1)
291	338	South Africa	The Oval, London (H)	16 August 1951	Won by 4 wickets	South African cricket team in England in 1951 (3–1)
292	339	India	Feroz Shah Kotla Ground, Delhi (A)	2 November 1951	Match drawn	English cricket team in India in 1951–52 (1–1)
293	342	India	Brabourne Stadium, Mumbai (A)	14 December 1951	Match drawn	English cricket team in India in 1951–52 (1–1)
294	344	India	Eden Gardens, Calcutta (A)	30 December 1951	Match drawn	English cricket team in India in 1951–52 (1–1)
295	346	India	Green Park Stadium, Kanpur (A)	12 January 1952	Won by 8 wickets	English cricket team in India in 1951–52 (1–1)
296	348	India	M. A. Chidambaram Stadium, Chennai (A)	6 February 1952	Lost by an innings and 8 runs	English cricket team in India in 1951–52 (1–1)
297	351	India	Headingley, Leeds (H)	5 June 1952	Won by 7 wickets	Indian cricket team in England in 1952 (3–0)
298	352	India	Lord's, London (H)	19 June 1952	Won by 8 wickets	Indian cricket team in England in 1952 (3–0)
299	353	India	Old Trafford, Manchester (H)	17 July 1952	Won by an innings and 207 runs	Indian cricket team in England in 1952 (3–0)
300	354	India	The Oval, London (H)	14 August 1952	Match drawn	Indian cricket team in England in 1952 (3–0)
301	372	Australia	Trent Bridge, Nottingham (H)	11 June 1953	Match drawn	1953 Ashes series (1–0)
302	373	Australia	Lord's, London (H)	25 June 1953	Match drawn	1953 Ashes series (1–0)
303	374	Australia	Old Trafford, Manchester (H)	9 July 1953	Match drawn	1953 Ashes series (1–0)
304	375	Australia	Headingley, Leeds (H)	23 July 1953	Match drawn	1953 Ashes series (1–0)
305	376	Australia	The Oval, London (H)	15 August 1953	Won by 8 wickets	1953 Ashes series (1–0)
306	380	West Indies	Sabina Park, Kingston (A)	15 January 1954	Lost by 140 runs	English cricket team in the West Indies in 1953–54 (2–2)
307	383	West Indies	Kensington Oval, Bridgetown (A)	6 February 1954	Lost by 181 runs	English cricket team in the West Indies in 1953–54 (2–2)
308	384	West Indies	Bourda, Georgetown (A)	24 February 1954	Won by 9 wickets	English cricket team in the West Indies in 1953–54 (2–2)
309	385	West Indies	Queen's Park Oval, Port of Spain (A)	17 March 1954	Match drawn	English cricket team in the West Indies in 1953–54 (2–2)
310	386	West Indies	Sabina Park, Kingston (A)	30 March 1954	Won by 9 wickets	English cricket team in the West Indies in 1953–54 (2–2)
311	387	Pakistan	Lord's, London (H)	10 June 1954	Match drawn	Pakistani cricket team in England in 1954 (1–1)
312	388	Pakistan	Trent Bridge, Nottingham (H)	1 July 1954	Won by an innings and 129 runs	Pakistani cricket team in England in 1954 (1–1)
313	389	Pakistan	Old Trafford, Manchester (H)	22 July 1954	Match drawn	Pakistani cricket team in England in 1954 (1–1)
314	390	Pakistan	The Oval, London (H)	12 August 1954	Lost by 24 runs	Pakistani cricket team in England in 1954 (1–1)
315	391	Australia	The Gabba, Brisbane (A)	26 November 1954	Lost by an innings and 154 runs	1954–55 Ashes series (3–1)
316	392	Australia	Sydney Cricket Ground, Sydney (A)	17 December 1954	Won by 38 runs	1954–55 Ashes series (3–1)
317	393	Australia	Melbourne Cricket Ground, Melbourne (A)	31 December 1954	Won by 128 runs	1954–55 Ashes series (3–1)
318	396	Australia	Adelaide Oval, Adelaide (A)	28 January 1955	Won by 5 wickets	1954–55 Ashes series (3–1)
319	399	Australia	Sydney Cricket Ground, Sydney (A)	25 February 1955	Match drawn	1954–55 Ashes series (3–1)
320	401	New Zealand	University Oval, Dunedin (A)	11 March 1955	Won by 8 wickets	English cricket team in New Zealand in 1954–55 (2–0)
321	402	New Zealand	Eden Park, Auckland (A)	25 March 1955	Won by an innings and 20 runs	English cricket team in New Zealand in 1954–55 (2–0)
322	407	South Africa	Trent Bridge, Nottingham (H)	9 June 1955	Won by an innings and 5 runs	South African cricket team in England in 1955 (3–2)
323	409	South Africa	Lord's, London (H)	23 June 1955	Won by 71 runs	South African cricket team in England in 1955 (3–2)
324	410	South Africa	Old Trafford, Manchester (H)	7 July 1955	Lost by 3 wickets	South African cricket team in England in 1955 (3–2)
325	411	South Africa	Headingley, Leeds (H)	21 July 1955	Lost by 224 runs	South African cricket team in England in 1955 (3–2)
326	412	South Africa	The Oval, London (H)	13 August 1955	Won by 92 runs	South African cricket team in England in 1955 (3–2)
327	425	Australia	Trent Bridge, Nottingham (H)	7 June 1956	Match drawn	1956 Ashes series (2–1)
328	426	Australia	Lord's, London (H)	21 June 1956	Lost by 185 runs	1956 Ashes series (2–1)
329	427	Australia	Headingley, Leeds (H)	12 July 1956	Won by an innings and 42 runs	1956 Ashes series (2–1)
330	428	Australia	Old Trafford, Manchester (H)	26 July 1956	Won by an innings and 170 runs	1956 Ashes series (2–1)
331	429	Australia	The Oval, London (H)	23 August 1956	Match drawn	1956 Ashes series (2–1)
332	434	South Africa	Wanderers Stadium, Johannesburg (A)	24 December 1956	Won by 131 runs	English cricket team in South Africa in 1956–57 (2–2)
333	435	South Africa	Newlands Cricket Ground, Cape Town (A)	1 January 1957	Won by 312 runs	English cricket team in South Africa in 1956–57 (2–2)
334	436	South Africa	Kingsmead, Durban (A)	25 January 1957	Match drawn	English cricket team in South Africa in 1956–57 (2–2)
335	437	South Africa	Wanderers Stadium, Johannesburg (A)	15 February 1957	Lost by 17 runs	English cricket team in South Africa in 1956–57 (2–2)
336	438	South Africa	St George's Park Cricket Ground, Port Elizabeth (A)	1 March 1957	Lost by 58 runs	English cricket team in South Africa in 1956–57 (2–2)
337	439	West Indies	Edgbaston, Birmingham (H)	30 May 1957	Match drawn	West Indian cricket team in England in 1957 (3–0)
338	440	West Indies	Lord's, London (H)	20 June 1957	Won by an innings and 36 runs	West Indian cricket team in England in 1957 (3–0)
339	441	West Indies	Trent Bridge, Nottingham (H)	4 July 1957	Match drawn	West Indian cricket team in England in 1957 (3–0)
340	442	West Indies	Headingley, Leeds (H)	25 July 1957	Won by an innings and 5 runs	West Indian cricket team in England in 1957 (3–0)
341	443	West Indies	The Oval, London (H)	22 August 1957	Won by an innings and 237 runs	West Indian cricket team in England in 1957 (3–0)
342	454	New Zealand	Edgbaston, Birmingham (H)	5 June 1958	Won by 205 runs	New Zealand cricket team in England in 1958 (4–0)
343	455	New Zealand	Lord's, London (H)	19 June 1958	Won by an innings and 248 runs	New Zealand cricket team in England in 1958 (4–0)
344	456	New Zealand	Headingley, Leeds (H)	3 July 1958	Won by an innings and 71 runs	New Zealand cricket team in England in 1958 (4–0)
345	457	New Zealand	Old Trafford, Manchester (H)	24 July 1958	Won by an innings and 13 runs	New Zealand cricket team in England in 1958 (4–0)
346	458	New Zealand	The Oval, London (H)	21 August 1958	Match drawn	New Zealand cricket team in England in 1958 (4–0)
347	460	Australia	The Gabba, Brisbane (A)	5 December 1958	Lost by 8 wickets	1958–59 Ashes series (0–4)
348	462	Australia	Melbourne Cricket Ground, Melbourne (A)	31 December 1958	Lost by 8 wickets	1958–59 Ashes series (0–4)
349	464	Australia	Sydney Cricket Ground, Sydney (A)	9 January 1959	Match drawn	1958–59 Ashes series (0–4)
350	466	Australia	Adelaide Oval, Adelaide (A)	30 January 1959	Lost by 10 wickets	1958–59 Ashes series (0–4)
351	468	Australia	Melbourne Cricket Ground, Melbourne (A)	13 February 1959	Lost by 9 wickets	1958–59 Ashes series (0–4)
352	470	New Zealand	Lancaster Park, Christchurch (A)	27 February 1959	Won by an innings and 99 runs	English cricket team in New Zealand in 1958–59 (1–0)
353	472	New Zealand	Eden Park, Auckland (A)	14 March 1959	Match drawn	English cricket team in New Zealand in 1958–59 (1–0)
354	474	India	Trent Bridge, Nottingham (H)	4 June 1959	Won by an innings and 59 runs	Indian cricket team in England in 1959 (5–0)
355	475	India	Lord's, London (H)	18 June 1959	Won by 8 wickets	Indian cricket team in England in 1959 (5–0)
356	476	India	Headingley, Leeds (H)	2 July 1959	Won by an innings and 173 runs	Indian cricket team in England in 1959 (5–0)
357	477	India	Old Trafford, Manchester (H)	23 July 1959	Won by 171 runs	Indian cricket team in England in 1959 (5–0)
358	478	India	The Oval, London (H)	20 August 1959	Won by an innings and 27 runs	Indian cricket team in England in 1959 (5–0)

== Summary ==
Team	Total matches					Home matches					Away matches				
Team	Mat	Won	Lost	Draw	W/L	Mat	Won	Lost	Draw	W/L	Mat	Won	Lost	Draw	W/L
Australia	35	7	17	11	0.411	15	3	5	7	0.600	20	4	12	4	0.333
India	17	10	1	6	10.000	12	9	0	3	–	5	1	1	3	1.000
New Zealand	16	8	0	8	–	9	4	0	5	–	7	4	0	3	–
Pakistan	4	1	1	2	1.000	4	1	1	2	1.000	–	–	–	–	–
South Africa	25	13	5	7	2.600	15	9	3	3	3.000	10	4	2	4	2.000
West Indies	18	6	7	5	0.857	9	4	3	2	1.333	9	2	4	3	0.500
Total	115	45	31	39	1.451	64	30	12	22	2.500	51	15	19	17	0.789
