= List of international cricket five-wicket hauls by Fred Trueman =

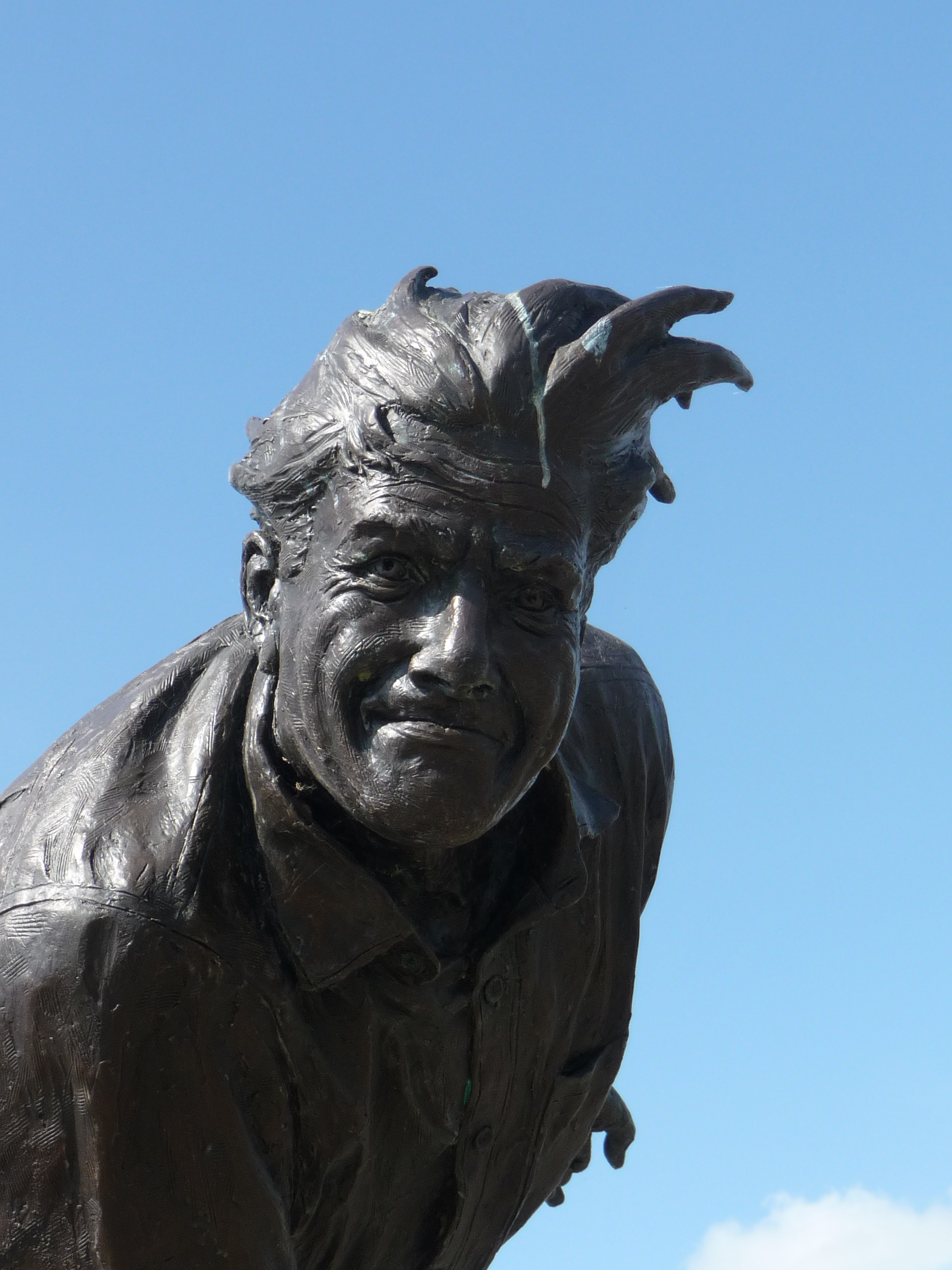
Statue of Trueman, who took seventeen five-wicket hauls in Test cricket.

Fred Trueman was an English cricketer, an "aggressive" fast bowler widely known as "Fiery Fred". He is generally acknowledged to have been one of the greatest bowlers in cricket history. He represented England in 67 Test matches, and was the first bowler to take 300 wickets in a Test career, taking twelve years and 65 Tests to reach the landmark.

Trueman's wicket tally included seventeen five-wicket hauls (also known as "five-fors" or "fifers") which refer to a bowler taking five or more wickets in a single innings. This is regarded as a notable achievement, as of October 2024, only 54 bowlers have taken 15 or more five-wicket hauls at international level in their cricketing careers. Trueman's seventeen five-wicket hauls places him joint-third in a list of most five-wicket hauls by England Test players, behind Ian Botham and Sydney Barnes. It includes three instances of him taking five or more wickets in each innings of the same Test match, and only one of the Tests in which he took a five-for ended in defeat for England.

His first five-for came in July 1952 against India in only his third Test match. It was also his career-best performance, eight wickets while conceding 31 runs, which remains the ninth most successful bowling figures by an England player. Five of his five-wicket hauls were taken against Australia, and six came against the West Indies. Four of the latter came during the 1963 West Indies tour of England, across which he took a career-best 34 wickets. He is joint-third in a tally of most five-fors taken against the West Indies in Test matches. He did not get the opportunity to play in One Day International cricket as it was not introduced until the 1970–1971 cricket season, several years after his retirement.

== Key ==
- Date – Date the match was held, starting date of the match for Test matches.
- Overs – Number of overs bowled in that innings
- Runs – Runs conceded
- Wkts – Number of wickets taken
- Batsmen – The batsmen whose wickets were taken in the five wicket haul.
- Econ – Bowling economy rate (average runs per over).
- Inn – The innings of the match in which the five wicket haul was taken.
- Result – The result for the England team in that match
- ♠ – 10 wickets or more taken in the match.

Note: Regular Man of the match awards did not enter Test cricket until the 1980s, after Trueman had retired.

== Tests ==
No.	Date	Ground	Against	Inn.	Overs	Runs	Wkts	Econ.	Batsmen	Result
1	17 July 1952	Old Trafford, Manchester	India	2	8.4	31	8	3.57	P Roy; HR Adhikari; PR Umrigar; DG Phadkar; VL Manjrekar; RV Divecha; GS Ramchand; PK Sen	Won
2	14 August 1952	The Oval, London	India	2	16	48	5	3.00	P Roy; HR Adhikari; MH Mankad; DG Phadkar; PK Sen	Draw
3	21 June 1956	Lord's Cricket Ground, London	Australia	3	28	90	5	3.21	RN Harvey; JW Burke; PJP Burge; KR Miller; R Benaud	Lost
4	4 July 1957	Trent Bridge, Nottingham	West Indies	2	30	63	5	2.10	ED Weekes; OG Smith; DS Atkinson; JDC Goddard; AL Valentine	Draw
5	5 June 1958	Edgbaston, Birmingham	New Zealand	2	21	31	5	1.47	LSM Miller; JW D'Arcy; WR Playle; T Meale; JC Alabaster	Won
6	28 January 1960	Queen's Park Oval, Port of Spain	West Indies	2	21	35	5	1.66	RB Kanhai; GS Sobers; FMM Worrell; FCM Alexander; S Ramadhin	Won
7	7 July 1960	Trent Bridge, Nottingham	South Africa	2	14.3	27	5	1.86	DJ McGlew; S O'Linn; HJ Tayfield; JE Pothecary; NAT Adcock	Won
8	6 July 1961	Headingley, Leeds	Australia	1	22	58	5♠	2.63	NC O'Neill; RN Harvey; RB Simpson; R Benaud; ATW Grout	Won
9	6 July 1961	Headingley, Leeds	Australia	3	15.5	30	6♠	1.89	RN Harvey; NC O'Neill; RB Simpson; R Benaud; ATW Grout; AK Davidson	Won
10	21 June 1962	Lord's Cricket Ground, London	Pakistan	1	17.4	31	6	1.75	Hanif Mohammad; Javed Burki; Mushtaq Mohammad; W Mathias; Nasim-ul-Ghani; Mohammad Farooq	Won
11	29 December 1962	Melbourne, Melbourne	Australia	3	20	62	5	2.32	RB Simpson; NC O'Neill; KD Mackay; R Benaud; GD McKenzie	Won
12	15 March 1963	Lancaster Park, Christchurch	New Zealand	1	30.2	75	7	2.47	WR Playle; BW Sinclair; MJF Shrimpton; AE Dick; RW Blair; RC Motz; FJ Cameron	Won
13	20 June 1963	Lord's Cricket Ground, London	West Indies	1	44	100	6♠	2.27	EDAS McMorris; CC Hunte; BF Butcher; RB Kanhai; FMM Worrell; DL Murray	Draw
14	20 June 1963	Lord's Cricket Ground, London	West Indies	3	26	52	5♠	2.00	EDAS McMorris; GS Sobers; FMM Worrell; DL Murray; WW Hall	Draw
15	4 July 1963	Edgbaston, Birmingham	West Indies	2	26	75	5♠	2.88	CC Hunte; MC Carew; GS Sobers; CC Griffith; LR Gibbs	Won
16	4 July 1963	Edgbaston, Birmingham	West Indies	4	14.3	44	7♠	3.03	CC Hunte; RB Kanhai; FMM Worrell; DL Murray; WW Hall; CC Griffith; JS Solomon	Won
17	18 June 1964	Lord's Cricket Ground, London	Australia	1	25	48	5	1.92	WM Lawry; BC Booth; RB Simpson; GD McKenzie; GE Corling	Draw
