= New Zealand cricket team in Pakistan in 1955–56 =

International cricket tour

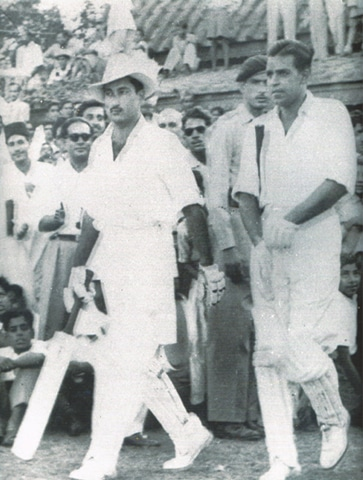
Waqar Hasan (left) and Imtiaz Ahmed (right) come out to bat during the second test

The New Zealand national cricket team toured Pakistan in October and November 1955 and played a three-match Test series against the Pakistan national cricket team. It was the first Test series between the two teams. Pakistan won the Test series 2–0. New Zealand were captained by Harry Cave and Pakistan by Abdul Hafeez Kardar.

After the Test series, the team went on to India, where they played a five-Test series.

== New Zealand team ==
- Harry Cave (captain)
- John Reid (vice-captain)
- Jack Alabaster
- John Guy
- Noel Harford
- Zin Harris
- Johnny Hayes
- Graham Leggat
- Tony MacGibbon
- Noel McGregor
- Trevor McMahon
- Alex Moir
- Eric Petrie
- Matt Poore
- Bert Sutcliffe

Every player played at least one Test in the series. Cave, Reid, MacGibbon, McGregor, Moir, Poore and Sutcliffe played all three Tests.

The team was managed by Henry Cooper, who was at the time headmaster of Auckland Grammar School, and had previously played three first-class matches for Auckland.

== Test series summary ==
=== First Test ===
13–17 October 1955
(5-day match)
Scorecard

New Zealand	v	Pakistan
164 (133.2 overs); MB Poore 43; Zulfiqar Ahmed 5/37 (37.2 overs)		289 (130.1 overs); Imtiaz Ahmed 64; AR McGibbon 4/98 (37.1 overs)
124 (108.3 overs); JG Leggat 39; Zulfiqar Ahmed 6/42 (46.3 overs)

Pakistan won by an innings and 1 run
National Stadium, Karachi
Umpires: Idrees Baig and Shujauddin

- New Zealand won the toss and elected to bat.
- 15 October was taken as a rest day.
- The match was scheduled for five days but completed in four.
- JC Alabaster, PGZ Harris and TG McMahon (all NZ) made their Test debuts.

=== Second Test ===
26–31 October 1955
(5-day match)
Scorecard

New Zealand	v	Pakistan
348 (160.5 overs); SN McGregor 111; Khan Mohammad 4/78 (34 overs)		561 (185.3 overs); Imtiaz Ahmed 209; AM Moir 4/114 (39 overs)
328 (158.2 overs); JR Reid 86; Zulfiqar Ahmed 4/114 (43.2 overs)		117/6 (26.5 overs); Alimuddin 37; JR Reid 4/38 (8 overs)

Pakistan won by 4 wickets
Bagh-e-Jinnah, Lahore
Umpires: Daud Khan and Idrees Baig

- New Zealand won the toss and elected to bat.
- 28 October were taken as rest days.
- NS Harford and EC Petrie (both NZ) made their Test debuts.

=== Third Test ===
7–12 November 1955
(5-day match)
Scorecard

New Zealand	v	Pakistan
70 (39.2 overs); AR MacGibbon 29*; Khan Mohammad 6/21 (16.2 overs)		195/6d (76 overs); Hanif Mohammad 103; HB Cave 3/45 (20 overs)
69/6 (90 overs); MB Poore 18; Khan Mohammad 2/20 (30 overs)

Match drawn
Bangabandhu National Stadium, Dhaka, Bangladesh
Umpires: Daud Khan and Idrees Baig

- New Zealand won the toss and elected to bat.
- 10 November was taken as a rest day.
- There was no play on the first three days.
- Agha Saadat Ali and Wallis Mathias (both PAK), and JW Guy (NZ) made their Test debuts.

== See also ==
- New Zealand cricket team in India in 1955–56 from November 1955 to January 1956
