= English cricket team in New Zealand in 1950–51 =

International cricket tour

The England national cricket team toured New Zealand in March 1951 and played a two-match Test series against the New Zealand national cricket team. England won the series 1–0 with one match drawn.

== Test series summary ==
=== First Test ===
17–21 February 1951 (4-day match)
Scorecard

New Zealand	v	England
417/8d (157.2 overs); B Sutcliffe 116; TE Bailey 2/51 (30 overs)		550 (221.3 overs); TE Bailey 134*; AM Moir 6/155 (56.3 overs)
46/3 (13 overs); JA Hayes 19; RT Simpson 2/4 (4 overs)

Match drawn
Lancaster Park, Christchurch
Umpires: EG Brook and SB Tomkinson

- New Zealand won the toss and elected to bat.
- 18 March was taken as a rest day.
- AR MacGibbon, AM Moir and JA Hayes (all NZ), and JB Statham (ENG) made their Test debuts.

=== Second Test ===
24–28 March 1951 (4-day match)
Scorecard

New Zealand	v	England
125 (70 overs); AM Moir 26*; DVP Wright 5/48 (19 overs)		227 (97 overs); L Hutton 57; GF Cresswell 3/18 (15 overs)
189 (72.2 overs); VJ Scott 60; R Tattersall 6/44 (21 overs)		91/4 (45.2 overs); L Hutton 29; GF Cresswell 2/31 (18 overs)

England won by 6 wickets
Basin Reserve, Wellington
Umpires: JM McLellan and MF Pengelly

- New Zealand won the toss and elected to bat.
- 24 March was taken as a rest day.
- There was no play on the first day.
