= C. G. Howard's cricket team in India in 1956–57 =

International cricket tour (1956–57)

An English cricket team managed and selected by Geoffrey Howard toured India in the 1956–57 season. They played two first class matches between 30 December 1956 and 8 January 1957, winning one and losing one.

The tour coincided with the English tour of South Africa, thus no players who were part of that touring party played on this tour. Neither were any of the players that had beaten Australia in the final Test of 1956. Nevertheless, with the exception of wicket-keeper Jock Livingston the entire touring party of twelve had previous Test experience, eight of them for England and three of them for Australia.

== Touring party ==
Name	Age	Style	Domestic team	Tour statistics				
Name	Age	Style	Domestic team	Mat	Runs	Bat avg	Wkts	Bowl avg
Bill Edrich (c)	40	RHB, RFM	Middlesex	2	125	31.25	0	
Alec Bedser	38	RHB, RMF	Surrey	2	10	5.00	2	59.50
Bruce Dooland	33	RHB, LBG	Nottinghamshire	2	33	11.00	8	28.12
Tom Graveney	29	RHB, LB	Gloucestershire	2	284	94.66		
Jock Livingston	36	LHB, WK	Northamptonshire	1	29	29.00	0	
Colin McCool	40	RHB, (WK)	Somerset	1	24	12.00	0	
Alan Moss	28	RHB, RFM	Middlesex	2	13	6.50	4	25.25
Reg Simpson	36	RHB, OB	Nottinghamshire	2	97	24.25		
George Tribe	36	LHB, SLW	Northamptonshire	2	54	18.00	11	13.45
Fred Trueman	25	RHB, RF	Yorkshire	2	96	48.00	8	25.50
Alan Wharton	33	LHB, RM	Lancashire	2	101	25.25	0	
Willie Watson	36	LHB	Yorkshire	2	102	25.50		

== Matches ==
=== 30 December–2 January: Bengal Chief Minister's XI vs CG Howard's XI ===
Bengal Chief Minister's XI
149
&
379/8d
Bengal Chief Minister's XI won by 142 runs

MH Mankad 32
GE Tribe 4/41

NJ Contractor 157
AV Bedser 2/66

Eden Gardens, Calcutta, India
Umpires: Sunil Banerjee (Ind) and Santosh Ganguli (Ind)

CG Howard's XI
227/9d
&
158

WJ Edrich 58
Ghulam Ahmed 4/68

FS Trueman 46*
Ghulam Ahmed 4/38

The first match was a part of the celebrations for the silver jubilee of the Bengal Cricket Association. The hosting eleven, representing Bidhan Chandra Roy as Chief Minister of West Bengal, turned a first innings deficit around to a win after the tourists' wicket-keeper Livingston and No. 3 batsman Graveney were both forced to miss the second innings due to illness. Seven of the select XI had featured in the 3-Test series against Australia in October and November, while three of the remaining four had been dropped from the scene in the early 1950s. Nari Contractor had played in the final Test against Australia and now made 73 not out on New Year's Eve and continued towards 157 on New Year's Day. On the first day, the tourists' Australian spinners Dooland and Tribe took seven wickets, before Edrich made 58 for the tourists against the hosts' spinners Ghulam and Subhash Gupte, who shared eight between them. With Livingston and Graveney out, Howard's eleven was 16 for nought overnight on the final day chasing 301 to win, but were bowled out by Ghulam and Vinoo Mankad.

=== 5 January–8 January: Cricket Club of India President's XI vs CG Howard's XI ===
CG Howard's XI
319
&
313/7d
CG Howard's XI won by 152 runs

TW Graveney 153
BP Gupte 4/99

TW Graveney 120
BP Gupte 4/77

Brabourne Stadium, Bombay, India
Umpires: RS Mahajan (Ind) and Ahmed Mansa (Burma)

Cricket Club of India President's XI
171
&
158

PR Umrigar 57
B Dooland 3/38

PR Umrigar 100
G Tribe 3/93

Another strong eleven were fielded by the Cricket Club of India's President at the club's home, the Brabourne Stadium in Bombay. The side included four players who had featured in the Test series against Australia and a further five players with Test experience. The tourists had brought in McCool as replacement for the injured Livingston. It was the only time in first-class cricket that McCool kept wicket and he responded by stumping Vinoo Mankad off the bowling of Dooland. Graveney, who had been taken ill during the previous match, now responded with a pair of centuries as the tourists batted the hosts out of the game. The Cricket Club of India's first innings included a fall from 113 for three to 171 all out after Vijay Hazare retired on 32.

== Tour aftermath ==
From the touring side, Tom Graveney, Alan Moss, Fred Trueman and Willie Watson all returned to the England Test team. Graveney had already played more than 15 Tests for England, though he had been left out of the side for the final three Tests of the 1956 Ashes, but returned to make 472 runs at a batting average over 100 in the 3–0 win over West Indies in 1957. Trueman established himself as a player in that 1957 series, taking 23 wickets after having been in and out of the team since he was first called up to play Indian cricket team in England in 1952. Both played major parts in England Test history well into the 1960s, with Trueman becoming the first player ever to take 300 Test wickets. Moss and Watson featured in a few Tests during the final years of the 1950s, but did not make major contributions.

== Sources ==
- Playfair Cricket Annual
- Wisden Cricketers Almanack
