= English cricket team in New Zealand in 1954–55 =

International cricket tour

The England cricket team toured New Zealand in March 1955 and played a two-match Test series against the New Zealand team. The series was part of a longer tour which began in September 1954 and included a match in Colombo against Ceylon and a full tour of Australia during which the England team retained The Ashes, their first series win in Australia for 22 years. The tour was organised by the Marylebone Cricket Club and the English team played under the name MCC in non-Test matches.

The New Zealand leg of the tour began at the beginning of March, the England team having been away for more than five months on a trip which was the last major MCC tour to use sea travel. It began with a first-class match against Canterbury at Christchurch. A further first-class match was played between the two Test matches against Wellington. England won the Test series 2–0, leaving New Zealand still without a win in a Test match since gaining Test status in 1923.

In the second Test, New Zealand were dismissed for 26 runs in their second innings, the lowest score in Test cricket history. The score was made in New Zealand's second innings and resulted in an innings defeat in the match, despite only trailing by 46 runs after the first innings were completed. It was four runs less than the previous lowest score in Test matches made by South Africa against England in 1896 and 1924 and beat New Zealand's previous lowest Test score of 42 made against Australia in 1946. As of June 2022 it remains the lowest score by a side in a Test match.

Despite being played on slow pitches which made scoring difficult, the matches on the tour were well attended. Gate receipts of £26,000 made the series profitable for the hosts.

== Test series summary ==
=== First Test ===
11–16 March 1955 (5-day match)
Scorecard
Wisden report

New Zealand	v	England
125 (81.2 overs); B Sutcliffe 74; JB Statham 4/24 (17 overs)		209/8d (92.5 overs); MC Cowdrey 42; JR Reid 4/36 (27 overs)
132 (56.3 overs); B Sutcliffe 35; FH Tyson 4/16 (12 overs)		49/2 (15.2 overs); TW Graveney 32; AR MacGibbon 1/16 (7.2 overs)

England won by 8 wickets
Carisbrook, Dunedin
Umpires: RG Currie and SB Tomkinson

- England won the toss and elected to field.
- 13 March was taken as a rest day.
- There was no play on the third or fourth days.
- SN McGregor, L Watt and IA Colquhoun (all NZ) made their Test debuts.

=== Second Test ===
25–28 March 1955 (5-day match)
Scorecard
Wisden report

New Zealand	v	England
200 (88.4 overs); JR Reid 73; JB Statham 4/28 (17.4 overs)		246 (119.1 overs); L Hutton 53; AM Moir 5/62 (25.1 overs)
26 (27 overs); B Sutcliffe 11; R Appleyard 4/7 (6 overs)

England won by an innings and 20 runs
Eden Park, Auckland
Umpires: JC Harris and JM McLellan

- New Zealand won the toss and elected to bat.
- 27 March was taken as a rest day.
- The match was scheduled for five days but completed in three.
- New Zealand’s second innings total of 26 remains the lowest total in Test matches.

== Other matches ==
The first match the England side played in New Zealand was against Canterbury at Lancaster Park, Christchurch. Between the two Test matches a further match was played against Wellington at Basin Reserve. The MCC side won both matches.
