= Idrees Baig =

Pakistani cricket umpire

Personal information
- Full name: Mirza Idrees Baig
- Born: 1911; Delhi, India
- Died: 30 July 1986 (aged 74–75); Karachi, Pakistan
- Batting: Right-handed
- Bowling: Right-arm fast-medium

Domestic team information
- Years: Team
- 1935-36 – 1945-46: Delhi

Umpiring information
- Tests umpired: 9 (1955–1969)
- FC umpired: 46 (1946–1975)

Career statistics
Competition	First-class
Matches	7
Runs scored	292
Batting average	22.46
100s/50s	1/0
Top score	106
Balls bowled	785
Wickets	23
Bowling average	13.60
5 wickets in innings	1
10 wickets in match	0
Best bowling	5/27
Catches/stumpings	1/–
- Source: ESPNcricinfo, 1 September 2015

Mirza Idrees Baig (1911 – 30 July 1986) (also spelled Idris, Beg and Begh) was a Pakistani cricket umpire. He stood in nine Test matches between 1955 and 1969.

== Playing career ==
Idrees Baig played seven first-class matches for Delhi in the Ranji Trophy between 1936 and 1946. (Delhi played only 11 matches in this period.) A middle-order batsman and fast-medium bowler, he scored one century, 106 in the victory over Gwalior in 1943–44, reaching his century in 155 minutes with 18 fours. His best bowling figures were 4 for 29 and 5 for 27 against United Provinces in 1936–37, but they were not enough to prevent a three-wicket loss in a low-scoring match.

== Umpiring career ==
Baig umpired one Ranji Trophy match in 1945–46 (a few weeks after playing in his last match) and 45 first-class matches in Pakistan between 1953–54 and 1974–75. He umpired nine Tests in Pakistan: four in Pakistan's five-match series against India in 1954–55 (the first four Tests in Pakistan), all three Tests against New Zealand in 1955–56, the single Test against Australia in 1956–57, and the First Test against New Zealand in 1969–70. He also umpired all four matches Pakistan played against the Marylebone Cricket Club (MCC) in 1955–56.

He was the subject of a controversial incident in Peshawar during the MCC tour of 1955–56. One evening some of the English players, fed up with what they regarded as Baig's pomposity on the field and his bias in favour of Pakistan, kidnapped him, took him back to their hotel and tipped a bucket of water over him. The incident caused outrage in Pakistan and almost led to the abandonment of the tour, but diplomacy by the MCC president, Lord Alexander, and Iskander Mirza, the president of the Board of Control for Cricket in Pakistan, smoothed things over sufficiently to allow the tour to continue. Peter Oborne, who has researched the incident, doubts if the suggestions of bias were valid. He points out, for example, that Henry Cooper, who managed the New Zealand cricket team that toured Pakistan in 1955, had singled out Baig as the best of the Pakistan umpires, calling him "first rate". Baig does seem to have been more than usually vain, however; he told the MCC team's manager that people came to his matches to watch him umpire.

Baig managed the 1957 tour of England and Wales by the Pakistan Eaglets, a two-month, 35-match tour by young players that "passed harmoniously and highly successfully".

== See also ==
- List of Test cricket umpires
