= William Henry Cooper =

William Henry Cooper may refer to:

- William Cooper (cricketer) (William Henry Cooper, 1849–1939), Australian Test cricketer
- Henry Cooper (educator) (William Henry Cooper, 1909–1990), New Zealand cricketer and educator
