= Trevor McMahon =

New Zealand cricketer (1929–2026)

Personal information
- Full name: Trevor George McMahon
- Born: 8 November 1929; Wellington, New Zealand
- Died: 12 March 2026 (aged 96); Wellington, New Zealand
- Batting: Right-handed
- Role: Wicket-keeper

International information
- National side: New Zealand (1955–1956)
- Test debut (cap 73): 13 October 1955 v Pakistan
- Last Test: 3 February 1956 v West Indies

Career statistics
Competition	Test	First-class
Matches	5	37
Runs scored	7	449
Batting average	2.33	9.97
100s/50s	0/0	0/0
Top score	4*	42
Catches/stumpings	7/1	84/14
- Source: ESPNCricinfo, 1 April 2017

Trevor George McMahon (8 November 1929 – 12 March 2026) was a New Zealand cricketer. A wicket-keeper, he played for New Zealand in five Test matches between October 1955 and February 1956. From October 2020 until his death, McMahon was the oldest living New Zealand Test cricketer.

== Biography ==
McMahon was born in Wellington on 8 November 1929. He studied engineering at Wellington Technical College between 1943 and 1948, playing cricket and rugby for the school. He served an apprenticeship with the railways as a fitter and turner.

He made his first-class debut for Wellington in 1953–54 when Wellington's regular wicket-keeper Frank Mooney was touring South Africa with the Test team. Mooney retired after the 1954–55 Plunket Shield season, and McMahon returned to the side for Wellington's match against the touring MCC. He was selected for the tour of Pakistan and India in 1955–56, where he and his fellow wicket-keeper Eric Petrie each played four of the eight Tests. McMahon played the First Test against the West Indies in New Zealand later that season, but then lost his place to Sammy Guillen, who had topped the batting averages in that season's Plunket Shield. McMahon married a nurse, Dulcie Perry, in Wellington in January 1956, immediately after returning from the tour of Pakistan and India. In his brief Test career, McMahon took seven catches, made one stumping, and scored seven runs in seven innings.

Mike Curtis took over the wicket-keeping for Wellington for the next three seasons, but McMahon returned in 1959–60. Oddly for someone whose last 16 first-class innings had produced only 43 runs, McMahon opened the batting throughout the 1959–60 season. He scored 42 in the first match against Central Districts and 41 in the next against Otago, but only 29 in the next three matches, and he returned to the tail in 1960–61. In 1960–61, he set a new record for the Plunket Shield when he made 23 dismissals (22 caught, one stumped) in the season.

McMahon played for Wellington throughout the 1961–62 season when the Test team was touring South Africa, but the new Test wicket-keeper Artie Dick took over Wellington's wicket-keeping in 1962–63, and McMahon played only a few more matches in 1963–64 and 1964–65.

Following the death of John Richard Reid on 14 October 2020, McMahon became the oldest surviving New Zealand Test cricketer. McMahon and his wife Dulcie were married for 64 years and had four sons. In his final years he lived in a retirement village in the Wellington suburb of Kilbirnie. He died there on 12 March 2026, at the age of 96.
