= Colin McCool =

Australian cricketer (1916–1986)

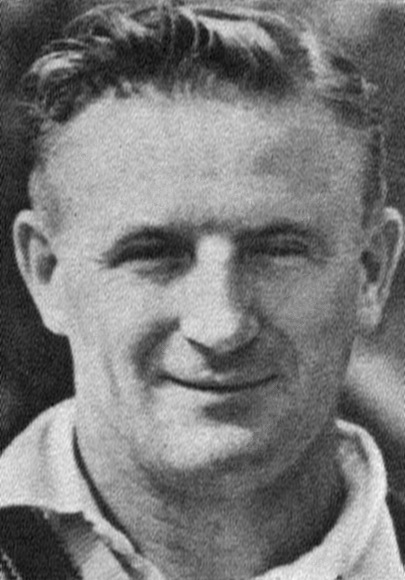

Personal information
- Full name: Colin Leslie McCool
- Born: 9 December 1916; Paddington, New South Wales, Australia
- Died: 5 April 1986 (aged 69); Concord, New South Wales, Australia
- Batting: Right-handed
- Bowling: Right-arm leg spin
- Role: All-rounder

International information
- National side: Australia
- Test debut (cap 166): 29 March 1946 v New Zealand
- Last Test: 3 March 1950 v South Africa

Domestic team information
- Years: Team
- 1939/40–1940/41: New South Wales
- 1945/46–1952/53: Queensland
- 1956–1960: Somerset

Career statistics
| Competition | Test | First-class |
|---|---|---|
| Matches | 14 | 251 |
| Runs scored | 459 | 12,421 |
| Batting average | 35.30 | 32.85 |
| 100s/50s | 1/1 | 18/66 |
| Top score | 104* | 172 |
| Balls bowled | 2,504 | 35,227 |
| Wickets | 36 | 602 |
| Bowling average | 26.61 | 27.47 |
| 5 wickets in innings | 3 | 34 |
| 10 wickets in match | 0 | 2 |
| Best bowling | 5/41 | 8/74 |
| Catches/stumpings | 14/– | 263/2 |
- Source: CricketArchive, 22 December 2007

Colin Leslie McCool (9 December 1916 – 5 April 1986) was an Australian cricketer who played in 14 Test matches between 1946 and 1950. McCool, born in Paddington, New South Wales, was an all-rounder who bowled leg spin and googlies with a round arm action and as a lower order batsman was regarded as effective square of the wicket and against spin bowling. He made his Test début against New Zealand in 1946, taking a wicket with his second delivery. He was part of Donald Bradman's Invincibles team that toured England in 1948 but injury saw him miss selection in any of the Test matches.

A good tour of South Africa in 1949–50 was followed by a lack of opportunity in the next two seasons, leading McCool to sign a contract to play professional cricket in the Lancashire League in 1953. Three years later, Somerset County Cricket Club recruited McCool where he was a success, especially as a middle-order batsman; he played five seasons and saw the club achieve its highest place in the County Championship since 1892. He retired from cricket in 1960 and returned to Australia to work as a market gardener. He died in Concord, New South Wales on 5 April 1986.

== Early career ==
As a child growing up in Paddington, McCool attended Crown Street State School—earlier students included Victor Trumper and Monty Noble. He played his childhood cricket on concrete wickets in Moore Park and learnt to bowl from reading Clarrie Grimmett's instructional book, Getting Wickets. McCool played his early grade cricket with Paddington Cricket Club before coming to the notice of the New South Wales selectors. He made his first-class début for New South Wales against "Rest of Australia" in March 1940, making 19 and 15 and taking one wicket. While the Australian Cricket Board suspended the Sheffield Shield competition at the end of the 1939–40 season, at the request of the Australian government, a series of matches were arranged to raise money for wartime charities in the following 1940–41 season. McCool played in six of these matches for New South Wales, scoring 416 runs at average of 52.00 and taking 24 wickets at an average of 23.50.

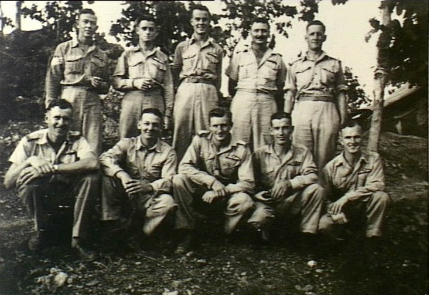
McCool with fellow members of the No. 33 Squadron at Laloki River, New Guinea circa 1943. McCool is in the front row, centre.

McCool enlisted on 12 September 1941 and served as a Pilot Officer with the No. 33 Squadron of the Royal Australian Air Force (RAAF). Stationed in New Guinea, McCool had reached the rank of Flight Lieutenant when he was discharged from the RAAF on 18 September 1945.

After the war, he moved to Toombul District Cricket Club in Brisbane and was selected in the Queensland cricket team. Playing for Queensland, he formed a formidable partnership with wicket-keeper Don Tallon, who also played for Toombul. He was selected in the Australian team to tour New Zealand in 1945–46, making his Test début at the Basin Reserve in Wellington. He made seven runs in Australia's only innings and took a wicket with his second ball in Test cricket; the last man dismissed in the Test, Don McRae.

== Test player ==
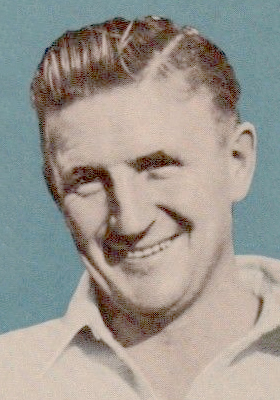
McCool on a 1948 card

The following season, Wally Hammond's England cricket team travelled to Australia for the 1946–47 Ashes series. In a warm-up match before the series, McCool performed well for Queensland against the English tourists at the Brisbane Cricket Ground (the 'Gabba), taking nine wickets and "the English batsmen seemed like rabbits fascinated in the presence of a snake". He was selected for the First Test at the same ground the following week. He just missed out on a century on his Ashes debut, scoring 95 and only bowling one over as Australia won the Test by an innings and 332 runs. In the Second Test at Sydney, McCool took eight wickets, including the prize wicket of Hammond twice. Australia won by an innings and 33 runs. The Third Test at Melbourne saw McCool make his maiden Test century, 104 not out in a drawn match. The Melbourne businessman and underworld figure, John Wren had promised McCool one pound for every run he made that innings; this was at a time when ten pounds was the average weekly wage in Australia. The cheque—given to McCool the next day—allowed him to place a deposit on a house.

He played in the remaining two Tests, making 272 runs at an average of 54 and taking 18 wickets at just over 27 apiece. He took 5/44 in the Fifth Test. Wisden Cricketers' Almanack wrote that his batting featured "wristy cuts" and "vigorous hooks", opining that there were "few better players of spin bowling on a difficult pitch". Wisden said that his slow and loopy leg spin was "a clever mixture of leg-breaks and googlies".

India toured Australia for the first time in 1947–48. McCool played in three Tests without much success, scoring only 46 runs and taking only four wickets. Nevertheless, he was selected as part of Australian team to tour England in 1948 that would be known as the Invincibles. He took 57 wickets on the tour but bowling for long periods caused him to continually tear a callus on his third finger, used to impart spin on the ball. As a result, his captain, Don Bradman, felt compelled to leave him out of the Test matches, feeling that his finger would not be able to handle the necessarily long bowling spells. This decision was aided by the then existing rule allowing a new ball to be used every 55 overs, allowing Bradman to use his fast bowlers more often. For the rest of his career, McCool was troubled by the skin rubbing off his spinning finger. McCool and his fellow fringe members of the squad, Ron Hamence and Doug Ring, would refer themselves as the "ground-staff" as it was unlikely that the tour selectors would include them in the Test team that tour. The cricket writer Alan Gibson, who knew McCool well in his later cricket career at Somerset, wrote that the omission "distressed him greatly at the time, though he could be philosophical enough about it later".

He played in all five Tests on tour against South Africa. He took 51 wickets in all matches, including 5/41 in the Second Test at Newlands. In 1950–51, McCool was the leading wicket taker in the Sheffield Shield competition, however he was not selected in the Test team against the touring English; nor against the West Indies the following season.

== English cricket ==
Prior to the 1953 Australian team to tour England, McCool signed a professional contract with Lancashire League team East Lancashire, replacing fellow Australian leg spinner Bruce Dooland. In his first season in the league, he was the leading wicket-taker with 93 wickets at the low average of 10.2 runs per wicket, and he also made 678 runs at an average of 33.9. The following year, he played less often: his 547 runs came at the better average of 42.1 but his 52 wickets cost 13.1 apiece, and East Lancashire, who had finished either first or second in the Championship ten times in the previous twelve seasons, finished 10th out of 14. He did not return to East Lancashire for the 1955 season due to being contracted to play county cricket for Somerset. The cricket writer Alan Gibson, who knew McCool well, wrote that "after he had made the decision to come, an extension of the qualifying period for overseas cricketers kept him waiting even longer".

Delayed by the change to the rules, McCool had a five-year stint from 1956 in English county cricket. Somerset, having finished on the bottom of the County Championship table for the four years between 1952 and 1955, had embarked on a renewal programme. Part of the programme involved a vigorous recruiting campaign, including an offer to McCool that saw him return to first-class cricket at the age of 39.

At Somerset, McCool was an instant success as a batsman, scoring 1,967 runs in his first season, including three centuries and a highest score of 141. After four seasons, Somerset came off the bottom of the County Championship (to 15th out of 17), and Wisden was in no doubt of McCool's influence: "Much of the credit for the all-round improvement went to one man – McCool," it wrote. "At the start of the season it was hoped that the former Australian Test leg-break bowler would lend power and variety to the attack. From that viewpoint his 45 wickets at over thirty runs apiece might be counted disappointing. But with the bat McCool exceeded all expectations. He was one of the most consistent scorers in the country and he failed by only 34 to reach 2,000 runs in his first season of county cricket. McCool was the backbone of a mediocre batting side, and he never departed from his natural attacking style." Against the touring Australians that season he made 90 and 116, the first innings 90 coming out of 139 in two-and-a-half hours and including 15 fours, the second innings century out of 167 in just 95 minutes, with four sixes and 14 fours. Wisden reported that he was "very severe on [Ian Johnson] and [Jack Wilson]".

Over the 1956/57 new year, McCool was one of a party of 12 cricketers, all but one of them Test players, who made a brief trip to India to play two first-class matches in celebration of the silver jubilee of the Bengal Cricket Association in a side raised by the Lancashire secretary Geoffrey Howard. McCool did not play in the first match and in the second, he replaced Jock Livingston, the team's only wicketkeeper, who had been taken ill during the first game. McCool made only 23 and 1 with the bat, but he stumped Vinoo Mankad off the bowling of Dooland, one of only two stumpings in his career as a very occasional wicketkeeper.

Back in England in 1957 he was joined at Taunton by another Australian, Bill Alley, but still finished as the leading scorer for the county with 1,678 runs in all matches, to go with 44 wickets. In the wet summer of 1958 Somerset finished third in the Championship, their highest position since 1892. McCool's contribution was 1,590 runs and 46 wickets at, for him, the low average of 23 runs each. In this season, McCool made his highest score for Somerset – 169 out of a total of 314 against Worcestershire at Stourbridge – and in the last match of the season he produced his best bowling figures of his career, taking eight second-innings Nottinghamshire wickets for 74 runs on what Wisden described as "a sporting pitch".

In contrast to 1958, the 1959 season was hot and dry and McCool's figures improved: he made 1769 runs at an average of more than 40 runs per innings and took 64 first-class wickets, more than in any other Somerset season. McCool's final season with Somerset before his retirement was 1960, and he signed off with 1,222 runs and 29 wickets.

In 138 matches across the five seasons for Somerset, McCool made 7,913 runs at an average of 33.82. He also took 219 wickets at 28.05 but in his five years with the county he was never the first-choice spin bowler: in his first two seasons, Somerset used Australian-born slow left-arm orthodox bowler John McMahon as the main spin bowler, with young off-spin bowler Brian Langford also bowling more than McCool. When McMahon left, Langford took over as the top spin bowler, and by 1960 was bowling four times the number of overs that McCool took. But McCool had also lost some of his control at this stage: "He could do beguiling things with the ball, though length and line seemed to become a decreasing consideration," says the history of Somerset cricket. He also made 146 catches, many of them at first slip, where he stood "rather deeper than usual". His influence on Somerset's recovery from the trough of the early 1950s was considerable. A later Somerset history says: "Occasionally some of the younger pros didn't relish the way he treated them. Maybe they also resented that his salary was well in excess of their own. But their respect for his competitive approach and sheer experience was undeniable."

== Playing style ==
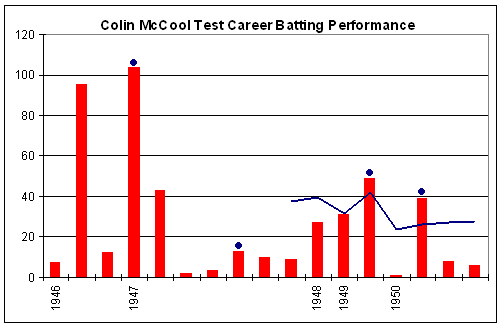
Colin McCool's Test career batting performances.

McCool had a round-arm bowling action, releasing the ball with his arm almost parallel to the ground. Before he developed problems with the skin on his spinning finger, he was, in spite of his unorthodox action, able to generate sharp spin. The cricket writer, Jack Pollard said of McCool, "[McCool] was almost unplayable on badly prepared pitches, so wide and sharp was the turn of his leg-breaks." and that he "made even State [i.e. first-class] batsmen look inept". On the advice of coaches and ex-players, McCool attempted to alter his action to a more orthodox style on several occasions but always returned to his natural style.

A short man but with a strong build, as a batsman he was a vigorous hooker and a wristy cutter, scoring mostly square of the wicket. He was particularly good against spin bowling, even on difficult pitches.

During his time at Somerset, he was known for "[turning] a match with his cracking strokes in an hour." Alan Gibson wrote: "We hardly think of him as a stylist, and he was mostly a back-foot player, getting the greater number of his runs in the segments fanning out from point and square-leg. But he was enjoyable to watch, compact, tidy, combining powerful hitting with delicate placing. In the best Somerset tradition, he was always after the bowling, and in the best Australian tradition, he always relished a fight." But he also adapted his style to suit English pitches: in an early innings for Somerset, he was out trying to hook a ball from Trevor Bailey. "The hook, he decided, was a stroke to be used sparingly on English pitches... McCool was constantly amending his technique that season [1956], whenever he spotted a flaw in his method. Again and again he held the Somerset batting together. Nothing in his previous experience had equipped him for the task of holding up a losing side in a damp English summer."

He was renowned for his catching, often spending an hour at a time practising catching a ball thrown into the side of a roller normally used to prepare the cricket pitch. Journalist and former team-mate Bill O'Reilly said after McCool's death in 1986: "If Colin had played in the last 10 years, he would have been regarded as one of the greatest all-rounders ever in Australian cricket. He was a great batsman, [...] a wonderful bowler and one of the best slips fieldsmen I have ever seen."

== Personality and personal life ==
Accounts of McCool in his Somerset period portray him as a thoughtful but slightly aloof character. "Off the field he was a quiet man," wrote David Foot. He was "a contemplative pipe-smoker in the corner of the dressing room," says another account, and somewhat intolerant of others who appeared less committed than he was. "Occasionally some of the younger pros didn't relish the way he treated them. Maybe they also resented that his salary was well in excess of their own."

Alan Gibson wrote about him more volubly: "He thought about the game a lot. Many Australian cricketers do, more than English cricketers probably, but McCool was in some ways an untypical Australian. He had a diffidence and gentleness, which do not always spring to mind as familiar Australian qualities: but he had plenty of Australian determination."

Gibson wrote that McCool "did not quite come to terms with the West Country". He went on: "He missed the sunshine. 'There's no winter,' he said, 'and the beer's better. And the f------ off-spinners don't turn.' I think an additional reason was that he found some difficulty in accepting the conventions of English cricket as it was then. There was a Somerset committee member, who liked and admired him, and would greet him with, 'Morning, McCool'. That committee member was seeking to be courteous. He would have thought it pompous to say 'Mr McCool', and impertinent to say 'Colin'. But it infuriated Colin. He thought it a reflection on his status. He would have preferred something like 'Hi, Col, you old bastard.' The worlds were too far apart."

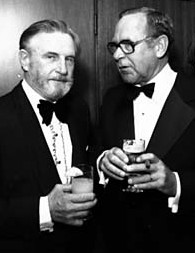
McCool (left) with Invincibles teammate Arthur Morris at a function in 1979

McCool was given a testimonial season by Somerset in 1959 after just three years with county and the circumstances were unusual enough for it to be remarked on in the county's Year Book, published in the winter before the season. "Although Colin McCool has played for the County for three seasons only, this Testimonial is a fitting reward for his valuable services as an all-rounder and off the field, where his influence is most marked."

After retirement from first-class cricket at the end of the 1960 season in England, McCool returned to Australia, taking up market gardening with a specialty in rare blooms at Umina Beach on the Central Coast of New South Wales. He continued playing club cricket in the Newcastle competition for Belmont until rheumatism forced him to retire from all forms of cricket aged 55: "Rheumatism in my right hand made it embarrassing for me to continue. It was alarming to an old pro like me who prided himself on length and directions to have the ball slip out of my fingers out of control."

McCool was the author of two books on cricket: Cricket is a Game, which was an autobiography, and The Best Way to Play Cricket, both published in 1961. John Arlott, reviewing them in Wisden 1962, said the first was "full of trenchant good sense, humour, anecdote and shrewd observation". The second book, Arlott wrote, was "to the best of this reviewer's knowledge, the first cricket book to be initially published in the modern paper-back format". It was, he added, "full of good instruction and ... sets down some genuine cricket wisdom with freshness and vitality".

He married Dorothy Everlyn Yabsley in 1943 in Sydney. His son, Russ McCool, who was born in Taunton, played one first-class match for Somerset in 1982, in addition to playing for New South Wales Colts and New South Wales Country.

== Test match performance ==
| | | Batting | | | | Bowling | | | |
| Opposition | Matches | Runs | Average | High Score | 100 / 50 | Runs | Wickets | Average | Best (Inns) |
|---|---|---|---|---|---|---|---|---|---|
| England | 5 | 272 | 54.40 | 104* | 1/1 | 491 | 18 | 27.17 | 5/44 |
| India | 3 | 46 | 15.33 | 27 | 0/0 | 199 | 4 | 49.75 | 3/71 |
| New Zealand | 1 | 7 | 7.00 | 7 | 0/0 | 0 | 1 | 0.00 | 1/0 |
| South Africa | 5 | 134 | 33.50 | 49 | 0/0 | 268 | 13 | 20.61 | 5/41 |
| Overall | 14 | 459 | 35.30 | 104* | 1/1 | 958 | 36 | 26.61 | 5/41 |
