= Mike Curtis (cricketer) =

New Zealand cricketer (1933–2009)

Personal information
- Full name: William Michael Curtis
- Born: 30 August 1933; Auckland, New Zealand
- Died: 1 December 2009 (aged 76); Wellington, New Zealand
- Batting: Right-handed
- Role: Wicket-keeper

Domestic team information
- Years: Team
- 1955/56–1958/59: Wellington

Career statistics
Competition	First-class
Matches	18
Runs scored	167
Batting average	7.26
100s/50s	0/0
Top score	27
Catches/stumpings	39/4
- Source: Cricinfo, 27 February 2020

William Michael Curtis (30 August 1933 – 1 December 2009) was a New Zealand cricketer who played first-class cricket for Wellington from 1956 to 1959.

Mike Curtis replaced Trevor McMahon as Wellington's wicket-keeper and held the position for three seasons, before McMahon returned and reclaimed his spot. Curtis represented North Island in a trial match at the end of the 1957–58 season, taking four catches in each innings and making his two highest first-class scores of 27 not out and 22, but it was not quite enough to win the match or gain him a spot in the touring side to England later that year.

Curtis spent decades involved in cricket organisation and coaching. In 1997–98 he was the joint first winner of the Bert Sutcliffe Medal, awarded by New Zealand Cricket for outstanding service to cricket in New Zealand, in recognition of his work for junior cricket in the Wellington area. In January 2009 he published a short instructional book on wicket-keeping, The Art of Wicketkeeping. He was one of 50 New Zealanders awarded the ICC Centenary Medal in April 2009 in recognition of their long-standing voluntary work for cricket. After his death in December 2009 Cricket Wellington instigated the Mike Curtis Cup for services to community cricket, awarded annually beginning with the 2009–10 season.
