= John D'Arcy (cricketer) =

New Zealand cricketer

Personal information
- Full name: John William D'Arcy
- Born: 23 April 1936 (age 90); Christchurch, New Zealand
- Batting: Right-handed

International information
- National side: New Zealand (1958)
- Test debut (cap 81): 5 June 1958 v England
- Last Test: 21 August 1958 v England

Domestic team information
- Years: Team
- 1955/56–1958/59: Canterbury
- 1959/60: Wellington
- 1960/61–1961/62: Otago

Career statistics
Competition	Test	First-class
Matches	5	53
Runs scored	136	2009
Batting average	13.59	23.09
100s/50s	0/0	0/12
Top score	33	89
Balls bowled	0	29
Wickets	–	1
Bowling average	–	12.00
5 wickets in innings	–	0
10 wickets in match	–	0
Best bowling	–	1/0
Catches/stumpings	0/–	26/–
- Source: Cricinfo, 1 April 2017

John William D'Arcy (born 23 April 1936 in Christchurch) is a former New Zealand cricketer who played five Tests on New Zealand's tour of England in 1958.

== Cricket career ==
D'Arcy attended Christchurch Boys' High School, where he opened the batting with Bruce Bolton for the first team. He continued to open the batting throughout his first-class career for Canterbury from 1955–56 to 1958–59, and for Otago from 1960–61 to 1961–62. His top score was 89, made in nearly five hours, against Glamorgan early in the 1958 tour.

In his first three seasons before the 1958 tour, D'Arcy made 810 runs at 30.00 with five fifties. Although he scored only 136 runs in the five Tests in 1958, this tally still made him New Zealand's third-highest scorer. He top-scored twice in the first two Tests, and his 33 out of a team total of 74 all out in the Second Test, in just over two hours, was the team's highest individual score until Tony MacGibbon made 39 in the second innings of the Third Test. At the end of the tour, the former England Test captain Norman Yardley said he thought D'Arcy the best of the New Zealand team's young players, saying he had "applied genuine thought to his game and adapted himself with shrewdness and intelligence".

He made 327 runs at 32.70 in the Plunket Shield in 1958-59 and played for South Island in the trial match against North Island before the Test series against England in 1958–59, but despite scoring 57 in the second innings, he was not selected in the two Tests.

D'Arcy was only 25 when his first-class career ended. Christopher Martin-Jenkins said of him, "He often defended admirably, but an absence of forcing strokes, due partly to an unorthodox grip, reduced his effectiveness." John Reid, his captain in 1958, said that while D'Arcy's "courage and patience could never be questioned", his "limited stroke equipment was ... the factor which restricted his batting to something removed from international class".

== Later life ==
D'Arcy worked as the Dunedin manager for IBM before returning to Christchurch as IBM's manager for the South Island. Later he moved to Sydney, where he spent 12 years working with IBM. He then ran his own business in Sydney, which he sold in 2000.

He wrote an autobiography, Life Wasn't Always Like This, which was published in 2024.
