= George Ayling =

English-born Indian cricket umpire

Personal information
- Born: 14 November 1919; Northfleet, Kent, England
- Died: 9 October 1964 (aged 44); Eton College, Buckinghamshire, England

Umpiring information
- Tests umpired: 1 (1956)
- Source: ESPNcricinfo, 1 July 2013

George Ayling MBE (14 November 1919 – 9 October 1964) was an English soldier and cricket umpire in India. He stood in one Test match between India and Australia in November 1956.

Born in Kent, Ayling was a regimental sergeant-major in the Grenadier Guards. He was on loan to the Government of India, stationed at the National Defence Academy in Khadakwasla, Pune, when he took up cricket umpiring. He progressed from services matches to Ranji Trophy matches in the 1954–55 season, and officiated in the Third Test of India's series against Australia in November 1956. In all, he umpired eight first-class matches in India between February 1955 and February 1957. He was appointed MBE in the 1955 Birthday Honours.

Ayling intended to retire from military service and return to England to become a professional umpire. Back in England, he took up the position of regimental sergeant-major at Eton College, but died there suddenly of illness, aged 44.
