= Russ McCool =

Australian cricketer (born 1959)

Russel McCool
Personal information
- Full name: Russel John McCool
- Born: 4 December 1959 (age 66); Taunton, Somerset, England
- Batting: Right-handed
- Bowling: Leg-break and googly

Domestic team information
- Years: Team
- 1982: Somerset

Career statistics
Competition	FC
Matches	1
Runs scored	19
Batting average	9.50
100s/50s	0/0
Top score	12
Balls bowled	102
Wickets	0
Bowling average	–
5 wickets in innings	–
10 wickets in match	–
Best bowling	0/18
Catches/stumpings	1/–
- Source: CricketArchive, 22 December 2015

Russel John McCool (born 4 December 1959 at Taunton, Somerset, England) is an Australian cricketer who, by dint of his birthplace, played one first-class match for Somerset in 1982.

McCool was the son of the Australian Test all-rounder Colin McCool and his wife Dorothy. He was born while his father was engaged as a professional cricketer for Somerset, but brought up in Australia where he attended schools in Woy Woy, New South Wales.

A leg-spin bowler and a right-handed lower order batsman, Russel McCool played for New South Wales Colts from the 1980–81 season. But his only first-class experience came in a single season, 1982, that he spent with Somerset, qualifying by birth. In his single match for the first team against Derbyshire at Derby, he made 7 and 12 batting at No 10, took one catch, but failed to take a wicket with his bowling. He played fairly regularly for Somerset's Second Eleven in the Second Eleven Championship and the Minor Counties, taking 30 wickets in the season. He suffered an injury at the end of the season and had to stop playing and return to Australia.
