= English cricket team in Pakistan in 1955–56 =

An English cricket team sponsored by Marylebone Cricket Club (MCC) visited Pakistan from December 1955 to February 1956 and played fourteen first-class matches including four against the Pakistan national cricket team.

== The team ==
- Donald Carr (captain)
- Ken Barrington
- Brian Close
- Michael Cowan
- Tony Lock
- Alan Moss
- Jim Parks
- Peter Richardson
- Peter Sainsbury
- Harold Stephenson
- Billy Sutcliffe
- Roy Swetman
- Ian Thomson
- Fred Titmus
- Maurice Tompkin
- Allan Watkins

Thomson was not in the original team. He replaced the injured Cowan midway through the tour.

== Pakistan v MCC series summary ==
- 1st match at Bagh-e-Jinnah, Lahore – match drawn
- 2nd match at Dacca Stadium, Dacca – Pakistan won by innings and 10 runs
- 3rd match at Arbab Niaz Stadium, Peshawar – Pakistan won by 7 wickets
- 4th match at National Stadium, Karachi – MCC won by 2 wickets

== Idrees Baig incident ==
On the third evening of the match against Pakistan in Peshawar, some of the English players, fed up with what they regarded as the Pakistani umpire Idrees Baig's pomposity on the field and his bias in favour of Pakistan, kidnapped him, took him back to their hotel and tipped a bucket of water over him. The incident caused outrage in Pakistan and almost led to the abandonment of the tour, but diplomacy by the MCC president, Lord Alexander, and Iskander Mirza, the president of the Board of Control for Cricket in Pakistan, smoothed things over sufficiently to allow the tour to continue.
