= Cyril Crawford =

New Zealand cricketer (1902–1988)

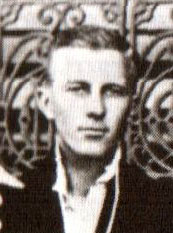

Personal information
- Full name: Cyril Gore Crawford
- Born: 13 March 1902; Christchurch, New Zealand
- Died: 17 June 1988 (aged 86); Christchurch, New Zealand
- Batting: Right-handed
- Role: Batsman
- Relatives: Bill Playle (nephew)

Domestic team information
- Years: Team
- 1920–21 to 1931–32: Canterbury

Career statistics
Competition	First-class
Matches	15
Runs scored	551
Batting average	21.19
100s/50s	0/2
Top score	70
Catches/stumpings	5/0
- Source: Cricinfo, 11 December 2014

Cyril Gore Crawford (13 March 1902 – 17 June 1988) was a New Zealand cricketer who played first-class cricket for Canterbury from 1921 to 1932 and played for New Zealand in the days before New Zealand played Test cricket.

== Career ==
Crawford was born in Christchurch and educated at Christchurch Boys' High School, where he excelled at cricket, coached by Arthur Thomas. A middle-order batsman, Crawford struggled to establish a place in the Canterbury side until he scored 61 against the touring New South Wales team in 1923–24, when he "played the soundest cricket of any one on the side" and "more than justified his inclusion". The next season, against the Victorians, he made 70 batting at number three, when he "gave a sound exhibition of batting" and "made quite a lot of fine scoring shots", particularly the cut.

He toured Australia with the New Zealand team in 1925–26, but failed in his two matches against state teams, although he scored 121 in a two-day match against a Northern Districts of New South Wales XI in the last match of the tour. He played a few more Plunket Shield matches over subsequent seasons with little success.

Crawford was a stalwart of the St Albans club in Christchurch, playing 223 matches over nearly 30 years. He was a life member of the Canterbury Cricket Association.

Crawford was a Rugby union referee who officiated in a number of inter-provincial games from the 1920s to the 1940s.
