= English cricket team in Australia in 1946–47 =

International cricket tour

The England cricket team toured Australia in the 1946–47 season to play a five-match Test series against Australia for The Ashes. The tour was organised by the Marylebone Cricket Club and matches outside the Tests were played under the MCC name. The team went on to play further matches in New Zealand, including one Test match.

Australia won the series 3–0, with two matches drawn, and therefore retained The Ashes.

== Test series summary ==
- 1st Test at Brisbane Cricket Ground – Australia won by an innings and 332 runs
- 2nd Test at Sydney Cricket Ground – Australia won by an innings and 33 runs
- 3rd Test at Melbourne Cricket Ground – match drawn
- 4th Test at Adelaide Oval – match drawn
- 5th Test at Sydney Cricket Ground – Australia won by 5 wickets

=== First Test ===
29 November–4 December 1946
(6-day match)
Scorecard

Australia	v	England
645 (158.6 overs); DG Bradman 187 (313); DVP Wright 5/167 (43.6 overs)		141 (61.5 overs); WR Hammond 32 (145); KR Miller 7/60 (22 overs)
		172 (43.7 overs) (f/o); JT Ikin 32 (56); ERH Toshack 6/82 (20.7 overs)

Australia won by an innings and 332 runs
The Gabba, Brisbane
Umpires: George Borwick (Aus) and John Scott (Aus)

- Australia won the toss and elected to bat
- 1 December was taken as a rest day
- 8 balls per over

=== Second Test ===
13–19 December 1946
(6-day match)
Scorecard

England	v	Australia
255 (96.1 overs); WJ Edrich 71 (236); IWG Johnson 6/42 (30.1 overs)		8/659d (173 overs); SG Barnes 234 (667); DG Bradman 234 (396); WJ Edrich 3/79 (26 overs)
371 (106.4 overs); WJ Edrich 119 (379); CL McCool 5/109 (32.4 overs)

Australia won by an innings and 33 runs
Sydney Cricket Ground, Sydney
Umpires: George Borwick (Aus) and John Scott (Aus)

- England won the toss and elected to bat
- 15 December was taken as a rest day
- 8 balls per over

=== Third Test ===
1–7 January 1947
(6-day match)
Scorecard

Australia	v	England
365 (97.3 overs); CL McCool 104* (174); WJ Edrich 3/50 (10.3 overs)		351 (108.5 overs); WJ Edrich 89 (237); B Dooland 4/69 (27 overs)
536 (113.3 overs); AR Morris 155 (317); NWD Yardley 3/67 (20 overs)		7/310 (100 overs); C Washbrook 112 (299); KM Miller 2/41 (11 overs)

Match drawn
Melbourne Cricket Ground, Melbourne
Umpires: George Borwick (Aus) and John Scott (Aus)

- Australia won the toss and elected to bat
- 5 January was taken as a rest day
- 8 balls per over

=== Fourth Test ===
31 January–6 February 1947
(6-day match)
Scorecard

England	v	Australia
460 (153 overs); DCS Compton 147 (350); RR Lindwall 4/52 (23 overs)		487 (118.4 overs); KM Miller 141 (198); AV Bedser 3/97 (30 overs)
8/340d (125.1 overs); DCS Compton 103* (353); ERH Toshack 4/76 (36 overs)		1/215 (44 overs); AR Morris 124* (171); NWD Yardley 1/69 (13 overs)

Match drawn
Adelaide Oval, Adelaide
Umpires: George Borwick (Aus) and John Scott (Aus)

- England won the toss and elected to bat
- 2 February was taken as a rest day
- 8 balls per over

=== Fifth Test ===
28 February–5 March 1947
(6-day match)
Scorecard

England	v	Australia
280 (94.3 overs); L Hutton 122 (356); RR Lindwall 7/63 (22 overs)		253 (76 overs); SG Barnes 71 (166); DVP Wright 7/105 (29 overs)
186 (60.4 overs); DCS Compton 76 (178); CL McCool 5/44 (21.4 overs)		5/214 (52.2 overs); DG Bradman 63 (117); AV Bedser 2/75 (22 overs)

Australia won by 5 wickets
Sydney Cricket Ground, Sydney
Umpires: George Borwick (Aus) and John Scott (Aus)

- England won the toss and elected to bat
- 2 March was taken as a rest day
- 8 balls per over

== Bibliography ==
- Harte, Chris (1993). A History of Australian Cricket. London: André Deutsch. ISBN 978-02-33988-25-2.
- Preston, Hubert, ed. (1948). Wisden Cricketers' Almanack (85th ed.). London: Sporting Handbooks Ltd. OCLC 851705816.
- Robinson, Ray (1975). On Top Down Under. Australia: Cassell. ISBN 978-07-26973-64-2.
- West, Peter, ed. (1948). Playfair Cricket Annual (1st ed.). London: Playfair Books Ltd. OCLC 21890859.
