= Chandrakant Patankar =

Indian cricketer (born 1930)

Personal information
- Full name: Chandrakant Trimbak Patankar
- Born: 24 November 1930 (age 95); Pen, British India (now in Maharashtra, India)
- Height: 5 ft 9 in (1.75 m)
- Batting: Right-handed
- Role: Wicket-keeper

International information
- National side: India
- Only Test (cap 82): 28 December 1955 v New Zealand

Domestic team information
- Years: Team
- 1949–50 to 1965–66: Bombay
- 1966–67: Maharashtra

Career statistics
Competition	Tests	First-class
Matches	1	26
Runs scored	14	503
Batting average	14.00	15.71
100s/50s	0/0	1/0
Top score	13	100
Catches/stumpings	3/1	38/20
- Source: ESPNcricinfo, 20 October 2021

Chandrakant Trimbak Patankar (born 24 November 1930) is an Indian former cricketer who played in one Test match in 1955. His first-class cricket career extended from 1949–50 to 1967–68.

== Life and career ==
Born in Pen in the Raigad district of Maharashtra, Patankar attended Bombay University, gaining an MSc. He played first-class cricket for Bombay from 1950 to 1966, then had a season for Maharashtra in 1966–67.

A wicket-keeper and lower-order right-handed batsman, Patankar replaced his Bombay wicketkeeping colleague Naren Tamhane, who was injured, for the fourth game of the five-match Test series against New Zealand in 1955–56, but lost his place when Tamhane replaced him for the final game of the series. He played in Bombay's Ranji Trophy-winning teams in 1960–61 and 1965–66, but never played an uninterrupted season, Tamhane being the senior Bombay wicket-keeper for most of that period. In the Ranji Trophy semi-final against Madras in 1953–54 he made five stumpings in Bombay's 379-run victory, then lost his place to Tamhane for the final. He usually batted in the tail without making many runs, but when he opened the batting for the Maharana of Mewar's XI against the Associated Cement Company in the 1964–65 Moin-ud-Dowlah Gold Cup Tournament he not only scored his only first-class fifty but went on to score 100.

Patankar worked for the Indian companies BEST, Killick Indus and Laxmi Vishnu. With the death of C. D. Gopinath in April 2026, Patankar became India's oldest living Test cricketer.
