= Leam, Derbyshire =

Coordinates: 53.309°N 1.651°W

Leam
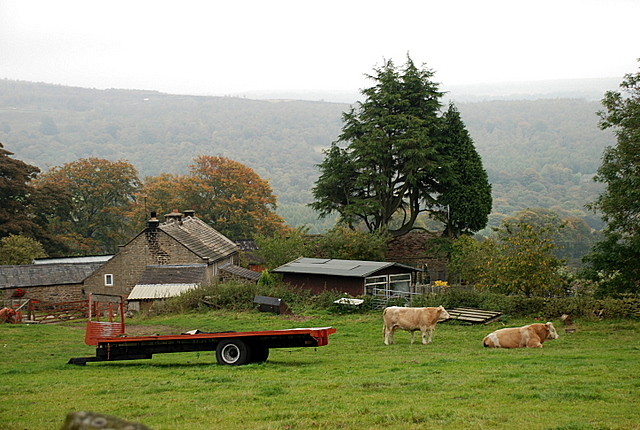
- Leam Farm.

- Location within Derbyshire
- OS grid reference: SK233791
- District: Derbyshire Dales
- Shire county: Derbyshire
- Region: East Midlands
- Country: England
- Sovereign state: United Kingdom
- Post town: HOPE VALLEY
- Postcode district: S32
- Dialling code: 01433
- Police: Derbyshire
- Fire: Derbyshire
- Ambulance: East Midlands
- UK Parliament: Derbyshire Dales

Leam, or historically Leam Farm, is a hamlet in the English county of Derbyshire. There are a number of buildings, which once formed a single estate. Leam is due south of Hathersage, close to Grindleford.

== History ==
The Middleton family historically resided at Leam Hall, with Marmaduke Middleton's gravestone at St Lawrence's Church, Eyam stating that he died at Leam on February 6, 1845.

== Notable people ==
- Sir Henry Cooper, New Zealand educator.
