= Dinkar Desai =

Indian cricket umpire (1916–1985)

Personal information
- Full name: Dinkarrai Dhirajlal Desai
- Born: 21 October 1916
- Died: 26 December 1985 (aged 69)
- Role: Umpire

Umpiring information
- Tests umpired: 3 (1955–1956)
- Source: ESPNcricinfo, 6 June 2019

Dinkar Desai (21 October 1916 – 26 December 1985) was an Indian cricket umpire. He stood in three Test matches between 1955 and 1956.

== See also ==
- List of Test cricket umpires
- New Zealand cricket team in India in 1955–56
- Australian cricket team in India in 1956–57
