= Michael Cowan (cricketer) =

English cricketer (1933–2022)

Personal information
- Full name: Michael Joseph Cowan
- Born: 10 June 1933; Leeds, Yorkshire, England
- Died: 12 July 2022 (aged 89); Doncaster, Yorkshire, England
- Batting: Right-handed
- Bowling: Left-arm fast-medium

Domestic team information
- Years: Team
- 1953–1962: Yorkshire

Career statistics
Competition	First-class
Matches	99
Runs scored	233
Batting average	5.54
100s/50s	0/0
Top score	22
Balls bowled	15,963
Wickets	276
Bowling average	24.57
5 wickets in innings	13
10 wickets in match	2
Best bowling	9/43
Catches/stumpings	40/–
- Source: Cricinfo, 31 March 2017

Michael Joseph Cowan (10 June 1933 – 12 July 2022) was an English first-class cricketer who played for Yorkshire County Cricket Club.

A left-arm fast-medium bowler and right-handed batsman, Cowan took 276 wickets at an average of 24.57, with a best of nine wickets for 43 against Warwickshire in 1960. In batting he scored only 233 runs in 94 innings, at an average of 5.54, with a highest score of 22.

He toured Pakistan with MCC "A" in 1955–56. A back injury caused his early return home, and curtailed his season in 1956.

In 1958 and 1959, he was the professional at Bingley C.C. In 1960, he returned to the Yorkshire side to take 77 wickets, but then faded from the scene.

In the early 1980s he was a representative for Penguin Books, visiting booksellers in Yorkshire and elsewhere to promote the forthcoming list and backlist.
