= Eric Petrie =

New Zealand cricketer

- Petrie pictured in 1959

Personal information
- Full name: Eric Charlton Petrie
- Born: 22 May 1927; Ngāruawāhia, New Zealand
- Died: 14 August 2004 (aged 77); Ōmokoroa, New Zealand
- Batting: Right-handed
- Bowling: Legbreak
- Role: Wicket-keeper

International information
- National side: New Zealand (1955–1966)
- Test debut (cap 75): 26 October 1955 v Pakistan
- Last Test: 11 March 1966 v England

Career statistics
Competition	Test	First-class
Matches	14	115
Runs scored	258	2788
Batting average	12.90	17.98
100s/50s	0/1	2/6
Top score	55	151
Catches/stumpings	25/–	198/37
- Source: Cricinfo, 1 April 2017

Eric Charlton Petrie (22 May 1927 – 14 August 2004) was a New Zealand cricketer who played 14 Test matches for New Zealand from 1955 to 1966 as a wicket-keeper.

== Domestic career ==
Petrie began playing for Waikato in the Hawke Cup in 1945–46. He made his first-class debut for Auckland in 1950–51.

He established himself in the Auckland team in 1952–53, and captained the team in 1954–55. When the Northern Districts men's cricket team made its first-class debut in 1956-57 he was appointed captain, a position he held until the end of the 1960–61 season. He scored two first-class centuries, both against Wellington: the first in 1953-54 when he opened the Auckland second innings and made 151, the other in 1959-60 when he made 136 at number five for Northern Districts.

He retired from first-class cricket after the 1966–67 season.

== International career ==
Petrie was selected to tour Pakistan and India with the New Zealanders in 1955–56. He played in four of the eight Tests on the tour.

He toured England in 1958, playing all five Tests. He was also selected for the Gentlemen in the Gentlemen v Players match at the end of the season. Wisden noted that he was "a neat and reliable wicket-keeper, who ... was immensely popular because of his pleasant personality".

He played both Tests when England toured in 1958-59, and after a gap he returned for all three Tests when England toured in 1965-66. His top score in Tests was 55 against England in the First Test in 1965–66.
