= Jack Wilson (Australian cricketer) =

Australian cricketer

Personal information
- Full name: John William Wilson
- Born: 20 August 1921; Albert Park, Melbourne, Victoria, Australia
- Died: 13 October 1985 (aged 64); Bayswater, Melbourne, Victoria
- Nickname: Chucker
- Batting: Right-handed
- Bowling: Slow left-arm orthodox
- Role: Bowler

International information
- National side: Australia
- Only Test (cap 205): 26 October 1956 v India

Domestic team information
- Years: Team
- 1949/50: Victoria
- 1950/51–1957/58: South Australia

Career statistics
Competition	Tests	First-class
Matches	1	78
Runs scored	–	287
Batting average	–	5.74
100s/50s	–	0/0
Top score	–	19*
Balls bowled	216	19,853
Wickets	1	230
Bowling average	64.00	30.51
5 wickets in innings	0	9
10 wickets in match	0	1
Best bowling	1/25	7/11
Catches/stumpings	0/–	17/–
- Source: CricInfo, 20 April 2019

John William Wilson (20 August 1921 – 13 October 1985) was an Australian cricketer who played in one Test match in 1956.

== Life and career ==
A left-arm spinner from Victoria who delivered the ball at almost medium pace, Wilson was nicknamed "Chuck" or "Chucker" because of the jerkiness of his action, a legacy of a football injury when he was a teenager. However, his action was never officially questioned.

He played once for his home state before moving to South Australia in 1950/51, playing virtually every first-class match for the state side until 1956/57. He had abundant stamina and relied on flight and accuracy more than spin.

He toured England with Australia in 1956, but Wisden commented that he "never adapted himself to English conditions" and "lacked finger-spin". He took 43 wickets on the English leg of the tour but did not play in any of the Test matches. His one successful match on the tour came at Bristol, where he took 12 Gloucestershire wickets for 61 runs in the match, at one point taking six wickets in seven overs for no runs as the county were all out for just 44 in their first innings. His seven for 11 in that innings remained his best bowling performance.

On the way home from England, the Australians played one Test match in Pakistan and three in India. Wilson was picked for the second match against India at Bombay, did not bat and took only one wicket. The match was drawn. Ian Johnson, returning after injury, replaced him for the third Test, played on a spinners' wicket at Calcutta, which Australia won.

An indifferent batsman who usually batted at No. 11, Wilson had a highest first-class score of 19 not out. On the 1956 tour of England, he scored just 23 runs all summer.
