= Trevor Meale =

New Zealand cricketer

- Trevor Meale in 1958

Personal information
- Born: 11 November 1928; Papatoetoe, Auckland, New Zealand
- Died: 21 May 2010 (aged 81); Orewa, Auckland, New Zealand
- Batting: Left-handed
- Bowling: Right-arm medium

International information
- National side: New Zealand (1958)
- Test debut (cap 82): 5 June 1958 v England
- Last Test: 21 August 1958 v England

Career statistics
Competition	Test	First-class
Matches	2	32
Runs scored	21	1,352
Batting average	5.25	27.59
100s/50s	0/0	2/5
Top score	10	130
Catches/stumpings	0/–	17/–
- Source: Cricinfo, 1 April 2017

Trevor Meale (11 November 1928 – 21 May 2010) was a New Zealand cricketer who played in two Test matches in 1958. Meale was born in Papatoetoe, Auckland and died in Orewa, Auckland.

== Cricket career ==
A left-handed opening batsman, Meale played several times for Wellington in Plunket Shield matches in the early 1950s, but his only centuries came in matches against touring teams. Against the West Indian cricket team in his debut season of 1951–52, his unbeaten 112 saved the match for Wellington, while his 130 against Fiji in 1953–54 was his last first-class innings for almost four years, and remained his highest score. He then moved to England to try to get into first-class cricket there, but was not successful.

Meale re-emerged in New Zealand in the trial games from which the 1958 New Zealand team to England was picked, scored 48, and was duly selected for the trip. But on a disastrous tour for New Zealand in a very wet English summer, he was not a success: he scored just over 500 runs and averaged only 21 runs per innings. A hard-hitting 89 against Worcestershire and an undefeated 64 against Somerset led to his selection for the First Test: batting at number six, he scored 7 in the first innings and 10 in the second, with a four and a six. He was dropped for the next three Tests, but reappeared in the rain-ruined final Test at The Oval, where he scored just 1 and 3. After the tour he retired from first-class cricket.

Meale played several matches for Hutt Valley in the Hawke Cup between 1952–53 and 1958–59.
