= Lawrie Miller =

New Zealand cricketer

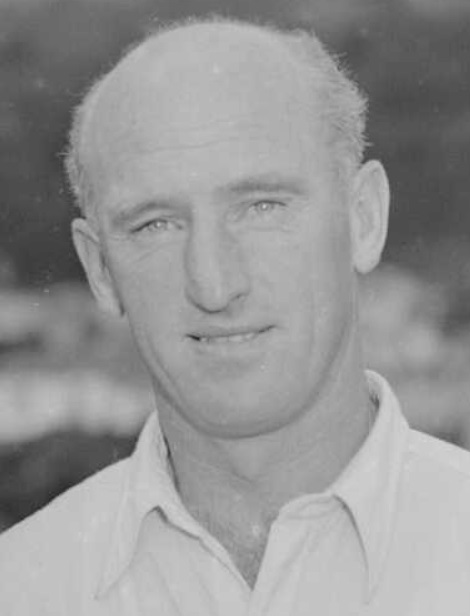
- Miller in 1955

Personal information
- Born: 31 March 1923; New Plymouth, Taranaki, New Zealand
- Died: 17 December 1996 (aged 73); Wellington, New Zealand
- Batting: Left-handed
- Bowling: Left-arm slow-medium

International information
- National side: New Zealand (1953–1958)
- Test debut (cap 60): 6 March 1953 v South Africa
- Last Test: 21 August 1958 v England

Domestic team information
- Years: Team
- 1950/51–1952/53: Central Districts
- 1954/55–1959/60: Wellington

Career statistics
Competition	Test	First-class
Matches	13	82
Runs scored	346	4,777
Batting average	13.83	37.61
100s/50s	0/0	5/34
Top score	47	144
Balls bowled	2	144
Wickets	0	3
Bowling average	–	25.00
5 wickets in innings	–	0
10 wickets in match	–	0
Best bowling	–	1/7
Catches/stumpings	1/–	33/–
- Source: Cricinfo, 1 April 2017

Lawrence Somerville Martin Miller (31 March 1923 – 17 December 1996) was a cricketer who played 13 Test matches for New Zealand between 1953 and 1958, and played Plunket Shield cricket for Central Districts and Wellington.

== Cricket career ==
A tall left-handed batsman, Miller was a late developer who made his first class debut at 27 when Central Districts entered the Plunket Shield for the 1950–51 season. Batting in the middle order he top-scored in the first match with 46, and again in the second match with 64, when Central Districts had their first victory. He did not play in 1951–52, but returned in force in 1952–53: 103 not out against Wellington, 128 not out and 89 not out against Canterbury, 77 and 31 against Otago, and 43 against Auckland, amassing 471 runs at 157.00.

He played in the two Tests later that season against South Africa, making 17, 13 and 44, and was selected to tour South Africa in 1953–54. He failed there though, making only 47 runs in four Tests including four successive ducks. In the Second Test at Johannesburg he was felled by a sharply rising ball from Neil Adcock that struck him over the heart, and was taken to hospital. Although he was not expected to bat again in the innings, he returned to the crease straight from hospital at the fall of the fifth wicket and resisted the bowling for another half-hour. After the tour he found belated form in Australia on the way home, scoring 142 against South Australia and 60 against Victoria.

Miller's highest Test score was 47 (followed by 25 in the second innings) when he opened the batting in a low-scoring game against West Indies at Auckland in 1955–56, and New Zealand finally won a Test match after 26 years of trying. He had hit his highest first-class score earlier that season, 144 against Auckland, as well as scoring 114 for Wellington against the West Indians, having begun playing for Wellington the previous season.

Although he played 13 Tests over five years, Miller made little impact, never passing 50 in an innings, and averaging less than 14 runs per innings. His Test career ended after the damp series in England in 1958, when he completed 1148 runs in first-class matches but again failed in the Tests. Wisden said that "at the age of 35, [he] came too late on his first tour of England ... he knew how to punish the loose ball, but he was not happy against bowling of the highest class."

Miller was one of the leading batsmen in the Plunket Shield in the 1950s: he scored 661 runs at an average of 66.10 for Central Districts, and 1708 runs at 47.44 for Wellington. He won the Redpath Cup for New Zealand batsman of the season in 1952–53, 1956–57 and 1957–58.
