= New Zealand cricket team in England in 1958 =

International cricket tour

The New Zealand cricket team toured England in the 1958 season. In a notably wet summer when the touring side lost the equivalent of 29 full days of cricket, the side lost four of the five Test matches (and would probably have lost the other had rain not ruined the match). In first-class matches, they won six of their first nine games, but then won only one more all season, although they only lost two matches outside the Tests, both of them to Surrey.

== The background ==
New Zealand's first tour of England for nine years saw what was probably the weakest of the Test-playing nations taking on the side that could probably claim to be the strongest. In home series England had successively beaten Australia and the West Indies, and a combination of fast bowling from Brian Statham, Fred Trueman and others, spin bowling from Jim Laker and Tony Lock, and apparently reliable batting led by captain Peter May, Colin Cowdrey and Tom Graveney had made them a formidable side.

By contrast, New Zealand had undoubted batting class in Bert Sutcliffe, a determined captain in all-rounder John Reid, and some relatively unknown and untried players alongside a few reliable stalwarts who had played across the 1950s. The preceding years had seen New Zealand finally achieve its first-ever Test victory, and previous New Zealand sides in England had often raised their game in the big matches (though even Tests in the previous tours had been restricted to just three or four days).

== The New Zealand touring team ==
The side was captained by John Reid who, with Bert Sutcliffe, Harry Cave and John Hayes, were the four players who remained from the successful 1949 New Zealand team. Jack Phillipps was also returning for a second visit to England as tour manager.

The full side was:

- John Reid (captain)
- Bert Sutcliffe (vice-captain)
- Jack Alabaster
- Bob Blair
- Harry Cave
- John D'Arcy
- Noel Harford
- John Hayes
- Tony MacGibbon
- Trevor Meale
- Lawrie Miller
- Alex Moir
- Eric Petrie (wicketkeeper)
- Bill Playle
- John Sparling
- John Ward (wicketkeeper)

Of the 16 players, 11 had previously played Test cricket: the five newcomers were D'Arcy, Meale, Playle, Sparling and Ward, and of these five, all except Ward played in the Tests during this tour.

== The tour ==
The New Zealand top order was poor, D'Arcy, Playle, Harford and Miller scoring only 325 runs between them in the Tests at an average of 9.28; of the four only Playle played Test cricket again. In the Second Test at Lord's, despite scoring only 269 in the first innings, England won by an innings and 148 runs. In the Third Test at Leeds, England declared its first innings at 267 for 2, and won by an innings and 71 runs. The English spinner Tony Lock finished the series with 34 wickets at an average of 7.47.

The all-rounder Tony MacGibbon was New Zealand's highest scorer in the series, but he scored only 175 runs at an average of 19.44; he was also the highest wicket-taker with 20 at 19.45, nobody else taking more than six. In the first three Tests, the highest individual New Zealand innings was 39, by MacGibbon, with D'Arcy's 33 the only other score above 26. In the last two Tests, MacGibbon, Sparling and Reid each hit a fifty.

Outside the Tests, Reid hit three first-class centuries, 1282 runs and averaged 47.48, as well as bowling and catching effectively. Wisden chose him as one of its Cricketers of the Year, noting among other things that he "led the side cheerfully".

== Test series summary ==
=== First Test ===
5–9 June 1958
(5-day match)
Scorecard

England	v	New Zealand
221 (75.5 overs); PBH May 84; AR MacGibbon 5/64 (27 overs)		94 (69.3 overs); JW D'Arcy 19; FS Trueman 5/31 (21 overs)
215/6d (96.2 overs); PE Richardson 100; AR MacGibbon 3/41 (24 overs)		137 (77.3 overs); AR MacGibbon 26; GAR Lock 3/25 (8.3 overs)

England won by 205 runs
Edgbaston, Birmingham
Umpires: JS Buller and CS Elliott

- England won the toss and elected to bat.
- 8 June was taken as a rest day.
- The match was scheduled for five days but completed in four.
- MJK Smith (ENG), and JW D'Arcy, T Meale and WR Playle (all NZ) made their Test debuts.

=== Second Test ===
19–21 June 1958
(5-day match)
Scorecard

England	v	New Zealand
269 (123.4 overs); MC Cowdrey 65; JA Hayes 4/36 (22 overs)		47 (32.3 overs); B Sutcliffe 18; GAR Lock 5/17 (11.3 overs)
		74 (f/o) (50.3 overs); JW D'Arcy 33; GAR Lock 4/12 (12.3 overs)

England won by an innings and 148 runs
Lord's, London
Umpires: D Davies and CS Elliott

- England won the toss and elected to bat.
- The match was scheduled for five days but completed in three.

=== Third Test ===
3–8 July 1958
(5-day match)
Scorecard

New Zealand	v	England
67 (59.1 overs); LSM Miller 26; JC Laker 5/17 (22 overs)		267/2d (102 overs); PBH May 113*; AR MacGibbon 1/47 (27 overs)
129 (101.2 overs); AR MacGibbon 39; GAR Lock 7/51 (35.2 overs)

England won by an innings and 71 runs
Headingley, Leeds
Umpires: JS Buller and FS Lee

- New Zealand won the toss and elected to bat.
- 6 July was taken as a rest day.
- There was no play on the first or second days.
- CA Milton (ENG) and JT Sparling (NZ) made their Test debuts.

=== Fourth Test ===
24–29 July 1958
(5-day match)
Scorecard

New Zealand	v	England
267 (128.5 overs); AR MacGibbon 66; JB Statham 4/71 (33 overs)		365/9d (129.3 overs); PBH May 101; JR Reid 3/47 (11.3 overs)
85 (52 overs); B Sutcliffe 28; GAR Lock 7/35 (24 overs)

England won by an innings and 13 runs
Old Trafford, Manchester
Umpires: DE Davies and WE Phillipson

- New Zealand won the toss and elected to bat.
- 27 July was taken as a rest day.
- ER Dexter, R Illingworth and R Subba Row (all ENG) made their Test debuts.

=== Fifth Test ===
21–26 August 1958
(5-day match)
Scorecard

New Zealand	v	England
161 (75 overs); AM Moir 41*; GAR Lock 2/19 (13 overs)		219/9d (68.5 overs); FS Trueman 39*; AR MacGibbon 4/65 (27 overs)
91/3 (55 overs); JR Reid 51*; GAR Lock 1/20 (18 overs)

Match drawn
The Oval, London
Umpires: DE Davies and FS Lee

- New Zealand won the toss and elected to bat.
- 24 August was taken as a rest day.
- Only three overs (all maidens) were bowled on the second day.
- There was no play on the third or fourth days.
- The number 10 batsman was top scorer in both first innings.

== Annual reviews ==
- Playfair Cricket Annual 1959.
- Wisden Cricketers' Almanack 1959.
