= Clyde Harris =

New Zealand cricket umpire

Personal information
- Full name: James Clyde Harris
- Born: 24 November 1905; Onehunga, New Zealand
- Died: 2 June 1981 (aged 75); Onehunga, New Zealand

Umpiring information
- Tests umpired: 4 (1952–1956)
- Source: Cricinfo, 7 July 2013

Clyde Harris (24 November 1905 – 2 June 1981) was a New Zealand cricket umpire. He stood in four Test matches between 1952 and 1956. In all, he umpired 23 first-class matches between 1944 and 1958, all of them at Eden Park, Auckland.

Harris married Ella Joyce Wigmore in Auckland in January 1931. He worked as a schoolteacher.

== See also ==
- List of Test cricket umpires
