= Narain Swamy =

Indian cricketer

Personal information
- Full name: Venkatraman Narayan Swamy
- Born: 23 May 1924; Kozhikode, British India (now in Kerala, India)
- Died: 1 May 1983 (aged 58); Dehra Dun, India
- Batting: Right-handed
- Bowling: Right-arm fast-medium

International information
- National side: India
- Only Test (cap 76): 19 November 1955 v New Zealand

Career statistics
Competition	Tests	First-class
Matches	1	19
Runs scored	–	201
Batting average	–	14.35
100s/50s	–	0/1
Top score	–	53
Balls bowled	108	2936
Wickets	0	68
Bowling average	–	22.16
5 wickets in innings	–	4
10 wickets in match	–	0
Best bowling	–	6/29
Catches/stumpings	0/–	8/–

Venkatraman Narayan Swamy (23 May 1924 in near Kozhikode, Kerala – 1 May 1983 in Dehra Dun, India) was an Indian Test cricketer.

Swamy made his Test debut against New Zealand in 1955/56 and played in the first match of the series. He opened the bowling with Dattu Phadkar, took no wickets, did not bat, and was dropped. India tried out different opening bowling pairs in every match of that series.

Swamy started his first-class career with five wickets in an innings in each of his first two matches. He played for Services in the Ranji Trophy from 1951/52 to 1958/59 and took 58 wickets at an average of 19.98.

Swamy did his studies in Madras. He joined the army in 1944 and retired as a major. After his retirement he was on the staff of the Regiment of Artillery association in the Nasik road camp. He was first Kerala-born cricketer to play Tests.
