= Bill Playle =

New Zealand cricketer (1938–2019)

Personal information
- Full name: William Rodger Playle
- Born: 1 December 1938; Palmerston North, New Zealand
- Died: 27 February 2019 (aged 80); Coffs Harbour, New South Wales, Australia
- Nickname: Buckets
- Batting: Right-handed
- Bowling: Right-arm off-break
- Role: Batsman
- Relatives: Cyril Crawford (uncle)

International information
- National side: New Zealand (1958–1963)
- Test debut: 5 June 1958 v England
- Last Test: 15 March 1963 v England

Career statistics
Competition	Test	First-class
Matches	8	85
Runs scored	151	2,888
Batting average	10.06	21.87
100s/50s	0/1	4/9
Top score	65	122
Balls bowled	–	118
Wickets	–	1
Bowling average	–	94.00
5 wickets in innings	–	0
10 wickets in match	–	0
Best bowling	–	1/11
Catches/stumpings	4/–	81/–
- Source: Cricinfo, 4 March 2019

William Rodger Playle (1 December 1938 – 27 February 2019) was a New Zealand cricketer who played eight Test matches for the national team between 1958 and 1963, making 151 runs as a specialist batsman.

== Cricket career ==
=== In New Zealand ===
Bill Playle's first-class career started with Auckland in 1956–57 at the age of 18. After scoring only 355 runs in 13 matches in two seasons he was selected to tour England in 1958 as a 19-year-old, but he made only 56 runs in the five Tests, batting in the middle order. In the second innings of the Third Test at Leeds, in an attempt to avert defeat, he "gave a remarkable stonewalling display, for he stayed three and a quarter hours for 18, during which time he limited himself to seven scoring strokes".

He was the top scorer in the 1961–62 season with 510 runs at 72.85, including 116 not out against Otago. His last three Tests were as an opener against England in 1962–63, when he made his only Test score above 25, scoring 65 in 202 minutes in a lost cause in the Second Test at Wellington.

=== In Australia ===
After the 1963–64 season in New Zealand he moved to Australia, where he played as an opening batsman for Western Australia from 1965–66 to 1967–68, making his highest first-class score of 122 against Queensland and 116 against Victoria, both in 1965–66, when he made 583 runs at 41.64 in the Sheffield Shield.

== Death ==
Playle died in Coffs Harbour, New South Wales, on 27 February 2019.
