= Sadashiv Patil =

Indian cricketer (1933–2020)

Personal information
- Full name: Sadashiv Raoji Patil
- Born: 10 October 1933; Kolhapur, British India
- Died: 15 September 2020 (aged 86); Kolhapur, Maharashtra, India
- Batting: Right-handed
- Bowling: Right-arm fast-medium

International information
- National side: India
- Only Test (cap 79): 2 December 1955 v New Zealand

Career statistics
Competition	Test	First-class
Matches	1	36
Runs scored	14	866
Batting average	–	27.06
100s/50s	0/0	0/3
Top score	14*	69
Balls bowled	138	5,753
Wickets	2	83
Bowling average	25.50	30.60
5 wickets in innings	0	3
10 wickets in match	0	0
Best bowling	1/15	5/38
Catches/stumpings	1/–	20/–
- Source: Cricinfo, 15 September 2020

Sadashiv Raoji Patil (10 October 1933 – 15 September 2020) was an Indian cricketer who played in one Test in 1955. He also played 36 First-class matches for Maharashtra.
