= History of cricket in India from 1945–46 to 1960 =

This article describes the history of cricket in India from the 1945–46 season until 1960.

== Events ==
The major and defining event in the history of Indian cricket during this period was the Partition of India following full independence from the British Raj in 1947.

An early casualty of change was the Bombay Quadrangular tournament which had been a focal point of Indian cricket for over 50 years. The new India had no place for teams based on ethnic origin. As a result, the Ranji Trophy came into its own as the national championship.

The last-ever Bombay Pentangular, as it had become, was won by the Hindus in 1945–46.

== Domestic cricket ==
=== Ranji Trophy winners ===
- 1945-46 – Holkar
- 1946-47 – Baroda
- 1947-48 – Holkar
- 1948-49 – Bombay
- 1949-50 – Baroda
- 1950-51 – Holkar
- 1951-52 – Bombay
- 1952-53 – Holkar
- 1953-54 – Bombay
- 1954-55 – Madras
- 1955-56 – Bombay
- 1956-57 – Bombay
- 1957-58 – Baroda
- 1958-59 – Bombay
- 1959-60 – Bombay

== Leading players by season ==
The lists below give the leading first-class runscorers and wicket-takers in each domestic season.

=== Batsmen ===
- 1945-46 –

=== Bowlers ===
- 1945-46 –

== International tours of India ==
=== Australian Services 1945-46 ===
For information about this tour, see : Australian Services cricket team in Ceylon and India in 1945-46

=== West Indies 1948-49 ===
- 1st Test at Feroz Shah Kotla, Delhi – match drawn
- 2nd Test at Brabourne Stadium, Bombay – match drawn
- 3rd Test at Eden Gardens, Calcutta – match drawn
- 4th Test at MA Chidambaram Stadium, Chepauk, Madras – West Indies won by an innings and 193 runs
- 5th Test at Brabourne Stadium, Bombay – match drawn

=== England 1951-52 ===
- 1st Test at Feroz Shah Kotla, Delhi – match drawn
- 2nd Test at Brabourne Stadium, Bombay – match drawn
- 3rd Test at Eden Gardens, Calcutta – match drawn
- 4th Test at Modi Stadium, Kanpur – England won by 8 wickets
- 5th Test at MA Chidambaram Stadium, Chepauk, Madras – India won by an innings and 8 runs

=== Pakistan 1952-53 ===
- 1st Test at Feroz Shah Kotla, Delhi – India won by an innings and 70 runs
- 2nd Test at University Ground, Lucknow – Pakistan won by an innings and 43 runs
- 3rd Test at Brabourne Stadium, Bombay – India won by 10 wickets
- 4th Test at MA Chidambaram Stadium, Chepauk, Madras – match drawn
- 5th Test at Eden Gardens, Calcutta – match drawn

=== New Zealand 1955-56 ===
- 1st Test at Lal Bahadur Shastri Stadium, Hyderabad – match drawn
- 2nd Test at Brabourne Stadium, Bombay – India won by an innings and 27 runs
- 3rd Test at Feroz Shah Kotla, Delhi – match drawn
- 4th Test at Eden Gardens, Calcutta – match drawn
- 5th Test at Nehru Stadium, Madras – India won by an innings and 109 runs

=== Australia 1956-57 ===
- 1st Test at Nehru Stadium, Madras – Australia won by an innings and 5 runs
- 2nd Test at Brabourne Stadium, Bombay – match drawn
- 3rd Test at Eden Gardens, Calcutta – Australia won by 94 runs

=== West Indies 1958-59 ===
- 1st Test at Brabourne Stadium, Bombay – match drawn
- 2nd Test at Modi Stadium, Kanpur – West Indies won by 203 runs
- 3rd Test at Eden Gardens, Calcutta – West Indies won by an innings and 336 runs
- 4th Test at Nehru Stadium, Madras – West Indies won by 295 runs
- 5th Test at Feroz Shah Kotla, Delhi – match drawn

=== Australia 1959-60 ===
- 1st Test at Feroz Shah Kotla, Delhi – Australia won by an innings and 127 runs
- 2nd Test at Modi Stadium, Kanpur – India won by 119 runs
- 3rd Test at Brabourne Stadium, Bombay – match drawn
- 4th Test at Nehru Stadium, Madras – Australia won by an innings and 55 runs
- 5th Test at Eden Gardens, Calcutta – match drawn

== External sources ==
- CricketArchive – Itinerary of Events in India
