= Australian cricket team in India in 1956–57 =

International cricket tour

Australia cricket team in India in 1956–57
	Australia	India
- Dates: 19 October – 6 November 1956
Captains	Ian Johnson	Polly Umrigar

Test series
- Result: Australia won the 3-match series 2–0
Most runs	Neil Harvey (253)	Vijay Manjrekar (197)
Most wickets	Richie Benaud (23)	Ghulam Ahmed (12)

The Australia national cricket team toured India in the 1956–57 season. Three Test matches were played, Australia winning the series 2–0 with one match drawn.

== Test matches ==
=== 1st Test ===
19–23 October 1956
scorecard

India	v	Australia
161 (99.3 overs); Vijay Manjrekar 41; Richie Benaud 7/72 (29.3 overs)		319 (134.3 overs); Ian Johnson 73; Vinoo Mankad 4/90 (45 overs)
153 (63.5 overs); Gulabrai Ramchand 28; Ray Lindwall 7/43 (22.5 overs)

Australia won by an innings and 5 runs
Nehru Stadium, Madras
Umpires: Dinkar Desai (Ind) and Mysore Vijayasarathi (Ind)

- India won the toss and decided to bat

=== 2nd Test ===
26–31 October 1956
scorecard

India	v	Australia
251 (100.2 overs); Gulabrai Ramchand 109; Ken Mackay 3/27 (14.2 overs)		523/7 d. (180 overs); Jim Burke 161; Subhash Gupte 3/115 (38 overs)
250/5 (137 overs); Pankaj Roy 79; Richie Benaud 2/98 (42 overs)

Match drawn
Brabourne Stadium, Bombay
Umpires: Bapu Joshi (Ind) and Balkrishna Mohoni (Ind)

- India won the toss and decided to bat
- John Rutherford and Jack Wilson (Aus) made their Test debuts.

=== 3rd Test ===
2–6 November 1956
scorecard

Australia	v	India
177 (86.3 overs); Peter Burge 58; Ghulam Ahmed 7/49 (20.3 overs)		136 (78.2 overs); Vijay Manjrekar 33; Richie Benaud 6/52 (29 overs)
189/9 d. (67.4 overs); Neil Harvey 69; Vinoo Mankad 4/49 (9.4 overs)		136 (69.2 overs); Polly Umrigar 28; Richie Benaud 5/53 (24.2 overs)

Australia won by 94 runs
Eden Gardens, Calcutta
Umpires: George Ayling (Ind) and Balkrishna Mohoni (Ind)

- India won the toss and decided to field
