= Jock McLellan =

New Zealand cricket umpire

Personal information
- Full name: John McCall McLellan
- Born: 16 June 1908
- Died: 29 June 1974 (aged 66); Wellington, New Zealand

Umpiring information
- Tests umpired: 3 (1951–1955)
- Source: Cricinfo, 12 July 2013

Jock McLellan (16 June 1908 – 29 June 1974) was a New Zealand cricket umpire. He stood in three Test matches between 1951 and 1955. In all, he umpired 15 first-class matches between 1948 and 1956, all but two of them at the Basin Reserve, Wellington.

== See also ==
- List of Test cricket umpires
