= Stanley Tomkinson =

New Zealand cricket umpire

Personal information
- Full name: Stanley Brabyn Tomkinson
- Born: 5 June 1907; Dunedin, New Zealand
- Died: 12 August 1969 (aged 62); Dunedin, New Zealand

Umpiring information
- Tests umpired: 2 (1951–1955)
- Source: Cricinfo, 16 July 2013

Stanley Tomkinson (5 June 1907 – 12 August 1969) was a New Zealand cricket umpire. He stood in two Test matches, one in 1951 and the other in 1955.

Tomkinson was a prominent player as a batsman for the Grange club in Dunedin senior cricket before he took up umpiring. In all, he umpired 18 first-class matches between January 1948 and January 1957. All but one, the Test match in Christchurch in 1951, were played at Carisbrook, Dunedin. In the Christchurch Test, Tomkinson gave the English batsman Cyril Washbrook out leg before wicket, but reversed his decision a moment later after the New Zealand captain, Walter Hadlee, told him the ball had touched Washbrook's bat before hitting his pads.

== See also ==
- List of Test cricket umpires
