= Bruce Dooland =

Australian cricketer

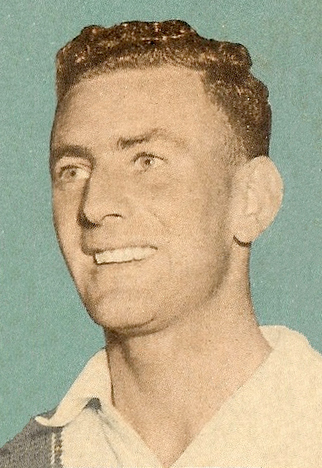
- Dooland in about 1948

Personal information
- Full name: Bruce Dooland
- Born: 1 November 1923; Cowandilla, South Australia
- Died: 8 September 1980 (aged 56); Bedford Park, South Australia
- Batting: Right-handed
- Bowling: Leg-break and googly
- Role: Bowling all-rounder

International information
- National side: Australia
- Test debut (cap 174): 1 January 1947 v England
- Last Test: 1 January 1948 v India

Domestic team information
- Years: Team
- 1945/46–1957/58: South Australia
- 1953–1957: Nottinghamshire

Career statistics
Competition	Test	First-class
Matches	3	214
Runs scored	76	7,141
Batting average	19.00	24.37
100s/50s	0/0	4/41
Top score	29	115*
Balls bowled	880	52,734
Wickets	9	1,016
Bowling average	46.55	21.98
5 wickets in innings	0	84
10 wickets in match	0	23
Best bowling	4/69	8/20
Catches/stumpings	3/–	186/–
- Source: CricketArchive, 14 January 2013

Bruce Dooland (1 November 1923 – 8 September 1980) was an Australian cricketer who played in three Test matches for the Australian national cricket team during the late 1940s.

During the war Dooland was in an Australian Commando unit serving in the South Pacific. A member of Z Special Unit, he took part in rescue, intelligence and sabotage missions in Borneo, often behind enemy lines.

After the war, he played Sheffield Shield cricket for South Australia and took the first post-war hat-trick in Australia. In 1946–47 he was called up for the Third Test in Melbourne against England and took 4/69 and 1/84. More importantly he held up one end while Colin McCool made his maiden Test century. He was kept for the Fourth Test in Melbourne and again defended stoutly while Keith Miller made his maiden Test century, but returned match figures of 3/198 and was dropped in favour of George Tribe. His Test career ended when, after Doug Ring and Colin McCool were preferred as the leg spin bowlers in the 1948 Australian touring party to England, he came to England to play in the Lancashire League and then qualified by residence to play for Nottinghamshire (Notts). In 1950–51 He toured India with the Commonwealth team.

The county team was at a low ebb and Dooland had the responsibility of being the first overseas import brought in specifically to strengthen the team. He played for them from 1953 to 1957, scoring 4,782 runs at an average of 24.52 and taking 770 wickets at 18.86. He completed the double of 1,000 runs and 100 wickets in a season twice and in another season missed it by only 30 runs. He took 16 for 83 in the match against Essex at Trent Bridge in 1954 and his total of 181 wickets for Nottinghamshire that season remains the club's record. Following his departure, Notts had their worst-ever period in terms of results.

Dooland played twice for the Players in the Gentlemen v Players match, and was a Wisden Cricketer of the Year in 1955. In 1956, when the Australian touring team played Notts, he taught Richie Benaud how to bowl the flipper.

He also played baseball for the West Torrens Baseball Club and was regarded as one of the best pitchers in his state, and represented Australia at baseball as well as cricket. He is West Torrens Baseball Club Team of the Century member.
