= Henry Cooper (educator) =

New Zealand educator

Sir Henry Cooper CBE
Personal information
- Full name: William Henry Cooper
- Born: 2 October 1909; Leam, Derbyshire, England
- Died: 4 September 1990 (aged 80); Auckland, New Zealand
- Batting: Right-handed
- Bowling: Right-arm medium

Domestic team information
- Years: Team
- 1941/42–1943/44: Auckland

Career statistics
Competition	First-class
Matches	3
Runs scored	99
Batting average	24.75
100s/50s	0/1
Top score	52
Balls bowled	120
Wickets	1
Bowling average	56.00
5 wickets in innings	0
10 wickets in match	0
Best bowling	1/3
Catches/stumpings	0/–
- Source: CricketArchive, 11 December 2014

Sir William Henry Cooper CBE (2 October 1909 – 4 September 1990) was a New Zealand educator who served as headmaster of Auckland Grammar School from 1954 to 1972, and later as chancellor of the University of Auckland. He was also a noted sportsman, playing representative cricket and field hockey for Auckland teams.

== Early life and education ==
Born in Leam, Derbyshire, Cooper was raised in New Zealand, on a farm at Waiuku. He attended Auckland Grammar School on a Rawlings Scholarship and went on to Auckland University College, then part of the University of New Zealand, from where he graduated Master of Arts with second-class honours in 1933.

== Cricket career ==
A right-handed middle-order batsman, Cooper played first-class cricket for Auckland during wartime, when interprovincial matches were played but the Plunket Shield was not contested. On debut against Wellington in February 1942, he came in fourth in the batting order, after Auckland's captain, Herb Pearson, and scored 28 runs in Auckland's only innings. Cooper's final two matches at first-class level came two seasons later, in December 1943 and January 1944. In the first of those matches, again against Wellington, he scored 52 runs in Auckland's first innings of 438/7 declared, his only half-century. He was less successful while batting in his final first-class match, against Canterbury, but took his only first-class wicket, having Francis O'Brien caught by Ces Burke.

== Education career ==
Cooper began teaching at Ponsonby School in 1929, alongside another new graduate, Marjory Adams, who was later headmistress of Epsom Girls' Grammar School. He began at Auckland Grammar in 1935, and in 1954 was appointed headmaster. He maintained a keen interest in sport, "read[ing] the sports results in full" at school assemblies, and also finding time to manage the New Zealand national cricket team's inaugural 1955–56 tour of India. Cooper retired as headmaster in 1972, and was replaced by John Graham, a former All Black. He was then named pro-chancellor, and later chancellor, of the University of Auckland, having been a longstanding member of its council.

== Honours and awards ==
In the 1965 New Year Honours, Cooper was appointed a Commander of the Order of the British Empire, for services to education. He was made a Knight Bachelor, for services to education and the community, in the 1985 New Year Honours. In 1974, he was awarded an honorary LLD by the University of Auckland.

== Death and legacy ==
Cooper died in Auckland in September 1990. His life was the subject of a 2005 biography by Andrew Mason, with a review of the book praising Cooper as a "profound meritocrat" whose "unremitting application of personal standards took him from farm boy to the best-known educationalist of his time".

== See also ==
- List of Auckland representative cricketers
