= John Hayes (cricketer) =

New Zealand cricketer

Johnny Hayes

Personal information
- Born: 11 January 1927; Auckland, New Zealand
- Died: 25 December 2007 (aged 80); Auckland, New Zealand
- Nickname: Haybags
- Batting: Right-handed
- Bowling: Right-arm fast

International information
- National side: New Zealand (1951–1958)
- Test debut (cap 51): 17 March 1951 v England
- Last Test: 24 July 1958 v England

Career statistics
Competition	Test	First-class
Matches	15	78
Runs scored	73	611
Batting average	4.86	9.54
100s/50s	0/0	0/0
Top score	19	36
Balls bowled	2,675	15,080
Wickets	30	292
Bowling average	40.56	23.14
5 wickets in innings	0	12
10 wickets in match	0	3
Best bowling	4/36	7/28
Catches/stumpings	3/–	29/–
- Source: Cricinfo, 1 April 2017

John Arthur Hayes (11 January 1927 – 25 December 2007) was a New Zealand Test cricketer who played 15 Test matches for the country between 1951 and 1958. Primarily a fast bowler bowling late away-swingers with a high action, he took 30 wickets in Tests. Perhaps his finest moment was taking 11 wickets for the New Zealanders against MCC at Lord's in 1958.

== Cricket career ==
Hayes was born in Auckland. He made his first-class debut for Auckland in December 1946. After only two first-class matches, and with the team looking for someone to support the aging Jack Cowie, he played in a trial match in January 1949 for the New Zealand side that toured England that year. He took five wickets for 73, and was selected for the tour led by Walter Hadlee. He took 26 wickets at a bowling average of 33 before a groin injury in July ruled him out for the remainder of the tour, playing in none of the test matches. John R. Reid rated him as the fastest bowler of the 1949 English season.

Nicknamed "Haybag", he made his Test debut against England at Christchurch in March 1951. He played against the touring West Indies team in 1951–52, but his job obliged him to miss the tour to South Africa in 1953–54. He played at home again against the touring English team in 1954–55, and toured to Pakistan and India in 1955–56. He missed playing in New Zealand's first Test victory, against the West Indies at Auckland in March 1956, and played his last four Tests on the tour to England in 1958, ending his Test career in the Fourth Test at Old Trafford. He was never on the winning side in a Test Match.

Hayes was New Zealand Cricket Almanack's Player of the Year in 1958. He played his last first-class match for the New Zealand Governor-General's XI against the touring MCC in Auckland in February 1961.

== After cricket ==
Outside cricket, he worked for a firm of importers and exporters in Auckland. In the 1980s and 1990s, he served as Morocco's honorary consul in New Zealand. He died in Auckland.
