= Tony MacGibbon =

New Zealand cricketer

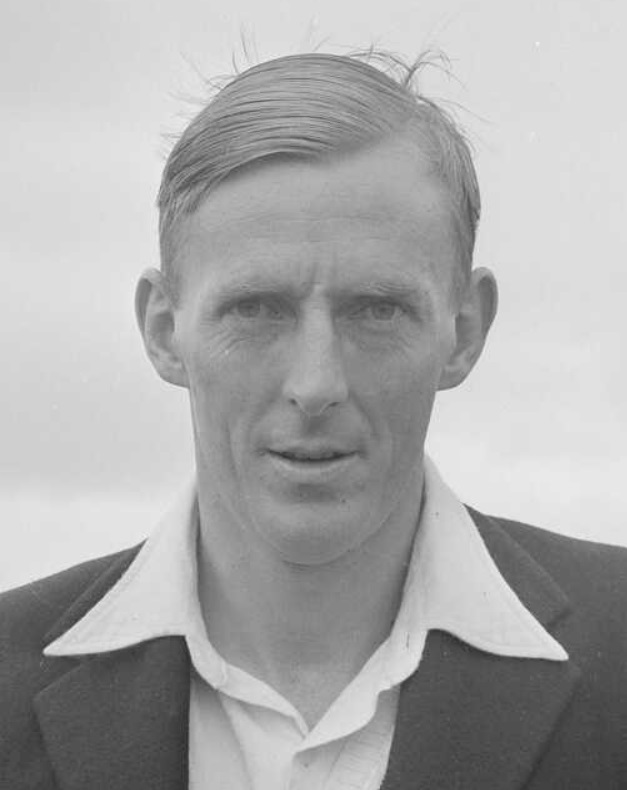
- Tony MacGibbon in 1956

Personal information
- Born: 28 August 1924; Christchurch, New Zealand
- Died: 6 April 2010 (aged 85); Christchurch, New Zealand
- Batting: Right-handed
- Bowling: Right-arm fast-medium

International information
- National side: New Zealand (1951–1958)
- Test debut (cap 52): 17 March 1951 v England
- Last Test: 21 August 1958 v England

Career statistics
Competition	Test	First-class
Matches	26	124
Runs scored	814	3,699
Batting average	19.85	19.88
100s/50s	0/3	0/14
Top score	66	94
Balls bowled	5,659	24,069
Wickets	70	356
Bowling average	30.85	26.12
5 wickets in innings	1	8
10 wickets in match	0	0
Best bowling	5/64	7/56
Catches/stumpings	13/–	81/–
- Source: Cricinfo, 1 April 2017

Anthony Roy MacGibbon (28 August 1924 – 6 April 2010) was a cricketer who played 26 Tests for New Zealand in the 1950s.

MacGibbon was a useful lower-order right-hand batsman and a right-arm fast-medium bowler who led the attack for his country for most of the 1950s.

== Early career ==
MacGibbon played first-class cricket for Canterbury from 1947 to 1948, and was in the trial match for the 1949 New Zealand tour to England, though he was not selected.

== International career ==
He made his Test debut against the 1950–51 England touring team but achieved little in the two matches, making 32 runs in four innings and failing to take a wicket. He was not much more successful in just one match against the touring South African cricket team two years later, though he did take his first Test wicket: Roy McLean.

But when New Zealand visited South Africa the following year he cut down the length of his run-up and was the team's most successful bowler, taking 22 wickets at the respectable average of under 21 runs per wicket. A second tour, to Pakistan and India in 1955–56, brought him less success as a bowler, but he played in all eight Tests and hit two 50s. Back home in New Zealand later that season, he was a member of the team that recorded New Zealand's first-ever Test victory against the West Indies at Auckland; when he bowled Alphonso Roberts in the first innings he became the first New Zealander to take 50 Test wickets.

MacGibbon's final Tests were played on the 1958 tour to England, when he was one of the few New Zealand players to come out of a disastrous tour in a wet summer with an enhanced reputation. In the first Test, he took five wickets in an innings for the only time in his international career: his five for 64 dismissed England for 221 in their first innings and he took three more wickets in the second innings, though England won the match comfortably enough. His 66 in the fourth Test at Old Trafford was not just the highest score of his own Test career, it was also New Zealand's highest of the series. On the tour as a whole, he scored 670 runs and took 73 wickets.

== After cricket ==
MacGibbon retired from Test cricket after the 1958 tour, and stayed in the UK to study civil engineering at Durham University. He played in New Zealand domestic cricket until 1961–62. He died on 6 April 2010.
