= Khershed Meherhomji =

Indian cricketer

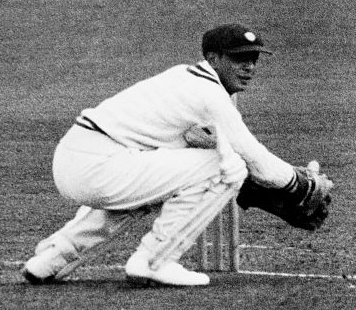
- Khershed Meherhomji in 1936

Personal information
- Full name: Khershed Rustomji Meherhomji
- Born: 9 August 1911; Bombay, British India
- Died: 10 February 1982 (aged 70); Bombay, Maharashtra, India
- Batting: Right-handed

International information
- National side: India
- Only Test (cap 24): 25 July 1936 v England

Career statistics
Competition	Test	First-class
Matches	1	30
Runs scored	0	656
Batting average	–	15.61
100s/50s	0/0	0/2
Top score	0*	71
Catches/stumpings	1/–	61/10
- Source: CricketArchive, 3 September 2022

Khershedji Rustomji Meherhomji (9 August 1911 – 10 February 1982) was an Indian cricketer who played as a wicket-keeper. Meherhomji toured England in 1936 and played in the Test at Manchester, representing Parsis in Bombay Pentangular and various sides in the Ranji Trophy. His uncle Rustomji Meherhomji toured England with the 1911 All India team.

Meherhomji studied at St Xavier's School and St Xavier's College in Mumbai. After matriculation, he worked in the state service of Nawanagar.

== Cricket career ==
In on first class debut in the Moin-ud-Dowla tournament in 1931–32, Meherhomji was one of the victims in a hat-trick by Ladha Ramji. Playing for Freelooters, Ramji took 8 wickets for 14 runs, Meherhomji taking all the three catches in his hat-trick.

Having joined the service of Nawanagar State, he represented Western India cricket team in the first season of Ranji Trophy, and took five wickets in an innings against Sind on his debut. He opened the batting in the unofficial Test at Lahore against Jack Ryder's Australians and was the selected for the tour of England. When Dattaram Hindlekar who kept the wickets in the first Test match developed an eye trouble, Meherhomji replaced him for the second Test at Manchester.

On the second day, Meherhomji partially dislocated a finger of his left hand. He went off the field for medical attention but there was no fracture. C. K. Nayudu stood behind the wickets, wearing gloves but without pads, during his absence. On his return, Meherhomji caught Gubby Allen, who had just been applauded on arrival for being appointed as captain for the next Ashes tour. Meherhomji conceded only five byes in the England total of 571 but Allen's catch would be his only one in Test cricket. For the third Test, he was replaced by Dilawar Hussain, a better batsman.

=== Domestic cricket ===
Back in India, he opened the innings with Framroze Nariman for Parsees in the Bombay Quadrangular in December. Harold Larwood opened the bowling for the Europeans. It was feared that he would be too fast for the Parsi batsmen. But it turned out that his bowling was "slower than that of Banerjee, let alone Nissar". Meherhomji treated Larwood with little respect and hit him for three fours in his innings of 16 in 15 minutes.

Meherhomji scored two fifties in first class cricket and both came in Bombay Pentangular matches for the Parsees. Against Europeans in November 1938, Parsees were set 253 to win. Starting their innings on the morning of the third day, Parsees lost a wicket off the fourth ball. Meherhomji added 91 for the second wicket with Nariman Canteenwala and reached his 50 in 70 minutes. He was third out for 66 in 78 minutes with 7 fours. From 164 for 3, Parsees lost their wickets after lunch to lose by 19 runs.

His career highest score of 71 also came in a lost cause against the Hindus in the 1941–42 final of the Pentangular. When Meherhomji joined Eddie Aibara in the second innings, Parsees were seven wickets down and needed 116 runs to avoid innings defeat. With not much at stake, Meherhomji attacked the bowling. "His daring and heroic hitting, though not perfect to the core, brought a new life into the hitherto dull and monotonous game", tells a report of the day. "He knew no steady game and seemed to believe in hitting hard". He outscored Aibara two to one and reached his fifty in 45 minutes. Hindus pushed the fielders around the boundary to slow the scoring. With six runs required to avoid innings defeat, Meherhomji was lbw to Krishnarao Jadhav. Hindus eventually needed just 38 runs and won in 22 minutes of batting.

Meherhomji was unfit and was not selected for the Western India v Bombay Ranji match in 1935–36. When one of the umpires did not turn up, he stood as the umpire.

== Later life ==
Later in his life, Meherhomji ran a sporting goods store and machinery spare parts business. He died from a paralytic stroke in Bombay in 1982. He is the uncle of the Australian cricket statistician Kersi Meher-Homji.
