= Nirode Chowdhury =

Indian cricketer

Personal information
- Full name: Nirode Ranjan Chowdhury
- Born: 23 May 1923; Jamshedpur, Bihar, British India
- Died: 14 December 1979 (aged 56); Durgapur, West Bengal, India
- Batting: Right-handed
- Bowling: Right arm off-break, right-arm medium pace

International information
- National side: India
- Test debut (cap 50): 27 January 1949 v West Indies
- Last Test: 2 November 1951 v England

Career statistics
Competition	Tests	First-class
Matches	2	58
Runs scored	3	419
Batting average	3.00	7.22
100s/50s	0/0	0/
Top score	3*	30*
Balls bowled	516	10,016
Wickets	1	200
Bowling average	205.00	25.14
5 wickets in innings	–	10
10 wickets in match	–	2
Best bowling	1/130	7/79
Catches/stumpings	0/-	22/-
- Source: CricketArchive

Nirode Ranjan "Putu" Chowdhury (23 May 1923, Jamshedpur, India – 14 December 1979, Durgapur, India) was an Indian cricketer. He was one of the earliest known test cricketers from Bengal.

A medium pace bowler, Putu Chowdhury had an outstanding start to his career. Playing for Bihar in the Ranji Trophy, he took 11, 9 and 10 wickets in his first three matches. In 1944–45, he took a hat-trick against Bengal Governor's XI in Eden Gardens which included the wickets of Vinoo Mankad, Mushtaq Ali and Lala Amarnath. He started his career with Bihar, moved in 1944 to Bengal, where he played most of his cricket, and returned to Bihar in 1955 towards the end of his career.

He made his Test debut against the West Indies at Madras in 1948/49. He took only one wicket but brilliantly ran out Everton Weekes who had scored hundreds in his five previous innings, and had reached 90 here. Weekes cut Vinoo Mankad to gully, started to run and was sent back. Chowdhury sent the throw to wicket keeper Probir Sen who ran Weekes out.

In 1951, he spent some time in Alf Gover's cricket school in England. He played a Test against England at home in 1951–52 without success and toured England in 1952 without playing in a Test. His bowling action was sometimes considered suspect, especially while bowling his faster ball.

He was allotted a benefit match which could not be played. He was a coach in the Durgapur steel plant in the later years. His Test bowling average of 205.00 is the second worst for India, after Sunil Gavaskar's 206.00.
