= M. J. Gopalan =

Indian sportsman (1909–2003)

Personal information
- Full name: Morapakkam Josyam Gopalan
- Born: 6 June 1909; Chennai, Madras Presidency, British India
- Died: 21 December 2003 (aged 94); Chennai, Tamil Nadu, India
- Batting: Right-handed
- Bowling: Right-arm fast medium

International information
- National side: India
- Only Test (cap 18): 5 January 1934 v England

Career statistics
Competition	Test	First-class
Matches	1	78
Runs scored	18	2,916
Batting average	18.00	24.92
100s/50s	0/0	1/17
Top score	11*	101*
Balls bowled	114	11,242
Wickets	1	194
Bowling average	39.00	24.20
5 wickets in innings	0	9
10 wickets in match	0	3
Best bowling	1/39	7/57
Catches/stumpings	3/–	49/–
- Source: ESPNcricinfo, 20 May 2020

Morappakam Josyam Gopalan (6 June 1909 – 21 December 2003) was an Indian sportsman who represented India in cricket and hockey.

Gopalan hailed from the village of Morappakam in Chingleput district, some 50 kilometres from Chennai. His family moved to Triplicane in Chennai when he was young. Gopalan was discovered by C. P. Johnstone, one of the founding fathers of Madras cricket. As was his practice with promising players, Johnstone gave him a job in the Burmah Shell. Gopalan soon switched his allegiance to the Triplicane Cricket Club. He owed his fame in local circles mainly to his performances here.

He was a fast medium bowler who moved the ball both ways. When he was selected to make his first class debut in the Madras Presidency tournament, it was not a popular decision. The crowd barracked him when he did not take a wicket till lunch on the first day, but he went on to take five wickets in each innings. He also impressed against Arthur Gilligan's MCC team which was touring India at the time.

Another performance of some significance were the two matches in 1930 for Madras against the Vizianagram XI which included Jack Hobbs. In the first, Gopalan dismissed Hobbs in both innings; in the second he clean bowled the great man with a leg-cutter that pitched on the leg stump and took the off bail. Against Ceylon in 1933, he took a famous hattrick, the first in Chepauk. This came in his eighth over when he took wickets with his first, third, fourth and fifth balls, hitting the middle stump each time.

When Ranji Trophy was inaugurated in 1934, Madras and Mysore (now Tamil Nadu and Karnataka) played the first match. To Gopalan went the honour of delivering the first ball of the tournament. His only Test match was against England at Calcutta in early 1934.

Gopalan's hockey career was helped by Robert Summerhayes who was to hockey in Madras what Johnstone was to cricket. In 1935, he toured New Zealand with the Indian hockey team which enjoyed enormous success. The next year he was selected for the cricket team to tour England. It was known beforehand that Gopalan would have a small role to play in the England tour because of the presence of Mohammad Nissar and Amar Singh. He might have been picked in the hockey team for the Berlin Olympics but chose to skip the Olympic trials. This turned out to be a terrible decision. The hockey team captained by Dhyan Chand, one of the finest teams in the history of the sport, won the gold medal with little difficulty. As it turned out, Gopalan did not play a Test in England. The tour was marred by internal politics and the team returned in disgrace.

Gopalan's batting improved with time. Johnstone wrote later that it featured a "stance at the wicket with his left toe cocked up in the air. Since it was the stance adopted by England's most famous cricketer, W. G. Grace, he could hardly be faulted on this account. He was then about a No.10 batsman, but by steady application he showed what improvement a bowler who really tries can make in batting and later on played many fine innings". The most celebrated of these 'many fine innings' was a 64 against the West Indians in 1949 which featured some thrilling driving.

In 1952, a silver jubilee fund was started to celebrate Gopalan's 25 years in cricket and hockey. An annual cricket match was instituted between Madras and Ceylon (later Tamil Nadu and Sri Lanka) for the M. J. Gopalan Trophy. This yearly tournament continued with a few interruptions till Sri Lanka got Test status in the early 1980s. It was revived in 2000 as a match between Tamil Nadu and a Colombo District Cricket Association. This also lapsed after two years. He served as a national selector for a few years in the 1950s.

Gopalan was the oldest living Test cricketer at the time of his death. According to him, he was born in 1906 but the year of his birth was recorded wrongly in the school records.

One of the entrances to the M. A. Chidambaram Stadium is named after Gopalan.

Preceded by Lindsay Weir	Oldest living test cricketer 31 October 2003 – 21 December 2003	Succeeded by Don Cleverley
