= Indian cricket team in England in 1936 =

International cricket tour

- Date: 29 April – 15 September 1936
- Location: England
- Result: England won the 3-Test series 2–0
Teams
- England: India
Captains
- Gubby Allen: Maharajkumar of Vizianagram
Most runs
- Wally Hammond (389) Stan Worthington (215) Joe Hardstaff Jr (96): Vijay Merchant (282); Mushtaq Ali (202); Cotah Ramaswami (170)
Most wickets
- Gubby Allen (20) Hedley Verity (15) Walter Robins (9): Mohammad Nissar (12); Amar Singh (10); CK Nayudu (4)

The India cricket team toured England in the 1936 season and played 28 first-class fixtures, winning only four whilst losing 12 and drawing 12. They played three Test matches against England and lost the series 2–0 with one match drawn. England won the First Test by 9 wickets at Lord's; the Second Test at Old Trafford was drawn; England won the Third Test at The Oval by 9 wickets.

The India team was captained by the Maharajkumar of Vizianagram, who was neither the greatest player nor the greatest captain of all time. But the team did include several top-class players such as Vijay Merchant, Mushtaq Ali and C. K. Nayudu.

== Touring party ==
- Maharajkumar of Vizianagram (c)
- C. K. Nayudu
- Syed Wazir Ali
- Mohammad Nissar
- Vijay Merchant
- Lala Amarnath
- Phiroze Palia
- Baqa Jilani
- Khershed Meherhomji (wk)
- Dattaram Hindlekar
- L. P. Jai
- M. J. Gopalan
- Cotah Ramaswami
- Mushtaq Ali
- Amir Elahi
- Shute Banerjee
- Mohammad Hussain
- Amar Singh
- Jahangir Khan
- Dilawar Hussain

The India squad for the tour was suggested by the Selection Committee consisting of the Nawab of Bhopal Hamidullah Khan, the Nawab of Pataudi and Maharajkumar of Vizianagram to the Board of Cricket Control on 16 February 1936. The Maharajkumar was named the captain. The Yuvraj of Patiala Yadavindra Singh declined to be a part owing to personal reasons. Syed Mohammad Hadi was named the treasurer of the squad for the tour.

== Test Series ==
=== First Test ===
27–30 June 1936
Scorecard

India	v	England
147 (55.1 overs); Vijay Merchant 35; Gubby Allen 5/35 (17 overs)		134 (61.1 overs); Morris Leyland 60; Amar Singh 6/35 (25.1 overs)
93 (46 overs); Dattaram Hindlekar 17; Gubby Allen 5/43 (18 overs)		108/1 (39.3 overs); Harold Gimblett 67; Mohammad Nissar 1/26 (6 overs)

England won by 9 wickets
Lord's Cricket Ground, London
Umpires: Arthur Dolphin and Fanny Walden

- England won the toss and decided to field.
- 3-day match; 28 June was a rest day
- Harold Gimblett (Eng), and Dattaram Hindlekar and Maharajkumar of Vizianagram (Ind) made their Test debuts.

=== Second Test ===
25–28 July 1936
Scorecard

India	v	England
203 (68.1 overs); Syed Wazir Ali 42; Hedley Verity 4/41 (17 overs)		571/8d (142 overs); Wally Hammond 167; CK Nayudu 2/84 (22 overs)
390/5 (115 overs); Vijay Merchant 114; Walter Robins 3/103 (29 overs)

Match drawn
Old Trafford, Manchester
Umpires: Frank Chester and Fanny Walden

- India won the toss and decided to bat.
- 3-day match; 26 July was a rest day.
- Arthur Fagg, Laurie Fishlock and Alf Gover (Eng), and Cotah Ramaswami and Khershed Meherhomji (Ind) made their Test debuts.
- Vijay Merchant and Syed Mushtaq Ali (both Ind) made their first centuries in Tests.
- Gubby Allen and Walter Robins (both Eng) claimed their 50th wicket in Tests.

=== Third Test ===
15–18 August 1936
Scorecard

England	v	India
471/8d (129 overs); Wally Hammond 217; Mohammad Nissar 5/120 (26 overs)		222 (85.5 overs); Vijay Merchant 52; Jim Sims 5/73 (18.5 overs)
64/1 (13 overs); Charlie Barnett 32; Mohammad Nissar 1/36 (7 overs)		312 (f/o) (93 overs); CK Nayudu 81; Gubby Allen 7/80 (20 overs)

England won by 9 wickets
Kennington Oval, Kennington
Umpires: Frank Chester and Fanny Walden

- England won the toss and decided to bat.
- 3-day match; 16 August was a rest day.
- Baqa Jilani (Ind) made his Test debut.

== Controversy ==
Another top-class player was Lala Amarnath but the tour was marred by controversy as recorded in A Right Royal Indian Mess on ESPNcricinfo, with Amarnath being sent home early for spurious "disciplinary" reasons. Ultimately, after a long saga of closed ranks and establishment incompetence, he was completely exonerated.

== Annual reviews ==
- Wisden Cricketers' Almanack 1937
