= Dattaram Hindlekar =

Indian cricketer (1909–1949)

Personal information
- Full name: Dattaram Dharmaji Kanaji Hindlekar
- Born: 1 January 1909; Bombay (now Mumbai), Bombay Presidency, British India
- Died: 30 March 1949 (aged 40); Bombay, Maharashtra, India
- Batting: Right-handed
- Role: Wicket-keeper-batsman
- Relatives: Vijay Manjrekar (nephew); Sanjay Manjrekar (great-nephew)

International information
- National side: India
- Test debut (cap 22): 27 June 1936 v England
- Last Test: 17 August 1946 v England

Domestic team information
- Years: Team
- 1934–1946: Mumbai

Career statistics
| Competition | Tests | First-class |
|---|---|---|
| Matches | 4 | 96 |
| Runs scored | 71 | 2,439 |
| Batting average | 14.20 | 17.05 |
| 100s/50s | 0/0 | 1/9 |
| Top score | 26 | 135 |
| Catches/stumpings | 3/0 | 128/59 |
- Source: ESPNcricinfo, 23 March 2019

Dattaram Dharmaji Hindlekar (1 January 1909 – 30 March 1949) was a cricketer who kept wicket for India in Test cricket.

== Cricket career ==
Hindlekar toured England in 1936 and 1946 as India's first-choice wicket-keeper. A right-handed batsman, he wore his cap at a "bewildered angle" and "stood with his toes pointing up at an angle of 45 degrees". He opened in the First Test at Lord's in 1936, but had to stand down after he chipped a bone in his finger and suffered from blurred vision. This injury and his subsequent exclusion from the next Test led to the famous opening partnership between Vijay Merchant and Mushtaq Ali.

He was an unexpected selection for the 1946 tour. Injuries limited his appearances here as well. In the Manchester Test, he went in last and batted out 13 minutes with Ranga Sohoni to save the match.

== Personal life ==
Hindlekar was born in a Marathi family in Bombay, the son of a farmer from Ratnagiri in Maharashtra. He worked in the Bombay Port Trust for a salary of ₹ 80 a month. His means were so limited that he could not afford to buy a pair of gloves, and used to visit Khershed Meherhomji and borrow his. He was the uncle of Vijay Manjrekar and great-uncle of Sanjay Manjrekar.

Hindlekar died at the age of 40 for want of proper treatment. It was only at a very late stage of his illness that he was moved to the Arthur Road Hospital in Bombay. He was survived by his wife and their seven children. After his death, the BCCI and Bombay Cricket Association issued appeals for contributions to help his family, but there was little response. The Bombay Port Trust then organised a cabaret dance on 6 August 1949 which raised a little over Rs. 7,000. Almost every major Indian cricketer of the time attended the dance.
