= Vasant Ranjane =

Indian cricketer (1937–2011)

Personal information
- Full name: Vasant Baburao Ranjane
- Born: 22 July 1937; Pune, Bombay Province, British India
- Died: 22 December 2011 (aged 74); Pune, Maharashtra, India
- Batting: Right-handed
- Bowling: Right-arm fast-medium

International information
- National side: India
- Test debut (cap 86): 12 December 1958 v West Indies
- Last Test: 2 October 1964 v Australia

Career statistics
Competition	Test	First-class
Matches	7	64
Runs scored	40	701
Batting average	6.66	14.91
100s/50s	0/0	0/0
Top score	16	56*
Balls bowled	1,265	4,854
Wickets	19	175
Bowling average	34.15	27.73
5 wickets in innings	0	6
10 wickets in match	0	2
Best bowling	4/72	9/35
Catches/stumpings	1/–	22/–
- Source: CricInfo, 31 May 2022

Vasant Baburao Ranjane (22 July 1937 – 22 December 2011) was an Indian cricketer who played in seven Test matches between 1958 and 1964.

Vasant Ranjane was a 'slightly built, unlikely looking figure for an opening bowler' who relied more on line and length than speed for his wickets, but could 'swing both ways and cut the ball off the seam'.

As a young boy, Ranjane used to frequent the grounds of the Shivaji Preparatory School in Poona where Madhusudan Rege used to coach. He put this to practice at the Sangam Wadi Union Club, from where he was picked by the talent scouts of the Vilas Club. This paved the way for playing in the first division and first class cricket.

Ranjane had a fabulous start to his first class career when he took nine wickets for 35 in an innings on his debut (13 for 71 in the match) including a hat-trick for Maharashtra against Saurashtra in 1956–57. The role was reversed when he played his first Test two years later against West Indies at Green Park, Kanpur, when his only wicket was the one missed by Subhash Gupte who took 9 for 102. He was hit on the thigh by a full toss from Wes Hall while batting and was unable to bowl in the second innings. Surendranath replaced him in the next Test.

He was recalled to the Test side three years later against England where he took ten wickets in three Tests. This was followed by the tour to West Indies in 1961–62. Partly due to the presence of too many all-rounders in the side, Ranjane played only in the final Test where he took the wickets of Conrad Hunte, Rohan Kanhai, Gary Sobers and Frank Worrell.

Ranjane came from a very poor background. After his father, who was a factory worker, died when Ranjane was ten, his mother worked as a maid in a hospital to support the family. Ranjane dropped out of the school after the seventh standard. He managed to find a job as a fitter in the Indian Railways where he continued till 1994, but it was hardly sufficient to maintain his six children.

When his sufferings got exposure in the media in the early 1980s, the Board of Control for Cricket in India allotted him a benefit match at Nagpur between India and the touring West Indies side in 1983. He also received an ex gratia payment from the BCCI when his house was damaged in the floods in Poona in the 1960s. His son Subhash played cricket for Maharashtra.
