= Kersi Meher-Homji =

Australian journalist, author and biographer

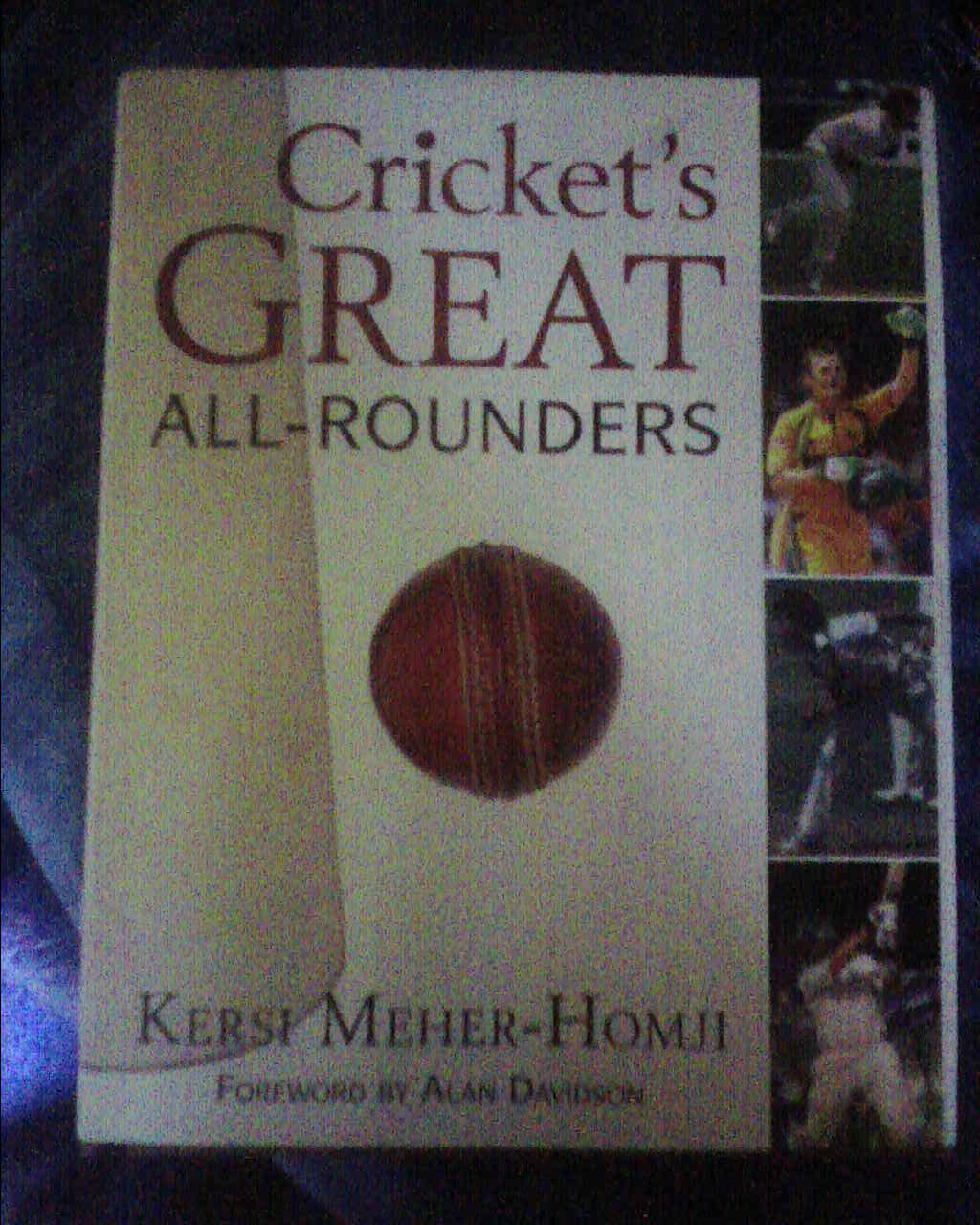
Cricket's Great All-Rounders

Kersi Meher-Homji is an Australian journalist, author and biographer. He writes often for The Sydney Morning Herald, and his most notable biography is The Waugh Twins (1998), about Steve and Mark Waugh. He is of Indian Parsi descent and the nephew of former cricketer Khershed Meherhomji.

Meher-Homji and his wife migrated from India to Australia in 1970. He worked as a virologist at Sydney University and then with the Red Cross blood transfusion service.

In November 2012, his 14th book Cricket Conflicts and Controversies (foreword by Greg Chappell) was reviewed in "Inside Cricket, Inside Sport, The Roar website and MiD Day.

His previous book, Cricket's Great All-rounders, which profiles briefly the greatest all-rounders in the history of the game, was published in 2008 to a review from Cricinfo staff writer Brydon Coverdale, who felt that some of Homji's inclusions (such as that of Michael Bevan) were generous to say the least. This liberality, though, was not necessarily a bad thing. "Commendably," wrote Coverdale, "the book extends the traditional definition even further and includes chapters on wicketkeeper-batsmen and those useful types who have excelled in the one-day arena."

In June 2022, Meher-Homji was awarded the Medal of the Order of Australia in the 2022 Queen's Birthday Honours for "service to the multicultural community, and to cricket".
