= Prakash Nayudu =

Indian athlete and police officer

Prakash Rao Nayudu (20 November 1937 – 12 March 1997) was an Indian athlete and police officer.

During his athletic career he represented the Madhya Pradesh cricket team and participated in the World Table Tennis Championships in singles and doubles. Nayudu won the Table Tennis Open Title 27 times and the Triple Crown on several occasions in Madhya Pradesh. He also served as a police officer, during which time he received such honors as the President's Police Medal for meritorious services.

His father, C. K. Nayudu, was the first captain of the Indian cricket team in Test matches. Prakash Nayudu had three children.son Pratap Nayudu and daughters Padmaja and Varsha. Pratap Nayudu is international arm wrestler having won two medals in World arm sport Championship (2013), three consecutive medals in Indian National Championships (2013, 2014, 2015) and six gold medals in armsport Championships (1991–2015) in Madhya Pradesh, India. He holds the current State Record of being the first ever arm-wrestler of MP to become the National Champion for the third consecutive year with two gold and one silver medal.
