= Dilawar Hussain (cricketer) =

Indian cricketer

Personal information
- Born: 19 March 1907; Lahore, British India
- Died: 26 August 1967 (aged 60); Lahore, Pakistan
- Batting: Right-handed
- Role: Wicketkeeper-batsman
- Relatives: Waqar Ahmed (son)

International information
- National side: India (1934–1936)
- Test debut (cap 17): 5 January 1934 v England
- Last Test: 15 August 1936 v England

Career statistics
Competition	Tests	First-class
Matches	3	57
Runs scored	254	2,394
Batting average	42.33	28.16
100s/50s	0/3	4/13
Top score	59	122
Balls bowled	–	90
Wickets	–	0
Bowling average	–	–
5 wickets in innings	–	0
10 wickets in match	–	0
Best bowling	–	–
Catches/stumpings	6/1	69/33
- Source: ESPNcricinfo, 15 May 2020

Dilawar Hussain (19 March 1907 – 26 August 1967) was a Pakistani administrator and cricketer. He played for India national cricket team as a Test cricketer in the 1930s.

Dilawar kept wicket for India in three Test matches. On his debut, Dilawar was made to open the innings against England on a green wicket in Calcutta in 1933-34. He was hit on the head by a delivery from Morris Nichols and retired. He returned with a bandage over his head, and was hit on the thumb by Nobby Clark, but top scored with 59. He made 57 in the second innings and is one of the few Test cricketers to top-score in both innings on debut. He had started his first-class career making 64 and 112 in his first match. His last appearance came about in the 1936 Indian tour of England; Dilawar was studying at Cambridge University at the time and joined the team in England.

The Indian Test batsman Cota Ramaswami has painted an exquisite picture of Dilawar:

He was a tall and bulky person with a prominent stomach and invariably played with a clean shaven head without any hat or cap or any kind of headgear. He always wore very loose pants and after batting for a while or keeping wicket for sometime his shirt will be hanging out of the trousers and somebody must tuck it in, now and then. He had a rather ugly and uncouth stance at the wicket as he held his bat very low and bent his body forward so much that his head was practically in line with the top of the wickets. Those who watched him from the on side could only see his prominent hind portion of the body sticking up while the head, bat and the rest of Dilawar Hussain were hardly visible. However, he had a very sound defence and so it was very difficult to get him out. He was the most selfish batsman that I have ever seen.

He played first-class cricket in India from 1925 to 1941, with a gap between 1935 and 1938 while he was studying at Cambridge.

Richard Cashman writes that he had an encyclopedic memory which enabled him to recall cricket score sheets at will and was also a "great eater and talker", "who could liven the passing hour with an unbroken monologue on any subject from philosophy ... to the art of seasoning a good curry".

Dilawar was known as "Professor" in his later years. He took a doctorate in Philosophy and was a double MA degree holder. He served as the Principal of Government College and the Muslim Anglo-Oriental College, both in Lahore. He was a founder member of the Cricket Control Board in Pakistan and a selector.
