= C. K. Nayudu Trophy =

Under 23 first class cricket tournament in India

C.K. Nayudu Trophy
- Administrator: BCCI
- Headquarters: NCA, Bengaluru
- Format: Under-23 First Class Cricket
- First edition: 1973-74
- Latest edition: 2024–25
- Tournament format: Round-robin, then knockout
- Number of teams: 38
- Current champion: Tamil Nadu
- Most successful: Mumbai
- TV: YouTube
- Website: www.bcci.tv
- Longest continuous champion: Mumbai
- 2024–25

The Colonel C. K. Nayudu Trophy is a domestic cricket championship played in India between 38 under-23 teams representing various state and regional cricket associations. It is organised by the Board of Control for Cricket in India (BCCI) and is named after India's first Test cricket captain C. K. Nayudu. Each match is played over four-days. Over its history, it has been played with various age-limits including under-22, under-23, under-25. The current champions are Tamil Nadu who defeated Maharashtra in 2026 at Dindigul.

== History ==
In 1973–74, BCCI named a tournament for under-22 cricketers after India's first Test cricket captain, C. K. Nayudu. It was initially called 'Junior Tournament of India for the Colonel Nayudu Trophy'. The trophy was donated by the Bombay Cricket Association from the funds collected to perpetuate the memory of Nayudu. Until 2003–04 season, the tournament was played in zonal format.

From 2014 to 2015 season onwards, BCCI lowered the age-limit for the tournament from 25 to 23 and restricted the number of Ranji Trophy cricketers in the playing XI to only three. The age-limit of 23 continued till the 2019–20 season. From 2021 to 2022 season onwards, the BCCI brought back the age-limit to 25 years. in 2024 BCCI changed it to Under-23 Tournament again.

== Winners ==
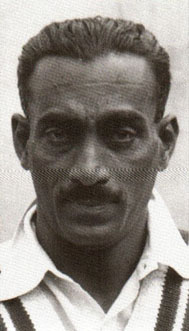
C. K. Nayudu, after whom the tournament is named

The following teams have won the tournament:

| Season | Winner | Runner-up | Note | Ref |
|---|---|---|---|---|
| 2007–08 | Mumbai | Maharashtra | U-22 | |
| 2014–15 | Uttar Pradesh | Himachal Pradesh | U-23 | |
| 2015–16 | Mumbai | Madhya Pradesh | U-23 | |
| 2016–17 | Punjab | Andhra | U-23 | |
| 2017–18 | Delhi | Mumbai | U-23 | |
| 2018–19 | Punjab | Bengal | U-23 | |
| 2019–20 | Vidarbha | Madhya Pradesh | U-23 | |
| 2020–21 | Not held due to the COVID-19 pandemic | | | |
| 2021–22 | Mumbai | Vidarbha | U-25 | |
| 2022–23 | Gujarat | Mumbai | U-25 | |
| 2023–24 | Karnataka | Uttar Pradesh | U-23 | |
| 2024–25 | Punjab | Mumbai | U-23 | |
| 2025–26 | Tamil Nadu | Maharashtra | U-23 | |
