= Bombay Gymkhana =

Gymkhana in Mumbai, India

Coordinates: 18°56′14.75″N 72°49′52.36″E

- Esplanade Maidan; Azad Maidan
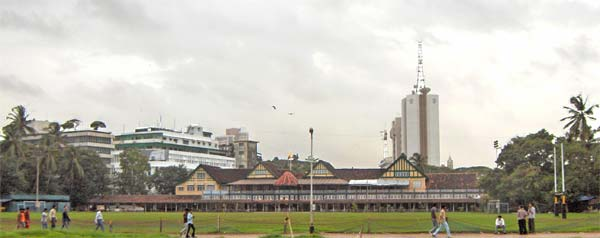
- Picture of the Bombay Gymkhana
- Interactive map of Bombay Gymkhana

Ground information
- Location: South Mumbai, Maharashtra, India
- Country: India
- Establishment: 19 June 1875
- Capacity: 15,000
- Architect: Claude Batley
- Operator: Bombay Gymkhana
- Tenants: India national rugby union team Local clubs

International information
- Only men's Test: 15–18 December 1933: India v England
- Only women's ODI: 16 December 2004: India v Australia
- As of 12 August 2015; Source: Bombay Gymkhana Ground, ESPNcricinfo

The Bombay Gymkhana, established in 1875, is a premier private members' club in the city of Mumbai, India.

It is located at the triangular end of Azad Maidan in the Fort area of South Mumbai and is in close proximity of Chhatrapati Shivaji Maharaj Terminus. It was originally built as a British-only gentlemen's club, designed by English architect, Claude Batley.

The club grounds offers various sporting facilities for rugby, football, cricket, swimming, tennis, badminton, squash and a fitness centre for its members. The club regularly conducts sporting events and tournaments for its members and admission to the club is reserved by membership. Bombay Gymkhana Rugby Club (rugby union) is a tenant.

== Sports ==
A long building which serves as the lobby, table tennis area, badminton court. Cricket is played here in the winter months, rugby and football in the monsoon months. This used to be major centre for the erstwhile Bombay Pentangular cricket matches. The ground had the distinction of hosting India's first home test cricket match starting on 15 December 1933, captained by CK Nayudu. Temporary stands were put up at the ground to accommodate a record crowd of 50,000 people, with tickets selling at five times their usual price. The match is remembered for Lala Amarnath's century, noted to be one of the best innings played in Indian cricket. The ground has not hosted any senior matches since the Brabourne Stadium took its place in 1937, replacing the ground as the venue for the Bombay Pentangular as well as international matches. The ground also has the distinction of hosting the first international test cricket match played by the disabled, on 10 December 2002 between India and England. The one-day match was won by India. The Australia national cricket team used the grounds to practice prior to their clash with India at the 1996 Cricket World Cup. In 2004, the India women's team played a One Day International versus Australia at Bombay Gymkhana. In March 2010, Mumbai Indians played a practice match at the ground ahead of the IPL Season. Later in the year, Canada played a match against a Bombay Gymkhana team to prepare for the 2011 Cricket World Cup. The ground also hosts a national rugby competition, and has hosted matches against Sri Lanka and other South Asian teams as a part of the HSBC Sevens Asia circuit. It has also hosted national and international squash tournaments.

Flag of Bombay Gymkhana

== Road widening controversy ==
In 2016, the BMC (Brihanmumbai Municipal Corporation) wanted to widen the adjacent Hazarimal Somani Marg from 50 feet (15 m) to 80 feet (24 m) and required about 5,809 square metres (62,530 sq ft) of land from the Bombay Gymkhana. The gymkhana contested the proposal stating its heritage status. The Gymkhana has also been allegedly charged for illegally constructing additional buildings including a CEO's bungalow and a wine shop.

== International centuries ==
=== Tests ===
This is the list of centuries scored in Test matches at Bombay Gymkhana, Mumbai

No.	Score	Player	Team	Inns.	Opposing team	Date	Result
1	136	Bryan Valentine	England	2	India	15 December 1933	Won
2	118	Lala Amarnath	India	3	England	15 December 1933	Lost

== List of five-wicket hauls ==
=== Tests ===
Two five-wicket hauls in Test matches have been taken at the venue.

No.	Bowler	Date	Team	Opposing team	Inn	Overs	Runs	Wkts	Econ	Result
1	Mohammad Nissar	15 December 1933	India	England	2	33.5	90	5	2.66	Lost
2	Stan Nichols	15 December 1933	England	India	3	23.5	55	5	2.30	Won

== See also ==
- List of Test cricket grounds
- One-Test wonder
- List of India's gentlemen's clubs
