= Cotah Ramaswami =

Indian cricketer and tennis player

Personal information
- Born: 16 June 1896; Madras, Madras presidency, British India
- Died: c. January 1990
- Batting: Left-handed
- Bowling: Right-arm

International information
- National side: India
- Test debut (cap 25): 25 July 1936 v England
- Last Test: 15 August 1936 v England

Career statistics
Competition	Test	First-class
Matches	2	53
Runs scored	170	2,400
Batting average	56.66	28.91
100s/50s	0/1	2/12
Top score	60	127*
Balls bowled	–	1,691
Wickets	–	30
Bowling average	–	33.06
5 wickets in innings	–	0
10 wickets in match	–	0
Best bowling	–	4/29
Catches/stumpings	0/–	33/–
- Source: ESPNcricinfo

Cotah Ramaswami – sometimes written as Cota or Cotar – (born 16 June 1896, presumed to have died in January 1990) was a double sports international who represented India in cricket and tennis.

== Family and early life ==
Ramaswami came from one of the leading sports families in India. He was the youngest son of Buchi Babu Naidu, often considered the father of South Indian cricket. His two brothers, son and four nephews all played first class cricket.

When the only brother of his mother died young, Ramaswami was given in adoption to his maternal grandfather, which led to his family name being different from that of his brothers.

He studied in Wesley High School, Wesley College and the Presidency. On one occasion while at Wesley, he put on more than 200 runs for the last wicket to win a match after his team was 50 for nine, himself scoring 188*. He went on to Cambridge University in 1919 where he studied until 1923.

== Tennis ==
In the summer of 1920, he won the singles title at the Leamington Open Tournament, that included all students in the university, he defeated Sir John Cecil F. Masterman in the final, and was awarded the Doherty Cup for his endeavours, the same year he was a quarter finalist at the Midland Counties Championships at Edgbaston. He won a 'half blue' that year, representing Cambridge in the doubles, and earned a blue in 1921. On a tour of Holland, he won the singles and the doubles partnering S. M. Hadi – another future first class cricketer.

During the summer of 1921 he won the Hornsey Grass Courts tournament against the Malayan player David Henry Kleinman, he was also a losing finalist at the Warwickshire Championships, and the Sussex Championships. In 1922, Ramaswami represented India in the Davis Cup with Dr. A. H. Fyzee and A. A. Fayzee. India defeated Romania in the first round at Bristol but lost to Spain in Beckenham. Ramaswami played only in the doubles partnering Dr. Fyzee and won both his matches. The Spanish pair of Comte de Gomar and Flaquer, whom they beat in five sets, went on to play the doubles finals at Wimbledon in 1923.

In 1922, Ramaswami took part in Wimbledon Championships, reaching the second round, the same year he won the Reigate LTC Tournament at Reigate against Charles G. Howard. In 1923 he won the singles title at the South of England Championships defeating Gordon Lowe in the final in three sets, the same year he was a losing finalist North London Hard Courts Championships (autumn meeting) at Hendon on clay. In February 1925 he won the Southern India Championships held at Madras against George H. Perkins.

== Work career ==
Ramaswami returned to Madras in January 1924 and joined the Agricultural Department as an Officer. He served in different parts of the Madras Presidency in the next 24 years.

As a professor of agronomy at University of Madras, he taught M. S. Swaminathan both agriculture and cricket.

== Cricket ==
Ramaswami was an attacking left-handed batsman. He played first-class cricket in India from 1915 to 1942. He represented the Indians in the annual Madras Presidency Matches from 1915 to 1940, and played for Madras in the Ranji Trophy from 1934 to 1941.

Ramaswami's two appearances in Test matches came in England in 1936 when he was already 40. He wrote later in his autobiography that he was picked for non-cricketing reasons. Though well past his prime at the time, he scored 40 and 60 on debut and ended his career with an average of 56. Ramaswami played for Hindus against Arthur Gilligan's MCC team in 1926-27 and scored 83 against Jack Ryder's Australian Services XI in 1935–36. He made his highest score of 127 not out against Lancashire in 1936.

After the end of his career, he served as a selector, and manager to the Indian team to West Indies in 1952–53. His Ramblings of a Games Addict (1967) is one of the first autobiographies in Indian cricket. He is one of the four Indian cricketing double internationals, the others being S. M. Hadi, M. J. Gopalan, and Yuzvendra Chahal.

Ramaswami married Lakshmi Chaya Devi in 1928. He had two sons, Ram Swarup and Lakshman Swarup, and a daughter, Shantha Devi. Ram Swarup represented Madras and Andhra in first-class cricket.

== Disappearance ==
Ramaswami left his home in Adyar on the morning of 15 October 1985 and never returned. There were occasional rumours about him being sighted. Wisden listed him as "presumed dead" from 1988 to 1991. When doubts were raised about his fate, this was removed in 1992 but brought back in 1996. In the more recent editions, he is listed as having died in January 1990, as he is also now by ESPNcricinfo and CricketArchive.

== Notes ==
- Ramaswami's family name appears variously as Cota, Cotah and Cotar – Cota being the most common version. This article uses Cotah as the title because this is the version used by Ramaswami in his memoirs.

== See also ==
- List of people who disappeared mysteriously: post-1970
