= Lala Amarnath =

Indian cricketer (1911–2000)

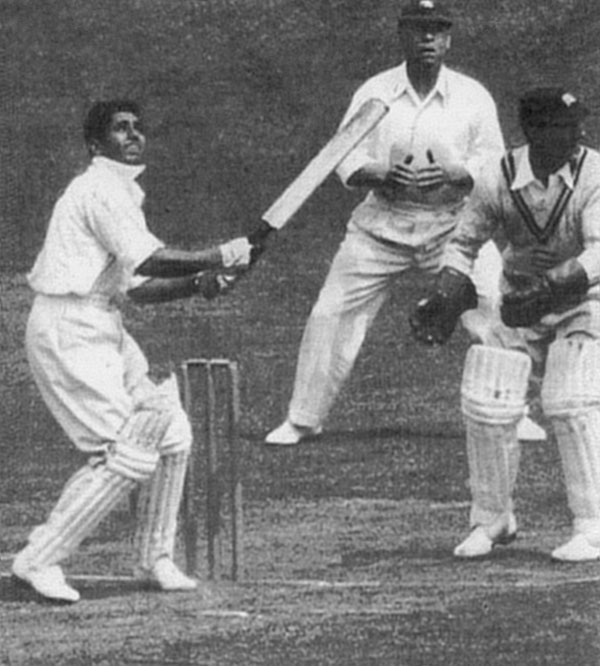
- Amarnath batting at Lord's in 1936

Personal information
- Born: 11 September 1911; Kapurthala, Punjab, British India
- Died: 5 August 2000 (aged 88); New Delhi, India
- Batting: Right-handed
- Bowling: Right-arm medium

International information
- National side: India (1933–1952)
- Test debut (cap 12): 15 December 1933 v England
- Last Test: 12 December 1952 v Pakistan

Career statistics
Competition	Test	First-class
Matches	24	186
Runs scored	878	10,426
Batting average	24.38	41.37
100s/50s	1/4	31/39
Top score	118	262
Balls bowled	4,241	29,474
Wickets	45	463
Bowling average	32.91	22.98
5 wickets in innings	2	19
10 wickets in match	0	3
Best bowling	5/96	7/27
Catches/stumpings	13	96/2
- Source: Lala Amarnath, 12 May 2020

Lala Amarnath Bhardwaj (11 September 1911 – 5 August 2000) was an Indian cricketer. He is considered to be the father figure of Indian cricket. He scored the first ever century for India in Test Cricket in 1933. He was independent India's first cricket captain and captained India in their first Test series win against Pakistan in 1952.

He played only three Test matches before World War II (India played no official Test matches during the war). During this time he amassed around 10,000 runs with 30 hundreds in first-class cricket which included teams from Australia and England. After the war, he played another 21 Test Matches for India. He later became the chairman of the Senior Selection Committee, BCCI and was also a commentator and expert. His proteges include Chandu Borde, M.L. Jaisimha, and Jasu Patel who played for India. His sons Surinder and Mohinder Amarnath also became Test players for India. His grandson Digvijay is also a current first-class player. The Government of India awarded him the civilian honour of the Padma Bhushan in 1991. Amarnath received the inaugural C. K. Nayudu Lifetime Achievement Award

== Early life ==
Amarnath was born in an impoverished Punjabi-speaking Brahmin family of Kapurthala, Punjab. Recognizing his talent in Lahore, against Muslimclub in which famous Hanif Muhammad family played, he got a chance to play in Bombay. He played his debut match against England in 1933 on the Bombay Gymkhana grounds in South Bombay. Amarnath also played for the Hindus in the Bombay Quadrangular. Aside from being a batsman, Lala Amarnath was also a bowler, the only one to dismiss Donald Bradman hit wicket.

== Test career ==
In 1933's England's tour of India, Lala Amarnath was leading run-scorer. In the series he created history by scoring first ever Test 100 by an Indian batsman at Bombay.

Amarnath was controversially sent back from the 1936 tour of England by the captain, the Maharajkumar of Vizianagram, for "indiscipline". Amarnath and others allege it was due to politics. Vizzy, the Maharajkumar of Vizianagram, was named the captain for Indian cricket team for the 1936 tour of England, a post that he secured after lobbying and manipulation. Some of the senior players in the squad, including Lala Amarnath, C. K. Nayudu and Vijay Merchant, were critical of Vizzy's playing abilities and captaincy, and the team was split between those who supported and criticised the captain. During India's match against Minor Counties at Lord's Lala Amarnath had been nursing a back injury during the game. Vizzy had Amarnath's pad up but did not put him in to bat as a succession of other batsmen were sent in ahead of him, which prevented Amarnath from resting his injury. Amarnath was finally put in to bat at the end of the day. Visibly angry after returning to the dressing room, he threw his kit into his bag and muttered in Punjabi, "I know what is transpiring". Vizzy took this as an affront and conspired with team manager Major Jack Brittain-Jones to have Lala Amarnath sent back from the tour without playing the first test match. It is also alleged that in the first test against the England, Vizzy offered Mushtaq Ali a gold watch to run out Vijay Merchant.

== Captain and manager ==
Lala Amarnath was the captain of the Indian team that toured Australia in 1947-1948. When the Partition of India took place in August 1947, Amarnath and his family had to flee the city to escape a Muslim mob. He lived in Patiala in the Indian state of Punjab till 1957, when he moved to the capital, Delhi. Lala Amarnath had received his education at Aligarh Muslim University. Amarnath is widely respected for reaching out to bridge the divide between players and fans of India and Pakistan, caused by political tensions between the two countries. Under his leadership, India won its first-ever Test against Pakistan in Delhi in 1952 and went on to win the series 2–1. Amarnath also managed the team when it toured Pakistan in 1954-55.

== Family and legacy ==
His sons Mohinder and Surinder also played cricket for India and another son Rajinder played first-class cricket while his grandson Digvijay is also a first-class player. Throughout his twilight years, Amarnath was considered a living legend of Indian cricket.

Mohinder played the role of his father in the 2021 sports drama 83, while Mohinder himself was portrayed by Saqib Saleem. Both of them had previously shared screen space in the 2016 action comedy Dishoom.

Preceded by Nawab of Pataudi, snr	Indian National Test Cricket Captain; 1947/48-1948/49	Succeeded by Vijay Hazare
Preceded by Vijay Hazare	Indian National Test Cricket Captain; 1952/3	Succeeded by Vijay Hazare
Preceded by Learie Constantine	Nelson Cricket Club; Professional; 1938–1939	Succeeded by Bert Nutter
