= English cricket team in India in 1933–34 =

International cricket tour

England in India 1933-34
	India	England
- Dates: 15 December 1933 – 4 March 1934
Captains	CK Nayudu	Douglas Jardine

Test series
- Result: England won the 3-match series 2–0
Most runs	Lala Amarnath (203)	Cyril Walters (284)
Most wickets	Amar Singh (13)	Hedley Verity (24)

A cricket team from England organised by the Marylebone Cricket Club (MCC) and captained by Douglas Jardine, toured India from 15 December 1933 to 4 March 1934. In the Test matches, the side was known as "England"; in other matches, it was known as "MCC". England won the Test series 2–0. The MCC team concluded its tour with four matches in Ceylon, two of them first-class.

It was England's first Test tour of India. Tours planned for 1930–31 and 1931–32 had been cancelled owing to civil unrest in India.

Overall, the team played 34 matches: three Tests, 15 other first-class matches, and 16 non-first-class matches.

== The English team ==
- Douglas Jardine (captain)
- Fred Bakewell
- Charlie Barnett
- Nobby Clark
- Harry Elliott
- Bob Gregory
- John Human
- James Langridge
- Hopper Levett
- Charles Marriott
- Arthur Mitchell
- Stan Nichols
- Leslie Townsend
- Bryan Valentine
- Hedley Verity
- Cyril Walters

Only Jardine and Verity had toured Australia in 1932–33.

== Test matches ==
=== 1st Test ===
15–18 December 1933
Scorecard

India	v	England
219 (91.2 overs); Lala Amarnath 38; James Langridge 3/42 (17 overs)		438 (136.5 overs); Bryan Valentine 136; Mohammad Nissar 5/90 (33.5 overs)
258 (90.5 overs); Lala Amarnath 118; Stan Nichols 5/55 (23.5 overs)		40/1 (7.2 overs); Charlie Barnett 17*; Amar Singh 1/15 (3.2 overs)

England won by 9 wickets
Gymkhana Ground, Bombay
Umpires: Bill Hitch and Frank Tarrant

- India won the toss and decided to bat.
- Arthur Mitchell and Bryan Valentine (both Eng), and Lala Amarnath, Ladha Ramji, L. P. Jai, Rustomji Jamshedji and Vijay Merchant (all Ind) made their Test debut.
- Lala Amarnath became the first Indian player to score an international century.

=== 2nd Test ===
5–8 January 1934
scorecard

England	v	India
403 (159.5 overs); James Langridge 70; Amar Singh 4/106 (54.5 overs)		247 (107.4 overs); Dilawar Hussain 59; Hedley Verity 4/64 (28.4 overs)
7/2 (5 overs); Bryan Valentine 3 Mohammad Nissar 1/2 (2 overs)		237 (f/o) (90.3 overs); Dilawar Hussain 57; Hedley Verity 4/76 (31 overs)

Match drawn
Eden Gardens, Calcutta
Umpires: JW Hitch, FA Tarrant

- England won the toss and decided to bat
- This was the first test match played at the Eden Gardens

=== 3rd Test ===
10–13 February 1934
scorecard

England	v	India
335 (131.4 overs); Fred Bakewell 85; Amar Singh 7/86 (44.4 overs)		145 (59.5 overs); Vijay Merchant 26; Hedley Verity 7/49 (23.5 overs)
261/7 d. (75.5 overs); Cyril Walters 102; Nazir Ali 4/83 (23 overs)		249 (69.2 overs); Yuvraj of Patiala 60; James Langridge 5/63 (24 overs)

England won by 202 runs
Madras Cricket Club Ground, Chepauk, Madras
Umpires: JB Higgins, JW Hitch

- England won the toss and decided to bat
