= Vijay Manjrekar =

Indian cricket player

Personal information
- Full name: Vijay Laxman Manjrekar
- Born: 26 September 1931; Bombay (now Mumbai), Bombay Presidency, British India (now in Maharashtra, India)
- Died: 18 October 1983 (aged 52); Madras (now Chennai), Tamil Nadu, India
- Batting: Right-handed
- Bowling: Right-arm offbreak
- Role: Batsman
- Relatives: Sanjay Manjrekar (son); Dattaram Hindlekar (uncle)

International information
- National side: India (1951–1965)
- Test debut (cap 59): 30 December 1951 v England
- Last Test: 27 February 1965 v New Zealand

Domestic team information
- Years: Team
- 1949–1956: Mumbai
- 1953–1954: Bengal
- 1957: Andhra
- 1957: Uttar Pradesh
- 1959–1966: Rajasthan
- 1966–1970: Maharashtra

Career statistics
Competition	Tests	First-class
Matches	55	198
Runs scored	3,208	12,832
Batting average	39.12	49.92
100s/50s	7/15	38/56
Top score	189*	283
Balls bowled	204	1,411
Wickets	1	20
Bowling average	44.00	32.85
5 wickets in innings	0	0
10 wickets in match	0	0
Best bowling	1/16	4/21
Catches/stumpings	19/2	72/6
- Source: ESPNcricinfo, 8 June 2019

Vijay Laxman Manjrekar (26 September 1931 – 18 October 1983) was an Indian cricketer who played 55 Tests. He represented several teams (Andhra, Bengal, Maharashtra, Mumbai, Rajasthan, and Uttar Pradesh) in his first-class career. A small man, he was a fine cutter and hooker of the ball. He is the father of Sanjay Manjrekar.

== Career ==
Manjrekar's Test match debut came against England at Calcutta in 1951, where he made a composed 48. He scored his first Test hundred in June 1952 against England at Headingley, making 133. It was his first Test in England and he was just 20 at the time. When he came in to bat his team was in trouble at 3/42 and faced a formidable lineup of bowlers in Fred Trueman, Alec Bedser and Jim Laker.

Manjrekar was part of the squad during India's tour of the Caribbean in 1952–53. Manjrekar finished the tour with three centuries, the most for India, with one coming off in the Fifth and final Test of the series against the West Indies. Having been promoted up the order to number three, Manjrekar reached 50 in 140 minutes. His next 50 runs came in 80 minutes. He put on a 237-run stand with opener Pankaj Roy for the second wicket, both playing attacking cricket, before the former was caught in the slips while playing a cut at 118. His innings included 15 fours. The match ended in a draw, resulting in the West Indies winning the Test series 1–0. Manjrekar finished 256 runs at 36.28. Overall, he was India's second best batsman in the tour in terms of numbers: he made 681 runs at 56.75. Reviewing his performance in the Test series, the Indian Express wrote, "Manjrekar, who had established himself as India's No. 3 batsman, was at is best against fast bowling and when King committed the indiscretion of bowling bumpers at him he rarely failed to hook them neatly to the boundary." In the next series, a tour to Pakistan in 1954–55, Manjrekar averaged 44.83 and made 269 runs in five Tests. In a tour that included other first-class games, he averaged 62.36 overall and made three centuries.

Manjrekar put on 222 with Vijay Hazare in an innings that suggested he would be a force to be reckoned with in the future. He would however fail to fulfill his early promise and faced problems with his weight and footwork. He eventually finished with a Test batting average of 39, a disappointment for a man capable of averaging well into the 40s. His finest series came against England in India 1961–62 when he made 586 runs at an average of 83.71. This included the highest score of his seven centuries, with 189 at Delhi. Another notable performance was in 1964–65 where his innings of 59 and 39 helped India to a Test victory over Australia. He scored a century in his final Test innings, against New Zealand at Madras in February 1965.

He held the record (subsequently beaten by Jonathan Trott) for the most Test runs scored (3,208) without hitting a six. He was among the four victims (others being Pankaj Roy, Dattajirao Gaekwad and Madhav Mantri) in India's miserable 0/4 start in the second innings of the Headingley Test of 1952 with Trueman playing havoc.

Manjrekar was also an occasional offspinner and occasional wicket-keeper.

He played for six teams in the Ranji Trophy, representing Bombay, Bengal, Uttar Pradesh, Rajasthan, Andhra Pradesh, and Maharashtra. He had a prolific career in the tournament, scoring 3,734 runs at an average of 57.44.

He died aged 52 in Madras on 18 October 1983.
