= List of India Test cricketers =

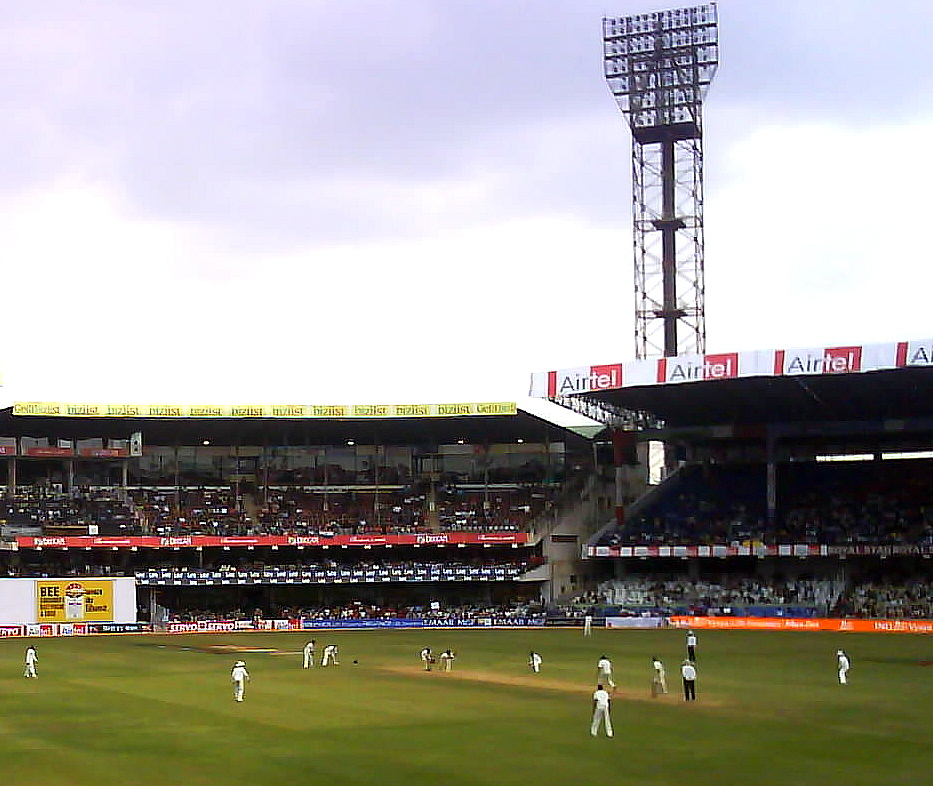
A Test match being played between India and Pakistan at M.Chinnaswamy Stadium, Bengaluru, India in 2007

This is a list of Indian Test cricketers. A Test match is an international cricket match between two of the leading cricketing nations. The list is arranged in the order in which each player won his Test cap. Where more than one player won his first Test cap in the same Test match, those players are listed alphabetically by surname.

== Players ==
Statistics are correct as of 26 November 2025.

Indian Test cricketers					Batting				Bowling				Fielding	
Cap	Name	First	Last	Mat	Runs	HS	Avg	100/50	Wkt	BBI	Ave	5/10 wicket	Ca	St
1	Amar Singh	1932	1936	7	292	51	22.46	0/1	28	7/86	30.64	2/0	3	0
2	Sorabji Colah	1932	1933	2	69	31	17.25	0/0	—	—	—	—/—	2	0
3	Jahangir Khan	1932	1936	4	39	13	5.57	0/0	4	4/60	63.75	0/0	4	0
4	Lall Singh	1932	1932	1	44	29	22.00	0/0	—	—	—	—/—	1	0
5	Naoomal Jeoomal	1932	1934	3	108	43	27.00	0/0	2	1/4	34.00	0/0	0	0
6	Janardan Navle	1932	1933	2	42	13	10.50	0/0	—	—	—	—/—	1	0
7	C. K. Nayudu	1932	1936	7	350	81	25.00	0/2	9	3/40	42.88	0/0	4	0
8	Nazir Ali	1932	1934	2	30	13	7.50	0/0	4	4/83	20.75	0/0	0	0
9	Mohammad Nissar	1932	1936	6	55	14	6.87	0/0	25	5/90	28.28	3/0	2	0
10	Phiroze Palia	1932	1936	2	29	16	9.66	0/0	0	—	—	0/0	0	0
11	Wazir Ali	1932	1936	7	237	42	16.92	0/0	0	—	—	0/0	1	0
12	Lala Amarnath	1933	1952	24	878	118	24.38	1/4	45	5/96	32.91	2/0	13	0
13	L. P. Jai	1933	1933	1	19	19	9.50	0/0	—	—	—	—/—	0	0
14	Rustomji Jamshedji	1933	1933	1	5	4*	—	0/0	3	3/137	45.66	0/0	2	0
15	Vijay Merchant	1933	1951	10	859	154	47.72	3/3	0	—	—	0/0	7	0
16	Ladha Ramji	1933	1933	1	1	1	0.50	0/0	0	—	—	0/0	1	0
17	Dilawar Hussain	1934	1936	3	254	59	42.33	0/3	—	—	—	—/—	6	1
18	M. J. Gopalan	1934	1934	1	18	11*	18.00	0/0	1	1/39	39.00	0/0	3	0
19	Mushtaq Ali	1934	1952	11	612	112	32.21	2/3	3	1/45	67.33	0/0	7	0
20	C. S. Nayudu	1934	1952	11	147	36	9.18	0/0	2	1/19	179.50	0/0	3	0
21	Yadavindra Singh	1934	1934	1	84	60	42.00	0/1	—	—	—	—/—	2	0
22	Dattaram Hindlekar	1936	1946	4	71	26	14.20	0/0	—	—	—	—/—	3	0
23	Vijay Ananda Gajapathi Raju	1936	1936	3	33	19*	8.25	0/0	—	—	—	—/—	1	0
24	Khershed Meherhomji	1936	1936	1	0	0*	—	0/0	—	—	—	—/—	1	0
25	Cotah Ramaswami	1936	1936	2	170	60	56.66	0/1	—	—	—	—/—	0	0
26	Baqa Jilani	1936	1936	1	16	12	16.00	0/0	0	—	—	0/0	0	0
27	Gul Mohammad (Note: Gul Mohammad's name is sometimes recorded as Gul Mahomed.)	1946	1952	8 (Note: Amir Elahi, Abdul Hafeez and Gul Mohammad also played for Pakistan. Only their records for India are listed here.)	166	34	11.06	0/0	2	2/21	12.00	0/0	3	0
28	Vijay Hazare	1946	1953	30	2192	164*	47.65	7/9	20	4/29	61.00	0/0	11	0
29	Abdul Hafeez (Note: Abdul Hafeez played cricket for Pakistan under the name Abdul Hafeez Kardar.)	1946	1946	3	80	43	16.00	0/0	—	—	—	—/—	0	0
30	Vinoo Mankad	1946	1959	44	2109	231	31.47	5/6	162	8/52	32.32	8/2	33	0
31	Rusi Modi	1946	1952	10	736	112	46.00	1/6	0	—	—	0/0	3	0
32	Nawab of Pataudi Sr	1946	1946	3 (Note: Nawab of Pataudi Sr also played for England. Only his records for India are listed here.)	55	22	11.00	0/0	—	—	—	—/—	1	0
33	Sadashiv Shinde	1946	1952	7	85	14	14.16	0/0	12	6/91	59.75	1/0	0	0
34	Chandu Sarwate	1946	1951	9	208	37	13.00	0/0	3	1/16	124.66	0/0	0	0
35	Ranga Sohoni	1946	1951	4	83	29*	16.60	0/0	2	1/16	101.00	0/0	2	0
36	Hemu Adhikari	1947	1959	21	872	114*	31.14	1/4	3	3/68	27.33	0/0	8	0
37	Jenni Irani	1947	1947	2	3	2*	3.00	0/0	—	—	—	—/—	2	1
38	Gogumal Kishenchand	1947	1952	5	89	44	8.90	0/0	—	—	—	—/—	1	0
39	Khandu Rangnekar	1947	1948	3	33	18	5.50	0/0	—	—	—	—/—	1	0
40	Amir Elahi	1947	1947	1	17	13	8.50	0/0	—	—	—	—/—	0	0
41	Dattu Phadkar	1947	1959	31	1229	123	32.34	2/8	62	7/159	36.85	3/0	21	0
42	Kanwar Rai Singh	1948	1948	1	26	24	13.00	0/0	—	—	—	—/—	0	0
43	Probir Sen	1948	1952	14	165	25	11.78	0/0	—	—	—	—/—	20	11
44	C. R. Rangachari	1948	1948	4	8	8*	2.66	0/0	9	5/107	54.77	1/0	0	0
45	Khanmohammad Ibrahim	1948	1949	4	169	85	21.12	0/1	—	—	—	—/—	0	0
46	Keki Tarapore	1948	1948	1	2	2	2.00	0/0	0	—	—	0/0	0	0
47	Polly Umrigar	1948	1962	59	3631	223	42.22	12/14	35	6/74	42.08	2/0	33	0
48	Montu Banerjee	1949	1949	1	0	0	0.00	0/0	5	4/120	36.20	0/0	3	0
49	Ghulam Ahmed	1949	1959	22	192	50	8.72	0/1	68	7/49	30.17	4/1	11	0
50	Nirode Chowdhury	1949	1951	2	3	3*	3.00	0/0	1	1/130	205.00	0/0	0	0
51	Madhusudan Rege	1949	1949	1	15	15	7.50	0/0	—	—	—	—/—	1	0
52	Shute Banerjee	1949	1949	1	13	8	6.50	0/0	5	4/54	25.40	0/0	0	0
53	Nana Joshi	1951	1960	12	207	52*	10.89	0/1	—	—	—	—/—	18	9
54	Pankaj Roy	1951	1960	43	2442	173	32.56	5/9	1	1/6	66.00	0/0	16	0
55	C. D. Gopinath	1951	1960	8	242	50*	22.00	0/1	1	1/11	11.00	0/0	2	0
56	Madhav Mantri	1951	1955	4	67	39	9.57	0/0	—	—	—	—/—	8	1
57	Buck Divecha	1952	1952	5	60	26	12.00	0/0	11	3/102	32.81	0/0	5	0
58	Subhash Gupte	1952	1961	36	183	21	6.31	0/0	149	9/102	29.55	12/1	14	0
59	Vijay Manjrekar	1952	1965	55	3208	189*	39.12	7/15	1	1/16	44.00	0/0	19	2
60	Datta Gaekwad	1952	1961	11	350	52	18.42	0/1	0	—	—	0/0	5	0
61	Gulabrai Ramchand	1952	1960	33	1180	109	24.58	2/5	41	6/49	46.31	1/0	20	0
62	Hiralal Gaekwad	1952	1952	1	22	14	11.00	0/0	0	—	—	0/0	0	0
63	Shah Nyalchand	1952	1952	1	7	6*	7.00	0/0	3	3/97	32.33	0/0	0	0
64	Madhav Apte	1952	1953	7	542	163*	49.27	1/3	0	—	—	0/0	2	0
65	Bal Dani	1952	1952	1	—	—	—	—/—	1	1/9	19.00	0/0	1	0
66	Vijay Rajindernath	1952	1952	1	—	—	—	—/—	—	—	—	—/—	0	4
67	Ebrahim Maka	1952	1953	2	2	2*	—	0/0	—	—	—	—/—	2	1
68	Deepak Shodhan	1952	1953	3	181	110	60.33	1/0	0	—	—	0/0	1	0
69	Chandrasekhar Gadkari	1953	1955	6	129	50*	21.50	0/1	0	—	—	0/0	6	0
70	Jayasinghrao Ghorpade	1953	1959	8	229	41	15.26	0/0	0	—	—	0/0	4	0
71	Pananmal Punjabi	1955	1955	5	164	33	16.40	0/0	—	—	—	—/—	5	0
72	Naren Tamhane	1955	1961	21	225	54*	10.22	0/1	—	—	—	—/—	35	16
73	Prakash Bhandari	1955	1956	3	77	39	19.25	0/0	0	—	—	0/0	1	0
74	Jasu Patel	1955	1960	7	25	12	2.77	0/0	29	9/69	21.96	2/1	2	0
75	A. G. Kripal Singh	1955	1964	14	422	100*	28.13	1/2	10	3/43	58.40	0/0	4	0
76	Narain Swamy	1955	1955	1	—	—	—	—/—	0	—	—	0/0	0	0
77	Nari Contractor	1955	1962	31	1611	108	31.58	1/11	1	1/9	80.00	0/0	18	0
78	Vijay Mehra	1955	1964	8	329	62	25.30	0/2	0	—	—	0/0	1	0
79	Sadashiv Patil	1955	1955	1	14	14*	—	0/0	2	1/15	25.50	0/0	1	0
80	Bapu Nadkarni	1955	1968	41	1414	122*	25.70	1/7	88	6/43	29.07	4/1	22	0
81	Gundibail Sunderam	1955	1956	2	3	3*	—	0/0	3	2/46	55.33	0/0	0	0
82	Chandrakant Patankar	1956	1956	1	14	13	14.00	0/0	—	—	—	—/—	3	1
83	Chandu Borde	1958	1969	55	3061	177*	35.59	5/18	52	5/88	46.48	1/0	37	0
84	Ghulam Guard	1958	1960	2	11	7	5.50	0/0	3	2/69	60.66	0/0	2	0
85	Manohar Hardikar	1958	1958	2	56	32*	18.66	0/0	1	1/9	55.00	0/0	3	0
86	Vasant Ranjane	1958	1964	7	40	16	6.66	0/0	19	4/72	34.15	0/0	1	0
87	Ramnath Kenny	1959	1960	5	245	62	27.22	0/3	—	—	—	—/—	1	0
88	Surendranath	1959	1961	11	136	27	10.46	0/0	26	5/75	40.50	2/0	4	0
89	Apoorva Sengupta	1959	1959	1	9	8	4.50	0/0	—	—	—	—/—	0	0
90	Ramakant Desai	1959	1968	28	418	85	13.48	0/1	74	6/56	37.31	2/0	9	0
91	M. L. Jaisimha	1959	1971	39	2056	129	30.68	3/12	9	2/54	92.11	0/0	17	0
92	Arvind Apte	1959	1959	1	15	8	7.50	0/0	—	—	—	—/—	0	0
93	Abbas Ali Baig	1959	1967	10	428	112	23.77	1/2	0	—	—	0/0	6	0
94	V. M. Muddiah	1959	1960	2	11	11	5.50	0/0	3	2/40	44.66	0/0	0	0
95	Salim Durani	1960	1973	29	1202	104	25.04	1/7	75	6/73	35.42	3/1	14	0
96	Budhi Kunderan	1960	1967	18	981	192	32.70	2/3	0	—	—	0/0	23	7
97	A. G. Milkha Singh	1960	1961	4	92	35	15.33	0/0	0	—	—	0/0	2	0
98	Man Sood	1960	1960	1	3	3	1.50	0/0	—	—	—	—/—	0	0
99	Rusi Surti	1960	1969	26	1263	99	28.70	0/9	42	5/74	46.71	1/0	26	0
100	Baloo Gupte	1961	1965	3	28	17*	28.00	0/0	3	1/54	116.33	0/0	0	0
101	Vaman Kumar	1961	1961	2	6	6	3.00	0/0	7	5/64	28.85	1/0	2	0
102	Farokh Engineer	1961	1975	46	2611	121	31.08	2/16	—	—	—	—/—	66	16
103	Dilip Sardesai	1961	1972	30	2001	212	39.23	5/9	0	—	—	0/0	4	0
104	Mansoor Ali Khan Pataudi	1961	1975	46	2793	203*	34.91	6/16	1	1/10	88.00	0/0	27	0
105	E. A. S. Prasanna	1962	1978	49	735	37	11.48	0/0	189	8/76	30.38	10/2	18	0
106	B. S. Chandrasekhar	1964	1979	58	167	22	4.07	0/0	242	8/79	29.74	16/2	25	0
107	Rajinder Pal	1964	1964	1	6	3*	6.00	0/0	0	—	—	0/0	0	0
108	Hanumant Singh	1964	1969	14	686	105	31.18	1/5	0	—	—	0/0	11	0
109	Kumar Indrajitsinhji	1964	1969	4	51	23	8.50	0/0	—	—	—	—/—	6	3
110	Srinivas Venkataraghavan	1965	1983	57	748	64	11.68	0/2	156	8/72	36.11	3/1	44	0
111	Venkataraman Subramanya	1965	1968	9	263	75	18.78	0/2	3	2/32	67.00	0/0	9	0
112	Ajit Wadekar	1966	1974	37	2113	143	31.07	1/14	0	—	—	0/0	46	0
113	Bishan Singh Bedi	1967	1979	67	656	50*	8.98	0/1	266	7/98	28.71	14/1	26	0
114	Subrata Guha	1967	1969	4	17	6	3.40	0/0	3	2/55	103.66	0/0	2	0
115	Ramesh Saxena	1967	1967	1	25	16	12.50	0/0	0	—	—	0/0	0	0
116	Abid Ali	1967	1974	29	1018	81	20.36	0/6	47	6/55	42.12	1/0	32	0
117	Umesh Kulkarni	1967	1968	4	13	7	4.33	0/0	5	2/37	47.60	0/0	0	0
118	Chetan Chauhan	1969	1981	40	2084	97	31.57	0/16	2	1/4	53.00	0/0	38	0
119	Ashok Mankad	1969	1978	22	991	97	25.41	0/6	0	—	—	0/0	12	0
120	Ajit Pai	1969	1969	1	10	9	5.00	0/0	2	2/29	15.50	0/0	0	0
121	Ambar Roy	1969	1969	4	91	48	13.00	0/0	—	—	—	—/—	0	0
122	Ashok Gandotra	1969	1969	2	54	18	13.50	0/0	0	—	—	0/0	1	0
123	Eknath Solkar	1969	1977	27	1068	102	25.42	1/6	18	3/28	59.44	0/0	53	0
124	Gundappa Viswanath	1969	1983	91	6080	222	41.93	14/35	1	1/11	46.00	0/0	63	0
125	Mohinder Amarnath	1969	1988	69	4378	138	42.50	11/24	32	4/63	55.68	0/0	47	0
126	Kenia Jayantilal	1971	1971	1	5	5	5.00	0/0	—	—	—	—/—	0	0
127	Pochiah Krishnamurthy	1971	1971	5	33	20	5.50	0/0	—	—	—	—/—	7	1
128	Sunil Gavaskar	1971	1987	125	10122	236*	51.12	34/45	1	1/34	206.00	0/0	108	0
129	Ramnath Parkar	1972	1973	2	80	35	20.00	0/0	—	—	—	—/—	0	0
130	Madan Lal	1974	1986	39	1042	74	22.65	0/5	71	5/23	40.08	4/0	15	0
131	Brijesh Patel	1974	1977	21	972	115*	29.45	1/5	—	—	—	—/—	17	0
132	Sudhir Naik	1974	1975	3	141	77	23.50	0/1	—	—	—	—/—	0	0
133	Hemant Kanitkar	1974	1974	2	111	65	27.75	0/1	—	—	—	—/—	0	0
134	Parthasarathy Sharma	1974	1977	5	187	54	18.70	0/1	0	—	—	0/0	1	0
135	Anshuman Gaekwad	1975	1985	40	1985	201	30.07	2/10	2	1/4	93.50	0/0	15	0
136	Karsan Ghavri	1975	1981	39	913	86	21.23	0/2	109	5/33	33.54	4/0	16	0
137	Surinder Amarnath	1976	1978	10	550	124	30.55	1/3	1	1/5	5.00	0/0	4	0
138	Syed Kirmani	1976	1986	88	2759	102	27.04	2/12	1	1/9	13.00	0/0	160	38
139	Dilip Vengsarkar	1976	1992	116	6868	166	42.13	17/35	0	—	—	0/0	78	0
140	Yajurvindra Singh	1977	1979	4	109	43*	18.16	0/0	0	—	—	0/0	11	0
141	Kapil Dev	1978	1994	131	5248	163	31.05	8/27	434	9/83	29.64	23/2	64	0
142	M. V. Narasimha Rao	1979	1979	4	46	20*	9.20	0/0	3	2/46	75.66	0/0	8	0
143	Dhiraj Parsana	1979	1979	2	1	1	0.50	0/0	1	1/32	50.00	0/0	0	0
144	Bharath Reddy	1979	1979	4	38	21	9.50	0/0	—	—	—	—/—	9	2
145	Yashpal Sharma	1979	1983	37	1606	140	33.45	2/9	1	1/6	17.00	0/0	16	0
146	Dilip Doshi	1979	1983	33	129	20	4.60	0/0	114	6/102	30.71	6/0	10	0
147	Shivlal Yadav	1979	1987	35	403	43	14.39	0/0	102	5/76	35.09	3/0	10	0
148	Roger Binny	1979	1987	27	830	83*	23.05	0/5	47	6/56	32.63	2/0	11	0
149	Sandeep Patil	1980	1984	29	1588	174	36.93	4/7	9	2/28	26.66	0/0	12	0
150	Kirti Azad	1981	1983	7	135	24	11.25	0/0	3	2/84	124.33	0/0	3	0
151	Ravi Shastri	1981	1992	80	3830	206	35.79	11/12	151	5/75	40.96	2/0	36	0
152	Yograj Singh	1981	1981	1	10	6	5.00	0/0	1	1/63	63.00	0/0	0	0
153	T. E. Srinivasan	1981	1981	1	48	29	24.00	0/0	—	—	—	—/—	0	0
154	Krishnamachari Srikkanth	1981	1992	43	2062	123	29.88	2/12	0	—	—	0/0	40	0
155	Ashok Malhotra	1982	1985	7	226	72*	25.11	0/1	0	—	—	0/0	2	0
156	Pranab Roy	1982	1982	2	71	60*	35.50	0/1	—	—	—	—/—	1	0
157	Ghulam Parkar	1982	1982	1	7	6	3.50	0/0	—	—	—	—/—	1	0
158	Suru Nayak	1982	1982	2	19	11	9.50	0/0	1	1/16	132.00	0/0	1	0
159	Arun Lal	1982	1989	16	729	93	26.03	0/6	0	—	—	0/0	13	0
160	Rakesh Shukla	1982	1982	1	—	—	—	—/—	2	2/82	76.00	0/0	0	0
161	Maninder Singh	1982	1993	35	99	15	3.80	0/0	88	7/27	37.36	3/2	9	0
162	Balwinder Sandhu	1983	1983	8	214	71	30.57	0/2	10	3/87	55.70	0/0	1	0
163	T. A. Sekhar	1983	1983	2	0	0*	—	0/0	0	—	—	0/0	0	0
164	Laxman Sivaramakrishnan	1983	1986	9	130	25	16.25	0/0	26	6/64	44.03	3/1	9	0
165	Raghuram Bhat	1983	1983	2	6	6	3.00	0/0	4	2/65	37.75	0/0	0	0
166	Navjot Singh Sidhu	1983	1999	51	3202	201	42.13	9/15	0	—	—	0/0	9	0
167	Chetan Sharma	1984	1989	23	396	54	22.00	0/1	61	6/58	35.45	4/1	7	0
168	Manoj Prabhakar	1984	1995	39	1600	120	32.65	1/9	96	6/132	37.30	3/0	20	0
169	Mohammad Azharuddin	1985	2000	99	6215	199	45.03	22/21	0	—	—	0/0	105	0
170	Gopal Sharma	1985	1990	5	11	10*	3.66	0/0	10	4/88	41.80	0/0	2	0
171	Lalchand Rajput	1985	1985	2	105	61	26.25	0/1	—	—	—	—/—	1	0
172	Sadanand Viswanath	1985	1985	3	31	20	6.20	0/0	—	—	—	—/—	11	0
173	Kiran More	1986	1993	49	1285	73	25.70	0/7	0	—	—	0/0	110	20
174	Chandrakant Pandit	1986	1992	5	171	39	24.42	0/0	—	—	—	—/—	14	2
175	Raju Kulkarni	1986	1987	3	2	2	1.00	0/0	5	3/85	45.40	0/0	1	0
176	Bharat Arun	1986	1987	2	4	2*	4.00	0/0	4	3/76	29.00	0/0	2	0
177	Raman Lamba	1986	1987	4	102	53	20.40	0/1	—	—	—	—/—	5	0
178	Arshad Ayub	1987	1989	13	257	57	17.13	0/1	41	5/50	35.07	3/0	2	0
179	Sanjay Manjrekar	1987	1996	37	2043	218	37.14	4/9	0	—	—	0/0	25	1
180	Narendra Hirwani	1988	1996	17	54	17	5.40	0/0	66	8/61	30.10	4/1	5	0
181	Woorkeri Raman	1988	1997	11	448	96	24.88	0/4	2	1/7	64.50	0/0	6	0
182	Ajay Sharma	1988	1988	1	53	30	26.50	0/0	0	—	—	0/0	1	0
183	Rashid Patel	1988	1988	1	0	0	0.00	0/0	0	—	—	0/0	1	0
184	Sanjeev Sharma	1988	1990	2	56	38	28.00	0/0	6	3/37	41.16	0/0	1	0
185	M. Venkataramana	1989	1989	1	0	0*	—	0/0	1	1/10	58.00	0/0	1	0
186	Salil Ankola	1989	1989	1	6	6	6.00	0/0	2	1/35	64.00	0/0	0	0
187	Sachin Tendulkar	1989	2013	200	15921	248*	53.86	51/68	45	3/10	54.64	0/0	115	0
188	Vivek Razdan	1989	1989	2	6	6*	6.00	0/0	5	5/79	28.20	1/0	0	0
189	Venkatapathy Raju	1990	2001	28	240	31	10.00	0/0	93	6/12	30.72	5/1	6	0
190	Atul Wassan	1990	1990	4	94	53	23.50	0/1	10	4/108	50.40	0/0	1	0
191	Gursharan Singh	1990	1990	1	18	18	18.00	0/0	—	—	—	—/—	2	0
192	Anil Kumble	1990	2008	132	2506	110*	17.77	1/5	619	10/74	29.65	35/8	60	0
193	Javagal Srinath	1991	2002	67	1009	76	14.21	0/4	236	8/86	30.49	10/1	22	0
194	Subroto Banerjee	1992	1992	1	3	3	3.00	0/0	3	3/47	15.66	0/0	0	0
195	Pravin Amre	1992	1993	11	425	103	42.50	1/3	—	—	—	—/—	9	0
196	Ajay Jadeja	1992	2000	15	576	96	26.18	0/4	—	—	—	—/—	5	0
197	Rajesh Chauhan	1993	1998	21	98	23	7.00	0/0	47	4/48	39.51	0/0	12	0
198	Vinod Kambli	1993	1995	17	1084	227	54.20	4/3	—	—	—	—/—	7	0
199	Vijay Yadav	1993	1993	1	30	30	30.00	0/0	—	—	—	—/—	1	2
200	Nayan Mongia	1994	2001	44	1442	152	24.03	1/6	G| —	—	—/—	99	8	
201	Aashish Kapoor	1994	1996	4	97	42	19.40	0/0	6	2/19	42.50	0/0	1	0
202	Sunil Joshi	1996	2000	15	352	92	20.70	0/1	41	5/142	35.85	1/0	7	0
203	Paras Mhambrey	1996	1996	2	58	28	29.00	0/0	2	1/43	74.00	0/0	1	0
204	Venkatesh Prasad	1996	2001	33	203	30*	7.51	0/0	96	6/33	35.00	7/1	6	0
205	Vikram Rathour	1996	1997	6	131	44	13.10	0/0	—	—	—	—/—	12	0
206	Sourav Ganguly	1996	2008	113	7212	239	42.17	16/35	32	3/28	52.53	0/0	71	0
207	Rahul Dravid	1996	2012	163 (Note: Rahul Dravid and Virender Sehwag also played for ICC World XI. Only their records for India are listed here.)	13265	270	52.63	36/63	1	1/18	39.00	0/0	209	0
208	David Johnson	1996	1996	2	8	5	4.00	0/0	3	2/52	47.66	0/0	0	0
209	V. V. S. Laxman	1996	2012	134	8781	281	45.97	17/56	2	1/2	63.00	0/0	135	0
210	Dodda Ganesh	1997	1997	4	25	8	6.25	0/0	5	2/28	57.40	0/0	0	0
211	Abey Kuruvilla	1997	1997	10	66	35*	6.60	0/0	25	5/68	35.68	1/0	0	0
212	Nilesh Kulkarni	1997	2001	3	5	4	5.00	0/0	2	1/70	166.00	0/0	1	0
213	Debashish Mohanty	1997	1997	2	0	0*	G| — |G| — |G| —	0/0	4	4/78	59.75	0/0	0	0
215	Harbhajan Singh	1998	2015	103	2224	115	18.22	2/9	417	8/84	32.46	25/5	42	0
214	Harvinder Singh	1998	2001	3	6	6	2.00	0/0	4	2/62	46.25	0/0	0	0
216	Ajit Agarkar	1998	2006	26	571	109*	16.79	1/0	58	6/41	47.32	1/0	6	0
217	Robin Singh	1998	1998	1	27	15	13.50	0/0	0	—	—	0/0	5	0
218	Robin Singh, Jr.	1999	1999	1	0	0	0.00	0/0	3	2/74	58.66	0/0	1	0
219	Sadagoppan Ramesh	1999	2001	19	1367	143	37.97	2/8	0	—	—	0/0	18	0
220	Ashish Nehra	1999	2004	17	77	19	5.50	0/0	44	4/72	42.40	0/0	5	0
221	Devang Gandhi	1999	1999	4	204	88	34.00	0/2	—	—	—	—/—	3	0
222	MSK Prasad	1999	2000	6	106	19	11.77	0/0	—	—	—	—/—	15	0
223	Vijay Bharadwaj	1999	2000	3	28	22	9.33	0/0	1	1/26	107.00	0/0	3	0
224	Hrishikesh Kanitkar	1999	2000	2	74	45	18.50	0/0	0	—	—	0/0	0	0
225	Wasim Jaffer	2000	2008	31	1944	212	34.10	5/11	2	2/18	9.00	0/0	27	0
226	Murali Kartik	2000	2004	8	88	43	9.77	0/0	24	4/44	34.16	0/0	2	0
227	Nikhil Chopra	2000	2000	1	7	4	3.50	0/0	0	—	—	0/0	0	0
228	Mohammad Kaif	2000	2006	13	624	148*	32.84	1/3	0	—	—	0/0	14	0
229	Shiv Sunder Das	2000	2002	23	1326	110	34.89	2/9	0	—	—	0/0	34	0
230	Saba Karim	2000	2000	1	15	15	15.00	0/0	—	—	—	—/—	1	0
231	Zaheer Khan	2000	2014	92	1231	75	11.95	0/3	311	7/87	32.94	10/1	19	0
232	Vijay Dahiya	2000	2000	2	2	2*	—	0/0	—	—	—	—/—	6	0
233	Sarandeep Singh	2000	2002	3	43	39*	43.00	0/0	10	4/136	34.00	0/0	1	0
234	Rahul Sanghvi	2001	2001	1	2	2	1.00	0/0	2	2/67	39.00	0/0	0	0
235	Sairaj Bahutule	2001	2001	2	39	21*	13.00	0/0	3	1/32	67.66	0/0	1	0
236	Sameer Dighe	2001	2001	6	141	47	15.66	0/0	—	—	—	—/—	12	2
237	Hemang Badani	2001	2001	4	94	38	15.66	0/0	0	—	—	0/0	6	0
238	Deep Dasgupta	2001	2002	8	344	100	28.66	1/2	—	—	—	—/—	13	0
239	Virender Sehwag	2001	2013	103	8503	319	49.43	23/31	40	5/104	47.35	1/0	90	0
240	Sanjay Bangar	2001	2002	12	470	100*	29.37	1/3	7	2/23	49.00	0/0	4	0
241	Iqbal Siddiqui	2001	2001	1	29	24	29.00	0/0	1	1/32	48.00	0/0	1	0
242	Tinu Yohannan	2001	2002	3	13	8*	—	0/0	5	2/56	51.20	0/0	1	0
243	Ajay Ratra	2002	2002	6	163	115*	18.11	1/0	0	—	—	0/0	11	2
244	Parthiv Patel	2002	2018	25	934	71	31.13	0/6	—	—	—	—/—	62	10
245	Lakshmipathy Balaji	2003	2005	8	51	31	5.66	0/0	27	5/76	37.18	1/0	1	0
246	Aakash Chopra	2003	2004	10	437	60	23.00	0/2	—	—	—	—/—	15	0
247	Yuvraj Singh	2003	2012	40	1900	169	33.92	3/11	9	2/9	60.77	0/0	31	0
248	Irfan Pathan	2003	2008	29	1105	102	31.57	1/6	100	7/59	32.26	7/2	8	0
249	Gautam Gambhir	2004	2016	58	4154	206	41.95	9/22	—	—	—	—/—	38	0
250	Dinesh Karthik	2004	2018	26	1025	129	25.00	1/7	—	—	—	—/—	57	6
251	MS Dhoni	2005	2014	90	4876	224	38.09	6/33	0	—	—	0/0	256	38
252	R. P. Singh	2006	2011	14	116	30	7.25	0/0	40	5/59	42.05	1/0	6	0
253	S. Sreesanth	2006	2011	27	281	35	10.40	0/0	87	5/40	37.59	3/0	5	0
254	Piyush Chawla	2006	2012	3	5	4	2.50	0/0	3	2/66	45.66	0/0	0	0
255	Munaf Patel	2006	2011	13	60	15*	7.50	0/0	35	4/25	38.54	0/0	6	0
256	V. R. V. Singh	2006	2007	5	47	29	11.75	0/0	8	3/48	53.37	0/0	1	0
257	Ramesh Powar	2007	2007	2	13	7	6.50	0/0	6	3/33	19.66	0/0	0	0
258	Ishant Sharma	2007	2021	105	785	57	8.26	0/1	311	7/74	32.40	11/1	23	0
259	Amit Mishra	2008	2016	22	648	84	21.60	0/4	76	5/71	35.72	1/0	8	0
260	Murali Vijay	2008	2018	61	3982	167	38.28	12/15	1	1/12	198.00	0/0	49	0
261	Pragyan Ojha	2009	2013	24	89	18*	17.80	0/0	113	6/47	30.27	7/1	10	0
262	Subramaniam Badrinath	2010	2010	2	63	56	21.00	0/1	—	—	—	—/—	0	0
263	Wriddhiman Saha	2010	2021	40	1353	117	29.41	3/6	—	—	—	—/—	92	12
264	Abhimanyu Mithun	2010	2011	4	120	46	24.00	0/0	9	4/105	50.66	0/0	0	0
265	Suresh Raina	2010	2015	18	768	120	26.48	1/7	13	2/1	46.38	0/0	23	0
266	Cheteshwar Pujara	2010	2023	103	7195	206*	43.60	19/35	0	—	—	0/0	66	0
267	Jaydev Unadkat	2010	2023	4	36	14*	12.00	0/0	3	2/50	77.00	0/0	3	0
268 (Note: Abhinav Mukund, Virat Kohli and Praveen Kumar all made their debut in the same match against the West Indies in 2011. ESPNcricinfo lists their cap numbers alphabetically by surname, however their correct designated numbers are 268, 269 and 270, respectively.)	Abhinav Mukund	2011	2017	7	320	81	22.85	0/2	—	—	—	0/0	6	0
269	Virat Kohli	2011	2025	123	9230	254*	46.85	30/31	0	—	—	0/0	121	0
270	Praveen Kumar	2011	2011	6	149	40	14.90	0/0	27	5/106	25.81	1/0	2	0
271	Ravichandran Ashwin	2011	2024	106	3503	124	25.75	5/14	537	7/59	24.00	37/8	36	0
272	Umesh Yadav	2011	2023	57	460	31	11.21	0/0	170	6/88	30.95	3/1	19	0
273	Varun Aaron	2011	2015	9	35	9	3.88	0/0	18	3/97	52.61	0/0	1	0
274	Vinay Kumar	2012	2012	1	11	6	5.50	0/0	1	1/73	73	0/0	0	0
275	Ravindra Jadeja	2012	2025	89	4095	175*	38.27	6/28	348	7/42	25.11	15/3	49	0
276	Bhuvneshwar Kumar	2013	2018	21	552	63*	22.08	0/3	63	6/82	26.09	4/0	8	0
277	Shikhar Dhawan	2013	2018	34	2315	190	40.61	7/5	0	—	—	0/0	28	0
278	Ajinkya Rahane	2013	2023	85	5077	188	38.46	12/26	—	—	—	—/—	102	0
279	Mohammed Shami	2013	2023	64	750	56*	12.09	0/2	229	6/56	27.71	6/0	16	0
280	Rohit Sharma	2013	2024	67	4301	212	40.57	12/18	2	1/26	112.00	0/0	68	0
281	Stuart Binny	2014	2015	6	194	78	21.55	0/1	3	2/24	86.00	0/0	4	0
282	Pankaj Singh	2014	2014	2	10	9	3.33	0/0	2	2/113	146.00	0/0	2	0
283	Karn Sharma	2014	2014	1	8	4*	8.00	0/0	4	2/95	59.50	0/0	0	0
284	KL Rahul	2014	2026	68	4153	199	36.43	12/20	—	—	—	—/—	85	0
285	Naman Ojha	2015	2015	1	56	35	28.00	0/0	—	—	—	—/—	4	1
286	Jayant Yadav	2016	2022	6	248	104	31.00	1/1	16	4/49	29.06	0/0	3	0
287	Karun Nair	2016	2025	10	579	303*	41.35	1/1	0	—	—	0/0	10	0
288	Kuldeep Yadav	2017	2026	18	234	40	12.32	0/0	79	5/40	22.35	5/0	6	0
289	Hardik Pandya	2017	2018	11	532	108	31.29	1/4	17	5/28	31.05	1/0	7	0
290	Jasprit Bumrah	2018	2025	52	348	34*	6.56	0/0	234	6/27	19.79	16/0	17	0
291	Rishabh Pant	2018	2026	50	3557	159*	43.38	8/19	—	—	—	—/—	162	16
292	Hanuma Vihari	2018	2022	16	839	111	33.56	1/5	5	3/37	36.00	0/0	4	0
293	Prithvi Shaw	2018	2020	5	339	134	42.37	1/2	—	—	—	—/—	2	0
294	Shardul Thakur	2018	2025	13	377	67	18.85	0/4	33	7/61	31.03	1/0	6	0
295	Mayank Agarwal	2018	2022	21	1488	243	41.33	4/6	—	—	—	—/—	14	0
296	Shahbaz Nadeem	2019	2021	2	1	1*	0.50	0/0	8	2/18	34.12	0/0	1	0
297	Shubman Gill	2020	2026	41	2969	269	43.66	11/8	0	—	—	—/—	31	0
298	Mohammed Siraj	2020	2026	46	176	22	4.89	0/0	140	6/15	29.74	5/0	23	0
299	Navdeep Saini	2021	2021	2	8	5	4.00	0/0	4	2/54	43.00	0/0	1	0
300	Thangarasu Natarajan	2021	2021	1	1	1*	—	—/—	3	3/78	39.66	0/0	0	0
301	Washington Sundar	2021	2026	18	937	101*	44.62	1/6	41	7/59	30.34	1/1	6	0
302	Axar Patel	2021	2025	15	688	84	34.40	0/4	57	6/38	19.66	5/1	4	0
303	Shreyas Iyer	2021	2024	14	811	105	36.86	1/5	0	—	—	0/0	15	0
304	K.S. Bharat	2023	2024	7	221	44	20.09	0/0	—	—	—	—/—	18	1
305	Suryakumar Yadav	2023	2023	1	8	8	8.00	0/0	—	—	—	—/—	19	0
306	Yashasvi Jaiswal	2023	2026	29	2535	214*	48.75	7/13	0	—	—	—/—	25	0
307	Ishan Kishan	2023	2023	2	78	52*	78.00	0/1	—	—	—	—/—	5	0
308	Mukesh Kumar	2023	2024	3	0	0*	—	0/0	7	2/0	25.57	0/0	0	0
309	Prasidh Krishna	2023	2026	7	10	5*	2.00	0/0	25	4/62	31.96	0/0	2	0
310	Rajat Patidar	2024	2024	3	63	32	10.50	0/0	—	—	—	—	4	0
311	Sarfaraz Khan	2024	2024	6	371	150	37.10	0/3	—	—	—	—	3	0
312	Dhruv Jurel	2024	2026	10	478	125	34.14	1/1	—	—	—	—	17	2
313	Akash Deep	2024	2025	10	163	66	11.64	0/1	28	6/99	35.78	1/1	2	0
314	Devdutt Paddikal	2024	2024	2	90	65	30.00	0/1	—	—	—	—	2	0
315	Nitish Kumar Reddy	2024	2025	10	396	114	26.40	1/0	8	2/32	45.75	0/0	5	0
316	Harshit Rana	2024	2025	2	7	7	2.33	0/0	4	3/48	50.75	0/0	1	0
317	Sai Sudharsan	2025	2026	7	383	87	31.92	0/3	—	—	—	—/—	6	0
318	Anshul Kamboj	2025	2025	1	0	0	0.00	0/0	1	1/89	89.00	0/0	0	0
319	Manav Suthar	2026	2026	1	28	28	28	0/0	7	6/33	8.86	1/0	3	0
320	Saransh Jain	2026	2026	1	28	28	28	0/0	7	6/33	8.86	1/0	3	0

== Captains ==
Statistics are correct as of 26 November 2025.

S.No.	Name	Year	Played	Won	Lost	Drawn	Win %
1	C. K. Nayudu	1932–1933	4	0	3	1	0
2	Maharajkumar of Vizianagram	1936	3	0	2	1	0
3	Nawab of Pataudi, Sr.	1946	3	0	1	2	0
4	Lala Amarnath	1947–1952	15	2	6	7	13.33
5	Vijay Hazare	1951–1952	14	1	5	8	7.14
6	Vinoo Mankad	1954–1959	6	0	1	5	0
7	Ghulam Ahmed	1955–1958	3	0	2	1	0
8	Polly Umrigar	1955–1958	8	2	2	4	25.00
9	Hemu Adhikari	1958	1	0	0	1	0
10	Datta Gaekwad	1959	4	0	4	0	0
11	Pankaj Roy	1959	1	0	1	0	0
12	Gulabrai Ramchand	1959	5	1	2	2	20.00
13	Nari Contractor	1960–1961	12	2	2	8	16.66
14	Nawab of Pataudi, Jr.	1961–1974	40	9	19	12	22.50
15	Chandu Borde	1967	1	0	1	0	0
16	Ajit Wadekar	1970–1974	16	4	4	8	25.00
17	Srinivas Venkataraghavan	1974–1979	5	0	2	3	0
18	Sunil Gavaskar	1975–1984	47	9	8	30	19.14
19	Bishan Singh Bedi	1975–1978	22	6	11	5	27.27
20	Gundappa Viswanath	1979	2	0	1	1	0
21	Kapil Dev	1982–1986	34	4	7	23	11.70
22	Dilip Vengsarkar	1987–1989	10	2	5	3	20.00
23	Ravi Shastri	1987	1	1	0	0	100.00
24	Krishnamachari Srikkanth	1989	4	0	0	4	0
25	Mohammad Azharuddin	1989–1998	47	14	14	19	29.78
26	Sachin Tendulkar	1996–1999	25	4	9	12	16.00
27	Sourav Ganguly	2000–2005	49	21	13	15	42.85
28	Rahul Dravid	2003–2007	25	8	6	11	32.00
29	Virender Sehwag	2005–2012	4	2	1	1	50.00
30	Anil Kumble	2007–2008	14	3	5	6	21.42
31	M. S. Dhoni	2007–2014	60	27	18	15	45.76
32	Virat Kohli	2014–2022	68	40	17	11	58.82
33	Ajinkya Rahane	2017–2021	6	4	0	2	66.66
34	KL Rahul	2022	3	2	1	0	66.66
35	Rohit Sharma	2022–2024	24	12	9	3	50.00
36	Jasprit Bumrah	2022–2025	3	1	2	0	33.33
37	Shubman Gill	2025–present	8	4	3	1	50.00
38	Rishabh Pant	2025–present	1	0	1	0	0.00

== Shirt number history ==
Since the 2019 Ashes series, there has been an introduction of names and numbers on all Test players' shirts in an effort to engage new fans and help identify the players. This forms part of the inaugural ICC World Test Championship, a league competition between the top nine Test nations spread over a two-year period, culminating in a Final between the top two teams.

S/N	Current	Past
1	KL Rahul	
3	Ajinkya Rahane	
4	T Natarajan	
5	Washington Sundar	
6	Wriddhiman Saha	
7		MS Dhoni (2005–2014)
8	Ravindra Jadeja	
10		Sachin Tendulkar(1999–2013)
11	Mohammad Shami	
12		Yuvraj Singh (2003–2012)
14	K. S. Bharat	Mayank Agarwal (2019–2020)
15	Bhuvneshwar Kumar	
16	Dhruv Jurel	Mayank Agarwal (2020–2022)
17	Rishabh Pant	
18		Virat Kohli (2011–2025)
19	Umesh Yadav	
20	Axar Patel	
22	Harshit Rana	Jayant Yadav (2016–2022)
23	Kuldeep Yadav	
24	Prasidh Krishna	
25	Cheteshwar Pujara	
30	Manav Suthar	
32	Ishan Kishan	
37	Devdutt Padikkal	
41	Akash Deep	Shreyas Iyer (2019–2023)
45		Rohit Sharma (2013–2024)
49	Mukesh Kumar	
54	Shardul Thakur	
63	Suryakumar Yadav	
64	Yashasvi Jaiswal	
73	Mohammed Siraj	
77	Shubman Gill	
87	Rajat Patidar	
88	Nitish Kumar Reddy	
93	Jasprit Bumrah	
96	Shreyas Iyer	Navdeep Saini (2021)
97	Sarfaraz Khan	Ishant Sharma (2019–2021)
99		Ravichandran Ashwin (2011–2024)
