= Maharajkumar of Vizianagram =

Indian cricketer

Maharajkumar of Vizianagaram
- The Maharajkumar of Vizianagram in 1936

Personal information
- Full name: Vijay Ananda Gajapathi Raju
- Born: 28 December 1905; British India (Note: References disagree about Vizzy's place of birth. Wisden, ESPNcricinfo and similar sources put it at Benares. According to some Indian sources, he was born in Vizianagaram.)
- Died: 2 December 1965 (aged 59); Varanasi, Uttar Pradesh, India
- Nickname: Vizzy
- Batting: Right-handed

International information
- National side: India (1936–1936)
- Test debut (cap 23): 27 June 1936 v England
- Last Test: 18 August 1936 v England

Domestic team information
- Years: Team
- 1934–1935: United Provinces

Career statistics
Competition	Test	First-class
Matches	3	47
Runs scored	33	1,228
Batting average	8.25	18.60
100s/50s	0/0	0/5
Top score	19*	77
Balls bowled	0	168
Wickets	–	4
Bowling average	–	34.75
5 wickets in innings	–	0
10 wickets in match	–	0
Best bowling	–	1/1
Catches/stumpings	1/–	18/–
- Source: ESPNcricinfo, 21 February 2021

Lt. Col. Pusapati Vijaya Ananda Gajapathi Raju (28 December 1905 – 2 December 1965), better known as the Maharajkumar of Vizianagram or Vizzy, was an Indian cricketer, cricket administrator and politician.

== Childhood ==
Vizzy was the second son of Pusapati Vijaya Rama Gajapathi Raju, the ruler of Vizianagaram in present-day Andhra Pradesh. His title Maharajkumar (prince) comes for this reason. After his father died in 1922 and his elder brother became the king, Vizzy moved to the family estates in Benares. He married the eldest daughter of the ruler of the zamindari estate of Kashipur.

He attended the Mayo College in Ajmer and Haileybury and Imperial Service College in England. He excelled at tennis and cricket and was also a hunter.

== Career ==
Vizzy organized his cricket team in 1926 and constructed a ground in his palace compounds. He recruited players from India and abroad. When Marylebone Cricket Club (MCC) cancelled the tour of India in 1930–31 owing to political problems, he organised a team of his own and toured India and Ceylon. He succeeded in drafting Jack Hobbs and Herbert Sutcliffe for the team, a considerable feat as Hobbs had previously refused offers for five such tours. Vizzy brought Learie Constantine to India a few years later. He brought Mushtaq Ali to Benares for training when he was still a high school student. "If Vizzy had been content with being such a cricket sponsor", writes Mihir Bose in A History of Indian Cricket, "like Sir Horatio Mann in the eighteenth century, or Sir Julien Cahn in the twentieth, his name would be one of the most revered in Indian cricket. But he was consumed with the ambition to be a great cricketer".

The organisation of the 1930–31 tour gave Vizzy a standing in Indian cricket that was second only to the Maharaja of Patiala. About this time, Patiala fell out with Lord Willingdon, the viceroy of India, and Vizzy got close with the viceroy. He donated a pavilion named after the viceroy in the newly constructed Feroz Shah Kotla ground in Delhi. When the national championship was started in 1934, he attempted to donate a gold 'Willingdon trophy' but Patiala beat him to it with his Ranji Trophy.

His wealth and contacts brought him great influence in Indian cricket, even though his cricketing abilities were not great. In the early thirties, he offered to pay the board fifty thousand rupees, forty thousand of it for the Indian tour of England in 1932. He was appointed as the 'deputy vice captain' for the tour but withdrew ostensibly on reasons of health and form.

=== Captaincy ===
Vizzy finally was named the captain of the team that toured England in 1936, a post that he secured after lobbying and manipulation. Unfortunately, his desperately poor captaincy on the field resulted in even the normally reserved British press commenting on it. Some of the senior players in the squad, including Lala Amarnath, C. K. Nayudu and Vijay Merchant, were critical of Vizzy's playing abilities and captaincy, and the team was split between those who supported and those who criticised the captain.

The low point in the tour occurred during India's match against Minor Counties at Lord's. Lala Amarnath had been nursing a back injury during the game. Vizzy had Amarnath pad up, but didn't put him in to bat as a succession of other batsmen were sent in ahead of him, which prevented Amarnath from resting his injury. Amarnath was finally put in to bat at the end of the day. Visibly angry after returning to the dressing room, he threw his kit into his bag and muttered in Punjabi, "I know what is transpiring". Vizzy took this as an affront, and conspired with team manager Major Jack Brittain-Jones to have Lala Amarnath sent back from the tour without playing the First Test. It is also alleged that in the First Test against England, Vizzy offered Mushtaq Ali a gold watch to run out Vijay Merchant.

While India lost the series easily, Vizzy was knighted by King Edward VIII in the King's Birthday Honours. He was the only cricketer to have a knighthood bestowed on him while an active Test cricketer, shortly after his Test debut in June of that year, and prior to his last Test in August of that year. Vizzy renounced his knighthood in July 1947, explaining in a letter to Lord Mountbatten that the knighthood "will not be in keeping with the ideals of Republic of India". MCC awarded him a membership without putting him through the customary waiting list.

Vizzy fared poorly in the post-tour enquiry especially in his treatment of Amarnath. In January 1937, the Beaumont Committee report described his captaincy as disastrous. It stated that "he did not understand field placings or bowling changes and never maintained any regular batting order." On team selection, the report stated that "the good players remained idle for weeks together." The report found Amarnath not guilty of any of the charges alleged by Vizzy and Major Jones, and completely exonerated him.

=== Second career ===
Vizzy maintained a low profile thereafter for almost two decades. He made a comeback as a cricket administrator and was the President of BCCI from 1954 to 1957. As the vice-president of the BCCI in 1952, he had played a role in bringing back Lala Amarnath as the Indian captain. He successfully promoted Uttar Pradesh's cricketing profile, making Kanpur a centre for Test cricket. On his invitation, C. K. Nayudu, at the age of 61, captained Uttar Pradesh in the 1956–57 season. He worked for the development of cricket in South India and was asked to be President of Mysore cricket association. He was the Vice Chairman of the All India Council of Sports.

From the 1948–49 series against West Indies, Vizzy became a radio commentator and was the guest commentator for BBC during the Indian tour of England in 1959. He was not a particularly good commentator. According to Dickie Rutnagur, when Vizzy had just finished describing how he had hunted tigers, Rohan Kanhai responded: Really? I thought you just left a transistor radio on when you were commentating and bored them to death.

He was awarded the Padma Bhushan in 1958.

Vizzy was the member of the Lok Sabha from Visakhapatnam in Andhra Pradesh in 1960 and 1962. The Benares University conferred him an honorary Doctor of Laws degree in 1944. He died on 2 December 1965, just short of his 60th birthday, in Benares (now Varanasi).

== Legacy ==
- Vizzy Trophy, an inter-zonal university cricket tournament is named after him.
