= Ladha Ramji =

Indian cricketer (1900–1948)

Personal information
- Full name: Ramji Ladha Nakum
- Born: 10 February 1900; Pidhar, British India (now in Gujarat, British India)
- Died: 20 December 1948 (aged 48); Rajkot, Gujarat, India
- Batting: Right-handed
- Bowling: Right-arm fast
- Relatives: Amar Singh (brother)

International information
- National side: India (1933)
- Only Test (cap 16): 15 December 1933 v England

Career statistics
Competition	Test	First-class
Matches	1	27
Runs scored	1	325
Batting average	0.50	8.55
100s/50s	0/0	0/1
Top score	1	70
Balls bowled	138	4,741
Wickets	0	125
Bowling average	–	17.37
5 wickets in innings	–	5
10 wickets in match	–	3
Best bowling	–	8/14
Catches/stumpings	1/–	25/–
- Source: ESPNcricinfo, 9 June 2022

Ramji Ladha Nakum (10 February 1900 – 20 December 1948) was an Indian Test cricketer who played his solitary test in 1933.

== Cricket career ==
Ramji was a fast bowler. In a first-class match in 1931-32 he took 8 for 14 and 4 for 32 for Freelooters against Nizam's State Railway A. His brother Amar Singh took the other eight wickets.
