= C. K. Nayudu =

Indian cricketer

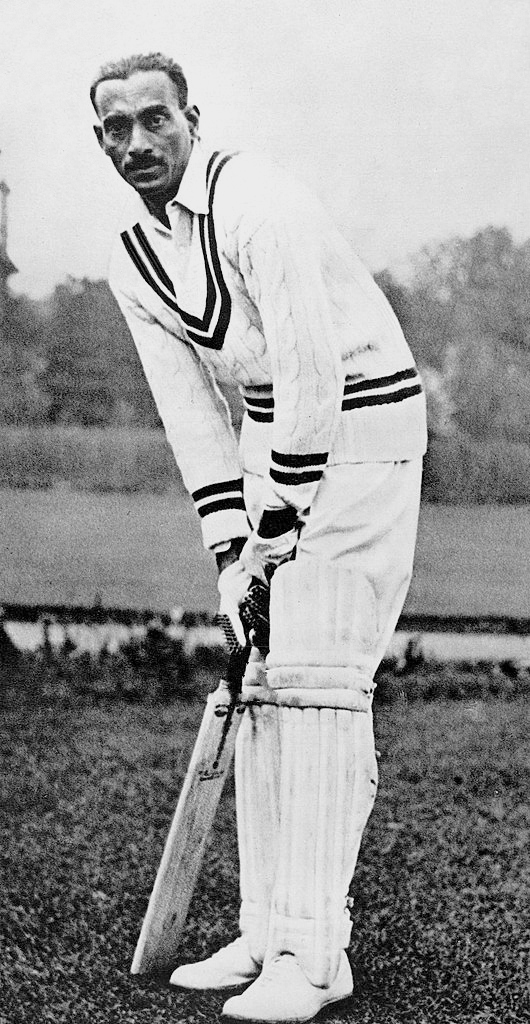

Personal information
- Full name: Cottari Kanakaiya Nayudu
- Born: 31 October 1895; Nagpur, Central Provinces, British India
- Died: 14 November 1967 (aged 72); Indore, Madhya Pradesh, India
- Height: 6 ft 2 in (188 cm)
- Batting: Right-handed
- Bowling: Right-arm slow-medium

International information
- National side: India (1932–1936)
- Test debut (cap 7): 25 June 1932 v England
- Last Test: 15 August 1936 v England

Domestic team information
- Years: Team
- 1916/17–1940/41: Hindus
- 1926/27: Madras
- 1931/32: Hyderabad
- 1932/33–1938/39: Central Provinces-Berar
- 1934/35–1937/38: Central India
- 1941/42–1952/53: Holkar
- 1953/54: Andhra
- 1956/57: Uttar Pradesh

Career statistics
Competition	Test	First-class
Matches	7	207
Runs scored	350	11,825
Batting average	25.00	35.94
100s/50s	0/2	26/58
Top score	81	200
Balls bowled	858	25,798
Wickets	9	411
Bowling average	42.88	29.28
5 wickets in innings	0	12
10 wickets in match	0	2
Best bowling	3/40	7/44
Catches/stumpings	4/–	170/1
- Source: ESPNcricinfo, 10 May 2020

Colonel Cottari Kanakaiya Nayudu (31 October 1895 – 14 November 1967) was an Indian cricketer and cricket administrator who served as the first captain of the Indian national cricket team. He is widely regarded as one of India's greatest cricketers. Nayudu's first-class cricket career spanned 47 years, from 1916 to 1963, a world record. He was a right-handed batsman, an accurate medium pace bowler, and a fine fielder. Known for his aggressive batting style, his ability to hit long sixes sent crowds into a frenzy and became legendary in Indian cricket folklore. Nayudu was named one of the Wisden Cricketers of the Year in 1933 and, in 1956, became the first cricketer to receive the Padma Bhushan from the Government of India.

Nayudu's prime days were with the Hindus team in the Bombay Quadrangular tournament in the 1920s and 1930s, where he was the highest run-scorer in the history of the tournament. His standout performance came in 1926–27 when he scored 153 runs in 116 minutes, hitting 14 fours and 11 sixes, then a world record, against the visiting Marylebone Cricket Club (MCC), which paved the way for India's elevation to Test status. Nayudu led India in their first-ever Test match in the 1932 England tour. He was the leading run-getter for India in the tour and also picked up 65 wickets as a bowler. He also led the Indian team in three more Tests when the England team visited India for their first official tour in 1933–34.

After retiring from Test cricket, Nayudu led the Holkar team to eight Ranji Trophy finals in nine years, winning four titles. His career-best score of 200 came at the age of 51, making him one of the few players to score a double century in first-class cricket after turning 50. Beyond his playing career, Nayudu served as vice-president of the Board of Control for Cricket in India (BCCI) and the chairman of the national selection committee. He was also instrumental in establishing the Andhra Cricket Association and served as its founder president.

In 1923, the ruler of Holkar State invited Nayudu to stay in Indore and conferred upon him the rank of colonel in the state's army. Nayudu is generally considered as 'India's first cricket superstar'. Historian Ramachandra Guha noted of him, "C. K. Nayudu was the first Indian cricketer to be a popular hero, whose appeal transcended the barriers of caste, class, gender and religion. Each of his sixes was interpreted as a nationalist answer to the British Raj." In recognition of his legacy, the BCCI instituted the C. K. Nayudu Lifetime Achievement Award in 1994, and the C. K. Nayudu Trophy, an under-25 domestic cricket competition, is named in his honour.

== Background ==
=== Family history ===
C. K. Nayudu's ancestors belonged to Telugu-speaking people from Machilipatnam in Krishna district of Andhra Pradesh. Nayudu's great-grandfather moved from Machilipatnam to Hyderabad, where he worked as an interpreter to the Nizam of Hyderabad. Nayudu's grandfather, Cottari Narayanaswamy Nayudu settled in Nagpur. Narayanaswamy studied law there and became a well-known lawyer in the city. He was also a landlord and an early member of the Indian National Congress.

Narayanaswamy was affluent enough to send both his sons to England for further studies. The younger son, Surya Prakash Rao Nayudu, C. K. Nayudu's father, studied law at Cambridge University, where he was a contemporary of Ranjitsinhji. Later, he came back to Nagpur and practiced there as a lawyer. After his return from England, he also brought the sport of cricket to the city. The Nayudus are considered as the pioneers of cricket in Nagpur. He was a Justice in High Court of Holkar State for some years. He had four sons and two daughters.

=== Early life ===
Cottari Kanakaiya Nayudu was born on 31 October 1895 in Nagpur, Central Provinces to the Telugu-speaking Kapu family of Cottari Surya Prakash Rao Nayudu and Mahalaxmi. In 1896, at a cricket match played between soldiers and the Nayudu Club XI, Narayanaswamy distributed copper coins to mark the birth of his grandson. C. K. Nayudu was the eldest of four brothers. He was drafted into the school team at the age of seven, and showed promise for a bright future. He studied at St. Francis De'Sales High School and later joined Hislop College.

Nayudu captained his school and college at cricket. He also excelled in hockey and football. He reportedly ran 100 yards (91 m) in 11 seconds in his youth. While still in high school, he became the captain of Modi Cricket Club. In his early playing days, he received coaching from R. Rajanna. Initially, Nayudu had been a defensive batsman. But, his father, Surya Prakash Rao, changed his outlook and encouraged him to attack more.

== Career ==
=== Early career ===
Nayudu made his first-class debut in 1916 in the Bombay Quadrangular. Playing for the Hindus against the Europeans, he came in to bat at No. 9 with his team tottering at 79 for 7. His first scoring shot was a six. But, he only managed 37 runs in the two innings – 27 in the first and 10 in the second. As a bowler, he picked up four wickets for 97 runs.

In 1917, he hit an unbeaten 80 in the final of the Bombay Quadrangular against the Parsis. In 1918, he scored his first hundred playing for an Indian XI against Lord Willingdon's England side at Bombay. He scored 122 as the hosts won by an innings. He represented the Central Provinces in 1919 and Madras in 1920.

Over the next few years, his consistent big hitting became a part of the Indian cricket folklore. In December 1920, he scored 120 runs against the Europeans in Madras. One of the sixes cleared the boundary wall of the Chepauk compound and landed 50 yards (46 m) beyond the ground. The six was estimated to be about 150 yards (140 m).

=== Knock against the MCC ===
An innings which terrified the fieldsmen, dazzling everybody's eyes. It broke all rules of batting science and logic and stirred the crowd to wonder and delight.

— Berry Sarbadhikary on Nayudu's knock of 153 against the MCC

Nayudu burst onto the cricketing scene with his knock of 153 in 116 minutes at the Bombay Gymkhana, playing for Hindus against the visiting Marylebone Cricket Club (MCC) led by Arthur Gilligan in 1926–27. MCC's bowling attack included the likes of Maurice Tate, George Geary, and Bob Wyatt. His century came in just 65 minutes. The knock included 11 sixes which was a new world record in first-class cricket. As per the statistician Anandji Dossa, "Nayudu took 16 scoring strokes to get to fifty, 17 more to reach his century and another 16 to get to his final score." MCC presented a silver bat to Nayudu for his spectacular innings.

Simon Barnes writing for Wisden India Almanack 2016 remarked on Nayudu's innings as follows:

"Here was an innings that changed sporting history and perhaps affected real history as well. Certainly it subverted the archetype of the Indian cricketer, at least as viewed by the English, as someone under-sized, meek, and rather devious. Here was an innings that stood for extravagance, high spirits and flamboyance."

Gilligan was an influential person in English cricket and he lobbied for India's entry into Test cricket. His efforts bore fruit and led to the formation of the Indian cricket board in 1928 and India was granted Test status. Nayudu's innings paved way for India's elevation to Test status.

=== Test career ===
==== Captaining the first Indian Test Team ====
India gained Test status in 1931 and a national team representing India was set to tour England in 1932 as part of their first Test series. In the immediate months before the England tour, the Viceroy of India, Lord Willingdon believed that the team ought to be captained by an English player. It was suggested that an Englishman playing in India, like Alec Hosie, C. P. Johnstone or Reginald Lagden, should captain the team, to placate the factions within the tour party. BCCI resolved that the captain would be an Indian.

Indian cricket at the time was financially patronised by princes and various people of royal background were lobbying for the captaincy. By this time, Nayudu was already considered a legend in Indian cricket. Despite Nayudu's overwhelming credentials to captain the side, the Maharaja of Patiala and the Prince of Limbdi were appointed as captain and deputy captain respectively. Maharajkumar of Vizianagaram "Vizzy" was made the deputy vice-captain. Two weeks before the tour, Maharaja of Patiala withdrew, being busy with his state affairs, and the Maharaja of Porbander was appointed as the captain. Vizzy withdrew from the tour apparently on reasons of health and form.

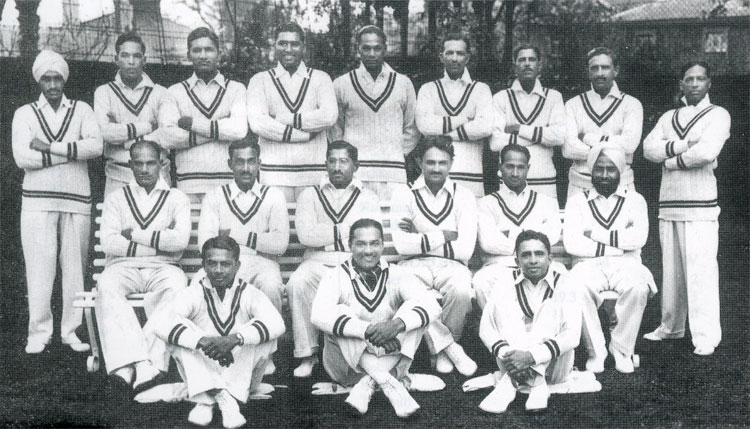
The 1932 Indian national team which toured England. C. K. Nayudu can be seen seated in the middle row, second from left.

Maharaja of Porbander relinquished captaincy on the English tour and it was passed on to Prince of Limbdi, who was injured on the eve of the first Test. The captaincy was finally passed down to Nayudu. However, some of the Indian players protested the decision. In the middle of the night, they had woken up the tour captain, the Maharajah of Porbandar, and told him they only wanted to be led by royalty and not by a 'commoner' like Nayudu. Cables were exchanged with officials in India and the Maharaja of Patiala ordered the players to accept Nayudu's captaincy. Thus, Nayudu became the first ever captain of the Indian national team in Test cricket. He was 36 by the time of his test debut. Despite a painful hand injury while fielding, he top scored with 40 in the first innings. He also took the key wickets of Douglas Jardine and Eddie Paynter. The Cricketer wrote of Nayudu's bowling as, "Nayudu is a clever bowler. Medium pace he flights the ball, can spin it from the off and sends down a faster delivery."

Earlier in the tour, Nayudu recorded a century scoring 118 not out on his first appearance at Lord's, against the MCC. He had a great run throughout the tour. He was the leading run-getter for India in the tour aggregating 1,618 runs, with five centuries, at an average of over 40. As a bowler, he took 65 wickets at an average of 25 runs per wicket and his best performance came when he took five wickets for 21 runs against Leicestershire. Only strike bowlers Mohammad Nissar and Amar Singh took more wickets on the tour. One of Nayudu's sixes at Edgbaston, was said to have cleared the county, crossing the River Rea, which then formed the boundary between Warwickshire and Worcestershire. Overall, 26 matches were played in the tour with India winning 9 matches, losing 9, and 8 matches ending up as a draw. His leadership skills and all-round performances on the tour led Wisden to name him as one of their five 'Cricketers of the Year' for 1933. This made him the first cricketer who played for India to be honoured by Wisden.

==== Final Tests ====
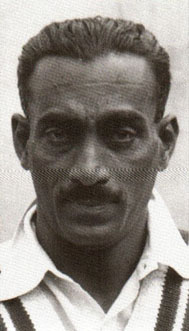
Nayudu in the 1930s

Nayudu also led the Indian team in three more Tests when the England team captained by Douglas Jardine visited India for their first official tour in 1933–34. In the first Test at Bombay, Lala Amarnath and Nayudu put up a partnership of 186 for the third wicket. Nayudu scored 67, while Amarnath became the first Indian batsman to score a Test century with a knock of 118 runs. Nayudu was the captain of India in their first four Test matches, losing three and drawing one at Eden Gardens in 1934.

Nayudu was also a part of the Indian team that toured England in 1936. However, the captaincy had passed to Maharajkumar of Vizianagaram who got the role through lobbying and manipulation. Nayudu played his last Test match in the tour. In that match, despite a painful blow from Gubby Allen, he scored 81 runs—his highest score in Test cricket. He scored 1,102 runs at an average of over 26, and captured 51 wickets at an average of 31.78 runs per wicket in the tour. Wisden noted about his performance as, "So brilliant a success on his previous visit to England, C. K. Nayudu disappointed both himself and his friends." But, Nayudu bowled well, and took the largest number of wickets next only to Nissar.

=== Later years ===
Nayudu led Holkar to eight Ranji Trophy finals in nine years, out of which they won four. In 1944–45 season, the cricket board celebrated his 50th birth anniversary by organising a match between the Cricket Club of India and CK Nayudu's XI. Gul Mohammad and Denis Compton played for Nayudu's team in the match. In the next season, Nayudu scored 101 against Mysore and 200 against Baroda in back to back matches. He led Holkar to a win in the 1952–53 Ranji finals against Bengal and retired from first-class cricket. He also resigned from his post as a Colonel of Holkar state.

However, in 1956–57, Nayudu was asked to come out of retirement to assist Uttar Pradesh in their Ranji Trophy campaign. Early in the season he had made 84 against Rajasthan, striking Vinoo Mankad for two sixes. He made his last appearance in Ranji Trophy in the same season, aged 62, scoring 52 in his last innings against Bombay. His final outing was in a charity match in 1963–64. Aged 68, he played for the Maharashtra Governor's XI against the Maharashtra Chief Minister's XI.

He played for various domestic teams in his career including Hindus, Madras, Hyderabad, Central India, Holkar, Andhra, Uttar Pradesh. He made over 12,000 runs in first class cricket. He holds the world record for the longest first-class career lasting over 47 years. His career-best innings was 200 in the Ranji Trophy, made at the age of 51. He was one of the few batsmen in first-class cricket to have scored a double century after the age of 50. He made 2,567 runs with five centuries in the Ranji Trophy at an average of 36.67. He was also the highest run-scorer in the history of the Bombay Quadrangular tournament with 2,156 runs at an average of 45.87.

==== Cricket Administrator ====
Post-retirement, Nayudu served as the chairman of the national selection committee, vice-president of the BCCI, and as a radio commentator. As the chairman of the selection committee, he personally conducted selection trials for promising first-class cricketers. Though in his late 50s, he would face the young bowlers without leg guards, abdomen and thigh guards, and would ask them to bowl at full pace.

He was instrumental in the formation of Andhra Cricket Association and was its founder president. He and his brother, C. S. Nayudu, played in Guntur and mentored the local Andhra cricketers. Aged 58, C. K. Nayudu led the Andhra team in its first Ranji Trophy match against Mysore in the 1953–54 season. He also scored the team's first-ever fifty in that match.

== Style and technique ==
The pre-war batsman of stature most notable for hitting was an outsider. C. K. Nayudu was a straight hitter of withering force. A six out of Chepauk in December 1920 ended up near a coconut tree 50 yards beyond the ground. Six years later, 11 sixes in a two-hour 153 against MCC at Bombay Gymkhana advanced India's case for Test recognition. And one of Nayudu's 32 sixes on India's 1932 tour of England, at Edgbaston, was said to have cleared the county, crossing the River Rea, which then formed the boundary between Warwickshire and Worcestershire.

— Gideon Haigh on Nayudu's six-hitting prowess

Nayudu played in an era when hitting lofted shots was considered risky and transgressive. But, he was always ready to go for his shots. He was particularly known for hitting long sixes. His ability to hit sixes nonchalantly sent crowds into a frenzy. His very-first scoring shot in first-class cricket was a six. According to him, batting should involve the use of entire body and it's not just about 'elbow up' and 'left leg forward' alone as mentioned in cricket manuals. Bob Wyatt, who played against Nayudu, noted that he was not a mere slogger, for 'his perfect poise, high backlift in a long pendulum swing brought beauty to his strokes'.

Nayudu taught himself to bear physical pain. In one Ranji Trophy match, he was struck on the mouth by a ball which broke two front teeth. He refused medical assistance, brushed the teeth off the wicket with his bat. He requested his rival captain, Mumbai's Madhav Mantri to instruct the bowler Dattu Phadkar to continue bowling fast. In the Oval Test of 1936, despite receiving a painful blow from Gubby Allen, he made a successful attempt to continue batting and hooked the next ball to the boundary. He scored 81 runs—his highest score in Test cricket and denied England an innings victory. He was tough and expected others to have the same kind of toughness.

== Personal life ==
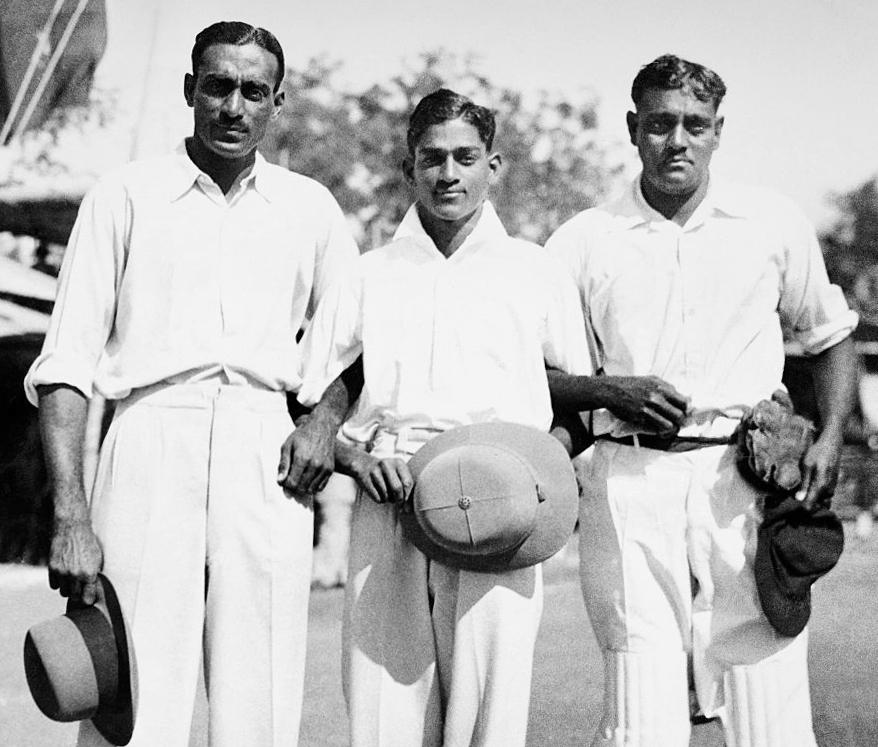
Left-right: C. K. Nayudu, C. S. Nayudu, and C. L. Nayudu in Indore c. 1934. All three brothers played competitive cricket.

Nayudu moved with his family from Nagpur to Indore after he was commissioned by the ruler of Holkar State, Tukojirao Holkar III, with the rank of a captain in his state's army. His home had a Telugu milieu even though they were based outside Andhra. He was a strict disciplinarian both on the field and with his family too. On off days between matches, he would regularly host his teammates at his house and would regale them with stories from his cricketing career. He was a chain smoker. He was also eccentric on particular issues. He routinely asked players to not consume water in the drinks break as he thought it wasn't good for their fitness.

His first wife, Chandramma died only a few years after their wedding. He later married Gunawati. He had nine children from his two marriages—seven daughters and two sons. His son, Prakash Nayudu was a sportsperson who represented Madhya Pradesh cricket team and was a National Junior Table Tennis champion. Prakash was also an Indian Police Service officer. His other son, C. N. Nayudu also played first-class cricket for Madhya Pradesh. His daughter, Chandra Nayudu was India's first female cricket commentator. His grandson, Vijay Nayudu represented Madhya Pradesh in the Ranji Trophy. His granddaughter Manjula Rao is an advocate and served as a special public prosecutor in the Best Bakery case. His younger brother, C. S. Nayudu also played Test cricket for India. His other younger brothers — C. L. Nayudu and C. R. Nayudu were first-class cricketers.

A few months before his 72nd birthday, Nayudu suffered a stroke. It left him unconscious and he was confined to a bed from then on till his death half-a-year later. He lost his speech during his last days and visitors were not allowed to meet him. He died on 14 November 1967 in Indore at the age of 72. D. B. Deodhar attributed Nayudu's death to his habit of chain-smoking.

== Reputation and legacy ==
C. K. Nayudu was the first truly mass hero of subcontinental sport, each of his sixes was interpreted as a nationalist answer to the British Raj. He was the first Indian cricketer to be a popular hero, whose appeal transcended the barriers of caste, class, gender and religion.

— Ramachandra Guha on C. K. Nayudu

Nayudu is widely regarded as one of India's greatest cricketers. He was the first Indian cricketer to endorse a brand in 1941. His name was even used to promote movies. V. Shantaram's Duniya Na Mane (1937) featured Nayudu's name in hoardings to advertise the film.

The Government of India awarded Nayudu Padma Bhushan, the third highest civilian honour, in 1956. He was the first ever cricketer to be conferred the award. In 2006, the BCCI instituted an award named the Col C. K. Nayudu Lifetime Achievement Award, given to individuals for their unparalleled lifetime contribution to Indian cricket. From the 1973–74 season, India's under-25 domestic tournament has been known as C. K. Nayudu Trophy. One of the banquet halls in Cricket Club of India, the C. K. Nayudu Hall is named after him. He was inducted into the Wisden India Hall of Fame in 2014.

In Nayudu's birthplace Nagpur, a street has been named after him and a bronze bust with his likeness stands in the premises of the Vidarbha Cricket Association Ground. Nehru Stadium in Indore sports a statue of Nayudu, outside its main entrance. One of its stands and a pavilion block in the same stadium were also named after him. Another statue was installed at the Holkar Stadium, Indore in 2023.

C. K. Nayudu is India's greatest cricketer. Whether it was bowling, batting, fielding, captaincy, physical fitness, positive approach to the game, there will never be Nayudu's equal among Indians. Nayudu's name will be cherished and remembered as long as cricket is played in this country.

— Vijay Merchant on C. K. Nayudu

A road was named after him in his ancestral hometown Machilipatnam by the then Chief Minister of Andhra Pradesh Kasu Brahmananda Reddy. In 2018, a statue of Nayudu was inaugurated in Machilipatnam by the former Indian team captain Anil Kumble. On 4 April 2005, a bronze statue of Nayudu titled 'The Colossus of Cricket' was unveiled near the entrance of the ACA-VDCA Stadium in Visakhapatnam.

Cricket historian Ramachandra Guha called Nayudu 'the first great Indian cricketer'. In 2001, Guha included him in his All-Star Eleven team of great Indian cricketers with a countrywide popularity whose stardom persisted beyond retirement. Nayudu was also chosen as the captain of the team.

Various other commentators have remarked on him as 'India's first cricket superstar', and as 'the first world-class cricketer from India'. Dicky Rutnagur, the sports journalist, once wrote that schoolboys left their classes and businessmen stopped trading to be at Bombay Gymkhana when they heard that C. K. Nayudu had arrived at the crease. Syed Mushtaq Ali rated him as the best captain he had played under. Commentator Ravi Chaturvedi wrote of him, "It was his lyrical style that made him one of the greatest players that the country has ever produced. He gave the game the grace of a ballet that was applauded by its spectators, who otherwise used to witness it as a combat." Vasant Raiji called Nayudu 'the Shahenshah of Indian Cricket' (transl. The Emperor of Indian Cricket).
