= Madhusudan Rege =

Indian cricketer (1924–2013)

Personal information
- Full name: Madhusudan Ramachandra Rege
- Born: 18 March 1924; Panvel, British India
- Died: 16 December 2013 (aged 89)
- Batting: Right-handed
- Bowling: Right-arm offbreak

International information
- National side: India
- Only Test (cap 51): 27 January 1949 v West Indies

Career statistics
Competition	Test	First-class
Matches	1	39
Runs scored	15	2,348
Batting average	7.50	37.26
100s/50s	0/0	6/12
Top score	15	164
Balls bowled	–	3,159
Wickets	–	33
Bowling average	–	42.96
5 wickets in innings	–	1
10 wickets in match	–	0
Best bowling	–	5/23
Catches/stumpings	1/–	24/–
- Source: CricketArchive, 30 November 2013

Madhusudan Ramachandra Rege (18 March 1924 – 16 December 2013) was an Indian cricketer who played in one Test match in 1949 against the West Indies. He has the dubious distinction of being the first Indian cricketer to be called for throwing.

He played for Maharashtra from 1944–45 to 1954–55, captaining the team from 1951–52 to 1954–55. His highest score was 164, against Gujarat in the Ranji Trophy in 1953–54.

For Maharashtra against the MCC in 1951–52, he opened the batting and scored 133 out of the team's total of 249. It was in that match that he was called for throwing.
