= Syed Mushtaq Ali =

Indian cricketer (1914 – 2005)

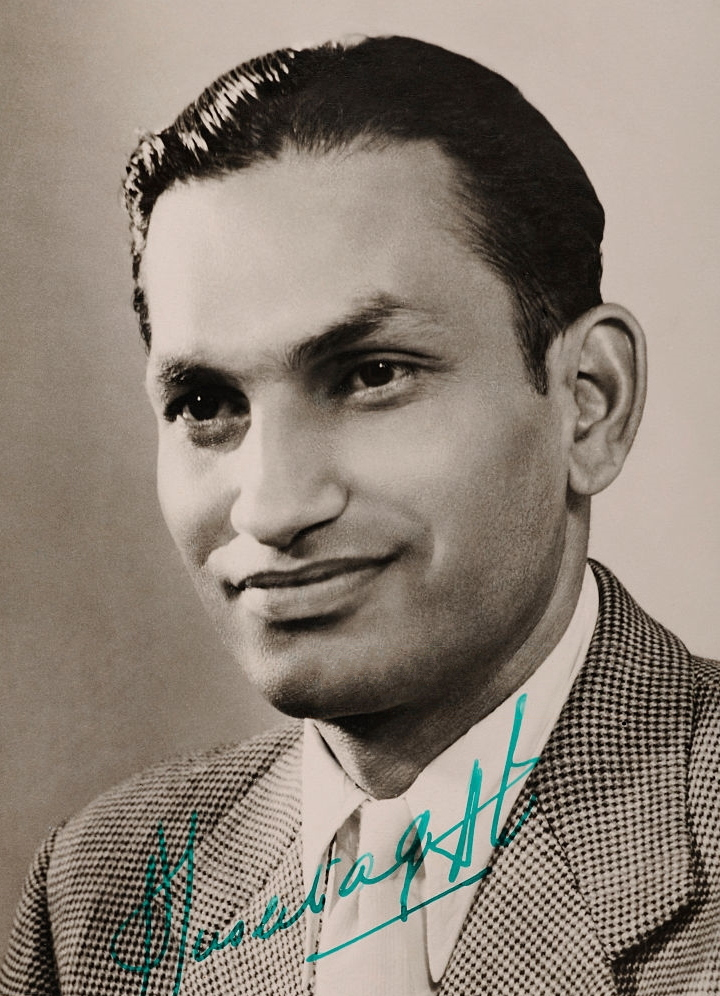
- Mushtaq Ali in 1936

Personal information
- Full name: Syed Mushtaq Ali
- Born: 17 December 1914; Indore, Indore State, British India
- Died: 18 June 2005 (aged 90); Indore, Madhya Pradesh, India
- Batting: Right-handed
- Bowling: Slow left-arm orthodox
- Role: All-Rounder

International information
- National side: India (1934–1952)
- Test debut (cap 19): 5 January 1934 v England
- Last Test: 6 February 1952 v England

Domestic team information
- Years: Team
- 1934–1944: Muslims
- 1934–1940: Central India
- 1937: Rajputana
- 1939: Central Provinces and Berar
- 1941: Gujarat
- 1941: Maharashtra
- 1941–1955: Holkar
- 1941: United Provinces
- 1955: Madhya Bharat
- 1956–1957: Uttar Pradesh
- 1957–1958: Madhya Pradesh

Career statistics
| Competition | Test | First-class |
|---|---|---|
| Matches | 11 | 226 |
| Runs scored | 612 | 13,213 |
| Batting average | 32.21 | 35.90 |
| 100s/50s | 2/3 | 30/63 |
| Top score | 112 | 233 |
| Balls bowled | 378 | 9,702 |
| Wickets | 3 | 162 |
| Bowling average | 67.33 | 29.34 |
| 5 wickets in innings | 0 | 6 |
| 10 wickets in match | 0 | 2 |
| Best bowling | 1/45 | 7/108 |
| Catches/stumpings | 7/– | 160/– |
- Source: ESPNcricinfo, 24 May 2020

Syed Mushtaq Ali (17 December 1914 – 18 June 2005) was an Indian cricketer, a right-handed opening batsman who holds the distinction of scoring the first overseas Test century by an Indian player when he scored 112 against England at Old Trafford in 1936. Mushtaq Ali was noted for his graceful batting style and a flair which often cost him his wicket by being over-adventurous too soon in an innings. He received the C. K. Nayudu Lifetime Achievement Award in 1995, the highest honour bestowed by the BCCI on a former player. He batted right-handed and bowled slow left-arm orthodox spin. He bowled frequently enough in domestic matches to be classified as an all-rounder but only occasionally in Test matches.

== Career ==
Mushtaq Ali was observed by C. K. Nayudu at Indore at the age of 13 and helped to develop his cricketing skills.

A Wisden Special Award winner, he scored four first-class hundreds in the 1936 tour. He was an opening or middle-order batsman who played very little international cricket mainly due to World War II. In total, he played in 11 Tests. He made his debut in the second Test against England at Calcutta in January 1934, and played his last Test against England at Madras in February 1952, at the age of 38.

=== Domestic cricket ===
He was educated in Indore and at Aligarh Muslim University. He played extensively for regional teams and private clubs when cricket was a young sport in India. In first-class cricket, he represented Holkar, Central India, Maharashtra, Gujarat, Madhya Bharat, Uttar Pradesh, Madhya Pradesh and India between 1930 and 1964.

He played for Holkar in the National Championship for the Ranji Trophy along with other stalwarts like C. K. Nayudu. He was awarded the Padma Shri in 1964 and made a life member of the Marylebone Cricket Club for his contribution to the game. He published his autobiography, Cricket Delightful in 1967. He died in his sleep, at the age of 90 in 2005. The Indian domestic T20 series is named after him. Mushtaq Ali's son, Gulrez Ali, and his grandson, Abbas Ali, both played first-class cricket.

== Awards ==
- Padma Shri – awarded in 1964
- C. K. Nayudu Lifetime Achievement Award - awarded in 1995
- Syed Mushtaq Ali Trophy – This is a Twenty20 cricket domestic championship in India, organized by the Board of Control for Cricket in India, among the teams from the Ranji Trophy. The 2008–09 season was the inaugural season for this trophy.
