= Mohammad Nissar =

Indian Test cricketer

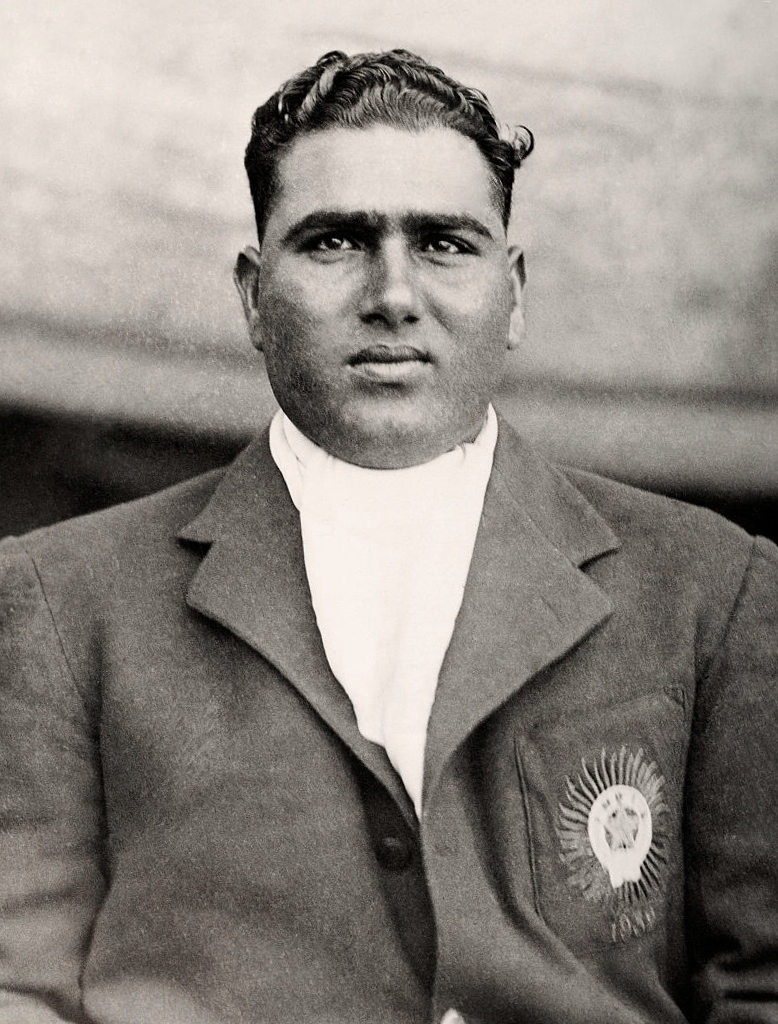

Personal information
- Full name: Mohammad Nissar
- Born: 1 August 1910; Hoshiarpur, Punjab, British India
- Died: 11 March 1963 (aged 52); Lahore, Punjab, Pakistan
- Height: 6 ft (183 cm)
- Batting: Right-handed
- Bowling: Right-arm fast

International information
- National side: India (1932–1936)
- Test debut (cap 9): 25 June 1932 v England
- Last Test: 15 August 1936 v England

Career statistics
| Competition | Test | First-class |
|---|---|---|
| Matches | 6 | 93 |
| Runs scored | 55 | 1120 |
| Batting average | 6.87 | 10.98 |
| 100s/50s | 0/0 | 0/0 |
| Top score | 14 | 49 |
| Balls bowled | 1,211 | 15,061 |
| Wickets | 25 | 396 |
| Bowling average | 28.28 | 17.70 |
| 5 wickets in innings | 3 | 32 |
| 10 wickets in match | 0 | 3 |
| Best bowling | 5/90 | 6/17 |
| Catches/stumpings | 2/– | 65/– |
- Source: ESPNcricinfo, 10 May 2020

Mohammad Nissar (1 August 1910 – 11 March 1963) was a cricketer, who played as a fast bowler for the pre-independence Indian cricket team and domestic teams in India and Pakistan. He was born into a Punjabi family in Hoshiarpur, Punjab, and is considered the fastest pre-independence Indian pace bowler. He was arguably one of the fastest bowlers in the world during his time.

Indian batsman C.K. Nayudu claimed in writings that during his first spell, Nissar was faster than Englishman Harold Larwood, who terrorized Australia in 1932 in the infamous Bodyline series. Nissar along with Amar Singh formed an Indian fast bowling duo that was considered one of the best in the world during the 1930s. He was one of the founders of the Pakistan Cricket Board (PCB). He emigrated to Pakistan in 1947 and died in Lahore in 1963.

== Career ==
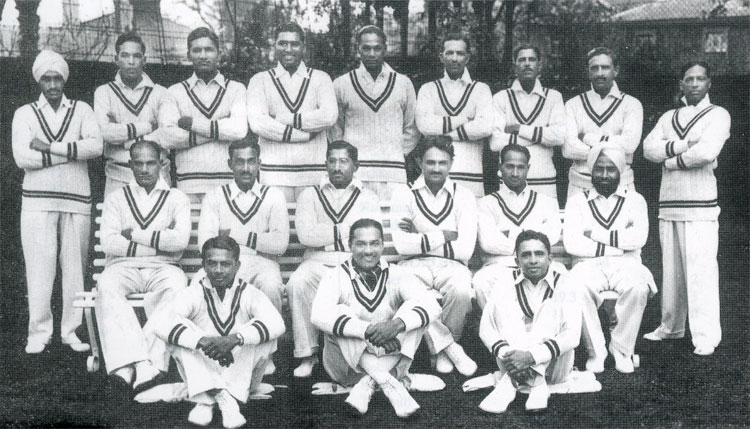
The 1932 Indian Test Cricket team that toured England. Mohammad Nissar seen standing fourth on this photo of the team captained by Maharaja of Porbandar.

Mohammed Nissar was drafted into the Indian team which toured England in 1932. He was a part of the side which contained players like CK Nayudu, the brothers Wazir Ali and Nazir Ali, and of course, his famous bowling partner, Amar Singh. Even today, Nissar's main claim to fame was of being the first man to take a wicket for India, and for being the fastest pre-war bowler India have produced. Nissar's career kick-started right in his first match, as he, in the first ball of his second over, dismissed Herbert Sutcliffe for 3, knocking over Sutcliffe's stumps. Then, with the fifth ball of the very same over, he bowled the other opener, Percy Holmes.

What made this fact extraordinary was that Holmes and Sutcliffe were involved in an opening stand of 555 for Yorkshire just ten days ago. In the course of his 26-over spell, Nissar scalped five wickets for 93 runs, as England were skittled for 259, a below-par score for a team that had looked much stronger on paper. In the second innings, Nissar bowled 18 overs and took a wicket, of Walter Robins, who was a victim of his in the first innings as well, for 42 runs. Overall, with a strike rate of 44, and with match figures of 6 for 135, Nissar gave a glimpse of other performances England should have watched out for when he played them.

That was to be the only test match for India that year, but there were many other first-class matches on the tour, where Nissar grabbed 71 wickets at an average of 18.09. In 1935–36, when Jack Ryder's Australian XI toured India to play against Maharaja "Vizzy" Vizianagaram's Indian team, he made a mark there too, taking 32 wickets in 4 unofficial tests.

Nissar's last test was against England in August 1936, at The Oval, where he managed to take six wickets, including a five wicket haul, even though India lost the match.

== See also ==
- List of India cricketers who have taken five-wicket hauls on Test debut
