= Indian cricket team in Australia in 1947–48 =

International cricket tour

Indian cricket team in Australia, 1947–48
- Date: 17 October 1947 – 20 February 1948
- Location: Australia
- Result: Australia won the 5-Test series 4–0
Teams
- Australia: India
Captains
- Don Bradman: Lala Amarnath
Most runs
- Don Bradman (715) Lindsay Hassett (332) Arthur Morris (209): Vijay Hazare (429); Dattu Phadkar (314); Vinoo Mankad (306)
Most wickets
- Ray Lindwall (18) Bill Johnston (16) Ian Johnson (16): Lala Amarnath (13); Vinoo Mankad (12); Dattu Phadkar (8)

The India national cricket team toured Australia in the 1947–48 season to play a five-match Test series against Australia. Australia won the series 4–0, with one match drawn.

This was India's inaugural tour of Australia and it was also the first tour by a team representing the newly independent India. Independence had been finalised only two months before the tour began.

As evident from the scoreline, the Australian team greatly outclassed the Indians, who had some good individual performances to their credit. However, they did not put up much resistance as a team, with their batting failing to make any impression on the Australians. The only silver lining for India in terms of match results was their two victories in the First Class Matches.

== Touring party ==
A sub-committee under the chairmanship of Anthony de Mello was formed to recommend to the BCCI the India team to tour Australia the following season. The touring party comprising 17 players was announced 17 March 1947. A series of games were played prior to the selection to select a team for the tour that included the following day. For the touring squad, Vijay Merchant was named the captain and Lala Amarnath, his deputy. Pankaj Gupta was named the tour manager. Merchant had to drop out in September due to issues with his fitness; also Rusi Modi for the same reason. Amarnath was subsequently named the captain. Fazal Mahmood was dropped out as he joined Pakistan cricket team and Syed Mushtaq Ali was also dropped out in early October. Chandu Sarwate, Kanwar Rai Singh, Ranvirsinhji and C. R. Rangachari were named as their replacements on 6 October, while Hazare was named the vice-captain. The squad left for Australia on 8 October and arrived on 10 October in Darwin.

The team members were:

- Lala Amarnath, Southern Punjab, captain & all-rounder
- Vijay Hazare, Baroda, Vice-captain & batsman
- Hemu Adhikari, Baroda, batsman
- Amir Elahi, Baroda, leg break bowler
- Jenni Irani, Sindh, wicket-keeper
- Gogumal Kishenchand, Kathiawar, batsman
- Vinoo Mankad, Gujarat, opening batsman; all-rounder
- Gul Mohammad, Baroda, medium bowler
- C. S. Nayudu, Holkar, leg break bowler
- Dattu Phadkar, Bombay, all-rounder; fast medium bowler
- Kanwar Rai Singh, Southern Punjab, batsman
- C. R. Rangachari, Madras, fast-medium bowler
- Khandu Rangnekar, Bombay, batsman
- Ranvirsinhji, Nawanagar, opening batsman
- Chandu Sarwate, Holkar, opening batsman
- Probir Sen, Bengal, wicket-keeper
- Ranga Sohoni, Maharashtra, all-rounder; fast medium bowler

== First-class matches ==
In addition to the Test series, the tourists played nine other first-class matches against Western Australia (2 games – the tour opener and the last game of the tour); South Australia; Victoria; New South Wales; Australia XI; Queensland; and Tasmania (2 matches). India won two and lost three of these matches, the other four being drawn.

== Western Australia v Indians ==
17–21 October 1947
Scorecard

Western Australia	v	Indians
171 (74.2 overs); Allan Edwards 49; Vinoo Mankad 5/68 (27 overs)		144 (45.2 overs); Vinoo Mankad 57; Morgan Herbert 7/45 (15.2 overs)
70/4 (19 overs); David Watt 34*; Lala Amarnath 2/11 (5 overs)

Match drawn
WACA Ground, Perth
Umpires: JP Robbins, and ET Tonkinson

- Indians won the toss and chose to field.

== South Australia v Indians ==
24–28 October 1947
Scorecard

South Australia	v	Indians
518/8d (110 overs); Don Bradman 156; Vinoo Mankad 4/127 (36 overs)		451 (104.6 overs); Lala Amarnath 144; Geff Noblet 3/65 (25 overs)
219/8d 65 overs Geff Noblet 50*; Dattu Phadkar 4/59 (15 overs)		235/4 (46 overs); Vinoo Mankad 116*; Kevin O'Neill 1/40 (9 overs)

Match drawn
Sydney Cricket Ground, Sydney
Umpires: George Cooper and John Scott

- South Australia won the toss and decided to bat.
- Ron Hamence (South Australia) passed 3,000 runs in first-class cricket.

== Victoria v Indians ==
30 October – 3 November 1947
Scorecard

Indians	v	Victoria
403 (105.7 overs); Lala Amarnath 228*; Bill Johnston 3/56 (22 overs)		273 (72.2 overs); Neil Harvey 87; Vinoo Mankad 4/55 (20.2 overs)
203 (61.7 overs); Vijay Hazare 83; Bill Johnston 3/40 (17.7 overs)		138/1 (43 overs); Lindsay Hassett 67*; Lala Amarnath 1/13 (4 overs)

Match drawn
Melbourne Cricket Ground, Melbourne
Umpires: Andrew Barlow and Ron Wright

- Indians won the toss and decided to bat.

== New South Wales v Indians ==
7–11 November 1947
Scorecard

New South Wales	v	Indians
561/8d (116 overs); Arthur Morris 162; Vinoo Mankad 3/156 (41 overs)		298 (81.3 overs); Vijay Hazare 142; Keith Miller 52/4 (17.3 overs)
		215 (f/o) (56.4 overs); Hemu Adhikari 65; Ernie Toshack 4/65 (16 overs)

New South Wales won by an innings and 48 runs
Sydney Cricket Ground, Sydney
Umpires: Herbert Elphinstone, George Borwick

- New South Wales won the toss and decided to bat.
- Keith Miller (New South Wales) passed 4,000 runs in first-class cricket.
- Ernie Toshack (New South Wales) claimed his 100th wicket in first-class cricket.

== Australian XI v Indians ==
14–18 November 1947
Scorecard

Indians	v	Australian XI
326 (93.1 overs); Gul Mohammad 85; Sam Loxton 3/70 (22 overs)		380 (91.1 overs); Don Bradman 172; Ranga Sohoni 4/89 (17 overs)
304 (106 overs); Gogumal Kishenchand 63; Bill Johnston 4/70 (31 overs)		203 (30 overs); Neil Harvey 56*; Vinoo Mankad 8/84 (12 overs)

Indians won by 47 runs
Sydney Cricket Ground, Sydney, Australia
Umpires: George Borwick, WJ Callum

- Indians won the toss and elected to bat.
- 16 November was a rest day.

== Queensland v India ==
21–25 November 1947
Scorecard

Queensland	v	Indians
341 (110.6 overs); William Morris 115; Vinoo Mankad 6/76 (41.6 overs)		369 (102.7 overs); Lala Amarnath 172*; Len Johnson 6/83 (29.7 overs)
269/7d (88.5 overs); Colin McCool 101*; Vinoo Mankad 3/61 (23 overs)		217 (41.4 overs); Amir Elahi 44; Colin McCool 5/68 (14.4 overs)

Queensland won by 24 runs
The Gabba, Brisbane
Umpires: William Cain and Ron Weitemeyer

- Queensland won the toss and chose to bat.
- Cyril Smith (Queensland) made his debut in first-class matches.

== Queensland Country v Indians ==
6–8 December 1947
Scorecard

Indians	v	Queensland Country
333 (89.4 overs); G Kishenchand 75; HR Adhikari 70; Aubrey Warrener 49/3 (19.4 overs)		145 (42.2 overs); T Allen 54; N Wright 25; DG Phadkar 4/23 (9 overs)

Match Drawn
Slade Park, Warwick, Queensland
Umpires: EW Burke, JR McMenamin

- Indians won the toss and decided to bat

== Western New South Wales v Indians ==
20–22 December 1947
Scorecard

Indians	v	Western New South Wales
143 (36.2 overs); VS Hazare 66*; KM Rangnekar 18; DB Lester 5/28 (5.2 overs)		100 (34.4 overs); FD Smith 27; CFT Price 22; MH Mankad 4/21 (13.4 overs)
205/6 (dec) (39 overs); CT Sarwate 65; VS Hazare 42*; FB Martin 2/28 (6 overs)		144 (31.2 overs); CJ Kearney 34; CFT Price 28; MH Mankad 6/38 (13.2 overs)

Indians won by 104 runs
Sports Ground, Bathurst, New South Wales
Umpires: AR Schofield, FW Schofield

== Southern New South Wales v Indians ==
27–29 December 1947
Scorecard

Indians	v	Southern New South Wales
364/9 (dec) (87 overs); PK Sen 93; KR Singh 71; J Lear 4/94 (17 overs)		228 (61 overs); M Hanna 88; RJ Bonser 52; CT Sarwate 3/52 (13 overs)
		141/4 (f/o) (20 overs); AK Stevens 52*; H Stapleton 36*; CS Nayudu 3/57 (8 overs)

Match drawn
Manuka Oval, Griffith, Canberra
Umpires: VA Griffiths, W Mackie

- Indians won the toss and decided to bat

== Tasmania v Indians ==
10–13 January 1947
Scorecard

Tasmania	v	Indians
142 (38 overs); RV Thomas 45; JL Murfett; CR Rangachari 6/45 (12 overs)		406/7 (dec) (100.7 overs); L Amarnath 171; VS Hazare 115; CG Richardson 3/89 (25 overs)
125 (39.1 overs); WT Walmsley 33; ROG Morrisby 29; L Amarnath 3/18 (11 overs)

Indians won by an innings and 139 runs
TCA Ground, Hobart, Australia
Umpires: HDG Hickman, AJ Watkins

- Indians won the toss and decided to field

== Tasmania v Indians ==
10–13 January 1947
Scorecard

Indians	v	Tasmania
457/7 (dec) (102 overs); L Amarnath 135; CT Sarwate 128; WT Walmsley 3/104 (22 overs)		458 (121.4 overs); WT Walmsley 180*; ROG Morrisby 130; Ct Sarwate 3/102 (27 overs)

Match drawn
NTCA Ground, Launceston, Tasmania
Umpires: RJ Harrison, E Watling

- Indians won the toss and decided to field

== South Australia Country v Indians ==
20–21 January 1948
Scorecard

Indians	v	South Australia Country
421/7 (dec) (85 overs); VS Hazare 140*; HR Adhikari 117; J McGregor 3/46 (15 overs)		184 (43.2 overs); G Promnitz 47; J Herriot 33; D Skipworth 33; R Sohoni 4/37 (14 overs)
		131 (f/o) (25.4 overs); J Herriot 36; D Skipworth 22; MH Mankad 7/50 (10.4 overs)

Indians won by an innings and 106 runs
McDonald Park, Mount Gambier, Australia
Umpires: J Lane, E Pepper

== Victoria Country v Indians ==
31 January – 2 February 1948
Scorecard

Victoria Country	v	Indians
153 (42); W Hughes 30; H Thorp 29; A Elahi 5/57 (13 overs)		291/6 (dec) (59 overs); CT Sarwate 59; MS Ranvirsinhji 52; R Adams 2/43 (10 overs)
114 (45.1 overs); W Hughes 26; R Ziersch 23; CT Sarwate 3/17 (6 overs)

Indians won by an innings and 24 runs
Mildura City Oval, Mildura, Victoria
Umpires: W McKelver, C Rooks

== Western Australia v Indians ==
20–24 February 1948
Scorecard

West Australia	v	Indians
270 (64.5 overs); DK Carmody 85; CW Langdon 55; MH Mankad 5/60 (18.5 overs)		252 (77.3 overs); Gul Mohammad 70; HR Adhikari 35; CW Puckett 5/56 (22.3 overs)
172 (57.2 overs); BA Rigg 54*; DK Carmody 24; MH Mankad 4/41 (17 overs)		184 (68.1 overs); VS Hazare 50; G Kishenchand 46; CW Puckett 6/78 (29.1 overs)

Western Australia won by 6 runs
WACA, Perth, Australia
Umpires: OTC Cooley, RM Lethbridge

- Western Australia won the toss and decided to bat

== Test series summary ==
- 1st Test at Brisbane Cricket Ground – Australia won by an innings and 226 runs
- 2nd Test at Sydney Cricket Ground – match drawn
- 3rd Test at Melbourne Cricket Ground – Australia won by 233 runs
- 4th Test at Adelaide Oval – Australia won by an innings and 16 runs
- 5th Test at Melbourne Cricket Ground – Australia won by an innings and 177 runs

=== 1st Test ===
28 November – 4 December 1947
Scorecard

Australia	v	India
382/8d (115 overs); Don Bradman 185* (336); Lala Amarnath 4/84 (39 overs)		58 (21.3 overs); Lala Amarnath 22 (40); Ernie Toshack 5/2 (2.3 overs)
		98 (49.7 overs); Chandra Sarwate 26 (160); Ernie Toshack 6/29 (17 overs)

Australia win by an innings and 226 runs
Brisbane Cricket Ground, Brisbane
Umpires: Andrew Barlow (Aus) and George Borwick (Aus)

- Australia won the toss and elected to bat.
- Persistent rain led to only hour of play on day 1, and one session of play each on days 3 and 4.
- Eight balls per over.
- Bill Johnston (Aus), Hemu Adhikari, Gogumal Kishenchand, Khandu Rangnekar and Jenni Irani (Ind) made their Test debuts.
- 30 November was a rest day.
- No play was possible on day 5.

Match background

The Indian team had played six first-class matches prior to this match, and they had a below-par win–loss ratio of one win and two losses, both being innings defeats. Australia, though, had a remarkable record in their last ten test series, winning eight of them, and three out of a total three series after the war. Their win–loss record was exemplary as well, winning 29 and losing only 7, out of 45 tests. However, the Indian team had reason to believe that they could punch above their weight, as they had unearthed in Vinoo Mankad, a talented all-rounder, who had taken 39 wickets in those six matches, and had also scored 516 runs from 11 innings at an average of 46.90, and their captain Lala Amarnath's good run with the bat and the emergence of a future batting stalwart for India, Vijay Hazare, made India's prospects look a little brighter. However, Australia's captain, Don Bradman was a major stumbling block in India's path. At the start of the series his record was: 42 test matches, 5773 runs, Average of 97.84. Worryingly, for the touring side, He had already scored heavily against the Indian attack for the Australian XI outfit against India, an imposing 172. So his presence meant definite trouble for Lala Amarnath's side.

Match Report

The Brisbane pitch was quite benign and did not trouble the Australians, who chose to bat first after winning the toss. The Australian top order were in full control of the match from the start, stringing partnerships effectively. Don Bradman scored 185, piling on runs and misery on the Indian bowlers, who toiled in vain on a pitch that did not support them. He anchored partnerships with the other batsmen, and even when he ran out of partners, Wisden noted, "...but completely demoralised the bowlers by punishing methods which brought runs at a terrific rate." his knock contained twenty fours. Australia ended the first day with their scorecard reading: 273/3, and Bradman being unbeaten on 160.

In the second day, only one hour of play was possible due to rain, and Australia went through the scheduled hour of play without losing a wicket, and adding 36 runs more. Surprisingly, a large attendance of 11,000 people came to watch the day's play. The third day of the match saw yet another burst of rain, which saturated the pitch. Bradman had been dismissed by then for a two-hundred-and-eighty-five-minute vigil that yielded 185 runs, placed Australia on a safe perch at 382 for 8. Realizing that the uncovered pitch could be advantageous for Australia's bowlers, Bradman declared; leaving the Indian side the daunting prospect of negotiating, what, in Wisden's words, was a "treacherous" pitch.

The Indian batsmen, who were accustomed to "...the fast, hard pitches in their own country...", could not cope up with the Australian bowling, and especially struggled against the bowling of Ernie Toshack, who exploited the conditions in a versatile manner, and in an extremely short spell of nineteen balls, returned remarkable figures of 5 wickets for a solitary run. The Indians crumbled to 58 all out.

Trailing by 324, the Indians had to climb a mountain to evade a huge innings defeat, but were unable to do so, as none of their batsmen except Chandu Sarwate, offered any resistance. Sarwate, batted for two hours and forty minutes-160 minutes, to graft a determined 26. However, the other Indians again crumbled in the face of some quality pace, again, by Toshack himself (he took 6 wickets for 29 runs), and collapsed to be 98 all out, thus, Australia wrapped up the match, inflicting an innings-and-226-runs drubbing on the Indians. This defeat, Wisden noted could have been confidence-sapping for the Indians.

=== 2nd Test ===
12–18 December 1947
Scorecard

India	v	Australia
188 (70 overs); Dattu Phadkar 51 (97); Colin McCool 3/71 (18 overs)		107 (46.2 overs); Ron Hamence 25 (77); Vijay Hazare 4/29 (13.2 overs)
61/7 (37 overs); Lala Amarnath 14 (25); WA Johnston 3/15 (13 overs)

Match drawn
Sydney Cricket Ground, Sydney
Umpires: Andrew Barlow (Aus) and George Borwick (Aus)

- India won the toss and elected to bat.
- Persistent rain led to only one hour of play on day 2 and no play on days 3, 4 and 6.
- Eight balls per over.
- Amir Elahi and Dattu Phadkar (Ind) made their test debuts.
- 14 December was a rest day.

Match Background

This match was marred by rain, as only ten hours of play was possible in six days of play, out of which three days' worth of play was washed out, literally. The rain-affected "sticky dog" of a pitch proved terrible for batting, with none of the two teams managing even a score of 200. The Indian team squad changed slightly, fielding two debutants, Dattu Phadkar and Amir Elahi, replacing KM Rangnekar and Ranga Sohoni, the former going on to make an impressive debut. Australia missed Ernie Toshack due to injury, and this might have made a difference, since Toshack exploited the rain-affected pitch in the first match and could have done so this time around, had he played. However, this match is best remembered for the infamous "Mankading" incident, in which the Indian bowler, Vinoo Mankad ran out the Australian batsman Bill Brown for backing up too far, despite being warned in the first test.

However, Don Bradman, Bill Brown's captain, defended Mankad's sportsmanship in his autobiography, saying,

"For the life of me, I can't understand why [the press] questioned his sportsmanship. The laws of cricket make it quite clear that the non-striker must keep within his ground until the ball has been delivered. If not, why is the provision there which enables the bowler to run him out? By backing up too far or too early, the non-striker is very obviously gaining an unfair advantage."

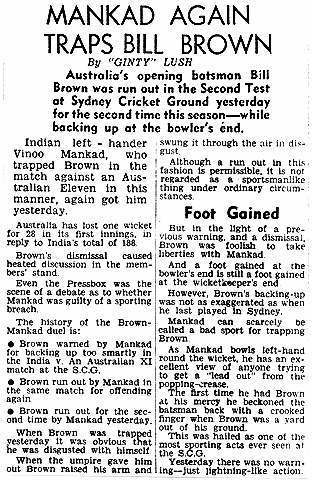
News report of Bill Brown's runout

Match Report

India won the toss this time around, choosing to bat first, and immediately, Australia drew first blood, taking the first wicket of Sarwate while the score was 2, and then the second wicket-this time Mankad, fell at 16. Then after 22 more runs were added, rain interrupted the proceedings, bringing a close to the day's play. The second day started an hour late, but the Indian batsmen were again facing the brunt of a menacing Australian attack, and could not stitch vital partnerships, except for a noteworthy partnership of 70 between Gogumal Kishenchand, and the debutant Phadkar. Eventually, the Indians folded up for 188.

When it was the Australians' turn to bat, the opening pair of Brown and Morris put on a stand of 25, before Brown got Mankaded (Note that the scorecard lists all the victims of mankading as being run out). The third and fourth days' play was washed out, and on the fifth day, the saturated pitch did not help the batsmen much, as Phadkar and Vijay Hazare made most of the conditions, with Hazare scalping Bradman. Phadkar returned with thrifty figures of 3/14 and Hazare's analysis read 4/29 and Australia's innings wrapped up at 107. However, the Australian captain claimed that, "The Indians dismissed us too quickly for their own good. They, in turn, had to now face the unpleasant wicket and were immediately in trouble, losing seven wickets for 61 before stumps."

At the end of the fifth day, the Australian bowlers, Bill Johnston and Ian Johnson showed that they could exploit the conditions just as well, reducing the Indians to seven down; but with a lead of 142, which was a high target on this wicket, the match seemed set for a thrilling finish. However, rain on the final day dispelled any chances of play.

=== 3rd Test ===
1–5 January 1948
Scorecard

Australia	v	India
394 (94.1 overs); Don Bradman 132 (204); Lala Amarnath 4/78 (21 overs)		291/9d (65 overs); Vinoo Mankad 116 (187); Ian Johnson 4/59 (14 overs)
255/4d (65 overs); Don Bradman 127* (169); Lala Amarnath 3/52 (20 overs)		125 (25.7 overs); Gul Mohammad 28 (50); Ian Johnson 4/35 (5.7 overs)

Australia won by 233 runs
Melbourne Cricket Ground, Melbourne
Umpires: Andrew Barlow (Aus) and Herbert Elphinstone (Aus)

- Australia won the toss and elected to bat.
- Eight balls per over.
- Kanwar Rai Singh and Probir Sen (Ind) made their Test debuts.
- 4 January was a rest day.

Match Report

The match scheduled to be held in Melbourne was held almost two weeks after the second test in Sydney, was held and the Indians had already shown some fight in the second match and so they did in the third, albeit in the first innings only. The match started off with the Australians winning the toss and choosing to bat first. Immediately, the Indians got a breakthrough in the form of Barnes' wicket, bowled by Mankad with the score on 29. Then, Arthur Morris, and Don Bradman staged a fightback by stitching together a 70-run partnership, before Morris was bowled by Amarnath for a patient 45 crafted from 123 balls with three fours. Lindsay Hassett entered the fray with the score poised on 99, with his captain, Bradman batting. Hassett was dropped in the slips off Vijay Hazare's bowling when he was batting on 31. This lapse proved too costly for the Indians, because Hassett and Bradman staged a counterattack on the Indian bowlers with some fast scoring, Wisden's own words, Hassett was "scored as fast as his partner", and that, "...at times runs came at two a minute". Hassett's was the third wicket to fall, with the scorecard reading 268, gifting Mankad his second scalp. Then Bradman fell to Phadkar, for 132 scored only off 204 balls at a strike-rate excess of 60. After his dismissal, the wickets were easy to come by, with the last six falling for a mere 105.

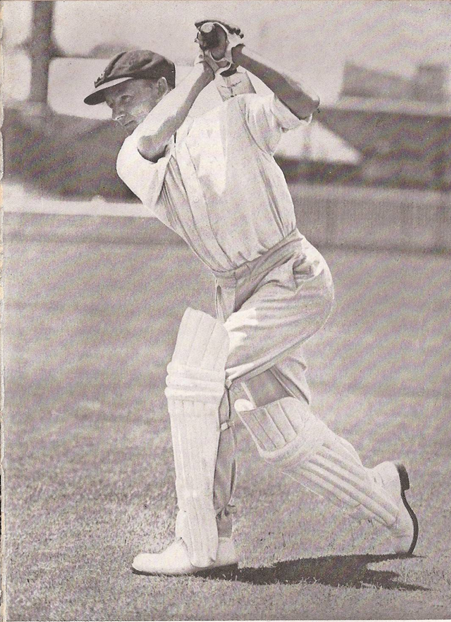
Don Bradman tamed the attack with 132 in the first innings and 127* in the second

The Indians stated their first innings well, with Mankad and Sarwate putting on 124 for the first wicket, before the latter became the first wicket to fall for 36 scored from 84 balls, dismissed by Bill Johnston. Then the next wicket fell at 145, this time it being that of Gul Mohammad, who was caught and bowled by Bruce Dooland, for 12. Mankad and Hazare contributed a stand of 43 before Hazare was dismissed by Sid Barnes. The next ball afterward, the Indian Captain, Amarnath fell for a duck getting out lbw to Barnes, who got his second wicket. The fifth wicket to fall, at 198, was that of Mankad himself, who had contributed a 116, which created history because it was India's first test century against Australia. He was caught by Don Tallon, the wicketkeeper, off Bill Johnston's bowling for a fine 116. Then Adhikari and Phadkar put up a partnership of 62 to bring some respectability to the score before Adhikari was dismissed for 24. Overnight rain made batting difficult, and after three cheap wickets, Amarnath declared even though India were 103 runs behind. To counter the difficult conditions, Bradman sent his tailenders, Dooland, Johnson and Johnston. But when Sid Barnes fell with the score on 32, Wisden noted that Bradman might have felt worried.

However, there was no reason for him to worry, because he and Morris thoroughly "mastered" the attack. They strung together an unbeaten partnership of 223, and while Morris scored at a strike rate of less than 50, Bradman was all speed. He reached his century first and ended up on 127 not out, made only off 169 balls, with a strike rate of more than 75. This meant that for the first time ever in his largely impressive career which had seen him accumulate big numbers, he had scored two centuries in a single test match. Wisden spoke thus:

Bradman added to his long list of triumphs by hitting a hundred in each innings, the first time he had accomplished the feat in a Test match.

Heavy overnight rain made the pitch responsive to spin and Bradman seizing this opportunity, declared, setting the Indians a target of 337. The Indians fared poorly in the second innings, with only Gul Mohammad and Kanwar Rai Singh making any noteworthy contributions, scoring 28 and 24. Singh stuck around giving a few lust hits here and there, but unfortunately for India, they folded up at 125, a score which seemed probable when they lost half of their side with just 60 runs on the board. Noteworthy performers for Australia were Bradman, Morris, Johnston, Johnson and Hassett. The Indians had some good individual performances in the form of Mankad and Amarnath, the former putting up a good all-round show, while the latter, picking up a match haul of 7 for 130.

=== 4th Test ===
23–28 January 1948
Scorecard

Australia	v	India
674 (151.3 overs); Don Bradman 201 (296); CR Rangachari 4/141 (41 overs)		381 (109.1 overs); Dattu Phadkar 123 (284); Ian Johnson 4/64 (23.1 overs)
		277 (f/o) (92.5 overs); Vijay Hazare 145 (372); Ray Lindwall 7/38 (16.5 overs)

Australia won by an innings and 16 runs
Adelaide Oval, Adelaide
Umpires: George Borwick (Aus) and Ron Wright (Aus)

- Australia won the toss and elected to bat.
- Eight balls per over.
- C. R. Rangachari (Ind) and Neil Harvey (Aus) made their Test debuts.
- 25 January was a rest day.

Match Report

After being defeated by a heavy margin of 223 runs and an innings pasting, India still had a chance of winning the remaining two tests to avoid a series defeat, but that was too much to ask against the Invincibles, who were the better team in all respects. This test was the debut test of future Australian great, Neil Harvey. The toss was won by the Australians and on a pitch that was perfectly conductive for batting, Bradman chose to bat first.

The other Australian centurion in the previous match, Morris, was the first wicket to fall, bowled by Phadkar when the scorecard read 20. After that, his opening partner, Sid Barnes, and Bradman did not give the Indians a chance and controlled the proceedings from then, putting on 236 runs for the second wicket before Barnes perished for a "faultless" 112. He had not offered a single chance in his entire innings except when on 61, dropped by second slip. Bradman was once again the bane of the Indian bowlers, and he, along with Hassett, the next batsman (who had, incidentally put on another huge partnership with Bradman in the previous test) added 105 runs for the third wicket before Bradman fell to Hazare, for the second time in his test-career, for a masterful and dominant 201 which contained a six and 21 fours. Hassett, and Keith Miller added 142 runs more to the score, by hitting aggressively and freely. During their dominant and fast scoring spree, Hassett, quickly scoured past his highest score of 128 and was well on his way to an excellent and combative 198 before he ran out of partners. The rest of the batting order made 171 runs more for the loss of 6 wickets after Miller's dismissal for the fourth wicket. Australia were finally all out for 674, their highest total in the series.

When it was the Indians' turn to bat, they made a shocking start to their innings, losing two wickets for just six runs, but they fought back well from that perilous position, to add 127 more runs, albeit at the cost of three wickets. Their overall position, 5 for 133, was not too encouraging, but Vijay Hazare and Dattu Phadkar added 188 runs for the sixth wicket. Phadkar contributed a fine 123 against an Australian attack that had Lindwall Miller, Johnson and Johnston among others. However, the man who was the centre of attraction was Hazare, who cracked a classical and orthodox 116 to provide some resistance before the Indian lower-order crumpled, as their last four batsmen totalled only 20 runs. The only other Indian batsmen who really made any impact were Vinoo Mankad, who made 156-ball 49, which spanned 139 minutes-2 hours and 19 minutes, and Lala Amarnath, who hit a fast, 46, only off 47 balls, which had five hits to the fence. However, India succumbed to a strong Australian attack, which bowled them out for 381 – 293 runs behind. It was a staggering margin of lead and victories after follow-on were rare. The Indians started even worse this time around, losing two wickets quickly for no runs on the board. It was then that Hazare played an innings which made a contemporary daily speak thus:

"It didn't matter what the ball was, on or outside the off stump, what its height or pace, it was played with amazing certainty ... It was a display of batsmanship, which has very seldom been equalled, certainly not surpassed and never dwarfed. It was not so much the pace at which the ball travelled. It was the supreme artistry of it all."

In fact, the innings was so widely acclaimed that everything else was overshadowed, even Bradman's 201. Hazare later came to recall in an interview that his two centuries in the test were the second most prominent memories of the tour after his wicket of Bradman's in the rain-marred, low scoring Sydney test.

In another interview with Boria Majumdar in October, noted cricket historian, Hazare claimed that:

"Bradman seemed impressed with my batting and we became really close friends since. Some years on, he even found time to write a foreword for my book."

This was a notable achievement, given the strength of Australia's bowling attack, which was widely regarded as comparable to its batting. The bowling attack included Keith Miller, an all-rounder capable of producing outstanding performances with both bat and ball; Ray Lindwall, who was regarded as one of the leading fast bowlers of his era; and Ian Johnson and Bill Johnston, who were both important members of the team. Hazare's innings was regarded as enhancing both his own reputation and that of Indian cricket. In the process, Hazare emulated Bradman, who achieved the same feat in the previous Test.

His effort was backed up by Hemu Adhikari's first half-century of the series, 51. Adhikari lent Hazare valuable support and the two batsmen added 132 runs, but the end came soon enough when the Indian tailenders succumbed to Lindwall's pace, as the last three wickets fell for six runs. Australia inflicted another innings defeat to seal a well-deserved series win, but Hazare emerged with his head held high due to his personal triumph. However, the Australian team was too good for the Indians.

=== 5th Test ===
6–10 February 1948
Scorecard

Australia	v	India
575/8d (128 overs); Neil Harvey 153 (251); Vinoo Mankad 2/107 (33 overs)		331 (123 overs); Vinoo Mankad 111 (309); Len Johnson 3/66 (30 overs)
		67 (f/o) (24.2 overs); Hemu Adhikari 17 (44); Len Johnson 3/8 (5.2 overs)

Australia won by an innings and 177 runs
Melbourne Cricket Ground, Melbourne
Umpires: Andrew Barlow (Aus) and George Cooper (Aus)

- Australia won the toss and elected to bat.
- Eight balls per over.
- Len Johnson, Sam Loxton and Doug Ring (Aus) made their Test debuts.
- 8 February was a rest day.

Match report

The fifth and the final test match was a dead rubber, ultimately, and this match began with one final opportunity for the Indian team to translate their individual performances into solid teamwork. The Australians on the other hand, had already won two successive matches against the tourists and their team had also gelled as one unit. Not only did their captain, Bradman lead with example, but the other team members also proved themselves equally adept. So this match saw the Indians playing with their honour at stake.

Bradman's luck with the coin toss continued in the series, as he won the toss and chose to bat first for the fourth occasion out of five. The Australian openers put on 48 runs before Sid Barnes was run out brilliantly by Adhikari. As usual, Bradman came out to bat at one-down and along with Bill Brown, he added 92 runs for the third wicket before something unfortunate for Australia happened. Bradman discovered that he had torn a rib muscle and was unable to play freely, so he retired hurt at 140/1. Brown was unaffected by this situation and carved a three-hour, twenty-five-minute 99, from 216 balls. Again he too was run out, but the other Australian batsmen scored handily. Sam Loxton, making his debut, scored a 155-ball 80, Lindwall, Tallon(the wicket-keeper), Len Johnson, and Bill Johnston contributed to the huge scoreline.

However, the chief honours went to the nineteen-year, four-month old Neil Harvey, who muscled a powerful 153, with one five and eleven fours. He ended the first day on 78, and then hit his century on 7 February 1948. He had been promoted to no.5 in the match and it was effectively a just reward for his promotion. He surpassed Archie Jackson's record of being the youngest centurion for Australia, a record that still stands. His innings was absolutely flawless except for a chance which he gave the Indian fielders shortly before he was dismissed.

Sarwate fell for the first wicket at 3/1 when the Indians began to bat. However, Mankad and Adhikari batted well to bail India out of the crisis, adding 124 for the second wicket before Adhikari fell for 38, made from 202 balls with a solitary boundary. Fresh from his previous match heroics, Hazare came out to bat with Mankad and they put on 79 before Mankad fell for his second century of the series, a well-crafted, five-hour 111. Then Hazare fell for the fifth wicket after a fine 74. The other batsmen except for Phadkar, who made 56 not out, did not survive much longer, as India's batting yet again folded up for a limp display after a strong revival by Hazare and Mankad. Ultimately, India followed on by 244 runs and this time, in their second innings neither Mankad nor Hazare could save their necks as their batting put up a weak performance to be all out for 67. Adhikari top-scored with 17, but other than his "resistance", no other Indian batsmen quite managed to occupy the crease and grind out a draw. The two Australian debutants, Doug Ring and Len Johnson had a field day, picking up twelve wickets between them. While Johnson took 6/74, including 3/8 in the second innings, Ring took 6/120. Johnson went on to play only one more test after that, while Ring went on to become a useful allrounder for the Australian team. This capped a miserable tour for the Indian team, who could, "with reason, complain of ill-fortune in most of the matches."

== The Tour ==
This tour can best be remembered for being India's first tour to Australia and also for being Bradman's last test series at home and his second last series. It was perhaps because of this that it was assumed that the Indians were actually keen to watch Bradman play. Even though India capitulated for scores less than hundred four times on the tour, their batsmen performed well individually. In fact, Dattu Phadkar, who cracked a century in fourth test, and hit three fifties as well, headed the averages. Vijay Hazare became a sensation after his two centuries in the same match. Vinoo Mankad hit two centuries, in the third and fifth tests, however, it was the failure from an experienced campaigner and their team captain Lala Amarnath, which hastened the team's heavy loss.

On paper, it was a strong Indian team which included the likes of Mankad, Hazare, Amarnath and CS Nayudu. But these players never performed collectively, which was what the Australians did. Don Bradman accumulated runs better than before, and his average in this series of 178.75 was nearly the double of his career average. He was the series' top run-scorer. While ray Lindwall, was the series' highest wicket-taker with 18 wickets. For India, Vijay Hazare scored 429 runs and Lala Amarnath took 13 wickets from six innings. However, Amarnath's string of poor scores with the bat cost India the services of another specialist batsman, who could have at least reduced the margins of defeat.

The Australians, on the other hand coordinated perfectly as a unit: their batsmen piled up big scores and their bowlers ran through the Indian lineup, evident by the fact that the Indians never scored more than 400 in the whole test series.

Moreover, the series also magnified the deficit of a strike bowler in India who could take wickets regularly and could contain the run-flow. Don Bradman noted:

"I first saw them play in Adelaide when South Australia were their opponents. I made a century in this match, and in doing so formed the conclusion that our Test team would make a lot of runs against them for two reasons,...Firstly, their bowling, whilst reasonably steady and sound, lacked a really fast bowler, and what is probably more important, a really high-class spinner. Secondly, to my surprise, they were weak in the field."

It was of the opinion that this side was one of India's strongest to play, but Rusi Modi, Vijay Merchant, Mushtaq Ali and Fazal Mahmood all missed the tour, which crippled India, because Modi and Merchant were India's most reliable batsmen on all types of pitches and surfaces. They also lost a strike bowler, which Fazal Mahmood would go on to become for Pakistan.

Amarnath's lack of success with the bat (140 runs at 14.00 in 10 innings) was an aberration from his performances in the tour, where he scored 1162 runs at an average of 58.10, and picked up 30 wickets. The 228 he made against Victoria in the tour matches was described as "one of the greatest ever played" in Australia, by a recognized member of Bill Woodfull's 1932 Bodyline side, Victor Richardson. His captaincy was also said to have been criticised for the frequent changes he made in the batting order, but all the players were reported to have unanimously agreed that his management was fine. Bradman also had written thus of his captaincy, describing an incident when he was playing for the Australian XI side against India in the first-class matches, when he was batting on 99, and Amarnath brought on Gogumal Kishenchand to bowl.

"He had not bowled before and I had no idea what type of bowler he was. It was a shrewd move, as one could have so easily been deceived, but I treated him with the greatest respect until eventually came a single to mid-on and the greatest moment had arrived."

Hazare, Mankad and Phadkar were given praises by Wisden. Wisden asserted that Mankad proved his credentials as the best allrounder of his generation. His left-arm spin brought him 61 wickets on the tour. Hazare's achievement of hitting two back-to-back centuries in the Adelaide test was describe as the series' best performances. He was only the second Indian to score 1000 runs on the tour. Dattu Phadkar was hailed as being the "fastest" Indian bowler. But his achievement of topping the averages for India with 52.33 was mentioned as being a "welcome surprise". His 123 in the fourth test was described as a capital century.

This series was also one in the line of many memorable tests between India and Australia.

== Annual reviews ==
- Wisden Cricketers' Almanack 1949
