= William Dean (Somerset cricketer) =

English cricketer

Personal information
- Full name: William Frederick Dean
- Born: 3 January 1926; Leeds, Yorkshire
- Died: 18 September 1994 (aged 68); York, Yorkshire
- Batting: Right-handed
- Bowling: Right-arm fast-medium
- Role: Bowler

Domestic team information
- Years: Team
- 1952: Somerset
- Only FC: 28 May 1952 Somerset v Indians

Career statistics
Competition	First-class
Matches	1
Runs scored	21
Batting average	21.00
100s/50s	0/0
Top score	21
Balls bowled	60
Wickets	0
Bowling average	–
5 wickets in innings	–
10 wickets in match	–
Best bowling	–
Catches/stumpings	0/–
- Source: CricketArchive, 4 June 2008

William Frederick Dean (3 January 1926 – 18 September 1994) was a cricketer who played one first-class match for Somerset in 1952 and whose identity remained mysterious for many years until the publication of a book in 2018. Earlier publications and cricket websites had equated Dean with another Yorkshireman, a William Henry Dean, born in Leeds on 25 November 1928 with no known date of death.

Dean was a right-handed batsman and a right-arm fast-medium bowler. Along with fellow Yorkshireman Malcolm Walker, he was picked by Somerset for the match against the touring Indian side at the County Ground, Taunton from 28 May 1952. Somerset batted first and reached 193 for eight wickets when Dean batted at No 10, joining all-rounder Johnny Lawrence, who had recommended him to the county. The pair put on 133 for the ninth wicket, only 13 short of the county side's then ninth wicket record, and Lawrence made an unbeaten 103, his first century after six years of county cricket. Dean made 21 before being bowled by Vijay Hazare.

When the Indians batted, Dean opened the bowling, but spin bowlers took the wickets. In Somerset's second innings, Dean came in just before the declaration and was unbeaten without scoring. He again failed to take wickets in India's second innings, bowling four overs for just four runs.

This match proved to be Dean's only taste of first-class cricket. Somerset had scope to offer only one special registration contract, and it went to Walker, whose batting had failed but who had taken three wickets; Dean departed the county and never played first-class cricket again.

== Identification and later life ==
Authors Stephen Hill and Barry Phillips, writing a series of books outlining the lives of all Somerset first-class cricketers, discovered that the man commonly held to be William Dean the Somerset cricketer was never a cricketer at all, and set about finding the real person. William Frederick Dean, the correct player, was identified through contact with a surviving daughter and she supplied the authors with details and photographs.

According to the book, Dean had a complicated sporting and personal life. He played good standard league cricket and, like Walker, impressed Johnny Lawrence at Lawrence's cricket school at Rothwell enough to suggest the trial for Somerset; having failed that, he became a professional at Stockport Cricket Club and other northern clubs, but his long-term career was in accountancy and in a range of businesses including betting shops and a fishing bait enterprise. His private life became more tangled when, married with a daughter, he eloped with the sixteen-year-old daughter of a farmer, and then further complicated when, because of a dodgy business deal, he felt obliged to change his name to "Bill Barrett" by deed poll; under this new name, he opened a Yorkshire jazz club, performing himself on the saxophone. He died in a hospice in York at the age of 68 from cancer of the oesophagus and sternum brought on, his family believed, by a blow to the chest from a cricket ball in his youth.
