= Australian cricket team in New Zealand in 1949–50 =

International cricket tour

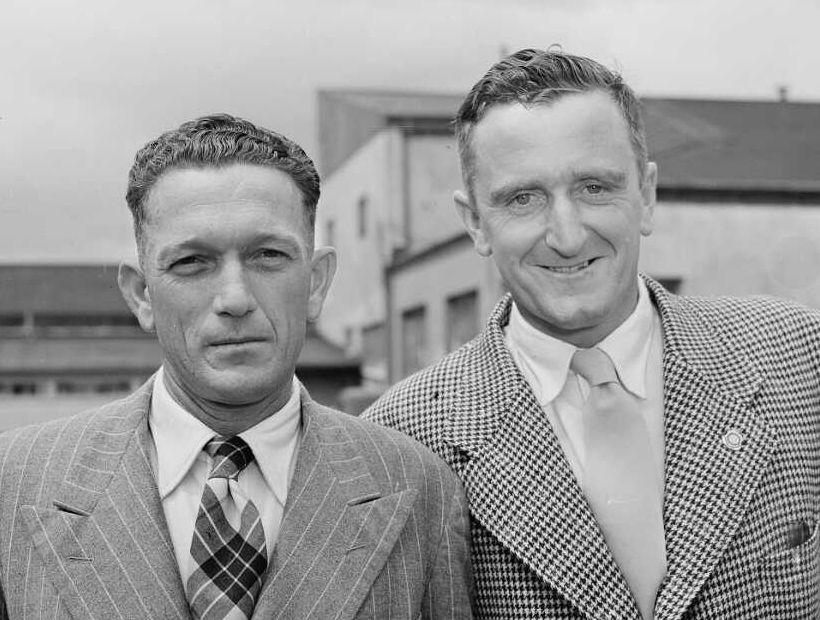
Don Tallon and Jack Iverson during the tour

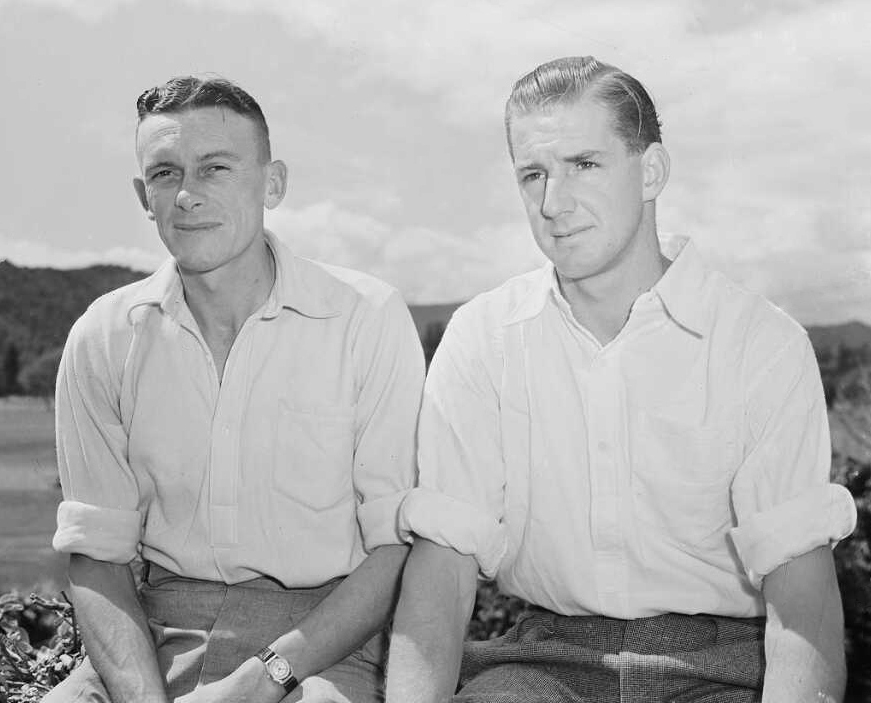
Phil Ridings and Wally Driver during the tour

While the Australian Test team was touring South Africa in the 1949–50 season, another Australian team captained by Bill Brown played 14 matches in New Zealand between February and April 1950, five of which were first-class. These included one match against the New Zealand national cricket team, but this was not granted Test status.

== The team ==
- Bill Brown (captain)
- Jim Burke
- Alan Davidson
- Wally Driver
- Lance Duldig
- Roy Howard
- Jack Iverson
- Len Johnson
- Ken Meuleman
- Charlie Puckett
- Phil Ridings
- Doug Ring
- Stan Sismey
- Don Tallon

The manager was George Davies. The average age of the team was 29; some Australian critics thought the selectors should have looked to the future and chosen more young players. Of the nine players in the team who had not played Test cricket, only Burke, Davidson and Iverson later played Tests for Australia.

== The tour ==
The Australians beat Canterbury by 10 wickets, Otago by an innings and Wellington also by an innings, and drew against Auckland.

The match against New Zealand in Dunedin was affected by rain on the second day and ended in a draw. New Zealand batted first and made 231, Doug Ring taking 7 for 88 and Tony MacGibbon, playing his first match for New Zealand, top-scoring with 65 at number seven. Australia were 105 for 5 in reply when Don Tallon came to the crease; he scored 116 in three hours with eight fours and seven sixes, and Australia made 299. Fen Cresswell took 8 for 100 off 48.3 overs. New Zealand then lost wickets quickly and were 67 for 9, still one run in arrears with 15 minutes to play, when Cresswell joined the New Zealand captain, Walter Hadlee. They stayed together till time expired with the score at 76 for 9.

The Australians won all nine minor matches, seven of them by an innings. Only one century was scored against them during the whole tour, by Noel McMahon for Waikato. In the first-class matches the Australian spin bowler Jack Iverson took 25 wickets at an average of 12.88, but in all matches he took 75 wickets at only 7.7.
