= International cricket in 1952 =

International cricket season

The 1952 International cricket season was from April 1957 to August 1957, which consisted only a single international tour.

== Season overview ==
International tours
Start date	Home team	Away team	Results [Matches]			
Start date	Home team	Away team	Test	ODI	FC	LA
5 June 1952	England	India	3–0 [4]	—	—	—

== June ==
=== India in England ===
Test series
No.	Date	Home captain	Away captain	Venue	Result
Test 351	5–9 June	Leonard Hutton	Vijay Hazare	Headingley Cricket Ground, Leeds	England by 7 wickets
Test 352	19–24 June	Leonard Hutton	Vijay Hazare	Lord's, London	England by 8 wickets
Test 353	17–19 July	Leonard Hutton	Vijay Hazare	Old Trafford Cricket Ground, Manchester	England by an innings and 207 runs
Test 354	14–19 August	Leonard Hutton	Vijay Hazare	Kennington Oval, London	Match drawn
