= Johnny Lawrence (cricketer) =

English cricketer (1911–1988)

Personal information
- Full name: John Lawrence
- Born: 29 March 1911; Carlton, Leeds, England
- Died: 10 December 1988 (aged 77); Toulston, Tadcaster, Yorkshire, England
- Batting: Right-handed
- Bowling: Right-arm leg-break
- Role: All-rounder
- Relatives: Miles Lawrence (son)

Domestic team information
- Years: Team
- 1946–1955: Somerset
- 1958–1967: Lincolnshire
- FC debut: 11 May 1946 Somerset v Essex
- Last FC: 1 September 1955 Somerset v Sussex
- Only LA: 4 May 1966 Lincolnshire v Hampshire

Career statistics
Competition	First-class	List A
Matches	283	1
Runs scored	9,185	2
Batting average	20.50	–
100s/50s	3/46	0/0
Top score	122	2*
Balls bowled	39,355	42
Wickets	798	0
Bowling average	24.97	–
5 wickets in innings	40	–
10 wickets in match	4	–
Best bowling	8/41	–
Catches/stumpings	262/–	0/–
- Source: CricketArchive, 30 May 2020

John Lawrence (29 March 1911 – 10 December 1988) was a diminutive Yorkshire-born cricketing all-rounder whose middle or lower order batting and leg-break and googly bowling were of great importance to Somerset in the 10 cricket seasons immediately after the Second World War.

== Early career and playing style ==
Born at Carlton, Leeds, on 29 March 1911, Lawrence made his name in the Bradford Cricket League in the 1930s, but was not able to break into the strong Yorkshire side, though he played Second Eleven cricket at Minor Counties level. He qualified by residence to play for Somerset at the end of 1939 but then had to wait until after World War II before making his debut, by which time he was 35 years old.

Short and enthusiastic, Lawrence was a pugnacious batsman who, according to one account, "could on occasions bat with irremovable resolve". As a bowler, in the description of the cricket writer Alan Gibson, Lawrence was "one of the slowest bowlers I have ever seen. There were times when he would deliberately bowl slower and slower, until he almost reached the state of Sir James Barrie, who declared that he could bowl a ball so slow that if he did not like the look of it he could run after it and catch it."

== First-class cricketer ==
Lawrence was an instant success in Somerset's 1946 side, winning his county cap in his first season, scoring 968 first-class runs and taking 66 wickets. The wickets were fewer and more expensive in 1947, but he took his first five-wicket haul in an innings with six for 53 against Hampshire at Weston-super-Mare. At the end of the 1947 season, though a Somerset player, he was picked for the North team in the regular North v South match at Harrogate.

The 1948 season saw the start of Lawrence's best bowling years, though his batting fell away. His aggregate of wickets rose from 45 in 1947 to 82, and the bowling average fell from more than 36 runs per wicket to just 22. His two best bowling performances came against Yorkshire, with six for 29 in the match at Harrogate followed by six for 35 in the return match at Taunton. At the end of the season, he played for an England XI in a match at Cardiff Arms Park to celebrate Glamorgan's first County Championship, the only non-Test player in the side. But that and the North v South match the previous year remained the extent of his representative cricket.

In 1949, he took 100 wickets for the first time, finishing with 107 at a bowling average of 22.73, but his batting declined even further and he finished without a single 50 to his name all season and with a batting average of less than 14 runs per innings. His eight for 63 in an innings against Hampshire at Portsmouth was the best return of his career so far. But he bettered that performance and his wickets tally the following season, 1950. Against Worcestershire at Worcester, he took eight for 41 on a rain-affected pitch, and these remained the best bowling figures of his career. They contributed to a total of 115 wickets which was not only his highest season aggregate but also, with a bowling average of 18.90, the best season's figures of his career. Moreover, in 1950 his batting form returned and he scored 981 runs, the nearest he came in his career to the all-rounder's "double" of 1,000 runs and 100 wickets in an English cricket season.

A contributory factor in his bowling success was his understanding with the Somerset wicketkeeper, Harold Stephenson. Somerset's cricket historian described it thus: "The prodigious leg-break would beat the bat and 'Steve' would knock off the bails with the merest flick. The glee on Lawrence's face as an exasperated batsman pounded forward and missed..."

== Senior professional ==
Lawrence turned 40 in March 1951 and over the remaining five years of his first-class career there was a subtle change in his role as a Somerset cricketer. Reliable throughout for 70 or more wickets a season, he never passed 100 again, though he got close with 93 in 1954. But his batting continued to develop and was increasingly important in a side whose frailties in every department consigned it to the foot of the County Championship for four consecutive seasons from 1952 to 1955. He was also a fine slip fielder.

In 1951, he scored 1,000 runs in a season for the first time, reaching 1067 at an average of less than 21. The following year, 1952, his average rose to 25 on the back of a lot of not-out innings, and he missed the 1,000 runs. But in this season he scored the first two centuries of his career. His first was an unbeaten 103 against the Indians at Taunton, when he batted at No 9 and shared a ninth-wicket partnership of 133 with William Dean, whose only first-class match this was. It was the 306th innings of Lawrence's first-class career, and two months later, again batting at No 9, he followed it with a second century, 111, made against Essex at Taunton. He was Somerset's leading wicket-taker too in 1952, but his 78 wickets cost 30.45 runs each.

The bowling return in 1953 was similar, with 70 wickets at 31.77, and the weakness in Somerset's batting rather than any advance in Lawrence's skills led to him being used further up the batting order than in other seasons, even, for a period, opening the innings alongside the long-standing opener Harold Gimblett. He passed 1,000 runs for the season again, though he averaged marginally less than 20 runs an innings.

Lawrence was awarded a benefit match by Somerset in 1954, and though the match itself was spoilt by rain, the benefit fund eventually reached £3,000. This was despite the fact that, as a strict Methodist, Lawrence refused to allow any Sunday matches to be arranged for his benefit. He also forbade any raffles to be organised for his benefit. In the 1954 cricket season itself, Lawrence responded by making 929 runs and taking 93 wickets, nearer to the elusive double than in any other season apart from 1950. Moreover, the cost of the wickets fell significantly, to 20.66 runs per wicket. For the third consecutive year, he was Somerset's leading wicket-taker.

The 1955 season saw the start of a transition in the Somerset side, and the reliance on Lawrence lessened. He still took more than 70 wickets with his leg-spin, and his batting aggregate, at 1128, was his highest for a season. When he made 122 in a second innings follow-on that saved the match for Somerset against Worcestershire at Worcester, he made the highest score of his entire first-class career. Yet within a month, he had asked to be released from his county contract and he left the Somerset staff at the end of the season.

== After county cricket ==
As part of its programme to revive after four years at the foot of the County Championship, Somerset had been looking far and wide for new players, and among the arrivals in the next couple of seasons were the Australians Colin McCool and Bill Alley, both of whom had been playing Lancashire League cricket. Lawrence went in the other direction: he left Somerset after the 1955 season and took up a contract to be the professional at Haslingden Cricket Club for 1956. Haslingden finished at the bottom of the league that season and Lawrence did not return for the 1957 season.

In 1958, he started playing Minor Counties cricket for Lincolnshire and stayed with the side for 10 years, playing his final match for the side at the age of 56 in 1967. The year before, 1966, Lincolnshire qualified for the Gillette Cup List A competition, where the team played Hampshire in a first round match at Southampton that ran into a second day. Lawrence bowled seven overs without taking a wicket and made 2 not out as his side lost by 31 runs.

While playing for Lincolnshire, Lawrence resumed his career in the Bradford Cricket League, and he also ran indoor cricket schools in Yorkshire at Lordswood and Rothwell, where among the cricketers he coached was Geoffrey Boycott.

He died at Toulston near Tadcaster on 10 December 1988, aged 77.

== Family ==
Johnny was married to Mary (née Clarkson) who played a crucial role in the cricket school, supporting his career, and raising their family. Johnny and Mary had six children, Miles, Pauline, Susan, Robin, Dinah and Stephen, and 11 grandchildren. Lawrence's son, Miles Lawrence, also a right-handed batsman and leg-break bowler, played 18 first-class matches for Somerset between 1959 and 1961. A younger son, Stephen, played Minor Counties cricket for Cheshire.

== Character ==
Even Wisden noted that Lawrence was a "cheerful" cricketer. The history of Somerset cricket put it at greater length: "His cheerful disposition was much to the liking of the dressing-room occupants, though his non-conformist attitudes, including his much-voiced disapproval of what is quaintly called industrial language, could be a little too inhibiting for those with a bent for freewheeling linguistics at the end of an unrewarding afternoon in the sun."

Another admirer wrote: "He was a jolly, kindly man, and perhaps the biggest contribution he made to Somerset cricket was his laughter and comradeship in the dressing room, at a time when things were generally going wrong."
