= Andy Barlow =

Andrew Barlow or Andy Barlow may refer to:

- Andrew Barlow (1899–1961), Australian cricket umpire
- Andrew Henry Barlow (1837–1915), politician in Queensland, Australia
- Andy Barlow (footballer) (born 1965), English former professional footballer
- Andy Barlow (producer), British music producer
