= George Cooper (umpire) =

Australian cricket umpire (1907–1980)

George Stephen Cooper (1 September 1907 – 29 December 1980) was an Australian cricket Test match umpire.

Cooper umpired 13 first-class matches between 1946 and 1951: 11 matches played by South Australia in Adelaide, and two Tests, both in Melbourne. His first Test was between Australia and India at the Melbourne Cricket Ground on 6 February to 10 February 1948, a match won by Australia by an innings. Cooper's partner in this match was Andy Barlow. His other Test was the second match of the series between Australia and England at the Melbourne Cricket Ground on 22 December to 27 December 1950, won narrowly by Australia with no innings reaching 200. Ron Wright was the other umpire.

Cooper died at Adelaide, South Australia.

== See also ==
- Australian Test Cricket Umpires
- List of test umpires
