= Indian cricket team in England in 1952 =

International cricket tour

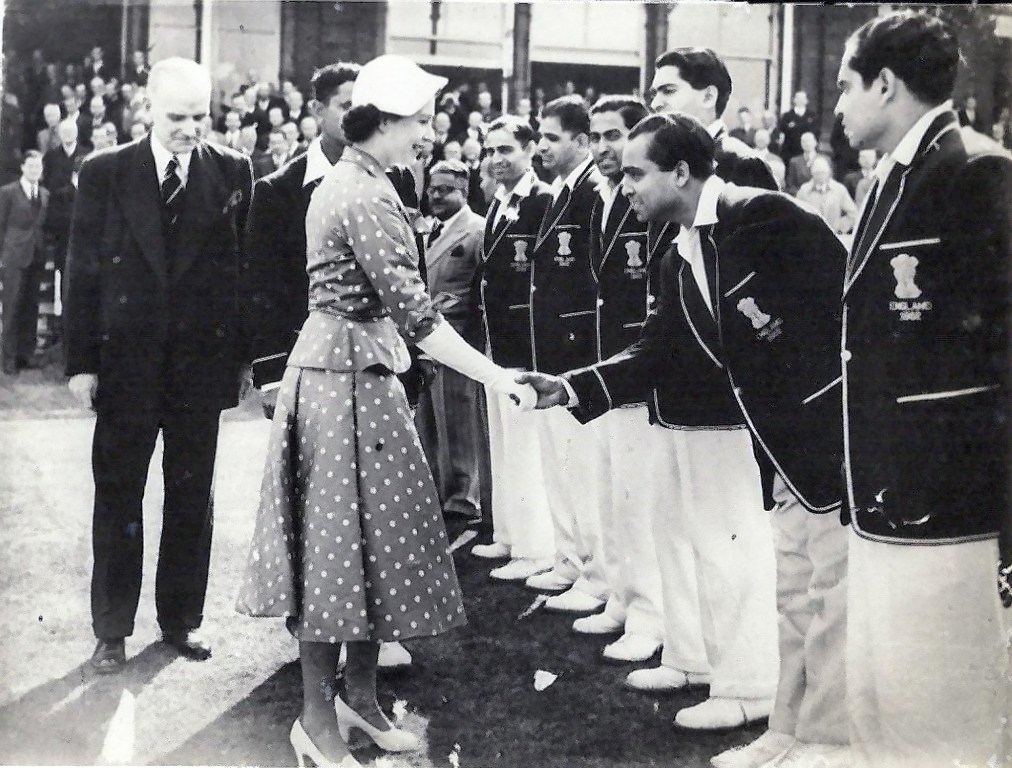
The Indian team meets Queen Elizabeth II at Lord's Cricket Ground, 23 June 1952

The Indian cricket team toured England in the 1952 season. The team played four Test matches, losing three of them and drawing the other one. In all first-class matches, they played 29, winning four and losing five, with the rest drawn. At the first Test in Headingley, India lost four wickets for no runs at the start of their second innings.

This was the first tour of India to England after Independence from United Kingdom

== The Indian team ==
There were 17 players in the original touring team, and Vinoo Mankad was co-opted from the Lancashire League team Haslingden for three of the four Test matches. The side was captained by Vijay Hazare.

== The Test matches ==
All the Test matches were played over five days, up from three days in the previous Indian tours of England.

=== First Test ===
5–9 June 1952
Scorecard
scorecard

India	v	England
293 (126.3 overs); Vijay Manjrekar 133; Jim Laker 4/39 (22.3 overs)		334 (165.2 overs); Tom Graveney 71; Ghulam Ahmed 5/100 (63 overs)
165 (67 overs); Dattu Phadkar 64; Fred Trueman 4/27 (9 overs)		128/3 (55 overs); Reg Simpson 51; Ghulam Ahmed 2/37 (22 overs)

England won by 7 wickets
Headingley, Leeds
Umpires: Herbert Baldwin and Harry Elliott

- India won the toss and decided to bat.
  - Fred Trueman (Eng), Datta Gaekwad and G. S. Ramchand (Ind) made their Test debuts.
- 8 June was a rest day.

=== Second Test ===
19–24 June 1952
scorecard

India	v	England
235 (94.3 overs); Vinoo Mankad 72; Fred Trueman 4/72 (25 overs)		537 (206.4 overs); Len Hutton 150; Vinoo Mankad 5/196 (73 overs)
378 (122 overs); Vinoo Mankad 184; Jim Laker 4/102 (39 overs)		79/2 (49.2 overs); Len Hutton 39; Ghulam Ahmed 1/31 (23.2 overs)

England won by 8 wickets
Lord's Cricket Ground
Umpires: Frank Chester, Frank Lee

- India won the toss and decided to bat.
  - 22 June was a rest day.

=== Third Test ===
17–19 July 1952
scorecard

England	v	India
347/9 (d) (144 overs); Len Hutton 104; Ghulam Ahmed 3/43 (9 overs)		58 (21.4 overs); Vijay Manjrekar 22; Fred Trueman 8/31 (8.4 overs)
		82 (36.3 overs); Hemu Adhikari 27; Alec Bedser 5/27 (15 overs)

England won by an innings and 207 runs
Old Trafford, Manchester
Umpires: Dai Davies and Frank Lee

- England won the toss and decided to bat.
- Tony Lock (Eng) made his Test debut.
- India became the first team to be dismissed twice in one day.

=== Fourth Test ===
14–19 August 1952
Scorecard

England	v	India
326/6d (154 overs); David Sheppard 119; Vinoo Mankad 2/88 (48 overs)		98 (38.5 overs); Vijay Hazare 38; Alec Bedser 5/41 (14.5 overs)

Match drawn
Kennington Oval, Kennington
Umpires: Frank Chester and Harry Elliott

- England won the toss and decided to bat.
- 17 August was a rest day.

India were at 49/5 at the end of second day. The third day was washed out. On fourth day, only 65 minutes were played, during which India were all out for 98, third consecutive innings that they failed to reach 100. Hutton asked them to follow-on. But no further play was possible that day, and the fifth and last day was also completely washed out.

== Annual reviews ==
- Playfair Cricket Annual 1953
- Wisden Cricketers' Almanack 1953
