= Dattu Phadkar =

Indian cricketer (1925–1985)

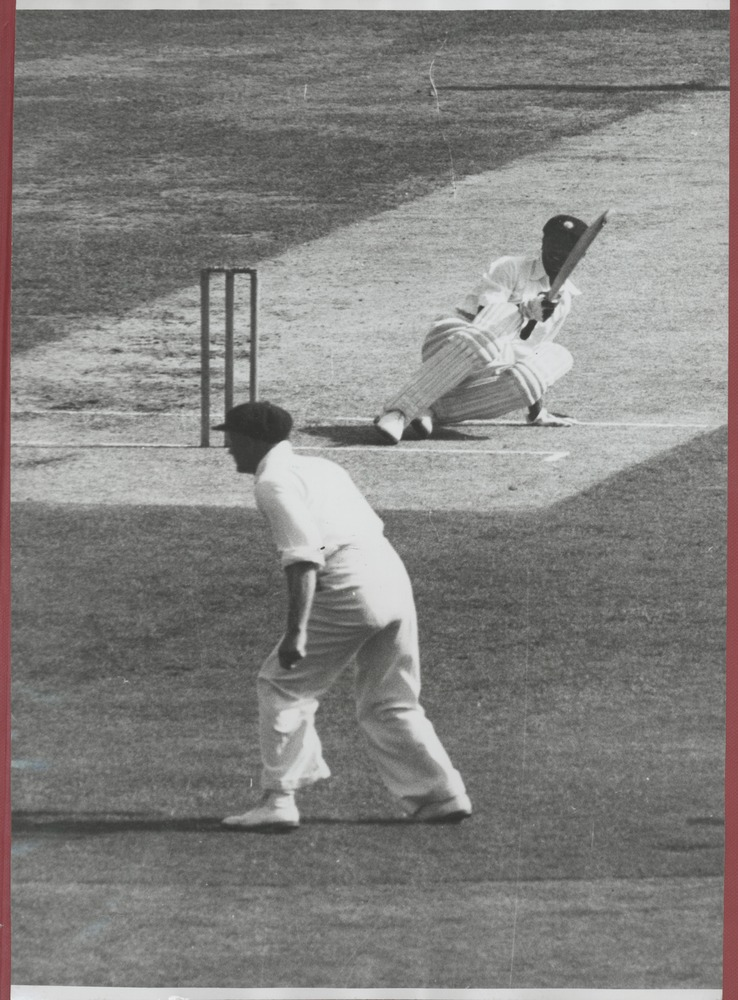
- Phadkar slips over on the pitch when trying to hook a short ball from W. Johnston, 1947

Personal information
- Full name: Dattatraya Gajanan Phadkar
- Born: 12 December 1925; Kolhapur, British India
- Died: 17 March 1985 (aged 59); Madras, Tamil Nadu, India
- Batting: Right-handed
- Bowling: Right-arm fast-medium; Right-arm off-break

International information
- National side: India
- Test debut (cap 41): 12 December 1947 v Australia
- Last Test: 31 December 1958 v West Indies

Career statistics
Competition	Test	First-class
Matches	31	133
Runs scored	1,229	5,377
Batting average	32.24	36.08
100s/50s	2/8	8/29
Top score	123	217
Balls bowled	5,994	26,221
Wickets	62	465
Bowling average	36.85	22.09
5 wickets in innings	3	31
10 wickets in match	0	3
Best bowling	7/159	7/26
Catches/stumpings	21/–	92/–
- Source: ESPNcricinfo, 10 January 2013

Dattatraya Gajanan "Dattu" Phadkar (12 December 1925 – 17 March 1985) was an all-rounder who represented India in Test cricket.

Phadkar was an attacking middle order batsman, a medium pace bowler who could swing the ball both ways and extract life from the wicket, and usually fielded in the slips. He was one of the cricketing heart-throbs of his day.

Phadkar was educated in Bombay in the Robert Money High School and took a B.A. degree from Elphinstone College. At the age of 10, he scored 156 in an inter-school match. He represented Bombay University at cricket between 1941/42 and 1946/47. On his collegiate debut, he hit 274, which was then a record. He underwent training at Alf Gover's cricket school.

Picked for the Indian tour of Australia in 1947/48, Phadkar shone more with the bat than the ball. On his debut on a difficult wicket at Sydney he hit 51 while batting at eight and took 3 for 14. Promoted to No.6, he scored 123 at Adelaide and added a record 188 for the sixth wicket with Vijay Hazare. Phadkar went on to top the batting averages and scored at least a fifty in all the four Tests that he played.

Next year against West Indies at Madras, Phadkar took 7 for 159 which remained his best figures in Tests. But his efforts at bowling bouncers in this match led to the West Indian bowlers reacting in kind and the defeat of India. In the exciting last Test where India needed 361 and ended up six runs short, Phadkar hit 37 not out.

His other major innings was 115 against England in 1951/52. When India lost disastrously in England in 1952, he was one of the few players to come out with some credit. At Headingley where India lost the first four wickets before scoring a run, Phadkar and Hazare added 105 for the sixth wicket.

Phadkar played in 13 unofficial Tests. He played all the ten Tests against the touring Commonwealth teams in 1949/50 and 1950/51. In the former series where India used four captains, Phadkar led the team in the final Test.

He made his first class debut at the age of 17 and went on to captain Bombay in 1950/51. Against Maharashtra in 1948/49 – a match in which 2376 runs were scored – he hit 131 and 160, and took 3/142 and 3/168. His highest first class score was 217 scored against Maharashtra in 1950/51 out of a Bombay total of 725 for 8. He played in the Lancashire League for Nelson, and for Rochdale in the Central Lancashire League.

He was a national selector in the 1970s. MCC made him a life member in 1968. He worked for Tata & Sons in Bombay and also for the Railways. Suhas Phadkar, Dattu's brother's son, later played cricket for Vidarbha and captained the team in the 1980s.

After retirement he founded (1963) and ran a renowned kindergarten school with his wife Soudamini Phadkar in Behala, Calcutta, called Sunny Preparatory School. His death was due to a brain illness.

Preceded by Jack Pettiford	Nelson Cricket Club; Professional; 1951, 1953–1954	Succeeded by Ray Lindwall
