= Jenni Irani =

Indian cricketer

Personal information
- Full name: Jamshed Khudadad Irani
- Born: 18 August 1923; Karachi, Bombay Presidency, British India
- Died: 25 February 1982 (aged 58); Karachi, Sindh, Pakistan
- Batting: Right-handed
- Role: Wicket-keeper

International information
- National side: India
- Test debut (cap 37): 28 November 1947 v Australia
- Last Test: 12 December 1947 v Australia

Career statistics
Competition	Test	First-class
Matches	2	22
Runs scored	3	430
Batting average	3.00	17.20
100s/50s	0/0	0/0
Top score	2*	46
Catches/stumpings	2/1	23/6
- Source: CricketArchive, 3 September 2022

Jamshed Khudadad "Jenni" Irani (18 August 1923 – 25 February 1982) was a cricketer who represented India as a wicket-keeper in Test cricket.

== Life ==
Irani was born in Karachi (present-day Pakistan), then in the Sind province of British India, and made his debut in first-class cricket in 1937 at the age of 14, playing for Sind while still in school. He played his only two Test matches against Australia in 1947/48. In the match against an Australian XI at Sydney, he scored 43 batting at No.11 and added 97 runs with Gogumal Kishenchand. However, he was the first Indian wicket-keeper to score a duck on debut (the only one until Ajay Ratra in 2002) and was replaced after two matches by Khokhan Sen. Sen remained India's wicket-keeper for 5 years, and Irani never played for India again.

He studied in Bai Vibhaji Sopratiwala High School, and DJ Sind College in Karachi, and also played for Bombay University. He worked for Habib Bank. He died in his home town, Karachi, by then in Pakistan.
