= Malcolm Walker (cricketer) =

English cricketer

Personal information
- Born: 14 October 1933; Mexborough, Yorkshire, England
- Died: 2 September 1986 (aged 52); Retford, Nottinghamshire, England
- Batting: Right-handed
- Bowling: Right-arm off-break
- Role: All-rounder

Domestic team information
- Years: Team
- 1952–1958: Somerset
- FC debut: 28 May 1952 Somerset v Indians
- Last FC: 23 May 1958 Somerset v Yorkshire

Career statistics
Competition	First-class
Matches	29
Runs scored	574
Batting average	11.71
100s/50s	1/1
Top score	100
Balls bowled	1,542
Wickets	28
Bowling average	34.85
5 wickets in innings	2
10 wickets in match	0
Best bowling	5/45
Catches/stumpings	8/–
- Source: CricketArchive, 2 June 2008

Malcolm Walker (14 October 1933 – 2 September 1986) was a cricketer who played for Somerset in first-class matches between 1952 and 1958.

== Biography ==
Born at Mexborough, Yorkshire, Walker was a right-handed batsman and a right-arm off-spin bowler. He played five matches as a 16-year-old for Yorkshire's second eleven in 1950, and one the following year, but then joined Somerset where he made his first-class debut in the match against the 1952 Indian side. Three wickets in the match earned him a contract, and in 1953 he started the season as a regular member of what was a very weak side. But in nine matches he scored just 74 runs and took only nine wickets, and was upstaged that summer by an even younger off-spin bowler, Brian Langford, who took 51 County Championship wickets, including 26 in his first three matches.

Walker did not play at all in Somerset's first team in 1954, but he reappeared in mid 1955 in the match against Essex at Romford and, having batted at No 6 in the first innings, was promoted to open the second innings. He made exactly 100, putting on 152 with Peter Wight for the fourth wicket and more than doubling his previous first-class aggregate. Wisden reported that he "drove splendidly, hitting fifteen 4's". After the match, Walker was found to be suffering appendicitis. That limited his further appearances, but he failed to reach 50 in any other innings that season, though his off-spin produced a return of five for 45 against Gloucestershire at Bristol, and that, like his century, remained the best of his career. In its review of Somerset's season, Wisden said the innings at Romford "raised hopes of [Walker] developing into an attractive opening batsman".

The hopes were not realised. In 1956, Walker's fellow Yorkshireman Lewis Pickles became a regular opening batsman, and though the combination of Pickles and Walker, according to Wisden, "promised at one stage to develop into a sound opening pair", Walker lost form after scoring 72 in the match against Derbyshire at Yeovil and was unable to regain his place.

Though Walker played fairly regularly for Somerset's second eleven in both 1957 and 1958, he made only one further first-class appearance, scoring 4 and 0 against Yorkshire at Bath in 1958, a game that was also the last first-class appearance for Pickles, his opening partner.

Walker died in a motorcycle accident at Retford on 2 September 1986.
