= Morgan Herbert =

Australian cricketer

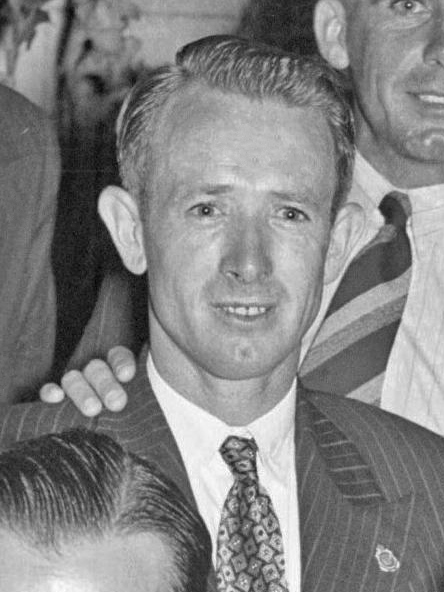
- Herbert in 1948

Personal information
- Full name: Morgan Uriah Herbert
- Born: 4 August 1918; Albany, Western Australia
- Died: 15 June 2000 (aged 81); Perth, Western Australia
- Batting: Right-handed
- Bowling: Legbreak googly

Domestic team information
- Years: Team
- 1945/46–1954/55: Western Australia

Career statistics
Competition	First-class
Matches	18
Runs scored	398
Batting average	14.21
100s/50s	0/1
Top score	53
Balls bowled	1,710
Wickets	40
Bowling average	42.75
5 wickets in innings	2
10 wickets in match	0
Best bowling	7/45
Catches/stumpings	9/–
- Source: Cricinfo, 19 October 2017

Morgan Uriah Herbert (4 August 1918 – 15 June 2000) was an Australian cricketer. He played eighteen first-class matches for Western Australia between 1945–46 and 1954–55. In October 1947, he took his best bowling figures of 7 wickets for 45 runs, against the touring Indian team, in the only innings the Indians got to bat in.
