= Cyril Smith (cricketer) =

Australian cricketer

Personal information
- Full name: Cyril Robert Smith
- Born: 1 November 1926; South Brisbane, Queensland, Australia
- Died: 1 January 2009 (aged 82); Sale, Victoria, Australia
- Batting: Right-handed
- Bowling: Right-arm fast-medium
- Role: Bowler

Domestic team information
- Years: Team
- 1947/48–1953/54: Queensland

Career statistics
Competition	First-class
Matches	27
Runs scored	186
Batting average	6.64
100s/50s	0/0
Top score	27
Balls bowled	5,285
Wickets	71
Bowling average	33.91
5 wickets in innings	3
10 wickets in match	0
Best bowling	7/58
Catches/stumpings	17/–
- Source: CricketArchive, 5 November 2022

Cyril Robert Smith (1 November 1926 – 1 January 2009) was an Australian first-class cricketer who played Sheffield Shield cricket for Queensland. He also represented his state in Australian rules football.

== Biography ==
Smith, who played his football as a ruckman, had an imposing figure, standing two metres tall and weighing 100 kg. On the cricket field he was a fast-medium paceman, who opening the bowling, usually with Len Johnson. He played regularly in the Queensland Australian National Football League for Yeronga and in 1950 was picked in the state squad to go to the Brisbane Carnival, only to withdraw with an injury.

The Queenslander made his first-class cricket debut in the 1946/47 season, against the touring Indian team, but failed to pick up a wicket. He went for 75 runs in the first innings and then 42 from just five overs in the second. Another opportunity came two years later and from then until 1953/54 he missed few matches for Queensland.

In the 1951/52 Sheffield Shield season, Smith took 20 wickets at 28.65, the best return of his career. He had also taken his innings figures, 7-58, in a match against Victoria at the SCG. It was the first time in Sheffield Shield history that a Queensland bowler had taken Victorian wickets in one innings. The Victorians continued to see the best of Smith throughout his career, with his final tally showing 32 wickets at 23.34. He played another international side that season, with the West Indies in the country for a Test series. Although he only took two wickets, both of them were an opening batsman, Jeff Stollmeyer. Another Test batsman who Smith had success with over the course of his career was Sam Loxton, whom he dismissed five times in first-class cricket.

He was invited by Footscray president, Con Weichart, to train with the Victorian Football League club in April 1952. Weichart had spotted Smith at the MCG, when he was playing a Shield match against Victoria, and was impressed by his agility. He trained with coach Charlie Sutton for two weeks but in the end decided to stay in Queensland. Footscray instead debuted ruckman Brian Gilmore in 1952, who would play in the club's first ever premiership in 1954.

After returns of 19 wickets at 31.57 and 16 wickets in 35.37, over the next two Shield season, Smith wasn't picked again for Queensland. The selectors had needed to drop a bowler, in order to fit former New South Wales bowling all-rounder Ray Lindwall in the team, and Smith was the one to make way.
