= Ranabir Sen =

Indian cricketer (1945–2025)

Personal information
- Born: 18 October 1945; Calcutta, India
- Died: 30 April 2025 (aged 79)
- Batting: Left-handed
- Relatives: Probir Sen (brother)

Domestic team information
- Years: Team
- 1962/63, 1971/72: Bengal
- Source: Cricinfo, 2 April 2016

Ranabir Sen (18 October 1945 – 30 April 2025) was an Indian cricketer. He played two first-class matches for Bengal between 1962 and 1972.

== See also ==
- List of Bengal cricketers
