= C. R. Rangachari =

Personal information
- Full name: Commandur Rajagopalachari Rangachari
- Born: 14 April 1916; Mamandur, Madras Presidency, British India
- Died: 9 October 1993 (aged 77); Chennai, Tamil Nadu, India
- Batting: Right-handed
- Bowling: Right-arm fast

International information
- National side: India
- Test debut (cap 44): 23 January 1948 v Australia
- Last Test: 9 December 1948 v West Indies

Career statistics
| Competition | Test | First-class |
|---|---|---|
| Matches | 4 | 62 |
| Runs scored | 8 | 480 |
| Batting average | 2.66 | 7.74 |
| 100s/50s | 0/0 | 0/1 |
| Top score | 8* | 60 |
| Balls bowled | 846 | 10,908 |
| Wickets | 9 | 199 |
| Bowling average | 54.77 | 26.11 |
| 5 wickets in innings | 1 | 14 |
| 10 wickets in match | 0 | 0 |
| Best bowling | 5/107 | 7/34 |
| Catches/stumpings | 1/– | 42/– |
- Source: CricketArchive, 9 June 2022

Commandur Rajagopalachari Rangachari (14 April 1916 – 9 October 1993) was a fast bowler who represented India in Test cricket.

Rangachari was a medium pace bowler who bowled with a slight round-arm action and moved the ball away from the batsman. He was a student of the Pachaiyappa's College in Madras. When the Madras cricket league was started in 1932, he played for Chepauk United Club and then switched to Triplicane CC. Here he formed a fearsome partnership with M.J. Gopalan.

Rangachari first claimed the spotlight when he took 9 for 45 against Mysore in an inter-association junior match in 1938. The same year he was selected in the Ranji Trophy team. Ranga was also a fine fielder, and fielding usually at silly mid-off, formed a nice combination with the spinner A.G. Ram Singh.

He was selected for the tour of Australia in 1947/48. He took a hat-trick in the match against Tasmania. On his Test debut at Adelaide he took 4 for 141, dismissing Neil Harvey, Keith Miller, Ray Lindwall and Ian Johnson. His career best Test bowling was 5 for 107 against West Indies at Delhi. Coming on as the first change bowler, he dismissed Allan Rae, Jeff Stollmeyer and George Headley in his first 19 balls, conceding one run. Headley's leg stump was sent flying several yards and splintered from top to bottom. In his first five innings in Tests, his scores were 0*, 0, 0, 0,* and 0.

He played unofficial Tests against the Australian Services Team in 1945/46 and against the first Commonwealth team in 1949/50, and two M. J. Gopalan Trophy matches. He captained Madras in two matches in 1952/53. He managed several Tamil Nadu/Madras and South Zone teams and was a state selector. He took 104 wickets for Madras in the Ranji Trophy.

His son C. R. Vijayaraghavan has umpired in One Day Internationals and first class cricket and as a third umpire in Test matches.

Rangachari worked in the police department and retired as the Deputy Superintendent. He died from a cardiac failure.
