= George Borwick (umpire) =

Australian cricket umpire (1896–1981)

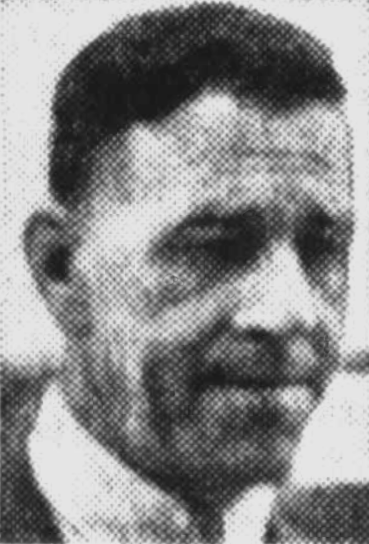
George Borwick.

George Eric Borwick MBE (2 April 1896 at Pyrmont, New South Wales – 1 August 1981 at Hornsby, New South Wales) was a cricket Test match umpire.

He umpired twenty-four Test matches, between 1931 and 1948. He made his debut in the second Test match played between Australia and the West Indies, played at Sydney on 1 January to 5 January 1931. In this match Borwick was partnered by another debutant umpire, Walter French.

Borwick's last match was played between Australia and India, played at Adelaide on 23 January to 28 January 1948. In this match, in spite of a century in each innings by Vijay Hazare, Australia won by an innings with Bradman scoring a double century. Borwick's partner in this match was Ron Wright, standing in his first match.

Moyes remarked that Borwick had the confidence of all Australian players and "ranks among the best we have seen". Standing in all the "Bodyline" Tests with George Hele, Borwick was later critical of the tactics used by England's captain, Douglas Jardine.

He was appointed Member of the Order of the British Empire (MBE) in the 1971 Birthday Honours for services to sport.

== See also ==
- Australian Test cricket umpires
- List of Test umpires
