= John Childe-Freeman =

Australian cricketer (born 1935)

Personal information
- Full name: John Edward Childe-Freeman
- Born: 28 June 1935 (age 91); Brisbane, Queensland
- Batting: Right-handed
- Bowling: Right-arm leg-spin

Domestic team information
- Years: Team
- 1955-56 to 1961-62: Queensland

Career statistics
Competition	First-class
Matches	28
Runs scored	265
Batting average	16.56
100s/50s	0/1
Top score	55 not out
Balls bowled	4520
Wickets	52
Bowling average	44.21
5 wickets in innings	2
10 wickets in match	0
Best bowling	6/134
Catches/stumpings	5/0
- Source: Cricinfo, 30 September 2017

John Edward Childe-Freeman, usually known during his playing career as John Freeman (born 28 June 1935 in Brisbane) is a former cricketer for Queensland who played 28 matches of first-class cricket between 1956 and 1962.

== Early life ==
Freeman was born in Brisbane, Queensland, Australia on 28 June 1935. He attended Brisbane State High School.

== Career ==
A leg-spin bowler, Childe-Freeman had his best season in the Sheffield Shield in 1956–57, taking 23 wickets at an average of 34.04 and forming a leg-spinning partnership with Wal Walmsley (who took 28 wickets at 28.39) that helped Queensland achieve second place at the end of the season. He took his best figures of 6 for 134 in the second match of the season, against Western Australia, after taking 5 for 77 against New South Wales in the first match.
