= Walter Driver =

Australian cricketer (1922–1994)

Wally Driver
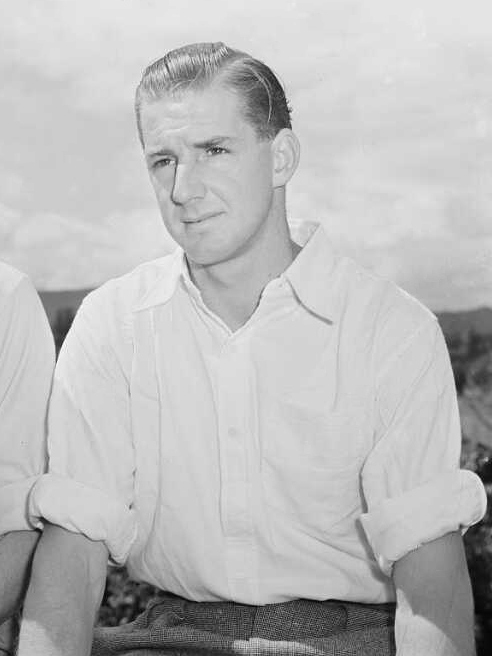
- Driver in 1950

Personal information
- Full name: Walter George Driver
- Born: 25 September 1922; Melbourne, Australia
- Died: 11 January 1994 (aged 71); Mooloolaba, Queensland, Australia
- Batting: Left-handed
- Bowling: Right-arm medium-pace

Domestic team information
- Years: Team
- 1946–47: Victoria
- 1949–50: Western Australia

Career statistics
Competition	First-class
Matches	10
Runs scored	518
Batting average	37.00
100s/50s	1/1
Top score	109
Balls bowled	96
Wickets	2
Bowling average	33.00
5 wickets in innings	0
10 wickets in match	0
Best bowling	2/17
Catches/stumpings	2/0
- Source: Cricinfo, 27 June 2016

Walter George "Wally" Driver (25 September 1922 – 11 January 1994) was an Australian cricketer. He played two first-class cricket matches for Victoria in 1946–47 and four matches for Western Australia in the 1949–50 season. Driver toured New Zealand with the Australian team in February and March 1950, but in May 1950 he returned to Melbourne because he believed the prospects of finding suitable employment were brighter in Melbourne than Perth. He did not play first-class cricket again.

== See also ==
- List of Victoria first-class cricketers
- List of Western Australia first-class cricketers
