= Rangachari Vijayaraghavan =

Indian cricket umpire (born 1946)

Personal information
- Born: 2 September 1946 (age 80); Bangalore, India

Umpiring information
- ODIs umpired: 2 (1990–2000)
- Source: Cricinfo, 31 May 2014

Rangachari Vijayaraghavan (born 2 September 1946) is a former Indian cricket umpire. He stood in two ODI games between 1990 and 2010. He is the son of the former Indian fast bowler C. R. Rangachari.

== See also ==
- List of One Day International cricket umpires
