= Miles Lawrence =

English cricketer

Personal information
- Full name: John Miles Lawrence
- Born: 7 November 1940; Rothwell, Leeds, Yorkshire, England
- Died: 16 April 1989 (aged 48); Toulston, Tadcaster, Yorkshire, England
- Batting: Right-handed
- Bowling: Leg-break

Domestic team information
- Years: Team
- 1959–1961: Somerset

Career statistics
Competition	FC
Matches	18
Runs scored	372
Batting average	15.50
100s/50s	0/0
Top score	41
Balls bowled	612
Wickets	9
Bowling average	40.33
5 wickets in innings	0
10 wickets in match	0
Best bowling	3/44
Catches/stumpings	7/–
- Source: CricketArchive, 22 December 2015

John Miles Lawrence (born 7 November 1940 at Rothwell, West Yorkshire; died 16 April 1989 at Toulston, Tadcaster, Yorkshire) played first-class cricket for Somerset in 18 matches between 1959 and 1961.

The son of former Somerset all-rounder Johnny Lawrence, and like him a right-handed middle-order batsman and a leg-spin bowler, Miles Lawrence made 33 in his debut innings as an 18-year-old for Somerset late in the 1959 season. In the next match, he performed even better: he took 45 minutes to score his first run but then made 35 and shared a 118-run sixth-wicket partnership with his captain, Maurice Tremlett, before finishing off a victory for Somerset with three of the last four Nottinghamshire wickets. Those bowling figures of three for 44 were to remain his best, however.

In 1960, he played five games without bettering his personal batting or bowling bests. The following year, he was given an extended run on the Somerset side, playing in 10 of the first 12 first-class matches. He was used almost entirely as a batsman, bowling just seven overs and failing to take a wicket. In 18 innings, two of them not out, he made only 199 runs at an average of 12.43. This included his highest score of 41, made against Middlesex at Taunton. He left Somerset at the end of the season, and did not play first-class cricket again.

Miles Lawrence returned to Yorkshire where he was associated with his father's indoor cricket schools business and coached at Leeds Grammar School. In Yorkshire league cricket, he became a wicketkeeper. He died just four months after his father, aged 48.
