= Noel McMahon =

New Zealand cricketer and charity worker

Noel McMahon QSM
- McMahon in 1950

Personal information
- Full name: Noel Albert McMahon
- Born: 24 May 1916; Auckland, New Zealand
- Died: 9 June 2013 (aged 97); Auckland, New zealand
- Batting: Right-handed
- Bowling: Right-arm leg-spin

Domestic team information
- Years: Team
- 1936/37–1937/38: Auckland

Career statistics
Competition	First-class
Matches	3
Runs scored	13
Batting average	3.25
100s/50s	0/0
Top score	12
Balls bowled	156
Wickets	3
Bowling average	32.00
5 wickets in innings	0
10 wickets in match	0
Best bowling	2/42
Catches/stumpings	1/–
- Source: Cricinfo, 4 January 2015

Noel Albert McMahon QSM (24 May 1916 – 9 June 2013) was a cricketer who played one match for New Zealand in the 1949–50 season.

== Early life and cricket career ==
McMahon was born in Auckland and grew up in Te Awamutu. He played two matches for Auckland in the Plunket Shield in 1936–37 and 1937–38 as a leg-spinner without distinguishing himself, although he dismissed the Test batsmen Curly Page and Ian Cromb in his first match. He was described at the time as spinning the ball sharply but with erratic length.

After serving overseas in the New Zealand Third Division in World War II, McMahon settled in Te Awamutu, where he ran a drapery store from 1944 to 1964. He played most of his senior cricket for Waikato in the Hawke Cup as a middle-order batsman. In 1948–49 he scored 138 in an innings victory over Bay of Plenty.

McMahon began the 1949–50 season by scoring 111 in a drawn match against Hutt Valley, reaching his century in 50 minutes and hitting 12 fours and eight sixes. In Waikato's next match, a two-day fixture against the touring Australians, he scored 102 in 157 minutes (12 fours and three sixes) out of a team total of 157; the next best score was 15. Given that he was 33 years old and had not played a first-class match for 12 years, his selection for the only match between New Zealand and the Australians three weeks later was unexpected. Even the Australians were surprised, as they had not taken the Waikato match very seriously. He made 0 and 12, bowled by Jack Iverson each time, and New Zealand narrowly avoided an innings defeat. He played a few more Hawke Cup matches for Waikato in 1950–51 and 1951–52.

== Later life ==
From 1966 to 1990 McMahon organised an annual cricketers' golf day in aid of charity at the North Shore Golf Club in Auckland. He was awarded the Queen's Service Medal for community service in the 1995 Queen's Birthday Honours.

Since 1967–68 the Noel McMahon Cup has been awarded annually for the fastest century in Hamilton Cricket Association matches.
