= Wal Walmsley =

Australian cricketer (1916–1978)

Personal information
- Full name: Walter Thomas Walmsley
- Born: 16 March 1916; Homebush, New South Wales
- Died: 25 February 1978 (aged 61); Hamilton, New Zealand
- Batting: Right-handed
- Bowling: Right-arm leg-break

Domestic team information
- Years: Team
- 1945/46: New South Wales
- 1947/48: Tasmania
- 1954/55–1958/59: Queensland
- 1959/60: Northern Districts

Career statistics
Competition	First-class
Matches	37
Runs scored	1,064
Batting average	27.28
100s/50s	2/4
Top score	180*
Balls bowled	7,916
Wickets	122
Bowling average	31.64
5 wickets in innings	3
10 wickets in match	0
Best bowling	6/56
Catches/stumpings	8/–
- Source: CricketArchive, 25 September 2013

Walter Thomas Walmsley (16 March 1916 – 25 February 1978) was a cricketer who played first-class cricket for three Australian state teams and for Northern Districts in New Zealand between 1945–46 and 1959–60.

The Tasmanian team that played the Indians at Hobart in January 1948. Wal Walmsley is seated third from the right.

A batsman who could bat at any position in the order and a leg-break and googly bowler, Wal Walmsley made his first-class debut for New South Wales against Queensland in a friendly match in 1945–46. He moved to Launceston, Tasmania, to coach, where he captained North (of Tasmania) against South in January 1948, taking 10 wickets in the match and scoring 63 in the second innings. He played in Tasmania's three first-class games that followed shortly afterwards, scoring 180 not out and taking three wickets against the Indian touring team at Launceston.

Walmsley was appointed coach of the Queensland Cricket Association in 1948–49, but did not play for Queensland until the 1954–55 season, after which he became a regular in the side. In his first Sheffield Shield match, at the age of 38, he took 5 for 84 and 3 for 90 to help Queensland to victory over South Australia.

In 1956–57 Walmsley took 3 for 52 and 5 for 124 against New South Wales. His batting by this stage was generally less effective than his bowling (in 28 matches for Queensland he scored 577 runs at 21.37 and took 102 wickets at 30.12) but he scored 106 not out batting at number 10 against New South Wales in 1957–58, sharing a ninth-wicket partnership of 120 with Ray Reynolds and an unbroken tenth-wicket partnership of 105 with John Freeman. He also took six wickets in the match.

In 1958–59 he took 6 for 56 to help Queensland to an innings victory over South Australia. Before the season ended, he moved to New Zealand to take up a position teaching at the Church of Jesus Christ of Latter-day Saints college in Hamilton, playing his first first-class match in New Zealand, for a combined Northern Districts and Central Districts team against the touring MCC, almost immediately.

Walmsley played three matches for Northern Districts in 1959–60 at the age of 43, taking 12 wickets at 26.58, then retired. He remained in New Zealand with his large family, and died suddenly in Hamilton at 61.
