= Ghulam Ahmed (cricketer) =

Indian cricketer

- Ghulam Ahmed

Personal information
- Born: 4 July 1922; Hyderabad, Hyderabad State, British India
- Died: 28 October 1998 (aged 76); Hyderabad, Andhra Pradesh, India
- Batting: Right-handed
- Bowling: Right-arm offbreak

International information
- National side: India
- Test debut (cap 49): 31 December 1948 v West Indies
- Last Test: 31 December 1958 v West Indies

Career statistics
Competition	Test	First-class
Matches	22	98
Runs scored	192	1,379
Batting average	8.72	14.36
100s/50s	0/1	0/5
Top score	50	90
Balls bowled	5,650	24,263
Wickets	68	407
Bowling average	30.17	22.57
5 wickets in innings	4	32
10 wickets in match	1	9
Best bowling	7/49	9/53
Catches/stumpings	11/–	57/–
- Source: ESPNcricinfo, 23 November 2020

Ghulam Ahmed (4 July 1922 – 28 October 1998) was an off spin bowler who captained India in Test cricket. After his retirement, he served for many years as the secretary of BCCI.

== Early life ==
He was educated at the Madrassa-e-Aliya, a school established in 1872 during the reign of the Nizams for the elite and served the city's nobility.

== Cricket career ==
He played first-class cricket for Hyderabad from 1939–40 to 1958–59, and 22 Tests for India from 1948–49 to 1958–59. He toured England in 1952 and Pakistan in 1954–55. He captained India in one Test against New Zealand in 1955–56, which was drawn, and two Tests against West Indies in 1958–59, both of which India lost.

The finest Off-Spinner of Indian National Cricket

He was the leading bowler on the 1952 tour, taking 80 wickets in first-class matches at 21.92, and 15 in the four Tests at 24.73. Wisden said he "had days when he looked in the highest world class, but on other occasions he lacked bite". In the first innings of the First Test he bowled 63 overs and took 5 for 100. In the match against Oxford University he took 8 for 84 and 5 for 66.

In the First Test against Pakistan in 1952–53, the inaugural Test between the two neighbours, he took five wickets, and made 50 at number 11, putting on 109 for the tenth wicket with Hemu Adhikari.

In the Third Test against Australia in Calcutta in 1956-57 he took 7 for 49 and 3 for 81, his best Test innings and match figures.

His best match and innings first-class figures came in the match against Madras in the Ranji Trophy in 1947–48, when he took 5 for 28 and 9 for 53. When Holkar made 757 against Hyderabad in 1950-51 he had bowling figures of 92.3-21-245-4.

He managed the Indian team that toured Australia and New Zealand in 1967–68.

== Later years ==
Ahmed was one of the founders of the Sultan-ul-Uloom Education Society.

== Personal life and family ==
Marriage of Ghulam Ahmed and Saleema Mohiuddin in 1952, Hyderabad, India.

Ghulam Ahmed married Saleema Mohiuddin, daughter of Ghouse Mohiuddin, a civil servant of the Indian Government who served as the Collector of Hyderabad. Ghulam and his wife are survived by their two daughters and son; Nariman Hyder, Nuzhan Mirza and Nisar Ahmed; his six grand children, Mariam Hyder, Yasser Mirza, Faiza Hyder, Amaan Hyder, Shaan Hyder and Rayyan Ahmed; and his two great-grand children, Samara Mirza and Aadam Mirza.

He was the uncle of the former Pakistan captain Asif Iqbal, and the great-uncle of Indian tennis player Sania Mirza.

Preceded by Vinoo Mankad	Indian National Test Cricket Captain; 1955/6 (1 Test Match)	Succeeded by Polly Umrigar
Preceded by Polly Umrigar	Indian National Test Cricket Captain; 1958/9	Succeeded by Vinoo Mankad
