= Gul Mohammad =

Pakistani cricketer

Personal information
- Born: 15 October 1921; Lahore, Punjab, British India
- Died: 8 May 1992 (aged 70); Lahore, Punjab, Pakistan
- Height: 5 ft 5 in (1.65 m)
- Batting: Left-handed
- Bowling: Left-arm medium

International information
- National sides: India (1946–1952); Pakistan (1956)
- Test debut (cap 27/24): 22 June 1946; India v England
- Last Test: 11 October 1956; Pakistan v Australia

Career statistics
Competition	Test	First-class
Matches	9	118
Runs scored	205	5,614
Batting average	12.81	33.81
100s/50s	0/0	12/21
Top score	34	319
Balls bowled	77	7,295
Wickets	2	107
Bowling average	12.00	27.20
5 wickets in innings	0	3
10 wickets in match	0	0
Best bowling	2/21	6/60
Catches/stumpings	3	60
- Source: ESPNcricinfo, 13 June 2016

Gul Mohammad, sometimes referred to as Gul Mahomed, (15 October 1921 – 8 May 1992) played Test cricket for India and Pakistan. He was educated at Islamia College, Lahore.

Gul Mohammad was a small man who stood only 5' 5, but a brilliant attacking left-handed batsman and fine fielder in the covers. He made his first-class debut at the age of 17 and hit 95 in his first match in the Bombay Pentangular. In 1942/43, he scored 144 for Bijapur Famine XI against Bengal Cyclone XI and added 302 with Vijay Hazare. On a slow, flat wicket, the first innings of the two teams added up to 1376 runs.

Gul Mohammad's most famous innings is the 319 that he scored for Baroda against Holkar in the final of the 1946/47 Ranji Trophy. Gul joined Vijay Hazare with the score at 91 for 3 and when he was out 533 minutes later, they had added 577 runs, then a world record for any wicket in first-class cricket. Hazare scored 288 in ten and a half hours. During the course of the innings, they bettered the Indian record of 410 between Lala Amarnath and Rusi Modi and the world record of 574* by Frank Worrell and Clyde Walcott.

Gul Mohammad toured England in 1946 and Australia in 1947/48 and played Test matches without much success. His highest score was 34 in the second innings at Adelaide while Hazare was scoring his second hundred of the match at the other end. In 1952/53, he played for India in two Tests of Pakistan's first series. For a time, he was a professional with Ramsbottom in the Lancashire League.

He continued to play in Ranji Trophy until he decided to take Pakistan citizenship in 1955. He played one Test for Pakistan, against Australia in 1956/57 where he scored 12 and 27 not out and hit the winning runs.

He later turned to cricket administration. He was in director board of the Gaddafi Stadium in Lahore till 1987 and then a cricket coach in the Punjab Sports Board. Gul Mohammad died of liver cancer.

== See also ==
- List of cricketers who have played for two international teams
