= Lance Duldig =

Australian cricketer

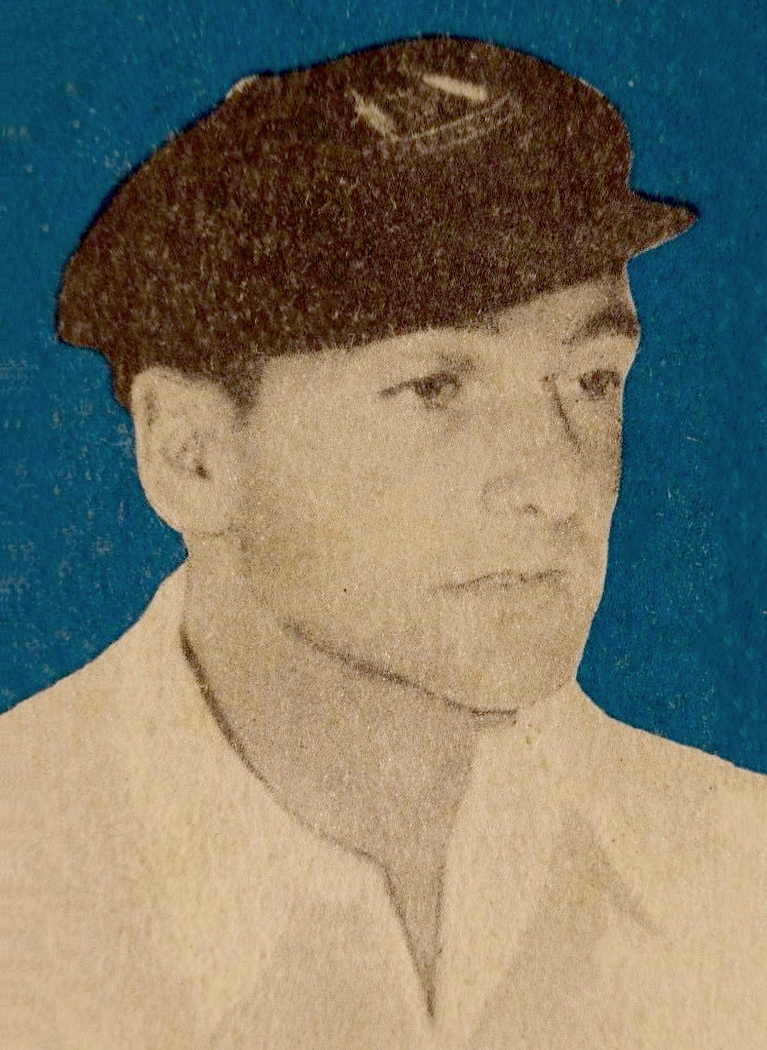
- Duldig on a 1951 card

Personal information
- Full name: Lance Desmond Duldig
- Born: 21 February 1922; Eudunda, South Australia
- Died: 14 September 1998 (aged 76); Beaumont, South Australia
- Batting: Right-handed

Domestic team information
- Years: Team
- 1940–41 to 1952–53: South Australia

Career statistics
Competition	First-class
Matches	40
Runs scored	2107
Batting average	31.44
100s/50s	1/12
Top score	121 not out
Balls bowled	8
Wickets	0
Bowling average	–
5 wickets in innings	–
10 wickets in match	–
Best bowling	–
Catches/stumpings	16/0
- Source: Cricinfo, 22 June 2016

Lance Desmond Duldig (21 February 1922 – 14 September 1998) was an Australian first-class cricketer who played for South Australia from 1941 to 1953. He toured New Zealand with the Australian team in 1949–50.

== Cricket career ==
A right-handed middle-order batsman, Lance Duldig captained the South Australian schoolboys team in 1937. He made his first-class debut for South Australia on his nineteenth birthday in 1941. He enlisted later that year and served with the 2/3 Machine Gun Battalion in New Guinea. His recovery after the war was hampered by malaria, and his second first-class match did not come until 1948–49, when he began five seasons as a regular member of the South Australian team.

He scored consistently, making nearly 2000 runs in the five seasons, but with only one century, 121 not out against Victoria in 1949–50. He was selected in the Australian team that toured New Zealand in 1949–50 under Bill Brown, but made only 80 runs in four first-class matches in the damp conditions.

His attractive unbeaten 70 against MCC in 1950–51 was described punningly in one British paper as "far from a dull dig". The next season, he top-scored in South Australia's second innings against the West Indians, making 66 out of a total of 155 on a turning pitch. South Australia won the Sheffield Shield in his last season, 1952–53, but he lost form and missed the last match in which South Australia clinched the title.
