= Kanwar Rai Singh =

Indian cricketer (1922–1993)

Personal information
- Born: 24 February 1922; Darkati, Punjab Province, British India (now in Himachal Pradesh)
- Died: 12 November 1993 (aged 71); Dehra Dun, Uttar Pradesh, India (now in Uttarakhand)
- Batting: Right-handed

International information
- National side: India
- Only Test (cap 42): 1 January 1948 v Australia

Career statistics
Competition	Test	First-class
Matches	1	38
Runs scored	26	1,778
Batting average	13.00	30.13
100s/50s	0/0	4/7
Top score	24	158
Balls bowled	–	1,448
Wickets	–	21
Bowling average	–	33.33
5 wickets in innings	–	0
10 wickets in match	–	0
Best bowling	–	4/31
Catches/stumpings	0/–	12/–
- Source: ESPNcricinfo, 11 January 2013

Kanwar Rai Singh (24 February 1922 – 12 November 1993) was an Indian cricketer who played in one Test match in 1948. A right-handed batsman, Rai Singh was a surprise selection for the Indian tour of Australia in 1947–48. During his career, which spanned from 1940 until 1961, Rai Singh scored 1,778 runs in first-class cricket at an average of 30.13, scoring four centuries and seven half-centuries.

== See also ==
- One Test Wonder
