= Lewis Pickles =

English cricketer (1932–2021)

Personal information
- Full name: Lewis Pickles
- Born: 17 September 1932; Wakefield, Yorkshire, England
- Died: 11 June 2021 (aged 88)
- Batting: Right-handed
- Bowling: Right-arm off-break
- Role: Opening batsman

Domestic team information
- Years: Team
- 1955–1958: Somerset
- First-class debut: 14 May 1955 Somerset v Surrey
- Last First-class: 23 May 1958 Somerset v Yorkshire

Career statistics
Competition	First-class
Matches	47
Runs scored	1702
Batting average	20.50
100s/50s	0/8
Top score	87
Balls bowled	66
Wickets	1
Bowling average	65.00
5 wickets in innings	0
10 wickets in match	0
Best bowling	1/22
Catches/stumpings	21/0
- Source: CricketArchive, 31 May 2008

Lewis Pickles (17 September 1932 – 11 June 2021) was an English cricketer who played as an opening batsman for Somerset for just over three seasons in the mid-1950s.

== Career ==
Somerset's recruitment policy for new players after falling to the bottom of the County Championship from 1952 to 1955 ranged far and wide, and Lewis Pickles was one of the recruits. A fair-haired right-handed opening batsman from Wakefield in Yorkshire, who had made appearances for Yorkshire's Second Eleven, he was stationed in Somerset during his national service, and came to the attention of the county club in 1953. He played a couple of games in 1955 and then became the regular opener for the 1956 season. He did well enough to win his county cap, scoring 1,136 runs at an average of 24, and making his highest score of 87 against the bowling of Brian Statham, Roy Tattersall and Malcolm Hilton against Lancashire at Old Trafford. Wisden noted that Pickles and fellow Yorkshireman Malcolm Walker looked at one stage capable of forming a regular opening partnership, but Walker lost form.

The 1957 season proved more difficult for Pickles, with more competition for batting places after the arrival of Bill Alley to join the side. Alley often opened, and Pickles' uncertain form saw him play in less than half the first-class matches.

In 1958, he played just four times and his last first-class match was also the last match played by Walker. Pickles left the county's staff at the end of the season, playing in Scotland for a few years, then returning to Yorkshire where he played League cricket for Pudsey St Lawrence (Leonard Hutton's old club) and from 1970 until 1985 for Lightcliffe Cricket Club in the Bradford League, where his off-spin was a useful adjunct to his status as an opening batsman. Later he worked as an accountant.
