= Hemu Adhikari =

Indian cricketer (1919–2003)

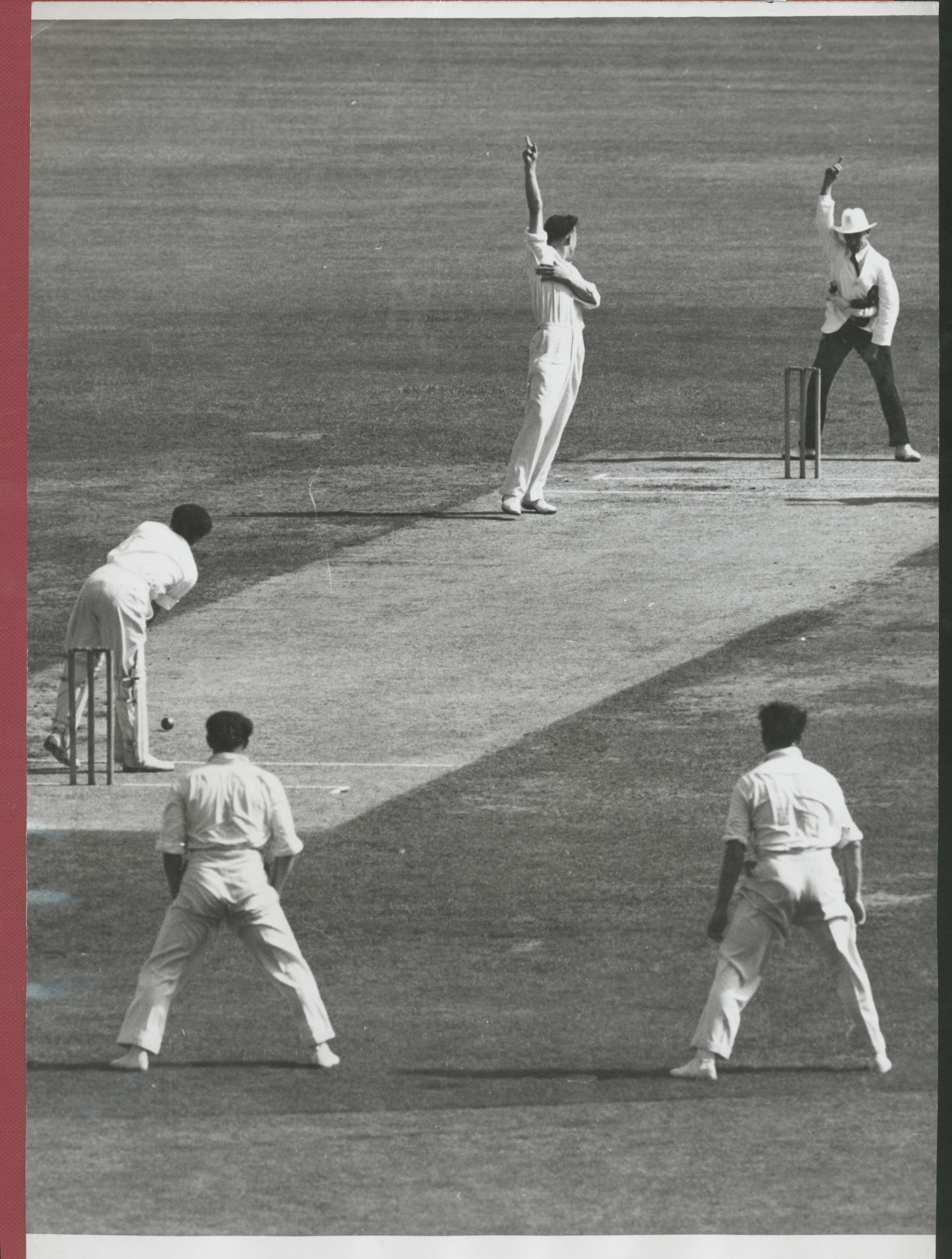

Personal information
- Full name: Hemchandra Ramachandra Adhikari
- Born: 31 July 1919; Pune, Bombay Presidency, British India
- Died: 25 October 2003 (aged 84); Mumbai, Maharashtra, India
- Batting: Right-handed
- Bowling: Right-arm leg spin

International information
- National side: India
- Test debut (cap 36): 28 November 1947 v Australia
- Last Test: 11 February 1959 v West Indies

Career statistics
Competition	Test	First-class
Matches	21	152
Runs scored	872	8,683
Batting average	31.14	41.74
100s/50s	1/4	17/45
Top score	114*	230*
Balls bowled	170	4,000
Wickets	3	49
Bowling average	27.33	37.93
5 wickets in innings	0	0
10 wickets in match	0	0
Best bowling	3/68	3/2
Catches/stumpings	8/–	97/–
- Source: ESPNcricinfo, 15 November 2022

Colonel Hemchandra "Hemu" Ramachandra Adhikari (31 July 1919 – 25 October 2003) was an Indian cricketer, representing his country both as a player and a coach in a career that spanned three decades. He received the C. K. Nayudu Lifetime Achievement Award in 1998, the highest honour bestowed by the BCCI on a former player.

== Life and career ==
A talented right-handed batsman and occasional leg spin bowler, Adhikari made his first-class cricket debut as a teenager before the outbreak of World War II in the 1936/37 domestic season. He immediately demonstrated his abilities on the local stage but due to the war, and his role in the Indian armed forces, his career was interrupted.

Adhikari made his Test debut as a 28-year-old in 1947 on India's tour of Australia and immediately established himself as an important member of the squad, although his continued official role in the army restricted his availability for the team.

He held a national record 109-run last wicket partnership with Ghulam Ahmed in a Test against regional rivals Pakistan. He captained India in one Test as he neared his fortieth birthday, scoring 63 and 40 while batting and taking three wickets in a drawn game against the West Indies.

Adhikari took to coaching after retiring from first-class cricket – with a very good batting average of 41.74 – and was in charge of the Indian team as they established themselves on the world stage. He helped guide India to their first series win in England in 1971 and was a major reason behind the development of such outstanding cricketers as Sunil Gavaskar, Kapil Dev and Ravi Shastri. Some felt his history with military helped him as a coach, with former national team spin bowler Bapu Nadkarni saying "Adhikari was a disciplined man. Being a military man, he would not bother about what anybody else thought." Col Hemu Adhikari was the mentor of another military man & famous cricket coach from Hyderabad Mirza Rehmat Ullah Baig (M.R Baig), who was a Ranji Cricketer from Services and served as an assistant coach under the mentorship of Col Hemu Adhikari.

After his death in October 2003, at age 84, tributes flooded in for the popular Indian, with Indian cricket writer Suresh Menon saying "Adhikari was not a big man yet he was a presence. He will be remembered for his role in Indian cricket's self-confidence movement that began with that series win in 1971."

== Career bests ==
=== Test matches ===
Test Debut: vs Australia, Brisbane, 1947/48
Last Test: vs West Indies, Delhi, 1958/59

- Adhikari's best Test batting score of 114 not out was made against West Indies, Delhi, 1948/49
- His best Test bowling figures of 3 for 68 came against West Indies, Delhi, 1958/59
- His Test captaincy record was: 1 match, 1 draw

=== First-class ===
- Adhikari's best first-class batting score was 230 not out

Preceded by Vinoo Mankad	Indian National Test Cricket Captain; 1958/59 (1 Test Match)	Succeeded by Datta Gaekwad
