= William Morris (Australian cricketer) =

Australian cricketer (born 1918)

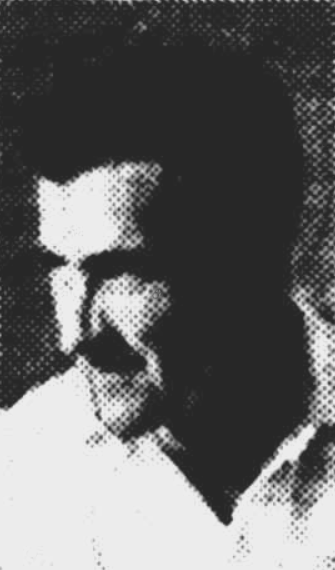

Personal information
- Full name: William Wallace Morris
- Born: 6 March 1918; Thornleigh, New South Wales, Australia
- Source: Cricinfo, 5 October 2020

William Wallace Morris (born 6 March 1918, date of death unknown) was an Australian cricketer. He played in 34 first-class matches for Queensland between 1945 and 1950. Morris is deceased.

== See also ==
- List of Queensland first-class cricketers
