= William Cain (cricketer) =

Australian cricketer

Personal information
- Born: 17 December 1899; Paddington, Queensland, Australia
- Died: 24 December 1981 (aged 82); Sherwood, Queensland, Australia
- Source: Cricinfo, 1 October 2020

William Cain (17 December 1899 – 24 December 1981) was an Australian cricketer. He played in three first-class matches for Queensland in 1924/25.

== See also ==
- List of Queensland first-class cricketers
