= Roy Howard =

Australian cricketer

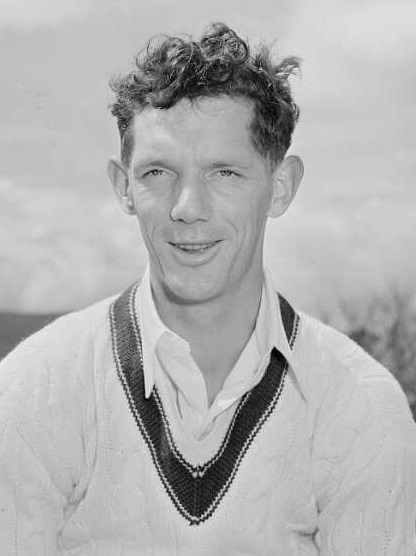
- Howard in New Zealand in 1950

Personal information
- Born: 15 November 1922; Melbourne, Australia
- Died: 6 August 2008 (aged 85); Melbourne, Australia

Domestic team information
- Years: Team
- 1946–1951: Victoria
- Source: Cricinfo, 29 November 2015

Roy Howard (15 November 1922 – 6 August 2008) was an Australian cricketer. He played 29 first-class cricket matches for Victoria between 1946 and 1951.

== Career ==
The career of batsman, Roy Howard, began following World War II, but only after he made a few appearances for Victoria. He made his debut in 1948–49 after scoring a century against the Tasmanians to secure a lengthy stint in the team. He continued to play well in 1949–50, and at the end of the season, he was chosen to travel on the New Zealand trip. Although the trip, which was led by Bill Brown, was not full-strength and did not contain any Test matches, Howard performed admirably and hit a career-high 141 against Otago. Against the traveling MCC, he began 1950–51 with another hundred, but it would be his last season with the state. After retiring as a player, he served as a grade umpire and played baseball for Victoria.

== See also ==
- List of Victoria first-class cricketers
