= George Davies (cricketer) =

Australian cricketer

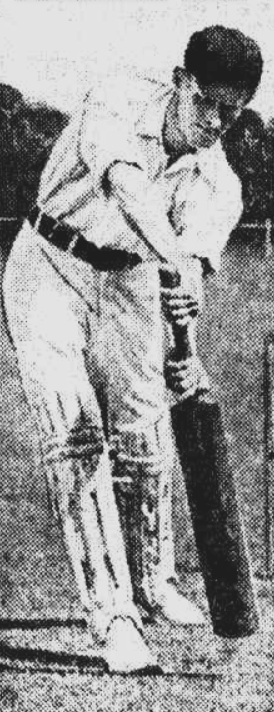

Personal information
- Born: 19 March 1892; Maindample, Victoria, Australia
- Died: 27 November 1957 (aged 65); Essendon, Victoria, Australia

Domestic team information
- Years: Team
- 1921-1932: Victoria
- Source: Cricinfo, 19 November 2015

George Davies (19 March 1892 – 27 November 1957) was an Australian cricketer. He played five first-class cricket matches for Victoria between 1921 and 1932.

== See also ==
- List of Victoria first-class cricketers
