= Probir Sen =

Indian cricketer (1926–1970)

Khokhan Sen
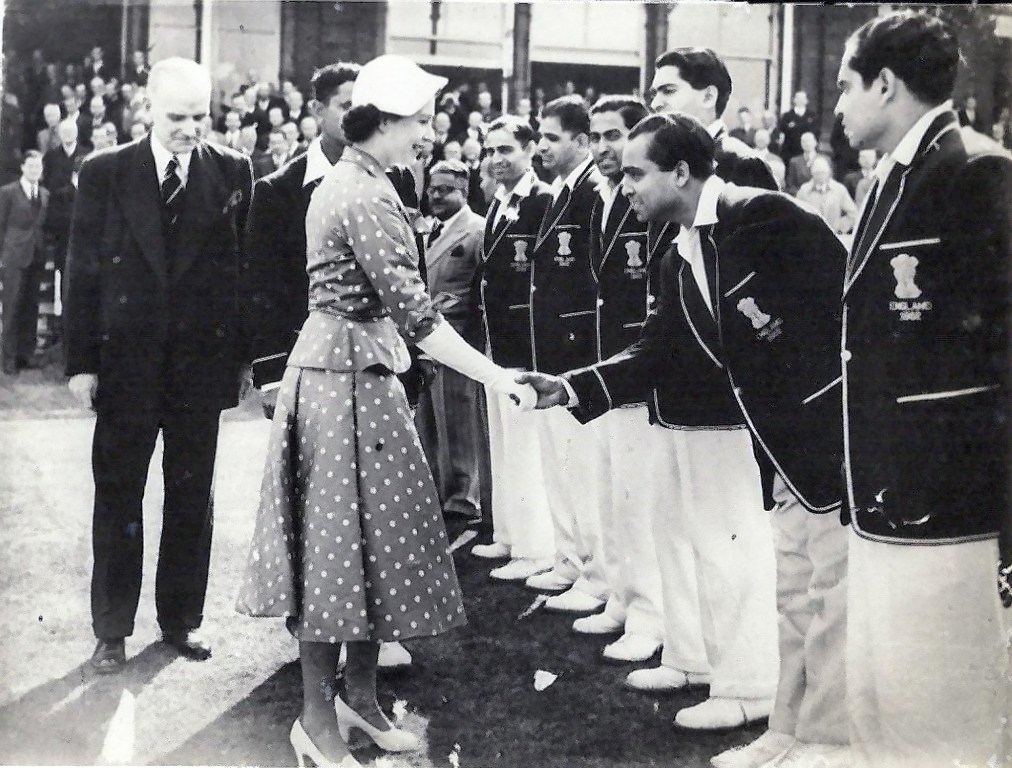
- Sen and Queen Elizabeth II shaking hands in June 1952

Personal information
- Full name: Probir Kumar Sen
- Born: 31 May 1926; Comilla, Bengal Presidency, British India (now in Bangladesh)
- Died: 27 January 1970 (aged 43); South Calcutta, West Bengal, India
- Batting: Right-handed
- Role: Wicket-keeper

International information
- National side: India
- Test debut (cap 43): 1 January 1948 v Australia
- Last Test: 12 December 1952 v Pakistan

Career statistics
Competition	Tests	First-class
Matches	14	82
Runs scored	165	2,580
Batting average	11.78	23.24
100s/50s	0/0	3/11
Top score	25	168
Balls bowled	–	150
Wickets	–	7
Bowling average	–	15.14
5 wickets in innings	–	0
10 wickets in match	–	0
Best bowling	–	3/4
Catches/stumpings	20/11	108/36
- Source: CricInfo, 13 March 2019

Probir Kumar "Khokhan" Sen (31 May 1926 – 27 January 1970) was an Indian cricketer who represented his country in 14 Tests from 1948 to 1952. He was born in an eminent business family, to Amiya Sen and Basanti Sen.

== Biography ==
Probir Sen, known as "Khokhan", was the first Bengali to represent India in Test matches, and the first Bengali to keep wickets for India. His agility behind the stumps was beyond doubt, with 20 catches and 11 stumpings.

Sen played his first first-class cricket game representing Bengal in 1943, when he was only 17 years old and just out of school at La Martiniere Calcutta. A stocky right-handed wicketkeeper-batsman, Sen first toured with the Indian team in 1947–48 in Australia where he was to act as the reserve keeper to Jenni Irani. After impressing in the first-class fixtures he came into the side for the Third Test to make his Test debut at Melbourne on New Year's Day 1948. In the Fifth Test, also in Melbourne, he took four catches. Despite Australia making 575 runs he only conceded four byes. He was the only Indian wicket-keeper to stump Don Bradman, which he did in a four-day match against South Australia in 1947–48. When the West Indies toured India in 1948–49 he played his first home Test series and played in all five Tests.

His finest moment was in the final Test against England at Madras in 1951–52. Sen played a notable part in the historic victory, taking five stumpings, all off Vinoo Mankad, including four in the first innings to help his side to a famous win. After a tour of England in 1952 and a couple of Tests against the touring Pakistan team in 1952–53 he lost his place in the side.

With the bat Sen was a handy lower-order batsman, although he never made a Test half-century. Also an occasional bowler, during a Ranji Trophy game in 1954–55 against Orissa he took a hat-trick. Only two wicket-keepers have removed their pads and taken hat-tricks in first-class cricket: Probir Sen for Bengal against Orissa at Cuttack in 1954–55 and Alan Smith for Warwickshire against Essex at Clacton in 1965.

He finished his Ranji Trophy career with 1796 runs at 30.44.

Sen died in 1970 after playing a game of cricket at Calcutta. He had suffered a heart attack. He was survived by his wife, Reena Sen (whom he married in 1948, and who is the niece of the late Pankaj Gupta), his daughter Madhusree Dhar, his grandchildren Bikram, Debaki, and Aditi Dhar, and his son Abhijit Sen. His brother Ranabir Sen, a stylish left-handed batsman, played first-class cricket for Bengal.

== Legacy ==
In Sen's memory, the cricket tourney trophy, named 'P. Sen Memorial Trophy', is played in Kolkata every year, with top Indian and international players participating.

== Sources ==
- Teams Khokhan Sen played for
- Stats & Records
- Our Men Behind The Wicket
- Scorecard at Adelaide Oval: Bradman getting stumped in the 2nd innings after scoring a double hundrrd in the first innings
- First-class Batting and Fielding On Each Ground by Khokhan Sen
- Ranabir Sen profile
- Wisden – Obituaries in 1970
