= Vinoo Mankad =

Indian cricketer

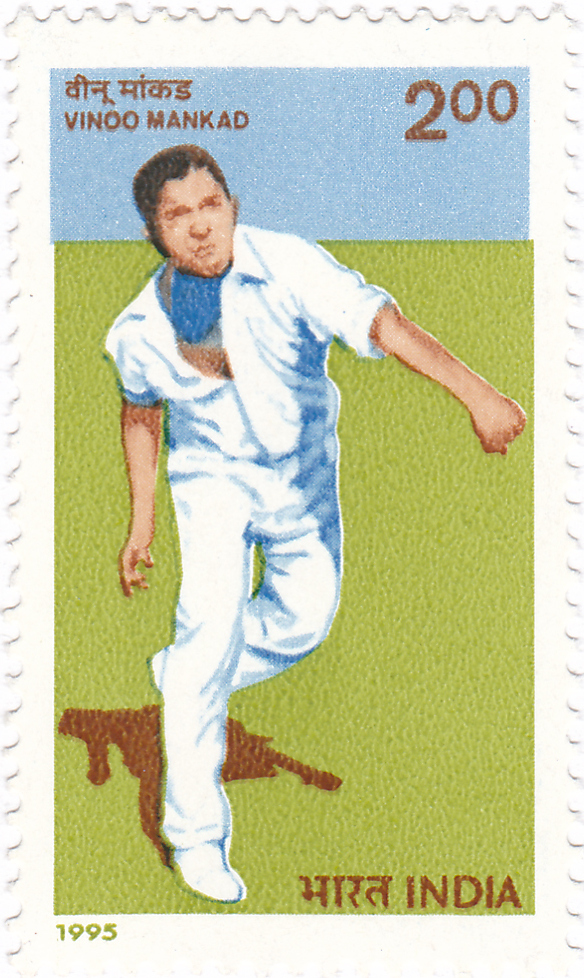
- Mankad on an Indian stamp

Personal information
- Full name: Mulvantrai Himmatlal Mankad
- Born: 12 April 1917; Jamnagar, Bombay Presidency, British India
- Died: 21 August 1978 (aged 61); Bombay, Maharashtra, India
- Height: 178 cm (5 ft 10 in)
- Batting: Right-handed
- Bowling: Slow left arm orthodox
- Relatives: Ashok Mankad (son); Nirupama Mankad (daughter-in-law); Harsh Mankad (grandson)

International information
- National side: India (1946–1959)
- Test debut (cap 30): 22 June 1946 v England
- Last Test: 11 February 1959 v West Indies

Domestic team information
- Years: Team
- 1935–1936: Western India
- 1936–1942: Nawanagar
- 1936–1946: Hindus
- 1943–1944: Maharashtra
- 1944–1951: Gujarat
- 1948–1949: Bengal
- 1950–1951: Saurashtra
- 1951–1956: Bombay
- 1956–1962: Rajasthan

Career statistics
Competition	Test	First-class
Matches	44	233
Runs scored	2,109	11,591
Batting average	31.47	34.70
100s/50s	5/6	26/52
Top score	231	231
Balls bowled	14,686	50,122
Wickets	162	782
Bowling average	32.32	24.53
5 wickets in innings	8	38
10 wickets in match	2	9
Best bowling	8/52	8/35
Catches/stumpings	33/–	190/–
- Source: Cricinfo, 24 June 2009

Mulvantrai Himmatlal "Vinoo" Mankad (12 April 1917 – 21 August 1978) was a former Captain of Indian cricket team and appeared in 44 Test matches for India between 1946 and 1959. He was best known for his world record setting opening partnership of 413 runs with Pankaj Roy in 1956, a record that stood for 52 years, and for running out a batsman "backing up" at the non-striker's end. Mankading in cricket is named after him. In June 2021, he was inducted into the ICC Cricket Hall of Fame.

== Early life ==
Vinoo Mankad was born on Thursday, 12 April 1917 in Jamnagar, in the erstwhile princely state of Nawangar (present-day Gujarat). He learnt how to bowl from cricketers Albert Wensley and KS Duleepsinhji, nephew of the legendary batsman Ranjitsinhji.

== Career ==
An opening batsman and slow left arm orthodox bowler, he played in 44 Tests for India, and made 2109 runs at an average of 31.47 including five Test centuries with a top score of 231. He also took 162 wickets at an average of 32.32, including eight five-wicket hauls. He is one of three cricketers to have batted in every position during his Test career. He was the first Indian to score 1000 Test runs and to take 100 test wickets. He also completed the double of 1000 Test runs and 100 Test wickets in just 23 test matches, which was a then world record and stood nearly for quarter of a century before being surpassed by Ian Botham. According to Scyld Berry, "he was the best left-arm spinner in the world in his time, and the best spinning all-rounder".

=== 1946 England tour ===
Mankad was included in the India squad that toured England in 1946. Leading up to the First Test of the three-match series, he had played 11 first-class games on the tour averaging 20.9 with the bat and 14.2 with the ball, having picked 44 wickets, the best for India thus far as a bowler. He made his debut at the Lord's opening the batting for India before being bowled out for 14 by England spinner Doug Wright. After "long spells of bowling" in England's first innings, Mankad top-scored for his team with 67 in the second innings. India went on to lose the match by ten wickets. However, Wisden wrote in praise of Mankad calling him a "valuable all-round player" alongside teammates Lala Amarnath and Vijay Hazare. Former England Test cricketer Patsy Hendren rated Mankad as India's "best all-rounder". In the Second Test in Manchester, Mankad claimed a five-wicket haul in England's first innings. He contributed 42 with the bat and picked two wickets in a drawn cause in the final Test at the Oval. Mankad completed the tour with a double of a thousand runs and hundred wickets, the first tourist to achieve the feat since Learie Constantine of the West Indies in 1928. He finished with 1,120 runs at 28.00 and 129 wickets at 20.76 apiece. John Arlott wrote of him: "From his first over in England, Mankad was a good slow left-hander. By the end of the tour, there is little doubt that he was the best slow left-arm bowler in the world." Wisden chose him as one of its five Cricketers of the Year.

=== Australia tour ===
Mankad's 1947–48 Australia tour began on a positive note after he claimed a five-wicket haul in the first match in Western Australia's first innings. He picked four wickets in the second game against South Australia including that of Don Bradman, while making an unbeaten 116 with the bat. Against Cricket Australia XI, he returned figures of 8/84 in the final innings helping his team win by 47 runs. He had a poor start to the Test series, and was dismissed by Australia's pacer Ray Lindwall for 0 and 7 at Brisbane, and 5 and 5 at Sydney. Mankad subsequently modified his back-lift of the bat from high to low for the remainder of the series after being advised by Lindwall himself and went on to score centuries at the Third and Fifth Tests in Melbourne. In reply to Australia's 394 in the Third Test, Mankad put on 124 runs for the first wicket with Chandu Sarwate, and reached his debut century in 139 minutes in the first innings. After a first innings score of 49 in Adelaide, Mankad scored 111 in the last Test in Melbourne, his making his second century of the series. Batting for five hours, he added 124 runs with Hemu Adhikari for the second wicket. However, India went on to lose the match and the series, 4–0. Mankad finished the tour with 889 first-class runs at 38.65 which included a total of three centuries, while claiming 61 wickets with the ball, the most for India.

=== Later career ===
Mankad's best performance was against England at Lord's in 1952. In the first innings, he top-scored with 72. During England's first innings, he bowled 73 overs and took 5 wickets for 196 runs. In India's second innings in that Test match, he top-scored again with 184 runs out of India's total of 378. Though England won the game easily, Mankad's all-around performance salvaged India's pride in a series where they were heavily outmatched. Mankad was the first player in more than 30 years to score a 100 and take five wickets in the same Test and the first Indian to achieve this feat. As such, he is one of only three non-England 'away' players whose names appear on both batting and bowling honours boards at Lords. (The other two are Keith Miller and Sir Gary Sobers).

Also memorable was his role earlier in the same year against England in Madras. He took 8/52 in England's first innings and 4/53 in the second helping India beat England for the first time in a Test match.

In 1956 he hit 231 against New Zealand at Chennai and together with Pankaj Roy established the then world record opening partnership of 413 runs which stood for 52 years. His score was a Test record for India at the time and would remain so until it was broken in 1983 by Sunil Gavaskar.

Playing for Tonge in the Bolton Cricket League, Mankad picked up 54 wickets in the 1961 season, becoming the first player to claim more than 50 wickets in a season in the league.

== Mankading ==
Mankad caused controversy in 1947/48 on India's tour of Australia when he ran out Bill Brown at the non-striker's end in the second Test. Mankad paused during the delivery stride of his bowling run-up and broke the wicket while Brown was out of his crease backing up the striker in the accepted manner. He had done the same thing to Brown in the game against an Australian XI earlier on the tour, but his running out of Brown infuriated the Australian media, and running someone out in this way is now referred to around the world as "Mankading". Although such an act is not an infringement of the laws of cricket, to some it is considered unsporting and against the spirit of the game.

However, famed cricketer Sir Don Bradman in his autobiography defended Mankad's action, saying:

For the life of me, I can't understand why [the press] questioned his sportsmanship. The laws of cricket make it quite clear that the non-striker must keep within his ground until the ball has been delivered. If not, why is the provision there which enables the bowler to run him out? By backing up too far or too early, the non-striker is very obviously gaining an unfair advantage.

While perfectly legal, some contend that by convention, a bowler should at least warn a batsman who persists in backing up too far before dismissing him in that fashion. Mankad himself had warned Brown before dismissing him in this fashion in the earlier game. Courtney Walsh likewise received praise for warning rather than dismissing Saleem Jaffar, who was backing up during the 1987 World Cup.

== Honours ==
An under 19 domestic tournament in India organized by the BCCI, the Vinoo Mankad Trophy, has been named in his honour.

The Government of India awarded him the civilian honour of the Padma Bhushan in 1973.

The Wankhede Stadium in Mumbai has a gate named after him.

A statue in his honor was erected in his birthplace, Jamnagar, Gujarat.

He was one of the ten inductees in the ICC Cricket Hall of Fame ahead of the 2021 ICC World Test Championship final.
