= Gogumal Kishenchand =

Indian cricketer (1925–1997)

Personal information
- Full name: Gogumal Kishenchand Harisinghani
- Born: 14 April 1925; Karachi, Bombay Presidency, British India
- Died: 16 April 1997 (aged 72); Baroda, Gujarat, India
- Batting: Right-handed
- Bowling: Right-arm medium

International information
- National side: India
- Test debut (cap 38): 28 November 1947 v Australia
- Last Test: 23 October 1952 v Pakistan

Career statistics
| Competition | Test | First-class |
|---|---|---|
| Matches | 5 | 127 |
| Runs scored | 89 | 7,187 |
| Batting average | 8.90 | 47.91 |
| 100s/50s | 0/0 | 15/40 |
| Top score | 44 | 218 |
| Balls bowled | – | 1,972 |
| Wickets | – | 37 |
| Bowling average | – | 31.94 |
| 5 wickets in innings | – | 1 |
| 10 wickets in match | – | 0 |
| Best bowling | – | 5/67 |
| Catches/stumpings | 1/– | 93/1 |
- Source: ESPNcricinfo, 3 September 2022

Gogumal Kishenchand Harisinghani (14 April 1925 – 16 April 1997) was an Indian Test cricketer.

Kishenchand had a crouched stance but was a good driver and hooker, and an occasional leg break bowler. While studying in the Model High School in Karachi, he was elected the best schoolboy cricketer in Sind for the year 1939/40. In that season he hit twelve hundreds with a highest score of 175 notout. He made his debut for Sind at the age of 15. In his first season in the Bombay Pentangular, he hit a brilliant 75 against the Parsis and a 175* against Muslims.

He migrated to the Western India States in the early 1940s, and later played for Gujarat, and Baroda as well for Sind. In his second term with Sind, he captained the team in 1945/46.

He scored 264 runs at 26.40 in his eight unofficial Tests with a highest score of 73. In the Pentangular matches, he scored 611 at an average of 101, with three hundreds. His career highest first class score of 218 in the Zonal Quadrangular in 1946/47 helped his selection to the tour of Sri Lanka, and Australia in 1947/48.

He did not achieve much in the Test matches but it was off his bowling that Don Bradman completed his 100th first class century. When Bradman reached 99, in the match for an Australian XI against the Indians, the Indian captain Lala Amarnath brought Kishenchand on to bowl. It was his first try at bowling during the tour. After playing a few balls carefully, Bradman took a single past mid-on to reach his hundred.

He scored a duck in each of the five Tests that he played – four on the 1947/48 tour of Australia and one against Pakistan in 1952/53.

Kishenchand served the Maharaja of Baroda as a member of his staff, and later worked for Satyadev Chemicals in Baroda. He was a small man, standing only 5 feet and four inches. His death was due to a heart attack.
