= Len Johnson (cricketer) =

Australian cricketer

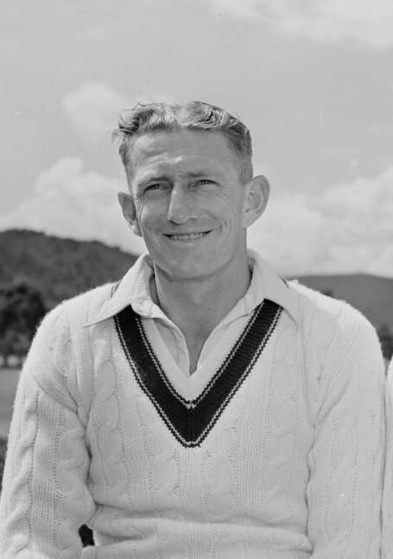

Personal information
- Full name: Leonard Joseph Johnson
- Born: 18 March 1919; Ipswich, Queensland, Australia
- Died: 20 April 1977 (aged 58); Silkstone, Queensland
- Batting: Right-handed
- Bowling: Right-arm fast-medium

International information
- National side: Australia
- Only Test (cap 179): 6 February 1948 v India

Domestic team information
- Years: Team
- 1946/47–1952/53: Queensland

Career statistics
Competition	Test	First-class
Matches	1	56
Runs scored	25	1,139
Batting average	–	16.75
100s/50s	0/0	0/3
Top score	25*	75
Balls bowled	282	14,408
Wickets	6	218
Bowling average	12.33	23.17
5 wickets in innings	0	16
10 wickets in match	0	1
Best bowling	3/8	7/43
Catches/stumpings	2/–	35/–
- Source: Cricinfo, 27 June 2016

Leonard Joseph Johnson (18 March 1919 – 20 April 1977) was an Australian cricketer who played in one Test match in 1948.

== Cricket career ==
Johnson gained recognition representing Queensland in the "Sheffield Shield" competition for Australian troops at Bougainville, in the Solomons, at the end of World War II. After the war he played for Queensland in the official Sheffield Shield from 1946–47 to 1952–53.

He toured New Zealand with an Australian second XI in 1950, but despite his talent he only played one Test: against India at Melbourne in the final Test of the 1947–48 series. He scored 25 not out and took 3 for 66 and 3 for 8. Earlier in the season he had taken seven wickets in Queensland's victory over the Indian team. It is thought that Sam Loxton won preference over him in selection for the 1948 tour of England.

He achieved his best bowling figures of 7 for 43 twice: against New South Wales in 1949–50, and against Western Australia in 1951–52. He ended his playing career with a tally of 171 wickets in 43 Shield matches for Queensland, a state record until it was overtaken by Ross Duncan and Peter Allan.
