= Ron Wright (umpire) =

Australian cricket umpire (1913–1968)

Ronald James John Wright (1913 – 14 June 1968) was an Australian Test cricket umpire.

Wright umpired 13 Test matches between 1948 and 1959. His first Test was between Australia and India at Adelaide Oval on 23 January to 28 January 1948, a match won by Australia by an innings, with Don Bradman scoring 201, Lindsay Hassett scoring 198 not out, and Ray Lindwall taking 7 wickets in the second innings. Wright's partner in this match was George Borwick. His last match was between Australia and the visiting England at Melbourne on 13 February to 18 February 1959, where the home team won comfortably. Les Townsend, officiating in his only Test match, was Wright's partner in this match.

Wright umpired 61 first-class matches between 1945 and 1961. Apart from eight of the Test matches he officiated in, all his matches as an umpire were in Melbourne.

== See also ==
- List of Test cricket umpires
