= Andrew Barlow =

Australian cricket umpire (1899–1961)

Personal information
- Full name: Andrew Nicholas Barlow
- Born: 3 July 1899; Newport, Melbourne, Victoria, Australia
- Died: 13 July 1961 (aged 62); Melbourne, Victoria, Australia
- Role: Umpire

Umpiring information
- Tests umpired: 11 (1931–1951)
- WTests umpired: 1 (1949)
- Source: Cricinfo, 12 July 2013

Andrew Nicholas Barlow (3 July 1899 – 13 July 1961) was an Australian Test cricket umpire.

Barlow was born at Newport, Victoria. During World War I, he volunteered for service in the Australian Imperial Force in September 1916 at the age of 17 years and 2 months. Enlisting in Melbourne, he embarked for overseas in October 1916 and served with the 6th Battalion. He returned to Australia in December 1918. In his junior years, Barlow played cricket as a wicketkeeper for Newport, but war injuries including the partial loss of a thumb prevented him from returning to the game as a player after the war. His umpiring career began in 1922–23, in the Victorian Junior Cricket Association. In 1927–28 he began umpiring second XI matches for the Victorian Cricket Association before stepping up to first XI matches and interstate games the next season.

Barlow umpired eleven Test matches between 1931 and 1951. His first match, at the age of 31, was between Australia and the West Indies at the Melbourne on 13 February to 14 January 1931. This game resulted in Australia taking just two days to win by an innings, with Don Bradman scoring 152 and Bert Ironmonger taking 11 wickets. Barlow's partner in this match, Joseph Richards, was standing in his only Test match.

Barlow did not umpire another Test match until the series against India in the 1947/48 season, when he stood in four Test matches. He stood in four matches against Freddie Brown's English team in 1950/51. He finished his career as he began it, in a match against the West Indies, at Sydney on 30 November to 5 December 1951.

In addition to umpiring in Tests, he also umpired 86 first class cricket games, and AFL matches in Victoria. He died at Melbourne, Victoria, aged 62.

== See also ==
- Australian Test Cricket Umpires
- List of Test umpires
