= Vijay Hazare =

Former Indian cricketer (born 1915

Personal information
- Full name: Vijay Samuel Hazare
- Born: 11 March 1915; Sangli, Bombay Presidency, British India
- Died: 18 December 2004 (aged 89); Vadodara, Gujarat, India
- Batting: Right-handed
- Bowling: Right-arm medium pace
- Role: All -rounder

International information
- National side: India
- Test debut (cap 28): 22 June 1946 v England
- Last Test: 28 March 1953 v West Indies

Domestic team information
- Years: Team
- 1934–1942: Maharashtra
- 1935–1939: Central India
- 1941–1961: Baroda
- 1957–1958: Holkar

Career statistics
Competition	Tests	First-class
Matches	30	238
Runs scored	2,192	18,740
Batting average	47.65	58.38
100s/50s	7/9	60/73
Top score	164*	316*
Balls bowled	2,840	38,447
Wickets	20	595
Bowling average	61.00	24.61
5 wickets in innings	0	27
10 wickets in match	0	3
Best bowling	4/29	8/90
Catches/stumpings	11/–	166/–
- Source: Cricket Archive, 22 October 2010

Vijay Samuel Hazare ( 11 March 1915 – 18 December 2004) was an Indian cricketer. He captained India in 14 matches between 1951 and 1953. In India's 25th Test match, nearly 20 years after India achieved Test status, he led India to its first Test cricket win (and the only victory under his captaincy) in 1951–52 against England at Madras, winning by an innings and eight runs in a match that began on the day that King George VI died. He received the C. K. Nayudu Lifetime Achievement Award in 1996, the highest honour bestowed by BCCI on a former player.

== Early life ==
Hazare was born in Sangli, into Marathi Christian family, in the then Bombay Presidency of British India in 1916, one of eight children of a school teacher.

== Career ==
Primarily a right-hand batsman, Hazare was also a right-hand medium-pace bowler. A "shy, retiring" man (according to Wisden in 1952), it was widely thought that he was not a natural captain and that his batting suffered as a result. His rival, Vijay Merchant said that the captaincy prevented Hazare from becoming India's finest batsman: "It was one of the tragedies of cricket."

Even so, Hazare's Test record is very respectable: he amassed 2,192 runs in 30 Test matches with a batting average of 47.65. His first-class record is even more impressive, with a batting average of 58.38 for his 18,740 runs. He scored 60 first-class centuries (including 7 in Tests), the fourth highest for an Indian player and 10 first-class double centuries (including six during World War II, when India was the only Test cricket-playing country to continue holding its domestic first-class cricket competition without interruption).

His bowling record was more modest, and he took 595 first-class wickets (including 19 in Tests, and Donald Bradman's wicket three times) at a bowling average of 24.61. On the Indian domestic circuit, Hazare played for the Maharashtra, Central India and Baroda teams.

Some of his notable achievements include:

- First Indian batsman to score a triple century in first-class cricket (considering KS Duleepsinhji as an English cricketer)
- First Indian to score two triple centuries:
  - the first, his highest score, was 316 not out for Maharashtra against Poona in 1939–40
  - the second was 309 out of 387 for The Rest against The Hindus at Bombay in 1943–44. Despite his innings, The Rest lost the match by an innings. It included a partnership of 300 with his brother, Vivek Hazare. Vijay scored 266 (88.6% of the partnership) of the 300 runs while Vivek contributed 21. Hazare scored 79.84% of his team's score, then a world record, and it is the second highest individual score in a losing cause. The Rest's total is the smallest completed innings to contain a triple century.
- First Indian to score a century in each innings of a Test match (116 and 145 on successive days against Australia in Adelaide in 1947–48, which was the same team that became known as The Invincibles)
- Against England at Kanpur in 1951–52, Hazare also became the first Indian batsman to score a pair (a duck in both innings)
- First Indian player to score a century in three successive Test matches
- First Indian player to make fifty centuries in his first class career
- Highest partnership for any wicket in first-class cricket (577 runs with Gul Mahomed for Baroda against Holkar in the final of the Ranji Trophy at Baroda in 1947. This record stood for many years, and was only broken in 2006 by Kumar Sangakkara and Mahela Jayawardene who put on 624 for Sri Lanka against South Africa.
- First Indian player to complete 1000 Test Runs

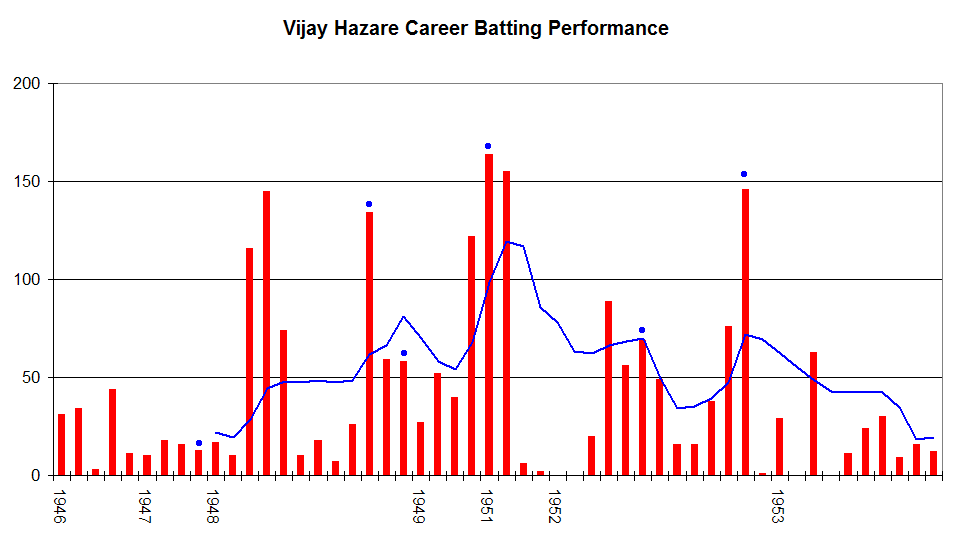
Vijay Hazare's career performance graph.

In retirement, he was for a short while an Indian Test cricket selector. He has been honoured with a trophy in his name, the Vijay Hazare Trophy, a zonal-cricket tournament in India. He died in December 2004 following prolonged illness caused by intestinal cancer.

He and Jasu Patel were the first cricketers to be honoured with the Padma Shri.

== Domestic cricket ==
Hazare was the leading run scorer of 1939–40 Ranji Trophy season. His team Maharashtra won its first title in that season, they defeated United Province cricket team in the final at Poona (Now Pune). In 1940–41 Ranji trophy he made 100 in the final and took 2 wickets. Maharashtra won the that season by defeating Madras cricket team in the final. Since that season Maharashtra not able to won Ranji trophy again.

== Legacy ==
- Board of Control for Cricket in India (BCCI) named its primer one-day domestic cricket championship after Hazare as, Vijay Hazare Trophy.
- Received BCCI's C. K. Nayudu Lifetime Achievement Award in 1996.

Preceded by Lala Amarnath	Indian National Test Cricket Captain; 1951/2–1952	Succeeded by Lala Amarnath
Preceded by Lala Amarnath	Indian National Test Cricket Captain; 1952/3	Succeeded by Vinoo Mankad
