= Pakistani cricket team in India in 1952–53 =

International cricket tour

Pakistan cricket team in India in 1952-53
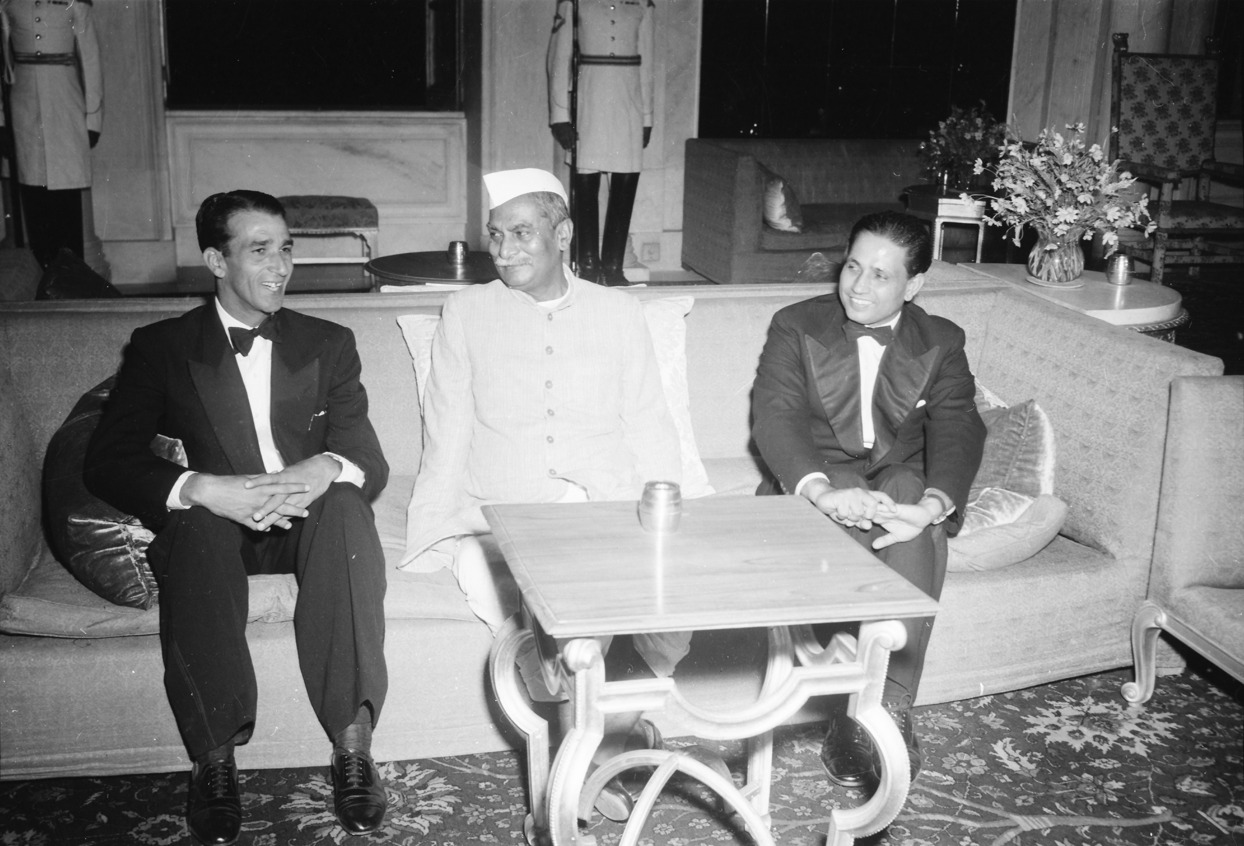
- Captains Abdul Kardar (left) and Lala Amarnath (right) with Indian President Rajendra Prasad (center) on the day of the first test, 16 October 1952
- Date: 10 October 1952 – 24 December 1952
- Location: India
- Result: India won the 5-Test series 2-1
Teams
- India: Pakistan
Captains
- Lala Amarnath: Abdul Kardar
Most runs
- Polly Umrigar (258) Vijay Hazare (223) Vinoo Mankad (129): Waqar Hasan (357); Hanif Mohammad (287); Nazar Mohammad (277)
Most wickets
- Vinoo Mankad (25) Ghulam Ahmed (12) Lala Amarnath (9): Fazal Mahmood (20); Mahmood Hussain (12); Amir Elahi (7)

The Pakistan national cricket team toured India in the 1952–53 season, playing five Tests. The First Test was the first-ever Test for Pakistan after its inception and the second match resulted in Pakistan's first Test victory. India won the series 2–1 with two Tests being drawn.

== The Pakistan team ==
- Abdul Kardar (captain)
- Imtiaz Ahmed
- Khurshid Ahmed
- Maqsood Ahmed
- Zulfiqar Ahmed
- Israr Ali
- Rusi Dinshaw
- Amir Elahi
- Waqar Hasan
- Anwar Hussain
- Mahmood Hussain
- Khalid Ibadulla
- Fazal Mahmood
- Hanif Mohammad
- Khan Mohammad
- Nazar Mohammad
- Wazir Mohammad
- Khalid Qureshi

== Tour matches ==
=== Three-day: North Zone v Pakistanis ===
10–12 October 1952
Scorecard

Pakistanis	v	North Zone
319 (102 overs); Hanif Mohammad 121; Prakash Bhandari 5/39 (16 overs)		220 (91.2 overs); Chandrasekhar Gadkari 59; Fazal Mahmood 4/64 (31 overs)
241/2 (78 overs); Hanif Mohammad 109*; Chandrasekhar Gadkari 1/19 (4 overs)

Match drawn
Gandhi Sports Complex Ground, Amritsar
Umpires: Santosh Ganguli and I. Ghosh

- Pakistanis won the toss and elected to bat.
- Prakash Bhandari (North Zone) picked his maiden five-wicket haul in first-class matches.

=== Three-day: Central Zone v Pakistanis ===
31 October–2 November 1952
Scorecard

Pakistanis	v	Central Zone
356 (94.3 overs); Imtiaz Ahmed 213*; Hiralal Gaekwad 4/131 (35 overs)		271 (80.5 overs); Syed Mushtaq Ali 73; Mahmood Hussain 5/116 (22.5 overs)
275/5d (88 overs); Abdul Hafeez Kardar 106; Syed Rahim 3/67 (19 overs)		98/8 (26 overs); Balbir Khanna 43; Khalid Qureshi 5/21 (9 overs)

Match drawn
Madhya Pradesh Cricket Association Ground, Nagpur

- Pakistanis won the toss and elected to bat.
- Khurshid Ahmed scored a century on debut in first-class matches.
- Mahmood Hussain claimed his first five-wicket haul in first-class matches.

=== Three-day: West Zone v Pakistanis ===
4–6 November 1952
Scorecard

West Zone	v	Pakistanis
332/6d (120 overs); Pananmal Punjabi 142; Maqsood Ahmed 2/66 (19 overs)		292 (95.5 overs); Wazir Mohammad 104*; Shah Nyalchand 5/114 (39 overs)
123/3d (36 overs); Ebrahim Maka 56; Maqsood Ahmed 1/23 (9 overs)		54/2 (20 overs); Maqsood Ahmed 25; Shah Nyalchand 1/2 (2 overs)

Match drawn
Commerce College Ground, Ahmedabad
Umpires: Dinkar Desai and Santosh Ganguli

- West Zone won the toss and elected to bat.
- Pananmal Punjabi (West Zone) and Wazir Mohammad (Pakistanis) both made their first centuries in first-class matches.

=== Three-day: Bombay v Pakistanis ===
8–10 November 1952
Scorecard

Pakistanis	v	Bombay
517/4d (156 overs); Hanif Mohammad 203*; Sadashiv Shinde 2/156 (56 overs)		324/3 (154 overs); Vijay Manjrekar 173; Israr Ali 1/35 (21 overs)

Match drawn
Brabourne Stadium, Bombay
Umpires: M. G. Bhave and Noshirvan Nagarwala

- Pakistanis won the toss and elected to bat.

=== Three-day: South Zone v Pakistanis ===
21–23 November 1952
Scorecard

Pakistanis	v	South Zone
351/6d (119 overs); Nazar Mohammad 156*; N. Kannayiram 3/67 (20 overs)		352/6d (160.4 overs); L. T. Adisesh 87; Khalid Qureshi 2/117 (55 overs)
44/2 (11 overs); Imtiaz Ahmed 21; Edulji Aibara 1/11 (3 overs); M. Suryanarayan 1/11 (2 overs)

Match drawn
Lal Bahadur Shastri Stadium, Hyderabad
Umpires: Bapu Joshi and V. S. Natarajan

- Pakistanis won the toss and elected to bat.

=== Three-day: Indian Universities v Pakistanis ===
5–7 December 1952
Scorecard

Indian Universities	v	Pakistanis
340/8d (137 overs); Ramnath Kenny 99; Khalid Qureshi 4/90 (41 overs)		92 (38.4 overs); Hanif Mohammad 24; Jayasinghrao Ghorpade 6/19 (7.4 overs)
		16/0 (f/o ) (7 overs); Nazar Mohammad 8*

Match drawn
Central College Ground, Bangalore

- Indian Universities won the toss and elected to bat.
- Hanif Mohammad (Pakistanis) passed 1,000 runs in first-class matches.

=== Three-day: East Zone v Pakistanis ===
19–21 December 1952
Scorecard

Pakistanis	v	East Zone
345/7d (100 overs); Nazar Mohammad 123; Sudhir Das 2/69 (20 overs)		211 (59 overs); Benjamin Frank 93; Mahmood Hussain 5/52 (20 overs)
200/7d (55 overs); Khurshid Ahmed 69; Sudhir Das 3/54 (12 overs)		157/6 (58.5 overs); S. Om Prakash 50*; Amir Elahi 3/68 (22 overs)

Match drawn
Keenan Stadium, Jamshedpur

- Pakistanis won the toss and elected to bat.
- Raymond Lewis and B. Moitra (both East Zone) played respectively their debut and only first-class matches, while Nazar Mohammad (Pakistanis) played his last.

== Test matches ==
=== 1st Test ===
16–18 October 1952 (4-day match)
Scorecard

India	v	Pakistan
372 (139.4 overs); Hemu Adhikari 81; Amir Elahi 4/134 (39.4 overs)		150 (104.3 overs); Hanif Mohammad 51; Vinoo Mankad 8/52 (47 overs)
		152 (58.2 overs); Abdul Kardar 43; Vinoo Mankad 5/79 (24.2 overs)

India won by an innings and 70 runs
Feroz Shah Kotla, Delhi
Umpires: Balkrishna Mohoni (Ind) and Mysore Vijayasarathi (Ind)

- India won the toss and elected to bat.
- This was the first Test match for Pakistan. For all the Pakistani players except Abdul Kardar and Amir Elahi this was the debut Test. Kardar and Elahi had earlier played Test cricket for India.
- Hemu Adhikari and Ghulam Ahmed broke the record for highest tenth wicket partnership for India, before Sachin Tendulkar and Zaheer Khan surpassed it in 2004 (133).
- Vinoo Mankad's 8/52 in Pakistan's first innings and 13/131 in the match were the best bowling figures recorded by an India bowler.

=== 2nd Test ===
23–26 October 1952 (4-day match)
Scorecard

India	v	Pakistan
106 (55.1 overs); Pankaj Roy 30; Fazal Mahmood 5/52 (24.1 overs)		331 (194.3 overs); Nazar Mohammad 124; Ghulam Ahmed 3/83 (45 overs)
182 (76.3 overs); Lala Amarnath 61; Fazal Mahmood 7/42 (27.3 overs)

Pakistan won by an innings and 43 runs
University Ground, Lucknow
Umpires: Balkrishna Mohoni (Ind) and Jamshed Patel (Ind)

- India won the toss and elected to bat.
- Hiralal Gaekwad and Shah Nyalchand (both Ind), and Mahmood Hussain and Zulfiqar Ahmed (both Pak) made their debut in Tests.

=== 3rd Test ===
13–16 November 1952
(4-day match)
Scorecard

Pakistan	v	India
186 (73 overs); Waqar Hasan 81; Lala Amarnath 4/40 (21 overs)		387/4d (112 overs); Vijay Hazare 146; Mahmood Hussain 3/121 (35 overs)
242 (149.2 overs); Hanif Mohammad 96; Vinoo Mankad 5/72 (65 overs)		45/0 (15.2 overs); Vinoo Mankad 35; Abdul Kardar 0/2 (2 overs)

India won by 10 wickets
Brabourne Stadium, Bombay
Umpires: Jamshed Patel (Ind) and Mysore Vijayasarathi (Ind)

- Pakistan won the toss and elected to bat.
- Bal Dani, Madhav Apte and Vijay Rajindernath (all Ind), and Wazir Mohammad (Pak) made their debut in Tests.

=== 4th Test ===
28 November–1 December 1952
(4-day match)
Scorecard

Pakistan	v	India
344 (110.5 overs); Abdul Kardar 79; Ramesh Divecha 2/36 (19 overs)		175/6 (74 overs); Polly Umrigar 62; Abdul Kardar 2/37 (21 overs)

Match drawn
Madras Cricket Club Ground, Chepauk, Madras
Umpires: Noshirvan Nagarwala (Ind) and Prasad Sinha (Ind)

- Pakistan won the toss and elected to bat.
- No play was possible on the last two days because of rain.
- Ebrahim Maka (Ind) made his debut in Tests.

=== 5th Test ===
12–15 Dec 1952
(4-day match)
Scorecard

Pakistan	v	India
257 (116 overs); Imtiaz Ahmed 57; Dattu Phadkar 5/72 (32 overs)		397 (144 overs); Deepak Shodhan 110; Fazal Mahmood 4/141 (64 overs)
236/7d (120 overs); Waqar Hasan 97; Ghulam Ahmed 3/56 (33 overs)		28/0 (6 overs); Datta Gaekwad 20; Nazar Mohammad 0/4 (2 overs)

Match drawn
Eden Gardens, Calcutta
Umpires: Jamshed Patel (Ind) and Mysore Vijayasarathi (Ind)

- India won the toss and elected to field.
- Deepak Shodhan (Ind) made his debut in Tests.

== Aftermath ==
In 2003, to mark the 50th anniversary of the tour, the surviving members of the Pakistani team were awarded a commemorative medallion, a cash prize of 250,000 rupees, and a current green Pakistan blazer.
