= Australian cricket team in India in 1959–60 =

International cricket tour

	Australia	India
- Dates: 12 December 1959 – 28 January 1960
Captains	Richie Benaud	Gulabrai Ramchand

Test series
- Result: Australia won the 5-match series 2–1
Most runs	Norm O'Neill (376)	Nari Contractor (438)
Most wickets	Richie Benaud (29)	Jasu Patel (19)

The Australian national cricket team toured India in the winter of 1959–60. The two teams played five Tests, with Australia winning two, India winning one, and two others being drawn. The Australians also played several matches against domestic Indian squads.

At the time of its arrival in India, the Australian cricket team was acclaimed as the strongest side in the world, having won 11 of its last 16 Tests and lost none. In the years just prior, they had not only defeated India, but also South Africa, England, and Pakistan as well. The confident Aussies, led by captain Richie Benaud, featured such names as Neil Harvey, Norm O'Neill, Ray Lindwall, and Ian Meckiff among others. Meanwhile, India had dropped 11 of its last 13 Tests, including humbling defeats at the hands of Australia, the West Indies, and England, and had not won a single one. The Indians seemed to be struggling with every aspect of the game – batting, bowling, and fielding – not to mention leadership and the maintenance of a "fighting spirit." Hence, this series between Benaud's Australians and Gulabrai Ramchand's Indian team had a true David vs. Goliath nature to it.

== Touring party ==
- Richie Benaud (captain)
- Neil Harvey (vice captain)
- Peter Burge
- Alan Davidson
- Ken Mackay
- Barry Jarman
- Colin McDonald
- Ian Meckiff
- Les Favell
- Wally Grout
- Lindsay Kline
- Ray Lindwall
- Norm O'Neill
- Gordon Rorke
- Gavin Stevens

== Test matches ==
=== 1st Test ===
12–16 December
Scorecard

India	v	Australia
135 (59.4 overs); Nari Contractor 41; Richie Benaud 3/0 (3.4 overs)		468 (143 overs); Neil Harvey 114; Polly Umrigar 4/49 (15.3 overs)
206 (111 overs); Pankaj Roy 99; Richie Benaud 5/76 (46 overs)

Australia won by an innings and 127 runs
Feroz Shah Kotla, Delhi
Umpires: Santosh Ganguli and Mohammad Yunus

=== 2nd Test ===
19–24 December
Scorecard

India	v	Australia
152 (70.1 overs); Bapu Nadkarni 25; Alan Davidson 5/31 (20.1 overs)		219 (77.5 overs); Colin McDonald 53; Jasu Patel 9/69 (35.5 overs)
291 (144.3 overs); Nari Contractor 74; Alan Davidson 7/93 (57.3 overs)		105 (57.4 overs); Colin McDonald 34; Jasu Patel 5/55 (25.4 overs)

India won by 119 runs
Green Park Stadium, Kanpur
Umpires: Santosh Ganguli and Bapu Joshi

The second Test at Kanpur was notable for being India's first-ever Test victory over the Australians. Indian off-spinner Jasu Patel distinguished himself, taking 14 wickets in the match (nine wickets in the first innings and five in the second). He would go on to take 19 wickets in the series.

=== 3rd Test ===
1–6 January
Scorecard

India	v	Australia
289 (142.5 overs); Nari Contractor 108; Alan Davidson 4/62 (34.5 overs)		387/8 d (140 overs); Norm O'Neill 163; Bapu Nadkarni 6/105 (51 overs)
226/5 dec. (101 overs); Abbas Ali Baig 58; Ian Meckiff 3/67 (28 overs)		34/1 (8 overs); Wally Grout 22; Pankaj Roy 1/6 (2 overs)

Match drawn
Brabourne Stadium, Bombay
Umpires: Habib Choudhury and Noshirvan Nagarwala

=== 4th Test ===
13–17 January
Scorecard

Australia	v	India
342 (153 overs); Les Favell 101; Ramakant Desai 4/93 (41 overs)		149 (77.1 overs); Budhi Kunderan 71; Richie Benaud 5/43 (32.1 overs)
		138 (105 overs); Nari Contractor 41; Richie Benaud 3/43 (35 overs)

Australia won by an innings and 55 runs
Nehru Stadium, Madras
Umpires: Narayan Sane and Mysore Vijayasarathi

=== 5th Test ===
23–28 January
Scorecard

India	v	Australia
194 (89.3 overs); C. D. Gopinath 39; Alan Davidson 3/37 (16 overs)		331 (111.1 overs); Norm O'Neill 113; Ramakant Desai 4/111 (36 overs)
339 (146.2 overs); M. L. Jaisimha 74; Richie Benaud 4/103 (48 overs)		121/2 (52 overs); Les Favell 62; Nari Contractor 1/9 (5 overs)

Match drawn
Eden Gardens, Calcutta
Umpires: Santosh Ganguli and Narayan Sane

== Tour matches ==
=== Three-day: Indian Board President's XI v Australians ===
27–29 December
Scorecard

Indian Board President's XI	v	Australia
293 (90.2 overs); Man Sood 73; Lindsay Kline 4/72 (27 overs)		554/6d (134 overs); Norm O'Neill 284; William Ghosh 3/195 (40 overs)
143/5 (36 overs); Manohar Hardikar 59; Richie Benaud 2/13 (8 overs)

Match drawn
Commerce College Ground, Ahmedabad
Umpires: Habib Choudhury and Badami Satyaji Rao

=== Three-day: Indian Universities v Australians ===
9–11 January 1960
Scorecard

Australians	v	Indian Universities
556/9d (103 overs); Peter Burge 157; Deepak Das Gupta 2/109 (21 overs)		231 (90.1 overs); M. L. Jaisimha 51; Ken Mackay 3/37 (25 overs)
		213/6 (f/o) (56.5 overs); M. L. Jaisimha 66; Gavin Stevens 2/16 (6 overs)

Match drawn
Central College Ground, Bangalore
Umpires: B. Satyaji Rao and I. Gopalakrishnan

- Sudhakar Adhikari (Indian Universities) made his first-class debut.
- Baba Sidhaye (Indian Universities) passed 1,000 runs in first-class cricket.
