= Baroda Cricket Association =

Governing body of cricket in Vadodara city of Gujarat state, India

- Sport: Cricket
- Jurisdiction: Baroda, Gujarat, India
- Abbreviation: BCA
- Founded: 1937
- Affiliation: Board of Control for Cricket in India
- Headquarters: BCA House, Vadodara
- Location: Vadodara
- President: Pranav Amin
- Secretary: Ajit Lele

Official website
- cricketbaroda.com

Baroda Cricket Association is the governing body of the cricket activities in the Vadodara city of Gujarat state in India and the Baroda cricket team. It is affiliated to the Board of Control for Cricket in India.

Many past and present India national cricket team players, such as Nayan Mongia, Zaheer Khan, Vaibhav Patel, Hardik Pandya, Krunal Pandya, Jitesh Sharma and Irfan Pathan played at some point.

== History ==
Cricket was introduced to Vadodara city by Maharaja of Baroda Sayajirao Gaekwad in 1934 and Moti Bagh Stadium was the home of the Baroda cricket. Since then Baroda has emerged as Ranji Trophy Champions in the year 1942-43, 1946–47, 1949–50, 1957–58 and 2000-01.

Maharaja Fatehsinghrao Gaekwad was President of BCCI from 1963 to 1965 & had gone to England as a Manager of Indian Team in the year 1952 & later was sent to Pakistan as a Manager to create good-will between the two countries & played an important role in establishing good relations.

Baroda had produced many cricketers of international level in the past such as Vijay Hazare, Gogumal Kishenchand, Jayasinghrao Ghorpade, Deepak Shodhan & in the present generation Datta Gaekwad, Chandu Borde, Kiran More, Anshuman Gaekwad, Nayan Mongia, Jitendra Patel.

Currently, Irfan Pathan, Yusuf Pathan, and Zaheer Khan. There are also young players like Pinal Shah, Ajitesh Argal who are knocking the doors of International Cricket.

In January 2015, Memorandum of Understanding was signed between Government of Gujarat and Baroda Cricket Association for the stadium and will be located at Kotambi on the outskirts of Vadodara with the cost of Rs. 100 crores to develop 29 acres of land.

In January 2016, Memorandum of Understanding was signed between Reliance Industries Ltd and Baroda Cricket Association for leasing Reliance Stadium which will be renovated will have a capacity of 40,000 spectators as well as include facilities like floodlights, dressing room, swimming pool, gymnasium and other cricketing facilities. The ground will also be renamed after Dhirubhai Ambani as Dhirubhai Ambani Cricket Stadium.

== Tournament ==
- Maharani Shantadevi Coca-Cola Cup Inter School Under-16s Tournament
- Capt Vijay Hazare Under-16 Three-Day Tournament
- Baroda Under-16 Invitation Tournament
- Jaisinghrao Surve Under-19 One-Day Tournament
- Late Mamasaheb Ghorpade Under-19 Three-Day Tournament
- HH Maharaja Fatehsinghrao Gaekwad Two Day Tournament
- HD Zaveri Three Day Premier League
- Late Jaywant Lele Under-19 one-day all India Invitation Tournament

== Home ground ==
- Moti Bagh Stadium - Hosted three ODIs and now mostly used for Ranji Trophy matches
- Reliance Stadium - Hosted 10 ODIs since 1994 to 2010
- Baroda Cricket Association Stadium - Used since 2024. Hosted 01 Mens' ODI on 11 January 2026.

== International Umpire ==
- Sanjay Hazare
