= List of cricketers who have carried the bat in international cricket =

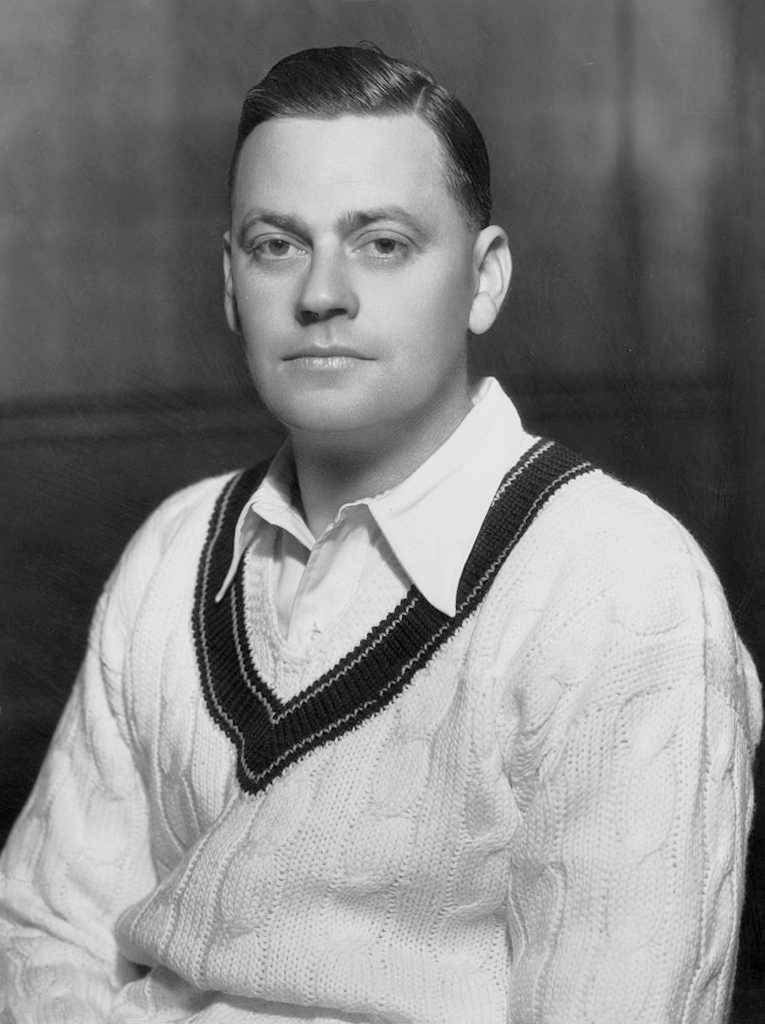
Australian opening batsman Bill Woodfull was the first cricketer to carry the bat two times in Test cricket.

In cricket, the phrase "carrying the bat" refers to a situation in which an opening batter remains not out at the end of an innings where all the 10 wickets have fallen; the other 10 players in the team have all been dismissed. It may also be used in situations where one or more of these players are unable to bat due to retiring out or causes like injury or illness, and the remaining players are dismissed. It is not used, however, in any other situation where the innings closes before all 10 wickets have fallen, such as when it is declared closed, or when the team successfully chases a set run target to win the match. A rare feat, this has happened only 75 times in international cricket spanning all three formats—Tests, One Day Internationals (ODIs) and Twenty20 Internationals (T20Is).

In Tests, South African Bernard Tancred was the first cricketer to carry the bat; he made 26 runs in his team's total of 47 against England in 1889. (Note: As of March 2018, this remains the lowest score by a batsman carrying the bat.) The following year, Jack Barrett of Australia became the first player to carry the bat on debut. In the 1892 tour of Australia, England's Bobby Abel scored 132 and became the first player to score a century while carrying the bat. In 1933, Bill Woodfull of Australia set a new record by becoming the first player to perform this feat twice in Tests; he scored 73 not out during the third test of England's 1933 tour. (Note: He previously carried the bat against England in 1928, scoring 30 runs.) Apart from Woodfull, five other cricketers have performed this feat more than once in their Test careers—while Bill Lawry (Australia), Glenn Turner (New Zealand) and Len Hutton (England) (Note: Hutton is the only player to make centuries on both the occasions.) have done it twice, Dean Elgar (South Africa) and Desmond Haynes (West Indies) have performed the feat on three occasions. As of January 2024, New Zealand's Tom Latham's 264, against Sri Lanka in December 2018, is the highest score in Test cricket by a player while carrying the bat. The Australian players have performed this feat more than any other, (Note: 12 players have carried their bats on 14 occasions) followed by England. In all, 49 players have carried their bats on 57 occasions in Test cricket. (Note: Out of the 57 occasions, 35 have resulted in a batsman scoring a century.)

In ODIs, there have been only 13 instances of a player carrying their bat. The first occasion was when Grant Flower made 84—in Zimbabwe's total of 205—against England in December 1994. The following year, Saeed Anwar became the first player to score an ODI century while carrying his bat; he made 103 against Zimbabwe in Harare. England's Nick Knight surpassed Anwar's score and went on to make 125 against Pakistan in 1996. As of September 2023, this remains a record in the ODI format. Australia's Damien Martyn and England's Alec Stewart are the only other players to score a century while performing this feat in ODIs. Sri Lanka's Upul Tharanga became the first cricketer from his team to carry the bat when he made 112 against Pakistan in October 2017.

In T20Is, Chris Gayle was the first player to carry his bat, doing so against Sri Lanka during the 2009 ICC World Twenty20, scoring 63 runs in West Indies' total of 101. As of now, only 5 players have achieved this feat in T20Is.

Flower became the first player to achieve this feat in two different international formats when he carried his bat in a Test match against Pakistan at Bulawayo in 1998. Since then, Anwar, Stewart, Javed Omar (Bangladesh), Gayle, Latham and Dimuth Karunaratne (Sri Lanka) have also managed this feat. (Note: Gayle has carried his bat in both in Tests and T20Is, while the others did so in Tests and ODIs.)

== Key ==
Key
Symbol	Meaning
Runs	Number of runs scored by the batsman
Total	Number of runs scored by the team
†	Not all 10 wickets fell in the innings
Inn	Innings in which the bat was carried
Date	Day on which the match was held
Result	Result for the team for which the bat was carried

== Tests ==
Tests
No.	Name	Runs	Total	Inn.	Team	Opposition	Venue	Date	Result	Ref(s)
1	Bernard Tancred	26*	47	2	South Africa	England	Newlands Cricket Ground, Cape Town, South Africa	25 March 1889	Lost	
2	Jack Barrett	67*	176	3	Australia	England	Lord's, London, England	21 July 1890	Lost	
3	Bobby Abel	132*	307	2	England	Australia	Sydney Cricket Ground, Sydney, Australia	29 January 1892	Lost	
4	Plum Warner	132*	237	3	England	South Africa	Old Wanderers, Johannesburg, South Africa	14 February 1899	Won	
5	Warwick Armstrong	159*	309	3	Australia	South Africa	Old Wanderers, Johannesburg, South Africa	18 October 1902	Won	
6	Billy Zulch	43*	103	2	South Africa	England	Newlands Cricket Ground, Cape Town, South Africa	11 March 1910	Lost	
7	Warren Bardsley	193*	383	1	Australia	England	Lord's, London, England	26 June 1926	Drawn	
8	Bill Woodfull (1/2)	30*	66 † (Note: Charles Kellaway and Jack Gregory were absent hurt.)	4	Australia	England	Brisbane Exhibition Ground, Brisbane, Australia	30 November 1928	Lost	
9	Bill Woodfull (2/2)	73*	193 † (Note: Bert Oldfield was absent hurt.)	4	Australia	England	Adelaide Oval, Adelaide, Australia	13 January 1933	Lost	
10	Bill Brown	206*	422	2	Australia	England	Lord's, London, England	24 June 1938	Drawn	
11	Len Hutton (1/2)	202*	344	2	England	West Indies	The Oval, London, England	12 August 1950	Lost	
12	Len Hutton (2/2)	156*	272	2	England	Australia	Adelaide Oval, Adelaide, Australia	2 February 1951	Lost	
13	Nazar Mohammad	124*	331	2	Pakistan	India	University Ground, Lucknow, India	23 October 1952	Won	
14	Frank Worrell	191*	372	2	West Indies	England	Trent Bridge, Nottingham, England	4 July 1957	Drawn	
15	Trevor Goddard	56*	99	3	South Africa	Australia	Newlands Cricket Ground, Cape Town, South Africa	31 December 1957	Lost	
16	Jackie McGlew	127*	292	1	South Africa	New Zealand	Kingsmead Cricket Ground, Durban, South Africa	8 December 1961	Won	
17	Conrad Hunte	60*	131	3	West Indies	Australia	Queen's Park Oval, Port of Spain, Trinidad and Tobago	14 May 1965	Lost	
18	Glenn Turner (1/2)	43*	131	4	New Zealand	England	Lord's, London, England	24 July 1969	Lost	
19	Bill Lawry (1/2)	49*	107	3	Australia	India	Feroz Shah Kotla Ground, Delhi, India	28 November 1969	Lost	
20	Bill Lawry (2/2)	60*	116 † (Note: Graham McKenzie was retired hurt.)	4	Australia	England	Sydney Cricket Ground, Sydney, Australia	9 January 1971	Lost	
21	Glenn Turner (2/2)	223*	386	2	New Zealand	West Indies	Sabina Park, Kingston, Jamaica	16 February 1972	Drawn	
22	Ian Redpath	159*	346	3	Australia	New Zealand	Eden Park, Auckland, New Zealand	22 March 1974	Won	
23	Geoffrey Boycott	99*	215	4	England	Australia	WACA Ground, Perth, Australia	14 December 1979	Lost	
24	Sunil Gavaskar	127*	286	3	India	Pakistan	Iqbal Stadium, Faisalabad, Pakistan	3 January 1983	Lost	
25	Mudassar Nazar	152*	323	1	Pakistan	India	Gaddafi Stadium, Lahore, Pakistan	23 January 1983	Drawn	
26	Sidath Wettimuny	63*	144	2	Sri Lanka	New Zealand	Lancaster Park, Christchurch, New Zealand	4 March 1983	Lost	
27	David Boon	58*	103	3	Australia	New Zealand	Eden Park, Auckland, New Zealand	13 March 1986	Lost	
28	Desmond Haynes (1/3)	88*	211	3	West Indies	Pakistan	National Stadium, Karachi, Pakistan	20 November 1986	Drawn	
29	Graham Gooch	154*	252	3	England	West Indies	Headingley, Leeds, England	6 June 1991	Won	
30	Desmond Haynes (2/3)	75*	176	2	West Indies	England	The Oval, London, England	8 August 1991	Lost	
31	Alec Stewart	69*	175	3	England	Pakistan	Lord's, London, England	18 June 1992	Lost	
32	Desmond Haynes (3/3)	143*	382	3	West Indies	Pakistan	Queen's Park Oval, Port of Spain, Trinidad and Tobago	16 April 1993	Won	
33	Mark Dekker	68*	187	4	Zimbabwe	Pakistan	Rawalpindi Cricket Stadium, Rawalpindi, Pakistan	9 December 1993	Lost	
34	Michael Atherton	94*	228	2	England	New Zealand	Lancaster Park, Christchurch, New Zealand	14 February 1997	Won	
35	Gary Kirsten	100*	239	1	South Africa	Pakistan	Iqbal Stadium, Faisalabad, Pakistan	24 October 1997	Won	
36	Mark Taylor	169*	350	2	Australia	South Africa	Adelaide Oval, Adelaide, Australia	30 January 1998	Drawn	
37	Grant Flower	156*	321	1	Zimbabwe	Pakistan	Queens Sports Club, Bulawayo, Zimbabwe	14 March 1998	Drawn	
38	Saeed Anwar	188*	316	3	Pakistan	India	Eden Gardens, Kolkata, India	16 February 1999	Won	
39	Marvan Atapattu	216*	428	2	Sri Lanka	Zimbabwe	Queens Sports Club, Bulawayo, Zimbabwe	18 November 1999	Drawn	
40	Russel Arnold	104*	231	2	Sri Lanka	Zimbabwe	Harare Sports Club, Harare, Zimbabwe	4 December 1999	Drawn	
41	Javed Omar	85*	168 † (Note: Khaled Mashud was absent hurt.)	3	Bangladesh	Zimbabwe	Queens Sports Club, Bulawayo, Zimbabwe	19 April 2001	Lost	
42	Virender Sehwag	201*	329	1	India	Sri Lanka	Galle International Stadium, Galle, Sri Lanka	31 July 2008	Won	
43	Simon Katich	131*	268	3	Australia	New Zealand	The Gabba, Brisbane, Australia	20 November 2008	Won	
44	Chris Gayle	165*	317	3	West Indies	Australia	Adelaide Oval, Adelaide, Australia	4 December 2009	Drawn	
45	Imran Farhat	117*	223	1	Pakistan	New Zealand	McLean Park, Napier, New Zealand	11 December 2009	Drawn	
46	Rahul Dravid	146*	300	2	India	England	The Oval, London, England	18 August 2011	Lost	
47	Tino Mawoyo	163*	412	1	Zimbabwe	Pakistan	Queens Sports Club, Bulawayo, Zimbabwe	1 September 2011	Lost	
48	David Warner	123*	233	4	Australia	New Zealand	Bellerive Oval, Hobart, Australia	9 December 2011	Lost	
49	Cheteshwar Pujara	145*	312	1	India	Sri Lanka	Sinhalese Sports Club Ground, Colombo, Sri Lanka	28 August 2015	Won	
50	Dean Elgar (1/3)	118*	214	2	South Africa	England	Kingsmead Cricket Ground, Durban, South Africa	26 December 2015	Lost	
51	Kraigg Brathwaite	142*	337	2	West Indies	Pakistan	Sharjah Cricket Stadium, Sharjah, United Arab Emirates	30 October 2016	Won	
52	Alastair Cook	244*	491	2	England	Australia	Melbourne Cricket Ground, Melbourne, Australia	26 December 2017	Drawn	
53	Dean Elgar (2/3)	86*	177	4	South Africa	India	New Wanderers Stadium, Johannesburg, South Africa	24 January 2018	Lost	
54	Dean Elgar (3/3)	141*	311	1	South Africa	Australia	Newlands Cricket Ground, Cape Town, South Africa	23 March 2018	Won	
55	Dimuth Karunaratne	158*	287	1	Sri Lanka	South Africa	Galle International Stadium, Galle, Sri Lanka	12 July 2018	Won	
56	Tom Latham	264*	578	2	New Zealand	Sri Lanka	Basin Reserve, Wellington, New Zealand	17 December 2018	Drawn	
57	Steve Smith	91*	207	4	Australia	West Indies	The Gabba, Brisbane, Australia	25 January 2024	Lost	

== ODIs ==
ODIs
No	Name	Runs	Total	Inn.	Team	Opposition	Venue	Date	Result	Ref(s)
1	Grant Flower	84*	205	1	Zimbabwe	England	Sydney Cricket Ground, Sydney, Australia	15 December 1994	Won	
2	Saeed Anwar	103*	219	2	Pakistan	Zimbabwe	Harare Sports Club, Harare, Zimbabwe	22 February 1995	Tied	
3	Nick Knight	125*	246	1	England	Pakistan	Trent Bridge, Nottingham, England	1 September 1996	Lost	
4	Ridley Jacobs	49*	110	1	West Indies	Australia	Old Trafford Cricket Ground, Manchester, England	30 May 1999	Lost	
5	Damien Martyn	116*	191	1	Australia	New Zealand	Eden Park, Auckland, New Zealand	3 March 2000	Lost	
6	Herschelle Gibbs	59*	101 † (Note: Gary Kirsten, Gibbs' opening partner, was retired hurt.)	2	South Africa	Pakistan	Sharjah Cricket Stadium, Sharjah, United Arab Emirates	28 March 2000	Lost	
7	Alec Stewart	100*	192	2	England	West Indies	Trent Bridge, Nottingham, England	20 July 2000	Lost	
8	Javed Omar	33*	103	2	Bangladesh	Zimbabwe	Harare Sports Club, Harare, Zimbabwe	8 April 2001	Lost	
9	Azhar Ali	81*	199	2	Pakistan	Sri Lanka	R. Premadasa Stadium, Colombo, Sri Lanka	16 June 2012	Lost	
10	Tom Latham	79*	190	1	New Zealand	India	HPCA Stadium, Dharamshala, India	16 October 2016	Lost	
11	Upul Tharanga	112*	187	2	Sri Lanka	Pakistan	Sheikh Zayed Stadium, Abu Dhabi, United Arab Emirates	16 October 2017	Lost	
12	Dimuth Karunaratne	52*	136	1	Sri Lanka	New Zealand	Sophia Gardens, Cardiff, Wales	1 June 2019	Lost	
13	Temba Bavuma	114*	222	1	South Africa	Australia	Mangaung Oval, Bloemfontein, South Africa	7 September 2023	Lost	

== T20Is ==
T20Is
No	Name	Runs	Total	Inn.	Team	Opposition	Venue	Date	Result	Ref(s)
1	Chris Gayle	63*	101	2	West Indies	Sri Lanka	The Oval, London, England	19 June 2009	Lost	
2	Richmond Baaleri	56*	115	2	Ghana	Botswana	Willowmoore Park, Benoni, South Africa	11 December 2023	Lost	
3	Litton Das	54*	105	2	Bangladesh	Afghanistan	Arnos Vale Stadium, Kingstown, Saint Vincent and the Grenadines	24 June 2024	Lost	
4	Festus Benn	32*	51	1	Bahamas	Bermuda	Jimmy Powell Oval, George Town, Cayman Islands	23 April 2025	Lost	
5	John Bangura	37*	95	1	Sierra Leone	Nigeria	Nigeria Cricket Federation Oval 1, Abuja, Nigeria	7 December 2025	Lost	
6	Billy Konstas	50*	96	1	Greece	Germany	Kerava National Cricket Ground, Kerava, Finland	18 August 2026	Lost	

== Women's Tests ==
Women's Tests
No	Name	Runs	Total	Inn.	Team	Opposition	Venue	Date	Result	Ref(s)
1	Cecilia Robinson	96*	188	3	England	Australia	WACA Ground, Perth	21 March 1958	Drawn	
2	Enid Bakewell	112*	164	3	England	West Indies	Edgbaston Cricket Ground, Birmingham	1 July 1979	Won	

== Women's ODIs ==
Women's ODIs
No	Name	Runs	Total	Inn.	Team	Opposition	Venue	Date	Result	Ref(s)
1	Lynne Thomas	70*	113	2	International XI	India	McLean Park, Napier	17 January 1982	Lost	
2	Debbie Hockley	78*	158	2	New Zealand	Australia	Eden Park, Auckland	16 February 1997	Lost	
3	Purnima Rau	67*	117	1	India	New Zealand	Bert Sutcliffe Oval, Lincoln	20 December 2000	Lost	
4	Cecelia Joyce	43*	107	1	Ireland	South Africa	Stellenbosch University Ground, Stellenbosch	22 February 2008	Lost	
