= 1952–53 Ranji Trophy =

Indian cricket tournament

- The Ranji Trophy
- Administrator: BCCI
- Cricket format: First-class
- Tournament format: Knockout
- Champions: Holkar (4th title)
- Participants: 20
- Most runs: Bhausaheb Nimbalkar (Holkar) (474)
- Most wickets: Montu Banerjee (Bengal) (26)

The 1952–53 Ranji Trophy was the 19th season of the Ranji Trophy. Holkar won the title defeating Bengal in the final.

== Highlights ==
- Kerala, as Travancore-Cochin, made its first appearance

== Zonal Matches ==
=== South Zone ===
Round 1
8 Nov 1952 – Trivandrum
Travancore-Cochin	86 & 86
Mysore	220
5 Dec 1952 – Madras
Madras (T)	161
Hyderabad	80/1

Round 2
27 Dec 1952 – Bangalore
Mysore	299 & 211/1
Madras	291 & 218

(T) – Advanced to next round by spin of coin.

=== North Zone ===
Round 1
15 Nov 1952 – Jullundur
Eastern Punjab	274 & 293/8d
Delhi	393 & 177/3

Round 2
25 Dec 1952 – New Delhi
Delhi	94 & 453/7
Services	567

=== West Zone ===
Round 1
21 Nov 1952 – Baroda
Baroda	246 & 277/3
Gujarat	364 & 451/4d

Round 2
14 Feb 1953 – Rajkot
Saurashtra	91 & 93
Gujarat	273
18 Dec 1952 – Sholapur
Maharashtra	167 & 271
Bombay	112 & 307

Round 3
28 Feb 1953 – Ahmedbad
Gujarat	202 & 234
Maharashtra	260 & 178/2

=== East Zone ===
Round 1
6 Dec 1952 – Cuttack
Orissa	303
Assam	74 & 90
3 Jan 1953 – Calcutta
Bengal	323 & 354/5d
Bihar	235 & 140/7

Round 2
17 Jan 1953 – Cuttack
Orissa	126 & 258
Bengal	301 & 85/3

=== Central Zone ===
Round 1
6 Dec 1952 – Ratlam
Holkar	285 & 11/0
Rajputana	148 & 143
19 Dec 1952 – Nagpur
Madhya Pradesh	350 & 167
Uttar Pradesh	274 & 285

Round 2
17 Jan 1953 – Indore
Holkar	464
Uttar Pradesh	85 & 53

== Inter-Zonal Knockout matches ==
Quarter-finals
13 Feb 1953 – Calcutta
Bengal	191 & 356
Services	107 & 183

Semi-finals
26 Feb 1953 – Calcutta
Bengal	358 & 110
Mysore	198 & 166
12 Mar 1953 – Indore
Holkar	469 & 235/3
Maharashtra	331 & 369

Final
20 Mar 1953 – Calcutta
Bengal	479 & 320/5d
Holkar	496 & 177/9

=== Final ===
20–24 March 1953
Scorecard

Bengal (H)	v	Holkar
479 (198.4 overs); P. B. Datta 141; Hiralal Gaekwad 4/128		496 (171.1 overs); B. B. Nimbalkar 219; S. K. Shome 4/195
320 for 5 decl (44.5 overs); Benjamin Frank 62; Arjun Naidu 2/73		177/9 (105 overs); Mushtaq Ali 46; S. K. Girdhari 3/17

Holkar won on first innings lead
Eden Gardens, Calcutta
Umpires: Santosh Ganguli and M. G. Vijayasarathi

- Bengal won the toss and decided to bat

== Scorecards and averages ==
- CricketArchive
- ESPNcricinfo
