= L. T. Adisesh =

Indian cricketer (1927–2016)

Personal information
- Full name: Linganatha Thammiam Adisesh
- Born: 11 May 1927
- Died: 19 November 2016 (aged 89); Liverpool, England
- Role: All-rounder
- Relatives: L. T. Subbu (brother)

Domestic team information
- Years: Team
- 1947/48–1955/56: Mysore
- 1951/52–1952/53: South Zone

Career statistics
Competition	First-class
Matches	18
Runs scored	990
Batting average	38.07
100s/50s	1/6
Top score	183
Balls bowled	1824
Wickets	23
Bowling average	29.78
5 wickets in innings	0
10 wickets in match	0
Best bowling	4/33
Catches/stumpings	10/–
- Source: Cricinfo, 29 March 2024

Linganatha Thammiam Adisesh, usually known as L. T. Adisesh (11 May 1927 – 19 November 2016), was an Indian cricketer who played first-class cricket from 1947 to 1956. He became a doctor and practised in England.

Adisesh was a middle-order batsman and all-rounder. While studying medicine at the University of Mysore he represented the university in the Rohinton Baria Trophy, scoring 185 when Mysore won the final in 1950–51. He played in the Ranji Trophy for Mysore from 1947 to 1956, and also played for South Zone in first-class matches against international touring teams.

In 1951–52 Adisesh had his most successful match, scoring 70 and 183 and taking 4 for 33 in the first innings when Mysore defeated Hyderabad by 422 runs in the Ranji Trophy. A few weeks later he top-scored for South Zone against the touring MCC, scoring 69 and 29.

In 1952–53 Adisesh again top-scored for South Zone, this time against the touring Pakistan team, scoring 87. Shortly afterwards, he was selected to tour the West Indies in 1952–53 with the Indian Test team, but was one of several selected players from South Zone who made themselves unavailable in protest at what they believed was a West Zone bias among the selectors.

Adisesh continued his medical studies in England. He played league cricket in northern England, including a spell with Liverpool in the Liverpool and District Cricket Competition from 1966 to 1973. He practised medicine in Liverpool, and died at home there in November 2016, aged 89.
