= Narayan Sane =

Indian cricket umpire (1909–2002)

Personal information
- Full name: Narayan Dattatraya Sane
- Born: 4 February 1909; Chikhalgaon, India
- Died: 10 April 2002 (aged 93); Nagpur, India
- Relatives: Wasuderao Sane (brother)

Umpiring information
- Tests umpired: 2 (1960)
- Source: ESPNcricinfo, 15 July 2013

Narayan Sane (4 February 1909 – 10 April 2002) was an Indian cricket umpire. He stood in two Test matches in 1960. Sane was also a first-class cricketer between 1934 and 1949. He made one appearance for Maharashtra then played seven matches for Central Provinces and Berar.

== See also ==
- List of Test cricket umpires
- Australian cricket team in India in 1959–60
