= Frank King (West Indian cricketer) =

West Indian cricketer

Cricket information
- Batting: Right-handed
- Bowling: Right-arm fast

International information
- National side: West Indies
- Test debut (cap 75): 21 January 1953 v India
- Last Test: 3 March 1956 v New Zealand

Domestic team information
- Years: Team
- 1947/48–1949/50: Barbados
- 1950/51: Trinidad
- 1951/52–1956/57: Barbados

Career statistics
Competition	Test	First-class
Matches	14	31
Runs scored	116	237
Batting average	8.28	9.11
100s/50s	0/0	0/0
Top score	21	30*
Balls bowled	2,869	5,681
Wickets	29	90
Bowling average	39.96	28.75
5 wickets in innings	1	2
10 wickets in match	0	0
Best bowling	5/74	5/35
Catches/stumpings	5/–	17/–
- Source: CricInfo, 14 January 2020

Frank McDonald King (14 December 1926 – 23 December 1990) was a West Indian cricketer who played in 14 Test matches between 1953 and 1956.

Born in Delamere Land, Brighton, St Michael, Barbados, King was a hostile right-arm fast bowler who opened the bowling for the West Indies in three consecutive home series in the early 1950s. But he failed to build on a promising debut in the 1952–53 series against the Indian cricket team, when, with 17 wickets, he was the second highest wicket-taker after Alf Valentine. In the third Test of the series, he took 5 for 74 in India's first innings, and also broke the hand of the Indian wicketkeeper, Ebrahim Maka. The report of the tour in Wisden, however, says that he "used the bumper a little too often for it to be a surprise ball".

The following season he played three Tests against England and took eight wickets, again bowling with much hostility and inflicting injury to several batsmen, though he himself also suffered from muscle strains. In 1954–55 he took just three wickets in four Tests against the Australians; he made his highest Test score of 21 in the second innings of the First Test, which prevented an innings defeat.

His one overseas tour, to New Zealand in 1955–56, was blighted by injury. In the first Test, he pulled up with a strained muscle at the start of his ninth over; returning for the third Test, he again was injured, this time after four balls of his ninth over. This tour saw the emergence of Tom Dewdney as a fast bowler, and King never again appeared for the West Indies.

When he was passed over for the 1957 West Indies tour to England, King retired from first-class cricket and moved to England where he played league cricket for West Bromwich Dartmouth in the Birmingham League.

King played for Barbados from 1947–48 to 1956–57, except for 1950–51, when he played two matches for Trinidad against Barbados. His best bowling figures were 5 for 35 against Jamaica in 1951–52.

He died in England at Bescot, Walsall in 1990 aged 64.
