= Ebrahim Maka =

Indian cricketer

Personal information
- Full name: Ebrahim Suleman Maka
- Born: 5 March 1922; Daman, Portuguese India
- Died: 7 November 1994 (aged 72); Daman, Gujarat, India
- Batting: Right-handed
- Role: Wicket-keeper

International information
- National side: India
- Test debut (cap 67): 28 November 1952 v Pakistan
- Last Test: 19 February 1953 v West Indies

Career statistics
Competition	Test	First-class
Matches	2	34
Runs scored	2	607
Batting average	–	15.56
100s/50s	0/0	0/2
Top score	2*	66*
Catches/stumpings	2/1	58/27
- Source: CricketArchive, 30 October 2022

Ebrahim Suleman Maka (5 March 1922 – 7 November 1994) was an Indian cricketer. A wicket-keeper, he represented India in two Test matches in the 1952–53 season. He was born in Daman, at the time part of Portuguese India.

== Career ==
Maka's first-class cricket career extended from the 1941–42 season until 1962–63. He appeared at a time when Indian cricket had many wicket-keepers of similar class. His first appearance was in the fourth Test against Pakistan in 1952–53. The selectors had already tried out Probir Sen, Nana Joshi and Vijay Rajindernath as wicket-keepers in the previous Tests, and Maka himself was replaced by Sen for the fifth Test.

His other Test was in the West Indies later in the same season when he was understudy to Joshi. While batting he had two bones of his right hand broken by a ball delivered by fast bowler Frank King, and took no further part in the tour.

Maka came from a poor family. His father was a cargo ship captain who earned Rs.150 a month and had to take care of a family of ten who lived near Crawford Market in Bombay.
