= Jack Barrett (cricketer) =

Australian cricketer, footballer and doctor (1866–1916)

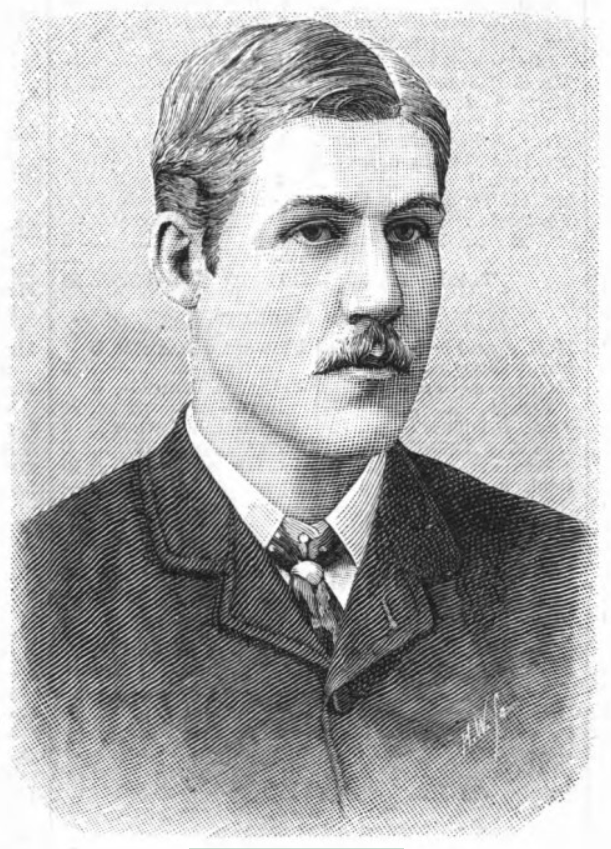
- Portrait of Jack Barrett in 1890

Personal information
- Full name: John Edward Barrett
- Born: 15 October 1866; South Melbourne, Victoria, Australia
- Died: 6 February 1916 (aged 49); Peak Hill, Western Australia
- Height: 6 ft 1 in (1.85 m)
- Batting: Left-handed
- Bowling: Right-arm medium
- Relatives: Edgar Barrett (brother)

International information
- National side: Australia
- Test debut (cap 55): 21 July 1890 v England
- Last Test: 11 August 1890 v England

Domestic team information
- Years: Team
- 1884/85–1892/93: Victoria

Career statistics
Competition	Tests	First-class
Matches	2	50
Runs scored	80	2039
Batting average	26.66	25.81
100s/50s	0/1	0/13
Top score	67*	97
Balls bowled	0	965
Wickets	0	21
Bowling average	–	16.00
5 wickets in innings	0	3
10 wickets in match	0	1
Best bowling	–	6/49
Catches/stumpings	1/0	16/0
- Source: Cricinfo, 9 February 2025

John Edward Barrett (15 October 1866 – 6 February 1916) was an Australian cricketer who played two Tests in 1890. He played first-class cricket for Victoria from 1884–85 to 1892–93 before retiring from cricket to concentrate on his work as a medical doctor.

== Life and career ==
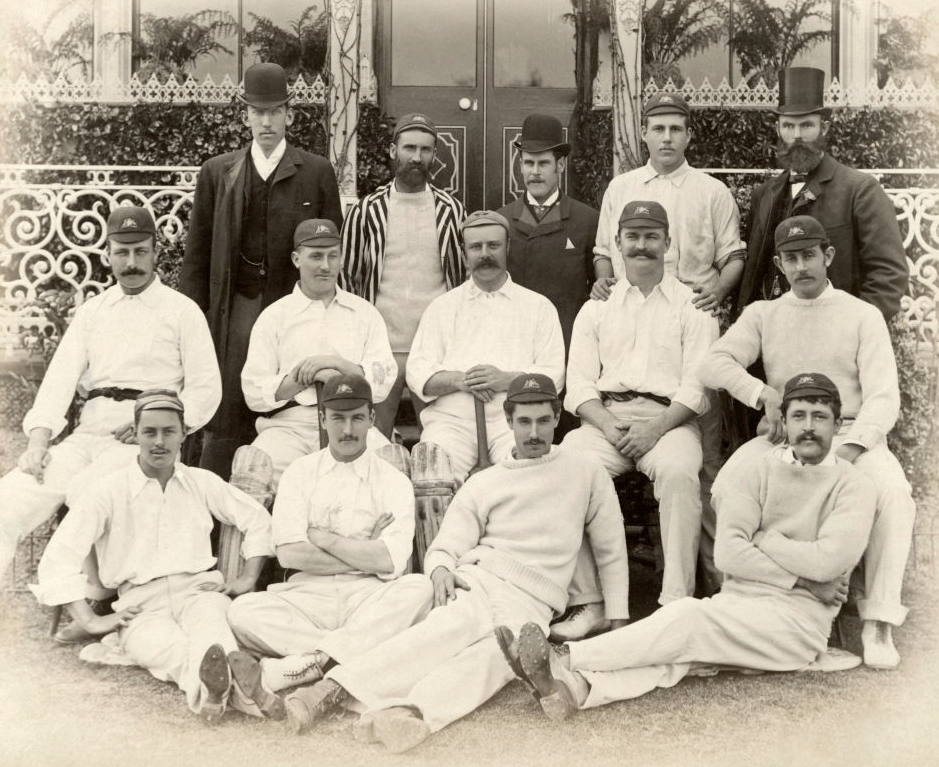
Barrett pictured 2nd right back row with the 1890 Australian team.

Barrett was born in South Melbourne and educated nearby at Wesley College before going on to Melbourne University to study medicine. His father was a doctor in South Melbourne, and his older brother was also a doctor.

A careful batsman, reliable in a crisis, Jack Barrett played first-class cricket for Victoria from 1885 to 1893. Despite having missed many of Victoria's matches owing to his medical studies, he was selected to tour England in 1890 with the Australian team.

On his Test debut, in the first Test of the series at Lord's, Barrett became the first Australian batsman to carry his bat in Test cricket. In the second innings he opened the innings and batted for 280 minutes and scored 67 not out of a team total of 176. On the tour as a whole he was second in the Australian batting averages with 1305 runs at 22.89. According to A. G. Moyes, he "did a splendid job, showing unlimited patience and splendid defence, though he lacked grace and charm in technique to relieve the monotony". He made his highest first-class score of 97 (and 73 not out in the second innings) in the final match of the tour against an England XI at Manchester.

Barrett undertook further medical studies in England after the cricket tour, earning an MRCS diploma in surgery. He retired from cricket at the age of 26 to pursue his medical career. At the time of his death in the goldfields town of Peak Hill, Western Australia, he had been practising there for some years.
