= Shah Nyalchand =

Indian cricketer

Personal information
- Full name: Nyalchand Sukhlal Shah
- Born: 14 September 1915; Dhrangadhra, British India
- Died: 3 January 1997 (aged 81); Junagadh, Gujarat, India
- Batting: Left-handed
- Bowling: Left-arm medium

International information
- National side: India
- Only Test (cap 63): 23 October 1952 v Pakistan

Career statistics
| Competition | Test | First-class |
|---|---|---|
| Matches | 1 | 57 |
| Runs scored | 7 | 420 |
| Batting average | 7.00 | 7/63 |
| 100s/50s | 0/0 | 0/0 |
| Top score | 6* | 33 |
| Balls bowled | 387 | 14,419 |
| Wickets | 3 | 235 |
| Bowling average | 32.33 | 22.57 |
| 5 wickets in innings | 0 | 15 |
| 10 wickets in match | 0 | 6 |
| Best bowling | 3/97 | 7/32 |
| Catches/stumpings | 0/– | 18/– |
- Source: CricketArchive, 9 September 2022

Shah Nyalchand (14 September 1915 – 3 January 1997) was an Indian Test cricketer.

Nyalchand was a left arm medium pace bowler who was particularly effective on matting wickets. His only Test match was against Pakistan at Lucknow in 1952/53, which was one of only two occasions that a matting wicket was used for a Test in India. He returned figures of 3 for 97. Frank Worrell once described Nyalchand as the 'king of matting wickets'.

Nyalchand played 24 seasons of Ranji Trophy, half of which were for Saurashtra. He captained Saurashtra for three seasons. His most successful season was 1961/62 when he took 27 wickets, including a split hat-trick against Maharashtra. During this purple patch, he took ten wickets in three consecutive matches across two seasons. Apart from the Test, he appeared a few times for zonal sides against visiting teams. He toured East Africa with the Sundar Cricket Club of Bombay in 1957.

Nyalchand was schooled in Sir Ajitsinhji High School in Dhrangadhra. He worked as a draughtsman with the Public Works Department of Gujarat government at Rajkot. He did cricket coaching for a time and was the recipient of an aid from the benefit fund of BCCI. His death was from a massive heart attack.
