= Indian cricket team in the West Indies in 1952–53 =

International cricket tour

Indian cricket team in West Indies in 1952–53
- Date: 10 January – 4 April 1953
- Location: (Cricket West Indies) West Indies
- Result: West Indies won 5-Test series 1–0
Teams
- West Indies: India
Captains
- Jeffrey Stollmeyer: Vijay Hazare
Most runs
- Everton Weekes (716) Clyde Walcott (457) Frank Worrell (398): Polly Umrigar (560); Madhav Apte (460); Pankaj Roy (383)
Most wickets
- Alf Valentine (28) Frank King (17) Sonny Ramadhin (13): Subhash Gupte (27); Vinoo Mankad (15); Dattu Phadkar (9)

The India national cricket team toured the West Indies during the 1952–53 cricket season. They played five Test matches against the West Indian cricket team, with the West Indies winning the series 1–0. India also played five other first-class matches, one of which resulted in India's victory. The tour was the first of the Caribbean by a national team other than England.

== Touring party ==
Vijay Hazare was named India's captain for the tour on 24 November 1952 and was included in the selection panel. The touring party was announced on 6 December. Five of the selected players withdrew before the tour began. Probir Sen was replaced by Ebrahim Maka and C. D. Gopinath, who broke his collar bone, by Mysore cricketer L. Adiseth, who also withdrew later. Gopalaswamy Kasturirangan, who had a groin injury, was replaced by N. Kannayiram. Ghulam Ahmed turned down the tour in order to get married on 26 December, three days after the team flew from India. He was initially not replaced as the Board of Control for Cricket in India believed he could be convinced to fly to the Caribbean after his wedding. However, he declined to do so as his wedding had already been postponed once because of a relative's illness. Subsequently, leg-spinner Jayasinghrao Ghorpade was called in.

The final touring party was:

- Vijay Hazare, captain
- Vinoo Mankad, vice-captain
- Madhav Apte
- Chandrasekhar Gadkari
- Datta Gaekwad
- Jayasinghrao Ghorpade
- Subhash Gupte
- Nana Joshi
- N. Kannayiram
- Ebrahim Maka
- Vijay Manjrekar
- Dattu Phadkar
- Gulabrai Ramchand
- Pankaj Roy
- Deepak Shodhan
- Polly Umrigar

== Test matches ==
=== 1st Test ===
21–28 January 1953 (6-day match)
Scorecard

India	v	West Indies
417 (192.1 overs); Polly Umrigar 130; Gerry Gomez 3/84 (42 overs)		438 (182 overs); Everton Weekes 207; Subhash Gupte 7/162 (66 overs)
294 (143.5 overs); Polly Umrigar 69; Sonny Ramadhin 3/58 (24.5 overs)		142/0 (55 overs); Jeffrey Stollmeyer 76; Subhash Gupte 0/2 (2 overs)

Match drawn
Queen's Park Oval, Port of Spain
Umpires: Carlton John and Eric Lee Kow

- India won the toss and decided to bat
- Chandrasekhar Gadkari (Ind) and Alfred Binns, Bruce Pairaudeau and Frank King (all WI) made their debut in Test matches.
- 25 and 26 January were rest days.

=== 2nd Test ===
7–12 February 1953 (6-day match)
Scorecard

West Indies	v	India
296 (116.4 overs); Clyde Walcott 98; Subhash Gupte 3/99 (41 overs)		253 (134 overs); Madhav Apte 64; Alfred Valentine 4/58 (41 overs)
228 (90.3 overs); Jeffrey Stollmeyer 54; Dattu Phadkar 5/64 (29.3 overs)		129 (79.5 overs); Gulabrai Ramchand 34; Sonny Ramadhin 5/26 (24.5 overs)

West Indies won by 142 runs
Kensington Oval, Bridgetown
Umpires: Cortez Jordan and Harold Walcott

- West Indies won the toss and decided to bat

=== 3rd Test ===
19–25 February 1953 (6-day match)
Scorecard

India	v	West Indies
279 (131.2 overs); Gulabrai Ramchand 62; Frank King 5/74 (31 overs)		315 (146 overs); Everton Weekes 161; Subhash Gupte 5/107 (48 overs)
362/7d (200.1 overs); Madhav Apte 163; Frank Worrell 2/62 (31 overs)		192/2 (54 overs); Jeffrey Stollmeyer 104; Subhash Gupte 1/19 (7 overs)

Match drawn
Queen's Park Oval, Port of Spain
Umpires: Carlton John and Eric Lee Kow

- India won the toss and decided to bat

=== 4th Test ===
11–17 March 1953 (6-day match)
Scorecard

India	v	West Indies
262 (124.5 overs); Vinoo Mankad 66; Alfred Valentine 5/127 (53.5 overs)		364 (156.2 overs); Clyde Walcott 125; Subhash Gupte 4/122 (56.2 overs)
190/5 (98 overs); Pankaj Roy 48; Alfred Valentine 3/71 (34 overs)

Match drawn
Bourda, Georgetown
Umpires: Wing Gillette and Toby Rollox

- India won the toss and decided to bat

=== 5th Test ===
28 Mar − 4 Apr 1953 (6-day match)
Scorecard

India	v	West Indies
312 (141.5 overs); Polly Umrigar 117; Alfred Valentine 5/64 (27.5 overs)		576 (206.1 overs); Frank Worrell 237; Subhash Gupte 5/180 (65.1 overs)
444 (178 overs); Pankaj Roy 150; Gerry Gomez 4/72 (47 overs)		92/4 (47 overs); Everton Weekes 36; Gulabrai Ramchand 2/33 (15 overs)

Match drawn
Sabina Park, Kingston
Umpires: Sam Burke and Tom Ewart

- India won the toss and decided to bat
