= Dimuth Karunaratne =

Sri Lankan cricketer (born 1988)

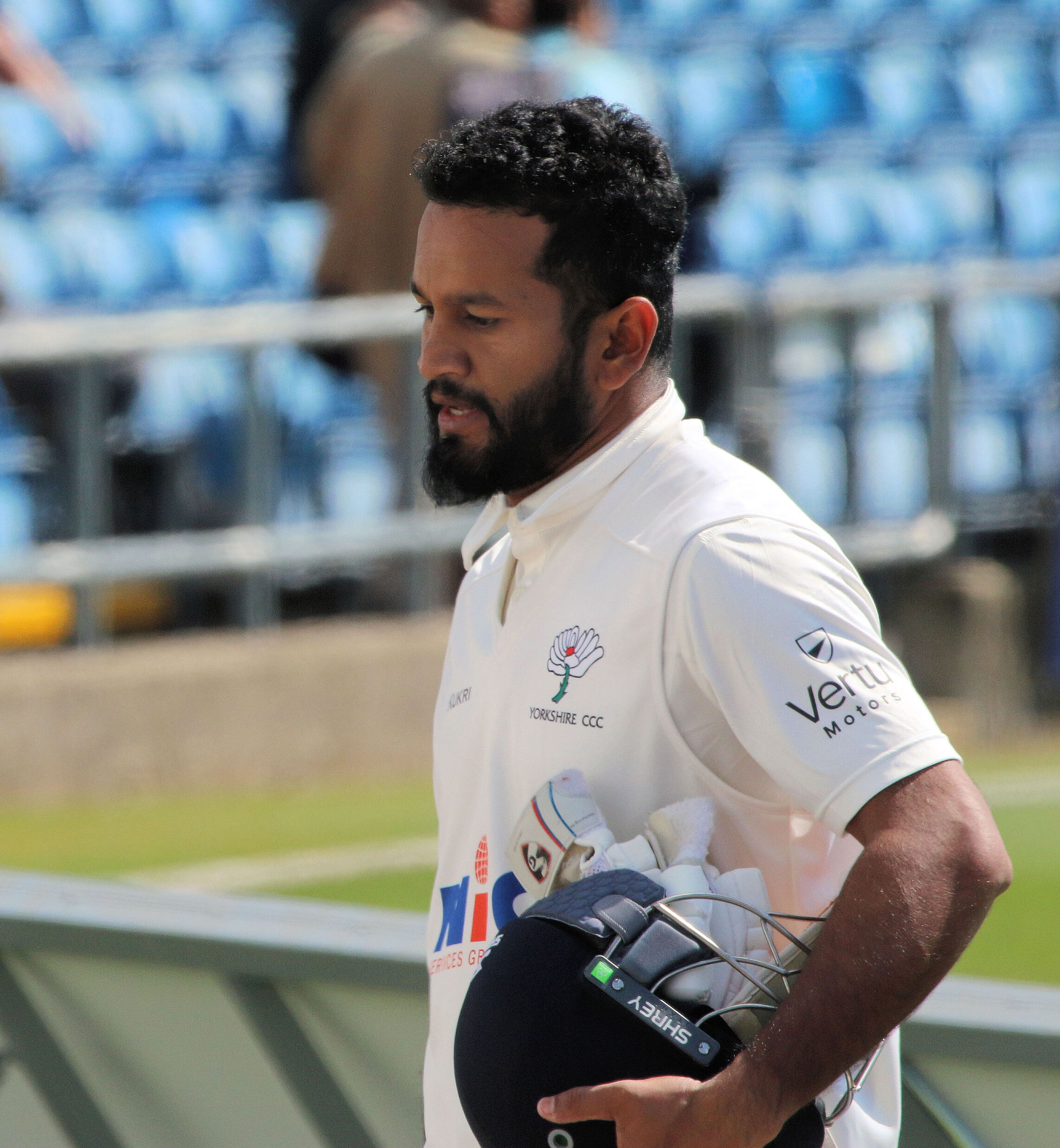
- Karunaratne in 2022

Personal information
- Full name: Frank Dimuth Madushanka Karunaratne
- Born: 21 April 1988 (age 38); Colombo, Sri Lanka
- Height: 6 ft 0 in (1.83 m)
- Batting: Left-handed
- Bowling: Right-arm medium; Right-arm off break
- Role: Opening batter

International information
- National side: Sri Lanka (2011–2025)
- Test debut (cap 123): 17 November 2012 v New Zealand
- Last Test: 6 February 2025 v Australia
- ODI debut (cap 146): 9 July 2011 v England
- Last ODI: 2 November 2023 v India

Domestic team information
- Years: Team
- 2008–2025: Sinhalese Sports Club
- 2009: Basnahira North
- 2010: Wayamba
- 2022: Yorkshire

Career statistics
Competition	Test	ODI	FC	LA
Matches	100	50	218	169
Runs scored	7,222	1,316	15,871	5,187
Batting average	39.25	31.33	44.83	35.52
100s/50s	16/39	1/11	47/73	7/34
Top score	244	103	244	132
Balls bowled	312	16	844	84
Wickets	2	0	4	3
Bowling average	101.00	–	128.35	21.33
5 wickets in innings	0	–	0	0
10 wickets in match	0	–	0	0
Best bowling	1/12	–	1/6	2/13
Catches/stumpings	62/–	17/–	187/1	74/–
- Source: ESPNcricinfo, 29 March 2025

Frank Dimuth Madushanka Karunaratne (born 21 April 1988; Sinhala: ෆ්‍රෑන්ක් දිමුත් මදුෂංක කරුණාරත්න), popularly known as Dimuth Karunaratne, is a Sri Lankan former professional cricketer and former captain of Test and ODI team of Sri Lanka. Regarded as one of the best Test openers in the world, he has been included 3 times in the ICC Test Cricket Team of the Year. He played as an opening batter for Sri Lanka in Test cricket and ODIs. He played first-class cricket for the Sinhalese Sports Club.

From 2015, Karunaratne was the leading batsman for Sri Lanka in Tests due to his century making in the second innings of Test matches. He was described as a second-innings specialist by many commentators. He scored four centuries in the second innings out of the six centuries he made until October 2017. On 7 October 2017, Karunaratne became the second Sri Lankan opener after Tillakaratne Dilshan to score three Test centuries in a calendar year. In February 2019, he was named as the captain of Sri Lanka's Test squad for their series against South Africa.

In April 2019, Sri Lanka Cricket named Dimuth Karunaratne as the team's new One Day International captain ahead of the 2019 Cricket World Cup, replacing Lasith Malinga. He is the only batsman after Ridley Jacobs to carry his bat in a Cricket World Cup. He announced his retirement from Test Cricket after the 100th test match of his career in the home series against Australia.

== Personal life and domestic career ==
Karunaratne attended the St Joseph's College Colombo, which has produced a number of Sri Lankan Test cricketers such as Angelo Mathews and Chaminda Vaas. He was a record-breaking batsman for the school's cricket team. After featuring in Sri Lanka's Under-19 and A squads, he was called into the senior One Day International (ODI) team for the series against England and Scotland in June and July 2011. He played in two matches on the tour, scoring four runs against England in Manchester, and 60 against Scotland in Edinburgh. He was selected in Sri Lanka's Test squad for its tour of South Africa at the end of 2011, although did not play in any of the three Tests.

In March 2018, Karunaratne was named as the captain of Dambulla's squad for the 2017–18 Super Four Provincial Tournament. The following month, he was also named in Dambulla's squad for the 2018 Super Provincial One Day Tournament.

In August 2018, Karunaratne was named as the vice-captain of Galle's squad the 2018 SLC T20 League.

In February 2019, Karunaratne signed for Hampshire County Cricket Club as their overseas player for the first half of the 2019 season.

On 25 March 2021, during National Super Provincial 4-Day Tournament, Karunaratne scored his 44th First Class Century. He scored unbeaten 125 hitting 15 boundaries and one six. His knock helped to chase down 218 run target and guide towards an eight wicket victory for the Colombo team.

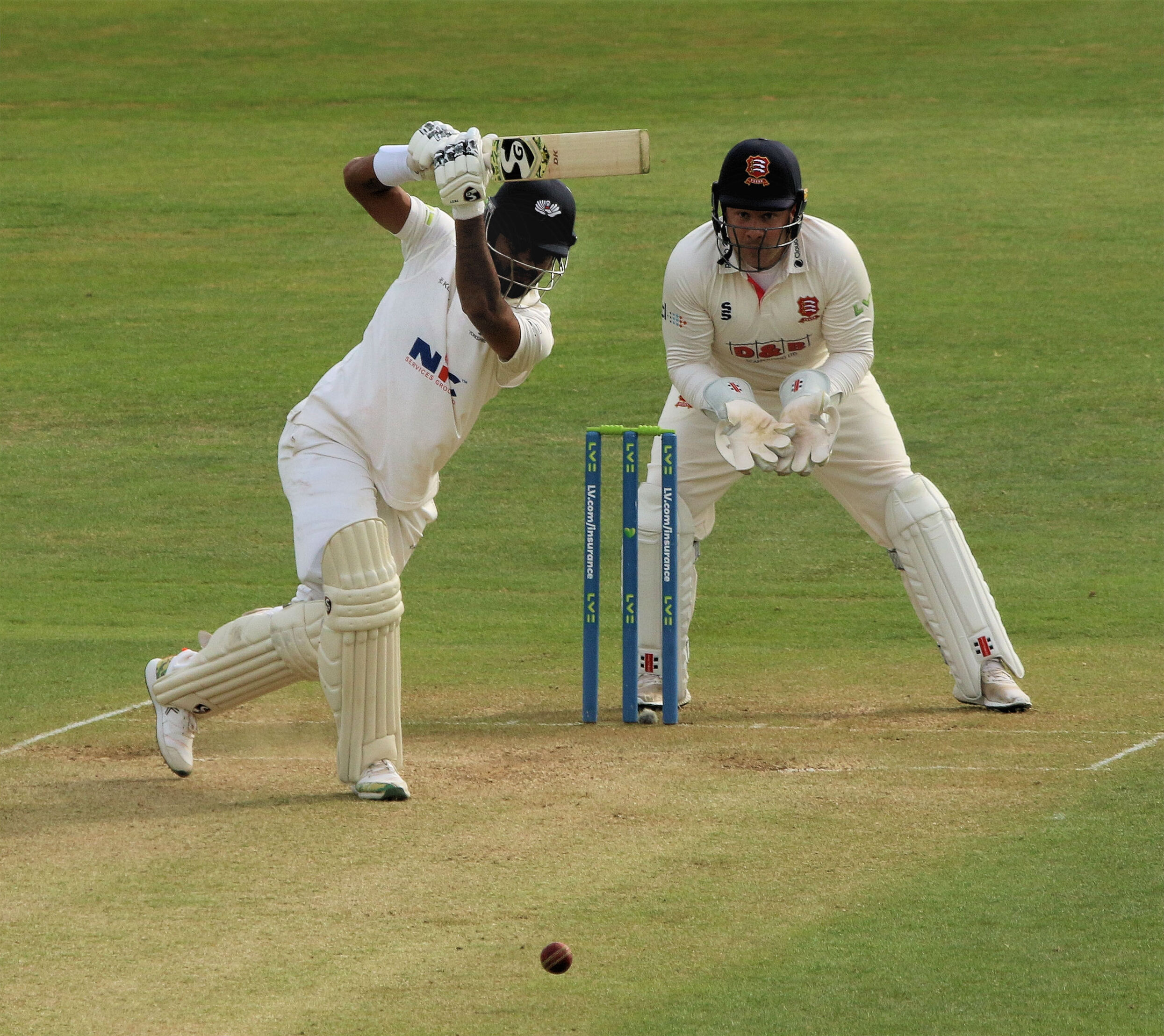
Karunaratne batting for Yorkshire in 2022

In April 2022, Karunaratne was signed by Yorkshire County Cricket Club to play in three matches in the 2022 County Championship in England.

== International career ==
=== Early days ===
Karunaratne was called up into the Test squad for the home Tests against New Zealand during late 2012. He got the opportunity due to Tillakaratne Dilshan being unable to make the XI because of an injury. He debuted in the first Test of the series at Galle, only to get out for a duck in the first innings. However, he came back strongly in the second innings with an unbeaten half century as well as hitting the winning runs.

Following the New Zealand series, Karunaratne was called into the Test squad which was to tour Australia for a series of three Test matches. During the first two Tests, he failed to have an impact as he struggled against the Australian pace attack. In the final Test of the series held in Sydney Karunaratne managed to hit his highest test score of 85 in the second innings.

His maiden Test century came against New Zealand on 28 December 2014 at Hagley Oval, Christchurch. He scored 152 runs from 363 balls in the second match of the series, when Sri Lanka were in deep trouble. Despite his century, Sri Lanka went on to lose the match.

Karunaratne was picked in the original squad for 2015 ICC Cricket World Cup, but during a practice match against England, he broke a bone in his right hand and was removed from the team after the match. He was replaced by Kusal Perera.

His second Test hundred came against Pakistan in Pallekele; he scored 133 runs in the first innings of the third match of the series. Just as Dimuth's first Test century was in a losing cause, his second proved to be the same: Sri Lanka lost the match by 7 wickets.

=== Consistent opener ===
His highest score in Test cricket was recorded during the first Test against West Indies in 2015 at Galle. Dimuth scored 186 runs before being dismissed by the bowling of Marlon Samuels. Alongside Dinesh Chandimal (who also scored a century), he recorded the highest partnership for the third wicket at Galle by helping score 238 runs. Sri Lanka easily defeated the West Indies by an innings and 5 runs.

Karunaratne showed poor performances at home against Australia. He was dismissed by Mitchell Starc in the first over of each innings. He scored just 41 runs in three matches, including five single-digit scores, for an average of 6.83 in six innings. Despite his poor performance, Sri Lanka whitewashed Australia 3–0 for the first time.

Karunaratne was named captain of Sri Lanka A for the first two four-day games at home against West Indies A. He scored 131 in first innings and 39* in second innings, guiding Sri Lanka A to a seven-wicket win. This strong comeback gave cause for Karunaratne to be named to the Test team for the Zimbabwe tour in late October 2016.

=== Permanent opener in Tests ===
During the first innings of the first Test against Zimbabwe, Karunaratne scored a fifty, and during the second innings scored his fourth Test century. Sri Lanka won the match by 225 runs. In the second Test, he scored 88 runs in the second innings. With impressive bowling by skipper Rangana Herath, Sri Lanka won the match by 257 runs, and whitewashed the series 2–0. Karunaratne won player of the series for his batting performance, scoring 280 runs at an average of 70.00.

Karunaratne took his maiden Test wicket by dismissing Indian batsman Cheteshwar Pujara during the second Test against India at SSC. In the second innings of the same match, he scored his fifth Test century during a century partnership with Kusal Mendis. However, his century could not force a result for Sri Lanka, as they lost the match by an innings and 53 runs. This was the first time that India won a test match by an innings against Sri Lanka in Sri Lanka. Sri Lanka lost all three matches against India in that series.

Sri Lanka played their first day-night Test on 6 October 2017 at the Dubai International Cricket Stadium against Pakistan. Karunatane scored a mighty innings of 196 and Sri Lanka posted 482 in their first innings. With his innings, Karunaratne became the first Sri Lankan to score 50, 100 and 150 in a day-night Test. He fell just short 4 runs away from a maiden double century, after he poked at a short delivery that came back slightly off the seam and the ball took his inside edge, hit his thigh pad, and clattered into his stumps. However, in the second innings, Sri Lanka were all out for just 96 runs. With the help of the bowling unit, Sri Lanka won the match by 68 runs after a thrilling finish on the fifth day. For his batting performances throughout the series, Karunaratne was adjudged both player of the match for the second Test and player of series.

During the first innings of second Test against India, Karunaratne completed 1000 Test run in a year 2017 with the average of 42.41. He was the second batsman to get to 1000 Test runs in 2017, after South African opener Dean Elgar. He was the seventh Sri Lankan to score 1000 Test runs in a calendar year as well.

In May 2018, Karunaratne was one of 33 cricketers to be awarded a national contract by Sri Lanka Cricket ahead of the 2018–19 season.

On 12 July 2018, during first test against South Africa, Karunaratne played his 50th test match. He celebrated the match with a magnificent century. He scored unbeaten 158 runs, and became the fourth batsman for Sri Lanka to carry his bat in Tests after Sidath Wettimuny, Marvan Atapattu and Russell Arnold. He also became the third Sri Lankan after Sanath Jayasuriya and Tillakaratne Dilshan to have made a hundred in their 50th Test. Sri Lanka won the match within three day, where South Africa was dismissed to their lowest team total since readmission. Karunaratne scored 60 runs in the second innings, which is also the highest score in the innings for Sri Lanka.

During the match, Karunaratne scored 218 runs, while South Africa made a combined total of 199 in both innings. He was the only man to score more than 50 runs in the match, where all other 21 players did not scored more than 40s. Due to his high class match winning performances, he won the man of the match award. He continued the best form in the second test as well, where he scored fifties in both innings for Sri Lanka with 53 and 85 respectively. Eventually, Sri Lanka won the second test by 199 runs and sealed the series 2-0. Due to his impressive batting performance throughout the series, he won the man of the match award and player of the series award. For his performances in 2018, he was named in the World Test XI by the ICC and ESPNCricinfo.

=== Blow to head 2019 ===
During the second Test at Canberra, suffered a blow to the back of the neck when he failed to get out of the way of a 142 km/h Pat Cummins bouncer. He laid almost motionless as medical staff inspected and eventually stretchered him off the field, for medical attention. Both Sri Lankan physio and Australian physio came to the field for the support. He was rushed to the hospital for further tests. Following medical assessments, he was released from the hospital in late evening of Saturday and cleared to bat again. Next day, after Kusal Perera was injured by another bouncer from Jhye Richardson, Karunaratne came to the field to play his innings. He reached his 22nd test fifty and got out for 59 runs. In the second innings, he scored 8 runs and Sri Lanka lost the match and the series 2-0.

=== Captaincy ===
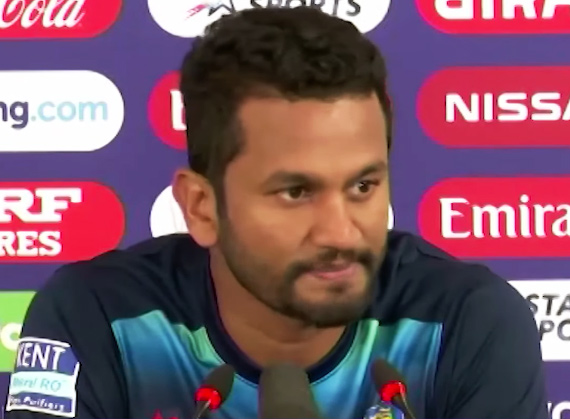
Dimuth Karunaratne in a post-match interview in 2019

Due to poor performances throughout New Zealand and Australia tours, Dinesh Chandimal was dropped from the Test squad for South Africa tour. Karunaratne was named as the stand-in captain for the tour, while Chandimal was released to play domestic cricket and regain his form with the bat. On 13 February 2019, Karunaratne became the 17th Test captain for Sri Lanka. Under his captaincy, Sri Lanka won the match by 1 wicket courtesy of Kusal Perera's unbeaten century. In the match, during South Africa's first innings, an apparent DRS timing error cost Sri Lanka a wicket of Hashim Amla. Vishwa Fernando rapped Amla on the pads for a confident appeal for lbw. Umpire Aleem Dar was unmoved, and after a short discussion Sri Lanka captain Karunaratne asked for a review - but Dar turned down the request on the basis that the visitors had taken too long to ask for it. However commentators confirmed that it took only 13 seconds when Karunaratne asked for the review.

Sri Lanka won the second match at Port Elizabeth comfortably to seal the series 2-0. This was Sri Lanka's fourth consecutive win over South Africa as well. With this win, Sri Lanka became the first Asian team to win a Test series in South Africa and third overall after England and Australia.

In March 2019, Karunaratne was arrested over a drink-drive incident in Colombo, which injured another motorist, and was later released on bail. He was fined, with Sri Lanka Cricket taking no further action on the incident. The following month, he was named as the captain of Sri Lanka's squad for the 2019 Cricket World Cup. His maiden tour as ODI captain came through Scotland tour in 2019 prior to the World Cup. First ODI was washed out due to rain. However, in the second ODI, he scored his maiden ODI fifty by scoring 77 runs. Sri Lanka posted 321 in 50 overs and finally Scotland bowled out for 199. Sri Lanka won the match by 35 runs in DLS method.

On 1 June 2019, in Sri Lanka's first match of the Cricket World Cup, Karunaratne became the second cricketer to carry his bat in a World Cup match. Sri Lanka finished the tournament as sixth in the table with 3 wins, 4 losses and 2 abandoned matches. In the first Test match against New Zealand in August 2019, Karunaratne scored a match winning century in the fourth innings to chase down a target of 267. This is the first time a team has successfully chased down a fourth-innings target of more than 100 in Galle Stadium as well. New Zealand posted 267 runs in their second innings to win the match, where Karunaratne along with Lahiru Thirimanne gave a strong opening partnership of 161 runs. This stand ranks as only the second instance where fourth innings of a Test match in Asia scored more than 150 run opening partnership. He is the third Sri Lankan opener to score a century in fourth innings after Kusal Mendis and Sanath Jayasuriya. Karunaratne won the man of the match award for his match winning performances. However, New Zealand won the second test at P. Sara oval to level the series 1-1. During West Indies tour of Sri Lanka 2020, Sri Lanka team successfully whitewashed West Indies in ODI series under Karunaratne's captaincy. It was their second consecutive ODI whitewash.

On 6 January 2021, during the second Test in South African series, Karunaratne scored his 10th test century in a stiff situation. This was his first test century in nearly a year with him last scoring a ton against New Zealand in 2019. He hit 19 boundaries in his innings. Despite his captain's innings Sri Lanka lost the match by 10 wickets and lost the series 2-0. In February 2021, Karunaratne was named in Sri Lanka's Twenty20 International (T20I) squad for their series against the West Indies.

In April 2021, during the first Test against Bangladesh, Karunaratne scored his first double century in Test cricket. Karunaratne batted entire 4th day with Dhananjaya De Silva who scored his 7th test century, without give any wicket to Bangladesh team and put strong partnership of 345 runs to put Sri Lanka in to safe position. Their partnership is a record highest partnership for any wicket in a Test match in Kandy. Karunaratne has batted through the Sri Lankan innings with his marathon lasting 11 hours. His double century 244 run is the 10th highest individual score in test cricket for Sri Lanka. Finally match ended draw and Karunaratne won player of the match award for his performance.

In the second Test of the series against Bangladesh, Karunaratne became the 10th batsman for Sri Lanka to score 5,000 runs in Test cricket. The pair Karunaratne and Lahiru Thirimanne added 209 runs, Sri Lanka's first 200-plus opening stand since 2011, and the first in the country in 21 years. The partnership, which is also the pair's third consecutive century stand. In that process, Karunaratne scored his 12th test century. He made 118 off 190 balls, having struck 15 boundaries. Courtersy of Thirimanne's century, Sri Lanka posted a huge first innings total of 493 and later Karunaratne scored a brist 66 runs in the second innings. Sri Lanka finally won the match by 202 runs and won the series 1-0. He was adjudged player of the series award for his batting performances.

On 21 November 2021, 1st test match against West Indies, Karunaratne scored his 13th test century. He scored 147 runs from 300 ball in first innings and in second innings he scored 83 runs from 103 balls. Finally Sri Lanka won the match by 187 runs and Karunaratne won player of the match award for his performance. Karunaratne is the third highest test run scorer in 2021 scoring 902 runs in 13 innings with the average of 69.38 including four centuries and three half centuries. Due to his brilliant batting performances, he was nominated to ICC's test cricketer of the year award 2021. Karunaratne was included into World Test XI by the ICC in 2021 for his year-all performances. On 14 March 2022, in the second test match against India, Karunaratne scored his 14th test century. His second test century against India also second test century in day and night test. Karunaratne is only the second visiting opener to score a fourth-innings century in India. Karunaratne equaled the record for most Test centuries by a batsman in day and night Tests. He scored 107 runs from 174 deliveries hitting 15 boundaries. He became third Sri Lankan captain to score test century in India. His efforts were in vain, as Sri Lanka lost the match by 238 runs. Due to his performance he ranked no 5 batman in ICC test batting rankings.

His good form continued in next test series against Bangladesh in March 2022. He scored two half centuries in the series and Sri Lanka won the series 2-0. In the Australian Test series in July 2022, Sri Lanka suffered a huge defeat under Karunaratne, where the match ended in three days. However on 9 July 2022, he scored 86 runs in a partnership of 152 with Kusal Mendis to make a solid foundation in the first innings of the second Test against Australia. Later Sri Lanka posted a total of 554 courtesy of Dinesh Chandimal's double hundred. Finally Sri Lanka won the match by an innings and 39 runs, marking Sri Lanka's first-ever innings victory in Test cricket against Australia. The series finally ended in draw 1-1 and shared the Warne-Murali Trophy. On 27 July 2022 in Pakistan series, Karunaratne scored 6000 test runs while reaching to his 31st test half century. He became 6th Sri Lankan batman to achieve that milestone. Courtacy of Dhananjaya De Silva's century, Sri Lanka won the match by 246 runs.

During first test match against New Zealand, Karunaratne scored his 32nd test half century also he become highest run scorer as a Sri Lankan Test opener. Dimuth Karunaratne went pass Sanath Jayasuriya’s 5932 runs tally as an opener for Sri Lanka. During second test match, Karunaratne scored half centuries in both innings. He scored 89 runs in the first innings and 51 runs in the second innings. Despite his knock Sri Lanka lose the match. Karunaratne is third highest run scorer of the series scoring 207 runs in 4 innings with the average of 51.75 including three half centuries.

Due to his performances Karunaratne selected to Wisden’s World Test Championship XI :WTC 2021-2023. He is the second-highest run scorer among openers overall. On 16 April 2023, first test match against Ireland, Karunaratne scored his 15th test century. He is the first test cricketer from Sri Lanka to score a test hundred against Ireland. He scored 179 runs from 235 balls hitting 15 boundaries. He also put 281 run partnership for second wicket with Kusal Mendis. Finally Sri Lanka won the match by an innings and 280 runs. During second test match against Ireland, Karunaratne scored his 16th test century. It was his fastest test century in his career. He scored 115 runs from 133 deliveries hitting 15 boundaries. From that knock, Karunaratne equalled the record for most Test hundreds as an opener among Sri Lankan players. Karunaratne equalled Marvan Atapattu's record of 16 Test tons with this knock. He also put strong 228 run opening partnership with Nishan Madushka. Dimuth Karunaratne is the second highest run scorer in the series scoring 294 runs in two innings with the average of 147. Finally Sri Lanka won the match by innings and 10 runs and won the series.

=== ODI comeback ===
Karunaratne was recalled to Sri Lanka's ODI squad for ODI series against Afghanistan after more than two years after he last played ODI format. He performed consistently in the series scoring 112 runs including two half centuries in three matches with the average of 56. On 19 June 2023, against UAE, Karunaratne scored his 9th ODI half century. He scored 52 runs from 54 balls and also put 95 runs opening partnership with Pathum Nissanka. Finally, Sri Lanka won the match by 175 runs. On 23 June 2023, against Oman, Karunaratne scored his 10th ODI half century. Sri Lankan bowlers restricted Oman team for 98 runs and Sri Lanka chased down the target with 10 wicket victory.

On 25 June 2023, against Ireland, Karunaratne scored his maiden ODI century. He scored 103 runs from 103 balls hitting eight boundaries. Finally with the help from bowling department, Sri Lanka won the match by 133 runs. Due to his performance Karunaratne won player of the match award. On 7 July 2023, qualifier match against West Indies, Karunaratne scored his 11th ODI half century. He scored 83 runs from 92 balls hitting 7 boundaries. He also put strong 190 run opening partnership with Pathum Nissanka. Finally, Sri Lanka won the match by 8 wickets. After He was named in 2023 Asia Cup squad for Srilanka. This is Karunaratne's first appearance in the Asia cup.

=== Post captaincy ===
Ahead of test match against Afghanistan, Dhananjaya de Silva appointed as new test captain replacing Dimuth and ending his 5 year term as test captain. Karunaratne had held the post for 30 Tests, winning 12, losing 12 and drawing six games. Sri Lanka's most notable wins under his leadership came in his first two matches in charge, as they secured a memorable Test series win in South Africa in early 2019.

Due to his performance in 2023 in test format, Karunaratne is selected to ICC Men’s Test Team of the Year, third time in his career. Despite playing just six matches in the year, Dimuth Karunaratne secures a spot in the team with memorable outings throughout 2023 in Tests having amassed 608 runs at an average of 60.8.

=== Retirement ===
Dimuth Karunaratne announced that he will retire from international cricket after the second Test of the Australian team's tour of Sri Lanka in 2025. It was his 100th Test, the second Test of the series.

In the second Test of the series, he entered the field to play his last international cricket match and after scoring 35 runs in 83 balls in the first innings, he could score only 14 runs in 28 balls in the second innings. He retired from the game as one of the great opening batsmen from Sri Lanka and the 7th Sri Lankan player to play 100 Test matches.

== List of international centuries ==
As of November 2024 Karunaratne has scored sixteen centuries in Test matches.

Key
Symbol	Meaning
*	Remained not out
†	Man of the match
Match	Matches played
Pos.	Position in the batting order
Inn.	The innings of the match
Test	The number of the Test match played in that series
S/R	Strike rate during the innings
H/A/N	Venue was at home (Sri Lanka), away or neutral
Date	Date the match was held, or the starting date of match for Test matches
Lost	The match was lost by Sri Lanka
Won	The match was won by Sri Lanka
Drawn	The match was drawn

=== Test centuries ===
Test centuries scored by Dimuth Karunaratne
No.	Score	Against	Pos.	Inn.	Test	Venue	H/A/N	Date	Result	Ref
1	152	New Zealand	1	3	1/2	(New Zealand) Hagley Oval, Christchurch	Away	16 December 2014	Lost	
2	130	Pakistan	1	1	3/3	(Sri Lanka) Pallekele Stadium, Kandy	Home	3 July 2015	Lost	
3	186	West Indies	1	1	1/2	(Sri Lanka) Galle International Stadium, Galle	Home	14 October 2015	Won	
4	110	Zimbabwe	1	3	1/2	(Zimbabwe) Harare Sports Club, Harare	Away	29 October 2016	Won	
5	126	Bangladesh	1	3	2/2	(Sri Lanka) P Sara Oval, Colombo	Home	15 March 2017	Lost	
6	141	India	1	3	2/3	(Sri Lanka) Sinhalese Sports Club Ground, Colombo	Home	3 August 2017	Lost	
7	196 †	Pakistan	1	1	2/2	(United Arab Emirates) Dubai International Cricket Stadium, Dubai	Away	6 October 2017	Won	
8	158* †	South Africa	2	1	1/2	(Sri Lanka) Galle International Stadium, Galle	Home	12 July 2018	Won	
9	122 †	New Zealand	1	4	1/2	(Sri Lanka) Galle International Stadium, Galle	Home	14 August 2019	Won	
10	102	South Africa	1	3	1/2	(South Africa) New Wanderers Stadium, Johannesburg	Away	3 January 2021	Lost	
11	244 †	Bangladesh	1	2	1/2	(Sri Lanka) Pallekele Stadium, Kandy	Home	21 April 2021	Drawn	
12	118	Bangladesh	1	1	2/2	(Sri Lanka) Pallekele Stadium, Kandy	Home	29 April 2021	Won	
13	147 †	West Indies	2	1	1/2	(Sri Lanka) Galle International Stadium, Galle	Home	21 November 2021	Won	
14	107	India	2	4	2/2	(India) M. Chinnaswamy Stadium, Bengaluru	Away	12 March 2022	Lost	
15	179	Ireland	2	1	1/2	(Sri Lanka) Galle International Stadium, Galle	Home	16 April 2023	Won	
16	115	Ireland	2	2	2/2	(Sri Lanka) Galle International Stadium, Galle	Home	20 April 2023	Won	

=== One Day International centuries ===
One Day International centuries scored by Dimuth Karunaratne
No.	Score	Against	Venue	H/A/N	Date	Result	Ref
1	103	Ireland	(Zimbabwe) Queens Sports Club, Bulawayo	Neutral	25 June 2023	Won	

== See also ==
- List of cricketers who have carried the bat in international cricket
