= Khalid Qureshi =

Personal information
- Born: 12 February 1928; Jagandurnager, British India
- Died: 10 February 2016 (aged 87)
- Batting: Left-handed
- Bowling: Slow left-arm orthodox
- Relatives: Amjad Qureshi (father)

Domestic team information
- Years: Team
- 1951/52–1957/58: Punjab
- 1958/59–1966/67: Lahore

Career statistics
Competition	First-class
Matches	42
Runs scored	370
Batting average	10.57
100s/50s	0/2
Top score	65
Balls bowled	8,933
Wickets	143
Bowling average	19.60
5 wickets in innings	8
10 wickets in match	1
Best bowling	9/28
Catches/stumpings	12/–
- Source: CricketArchive, 7 November 2014

Khalid Qureshi (12 February 1928 – 10 February 2016) was a Pakistani cricketer who played first-class cricket from 1949 to 1966. He toured India in 1952–53 with the Pakistan team but did not play Test cricket.

A left-arm spinner, Qureshi made his first-class debut in two matches for Pakistan in 1949–50, against the Commonwealth XI and Ceylon. He toured India with Pakistan's first touring team in 1952–53 and played in six of the first-class matches, taking 17 wickets at an average of 28.23. He played as a professional for Lowerhouse in the Lancashire League in 1954 and 1955, taking in all 100 wickets at 13.25.

In the Quaid-e-Azam Trophy in 1956–57 he took 6 for 18 and 6 for 61 to give Punjab an innings victory over Bahawalpur. He also took five wickets in the final, which Punjab won. In 1959–60, opening the bowling for Lahore and bowling 24 overs unchanged, he took 8 for 24 against Railways. The next season, captaining Lahore in the Ayub Trophy, he took 9 for 28 in the first innings against Lahore Education Board. These were record bowling figures for Pakistan cricket until Ahad Khan took 9 for 7 in 1964–65.

His father, Amjad Qureshi, and two brothers also played first-class cricket.
