= N. Kannayiram =

Indian cricketer

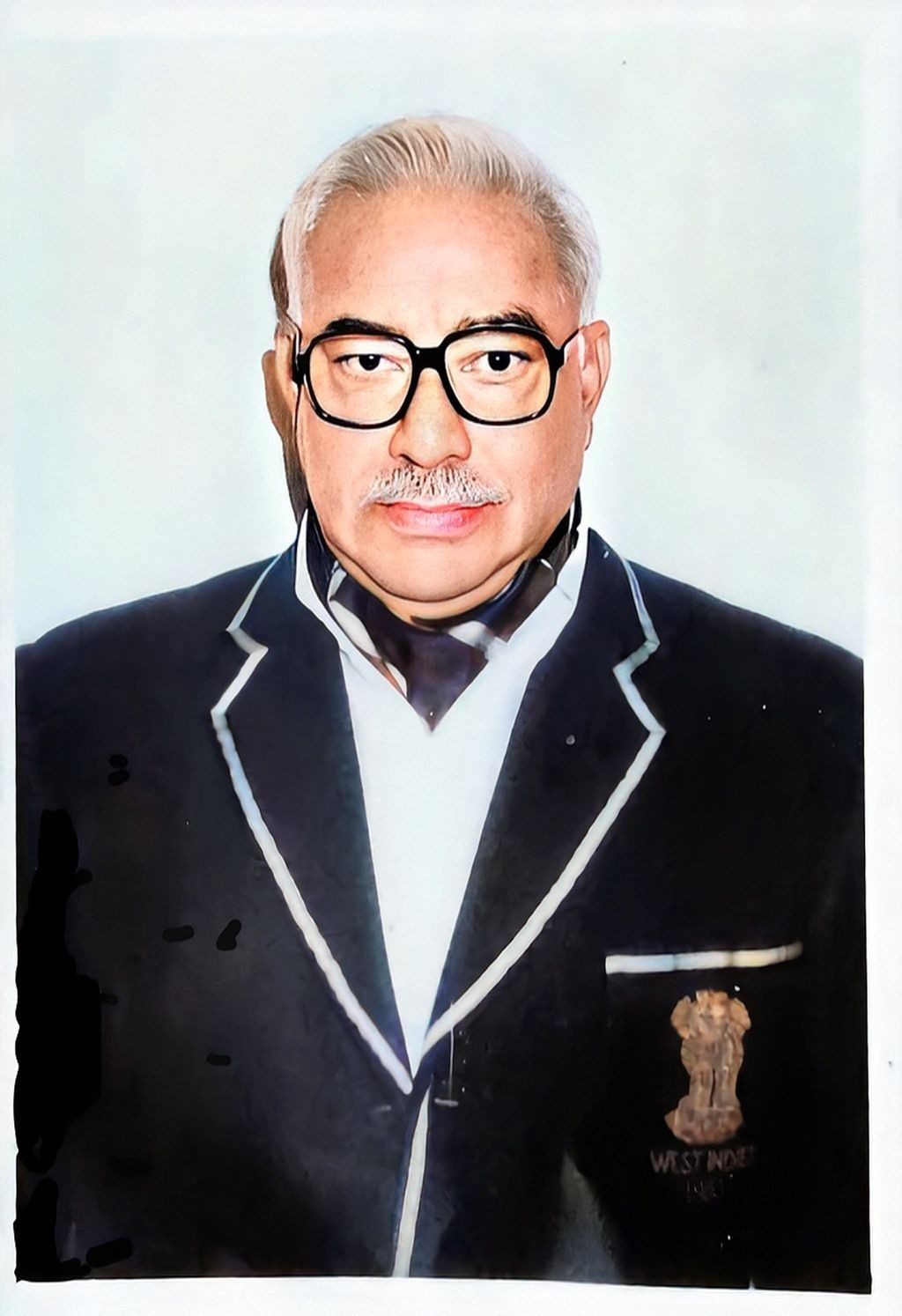

Personal information
- Full name: N. Kannayiram Pillai
- Born: 20 October 1924; Madurai, Tamil Nadu, India
- Died: 1 January 1996 (aged 71); Madurai, Tamil Nadu
- Bowling: Right-arm fast-medium

Domestic team information
- Years: Team
- 1948/49–1956/57: Madras
- 1948/49–1952/53: South Zone

Career statistics
| Competition | First-class |
|---|---|
| Matches | 25 |
| Runs scored | 552 |
| Batting average | 18.40 |
| 100s/50s | 0/1 |
| Top score | 56 not out |
| Balls bowled | 3,055 |
| Wickets | 48 |
| Bowling average | 29.77 |
| 5 wickets in innings | 2 |
| 10 wickets in match | 0 |
| Best bowling | 6/43 |
| Catches/stumpings | 6/– |
- Source: ESPNcricinfo, 3 December 2014

N. Kannayiram (20 October 1924 – 1 January 1996) was a cricketer who played first-class cricket in India between 1948 and 1956. He toured the West Indies in 1952–53, but did not play Test cricket.

Kannayiram was educated at Madras Christian College. A middle-order batsman and opening bowler, he captained the Madras University cricket team in the Rohinton Baria Trophy in 1948–49 and 1949–50 and played for Indian Universities in first-class matches against a Commonwealth XI in 1949–50 and MCC in 1951–52.

In 1948–49, in his first match for Madras, he took his best figures, 6 for 43 against Bombay in a quarter-final of the Ranji Trophy. In 1951–52 he took 6 for 59 against Mysore and a few days later made his highest score, 56 not out, playing for South Zone against the touring MCC.

He replaced Gopalaswamy Kasturirangan in the Indian team which toured the West Indies in 1952–53 after Kasturirangan and four others withdrew from the originally selected team. He played in three of the first-class matches, scoring 44 runs and taking two wickets. After the tour he played seven more matches for Madras over the next four seasons.

When the Madurai District Cricket Association was formed in 1958, Kannayiram was appointed as its first secretary. The trophy for the fourth division "A" section of the Tamil Nadu Cricket Association is named the "N. Kannayiram Shield" in his honour.
