= Commerce College Ground =

Cricket ground in Ahmedabad, India

- Full name: Hargovandas Lakhmichand College of Commerce Ground
- Location: Ahmedabad, India
- Capacity: 5,000

Construction
- Opened: 1945

Tenant
- Gujarat cricket team

Website
- ESPNcricinfo

Commerce College Ground is a cricket ground in Ahmedabad, India. The ground regularly hosts Ranji matches for Gujarat cricket team from 1945 to 1959. To date, the ground has hosted 15 first-class matches including tour matches against New Zealand cricket team and Australia cricket team since then ground hosted non-first-class matches until 1967.

== Tour matches ==
27 December –
29 December 1959
scorecard

Indian Board President's XI	v	Australia
293 (90.2 overs); Man Sood 73; Lindsay Kline 4-72 (27.0 overs)		554/6 dec. (134.0 overs); Norm O'Neill 284; William Ghosh 3-195 (40.0 overs)
143/5 (36.0 overs); Manohar Hardikar 59; Richie Benaud 2-13 (8.0 overs)

Match drawn
Commerce College Ground, Ahmedabad, India
Umpires: Habib Choudhury and Badami Satyaji Rao
