= Gopalaswamy Kasturirangan =

Indian cricketer (1930–2020)

Personal information
- Full name: Gopalaswamy Iyenger Kasturirangan
- Born: 12 October 1930; Madras (now Chennai), Madras Presidency, British India (now in Tamil Nadu, India)
- Died: 19 August 2020 (aged 89); Bengaluru, India
- Batting: Right-handed
- Bowling: Right-arm medium-pace

Domestic team information
- Years: Team
- 1948–1963: Mysore

Career statistics
Competition	First-class
Matches	36
Runs scored	421
Batting average	15.03
100s/50s	0/0
Top score	41*
Balls bowled	6015
Wickets	94
Bowling average	22.02
5 wickets in innings	2
10 wickets in match	0
Best bowling	6/42
Catches/stumpings	18/–
- Source: ESPNcricinfo, 4 December 2014

Gopalaswamy Iyenger Kasturirangan (12 October 1930 – 19 August 2020) was a cricketer who played first-class cricket in India from 1948 to 1963.

Kasturirangan was an opening bowler who bowled "sharp inswingers ... off the wrong foot". He played cricket for the Mysore University team in the Rohinton Baria Trophy from 1947–48 to 1950–51, taking three wickets in the final in his last season, when Mysore University won.

Kasturirangan made his first-class debut in the 1948–49 season for Mysore in the Ranji Trophy. In 1951–52 Ranji Trophy matches he took 12 wickets at an average of 10.33. He was selected to tour the West Indies with India in 1952–53 but declined the invitation and was replaced by N. Kannayiram.

He continued to play for Mysore, and captained the team from 1960–61 until his retirement after the 1962–63 season. His best figures were 6 for 42 (match figures of 53–18–98–8) against Hyderabad in 1961–62.

After his playing career ended, Kasturirangan served in various administrative positions for Karnataka (as Mysore became in the 1970s), including a period as selector. He was for a time the groundsman at M. Chinnaswamy Stadium, and he used his knowledge of the preparation of turf as chairman of the Board of Control for Cricket in India's grounds and pitches committee.
