= Israr Ali =

Pakistani cricketer (1927–2016)

Personal information
- Born: 1 May 1927; Jalandhar, Punjab Province, British India
- Died: 1 February 2016 (aged 88); Okara, Pakistan
- Batting: Left-handed
- Bowling: Left-arm fast-medium
- Role: Allrounder

International information
- National side: Pakistan (1952–1959)
- Test debut (cap 6): 16 October 1952 v India
- Last Test: 21 November 1959 v Australia

Career statistics
| Competition | Test | First-class |
|---|---|---|
| Matches | 4 | 40 |
| Runs scored | 33 | 1,130 |
| Batting average | 4.71 | 20.54 |
| 100s/50s | 0/0 | 0/6 |
| Top score | 10 | 79 |
| Balls bowled | 318 | 6,190 |
| Wickets | 6 | 114 |
| Bowling average | 27.50 | 22.63 |
| 5 wickets in innings | 0 | 6 |
| 10 wickets in match | 0 | 1 |
| Best bowling | 2/29 | 9/58 |
| Catches/stumpings | 1/– | 22/– |
- Source: CricketArchive, 12 July 2019

Israr Ali (1 May 1927 – 1 February 2016) was a member of Pakistan's first Test team that played against India in India in 1952–53. Born in Jalandhar, British India, Israr was an allrounder. He played two Tests as a top-order batsman in 1952–53 with huge success, then two more against the visiting Australians in 1959–60 as a lower order batsman and opening bowler, taking 6 wickets at 25.66, dismissing Les Favell four times.

In 1957–58, playing for Bahawalpur against Punjab A in the Quaid-i-Azam Trophy, he took 9 for 58 in one innings (11 for 88 in the match). In the quarter-finals of the competition that season, he took 6 for 1 (figures of 11–10–1–6) to dismiss Dacca University for 39, after hitting his highest score of 79.

His career began in the 1946–47 Ranji Trophy and ended in 1960–61. He played the 1959 English season as a professional for Bacup in the Lancashire League, making 912 runs at 50.66 and taking 48 wickets at 22.95.

On the death of Aslam Khokhar on 22 January 2011, Israr Ali became Pakistan's oldest living Test cricketer. He died on 1 February 2016 at the age of 88.
