= Khurshid Ahmed (cricketer) =

Pakistani cricketer

Personal information
- Born: 1934 (age 91–92); Amritsar, British India
- Batting: Right-handed
- Role: Wicket-keeper

Career statistics
Competition	First-class
Matches	5
Runs scored	208
Batting average	23.11
100s/50s	1/1
Top score	101
Catches/stumpings	5/1
- Source: CricketArchive, 7 January 2017

Khurshid Ahmed (born 1934) is a Pakistani former cricketer who played first-class cricket in 1952 and 1953.

A wicketkeeper-batsman, Khurshid Ahmed toured England with Pakistan Eaglets in 1952. He was selected as the reserve wicketkeeper for Pakistan's first Test tour, to India in 1952-53, but played in only four of the 12 first-class matches and none of the Tests. On the tour he scored a century in his first first-class match, against Central Zone. He opened the batting in the second innings, and after the first three wickets had fallen for 18 he added 189 for the fourth wicket with his captain, Abdul Hafeez Kardar, and finished with 101 in 137 minutes. He played one first-class match soon after the tour, then disappeared from the first-class game while still in his teens.
