= Vijay Rajindernath =

Indian cricketer

Personal information
- Born: 7 January 1928; Amritsar, British India
- Died: 22 November 1989 (aged 61); Chennai, India
- Batting: Right-handed
- Role: Wicketkeeper-batsman

International information
- National side: India
- Test debut (cap 66): 13 November 1952 v Pakistan
- Last Test: 13 November 1952 v Pakistan

Career statistics
Competition	Tests	First-class
Matches	1	28
Runs scored	–	844
Batting average	–	22.21
100s/50s	–/–	1/3
Top score	–	136
Catches/stumpings	0/4	35/24
- Source: ESPNcricinfo, 10 January 2013

Vijay Rajindernath (7 January 1928 – 22 November 1989) was an Indian cricketer.

== Career ==
Rajindernath was one of the four wicket-keepers that India tried against Pakistan in the 1952–53 series. He played in the Third Test at Bombay which India won losing only four wickets. Rajindernath did not bat but affected four stumpings, three of which were off Subhash Gupte. He holds the Test record for the most stumpings in a complete career without a catch. He was replaced by Ebrahim Maka for the next Test.

Rajindernath also played in three unofficial Tests against a touring Commonwealth XI in 1950–51. In December 1950 he hit his only first-class century, when he scored 136 for Bihar in their innings victory over Orissa in the Ranji Trophy.

Rajindernath studied at Government College, Lahore, and took an MA in Hindi from Benares. He worked for Burmah Shell and later with Indo-Nippon batteries in Baroda.

== See also ==
- One Test Wonder

== Sources ==
- Obituary in ACSSI almanac, 1989/90
