= Carlton John =

West Indian cricket umpire

Personal information
- Born: 1915
- Died: 14 August 2008 (aged 92–93); Mucurapo, Trinidad

Umpiring information
- Tests umpired: 2 (1953)
- Source: Cricinfo, 7 July 2013

Carlton John (1915 – 14 August 2008) was a West Indian cricket umpire. He stood in two Test matches in 1953, both against India.

== See also ==
- List of Test cricket umpires
- Indian cricket team in West Indies in 1952–53
