= Wasuderao Sane =

Indian cricketer

Personal information
- Full name: Wasuderao Dattatraya Sane
- Born: 14 January 1914; Amravati, Maharashtra, British India
- Died: 25 February 1991 (aged 77); Nagpur, Maharashtra, India
- Batting: Right-handed
- Bowling: Left-arm medium-pace
- Relatives: Narayan Sane (brother)

Career statistics
Competition	First-class
Matches	17
Runs scored	512
Batting average	19.69
100s/50s	0/2
Top score	59 not out
Balls bowled	3636
Wickets	55
Bowling average	24.94
5 wickets in innings	3
10 wickets in match	0
Best bowling	6/90
Catches/stumpings	6/–
- Source: Cricinfo, 17 September 2017

Wasuderao Dattatraya Sane (14 January 1914 – 25 February 1991) played 17 matches of first-class cricket for several teams in India from 1937 to 1959.

A left-arm medium-pace bowler and middle-order batsman, in 1947-48 Sane captained Central Provinces and Berar in their only Ranji Trophy victory; he took 4 for 20 and 3 for 35 in the 113-run victory over Mysore. In his only other match as captain he led Madhya Pradesh to an innings defeat against Holkar in 1953–54, taking 6 for 191 in Holkar's innings and top-scoring for Madhya Pradesh with 43 in the second innings.

He played in Vidarbha's debut match in the Ranji Trophy in 1957–58, taking 3 for 45 and 4 for 38 against Uttar Pradesh. A year later, a few days after his 45th birthday, he took his best figures of 6 for 60 for Vidarbha against Madhya Pradesh.

Sane was later an umpire. His elder brother Narayan was also a first-class cricketer and umpire.
