= Edgar Barrett =

Australian cricketer

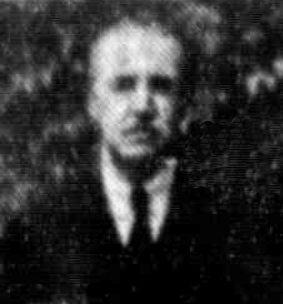

Personal information
- Born: 26 June 1869; Melbourne, Australia
- Died: 29 April 1959 (aged 89); Melbourne, Australia

Domestic team information
- Years: Team
- 1889-1895: Victoria
- Source: Cricinfo, 25 July 2015

Edgar Barrett (26 June 1869 – 29 April 1959) was an Australian cricketer and Australian rules footballer. He played five first-class cricket matches for Victoria between 1889 and 1895.

Bennett played football for South Melbourne, becoming the leading goalkicker in the Victorian Football Association (VFA) in his debut season in 1889. (His brother Jack Barrett is sometimes incorrectly credited for this.)

== See also ==
- List of Victoria first-class cricketers
