= Linganath Subbu =

Indian cricketer (1931–2014)

Personal information
- Full name: Linganath Thammiah Subbu
- Born: 15 April 1931; Bangalore, India
- Died: 16 September 2014 (aged 83)
- Batting: Right-handed
- Bowling: Right-arm medium pace
- Relatives: L. T. Adisesh (brother)

Domestic team information
- Years: Team
- 1951/52–1958/59: Mysore
- 1958/59: South Zone
- 1959/60: Madhya Pradesh

Career statistics
Competition	First-class
Matches	18
Runs scored	581
Batting average	22.34
100s/50s	0/3
Top score	59
Balls bowled	1,358
Wickets	23
Bowling average	28.13
5 wickets in innings	0
10 wickets in match	0
Best bowling	3/13
Catches/stumpings	20/–
- Source: ESPNcricinfo, 29 March 2024

Linganath Thammiah Subbu (15 April 1931 – 16 September 2014) was an Indian cricketer. He played first-class cricket, mostly for Mysore, between 1951 and 1960.
