= Reliance Stadium =

Sports stadium

Coordinates: 22°20′51.78″N 73°08′30.11″E

- Indian Petrochemicals Corporation Ltd Sports Complex Ground
- Interactive map of Reliance Stadium

Ground information
- Location: Vadodara, Gujarat, India
- Country: India
- Establishment: 1990
- Capacity: 20,000
- Owner: Reliance Industries
- Architect: Rakesh Parikh
- Operator: Baroda Cricket Association
- Tenants: Indian Cricket Team; Baroda cricket team
- End names
- n/a

International information
- First men's ODI: 28 October 1994: India v New Zealand
- Last men's ODI: 10 December 2010: India v New Zealand
- First women's ODI: 16 December 1997: South Africa v Pakistan
- Last women's ODI: 14 October 2019: India v South Africa
- First women's T20I: 2 April 2013: India v Bangladesh
- Last women's T20I: 5 April 2013: India v Bangladesh
- As of 25 February 2024; Source: Reliance Stadium, ESPNcricinfo

Reliance Stadium or Indian Petrochemicals Corporation Ltd Sports Complex Ground also known as the IPCL Ground is located in Vadodara, Gujarat.

The stadium is owned by Reliance Industries and is also known as Reliance Stadium. The stadium is the home ground of the Baroda cricket team, one of India's domestic teams.

The stadium has hosted 10 ODI matches since 1994, the last one in 2010 (part of the India New Zealand series December 2010), but has yet to stage a Test match.

== History ==
One of the four first-class and two international grounds in Vadodara, the IPCL Sports Complex Ground is part of the sprawling IPCL complex, situated about 10 kilometers from the city centre. The ground was owned and maintained by the Reliance Industries and has taken preference over the oldest cricket ground in Asia the Moti Bagh Stadium for ODIs.

The batsmen have traditionally enjoyed this high-scoring venue with a true wicket that holds up throughout the length of a 50-over game.

== One Day International cricket ==
The stadium has hosted following ODI matches till date.

Team (A)	Team (B)	Winner	Margin	Year
India	New Zealand	India	By 7 Wickets	1994
Netherlands	New Zealand	New Zealand	BY 119 Runs	1996
India	Zimbabwe	India	By 13 Runs	1998
India	South Africa	India	By 4 Wickets	2000
India	West Indies	West Indies	By 5 Wickets	2002
India	Sri Lanka	India	By 5 Wickets	2005
India	West Indies	India	By 160 runs	2007
India	Australia	Australia	By 9 Wickets	2007
India	Australia	Australia	By 4 runs	2009
India	New Zealand	India	By 9 Wickets	2010

Game Statistics:

Category	Information
Highest Team Score	India (341/3 in 50 overs against West Indies)
Lowest Team Score	India (148 all out in 39.4 overs against Australia)
Best Batting Performance	Gautam Gambhir (126 runs)
Most Prolific Batsman	Sachin Tendulkar (442 Runs)
Best Bowling Performance	Mitchell Johnson (5/26 against India)

== List of Centuries ==
=== Key ===
- * denotes that the batsman was not out.
- Inns. denotes the number of the innings in the match.
- Balls denotes the number of balls faced in an innings.
- NR denotes that the number of balls was not recorded.
- Parentheses next to the player's score denotes his century number at Edgbaston.
- The column title Date refers to the date the match started.
- The column title Result refers to the player's team result

=== One Day Internationals ===
Australian cricket team captain Ricky Ponting tries to hook a ball off India's Asish Nehra at Vadodara

No.	Score	Player	Team	Balls	Inns.	Opposing team	Date	Result
1	108	Ken Rutherford	New Zealand	102	1	India	28 October 1994	Lost
2	115	Sachin Tendulkar	India	136	2	New Zealand	28 October 1994	Won
3	122	Sachin Tendulkar	India	138	2	South Africa	17 March 2000	Won
4	101	Chris Gayle	West Indies	107	2	India	18 March 2002	Won
5	100*	Sachin Tendulkar	India	76	1	West Indies	31 January 2007	Won
6	126*	Gautam Gambhir	India	117	2	New Zealand	4 December 2010	Won

== List of Five Wicket Hauls ==
=== Key ===
Symbol	Meaning
†	The bowler was man of the match
‡	10 or more wickets taken in the match
§	One of two five-wicket hauls by the bowler in the match
Date	Day the Test started or ODI was held
Inn	Innings in which five-wicket haul was taken
Overs	Number of overs bowled.
Runs	Number of runs conceded
Wkts	Number of wickets taken
Econ	Runs conceded per over
Batsmen	Batsmen whose wickets were taken
Drawn	The match was drawn.

=== One Day Internationals ===
No.	Bowler	Date	Team	Opposing team	Inn	Overs	Runs	Wkts	Econ	Batsmen	Result
1	Mitchell Johnson †	11 October 2007	Australia	India	1	10	26	5	2.6	Yuvraj Singh; Robin Uthappa; MS Dhoni; Irfan Pathan; Murali Kartik	Australia Won

== Trivia ==
- Sachin Tendulkar has scored three centuries in six matches on this ground and won the Man of the Match award on all three occasions. Tendulkar's overall record is 442 runs at an average of 85.60.
- The highest team score posted here is 341/3 on 31 Jan 2007 by the Indian national cricket team against West Indies national cricket team.
- The lowest team score posted here is 148 all out on 11 Oct 2007, also by Indian national cricket team against Australia national cricket team.
- The leading run scorers here have been Sachin Tendulkar- 442 runs, Saurav Ganguly- 290 runs and Gautam Gambhir- 194 runs.
- The leading wicket takers here have been Mitchell Johnson- 7 wickets and Ajit Agarkar- 5 wickets.
