= Toby Rollox =

West Indian cricketer and umpire

Personal information
- Born: 19 January 1913; Georgetown, British Guiana

Umpiring information
- Tests umpired: 1 (1953)
- Source: Cricinfo, 15 July 2013

Toby Rollox (Note: While both sources refer to him as Toby Rollox, CricketArchive gives his full name as Alwyn B. Rollox, while Cricinfo gives it as Jonathan Bartholomew Rollox.) (born 19 January 1913) was a West Indian cricket umpire and player. He stood in one Test match, West Indies vs. India, in 1953. He also made five first-class appearances for British Guiana.

Rollox was an all-rounder, a left-handed batsman and slow left-arm orthodox spin bowler, who represented British Guiana sporadically between 1932 and 1951. He umpired 10 first-class matches, all at the Bourda ground in Georgetown, between 1947 and 1956.

== See also ==
- List of Test cricket umpires
- Indian cricket team in West Indies in 1952–53
