= Kenneth Powell (sprinter) =

Indian sprinter (1940–2022)

- Born: 20 April 1940; Kolar, Mysore, British India
- Died: 11 December 2022 (aged 82); Bangalore, Karnataka, India
- Other name: The Gentleman Sprinter
- Occupation: Track and field athlete
- Height: 5 ft 7 in (170 cm)
- Awards: Arjuna Award (1965); Rajyotsava Award (2018)

Kenneth Lawrence Powell (20 April 1940 – 11 December 2022), popularly known as "The Gentleman Sprinter", was an Indian track and field athlete from the state of Karnataka. He competed in the 1964 Olympics and the 1970 Asian Games. He was a recipient of the Government of India's Arjuna Award in 1965 and Government of Karnataka's Rajyotsava Award in 2018.

== Early life ==
Powell was born on 20 April 1940 in Kolar, in the present-day Indian state of Karnataka. His first major event was a third-place finish at the 1957 National School Games in Calcutta (present-day Kolkata).

== Career ==
Powell moved to Bangalore when he was 19, and joined the Indian Telephone Industries (ITI) Limited, where he was coached by the Rangers Athletics club's coach Krishna. In an interview many years later, Powell would admit that his becoming an athlete was an accident. He set out to be a cricketer and was a fast bowler with ITI. Coach Benjamin Frank recommended that he pick up sprinting after seeing his ability to run fast.

Powell was one of India's top athletes in the 1960s and was known to have had a healthy rivalry with Milkha Singh. He was a member of the Indian 4 × 100 metres relay team that made it to the semifinals of the 1964 Tokyo Olympics. In the same Olympics, he also represented the country in the 100 metres and the 200 metres sprint events. He was also a member of the team that won bronze at the 1970 Asian Games. He had previously been left off the squad for the 1966 Asian Games also in Bangkok. During his career, Powell took home 19 sprinting titles from events all over India.

Powell also represented Karnataka in the National Handball Championship in 1970 and also won the silver medal for the 40–44 age-group in the 100m event at the Asia Masters Athletics Championships in Singapore in 1981. He was also a finalist in the 45–49 age-group event at the World Masters Athletics Championships in Melbourne.

He was also known as The Gentleman Sprinter. After working at the ITI, he was employed with the railways, and later with Tata Steel from where he retired in 1997. Powell remained associated with athletics in Karnataka after his retirement. He had spoken out against the Kanteerava Stadium's state and had suggested a ban on use of the facilities for non-sporting purposes.

== Awards ==
Powell received the Arjuna Award from the Government of India in 1965. He was the first sportsperson from Karnataka to win the award. He received the Karnataka government's Rajyotsava Award in 2018.

== Personal life and death ==
Powell was married to Daphne Powell (née Simon), who was also an athlete in her younger years. The couple lived in the Cooke Town neighborhood of Bangalore.

Powell died in Bangalore on 11 December 2022, at age 82.
