= Indian Universities cricket team =

Indian cricket team

The Indian Universities cricket team played 16 three-day first-class matches, all but one against teams touring India, between October 1949 and December 1975.

== Matches ==
Of their 16 first-class matches, Indian Universities lost two (against the New Zealanders in 1955-56 and the West Indians in 1958–59) and drew the other 14. Only a few of the drawn matches came close to achieving a result. Against the Pakistanis in 1952–53, Indian Universities gained a first-innings lead of 248 after Jayasinghrao Ghorpade took 6 for 19 to dismiss the Pakistanis for 92; but rain prevented play on the final day. Against Ceylon in 1964–65, Indian Universities needed 89 to win and finished at 78 for 3 after 20 overs.

The one first-class match by Indian Universities that did not take place in India was against Ceylon Board President's XI in Colombo in 1970–71. Sunil Gavaskar top-scored in each innings with 30 and 76 not out, and the Ceylon team, needing 106 for victory, reached 93 for 6 in 18 overs. The Universities team also played five non-first-class matches against university teams on the short tour of Ceylon.

A four-day match between Indian Universities and England A in 1994-95 was ruled not first-class by the Board of Control for Cricket in India, as only one of the Universities team had first-class experience. England A won by 439 runs.

Ghorpade's 6 for 19 in 1952-53 were the best figures for Indian Universities. Ambar Roy's 135 in the 1964-65 match was the highest individual score.

== Test players ==
Many Indian Universities players went on to play Test cricket. From the first side in 1949–50, for example, Nana Joshi, Pankaj Roy, Polly Umrigar, Gulabrai Ramchand, Deepak Shodhan and Subhash Gupte played Tests for India. Three of the 1970-71 side (Ashok Gandotra, Mohinder Amarnath and Budhi Kunderan) had already played Test cricket, while another four (Gavaskar, Kenia Jayantilal, Surinder Amarnath and Dilip Doshi) would later do so.
