= Man Sood =

Indian cricketer (1939–2020)

Personal information
- Full name: Man Mohan Sood
- Born: 6 July 1939; Lahore, Punjab Province, British India
- Died: 19 January 2020 (aged 80); New Delhi, India
- Batting: Right-handed

International information
- National side: India
- Only Test (cap 98): 13 January 1960 v Australia

Domestic team information
- Years: Team
- 1956–57 – 1963–64: Delhi
- 1960–61 – 1962–63: North Zone

Career statistics
Competition	Tests	First-class
Matches	1	35
Runs scored	3	1214
Batting average	1.50	28.23
100s/50s	-/-	1/9
Top score	3	170
Balls bowled	–	252
Wickets	–	2
Bowling average	–	77.50
5 wickets in innings	–	–
10 wickets in match	–	–
Best bowling	–	1/13
Catches/stumpings	-/-	6/-
- Source: ESPNcricinfo, 9 February 2020

Man Mohan Sood (6 July 1939 – 19 January 2020) was an Indian cricketer. He was born in Lahore, and played in one Test in 1960. He played first-class cricket in India from 1957 to 1965.

Sood was a middle-order batsman. After top-scoring with 73 for the Indian Board President's XI against the touring Australians in late December 1959 he was selected for the Fourth Test two weeks later. Batting at number nine, he failed twice, and India lost by an innings. He made his only first-class century in 1960–61 when he scored a quick 170 for Delhi against Southern Punjab, adding 290 for the fifth wicket with Ramesh Saxena.

He was later a prominent cricket administrator in the Delhi & District Cricket Association, and served as a national selector in the 1980s.
