= Jamshed Patel =

Indian cricket umpire (1914–1987)

Personal information
- Full name: Jamshed Rustomji Patel
- Born: 18 April 1914; Bombay, India
- Died: 13 October 1987 (aged 73); Bombay, India

Umpiring information
- Tests umpired: 9 (1948–1958)
- Source: ESPNcricinfo, 14 July 2013

Jamshed Patel (18 April 1914 – 13 October 1987) was an Indian cricket umpire. He stood in nine Test matches between 1948 and 1958.

== See also ==
- List of Test cricket umpires
