= Punya Datta =

Indian cricketer

Personal information
- Full name: Punya Brata Datta
- Born: 21 June 1924; Sylhet, Assam Province, British India
- Died: 12 November 2016 (aged 92); Kolkata, West Bengal, India
- Nickname: Badal Dutta
- Batting: Left-handed
- Bowling: Left-arm medium
- Role: All rounder

Domestic team information
- Years: Team
- 1944/45–1955/56: Bengal
- 1947: Cambridge University
- Source: Cricinfo, 27 March 2016

Punya Datta (21 June 1924 – 12 November 2016) was an Indian cricketer. He played first-class cricket for Bengal and Cambridge University. In a first-class career spanning from 1944–45 to 1955–56, Datta scored 1,459 runs with a highest of 143. He averaged 29.77 with the bat, scored 4 centuries and 5 fifties, and held 12 catches. He captured 41 wickets at 37.09, and his best innings figures were 5 for 52.

Datta made his first-class debut for Bengal, under the captaincy of the Maharaja of Cooch Behar, against United Provinces at Eden Gardens in 1944–45. After attending Asutosh College in Calcutta he went to Trinity Hall, Cambridge. At the end of his freshman year he represented the university in 13 first-class matches in 1947, scoring 320 runs at 22.85 and taking 29 wickets at 40.68, and winning his Blue. On returning to India he continued to represent Bengal, scoring 141 in the final of the Ranji Trophy in 1952–53.

Datta received the Kartick Bose Lifetime Achievement Award in 2004 in recognition of his contributions to cricket in Bengal. He was chairman of the board of trustees of the Cricket Association of Bengal from 2008–09 to 2012–13. He was also the president of the Calcutta Cricket and Football Club.
