= Benjamin Frank =

Indian cricketer (1919–1986)

Personal information
- Born: 1919; Bangalore, Mysore, British India
- Died: 12 August 1986 (aged 66–67); Bangalore, Karnataka, India
- Source: ESPNcricinfo, 27 March 2016

Benjamin Frank (1919 – 12 August 1986) was an Indian cricketer. He played first-class cricket for Assam, Bengal and Mysore. He played for Bengal in the 1952–53 Ranji Trophy.

Frank made his first-class debut playing in the Bombay Pentangular in the 1940s. He went on to play for Mysore state, before joining the Mohun Bagan Club in Calcutta. Here he played with success against touring teams becoming the first Indian player to score a century against the West Indian side in 1948. A few years later he scored 93 against the visiting Pakistanis. Cricket writer Ramachandra Guha writes that he would have made the national side had he not come from an underprivileged background.

In 1959, Benjamin Frank recommended that Kenneth Powell, a bowler for Kolar Gold Fields, switch to running.

== See also ==
- List of Bengal cricketers
