= Jaywant Lele =

Indian cricket administrator (1938–2013)

Jaywant Y. Lele (13 September 1938 – 19 September 2013 in Baroda) was an Indian cricket administrator, best remembered for serving as the secretary of the Board of Control for Cricket in India (BCCI) from 1996 to 2001, being preceded by Jagmohan Dalmiya and succeeded by Niranjan Shah. He also authored a memoir titled I Was There: Memoirs of a Cricket Administrator (2011).
