= Baba Sidhaye =

Yeshwant Sidhaye
Personal information
- Full name: Yeshwant Prabhakar Sidhaye
- Born: 10 April 1932; Iran
- Died: 24 November 2002 (aged 70); Pune, Maharashtra, India
- Nickname: Baba, Panther
- Batting: Right-handed
- Bowling: Leg break googly

Domestic team information
- Years: Team
- 1952/53–1966/67: Maharashtra
- 1954/55: Bombay
- 1961/62–1967/68: Railways

Career statistics
| Competition | FC |
|---|---|
| Matches | 51 |
| Runs scored | 1,862 |
| Batting average | 27.79 |
| 100s/50s | 1/10 |
| Top score | 135 |
| Balls bowled | 772 |
| Wickets | 13 |
| Bowling average | 37.61 |
| 5 wickets in innings | 0 |
| 10 wickets in match | 0 |
| Best bowling | 2/14 |
| Catches/stumpings | 36/– |
- Source: ESPNcricinfo, 20 June 2016

Yeshwant Sidhaye (10 April 1932 – 24 November 2002), better known as Baba Sidhaye, was an Indian first-class cricketer who played for Maharashtra, Bombay and Railways. A deaf and mute cricketer, Sidhaye is recognized by the Limca Book of Records for his efforts. He is regarded as the "first deaf and mute cricketer to have taken the field" and one of the best fielders in India during his playing career.

== Early life ==
Sidhaye was born on 10 April 1932 and hails from a village called Konshi near Sawantwadi in Maharashtra. He was deaf and mute by birth. He later moved to Pune to play cricket.

== Career ==
Sidhaye made his first-class debut for Maharashtra at the age of 20 and went on to appear in 51 matches. He played most of his cricket for Maharashtra and Railways, and made a few appearances for Bombay, Indian Universities and West Zone. His only first-class hundred of 135 runs came while playing for Maharashtra against Baroda at the 1956–57 Ranji Trophy during which he shared a 238-run partnership with captain Bapu Nadkarni. Although Sidhaye did not play international cricket, he appeared in first-class matches against the visiting New Zealand, West Indian, Australian and Ceylonese teams during various points of his career.

Sidhaye also played for the Hindu Gymkhana in the Kanga League and, in 1972, hit a 59-minute century in a match, which was then a world record.

Sidhaye also coached cricketers after his playing career. He was the coach of the Bombay Cricket Association and is said to have trained over 50 first-class cricketers. He spotted Balwinder Sandhu at a summer coaching camp and trained him, before Sandhu went on to play for India.

== Playing style ==
Sidhaye was as a hard-hitting middle-order batsman and part-time leg spinner. He was known as an agile fielder in the covers and earned the nickname "Panther" due to his swift movement while fielding. Bapu Nadkarni, who was the captain of Sidhaye at Maharashtra and Hindu Gymkhana, recalls, "He was a wonderfully gifted player. Under my captaincy, he scored three centuries, each one being a gem. And what a fielder! He and Ravi Bhadbhade in the covers were simply brilliant. Getting the ball past them was impossible. Baba enjoyed his cricket and didn't bother about anything."

== Personal life ==
Sidhaye and his wife Pramodini Sidhaye had a son and two daughters; their son Pravin Sidhaye also played cricket. Baba Sidhaye died on 24 November 2002 after a prolonged illness.

In 2011, Sidhaye was recognized by the Limca Book of Records for having "excelled in the field of cricket" despite being "differently-abled".

== See also ==
- Iqbal, an Indian film about a deaf and mute boy who aspires to be a cricketer.
