= Nazar Mohammad =

Pakistani cricketer

Nazar Mohammad نذر محمد
Personal information
- Born: 5 March 1921; Lahore, Punjab, British India
- Died: 12 July 1996 (aged 75); Lahore, Punjab, Pakistan
- Batting: Right-handed
- Bowling: Right-arm
- Relatives: Feroz Nizami (brother); Mudassar Nazar (son); Mohammad Ilyas (nephew)

International information
- National side: Pakistan
- Test debut (cap 10): 16 October 1952 v India
- Last Test: 12 December 1952 v India

Career statistics
Competition	Test	First-class
Matches	5	45
Runs scored	277	2,739
Batting average	39.57	41.50
100s/50s	1/1	8/9
Top score	124*	175
Balls bowled	12	486
Wickets	0	5
Bowling average	–	51.00
5 wickets in innings	–	0
10 wickets in match	–	0
Best bowling	–	1/3
Catches/stumpings	7/–	40/–
- Source: ESPNcricinfo, 11 March 2019

Nazar Mohammad (5 March 1921 – 12 July 1996) was a Pakistani cricketer who played in five Test matches in 1952. He was educated at Islamia College, Lahore.

== Family ==
His brother Feroz Nizami was a famous music composer while his other brother Siraj Nizami was a writer specializing in Sufism.

His son Mudassar Nazar also represented Pakistan in cricket for many years in the 1970s and 1980s, and he was the uncle of Pakistani cricketer Mohammad Ilyas.

== Career ==
In October 1952, in Pakistan's second Test match and first Test victory, he became the first player to score a Test century for Pakistan, and the first player to remain on the ground for an entire Test match. An opening batsman, he carried his bat for his score of '124 not out' in Pakistan's total of 331 in an innings victory over India, batting for 8 hours 35 minutes.

Shortly after the series, he injured his arm, ending his career. According to Omar Noman, "as the famous story goes," Nazar sustained the injury jumping out from the house window of the renowned film actress and singer Noor Jehan when her film producer husband Shaukat Hussain Rizvi returned home unexpectedly and surprised them. There were persistent rumors in the local newspapers, at the time, of a romantic affair going on between Noor Jehan and Nazar Mohammad.

He was also a right-am bowler, with five first-class wickets to his name.
