= Deepak Shodhan =

Indian cricket player (1928–2016)

Personal information
- Full name: Roshan Harshadlal Shodhan
- Born: 18 October 1928; Ahmedabad, British India (now in Gujarat, India)
- Died: 16 May 2016 (aged 87); Ahmedabad, Gujarat
- Batting: Left-handed
- Bowling: Left-arm medium
- Role: Batsman

International information
- National side: India (1952–1953)
- Test debut (cap 68): 12 December, 1952 v Pakistan
- Last Test: 28 March, 1953 v West Indies

Domestic team information
- Years: Team
- 1946/47–1961/62: Gujarat
- 1957/58–1959/60): Baroda

Career statistics
Competition	Tests	First-class
Matches	3	43
Runs scored	181	1802
Batting average	60.33	31.61
100s/50s	1/0	4/7
Top score	110	261
Balls bowled	60	5,358
Wickets	0	73
Bowling average	–	34.05
5 wickets in innings	–	3
10 wickets in match	–	0
Best bowling	–	5/49
Catches/stumpings	1	27
- Source: ESPNcricinfo, 10 February 2021

Roshan Harshadlal "Deepak" Shodhan (18 October 1928 – 16 May 2016) was an Indian Test cricketer.

== Background ==
Shodhan was a left-handed batsman and occasional medium pace bowler. He was the second Indian batsman, after Lala Amarnath, to score a hundred on Test debut. He was selected against Pakistan on the weight of the 89* that he scored for West Zone against the Pakistanis earlier in the tour. Named as 12th man for the 1952 Calcutta test, he took the field after Vijay Hazare was unable to play. At Calcutta in a curious Indian innings where every batsman reached double figures, Shodhan scored 110 batting at No.8. In an interview Shodhan later reminisced about his hundred: "I was an attacking player myself. I relished the attacking field set by Pakistan. Even when the ninth wicket was lost, I managed to hit two consecutive boundaries to reach 100". He added 40 runs for the last wicket with Ghulam Ahmed.

Shodhan scored 45 and 11 in the first Test at Port of Spain against West Indies that followed. He missed the next three Tests, and when picked for the last match of the series he fell ill. He scored an important 15* in the second innings batting at No.10. That turned out to be his last Test as he was never again selected to play for India.

== Odd explanation ==
The exclusion of Shodhan from the Indian team thereafter has never been convincingly explained. It is sometimes attributed to the eccentricities of the selectors. In his book The Covers Are Off published in 2004, Rajan Bala interviewed the various people involved, and it seems to indicate that it was the animosity between Shodhan and Vinoo Mankad that ended his career. Mankad, a senior player in the side, was apparently not on good terms with Vijay Hazare who had captained India in the series in West Indies.

"There was a story doing the rounds that Mankad asked him (Shodhan) as to which side he was on – on his or Hazare's. And when Shodhan replied that he was on the Indian side, Mankad had the knives out for him". The West Indian tour was to be Hazare's last series and he was succeeded by Mankad.

Hazare once told Bala that he was "not aware of the exchange between him (Shodhan) and Vinoo, but I must say that Vinoo was not too keen that Deepak play. I suppose Vinoo found Deepak's attitude casual. ... (Shodhan) was not interested in touring (after the final Test of the series) ... Maybe it had to do with his business commitments. He had made himself unavailable for the tour of Pakistan and it might have been because Vinoo was the captain."

Shodhan also hinted at the same : "All I can tell you is that no youngster could hope to play for long at that time because he had to ally himself to one camp or the other. One had to know how to survive. What did I know about the politics? The captain Vijay Hazare was not a strong personality and the truth is, Vinoo Mankad was. He always had his way... I would have loved to play on. But then Hazare called quits and Mankad became captain. I made myself unavailable for the tour to Pakistan in 1954/55. It is unlikely that I would have been chosen".

== Highest record ==
Deepak Shodhan's 60.33 still remains the highest average in a completed career by an Indian batsman. He represented Gujarat for most of his Ranji career before switching to Baroda. As a youngster, he was a good hockey player. But being a left-hander he needed a specially made 'left-handed hockey stick' which dissuaded him.

== Death ==
Shodhan died at the age of 87 on 16 May 2016 at his Ahmedabad home after suffering from lung cancer, which was detected in February 2016. He was India's oldest former Test cricketer at time of his death.
