= Lucknow University Ground =

Former cricket ground in Lucknow, India

University Ground
- Interactive map of University Ground

Ground information
- Location: Lucknow, Uttar Pradesh, India
- Country: India
- Coordinates: 26.864068°N 80.935905°E
- Establishment: 1949
- Capacity: n/a
- Owner: University of Lucknow
- Operator: University of Lucknow

International information
- First Test: 23 October 1952: India v Pakistan
- As of 22 June 2014; Source: University Ground, Cricinfo

The University Ground was a test cricket stadium in Lucknow, India.

The first and the only international Test match was played on 23–26 October 1952 between India and Pakistan.

The stadium lies on the banks of the River Gomti. In 1994, the K.D. Singh Babu Stadium took its place as the city's premier cricket ground.

Now this ground is used by owner University of Lucknow as a multi-purpose stadium for university events and sports activities.

== Test Centuries ==
No.	Score	Player	Team	Inns.	Opposing team	Date	Result
1	124	Nazar Mohammad	Pakistan	2	India	23 October 1952	Won

== Test Five wicket Hauls ==
No.	Bowler	Date	Team	Opposing team	Inn	Overs	Runs	Wkts	Econ	Result
1	Fazal Mahmood	23 October 1952	Pakistan	India	1	24.1	52	5	2.15	Won
2	Fazal Mahmood	23 October 1952	Pakistan	India	3	27.3	42	7	1.52	Won

== See also ==
- List of Test cricket grounds
