= Habib Choudhury =

Indian cricket umpire (1916–1968)

Personal information
- Born: 20 July 1916
- Died: 1 July 1968 (aged 51); London, England

Umpiring information
- Tests umpired: 4 (1960–1964)
- Source: ESPNcricinfo, 3 July 2013

Habib Choudhury (20 July 1916 – 1 July 1968) was an Indian cricket umpire. He stood in four Test matches between 1960 and 1964.

== See also ==
- List of Test cricket umpires
