= Nana Joshi =

Indian cricketer

- Joshi in 1959

Personal information
- Full name: Padmanabh Govind Joshi
- Born: 7 October 1926; Baroda, British India (now in Gujarat, India)
- Died: 8 January 1987 (aged 60); Pune, Maharashtra, India
- Nickname: Nana
- Batting: Right-handed
- Role: Batsman, Wicket-keeper

International information
- National side: India
- Test debut (cap 53): 2 November 1951 v England
- Last Test: 2 December 1960 v Pakistan

Career statistics
Competition	Tests	First-class
Matches	12	78
Runs scored	207	1,710
Batting average	10.89	16.93
100s/50s	0/1	1/8
Top score	52*	100*
Balls bowled	0	6
Wickets	–	0
Bowling average	–	–
5 wickets in innings	–	0
10 wickets in match	–	0
Best bowling	-–	–
Catches/stumpings	18/9	120/61
- Source: ESPNcricinfo, 12 December 2020

Padmanabh Govind "Nana" Joshi (7 October 1926 – 8 January 1987) was an Indian cricketer who kept wicket for India in 12 Test matches between 1951 and 1960.

== Personal life ==
Joshi was born in Baroda, Gujarat, India in 1926. His father died when Joshi was eight. His mother brought him and his brother to Poona where she brought them up under great hardship. She maintained the family by sewing and providing food for students while Joshi used to clean the utensils and serve food. She supported Joshi until he completed his college education and got a job.

Joshi had his schooling at Bhave School and then went to S.P. Bhau college and Wadia College in Pune where he took a BA degree. He worked for Standard Vacuum and Hindustan Petroleum in Pune before dying from liver cancer in 1987.

== Cricket career ==
Joshi first gained attention as a cricketer in 1949-50 when he scored 100 not out for Central Province Governor's XI against the touring Commonwealth XI in addition to dismissing six batsmen. This earned him a place in two unofficial Tests against the same team. Joshi played cricket at a time when India had three or four wicket keepers of the same class. In a career that lasted for nearly ten years, he played only 12 Tests.

He made his Test debut against England in the first Test at Delhi in 1951–52. In the first innings, he caught two and brilliantly stumped two others, but his errors in the second innings helped England to save the match. Joshi was replaced by Madhav Mantri for the second Test, who in turn gave way to Probir Sen in the third. Joshi was picked for the fourth and then discarded in favour of Sen for the final Test. Here Sen stumped five batsmen and Joshi found himself out of the team to tour England in 1952.

Writing in 1985, N. S. Ramaswami remembered that Joshi "impressed as a dapper and neat performer. Between the overs he walked from wicket to wicket with a certain jauntiness. He seemed to wear the gloves as a lady might at a fashionable ball." Yet in his opinion, Joshi came lower down in the hierarchy of contemporary wicket keepers. Sen and Mantri occupied the top rung, Naren Tamhane came next, followed by Joshi.

Joshi played in three Tests in the tour of the West Indies in 1952–53 and three Tests in England in 1959. In a match in the Pune summer league in 1957–58, he had a hand in all ten dismissals in addition to scoring 68 out of 117 all out.

He was again selected for India against Pakistan for the Bombay Test of 1960–61. Here his career came to an abrupt end. In the fifth over of the first day, he dropped Hanif Mohammad off Ramakant Desai, 'a simple catch', when the batsman was 12. Hanif went on score 160. "If ever a catch marred or made a series", wrote Vijay Hazare, "it was this one." Later in the match he made his career best score of 52 not out and added 149 for ninth wicket with Ramakant Desai, five runs short of the world record at the time and still an Indian ninth-wicket record. But he never played another Test.

Joshi dismissed nine batsmen against Gujarat in 1959–60, equalling the then Indian record. He captained Maharashtra between 1960–61 and 1962–63. He also served on the Maharashtra cricket selection committee. His benefit match in Sangli in 1974 earned him 1,25,000 rupees.
