= Santosh Ganguli =

Indian cricketer (1911–1985)

Personal information
- Full name: Santosh Kumar Ganguli
- Born: 19 March 1911; Calcutta, British India
- Died: 26 December 1985 (aged 74); Calcutta (now Kolkata), India

Umpiring information
- Tests umpired: 10 (1956–1965)
- Source: Cricinfo, 6 July 2013

Santosh Ganguli (19 March 1911 – 26 December 1985) was an Indian cricket umpire. He stood in ten Test matches between 1956 and 1965. He umpired 35 matches of first-class cricket in India between 1945 and 1972.

Ganguli was also a first-class cricketer, playing eleven matches between 1938 and 1945, six of them for Bengal in the Ranji Trophy.

== See also ==
- List of Test cricket umpires
