= Jayasinghrao Ghorpade =

Indian cricketer (1930–1978)

Personal information
- Full name: Jaysinghrao Mansinghrao Ghorpade
- Born: 2 October 1930; Panchgani, British India
- Died: 29 March 1978 (aged 47); Vadodra, Gujarat, India
- Batting: Right-handed
- Bowling: Legbreak googly

International information
- National side: India
- Test debut (cap 70): 19 February 1953 v West Indies
- Last Test: 20 August 1959 v England

Career statistics
Competition	Test	First-class
Matches	8	82
Runs scored	229	2,631
Batting average	15.26	25.54
100s/50s	0/0	2/16
Top score	41	123
Balls bowled	150	3,515
Wickets	0	114
Bowling average	–	30.83
5 wickets in innings	–	4
10 wickets in match	–	0
Best bowling	–	6/19
Catches/stumpings	4/–	33/–
- Source: ESPNcricinfo, 20 November 2022

Jaysinghrao Mansinghrao Ghorpade (2 October 1930 – 29 March 1978) was an Indian cricketer who played in eight Test matches from 1953 to 1959.
