= Pakistani cricket team in India in 1960–61 =

International cricket tour

Pakistani cricket team in India in 1960-61
- Date: 2 December 1960 – 13 February 1961
- Location: India
- Result: 5-Test series drawn
Teams
- India: Pakistan
Captains
- Nari Contractor: Fazal Mahmood
Most runs
- Polly Umrigar (380) Chandu Borde (330) Nari Contractor (319): Saeed Ahmed (460); Hanif Mohammad (410); Imtiaz Ahmed (375)
Most wickets
- Ramakant Desai (21) Bapu Nadkarni (9) Subhash Gupte (8): Haseeb Ahsan (15); Mahmood Hussain (13); Fazal Mahmood (9)

The Pakistan national cricket team toured India in the winter of 1960–61. They played five Test matches against the India national cricket team, and also played against several local Indian squads.

== Background ==
Writing for The Indian Express cricketer Abdul Hafeez Kardar who played for both India and Pakistan maintained that if Pakistan "does well in the first two test matches", they would go on to win the series. He felt that the visiting side had the "strongest batting power house ever to be sent out" by Pakistan and that Hanif Mohammad, "the most matured opener of the game", would the main "hurdle" for India.

== Squads ==
India	Pakistan
Nari Contractor (c); Pankaj Roy; Abbas Ali Baig; Polly Umrigar; Bapu Nadkarni; Vijay Manjrekar; Chandu Borde; Subhash Gupte; Nana Joshi (wk); Rusi Surti; Ramakant Desai; M. L. Jaisimha; A. G. Milkha Singh; Indrajitsinhji; Ajit Wadekar; Naren Tamhane (wk); V. M. Muddiah; Salim Durani; Surendranath; Datta Gaekwad; Baloo Gupte; Budhi Kunderan; Vijay Mehra; Prakash Poddar; Vaman Kumar	Fazal Mahmood (c); Imtiaz Ahmed (wk); Hanif Mohammad; Wallis Mathias; Saeed Ahmed; Javed Burki; Mushtaq Mohammad; Mahmood Hussain; Mohammad Farooq; Nasim-ul-Ghani; Haseeb Ahsan; Zafar Altaf; Ijaz Butt; Shujauddin Butt; Mohammad Munaf; Intikhab Alam; Alimuddin

The Indian squad for the series was announced on 30 November 1960. Rajasthan's all-rounder Rusi Surti was the only new inclusion in the squad. Vijay Manjrekar and Subhash Gupte made their comeback to the squad after a year. It was reported that the Pakistan squad would be announced only an hour before commencement of the First Test. To their squad announced before the First test, Ijaz Butt, Shujauddin Butt, Mohammad Munaf and Intikhab Alam were added for the first-class game against Central Zone.

== Tour games ==
=== Three-day: Combined Universities v Pakistanis ===
18–20 November 1960
Scorecard

Pakistanis	v	Combined Universities
535/4d (110.3 overs); Hanif Mohammad 222; Peter Subramaniam 2/108 (19 overs)		327 (82.3 overs); Dilip Sardesai 87; Intikhab Alam 3/48 (10 overs)
119/3 (23 overs); Saeed Ahmed 42; Ajit Wadekar 1/3 (1 over)

Match drawn
Nehru Stadium, Pune
Umpires: Habib Choudhury and Sewaram Makhija

- Pakistanis won the toss and elected to bat.
- Dilip Sardesai made his debut, while Peter Subramaniam (both Combined Universities) played his only first-class match.
- Hanif Mohammad (Pakistanis) passed 8,000 runs in first-class matches.
- Mushtaq Mohammad (Pakistanis) scored his first century in first-class matches.

== Test series ==
=== 1st Test ===
2–7 December
Scorecard

Pakistan	v	India
350 (137.4 overs); Hanif Mohammad 160; Subhash Gupte 4/43 (31.0 overs)		449/9d (176.4 overs); Ramakant Desai 85; Mahmood Hussain 5/129 (51.4 overs)
166/4 (80 overs); Imtiaz Ahmed 69; Bapu Nadkarni 2/9 (15 overs)

Match drawn
Brabourne Stadium, Bombay
Umpires: Santosh Ganguli (Ind) and Bapu Joshi (Ind)

- Pakistan won the toss and elected to bat.
- Rusi Surti (Ind), and Javed Burki and Mohammad Farooq (Pak) made their Test debuts.
- Hanif Mohammad (Pak) passed 2,000 runs in Tests. His partnership of 246 runs for the second wicket with Saeed Ahmed was a record for Pakistan in Tests.
- Mahmood Hussain (Pak) claimed his 50th wicket in Tests.
- 5 December was a rest day.

Pakistan won the toss and elected to bat first on what was described as a pitch without the "usual grass" on it while staying "firm" and with "little dew".

=== 2nd Test ===
16–21 December
Scorecard

Pakistan	v	India
335 (188.4 overs); Javed Burki 79; Polly Umrigar 4/71 (55 overs)		404 (193.5 overs); Polly Umrigar 115; Haseeb Ahsan 5/121 (56 overs)
140/3 (64 overs); Javed Burki 48; V. M. Muddiah 2/40 (18 overs)

Match drawn
Modi Stadium, Kanpur
Umpires: Santosh Ganguli and Bapu Joshi

- Pakistan won the toss and elected to bat.
- 19 December was a rest day.

The Indian team selectors made changes to the squad following the First Test; wicket-keeper Naren Tamhane, V. M. Muddiah, Salim Durani were included in place of Pankaj Roy, Nana Joshi and Ajit Wadekar. The Pakistani side included Alimuddin.

=== 3rd Test ===
30 December–4 January
Scorecard

Pakistan	v	India
301 (127.2 overs); Mushtaq Mohammad 61; Chandu Borde 4/21 (16 overs)		180 (99.3 overs); Chandu Borde 44; Fazal Mahmood 5/26 (25.3 overs)
146/3d (49 overs); Hanif Mohammad 63; Ramakant Desai 1/37 (16.0 overs)		127/4 (57.0 overs); Vijay Manjrekar 45; Haseeb Ahsan 2/25 (14 overs)

Match drawn
Eden Gardens, Calcutta
Umpires: Santosh Ganguli and Badami Satyaji Rao

- Pakistan won the toss and elected to bat.
- 2 January was a rest day.
- Naren Tamhane (Ind) played his final Test.

Leading up to the Third Test, pacer Surendranath was included in the Indian squad while Pankaj Roy was dropped. Pakistan made one change in the team that played the Second Test; Intikhab Alam replaced Alimuddin. A "grassy wicket" aiding bowlers, both seamers and spinners, was expected before the game.

=== 4th Test ===
13–18 January
Scorecard

Pakistan	v	India
448/8d (182.5 overs); Imtiaz Ahmed 135; Ramakant Desai 4/66 (28.5 overs)		539/9d (227 overs); Chandu Borde 177; Haseeb Ahsan 6/202 (84 overs)
59/0 (18 overs); Saeed Ahmed 38; Nari Contractor 0/1 (1 over)

Match drawn
Corporation Stadium, Madras
Umpires: Sambhu Pan and S. K. Raghunatha Rao

- Pakistan won the toss and elected to bat.
- Baloo Gupte (Ind) made his Test debut.
- Pakistan's first innings total of 448 was their highest against India. India's total of 539 was their highest and the highest for an India-Pakistan Test.
- Polly Umrigar and Chandu Borde (Ind) broke the record for highest fifth partnership for India (177), surpassing Umrigar and Dattu Phadkar's 131-run stand in 1952–53.
- Chandu Borde (Ind) set a record for the highest individual score for a player in any India-Pakistan Test.
- Play was abandoned 20 minutes before scheduled time on day 4 after a section of the stands caught fire.

The Indian selectors included Datta Gaekwad and Baloo Gupte in place of Abbas Ali Baig, Bapu Nadkarni and Subhash Gupte after the Third Test. Further, following the first-class game between Pakistan and Indian Board President's XI, wicket-keeper Budhi Kunderan and Vijay Mehra were added to the squad. Showers were predicted on the day one of the Test following intermittent rains on the day preceding the game.

=== 5th Test ===
8–13 February
Scorecard

India	v	Pakistan
463 (158 overs); Polly Umrigar 112; Fazal Mahmood 3/86 (38 overs)		286 (125.5 overs); Mushtaq Mohammad 101; Vaman Kumar 5/64 (37.5 overs)
16/0 (2.0 overs); M. L. Jaisimha 14; Mahmood Hussain 0/7 (1 over)		250 (127.4 overs); Imtiaz Ahmed 53; Bapu Nadkarni 4/43 (52.4 overs)

Match drawn
Feroz Shah Kotla, Delhi
Umpires: I. Gopalakrishnan and S. K. Raghunatha Rao

- India won the toss and elected to bat.
- Vaman Kumar (Ind) made his Test debut.
- 10 February was a rest day.

In the Indian side that played the Fourth Test and the squad, Datta Gaekwad, Surendranath, Baloo Gupte and Naren Tamhane were replaced with Indrajitsinhji, Prakash Poddar, Bapu Nadkarni and Vaman Kumar for the Fifth.

== Broadcast ==
The series was aired on All India Radio for Indian listeners. For the Second Test the Maharajkumar of Vizianagram, Devraj Puri and V. K. Chakrapani served as commentators, while for the Fourth Test, the Maharaja was accompanied by Pearson Surita and P. Ananda Rau, and Pakistan's Omar Kureishi as the guest commentator.
