= Pakistani cricket team in England in 1962 =

International cricket tour

The Pakistan cricket team toured England in the 1962 season to play a five-match Test series against England. They also played a match in Ireland. The team is officially termed the Second Pakistanis as it was their second tour of England, following their inaugural tour in 1954. The Test series was the third between the two teams after those in England in 1954 and in Pakistan in 1961–62. Ted Dexter captained England in four Tests and Colin Cowdrey in one; Javed Burki captained Pakistan in all five Tests. England won the series 4–0 with one match drawn.

The Second Pakistanis played 36 matches in all, 29 of them rated first-class including the five Tests. They won only four of their first-class fixtures and lost eight, the other 17 matches being drawn. Their outstanding player on tour was Mushtaq Mohammad, who was selected as one of the Wisden Cricketers of the Year.

== Background ==
Pakistan were visiting England for the second time. Their first tour was in 1954 and it resulted in a 1–1 series draw, a highly creditable result for a team that was then new to Test cricket. In the meantime, Pakistan had largely held together the nucleus of the 1954 team but by 1962 it had become necessary to make several changes, with the result that the 1962 team was carrying too many inexperienced players. Wisden commented upon the recent development in Pakistani cricket of replacing matting pitches with "very dead turf pitches". The nature of such pitches is that they allow for little movement of the ball off a straight line of delivery and so create easy batting conditions which, consequently, inhibit development of the skills necessary to perform well on all sorts of pitch. As a result, most of the Pakistani batsmen had difficulty in English conditions against pace and seam where there is considerable deviation of the ball as it moves through the air. The 1962 Pakistanis suffered accordingly against the English pace bowlers as is shown by the series statistics in that 96 Pakistani wickets fell during the five matches and 73 were taken by pace or seam bowlers, only 21 by spinners and there were two run outs. Fred Trueman, England's main exponent of the "outswinger" took 22 wickets in only four Tests.

In England itself, the series against Pakistan was seemingly a secondary consideration. Playfair 1962 began its editorial with an apology to "the fine players of Pakistan" because everyone was supposedly looking ahead to the following winter's tour of Australia. The whole point of the editorial, indeed its title, was "Who will lead in Australia?" A year later, England having failed to regain The Ashes, Wisden commented that "the season of 1962 was spoiled to a large extent by rain and main interest centred on finding a team to go to Australia". Although the era of amateur status in first-class cricket was about to end, the three contenders for the leadership of England were all amateurs: Colin Cowdrey, Ted Dexter and David Sheppard. Dexter had just led England in its 1961–62 winter tour of the sub-continent and retained the captaincy for the tour of Australia.

The 1962 Test series followed the 1961–62 series in Pakistan that had ended on 7 February, 1962. England had moved on to Ceylon, playing three matches there till 18 February, and then home. In the 1961–62 Pakistan season, the Quaid-e-Azam Trophy ended on 3 January and was won by Karachi Blues, who beat Combined Services by 4 wickets. The Ayub Trophy ran from 16 March to 4 April when the final ended. It was won by Karachi, who beat North Zone by 316 runs. 24 days later, on 28 April, Pakistan began their 1962 tour of England at Arundel Castle Cricket Ground against the Duke of Norfolk's XI.

== Pakistan squad ==
Because of injuries, the Second Pakistanis used 21 players in their 29 first-class matches. The team was captained by Javed Burki with Hanif Mohammad as his vice-captain. The team manager was Brigadier R. G. ("Gussy") Haider with Major S. A. Rahman as his assistant. Squad details below state the player's 1961–62 club team, his age at the beginning of the tour, his batting hand and his type of bowling:

Batsmen
Name	Club	Birth date	Batting style	Bowling style	Ref
Alim-ud-Din	Karachi Blues	15 April 1928 (aged 34)	right-handed	none	
Hanif Mohammad	Karachi Whites	21 February 1934 (aged 28)	right-handed	right arm off break	
Javed Burki	Lahore	8 May 1938 (aged 23)	right-handed	right arm medium pace	
Mushtaq Mohammad	Karachi Whites	15 January 1943 (aged 19)	right-handed	right arm leg break and googly	
Saeed Ahmed	Pakistan International Airlines	1 October 1937 (aged 24)	right-handed	right arm off break	
Wallis Mathias	Karachi	4 February 1935 (aged 27)	right-handed	right arm medium pace	

Wicket-keepers
Name	Club	Birth date	Batting style	Bowling style	Ref
Asif Ahmed	Karachi	1 April 1942 (aged 20)	right-handed	none	
Ijaz Butt	Rawalpindi	10 March 1938 (aged 24)	right-handed	none	
Imtiaz Ahmed	Combined Services	5 January 1928 (aged 34)	right-handed	right arm off break	

All-rounders
Name	Club	Birth date	Batting style	Bowling style	Ref
Nasim-ul-Ghani	Karachi Whites	14 May 1941 (aged 20)	left-handed	left arm medium pace and slow left arm orthodox	
Shahid Mahmood	Karachi Blues	17 March 1939 (aged 23)	left-handed	left arm medium pace	
Shuja-ud-Din Butt	Bahawalpur	10 April 1930 (aged 32)	right-handed	slow left arm orthodox	

Bowlers
Name	Club	Birth date	Batting style	Bowling style	Ref
Afaq Hussain	Karachi University	31 December 1939 (aged 22)	right-handed	right arm off break	
Antao D'Souza	Pakistan International Airlines	17 January 1939 (aged 23)	right-handed	right arm medium pace and off break	
Fazal Mahmood	Lahore	18 February 1927 (aged 35)	right-handed	right arm fast medium	
Haseeb Ahsan	Pakistan International Airlines	15 July 1939 (aged 22)	right-handed	right arm off break	
Intikhab Alam	Karachi Whites	28 December 1941 (aged 20)	right-handed	right arm leg break and googly	
Javed Akhtar	Rawalpindi	21 November 1940 (aged 21)	right-handed	right arm off break	
Mahmood Hussain	Karachi Whites	2 April 1932 (aged 30)	right-handed	right arm fast medium	
Mohammad Farooq	Karachi	8 April 1938 (aged 24)	right-handed	right arm fast medium	
Munir Malik	Rawalpindi	10 July 1934 (aged 27)	right-handed	right arm fast medium	

Pakistan used seventeen players in the Test series. The four who did not play in the series were Afaq Hussain, who made six tour appearances; Asif Ahmed, who made nine; Haseeb Ashan, who sustained a foot injury in the second match and went home soon afterwards; and Shuja-ud-Din Butt, who was only accompanying the tour party but was needed to play against Hampshire as an emergency stand-in. Five players took part in all five Tests: Hanif Mohammad, Javed Burki, Mushtaq Mohammad, Nasim-ul-Ghani and Saeed Ahmed. The squad included two non-Muslim players, Mathias and D'Souza.

== England Test selections ==
England selected a total of 19 players in the five Tests. Only two players (Ted Dexter and Peter Parfitt) played in all five matches. Details of each England player includes the county club he represented in 1962 (Note: Several England players also represented Marylebone Cricket Club (MCC) and/or took part in Gentlemen v Players.), his age at the beginning of the season, his batting hand and his style of bowling:

Batsmen
Name	Club	Birth date	Batting style	Bowling style	Ref
Ken Barrington	Surrey	24 November 1930 (aged 31)	right-handed	right arm leg break and googly	
Colin Cowdrey	Kent	24 December 1932 (aged 29)	right-handed	none	
Ted Dexter	Sussex	15 May 1935 (aged 26)	right-handed	right arm medium pace	
Tom Graveney	Worcestershire	16 June 1927 (aged 34)	right-handed	none	
Peter Parfitt	Middlesex	8 December 1936 (aged 25)	left-handed	right arm medium pace	
Geoff Pullar	Lancashire	1 August 1935 (aged 26)	left-handed	none	
David Sheppard	Sussex	6 March 1929 (aged 33)	right-handed	slow left arm orthodox	
Micky Stewart	Surrey	16 September 1932 (aged 29)	right-handed	none	

All-rounders
Name	Club	Birth date	Batting style	Bowling style	Ref
Ray Illingworth	Yorkshire	8 June 1932 (aged 29)	right-handed	right arm off break	
Barry Knight	Essex	18 February 1938 (aged 24)	right-handed	right arm fast medium	
Fred Titmus	Surrey	24 November 1932 (aged 29)	right-handed	right arm off break	

Wicketkeepers
Name	Club	Birth date	Batting style	Bowling style	Ref
Geoff Millman	Nottinghamshire	2 October 1934 (aged 27)	right-handed	none	
John Murray	Middlesex	1 April 1935 (aged 27)	right-handed	none	

Bowlers
Name	Club	Birth date	Batting style	Bowling style	Ref
David Allen	Gloucestershire	29 October 1935 (aged 26)	right-handed	right arm off break	
Len Coldwell	Worcestershire	10 January 1933 (aged 29)	right-handed	right arm fast medium	
David Larter	Northamptonshire	24 April 1940 (aged 22)	right-handed	right arm fast	
Tony Lock	Surrey	5 July 1929 (aged 32)	right-handed	slow left arm orthodox	
Brian Statham	Lancashire	17 June 1930 (aged 31)	left-handed	right arm fast	
Fred Trueman	Yorkshire	6 February 1931 (aged 31)	right-handed	right arm fast	

== Tour itinerary ==
The following is a list of the 36 matches played by the Second Pakistanis. 29 are rated as first-class fixtures. Test matches are listed in bold. The matches in italics were not first-class. (Note: In 1962, all first-class matches apart from Test matches were of three days' duration and were all played either Wednesday to Friday or Saturday to Tuesday with no Sunday play. The five-day Test matches were played Thursday to Tuesday with no Sunday play.)

Date	Match title	Venue	Result	Source
28 April	Duke of Norfolk's XI v Pakistanis	Arundel Castle Cricket Ground, Arundel	match drawn	
29 April	Indian Gymkhana v Pakistanis	Indian Gymkhana Cricket Club Ground, Osterley	match drawn	
30 April	Col. L. C. Stevens' XI v Pakistanis	The Saffrons, Eastbourne	Pakistanis won by 9 wickets	
2–4 May	Worcestershire v Pakistanis	New Road, Worcester	match drawn	
7–8 May	Club Cricket Conference v Pakistanis	Ealing Cricket Club Ground, Ealing	Pakistanis won by 7 wickets	
9–11 May	Oxford University v Pakistanis	The Parks, Oxford	Pakistanis won by an innings and 103 runs	
12–15 May	Leicestershire v Pakistanis	Grace Road, Leicester	match drawn	
16–18 May	Cambridge University v Pakistanis	Fenner's, Cambridge	Pakistanis won by 8 wickets	
19–22 May	Marylebone Cricket Club (MCC) v Pakistanis	Lord's, London	match drawn	
23–25 May	Sussex v Pakistanis	County Ground, Hove	Sussex won by 7 wickets	
26–29 May	Lancashire v Pakistanis	Old Trafford, Manchester	match drawn	
**31 May – 4 June**	**England v Pakistan**	**Edgbaston, Birmingham**	**England won by an innings and 24 runs**	
6–8 June	Surrey v Pakistanis	The Oval, London	Pakistanis won by 92 runs	
9–12 June	Glamorgan v Pakistanis	Sophia Gardens, Cardiff	Glamorgan won by 7 wickets	
13–14 June	Somerset v Pakistanis	County Ground, Taunton	Somerset won by an innings and 86 runs	
16–19 June	Yorkshire v Pakistanis	Park Avenue, Bradford	match drawn	
**21–23 June**	**England v Pakistan**	**Lord's, London**	**England won by 9 wickets**	
27–29 June	Northamptonshire v Pakistanis	County Ground, Northampton	match drawn	
30 June – 3 July	Nottinghamshire v Pakistanis	Trent Bridge, Nottingham	match drawn	
**5–7 July**	**England v Pakistan**	**Headingley, Leeds**	**England won by an innings and 117 runs**	
11–13 July	Lancashire v Pakistanis	Old Trafford, Manchester	match drawn	
14–17 July	Derbyshire v Pakistanis	Ind Coope Ground, Burton upon Trent	match drawn	
18–20 July	Hampshire v Pakistanis	Dean Park, Bournemouth	match drawn	
21–24 July	Sussex v Pakistanis	Lord's, London	match drawn	
**26–31 July**	**England v Pakistan**	**Trent Bridge, Nottingham**	**match drawn**	
1–2 August	Ireland v Pakistanis	College Park, Dublin	match drawn	
4–7 August	Glamorgan v Pakistanis	St Helen's, Swansea	match drawn	
8–10 August	Warwickshire v Pakistanis	Edgbaston, Birmingham	match drawn	
11–14 August	Gloucestershire v Pakistanis	College Ground, Cheltenham	match drawn	
**16–20 August**	**England v Pakistan**	**The Oval, London**	**England won by 10 wickets**	
22–24 August	Kent v Pakistanis	St Lawrence Ground, Canterbury	match drawn	
25–28 August	Essex v Pakistanis	Leyton Cricket Ground, Leyton	Essex won by 9 wickets	
29–30 August	Minor Counties v Pakistanis	Recreation Ground, Torquay	match drawn	
1–4 September	A. E. R. Gilligan's XI v Pakistanis	Central Recreation Ground, Hastings	match drawn	
5–7 September	T. N. Pearce's XI v Pakistanis	North Marine Road Ground, Scarborough	Pakistanis won by 5 wickets	
8–10 September	Durham v Pakistanis (Note: The match against Durham is not considered first-class as Durham in 1962 was a member of the Minor Counties Championship and did not acquire first-class status until 1992.)	Ashbrooke Sports Ground, Sunderland	match drawn	

== Test series ==
England and Pakistan played five Tests between May and August. England won the series 4–0 with one match drawn:

- 1st Test at Edgbaston – England won by an innings and 24 runs
- 2nd Test at Lord's – England won by 9 wickets
- 3rd Test at Headingley – England won by an innings and 117 runs
- 4th Test at Trent Bridge – match drawn
- 5th Test at The Oval – England won by 10 wickets

=== First Test ===
31 May – 4 June 1962
match scorecard

England	v	Pakistan
544–5 declared (146 overs); M. C. Cowdrey 159; P. H. Parfitt 101*; Intikhab Alam 2/117 (25 overs)		246 (101 overs); Mushtaq Mohammad 63; J. B. Statham 4/54 (21 overs)
		274 (123 overs); Saeed Ahmed 65; D. A. Allen 3/73 (36 overs)

England won by an innings and 24 runs
Edgbaston, Birmingham
Umpires: J. S. Buller, C. S. Elliott

- England won the toss and decided to bat
- 5-day match ending in 4

England, captained by Ted Dexter, selected Colin Cowdrey as an opening batsman alongside Geoff Pullar; Cowdrey normally batted at three or four in the order. The team consisted of six specialist batsmen, wicket-keeper Geoff Millman, two spinners and two pace bowlers, supplemented by Dexter as a third seamer. Pakistan, captained by Javed Burki, selected seven batsman, including the keeper Imtiaz Ahmed. They surprisingly omitted Mohammad Farooq and left themselves with one pace bowler, Mahmood Hussain. Their other three bowlers were seamer Antao D'Souza, leg spinner Intikhab Alam and all-rounder Nasim-ul-Ghani who bowled a mixture of left arm seam and orthodox spin.

Dexter won the toss, for only the second time in nine Tests as captain, and chose to bat first. England promptly established a pattern for the whole series by accumulating a large score. Cowdrey and Peter Parfitt made centuries, Tom Graveney 97, David Allen 79 not out and Dexter 72. Parfitt's century was his second in successive innings against Pakistan, following 111 at Karachi in February. All four Pakistan bowlers conceded 100-plus runs. Wisden commented on the "tremendous amount of work" that fell on Mahmood and D'Souza, given that the two slower bowlers were "terribly expensive". England declared during lunch on the second day (Friday) at 544 for 5. Playfair noted that Imtiaz Ahmed, Pakistan's wicket-keeper, did not concede a single bye in this large total. Playfair also recorded that there was a short delay before lunch on the first day, caused by the arrival of a mouse in the centre of the field.

Apart from Mushtaq Mohammad, who made 63, none of the Pakistani batsmen reached a half-century and they were all out for 246 shortly before lunch on Saturday. With a deficit of 298, Dexter enforced the follow-on. Pakistan in their second innings made a better start with Hanif Mohammad and Ijaz Butt putting on 60 for the first wicket. Even so, four wickets fell before close of play and Pakistan went into the rest day on 158 for four, still 140 in arrears. On the fourth day (Monday), Brian Statham took two quick wickets and Pakistan's fate was sealed despite resistance by Saeed Ahmed, who scored 65. England's bowlers shared the wickets: Statham took six in the match, Allen and Tony Lock five each and Fred Trueman four. The match ended on Monday afternoon, Pakistan all out for 274 and England winning by an innings and 24 runs.

=== Second Test ===
21 – 23 June 1962
match scorecard

Pakistan	v	England
100 (42.4 overs); Nasim-ul-Ghani 17; F. S. Trueman 6/31 (17.4 overs)		370 (101.4 overs); T. W. Graveney 153; Mohammad Farooq 4/70 (19 overs)
355 (119.3 overs); Javed Burki 101; Nasim-ul-Ghani 101; L. J. Coldwell 6/85 (41 overs)		86–1 (17 overs); M. J. Stewart 34*, E. R. Dexter 32*; A. D'Souza 1/29 (7 overs)

England won by 9 wickets
Lord's, London
Umpires: J. S. Buller, N. Oldfield

- Pakistan won the toss and decided to bat
- 5-day match ending in 3

England announced an unchanged team but, in the run-up to the match, the two Lancashire players Pullar and Statham were injured and had to withdraw. Their replacements were opening batsman Micky Stewart and fast-medium bowler Len Coldwell, who both earned their first Test cap. Pakistan brought Farooq into the team this time, replacing Intikhab, and preferred the veteran batsman Alim-ud-Din as opener to Butt. As in the first Test, Dexter and Burki were the team captains.

Burki won a toss he "would probably have preferred to lose". The conditions did not favour batting as there was heavy cloud and a "green" pitch. Nevertheless, Burki was uneasy about batting last and decided to bat first. They found Trueman almost unplayable and collapsed to 76 for six at lunch. They were all out within an hour of the resumption for exactly 100. Trueman, who took full advantage of the conditions, claimed six wickets for 31 and Coldwell, who provided good support on his debut, three for 25. Pakistan's best score was 17 by Nasim. As Wisden pointed out, Pakistan's undoing once again was their unpreparedness for the ball that "swings and lifts". England took the lead without undue difficulty, largely thanks to a quick 65 by Dexter, and ended the first day on 176 for four.

On the second day (Friday), Graveney "batted beautifully", especially his cover driving, to score 153 despite receiving minimal help from his partners except Trueman, with whom he added 76 for the ninth wicket. Farooq was Pakistan's best bowler but he injured his ankle during the second day and could not bowl after that. Pakistan began the third innings of the match with a deficit of 270 and were soon reduced to 77 for four, leaving Burki and Nasim together at close of play.

Most people expected an early finish on the Saturday but Burki and Nasim rallied and added 197 runs for the fifth wicket. At the time, it was a fifth wicket record for Pakistan in all Test cricket and their record stand for any wicket against England. Both batsmen scored 101. It was Nasim's first century and Burki's third against England in five matches. Pakistan were all out soon after tea for 370, leaving England to score 86 to win. Coldwell took six for 85 and finished his debut with nine wickets in the match, Trueman also taking nine. With ninety minutes left on the third day, England reached their target before the close for the loss of only Cowdrey's wicket.

=== Third Test ===
5 – 7 July 1962
match scorecard

England	v	Pakistan
428 (132 overs); P. H. Parfitt 119, M. J. Stewart 86; Munir Malik 5/128 (49 overs)		131 (65.1 overs); Alim-ud-Din 50; E. R. Dexter 4/10 (9.1 overs)
		180 (74.4 overs); Alim-ud-Din 60, Saeed Ahmed 54; J. B. Statham 4/50 (20 overs)

England won by an innings and 117 runs
Headingley, Leeds
Umpires: John Langridge, W. E. Phillipson

- Pakistan won the toss and decided to field
- 5-day match ending in 3

Brian Statham was fit again and, despite his good performance at Lord's, Coldwell had to give way. England also recalled John Murray, replacing Geoff Millman as the keeper, and preferred Fred Titmus to Tony Lock who was expensive during the Burki-Nasim stand at Lord's. Pakistan, whose injury problems were beginning to mount up, made three changes because Imtiaz, Wallis Mathias and D'Souza could not play. Their replacements were Butt, who had played at Edgbaston but not at Lord's, fast-medium bowler Munir Malik and off-spinner Javed Akhtar who had literally just arrived from Pakistan, having been called up as a reinforcement. With the winter tour still more on the minds of the England selectors than anything else, they decided to let Cowdrey captain the team in this match. Javed Burki captained Pakistan as in the two previous Tests.

Burki won the toss and asked England to bat first, the first time a Pakistan captain had ever taken that option in Test cricket. Burki had assessed the conditions well because there was a heavy sky and a "green" pitch to help his seamers Mahmood, Farooq and Munir. England struggled on the first day, reduced to just over four hours by rain, and were 194 for six at the close with Parfitt and Murray the not out batsmen. Wisden said that it was Pakistan's "best day of the tour so far".

On the second day (Friday), England took charge again and Parfitt completed his third century in four Tests against Pakistan. Allen scored 62 and there were useful scores by Trueman and Statham as the "tail wagged". Pakistan's injury problem reached crisis point as both Mahmood and Farooq broke down and neither played again on the tour. Munir, left as the sole pace and seam bowler, was overworked and deservedly captured five wickets. Wisden questioned Burki's captaincy in the situation. England were all out before tea for 428, a much higher score than expected after their struggle on Thursday. Hanif had a hand injury so Alim was restored to his old job of opening the innings with Butt. Pakistan reached 73 for three at the close, losing the wickets of Butt, Saeed and Mushtaq.

There was a complete collapse on Saturday morning with only Alim, who scored 50, playing with any confidence. Pakistan were all out for 131 and Cowdrey enforced the follow-on. England's best bowler was Dexter, nominally the third seamer, who took four for 10. Titmus, who bowled only four overs, took two for 3, including the key wicket of Alim. Alim again played well in the second innings but his only support came from Saeed. They both made half-centuries but the rest of the team were dismissed cheaply and they were all out for 180, Statham taking four for 50. As at Lord's, the match was completed in three days and England had won the series, three up and two to go.

=== Fourth Test ===
26 – 31 July 1962
match scorecard

England	v	Pakistan
428–5 declared (136.2 overs); T. W. Graveney 114, P. H. Parfitt 101*; Fazal Mahmood 3/130 (60 overs)		219 (86.1 overs); Mushtaq Mohammad 55, Saeed Ahmed 43; B. R. Knight 4/38 (17 overs)
		216–6 (101 overs); Mushtaq Mohammad 100*, Saeed Ahmed 64; J. B. Statham 2/47 (22 overs)

match drawn
Trent Bridge, Nottingham
Umpires: F. S. Lee, W. E. Phillipson

- Pakistan won the toss and decided to field
- 5-day match; 10.5 hours lost due to rain

Ted Dexter was restored to the captaincy but it is not known if this would have happened anyway or if it was because Colin Cowdrey was unfit and could not play. Whichever, Dexter now held the England captaincy for the next two years until the end of the 1964 season. England having won the series, the selectors decided to make changes to help them decide who should go on the winter tour. Geoff Pullar, fit again, was recalled and his opening partner was the third tour captaincy candidate David Sheppard, who had recently revived his cricket career at Sussex. They replaced Cowdrey and Stewart. Tony Lock was brought back in place of Allen and all-rounder Barry Knight came in as an extra bowler, replacing the out-of-form Kenny Barrington. Pakistan's dire injury troubles necessitated changes in their lineup. They had flown their old master bowler Fazal Mahmood out as a reinforcement. Imtiaz was fit again, Intikhab was recalled and Shahid Mahmood was introduced, making his Test debut as opening batsman. They replaced Mahmood, Farooq, Butt and Akhtar.

Burki repeated his tactic at Leeds by putting England in to bat after winning the toss. At that time, the pitch was "green" and the sky overcast so Burki hoped that Fazal and Munir would benefit from the conditions. Unfortunately, heavy rain began before play could start and the entire day was lost. Play began promptly on Friday morning when the conditions were better for batting, so Pakistan really were not having much luck. After Pullar was soon out, the Sussex pairing of Sheppard and Dexter added 161 for the second wicket. Significantly for the winter tour, Dexter batted brilliantly but Sheppard was struggling to find his touch. Both were out within a few minutes of each other and Graveney was joined by Parfitt. They shared a partnership of 184 for the fourth wicket which ended when Graveney was dismissed for 114, his fourth century of the summer against the Pakistanis. The innings ended just before lunch on Saturday when a heavy shower began with Parfitt close to his century. He faced one more ball with heavy rain falling and managed to reach 101 not out. Dexter promptly declared at 428 for five. It was Parfitt's fifth century of the summer against the Pakistanis (he had just scored two in one match against them for Middlesex) and his sixth in seven innings including the one in Karachi.

Pakistan's batsmen struggled again, Hanif being dismissed by Trueman off only the second ball of the innings, and they were 127 for six at the close on Saturday. Only Mushtaq and Saeed could offer any resistance. Nasim made 41 on Monday morning and almost saved the follow-on but they were all out for 219, 209 behind. In the second innings, Hanif was again dismissed quickly and Pakistan were 11 for one at close of play on Monday. As the final day got under way, another collapse looked inevitable until Mushtaq and Saeed held England at bay with a stand of 107 for the fourth wicket. With 65 minutes to go on Tuesday evening, Pakistan with five wickets left needed 22 runs more to avoid the innings defeat, Mushtaq and Shahid batting. There was then a dramatic over bowled by Trueman which could have won the game for England. First, Mushtaq was missed by substitute fielder Cyril Poole at long leg and then Shahid, who had not scored, was dropped by Titmus at slip. Pakistan batted on and Mushtaq completed a deserved century just before the close, scoring exactly 100 not out. It was his second Test century and he became the first player in Test history to achieve a second century before the age of 20. Pakistan ended on 216 for six, a lead of just seven runs, and the match was drawn.

=== Fifth Test ===
16 – 20 August 1962
match scorecard

England	v	Pakistan
480–5 declared (140 overs); M. C. Cowdrey 182, E. R. Dexter 172; A. D'Souza 2/116 (42 overs)		183 (97 overs); Imtiaz Ahmed 49, Hanif Mohammad 46; J. D. F. Larter 5/75 (25 overs)
27–0 (8.3 overs); J. T. Murray 14*		323 (111.1 overs); Imtiaz Ahmed 98, Mushtaq Mohammad 72; J. D. F. Larter 4/88 (21.1 overs)

England won by 10 wickets
The Oval, London
Umpires: F. S. Lee, C. S. Elliott

- England won the toss and decided to bat
- 5-day match ending in 4

For a match of academic interest, England made six changes. Pullar was unfit and they left out Graveney, Lock, Statham, Titmus and Trueman in order to give a chance to other tour contenders and, it was said, "to avoid calling too heavily on the counties (i.e., Surrey, Warwickshire, Worcestershire and Yorkshire) engaged in the fight for the County Championship". This latter reason was an odd one because while they allowed Trueman to play for Yorkshire, they selected Ray Illingworth; while they allowed Graveney to play for Worcestershire, they recalled Coldwell; while they allowed Lock to play for Surrey, they recalled Barrington; and they did not pick anyone from Warwickshire. The Championship ended with Yorkshire narrowly ahead of Worcestershire, the other two losing ground in the last week of August. Besides Barrington, Coldwell and Illingworth, England brought back Allen and Cowdrey and gave a first cap to pace bowler David Larter. Pakistan's team changed again with Butt and Imtiaz opening the innings. Hanif batted at number six and Shahid was left out. Alim was injured and replaced by Mathias. D'Souza was recalled in place of Munir.

The selection of Illingworth for this match was ironic in one sense. All through the summer, there had been speculation about which of Cowdrey, Dexter or Sheppard (amateurs all) would lead England in Australia to try and recover The Ashes. In the final Test against Pakistan, they occupied the first three positions in the England batting order. England failed to recover The Ashes on the 1962–63 tour and it was not until the 1970–71 tour that they finally succeeded, under the leadership of the professional Ray Illingworth.

Dexter won the toss and decided to bat first. Following a slow start by Sheppard and Cowdrey, the run rate accelerated in the afternoon via a second wicket partnership of 248 between Cowdrey and Dexter. Cowdrey made his highest Test score of 182 in this innings and Dexter scored 172. Barrington, who had surprisingly scored few runs in the series so far, made an unbeaten half-century. England declared at 480 for five and Pakistan again struggled against pace and seam. Imtiaz, Mushtaq and Hanif all scored 40-plus but then got out. Dexter wisely decided to use the giant Larter in short bursts and he claimed nine wickets in his debut Test (just as Coldwell had done in his debut at Lord's). Pakistan were all out in their first innings for only 183 and, on Saturday morning, were asked to follow on. Imtiaz played a fine innings on Saturday but, sadly, was out only two short of a century. Mushtaq, Burki and Mathias all put up resistance but Pakistan were 289 for six at the close and, after Mathias was run out in the first over on Monday, the end soon came. England won by an innings with well over a day to spare.

== Other matches ==
As well as their injury problems, the Pakistanis were frequently dogged by bad weather and most of their 17 drawn matches on the tour were because of rain, including the fourth Test as described above. The tour began at Arundel on Saturday, 28 April with the first of three one-day games (not limited overs). The first two were drawn and the Pakistanis won the third one against Colonel Stevens' XI. These three matches were, in effect, warm-ups only and not first-class.

The opening first-class fixture was against Worcestershire at New Road, starting on Wednesday, 2 May. The Pakistanis were given a foretaste of the Test series to come in that Tom Graveney scored a century for the home team (and was presented with his county cap immediately afterwards) and their batsmen struggled against the pace and seam of Jack Flavell and Len Coldwell.

== Aftermath ==
Shuja-ud-Din Butt, who had accompanied the tour in a non-playing capacity but was nevertheless needed to play against Hampshire because of the injury situation, became a cricket writer in later life and he summarised the 1962 tour as "the lowest and most depressing point in the history of Pakistan cricket". It was not until 1987 that Pakistan were granted a five-Test series in England again; on their five tours between 1962 and 1987, they played three Tests in each series and were co-visitors along with either India or New Zealand.

== See also ==
- 1962 English cricket season

== Bibliography ==
- Barclays (1986). Swanton, E. W. (ed.). Barclays World of Cricket. Willow Books. ISBN 0-00-218193-2.
- Playfair. Ross, Gordon (ed.). Playfair Cricket Annual (15th edition) (1962 ed.). London: Playfair Books Ltd.
- Playfair. Ross, Gordon (ed.). Playfair Cricket Annual (16th edition) (1963 ed.). London: The Dickens Press.
- Wisden. Preston, Norman (ed.). Wisden Cricketers' Almanack, 100th edition (1963 ed.). London: Sporting Handbooks Ltd.
