= List of international cricket five-wicket hauls by Richie Benaud =

Former Australian captain, Richie Benaud.

In cricket, a five-wicket haul (also known as a "five–for" or "fifer") refers to a bowler taking five or more wickets in a single innings. This is regarded as a notable achievement, and as of October 2024, only 54 bowlers have taken 15 or more five-wicket hauls at international level in their cricketing careers. Richie Benaud, a leg spinner and former captain of the Australia cricket team, played 63 Tests for his country between 1952 and 1964. He took 248 wickets at an average of 27.03, including 16 five-wicket hauls. The cricket almanack Wisden named him one of their Cricketers of the Year in 1962. He was inducted into the Australian Cricket Hall of Fame in 2007, and into the ICC Cricket Hall of Fame as one of the inaugural members in January 2009. Leo McKinstry, a cricket writer, in 1998 described Benaud as "one of cricket's greatest legends" and "one of the great all-rounders", and further noted him being the first to take 200 wickets and make 2,000 runs in Tests.

Benaud made his Test debut in January 1952 against the West Indies at the Sydney Cricket Ground, a match Australia won by 202 runs. His first Test five-wicket haul came in the first match of the 1956–57 series against India at the Corporation Stadium. (Note: The Corporation Stadium has since been renamed as Jawaharlal Nehru Stadium.) He took 7 wickets for 72 runs in the first innings of the match, his best bowling figures for an innings. Benaud took his solitary pair of five-wicket hauls in the third Test of the series at the Eden Gardens. He accumulated 11 wickets for 105 runs in the match, his career-best performance in Test cricket. Benaud claimed his 16 five-wicket hauls against five different opponents, and Australia never lost any of the games on such instances. He was most successful against India and South Africa, taking 5 five-wicket hauls against each side. Benaud took his five-wicket hauls at 12 cricket grounds, including 11 at venues outside Australia. As of August 2014, he is thirty-first among all-time combined five-wicket haul takers. (Note: Benaud shares the position with Terry Alderman, B. S. Chandrasekhar, Shoaib Akhtar, Graham McKenzie, Bob Willis and Chaminda Vaas.)

== Key ==
Symbol	Meaning
Date	Date the match was held, or starting date of the match for Test matches
Inn	The innings of the match in which the five-wicket haul was taken
Overs	Number of overs bowled in that innings
Runs	Runs conceded
Wkts	Number of wickets taken
Batsmen	The batsmen whose wickets were taken in the five-wicket haul
Econ	Bowling economy rate (average runs per over)
Result	The result for Australia in that match
*	One of two five-wicket hauls by Benaud in a match
†	10 wickets or more taken in the match
‡	Benaud captained Australia
Drawn	The match was drawn

== Test five-wicket hauls ==
Five-wicket hauls in Test cricket by Richie Benaud
No.	Date	Ground	Against	Inn	Overs	Runs	Wkts	Econ	Batsmen	Result
1	19 October 1956	Corporation Stadium, Madras (Note: Madras has since been renamed as Chennai.)	India	1	29.3	72	7	2.44	Vinoo Mankad; Pankaj Roy; Polly Umrigar; Vijay Manjrekar; Jasu Patel; Ghulam Ahmed; Subhash Gupte	Won
2	2 November 1956*†	Eden Gardens, Calcutta (Note: Calcutta has since been renamed as Kolkata.)	India	2	29	52	6	1.79	Nari Contractor; Vijay Manjrekar; Vinoo Mankad; Gulabrai Ramchand; A. G. Kripal Singh; Naren Tamhane	Won
3	2 November 1956*†	Eden Gardens, Calcutta	India	4	24.2	53	5	2.17	Polly Umrigar; Vijay Manjrekar; Vinoo Mankad; AG Kripal Singh; Naren Tamhane	Won
4	31 December 1957	Newlands Cricket Ground, Cape Town	South Africa	3	21 (Note: Eight-ball overs were bowled in this match.)	49	5	1.75	Dick Westcott; Roy McLean; Russell Endean; Ken Funston; Clive van Ryneveld	Won
5	24 January 1958	Kingsmead Cricket Ground, Durban	South Africa	2	50.7	114	5	1.68	Russell Endean; Roy McLean; Hugh Tayfield; Peter Heine; Neil Adcock	Drawn
6	7 February 1958	New Wanderers Stadium, Johannesburg	South Africa	3	41	84	5	1.53	Jackie McGlew; Russell Endean; Trevor Goddard; John Waite; Peter Heine	Won
7	28 February 1958	Crusaders Ground St George's Park, Port Elizabeth	South Africa	3	33	82	5	1.86	Trevor Goddard; Clive van Ryneveld; Jackie McGlew; Peter Carlstein; Peter Heine	Won
8	9 January 1959‡	Sydney Cricket Ground, Sydney	England	1	33.4	83	5	1.85	Tom Graveney; Colin Cowdrey; Roy Swetman; Fred Trueman; Jim Laker	Drawn
9	30 January 1959‡	Adelaide Oval, Adelaide	England	2	27	91	5	2.52	Peter May; Fred Trueman; Tony Lock; Frank Tyson; Godfrey Evans	Won
10	4 December 1959‡	National Stadium, Karachi	Pakistan	1	49.5	93	5	1.86	Shujauddin Butt; Duncan Sharpe; Ijaz Butt; Fazal Mahmood; Munir Malik	Drawn
11	12 December 1959‡	Feroz Shah Kotla Ground, Delhi	India	3	46	76	5	1.65	Nari Contractor; Chandu Borde; Bapu Nadkarni; Surendranath; Ramakant Desai	Won
12	13 January 1960‡	Corporation Stadium, Madras	India	2	32.1	43	5	1.33	Budhi Kunderan; Nari Contractor; Gulabrai Ramchand; Bapu Nadkarni; Ramakant Desai	Won
13	27 January 1961‡	Adelaide Oval, Adelaide	West Indies	1	27	96	5	2.66	Cammie Smith; Rohan Kanhai; Garfield Sobers; Joe Solomon; Wes Hall	Drawn
14	27 July 1961‡	Old Trafford Cricket Ground, Manchester	England	4	32	70	6	2.18	Raman Subba Row; Ted Dexter; Peter May; Brian Close; John Murray; David Allen	Won
15	23 November 1962‡	The Gabba, Brisbane	England	2	42	115	6	2.05	Geoff Pullar; David Sheppard; Ted Dexter; Ken Barrington; Peter Parfitt; Fred Titmus	Drawn
16	6 December 1963‡	The Gabba, Brisbane	South Africa	2	33	68	5	1.54	Trevor Goddard; Eddie Barlow; Peter Carlstein; Denis Lindsay; Peter Pollock	Drawn
