= List of India cricketers who have taken five-wicket hauls on Test debut =

List of cricketers

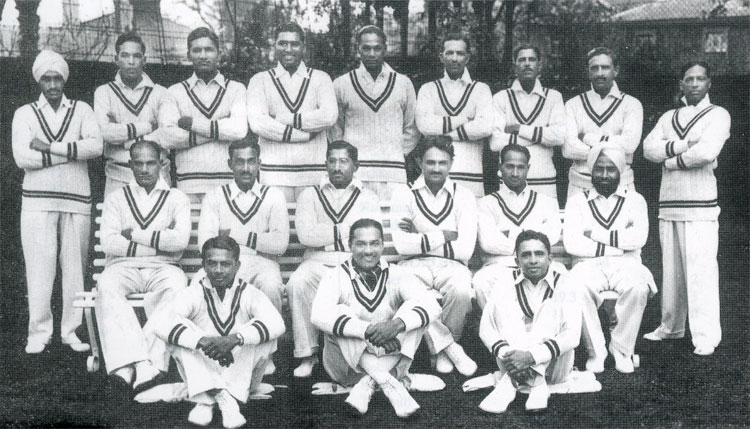
The Indian Test team that toured England in 1932

In cricket, a five-wicket haul (also known as a "five–for" or "fifer") refers to a bowler taking five or more wickets in a single innings. A five-wicket haul on debut is regarded by critics as a notable achievement. As of November 2026, 181 cricketers have taken a five-wicket haul on Test match debut, out of which ten are from the India national cricket team. The five-wicket hauls were taken against four different opponents – three each against Australia and West Indies, twice against England, and once against Afghanistan and Pakistan. The ten occasions have resulted in six wins, two losses and two draws. The five-wicket hauls were taken at eight different venues, six in India, three of which were taken at the M. A. Chidambaram Stadium, Chennai.

The first Indian to take a five-wicket haul was Mohammad Nissar who took 5 wickets for 93 runs during India's first Test, in June 1932 against England. (Note: It was a one-off Test series.) Vaman Kumar, a leg spinner, was the next to achieve this feat. His figures of 5 wickets for 64 runs took India close to winning a match against Pakistan during the latter's tour of India in 1960–61. In December 1967, Syed Abid Ali took 6 wickets for 55 runs against Australia. The figures remain the best by an Indian fast bowler on debut. Narendra Hirwani's 8 wickets for 61 runs against the West Indies, in January 1988, are the best bowling figures by an Indian on Test debut. (Note: As of February 2021, the figures are the third best by an Indian bowler.) His aggregate of 16 wickets for 136 runs in the match are a record for any bowler on debut. As of February 2021, he is the only Indian cricketer to take ten or more wickets in a Test match on debut.

The most recent Indian cricketer to achieve this feat was Manav Suthar, who took 6 wickets for 33 runs against Afghanistan in June 2026. Nissar, Ali and Shami are the only fast bowlers to achieve this feat, with rest of the seven being spin bowlers.

== Key ==
- Date – Starting date of the Test match
- Overs – Number of overs bowled in that innings
- Runs – Runs conceded
- Wkts – Number of wickets taken
- Batsmen – The batsmen whose wickets were taken in the five-wicket haul.
- Econ – Bowling economy rate (average runs per over)
- Inn – The innings of the match in which the five-wicket haul was taken.
- Result – The result for the India team in that match.
- † – The bowler was selected "Man of the match".
- ‡ – 10 wickets or more taken in the match.

== Five-wicket hauls ==
Five-wicket hauls on Test debut by Indian bowlers
No.	Bowler	Date	Ground	Against	Inn	Overs	Runs	Wkts	Econ	Batsmen	Result
1	Mohammad Nissar	25 June 1932	Lord's, London	England	1	26.0	93	5	3.57	P Holmes; H Sutcliffe; LEG Ames; RWV Robins; FR Brown	Lost
2	Vaman Kumar	8 February 1961	Feroz Shah Kotla Ground, Delhi	Pakistan	2	37.5	64	5	1.69	Imtiaz Ahmed; W Mathias; Fazal Mahmood; Mahmood Hussain; Haseeb Ahsan	Drawn
3	Syed Abid Ali	23 December 1967	Adelaide Oval, Adelaide	Australia	1	17.0	55	6	2.42	RB Simpson; WM Lawry; RM Cowper; BN Jarman; GD McKenzie; JW Gleeson	Lost
4	Dilip Doshi	11 September 1979	Madras Cricket Club Ground, Madras	Australia	1	43.0	103	6	2.39	GM Wood; KJ Hughes; GN Yallop; DF Whatmore; RM Hogg; AG Hurst	Drawn
5	Narendra Hirwani ‡	11 January 1988	MA Chidambaram Stadium, Madras	West Indies	2	18.3	61	8	3.29	RB Richardson; IVA Richards; AL Logie; CL Hooper; PJL Dujon; CG Butts; WW Davis; CA Walsh	Won
5	Narendra Hirwani ‡	11 January 1988	MA Chidambaram Stadium, Madras	West Indies	4	15.2	75	8	4.89	PV Simmons; DL Haynes; IVA Richards; CL Hooper; PJL Dujon; AL Logie; CG Butts; WW Davis	Won
6	Amit Mishra	17 October 2008	Punjab Cricket Association Stadium, Mohali	Australia	2	26.4	71	5	2.66	SM Katich; MJ Clarke; SR Watson; CL White; PM Siddle	Won
7	Ravichandran Ashwin (Note: Ashwin's five wicket haul came in the West Indies' second innings.) †	6 November 2011	Feroz Shah Kotla Ground, Delhi	West Indies	3	21.3	47	6	2.18	KOA Powell; DM Bravo; S Chanderpaul; MN Samuels; DJG Sammy; R Rampaul	Won
8	Mohammed Shami (Note: Shami's five wicket haul came in West Indies' second innings.)	8 November 2013	Eden Gardens, Kolkata	West Indies	3	13.1	47	5	3.56	MN Samuels; D Ramdin; SS Cottrell; DJG Sammy; S Shillingford	Won
9	Axar Patel	13 February 2021	M. A. Chidambaram Stadium, Chennai	England	4	21.0	60	5	2.86	DP Sibley; MJ Leach; OJD Pope; JE Root; OP Stone	Won
10	Manav Suthar	6 June 2026	Maharaja Yadavindra Singh International Cricket Stadium, New Chandigarh	Afghanistan	2	22	33	6	1.50	Abdul Malik; Rahmanullah Gurbaz; Afsar Zazai; Sharafuddin Ashraf; Rahmat Shah; Mohammad Saleem	Won
