= English cricket team in India, Pakistan and Ceylon in 1961–62 =

Cricket team tour of India in 1961-62

English cricket team in India in 1961-62
- Date: 11 November 1961 - 15 January 1962
- Location: India
- Result: India won the 5-Test series 2-0
Teams
- India: England
Captains
- Nari Contractor: Ted Dexter
Most runs
- Vijay Manjrekar (556) M. L. Jaisimha (399) Chandu Borde (314): Ken Barrington (594); Ted Dexter (409); Geoff Pullar (337)
Most wickets
- Salim Durani (23) Chandu Borde (16) Vasant Ranjane (9): Tony Lock (22); David Allen (21); Barry Knight (8)

The England national cricket team, organised by Marylebone Cricket Club (MCC), toured India, Pakistan and Ceylon from October 1961 to February 1962.

Captained by Ted Dexter, the team played five Test matches against India, with India winning two matches and the other three being drawn; and three Tests against Pakistan, with England winning the first match and the other two drawn. The itinerary was unusual in that England began in Pakistan with three matches, including the first Test at the Gaddafi Stadium in Lahore, and then went on an extensive five-Test tour of India before crossing into East Pakistan (now Bangladesh), where they played their second Test against Pakistan at the Bangabandhu National Stadium in Dhaka. For the third Test against Pakistan, they travelled to the National Stadium, Karachi before completing the tour in February with three games in Ceylon. Ceylon (now Sri Lanka) was not a Test-qualified team at that time and played a single first-class match against MCC in Colombo which was won by MCC.

== Touring team ==
- Ted Dexter (captain)
- David Allen
- Bob Barber
- Ken Barrington
- Alan Brown
- Barry Knight
- Tony Lock
- Geoff Millman
- John Murray
- Peter Parfitt
- Geoff Pullar
- Peter Richardson
- Eric Russell
- David Smith
- Mike Smith
- Butch White

Jimmy Binks also played in one first-class match. The manager was T. N. Pearce.

== Test matches in India ==
=== 1st Test ===
11–16 November 1961
scorecard

| England | v | India |
| 500/8 dec. (173.0 overs); Ken Barrington 151; Vasant Ranjane 4-76 (21.0 overs) | | 390 (168.0 overs); Salim Durani 71; Tony Lock 4-74 (45.0 overs) |
| 184/5 dec. (58.0 overs); Ken Barrington 52; Salim Durani 2-28 (11.0 overs) | | 180/5 (73.0 overs); Vijay Manjrekar 84; Peter Richardson 2-10 (6.0 overs) |

Match drawn
Brabourne Stadium, Bombay, India
Umpires: Santosh Ganguli and Bapu Joshi

=== 2nd Test ===
1–6 December 1961
scorecard

| India | v | England |
| 467/8 dec. (198.0 overs); Polly Umrigar 147; Tony Lock 3-93 (44.0 overs) | | 244 (106.3 overs); Bob Barber 69; Subhash Gupte 5-90 (40.0 overs) |
| | | 497/5 (184.0 overs); Ken Barrington 172; Chandu Borde 1-44 (16.0 overs) |

Match drawn
Modi Stadium, Kanpur, India
Umpires: Mohammad Yunus and Samar Roy

=== 3rd Test ===
13–18 December 1961
scorecard

| India | v | England |
| 466 (177.3 overs); Vijay Manjrekar 189; David Allen 4-87 (47.0 overs) | | 256/3 (114.0 overs); Ken Barrington 113; A. G. Kripal Singh 1-27 (12.0 overs) |

Match drawn
Feroz Shah Kotla, Delhi, India
Umpires: S. V. Kumaraswamy and Badami Satyaji Rao

=== 4th Test ===
30 December 1961 – 4 January 1962
scorecard

| India | v | England |
| 380 (156.0 overs); Chandu Borde 68; David Allen 5-67 (34.0 overs) | | 212 (79.2 overs); Peter Richardson 62; Salim Durani 5-47 (23.2 overs) |
| 252 (101.2 overs); Chandu Borde 61; David Allen 4-95 (43.2 overs) | | 233 (116.2 overs); Ted Dexter 62; Salim Durani 3-66 (33.2 overs) |

India won by 187 runs
Eden Gardens, Calcutta, India
Umpires: Habib Choudhury and S. K. Raghunatha Rao

=== 5th Test ===
10–15 January 1962
scorecard

| India | v | England |
| 428 (144.3 overs); Nawab of Pataudi, Jr. 103; David Allen 3-116 (51.3 overs) | | 281 (110.1 overs); M. J. K. Smith 73; Salim Durani 6-105 (36.0 overs) |
| 190 (94.3 overs); Vijay Manjrekar 85; Tony Lock 6-65 (39.3 overs) | | 209 (92.3 overs); Ken Barrington 48; Salim Durani 4-72 (34.0 overs) |

India won by 128 runs
Nehru Stadium, Madras, India
Umpires: I. Gopalakrishnan and Sambhu Pan

== Test matches in Pakistan ==
England played three Tests against Pakistan in a split series, the first match being played in October 1961 and the latter two in the new year following the tour of India. England won the first and the other two were drawn. England were captained by Ted Dexter and Pakistan by Imtiaz Ahmed. After this, England would not win another test series in Pakistan for 39 years.

=== 1st Test ===
21–26 October 1961
(5-day match)
Scorecard

| Pakistan | v | England |
| 387/9d (142.5 overs); Javed Burki 138; Butch White 3/65 (22 overs) | | 380 (174.1 overs); Ken Barrington 139; Mohammad Munaf 4/42 (31.1 overs) |
| 200 (75.5 overs); Afaq Hussain 35*; Alan Brown 3/27 (14 overs) | | 209/5 (59 overs); Ted Dexter 66*; Intikhab Alam 2/37 (16 overs) |

England won by 5 wickets
Lahore Stadium, Lahore
Umpires: Ahmed Saeed and Shujauddin

- Pakistan won the toss and elected to bat.
- 23 October was taken as a rest day.
- Alan Brown, Eric Russell, and Butch White (all ENG); and Afaq Hussain (PAK) made their Test debuts.

=== 2nd Test ===
19–24 January 1962
(5-day match)
Scorecard

| Pakistan | v | England |
| 393/7d (192.3 overs); Javed Burki 140; Tony Lock 4/155 (73 overs) | | 439 (181 overs); Geoff Pullar 165; Antao D'Souza 4/94 (46 overs) |
| 216 (134.1 overs); Hanif Mohammad 104; David Allen 5/30 (23.1 overs) | | 38/0 (16 overs); Peter Richardson 21* |

Match drawn
Dacca Stadium, Dacca
Umpires: Daud Khan and Shujauddin

- Pakistan won the toss and elected to bat.
- 22 January was taken as a rest day.

=== 3rd Test ===
2–7 February 1962
(5-day match)
Scorecard

| Pakistan | v | England |
| 253 (95 overs); Alimuddin 109; Barry Knight 4/66 (19 overs) | | 507 (233.5 overs); Ted Dexter 205; Antao D'Souza 5/112 (57.5 overs) |
| 404/8 (167 overs); Hanif Mohammad 89; Ted Dexter 3/86 (32 overs) |

Match drawn
National Stadium, Karachi
Umpires: Daud Khan and Shujauddin

- Pakistan won the toss and elected to bat.
- 5 February was taken as a rest day.

== Ceylon ==
MCC won their first-class fixture in Colombo by 8 wickets. Ted Dexter captained MCC and Ceylon were led by Ievers Gunasekara.
