= Indian cricket team in England in 1959 =

International cricket tour

	India	England
- Dates: 4 June – 24 August 1959
Captains	Datta Gaekwad	Peter May

Test series
- Result: England won the 5-match series 5–0
Most runs	Nari Contractor (233)	Ken Barrington (357)
Most wickets	Subhash Gupte (17)	Fred Trueman (22)

The Indian cricket team toured England in the 1959 season. The team played five Test matches against England and lost them all: the first time that England had won all the matches in a five-match series. Only one of the Tests, the game at Manchester, went into the fifth day.

In all first-class matches, the Indian team won just six times and lost 11, with 16 of the 33 games left drawn.

== The background ==
India's first tour of England since 1952 came with the Indian side in transition. A home series against West Indies in 1958-59 had been lost 3–0, and there had been four captains in the five Tests. Three of those four, Ghulam Ahmed, Vinoo Mankad and Hemu Adhikari, retired from Test cricket after that series and the 1959 touring party included a lot of unproven players.

England has also had a chastening experience in the run-up to the 1959 Test series. Having retained The Ashes in 1956, overcome the West Indies' Ramadhin and Valentine combination in 1957, and crushed New Zealand in 1958, the team had been full of confidence that The Ashes would be retained in Australia in 1958–59. In the event, the tour was a disaster, and Australia won 4–0.

== The Indian team ==
The team consisted of 17 players, and that rose to 18 when Abbas Ali Baig was recruited at the end of the Oxford University cricket season to take the place of the injured Vijay Manjrekar. The team was captained by Datta Gaekwad and managed by the Maharaja of Baroda, himself a cricketer for Baroda and at 29 younger than several of the team.

The team was:

- Datta Gaekwad, captain
- Pankaj Roy, vice-captain
- Arvind Apte
- Abbas Ali Baig
- Chandu Borde
- Nari Contractor
- Ramakant Desai
- Jayasinghrao Ghorpade
- Subhash Gupte
- M. L. Jaisimha
- Nana Joshi, wicketkeeper
- A. G. Kripal Singh
- Vijay Manjrekar
- V. M. Muddiah
- Bapu Nadkarni
- Surendranath
- Naren Tamhane, wicketkeeper
- Polly Umrigar

Gaekwad, Roy, Manjrekar and Umrigar had been members of the 1952 Indian team in England. Though the team as a whole was not experienced, all except Apte, Baig, Jaisimha and Muddiah had played Test cricket before the tour, and 17 of the 18 players appeared in the 1959 Test series. The exception was Muddiah, who remained uncapped by India until the following winter.

== The Test Matches ==
=== First Test ===
4–8 June 1959
Scorecard

England	v	India
422 (143.2 overs); Peter May 106; Subhash Gupte 4/102 (38.1 overs)		206 (102.5 overs); Pankaj Roy 54; Fred Trueman 4/45 (24 overs)
		157 (97.3 overs); Pankaj Roy 49; Brian Statham 5/31 (21 overs)

England won by an innings and 59 runs
Trent Bridge, Nottingham
Umpires: JS Buller, WE Phillipson

- England won the toss and decided to bat

England began nervously against Surendranath and Desai, but Peter May hit 106 and 50s from Ken Barrington, Martin Horton (in his first Test) and a quickfire 73 from Godfrey Evans meant that the hosts ended the first day at 358 for six wickets. India began very slowly, and Tommy Greenhough, in his first Test also, conceded 16 runs in his first 16 overs, also taking the first wicket, that of Contractor. Two wickets for Fred Trueman were followed by late rain, and on the third day Borde was unable to resume his innings, having broken a finger the previous evening. India's batting, with Nadkarni also handicapped by injury, subsided against hostile bowling from Trueman, Brian Statham and Alan Moss, and the innings of 206 took 375 minutes and 102.5 overs. Only Roy reached 50, and in the follow-on he made a further 49. But apart from Manjrekar (44), Gaekwad (31) and Umrigar (20) no other batsman reached double figures, and Borde was unable to bat. The match finished at 3.30 on the fourth day.

=== Second Test ===
18–20 June 1959
Scorecard

India	v	England
168 (77.4 overs); Nari Contractor 81; Tommy Greenhough 5/35 (16 overs)		226 (84.4 overs); Ken Barrington 80; Ramakant Desai 5/89 (31.4 overs)
165 (79.1 overs); Vijay Manjrekar 61; Brian Statham 3/45 (17 overs)		108/2 (27.2 overs); Colin Cowdrey 63; Ramakant Desai 1/29 (7 overs)

England won by 8 wickets
Lord's Cricket Ground
Umpires: DE Davies, CS Elliott

- India won the toss and decided to bat

Gaekwad, Borde and Nadkarni were injured, so Roy captained India. Contractor, hit by Statham, batted with a cracked rib but still made almost half of India's first innings runs, with a determined 81. Greenhough took five for 35 as the last six wickets fell for just 24 runs. The Indian bowlers then hit back and reduced England to 80 for six, but Ken Barrington, with 80, found unlikely batting allies in Statham and Moss, so England claimed a lead of 58. Trueman dismissed Roy and Umrigar in the first over and though Manjrekar and Kripal Singh added 89 for the fifth wicket, the last six wickets fell this time for 34 and England required only 108, which an unbeaten 63 from Colin Cowdrey easily achieved.

=== Third Test ===
2-4 July 1959
Scorecard

India	v	England
161 (68.5 overs); Polly Umrigar 29; Harold Rhodes 4/50 (18.5 overs)		483/8 d (174.3 overs); Colin Cowdrey 160; Subhash Gupte 4/111 (44.3 overs)
149 (55.4 overs); Chandu Borde 41; Brian Close 4/35 (11 overs)

England won by an innings and 173 runs
Headingley, Leeds
Umpires: FS Lee, WE Phillipson

- India won the toss and decided to bat

England made six changes and one of the newcomers, Harold Rhodes, took wickets with his fourth and twelfth balls in Test cricket to reduce India to 23 for four, with new wicketkeeper Roy Swetman taking three catches. Later Indian batsmen did better, but no one reached 30 on a bland wicket. England's new opening pair of Gilbert Parkhouse and Geoff Pullar put on 146 for the first wicket, and then Cowdrey and Barrington put on 193 for the fourth wicket, Cowdrey going on to make 160. After early wickets for Moss and Trueman, India rallied with a partnership of 69 between Borde and Umrigar before the off-spin pairing of Brian Close and John Mortimore finished things off by five o'clock on the third day.

=== Fourth Test ===
23–28 July 1959
Scorecard

England	v	India
490 (174.1 overs); Geoff Pullar 131; Surendranath 5/115 (47.1 overs)		208 (79 overs); Chandu Borde 75; Barrington 3/36 (14 overs)
265/8 d (90 overs); Gilbert Parkhouse 49; Subhash Gupte 4/76 (26 overs)		376 (145.1 overs); Polly Umrigar 118; Fred Trueman 2/75 (23.1 overs)

England won by 171 runs
Old Trafford, Manchester
Umpires: JS Buller, CS Elliott

- England won the toss and decided to bat

Pullar became the first Lancashire player to hit a century in an Old Trafford Test, and MJK Smith made 100 as well. With 87 from Barrington and 67 from Cowdrey, England made the highest total of the series. Surendranath took five for 115 in 47.1 overs. India's batting again let them down, though Borde made 75 and guided the tail to a total of more than 200. Cowdrey, captaining England as Peter May was ill (he underwent an operation during the match), did not enforce the follow-on, but England batted with little urgency. Parkhouse, Barrington, Ted Dexter and Ray Illingworth each passed 40, but none of them reached 50. The declaration set India 547 to win. A second wicket stand of 109 between Contractor, who made 56, and Baig, who was making his debut, was India's best of the series. Baig reached 85 when he was struck on the head by a bouncer from Rhodes and had to retire. He was able to resume the next morning and, in partnership with Umrigar, threatened to save or even win the match. Both reached centuries – Baig in his first Test, Umrigar's the only one he ever made in England – but once Baig had been run out for 112, the innings quickly folded, Umrigar being eighth out for 118.

=== Fifth Test ===
20–24 August 1959 (5-day match)
Scorecard

India	v	England
140 (85.3 overs); Naren Tamhane 32; Fred Trueman 4/24 (17 overs)		361 (147.3 overs); Mike Smith 98; Surendranath 5/75 (51.3 overs)
194 (95 overs); Bapu Nadkarni 76; Fred Trueman 3/30 (14 overs)

England won by an innings and 27 runs
Kennington Oval, Kennington
Umpires: DE Davies, FS Lee

- India won the toss and decided to bat

England completed the 5-0 whitewash by lunch on the fourth day. India batted poorly against Trueman and Statham and only a late partnership of 58 for the eighth wicket between Tamhane and Surendranath brought any comfort. The innings occupied five hours and 85.3 overs. England relied on a third wicket partnership of 169 between Raman Subba Row, who made 94, and MJK Smith (98), and then Illingworth and Swetman made maiden Test 50s in putting on 102 for the seventh wicket. India's second innings was more spirited than their first, with Nadkarni making 76 in four hours, but the result was not in doubt.

== Other first-class matches ==
If fragile batting was one of the weaknesses of the touring side, then occasional individual batting successes were responsible for several of the team's six victories in other first-class matches. Double-centuries for Umrigar and Manjrekar were behind the wins against the two first-class university sides, and Umrigar made another double-century in the win against Northamptonshire (as well as one in the drawn match with Somerset). The Middlesex victory came against a side with many regulars absent, and only towards the end of the tour, in the wins against Glamorgan and Kent, did the side perform satisfactorily as a team.

Only three counties defeated the tourists and in one of those, the match against Gloucestershire at Cheltenham, the pitch deteriorated over the course of the three days (which made Roy's decision to put the county in rather strange). Representative matches against MCC and a full-strength international side assembled by T. N. Pearce for the Scarborough festival were also lost. And the Indians became the first touring side to lose against the Minor Counties representative side since the West Indian cricket team in England in 1928, largely as a result of a remarkable unbeaten 202 by Phil Sharpe that enabled the Minor Counties to reach a target of 334 with only four wickets lost.

In a hot and sunny summer with a lot of runs in all forms of cricket, 16 matches were drawn.

== Leading players ==
The Indian team's Test match averages and aggregates in a depressing series were a long way below those of the England players. Eight England team members who batted three or more times in the series averaged more than 50 runs per innings; three bowlers took 14 or more wickets and averaged less than 20 runs per wicket. Brian Statham had the unusual distinction of heading both batting and bowling averages, though his average of 70 with the bat reflected the fact that he was dismissed only once in three innings. Fred Trueman, scourge of the Indian cricket team in England in 1952, took most wickets with 24 at 16.70.

Baig headed India's batting with 165 runs from four innings; Contractor scored most runs, 233. The leg-spinner Gupte took 17 wickets at an average of 34.64, but the leading bowler by average was Surendranath, whose 16 wickets cost 26.62 each.

On the tour as a whole, Manjrekar's unbeaten 204 against Oxford University enabled him to head not only the tourists' averages, but the averages for all players in the first-class season. He scored 755 runs at an average of 68.63. Umrigar's three double-centuries, including the tour highest, 252 not out against Cambridge University, brought him the highest aggregate: 1,826 runs at 55.33 runs per innings. Of the other batsmen, Gaekwad, Contractor, Roy and Borde passed 1,000 runs in all first-class matches, and Baig did so if his tour aggregate was added to his university runs earlier in the season. Of the younger batsmen, Apte and Kripal Singh each had one very large innings, but Ghorpade and Jaisimha failed to score a century.

Borde was in terms of averages and strike rate the most successful bowler, his 72 wickets costing 20.62 runs each. Gupte, heralded before the tour as the leading leg-spin bowler in the world, disappointed, and failed to take 100 wickets in the season: his aggregate of 95 was the highest for the tourists, however. Nadkarni was a useful off-spinner but he lacked penetration and was used primarily defensively. The two young opening bowlers, Surendranath and Desai, both of them barely above medium pace, had contrasting seasons: Surendranath impressed with his control and reliability and took 79 wickets at 28 each, but Desai was expensive and his 45 tour wickets cost 41.42 runs apiece. Muddiah barely played, Ghorpade barely bowled, and Jaisimha was several times pressed into service as an emergency opening bowler without ever looking suited to the role.

Joshi and Tamhane shared wicketkeeping duties throughout the tour, playing in three and two Tests respectively. Ghorpade and Borde attracted favourable comment for their fielding.

== Verdict and aftermath ==
Wisden Cricketers' Almanack for 1960, reporting on the tour, said that the record of the team was even worse than that of the New Zealand cricket team in England in 1958, which was itself regarded as the worst in living memory. It suggested that the problem was deep-seated, in that the side appeared only rarely to play as a team, though talented individuals made occasional contributions.

Under a new captain, Gulabrai Ramchand, India gave a much more creditable account of themselves in a home series the following winter against Australia, losing the series only 2–1, though the single victory came in a match at Kanpur on a newly-laid pitch that off-spinner Jasubhai Patel exploited to the extent of taking 14 wickets in the match.
