= Shatrunjay Gaekwad =

Indian cricketer (born 1983)

Personal information
- Full name: Shatrunjay Anshuman Gaekwad
- Born: 3 September 1983 (age 43); Baroda, Gujarat
- Batting: Left-handed
- Role: batsman
- Relatives: Anshuman Gaekwad (father); Datta Gaekwad (grandfather)

Domestic team information
- Years: Team
- 2003/04–2013/14: Baroda

Career statistics
Competition	FC	LA	T20
Matches	23	10	10
Runs scored	1015	231	136
Batting average	27.43	25.66	27.20
100s/50s	1/5	0/1	0/0
Top score	118	67	45*
Catches/stumpings	16/0	1/0	4/0
- Source: ESPNcricinfo

Shatrunjay Gaekwad is an Indian former cricketer. He played for Baroda and was signed by the Kolkata Knight Riders.

== Early life ==
He was born in 1983. His father Anshuman Gaekwad, and grandfather Datta Gaekwad were also cricketers.

== Career ==
He made his first class debut for Baroda in 2003.
