= V. M. Muddiah =

Indian cricketer (1929–2009)

Personal information
- Full name: Venkatappa Musandra Muddiah
- Born: 8 June 1929; Bangalore, British India
- Died: 1 October 2009 (aged 80); Bangalore, Karnataka, India
- Batting: Right-handed
- Bowling: Right arm off break / medium

International information
- National side: India
- Test debut (cap 94): 12 December 1959 v Australia
- Last Test: 21 December 1960 v Pakistan

Domestic team information
- Years: Team
- 1949–1962: Services
- 1951–1952: Mysore
- 1953–1954: Hyderabad

Career statistics
Competition	Test	First-class
Matches	2	61
Runs scored	11	805
Batting average	5.50	13.87
100s/50s	0/0	0/4
Top score	11	67
Balls bowled	318	9,918
Wickets	3	175
Bowling average	44.66	23.76
5 wickets in innings	–	10
10 wickets in match	–	1
Best bowling	2/40	8/54
Catches/stumpings	0/–	62/–
- Source: Cricinfo, 21 October 2009

Venkatappa Musandra Muddiah (8 June 1929 – 1 October 2009) was an Indian cricketer who played in 2 Tests from 1959 to 1960.

Born in Bangalore, Mysore, Muddiah came up through the Mysore University and Mysore State 'B' team. He studied in the Malleswaram Middle and High School and Central College, Bangalore. He later played club cricket for Malleswaram Gymkhana and Friends Union CC. He joined the Indian Air Force in 1948, but was soon found 'unfit for flying'. He left the Air Force and represented Mysore in 1951–52 but was recalled to the IAF as an Air Traffic Controller in the next year. He went on to become a wing commander before taking voluntary retirement in 1979.

Muddiah started off a batsman, became a medium pacer and finally an off-spinner. He retained his fifteen step runup even while bowling spin. He had a great start to his first class career when he took 8 for 54 and 4 for 43 for Services against Southern Punjab in 1949. But for most of his career he had to live in the shadow of Ghulam Ahmed who was the primary Indian off spinner at the time. Muddiah was not selected for the Indian team till Ghulam retired in 1959.

Muddiah toured England in 1959, took thirty wickets in first class matches but did not appear in a Test. He failed to take a wicket on Test debut against Australia at Delhi in 1959–60. In his only other appearance, against Pakistan a year later, he took the wickets of Mushtaq Mohammad, Hanif Mohammad and Imtiaz Ahmed and had Wallis Mathias dropped at short-leg by Polly Umrigar.

Another chance came against the visiting England team in 1961–62. Muddiah took 6 for 71 for the North Zone, all the wickets were top-order batsmen. But after an unsuccessful match for Services against MCC on the eve of the fourth Test he was not selected. He retired soon after.

Muddiah took 175 wickets in his first class career that lasted until late 1962. One of his more notable performances was for Mysore in the 1951-52 Ranji semifinal against Bombay. After Mysore made 170, Bombay finished the first day on 163 for 1. It rained overnight and Muddiah took six wickets in eight overs to bowl Bombay out for 205 on the second day. Mysore still lost by an inning. He also took 5 for 2 against Jammu and Kashmir in 1961–62.

Muddiah had his benefit match in 1980. The Government of Karnataka provided him with 5 acres (20,000 m^{2}) of land outside Bangalore where he ran a farm. He had two daughters and a son who is a lieutenant colonel in the Army.

== Sources ==
- Rajan Bala, "In the shadow of Ghulam Ahmed", Crickettalk magazine, 20 July 2000.
- Vedam Jaishankar, Casting a spell: The story of Karnataka cricket, UBS Publishers, ISBN 81-7476-505-0, pp. 47–51
