= International cricket in 1959 =

International cricket season

The 1959 International cricket season was from April 1959 to August 1959.

== Season overview ==
International tours
Start date	Home team	Away team	Results [Matches]			
Start date	Home team	Away team	Test	ODI	FC	LA
4 June 1959	England	India	5–0 [5]	—	—	—
25 July 1959	Netherlands	Denmark	—	—	1–0 [1]	—

== June ==
=== India in England ===
Test series
No.	Date	Home captain	Away captain	Venue	Result
Test 474	4–8 June	Peter May	Datta Gaekwad	Trent Bridge, Nottingham	England by an innings and 59 runs
Test 475	18–20 June	Peter May	Datta Gaekwad	Lord's, London	England by 8 wickets
Test 476	2–4 July	Peter May	Datta Gaekwad	Headingley Cricket Ground, Leeds	England by an innings and 173 runs
Test 477	23–28 July	Colin Cowdrey	Datta Gaekwad	Old Trafford Cricket Ground, Manchester	England by 171 runs
Test 478	20–24 August	Colin Cowdrey	Datta Gaekwad	Kennington Oval, London	England by an innings and 27 runs

== July ==
=== Denmark in Netherlands ===
Two-day Match
No.	Date	Home captain	Away captain	Venue	Result
Match	25–26 July	LC de Villeneuve	Axel Morild	VRA Cricket Ground, Amsterdam	Netherlands by 6 wickets
