= Mohammad Munaf (cricketer) =

Pakistani cricketer (1935–2020)

Personal information
- Born: 2 November 1935; Bombay, British India (now India)
- Died: 28 January 2020 (aged 84); Amsterdam, Netherlands
- Batting: Right-handed
- Bowling: Right-arm fast-medium

International information
- National side: Pakistan
- Test debut (cap 33): 21 November 1959 v Australia
- Last Test: 19 January 1962 v England

Career statistics
Competition	Tests	First-class
Matches	4	71
Runs scored	63	1356
Batting average	12.59	17.61
100s/50s	0/0	0/4
Top score	19	76
Balls bowled	769	9115
Wickets	11	180
Bowling average	31.00	24.22
5 wickets in innings	0	6
10 wickets in match	0	1
Best bowling	4/42	8/84
Catches/stumpings	0/–	47/–
- Source: ESPNcricinfo, 7 September 2015

Mohammad Munaf (2 November 1935 – 28 January 2020) was a Pakistani cricketer who played four Tests for his country from 1959 to 1962. He played first-class cricket in Pakistan from 1953 to 1971.

== Early life and education ==
Munaf was born in Bombay to a Konkani family that migrated to Pakistan from the west coast of Maharashtra. He was educated at Sindh Maddrasatul Islam.

== Career ==
After settling in Karachi, he, as a strapping young fast bowler, made his name in the Rubie Shield school tournament. At that time, he was good enough with the bat to have opened the batting with Hanif Mohammad for Sindh Madrassah. Khadim H. Baloch wrote in his Encyclopaedia of Pakistan Cricket that Munaf delivered off a short run-up and had a slingy, round-arm action, and some reports had him, at his peak, as one of the fastest bowlers in the country.

But his career coincided with early riches in Pakistan's pace resources. Fazal Mahmood, Khan Mohammad and Mahmood Hussain were all starters for the national side ahead of him. He toured the West Indies in 1957-58 without playing in any of the five Tests. His debut Test against Australia in 1959-60 only happened because Hussain was unavailable. He would go on to play only three more Tests, all in Pakistan, with a best of 4 for 42 against England in Lahore in 1961–62. He was also part of Pakistan's squad to India on the 1960-61 tour, though once again he did not play a single Test.

Munaf's potential was never in doubt, though, as evidenced by two trips he made to England as part of the Pakistan Eaglets team. His career-best figures of 8 for 84 came on an Eaglets tour in 1963, against Kent. England may have been a good place for his bowling and though he was picked for what turned out to be a disastrous tour of England in 1962, he had to withdraw due to a leg injury.

He worked for Pakistan International Airlines. After he retired he moved to the Netherlands and settled in Amsterdam.
