= International cricket in 1971 =

International cricket season

The 1971 International cricket season was from May 1971 to August 1971.

== Season overview ==
International tours
Start date	Home team	Away team	Results [Matches]			
Start date	Home team	Away team	Test	ODI	FC	LA
3 June 1971	England	Pakistan	1–0 [3]	—	—	—
22 July 1971	England	India	0–1 [3]	—	—	—

== June ==
=== Pakistan in England ===
Test series
No.	Date	Home captain	Away captain	Venue	Result
Test 687	3–8 June	Ray Illingworth	Intikhab Alam	Edgbaston Cricket Ground, Birmingham	Match drawn
Test 688	17–22 June	Ray Illingworth	Intikhab Alam	Lord's, London	Match drawn
Test 689	8–13 July	Ray Illingworth	Intikhab Alam	Headingley Cricket Ground, Leeds	England win by 25 runs

== July ==
=== India in England ===
Test series
No.	Date	Home captain	Away captain	Venue	Result
Test 690	22–27 July	Ray Illingworth	Ajit Wadekar	Lord's, London	Match drawn
Test 691	5–10 August	Ray Illingworth	Ajit Wadekar	Old Trafford Cricket Ground, Manchester	Match drawn
Test 692	19–24 August	Ray Illingworth	Ajit Wadekar	Kennington Oval, London	India by 4 wickets
