= Surendran =

Surendran is a given name and a surname. Notable people with the name include:

Given name:

- Surendran Nair (born 1956), Indian artist
- V. Surendran Pillai, minister for Ports and Youth Affairs in the government of Kerala, India
- Surendran Ravindran (born 1987), Malaysian football player
- Surendran Reddy (1962–2010), South African composer and pianist

Surname:

- A. R. Surendran (died 2016), Sri Lankan Tamil lawyer and President's Counsel
- C. P. Surendran (born 1956), poet, novelist and journalist from India
- Chengara Surendran (born 1968), member of the 14th Lok Sabha of India
- D. Surendran (born 1980), Malaysian footballer
- K. Surendran (1921–1997), Indian novelist who wrote in Malayalam
- Kadakampally Surendran, Indian communist politician in the Government of Kerala
- M. Surendran, Indian politician and former Member of the Legislative Assembly of Tamil Nadu
- N. Surendran, Malaysian lawyer and politician
- Nikhilesh Surendran (born 1992), Indian first-class cricketer
- P. Surendran (born 1961), Indian writer, columnist, art critic and a philanthropist
- R. Surendran (born 1982), Malaysian footballer
- Saji Surendran, Indian film director in Malayalam films, notably Ivar Vivahitharayal
- K. Surendran, 11th president of Bhartiya janata party Kerala

== See also ==
- Surena
- Surendra
- Surendranath
