= Anshuman Gaekwad =

Indian cricketer (1952–2024)

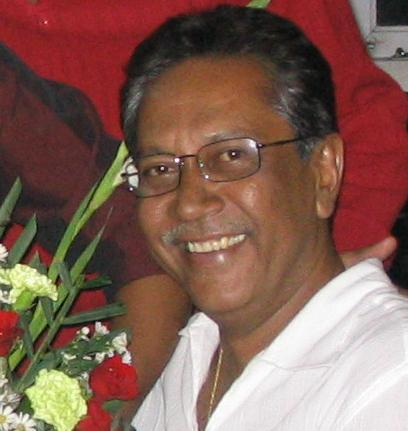
- Gaekwad in 2005

Personal information
- Full name: Anshuman Dattajirao Gaekwad
- Born: 23 September 1952; Bombay, Bombay State, India
- Died: 31 July 2024 (aged 71); Vadodara, Gujarat, India
- Batting: Right-handed
- Bowling: Right-arm offbreak
- Role: Batsman
- Relatives: Datta Gaekwad (father), Jyoti Gaekwad (wife), Shatrunjay Gaekwad (son)

International information
- National side: India
- Test debut (cap 135): 27 December 1974 v West Indies
- Last Test: 31 December 1984 v England
- ODI debut (cap 15): 7 June 1975 v England
- Last ODI: 23 December 1987 v West Indies

Head coaching information
- Years: Team
- 1997–1999; 2000: India

Career statistics
Competition	Test	ODI
Matches	40	15
Runs scored	1,985	269
Batting average	30.07	20.69
100s/50s	2/10	0/1
Top score	201	78*
Balls bowled	334	48
Wickets	2	1
Bowling average	93.50	39.00
5 wickets in innings	0	0
10 wickets in match	0	0
Best bowling	1/4	1/39
Catches/stumpings	15/–	6/–
Medal record
Men's Cricket
Representing India as Coach
ICC Champions Trophy
Runner-up	2000 Kenya
- Source: ESPNcricinfo, 31 December 2006

Anshuman Dattajirao Gaekwad (23 September 1952 – 31 July 2024) was an Indian cricketer and two-time Indian national cricket coach. In a career spanning over a decade, he played 40 Test matches and 15 One Day Internationals between 1974 and 1984. His father, Datta Gaekwad was also an Indian test cricketer. Gaekwad was the coach of the Indian team that finished joint-winners at the 2000 ICC Champions Trophy.

Gaekwad was a recipient of the C. K. Nayudu Lifetime Achievement Award, Indian cricket's highest honour, in 2018.

== Early life ==
Gaekwad was born on 23 September 1952 in Bombay (present day Mumbai) in the Indian state of Maharashtra, to Ushadevi and Datta Gaekwad, an Indian cricketer, who played 11 Tests in the 1950s. The senior Gaekwad held the title of the oldest living Indian Test cricketer before his death in February 2024. Gaekwad was also related to the Gaekwad royal family in Gujarat.

He studied at the Maharani Chimnabai High School and later at the Maharaja Sayajirao University in Baroda. During this time, he played for Baroda and West Zone in the Indian domestic cricket circuit.

== Career ==
=== Playing career ===
Gaekwad made his debut in the third test of the 1974 West Indies tour of India in Calcutta (present day Kolkata) scoring 36 runs. He started out in the middle order, but, was moved up the order in the next test, where he opened with Sunil Gavaskar. He batted right handed and bowled right-arm off spin.

His test career lasted through 1984, when he played his last international test innings in the third test in England's tour of India in Calcutta, a ground where he had also made his debut in. He continued to play in the domestic circuit playing his last game for West Zone against North Zone in 1987, a game in which he scored a double century.

Along his international career, Gaekwad scored 1985 runs from 40 Tests at an average of 30.07 with 2 centuries and 10 half centuries to his credit. He scored his highest Test score of 201 against Pakistan at Jalandhar in 1982–83. This innings, where he spent 671 minutes, was noted as an example for his patient style and concentration.

Gaekwad was nicknamed The Great Wall and was known for his defensive play, particularly against the fast bowlers led by the West Indian pace bowlers who dominated world cricket at the time. Recounting a strike on his face and his ear in the 1976 test against West Indies in Kingston, Jamaica by the West Indian fast bowler Michael Holding, who was nicknamed Whispering Death, Gaekwad recalled, "My glasses flew all over the place and there was blood all around." Gaekwad had to undergo two surgeries and was left with hearing damage. Earlier in the same test Gaekwad had batted for seven hours seeing a hostile spell by Holding and Wayne Daniel, to score 81 runs, India's top score in that innings.

=== Post-playing career ===
Gaekwad was involved in Indian cricketer as a team selector and a coach after his playing days. His first role as a coach lasted from 1997 to 1999. During this time, the team had a poor showing in the World cup and achieved limited success.

His second role as a coach was in 2000, where he picked up after Kapil Dev, and coached the team until John Wright's tenure. This period saw the debut of players like Harbhajan Singh, Zaheer Khan and Yuvraj Singh. The team was runners-up in the 2000 Champions Trophy during his tenure as a coach. He also served as a coach for the Kenyan cricket team for a brief period.

Gaekwad worked for the Gujarat State Fertilizers & Chemicals after his retirement. He was also the president of the Indian Cricketers' Association. He was awarded the C. K. Nayudu Lifetime Achievement Award, the highest honour conferred by BCCI on a former player, in 2018.

== Personal life and death ==
Gaekwad was married to Jyoti Gaekwad, a painter. The couple had two sons, Annirudha and Shatrunjay Gaekwad, both of whom were cricketers, with the latter having represented Baroda in Ranji trophy.

Gaekwad died from leukemia, a type of blood cancer, in Vadodara on 31 July 2024, at the age of 71. Gaekwad had been suffering from cancer for a while and had even sought treatment at Kings College Hospital, London. The BCCI and his fellow India teammates had come forward to provide financial help for his treatment after an appeal from the likes of Kapil Dev.

== Books ==
- Bhushan, Aditya (2023). Bajaj, Sachin (ed.). Guts Amidst Bloodbath: The Aunshuman Gaekwad Narrative. Notion Press. ISBN 979-8-89026-344-5.

Preceded by Madan Lal	Indian National Cricket Coach; October 1997 – September 1999	Succeeded by Kapil Dev
Preceded by Kapil Dev	Indian National Cricket Coach; August 2000 – October 2000	Succeeded by John Wright
