= Ambar Roy =

Indian cricketer (1945–1997)

Personal information
- Full name: Ambar Khirid Roy
- Born: 5 June 1945; Calcutta, Bengal Presidency, British India
- Died: 19 September 1997 (aged 52); Calcutta, West Bengal, India
- Batting: Left-handed
- Bowling: Right-arm medium
- Relatives: Pankaj Roy (uncle); Pranab Roy (cousin)

International information
- National side: India
- Test debut (cap 121): 3 October 1969 v New Zealand
- Last Test: 12 December 1969 v Australia

Career statistics
Competition	Test	First-class
Matches	4	132
Runs scored	91	7,163
Batting average	13.00	43.15
100s/50s	0/0	18/32
Top score	48	197
Balls bowled	–	1,952
Wickets	–	29
Bowling average	–	34.86
5 wickets in innings	–	0
10 wickets in match	–	0
Best bowling	–	4/44
Catches/stumpings	0/–	83/2
- Source: ESPNcricinfo, 10 September 2022

Ambar Khirid Roy (5 June 1945 – 19 September 1997) was an Indian cricketer who played in four Test matches in 1969.

In his first Test innings Roy scored 48 against New Zealand at Nagpur. He did not score well in subsequent matches, and after poor scores against Australia at Delhi and Kolkata later in the season, he was dropped. In his final Test match, at his home ground Kolkata, he scored 18 and 19.
