= Pranab Roy =

Indian cricketer (born 1963)

Personal information
- Full name: Pranab Roy
- Born: 10 February 1957 (age 69); Calcutta, West Bengal, India
- Batting: Right-handed
- Bowling: Right-arm medium
- Relatives: Pankaj Roy (father); Ambar Roy (cousin)

International information
- National side: India
- Test debut (cap 156): 13 January 1981 v England
- Last Test: 4 February 1981 v England

Career statistics
Competition	Test	First-class
Matches	2	72
Runs scored	71	4,056
Batting average	35.50	40.96
100s/50s	0/1	13/11
Top score	60*	230*
Balls bowled	230	241
Wickets	0	79
Bowling average	–	134.00
5 wickets in innings	–	0
10 wickets in match	–	0
Best bowling	–	3/19
Catches/stumpings	1/–	42/–
- Source: CricInfo, 17 November 2022

Pranab Roy (born 10 February 1963) is a former Indian cricketer who played two Test matches for India.

== Early life ==
He received his early education at Rama Chandra School in Kolkata. His father Pankaj Roy taught him cricket when he was 5 years old. He took interest in Cricket at the age of 9. His coach Sundar Biswas coached him. He was known for his prolific batting. His idol was Mushtaq Ali.

He had an accident on 5 November 1975 when he was 18 years old where he was playing cricket with his friends and his leather ball got hit on his face. His teeth fell down and his nose bled heavily. He was rushed to a city hospital in Kolkata and he had a facial surgery. Presently he runs Pankaj Roy Cricket Academy in Salt Lake.
