= Nemailal Roy =

Indian cricketer (born 1941)

Personal information
- Born: 10 March 1941 (age 85); Calcutta, Bengal, British India
- Batting: Right-handed
- Bowling: Right-arm offbreak
- Relatives: Pankaj Roy (brother)

Career statistics
Competition	First-class
Matches	12
Runs scored	312
Batting average	20.80
100s/50s	1/1
Top score	102
Balls bowled	30
Wickets	0
Bowling average	–
5 wickets in innings	–
10 wickets in match	–
Best bowling	–
Catches/stumpings	4/–
- Source: ESPNcricinfo, 29 May 2016

Nemailal Roy (born 10 March 1941) is an Indian former cricketer. He played first-class cricket for Bengal and Jharkhand.
