= Mohammad Farooq (cricketer) =

Pakistani cricketer (born 1938)

Personal information
- Born: 8 April 1938 (age 88); Junagadh, Gujarat, British India
- Batting: Right-handed
- Bowling: Right-arm fast-medium

International information
- National side: Pakistan
- Test debut (cap 37): 2 December 1960 v India
- Last Test: 9 April 1965 v New Zealand

Career statistics
Competition	Test	First-class
Matches	7	33
Runs scored	85	173
Batting average	17.00	12.35
100s/50s	0/0	0/0
Top score	47	47
Balls bowled	1,422	6,126
Wickets	21	123
Bowling average	32.47	26.98
5 wickets in innings	0	5
10 wickets in match	0	1
Best bowling	4/70	6/87
Catches/stumpings	1/–	7/–
- Source: Cricinfo, 9 July 2017

Mohammad Farooq (born 8 April 1938) is a former Pakistani international cricketer who played in seven Test matches between 1960 and 1965.

== Cricket career ==
Mohammad Farooq was one of Pakistan's fastest bowlers in the 1960s, but his career was short. He made his name in 1959–60, his first season of first-class cricket. In his third first-class match, he took 6 for 87 runs and 5 for 98 to bowl Karachi to victory in the final of the Quaid-e-Azam Trophy. He was selected to tour India with the Pakistan team in 1960–61 and played in the first Test, taking the first three Indian wickets and finishing with 4 for 139 from 46 overs. Pakistan, however, replaced him with a batsman for the second Test, and he did not return to the team until the fifth Test, when he took two wickets.

Farooq toured England in 1962. He was successful in the early county matches and took 4 for 70 when included in the team for the second Test at Lord's, including the wickets of Ted Dexter and Ken Barrington, both caught behind off successive balls. He was, however, being asked to do too much bowling and succumbed to injury after the third Test and took no further part in the tour.

After the tour, Farooq played no first-class cricket for more than two years, but returned in the 1964–65 season. After showing good form in domestic cricket he returned to the Test team against the touring New Zealanders. He was the most successful bowler on either side in the three-Test series, taking 10 wickets at an average of 25.30 runs per wicket. In the first Test, at Rawalpindi, he took 2 for 57 and 3 for 25, and going to the crease when Pakistan were 253 for 9, he scored 47 runs, his highest first-class score, in a tenth-wicket partnership of 65 in 54 minutes with Salahuddin. After the third Test of the series, which Pakistan won 2–0, he played no further first-class cricket.
