= S. V. Kumaraswamy =

Indian cricket umpire (born 1918)

Personal information
- Born: 17 February 1918

Umpiring information
- Tests umpired: 1 (1961)
- Source: Cricinfo, 10 July 2013

S. V. Kumaraswamy (born 17 February 1918) was an Indian cricket umpire. He stood in one Test match, India vs. England, in 1961.

== See also ==
- List of Test cricket umpires
- English cricket team in India in 1961–62
