= Surendranath =

Surendranath is a common Indian male name. It may refer to:

- Surendra Nath Kohli (1916–1997), Indian admiral
- Surendra Nath (1926–1994), Punjab governor
- Surendranath Banerjee (1848–1925), Indian National Congress president
- Surendranath (cricketer) (1937–2012), Indian cricketer
- Surendranath Dasgupta (1887–1962), Sanskrit scholar
- Surendranath Medhi (1930–2011), real name of writer Saurabh Kumar Chaliha
- Surendranath Mitra (circa 1850 – 1890), devotee of Sri Ramakrishna Paramahamsa
