= Subhash Gupte =

Indian cricketer

Personal information
- Full name: Subhashchandra Pandharinath Gupte
- Born: 11 December 1929; Bombay, Bombay Presidency, British India
- Died: 31 May 2002 (aged 72); Port-of-Spain, Trinidad and Tobago
- Batting: Right-handed
- Bowling: Legbreak googly
- Relatives: Baloo Gupte (brother)

International information
- National side: India
- Test debut (cap 58): 30 December 1951 v England
- Last Test: 13 December 1961 v England

Domestic team information
- Years: Team
- 1948/49–1958/59: Bombay
- 1953/54–1957/58: Bengal
- 1954–1957: Rishton
- 1958: Heywood
- 1960–1961: Lancaster
- 1960/61–1962/63: Rajasthan
- 1963/64: Trinidad

Career statistics
Competition	Test	First-class
Matches	36	115
Runs scored	183	761
Batting average	6.31	8.18
100s/50s	0/0	0/0
Top score	21	47
Balls bowled	11,284	29,632
Wickets	149	530
Bowling average	29.55	23.71
5 wickets in innings	12	36
10 wickets in match	1	11
Best bowling	9/102	10/78
Catches/stumpings	14/–	52/–
- Source: ESPNcricinfo, 16 March 2017

Subhashchandra Pandharinath "Fergie" Gupte (Marathi: सुभाष गुप्ते) (11 December 1929 – 31 May 2002) was one of Test cricket's finest spin bowlers. Sir Garry Sobers, EAS Prasanna and Jim Laker pronounced him the best leg spinner they had seen.

Gupte flighted and spun the ball sharply, and possessed two different googlies. The West Indians who toured India in 1958/9 reckoned, that Gupte could turn the ball on glass. His only drawback perhaps was that he tended to lose confidence when the batsmen attacked his bowling. In the domestic arena, Gupte played for Bengal, Bombay and Rajasthan in India and for Rishton, Heywood and Lancaster in the UK. He received the C. K. Nayudu Lifetime Achievement Award in 2000, the highest honour bestowed by BCCI on a former player.

== Career ==
Gupte made his debut in 1951–52 and from the next season onward took over from Vinoo Mankad as India's leading spinner. He was nicknamed after the West Indian leg spinner Wilfred Ferguson. Gupte took 27 wickets in West Indies in 1952–53. At Kanpur in 1958–59, he took nine West Indian wickets in an innings for 102 runs, and had Lance Gibbs – the only batsman he missed – dropped by wicket keeper Naren Tamhane. In December 1954, while playing for Bombay against Pakistan Combined Services and Bahawalpur XI, he picked all ten wickets in an innings, returning figures of 10/78. In the process, he became the first Indian to take a ten-wicket haul in first-class cricket.

He had a successful tour of Pakistan in 1954–55 claiming 21 wickets in the five-Test series. Gupte became the second bowler after Vinoo Mankad to claim 100 Test wickets for India when he dismissed Rohan Kanhai in the Second Test of West Indies' 1958–59 tour of India. He picked 34 wickets in four Tests, as many as the combined total of all other bowlers, during New Zealand's 1955–56 India tour. He played his final Test series in Pakistan's 1960–61 tour of India when he appeared in the first three Tests and claimed eight wickets.

In August 1955, Gupte picked up his second ten-wicket haul in an innings (10/101), playing for Rishton in the final of the Lancashire League Worsley Cup against Todmorden. In June 1956, while playing against Accrington in the Lancashire League, he claimed two hat-tricks in one inning's returning figures of 8/19 in 7.3 overs.

=== Career-ending controversy ===
Gupte's international career ended under controversial circumstances during England's 1961–62 tour of India. During the Third Test at the Feroz Shah Kotla in Delhi, the team stayed at the Imperial hotel, where Gupte was housed in room number 7 along with teammate A. G. Kripal Singh. During the stay, a receptionist at the hotel lodged a complaint with the India team manager against inmates of that room, accusing them of calling her over after her shift finished. The pair denied the allegation, with Gupte, who was married at the time, explaining that Singh had merely called and asked for drinks to be brought up.

The matter was taken up by the authorities seriously before both were suspended from the team. Gupte later recollected that, M. A. Chidambaram, the President of the BCCI during the time, did not give him a hearing in Calcutta, the venue of the Fourth Test, as promised. The hearing was eventually held in Madras where the selectors and the BCCI met to pick the squad for the tour of the Caribbean. Gupte was reprimanded by the BCCI secretary A. N. Ghosh for having not stopped Singh from making the call, to which he replied, "He is a big man. How can I stop him?". Both players were dropped from the squad for the tour, and Gupte never played for India again. Gupte's 36-match Test career ended with 149 wickets at an average of 29.55.

In 1981/82, a benefit match was held for Gupte in Sharjah. In 2002, he named Australia's Neil Harvey as the "toughest batsman" he had bowled to.

== Personal life ==
Gupte's brother Baloo was also a leg spinner who played for India.

Gupte met Carol at an official function during his successful 1952–53 tour of the Caribbean with India, which he finished claiming 50 first-class wickets. They married in the late 1950s he moved to Trinidad where his finished his career as a cricketer in 1964. They had a son named Anil, and daughter named Carolyn.
