= Surendranath (cricketer) =

Personal information
- Born: 4 January 1937; Meerut, British India
- Died: 5 May 2012 (aged 75); New Delhi, India
- Batting: Right-handed
- Bowling: Right-arm medium

International information
- National side: India
- Test debut (cap 88): 31 December 1958 v West Indies
- Last Test: 13 January 1961 v Pakistan

Career statistics
Competition	Test	First-class
Matches	11	88
Runs scored	136	1,351
Batting average	10.46	15.70
100s/50s	0/0	1/4
Top score	27	119
Balls bowled	2,602	17,058
Wickets	26	278
Bowling average	40.50	25.37
5 wickets in innings	2	15
10 wickets in match	0	1
Best bowling	5/75	7/14
Catches/stumpings	4/–	32/–
- Source: CricInfo, 1 February 2020

Surendra Nath (4 January 1937 – 5 May 2012) was an Indian cricketer who played in eleven Test matches between 1958 and 1961. He was primarily a medium-pace swing bowler, who enjoyed a particularly successful tour of England in 1959.

An army officer, he played his domestic cricket for Services in a career that extended from 1955–56 to 1968–69. He came to national prominence in 1958–59 when, playing for Services, he dismissed the first three West Indian batsmen in a tour match. He followed that up with 6 for 10 against Patiala, and was selected for the Third Test. He took 2 for 168 in the only West Indies innings, the only Indian bowler to take more than one wicket. He then took 7 for 14 and 6 for 62 against Railways, and retained his position for the Fourth Test. This time he took no wickets in another big West Indian victory, and he lost his place for the Fifth Test.

On the tour of England in 1959 he opened the bowling with Ramakant Desai in all five Tests, and took 16 wickets at 26.62 to lead the Indian bowling averages. In the Fourth Test he took 5 for 115 off 47.1 overs in the first innings, and in the Fifth he took 5 for 75 off 51.3 overs in England's only innings, as well as making his highest Test score of 27, adding 58 for the eighth wicket with Naren Tamhane after India had been 74 for 7 in their first innings. "For one not too well endowed physically he stood up well to many long spells of bowling," noted Wisden, but he "spent hours bowling down the leg side" to a packed leg-side field; "this happy cricketer would help the game if he developed his attack on the off-stump instead of outside the leg-stump".

He played the first two Tests against Australia in 1959–60 but took only two wickets and was omitted from the Test side. After taking 6 for 34 to dismiss Delhi on the first morning of their Ranji Trophy match in December 1960, he returned to the Test team for the Third and Fourth Tests against Pakistan in 1960–61. He had figures of 46–20–93–4 in the first innings of the Third Test, when he once again formed the opening attack with Desai, but took only two more wickets in the next three innings and lost his place again.

He scored his only first-class century in 1961–62, 119 against Southern Punjab, but only 187 runs at 15.58 in the whole season. He also took 22 wickets at 28.04, but was unable to force his way back into the Test team. He played irregularly thereafter, but in five Ranji Trophy matches in 1967–68 he took 25 wickets at 13.44, helping Services reach the semi-finals. In the final zonal match, when Services needed at least a first-innings victory to overtake Railways and make the finals, he took 7 for 59 to dismiss Railways for 114 in reply to Services' 207.
