= Vaman Kumar =

Indian cricketer (born 1935)

Personal information
- Full name: Vaman Viswanath Kumar
- Born: 22 June 1935 (age 91); Madras, British India
- Batting: Right-handed
- Bowling: Legbreak googly

International information
- National side: India
- Test debut (cap 101): 8 February 1961 v Pakistan
- Last Test: 11 November 1961 v England

Domestic team information
- Years: Team
- 1955/56–1976/77: Tamil Nadu

Career statistics
Competition	Test	First-class
Matches	2	129
Runs scored	6	673
Batting average	3.00	7.64
100s/50s	0/0	0/0
Top score	6	31
Balls bowled	605	30,082
Wickets	7	599
Bowling average	28.85	19.98
5 wickets in innings	1	36
10 wickets in match	0	8
Best bowling	5/64	9/76
Catches/stumpings	2/–	40/–
- Source: CricInfo, 20 November 2022

Vaman Viswanath Kumar, often known as V. V. Kumar (born 22 June 1935) is a former Indian cricketer who played in two Test matches in 1961. On his debut he took five wickets in the first innings against Pakistan in Delhi in 1961. Kumar played first-class cricket for Madras/Tamil Nadu from 1955–56 to 1976–77.

== See also ==
- List of India cricketers who have taken five-wicket hauls on Test debut
