= Haseeb Ahsan =

Pakistani cricketer

Personal information
- Born: 15 July 1939; Peshawar, North-West Frontier Province, [British India
- Died: 8 March 2013 (aged 73); Karachi, Sindh, Pakistan
- Batting: Right-handed
- Bowling: Right-arm off spin
- Role: Bowler

International information
- National side: Pakistan
- Test debut (cap 25): 17 January 1958 v West Indies
- Last Test: 2 February 1962 v England

Career statistics
Competition	Test	First-class
Matches	12	49
Runs scored	61	242
Batting average	6.77	5.62
100s/50s	0/0	0/0
Top score	14	36
Balls bowled	2,835	8,244
Wickets	27	142
Bowling average	49.25	27.71
5 wickets in innings	2	13
10 wickets in match	0	2
Best bowling	6/202	8/23
Catches/stumpings	1/–	9/–
- Source: ESPNcricinfo, 26 August 2013

Haseeb Ahsan (Urdu: حسيب احسن; 15 July 1939 – 8 March 2013) was a Pakistani cricketer who played 12 Test matches for Pakistan between 1958 and 1962. A right-arm off spinner, he took 27 wickets in Test cricket at an average of 49.25, including two five-wicket hauls. During his first-class career, he played 49 matches and took 142 wickets at an average of 27.71. Former Pakistan cricketer Waqar Hasan said about him that he "was a fighter to the core and served Pakistan cricket with honour and dignity."

Ahsan had conflicts with former Pakistan captain Javed Burki. A controversy regarding his bowling action resulted in the premature end of his international career when he was only 23. He worked as chief selector, team manager of Pakistan, and member of the 1987 Cricket World Cup organising committee. He died in Karachi on 8 March 2013, aged 73.

== Cricketing career ==
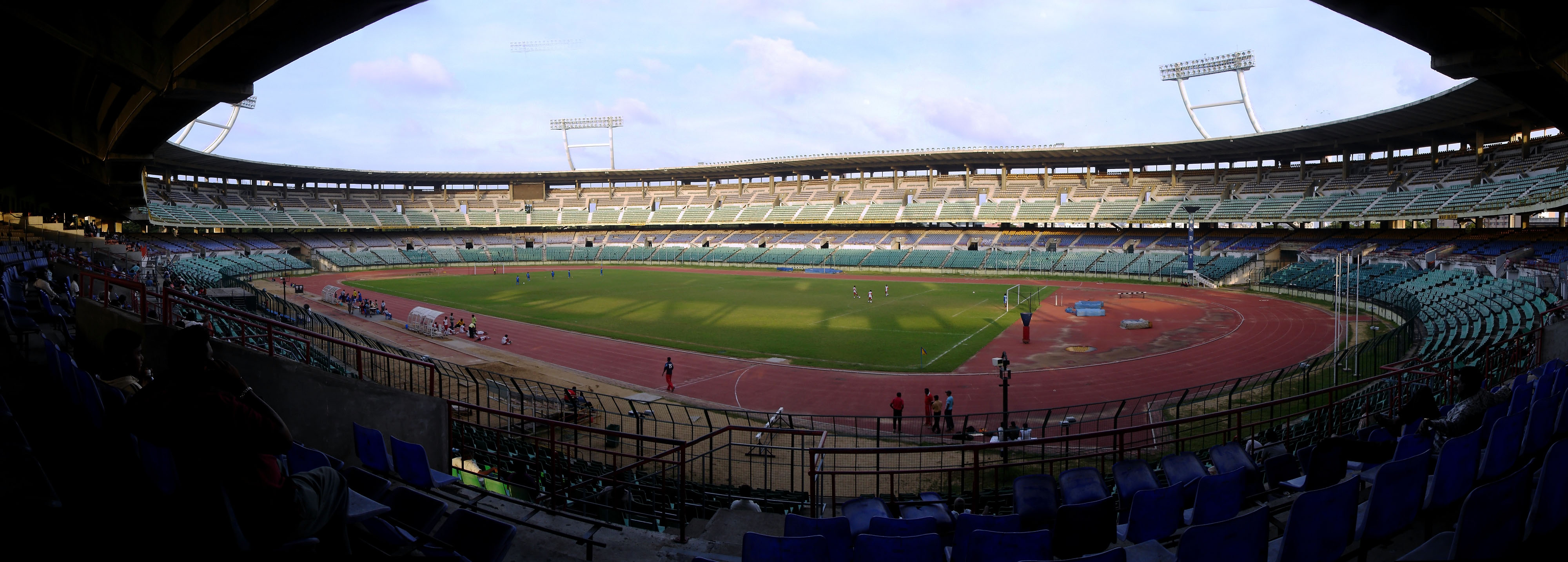
Ahsan achieved his best bowling performance at the Nehru Stadium in 1961.

Ahsan played 49 first-class matches for Pakistan, Karachi, Pakistan International Airlines (PIA), Rawalpindi, Peshawar, and other teams between 1955 and 1963. During his first-class career, he achieved five or more wickets in an innings on thirteen occasions, and ten or more wickets in a match two times.

Ahsan made his first-class debut for North West Frontier Province and Bahawalpur, playing his only match of the season against the Marylebone Cricket Club in 1955–56. He played three matches for Peshawar during 1956–57 where his best bowling figures were against Punjab B, taking eight for 76. In the next season, he was more effective with the ball, taking 43 wickets in nine matches. In the same season, he achieved his best bowling figures in first-class cricket, taking eight for 23 against Punjab B. During the season, Ahsan made his Test debut against the West Indies at the Kensington Oval, in the same match in which Hanif Mohammad scored 337 runs; during the first match of the 1958 series between the teams, Ahsan conceded 84 runs in 21 overs without taking a wicket. He played three matches of the series and took five wickets.

Ahsan took only 14 wickets in the next two first-class seasons; his best bowling figures were five for 51. He was a part of the Pakistan cricket team that toured India in 1960–61, where he played nine matches, including five Tests, and took 24 wickets at an average of 28.75. During the 1960–61 season, Ahsan took 26 wickets, including six for 80 against the West Zone. In Test cricket, he was most successful against India, taking fifteen wickets at an average of 32.66. His best bowling figures were six wickets for 202, against the same team at the Nehru Stadium. During the 1961–62 and 1962 seasons, Ahsan took 28 wickets in ten matches, including a five-wicket haul against Worcestershire. In the next two domestic seasons, he played eight matches and took 12 wickets, including five for 43 runs, against Sargodha cricket team while playing for PIA during the Ayub Trophy. He played his last Test at the National Stadium, Karachi, where he took two wickets conceding 64 runs.

By the end of his career, Ahsan had taken 27 wickets in 12 Test matches at an average of nearly 50, including two five-wicket hauls. He made 61 runs and his highest score was 14.

== Administrative career ==
During the 1980s, Ahsan was the chief selector and manager of the Pakistan cricket team. It was he who first selected Wasim Akram for the series against New Zealand in 1984–85. Akram described him as "a powerful selector, [who] spotted young talent and threw them into the bigger battles". He was Technical Committee's chairman for the 1987 Cricket World Cup and one of the members of the tournament organising committee. During the same tournament, he served as a team manager for Pakistan. In 2003, former Pakistan Cricket Board's (PCB) Tuqir Zia appointed him as President of the Sindh Cricket Association. He was also Ireland's honorary Counsel General and director of Karachi's American Express. PCB chairman Zaka Ashraf said of Ahsan that he was "not only a superb Test cricketer but also was a good administrator who intimately knew the game". He was a member of the panel that heard the appeals opposed to doping bans that were imposed on Shoaib Akhtar and Mohammad Asif. His colleagues described him as a "perfect administrator".

== Personal life and controversies ==
Ahsan was born in Peshawar, North-West Frontier Province (now Khyber Pakhtunkhwa) on 15 July 1939, and was an Urdu-speaker. He was educated at Islamia College, Peshawar. Ahsan was never married. Former Pakistan cricketer, Aftab Baloch, said about Ahsan that he was a "fine gentleman". He had conflicts with former Pakistan captain Javed Burki. A controversy regarding his bowling action arose during a Test match against India. This was the sixth match in which he was "called for throwing." He continued his bowling until the issue reappeared during Pakistan's tour to England in 1962; the controversy ended his international career at the age of 23.

== Death ==
Ahsan suffered from renal failure for two years. He was on dialysis and was admitted at the Aga Khan Hospital, Karachi. President of Karachi City Cricket Association (KCCA) Sirajul Islam Bukhari stated about him that he "fought illness with courage." He died in Karachi on 8 March 2013 at the age of 73. Ahsan was buried at the PECHS graveyard. PCB chairman, chief operating officer Subhan Ahmad and Director General Javed Miandad condoled his death. Chief Minister of the Punjab Shahbaz Sharif "expressed deep sense of grief and sorrow" on his death.
