= Antao D'Souza =

Pakistani cricketer (born 1939)

Personal information
- Full name: Antao D'Souza
- Born: 17 January 1939 (age 87); Nagoa, Goa, Portuguese India
- Batting: Right-handed
- Bowling: Right-arm medium; Right-arm off-break
- Role: All-rounder

International information
- National side: Pakistan
- Test debut (cap 29): 20 February 1959 v West Indies
- Last Test: 20 August 1962 v England

Career statistics
Competition	Test	First-class
Matches	6	61
Runs scored	76	815
Batting average	38.00	18.95
100s/50s	0/0	0/0
Top score	23*	45
Balls bowled	1,587	11,738
Wickets	17	190
Bowling average	43.82	26.03
5 wickets in innings	1	12
10 wickets in match	0	1
Best bowling	5/112	7/33
Catches/stumpings	3/–	20/–
- Source: Cricinfo, 29 October 2012

Antao D'Souza (born 17 January 1939) is a Pakistani former cricketer who played in six Test matches for the Pakistan cricket team, from 1959 to 1962. He was the second of the four Christians who have played Test cricket for Pakistan. He was a medium pace bowler and obdurate tail-end batsman.

Born and raised in Nagoa, Salcete, Goa (at the time part of Portuguese India), D'Souza's father emigrated to Karachi, Pakistan, at the time of independence in 1947, where D'Souza attended St Patrick's High School. His brothers, Vincent D'Souza and Joseph D'Souza, also played first-class cricket.

D'Souza toured England in 1962, heading the batting averages (53) as he remained not out in five of his six innings. His bowling was as ineffective as everyone else on that tour, which Pakistan lost 0–4. Domestically, D'Souza played for Pakistan International Airlines, Karachi Blues, Karachi, and Peshawar.

Given a minimum of ten innings, D'Souza is one of only two Test cricketers whose batting average exceeds their highest score. The other is the Indian cricketer Sadashiv Shinde.

In 1999, D'Souza migrated with his wife and their four children to Ontario, Canada.
