= S. K. Raghunatha Rao =

Indian cricket umpire (1922–1991)

Personal information
- Born: 10 November 1922
- Died: 13 December 1991 (aged 69)

Umpiring information
- Tests umpired: 7 (1961–1967)
- Source: Cricinfo, 7 June 2019

S. K. Raghunatha Rao (10 November 1922 – 13 December 1991) was an Indian cricket umpire. He stood in seven Test matches between 1961 and 1967.

== See also ==
- List of Test cricket umpires
