= Saeed Ahmed (cricketer) =

Pakistani preacher and cricketer (1937–2024)

Personal information
- Full name: Saeed Ahmed
- Born: 1 October 1937; Jalandhar, Punjab Province, British India
- Died: 20 March 2024 (aged 86)
- Batting: Right-handed
- Bowling: Right-arm offbreak
- Relatives: Younis Ahmed

International information
- National side: Pakistan
- Test debut (cap 27): 17 January 1958 v West Indies
- Last Test: 29 December 1972 v Australia

Career statistics
| Competition | Tests | First-class |
|---|---|---|
| Matches | 41 | 213 |
| Runs scored | 2,991 | 12,847 |
| Batting average | 40.41 | 40.02 |
| 100s/50s | 5/16 | 34/51 |
| Top score | 172 | 203* |
| Balls bowled | 1,980 | 18,879 |
| Wickets | 22 | 332 |
| Bowling average | 36.45 | 24.75 |
| 5 wickets in innings | 0 | 15 |
| 10 wickets in match | 0 | 2 |
| Best bowling | 4/64 | 8/41 |
| Catches/stumpings | 13/– | 122/– |
- Source: Cricinfo, 13 June 2016

Pride of Performance Award Recipient
- Date: 1962
- Country: Islamic Republic of Pakistan
- Presented by: Islamic Republic of Pakistan

Saeed Ahmed (Urdu: سعید احمد; 1 October 1937 – 20 March 2024) was a Pakistani Test cricketer who captained the national team, and later became a preacher and member of Tablighi Jamaat.

Born in 1937 at Jalandhar in what was then British Punjab, part of British India and educated at Government Islamia College in Lahore, Saeed's brother Younis Ahmed also played cricket for Pakistan.

A right-handed middle order batsman with a powerful drive who bowled off-breaks, Saeed made his Test début on 17 January 1958 against West Indies at Kensington Oval, Bridgetown, Barbados. He made 65 in the second innings, at one stage partnering with Hanif Mohammad who went on to make 337. Saeed finished the series with 508 runs.

Saeed captained his side in three drawn Tests in 1968–69 but his career ended in controversial circumstances when he declared himself unfit for the third Test against Australia in 1972 due to what he claimed was a back injury. In the previous Test, he had been involved in a heated altercation with Australian fast bowler Dennis Lillee and the Pakistan management was sceptical about Saeed's injury. In all, Saeed played 41 Tests, scoring 2991 runs at 40.41 and taking 22 wickets at 36.45.

== Personal life and death ==
Saeed married renowned businesswoman Begum Salma Ahmed, a relative of Pakistani diplomat Shahryar Khan, and became involved in the business.

In 1980, he quit his cricket and business careers and joined Tablighi Jamaat as a preacher.

Saeed Ahmed died on 20 March 2024, at the age of 86.

== Records ==
- Fastest Pakistani Cricketer to reach 1,000 test runs (20 innings).

| Preceded by Hanif Mohammad | Pakistan Cricket Captain; 1968–1969 | Succeeded by Intikhab Alam |
| Preceded by Des Hoare | Nelson Cricket Club; Professional; 1965–1966 | Succeeded by Neil Hawke |
