= David Allen (cricketer) =

English cricketer (1935–2014)

- Allen in 1962

Personal information
- Full name: David Arthur Allen
- Born: 29 October 1935; Horfield, Bristol, England
- Died: 24 May 2014 (aged 78); Thornbury, Gloucestershire, England
- Batting: Right-handed
- Bowling: Right arm off-break

International information
- National side: England
- Test debut: 6 January 1960 v West Indies
- Last Test: 4 June 1966 v West Indies

Career statistics
Competition	Tests	First-class
Matches	39	456
Runs scored	918	9,291
Batting average	25.50	18.80
100s/50s	0/5	1/29
Top score	88	121*
Balls bowled	11,297	77,619
Wickets	122	1,209
Bowling average	30.97	23.64
5 wickets in innings	4	56
10 wickets in match	0	8
Best bowling	5/30	8/34
Catches/stumpings	10/–	252/–
- Source: CricInfo, 28 February 2019

David Arthur Allen (29 October 1935 – 24 May 2014) was an English cricketer who played first-class cricket for Gloucestershire between 1953 and 1972. He also played 39 Test matches for England between 1960 and 1966.

== Life and career ==
A right-arm off-break bowler, using a very short run, Allen was first selected for England in 1959 and in 1960 was selected as the Cricket Writers' Club Young Cricketer of the Year. Allen toured all the then-current Test-playing nations. He was a decent bat, his Test average higher than the all-rounders Fred Titmus and Ray Illingworth, and in the 1963 Lord's Test against the West Indies, he notably played out the final two balls of Wes Hall's last over for a draw. Allen had protected Colin Cowdrey at the other end, who was pressed in to bat with his broken arm in plaster. In the 1965–66 Ashes series Allen made 50 not out in the Third Test at Sydney, adding 93 for the last two wickets, and took 2/42 and 4/47 as England won by an innings and 93 runs.

Allen was also famous for being taken off against Australia. In the decisive Fourth Test at Old Trafford in 1961 he took three quick wickets to have Australia nine wickets down, but Alan Davidson hit him for 20 runs in an over and Peter May took him off. Davidson and Graham McKenzie added 98 for the last wicket and Australia won by 54 runs. Nevertheless, in six winters, Allen completed the set of playing against all the other Test playing nations of the time. In India and Pakistan in 1961–62, he bowled 482 overs in the eight Test matches alone.

Allen came close to developing into an all-rounder on the level of his contemporary Fred Titmus. Playing fairly regularly for England throughout the first half of the 1960s, after 1966 he found it increasingly difficult to score enough runs or get enough bowling at county level as trends changed. Gloucestershire used three spin bowlers from the 1950s onwards but by the end of the 1960s Mike Bissex and Allen were effectively doing the work of one bowler. Though Bissex lost form, the advent of Sadiq Mohammad, a useful leg spinner, saw Allen fade away from the county side in 1972. Cricket commentator Colin Bateman noted that "towards the end of his 20 summers at Bristol his relationship with skipper Tony Brown, with whom he had grown up on a cricket field, became strained. Allen even found himself left out of his own benefit match".

After he retired from cricket, Allen worked as an area manager for the Bristol wine merchants Harveys and then for Allied Domecq. He was a member of the Gloucestershire County Cricket Club committee, and was elected club president in 2011. He died in May 2014, survived by his wife Joyce and their son and daughter.
