= Datta Gaekwad =

Indian cricketer (1928–2024)

Personal information
- Full name: Dattajirao Krishnarao Gaekwad
- Born: 27 October 1928; Baroda, Baroda State, India
- Died: 13 February 2024 (aged 95); Baroda, Gujarat, India
- Batting: Right-handed
- Bowling: Right-arm medium, legbreak
- Relatives: Anshuman Gaekwad (son)

International information
- National side: India (1952–1961)
- Test debut (cap 60): 5 June 1952 v England
- Last Test: 13 January 1961 v Pakistan

Domestic team information
- Years: Team
- 1948–1963: Baroda

Career statistics
Competition	Tests	First-class
Matches	11	110
Runs scored	350	5,788
Batting average	18.42	36.40
100s/50s	0/1	17/23
Top score	52	249*
Balls bowled	12	1,964
Wickets	0	25
Bowling average	–	40.64
5 wickets in innings	0	0
10 wickets in match	0	0
Best bowling	–	4/117
Catches/stumpings	5/–	49/–
- Source: ESPNcricinfo

Dattajirao Krishnarao Gaekwad (27 October 1928 – 13 February 2024), known as Datta Gaekwad, was an Indian cricketer. He appeared in 11 Test matches, toured England in 1952 and 1959 and West Indies in 1952–53. He captained the Indian team on the 1959 tour. As a batsman Gaekwad "possessed a sure defence and delightfully crisp shots especially through the covers". He was also an occasional leg spin bowler. Until his death, he was India's oldest living Test cricketer.

== Biography ==
Gaekwad played his early cricket for Bombay University and the Maharaja Sayaji University in Baroda. He made his Test debut in the first Test of 1952 tour of England, in Leeds. He opened the innings for India despite never having done so before the tour. He was one among four victims dismissed for no score in the second innings of the Test. His West Indies tour in the next year was terminated during the second Test when he collided with Vijay Hazare while going for a catch and dislocated his shoulder.

In 1957–58, he captained Baroda to their first Ranji Trophy title in nine years, scoring a century in the final against Services. He scored 218 against the defending champions Bombay during the course of the season. He was recalled to the Indian team for the final Test against West Indies in 1958–59. His 52 in the second innings was the only Test fifty of his career and went some way towards India earning a draw.

India had had four captains in the series against West Indies, and with Hemu Adhikari, the captain in the Fifth Test, being unavailable, Gaekwad was appointed to lead the Indian team on the tour of England in 1959. Between his selection and the beginning of the tour, he contracted typhoid, and was never fully fit during the tour. He still played in 23 of the 33 first-class matches and was one of the team's leading scorers, with 1174 runs at an average of 34.52. He played in four of the five Tests, but scored only 128 runs at an average of 16.00. India lost all five Tests, and Gaekwad appeared in only one more Test. Wisden's summary of the tour said that he appeared not to have "the verve and personality" for the task, and that a "more active approach", especially in field placing, might have been more successful. It added: "There were times when his cover fielding was brilliant, and his innings of 176 against Yorkshire at Sheffield made many wonder why he was not more successful."

In the Ranji Trophy he scored 3,139 runs with 14 centuries and a highest of 249 against Maharashtra in 1959–60.

=== Personal life and death ===
Gaekwad was the father of the Indian opener Anshuman Gaekwad. He was distantly related to the Baroda royal family and served as the Deputy Comptroller to the Baroda state. On the death of Deepak Shodhan in May 2016 he became India's oldest living Test cricketer. He died in Baroda, Gujarat on 13 February 2024, at the age of 95.

== Sources ==
- Rajan Bala, The Covers are Off. Bala suggests that one of the reasons for the fiasco of the 1959 tour was the resentment of Bombay players towards those from Baroda.

Preceded by Hemu Adhikari	Indian National Test Cricket Captain; 1959 (1 Match)	Succeeded by Pankaj Roy
Preceded by Pankaj Roy	Indian National Test Cricket Captain; 1959	Succeeded by Gulabrai Ramchand
