= Pankaj Roy =

Indian cricketer

- Pankaj Roy (left) and Vinoo Mankad returning to the pavilion after their world record opening partnership of 413 runs, Madras, 11 January 1956. Their record stood for 52 years.

Personal information
- Born: 31 May 1928; Dacca, Bengal Presidency, British India
- Died: 4 February 2001 (aged 72); Kolkata, West Bengal, India
- Batting: Right-handed
- Bowling: Right-arm medium
- Relatives: Nemailal Roy (brother); Pranab Roy (son); Ambar Roy (nephew)

International information
- National side: India
- Test debut (cap 54): 2 November 1951 v England
- Last Test: 2 December 1960 v Pakistan

Career statistics
Competition	Test	First-class
Matches	43	185
Runs scored	2,442	11,868
Batting average	32.56	42.38
100s/50s	5/9	33/50
Top score	173	202*
Balls bowled	104	1,146
Wickets	1	21
Bowling average	66.00	30.85
5 wickets in innings	0	1
10 wickets in match	0	0
Best bowling	1/6	5/53
Catches/stumpings	16/–	74/–
- Source: CricInfo, 5 March 2017

Pankaj Roy (31 May 1928 – 4 February 2001) was an Indian cricketer who played in 43 Test matches, including once as captain. He was a right-handed opening batsman, perhaps best known for establishing the world record opening partnership in Test cricket of 413 runs, together with Vinoo Mankad, against New Zealand at Chennai. The record stood for 52 years until 2008. Roy played for Bengal in domestic matches. In 2000, he was appointed as the Sheriff of Kolkata. He has been honoured with the Padma Shri. His nephew Ambar Roy and son Pranab Roy also played Test cricket for India. He was a student of Vidyasagar College. In 2016, he was posthumously awarded the C. K. Nayudu Lifetime Achievement Award, the highest honour conferred by BCCI on a former player.

== First-class career ==
Roy played domestic cricket in India for the Bengal cricket team. He scored a century on his first-class debut in 1946–47 and went on to score 33 hundreds, scoring a total of 11868 first class runs at 42.38.

== Test career ==
When England toured India in 1951, Roy was selected for the Indian squad and made his Test debut at Delhi. Despite making just 12 in his debut innings he scored 2 centuries in the series. The following summer he toured England and had a contrasting series, making 5 ducks in his 7 innings, including Frank Tyson's debut first class wicket. This tally included a pair at Old Trafford. He was among the four victims (others being Datta Gaekwad, Vijay Manjrekar and Madhav Mantri) in India's miserable 0–4 start in the second innings of the Headingley Test of 1952 with Fred Trueman playing havoc. He would hit five Test centuries for India, with a top score of 173.

He captained India in a Test match in England in 1959, which India lost.

Preceded by Datta Gaekwad	Indian National Test Cricket Captain; 1959 (1 Test Match)	Succeeded by Datta Gaekwad
