= Alimuddin (cricketer) =

Pakistani cricketer (1930–2012)

- Alimuddin in 1962

Personal information
- Born: 15 December 1930; Ajmer, British India (now India)
- Died: 12 July 2012 (aged 81); Harrow, London, England
- Batting: Right-handed
- Bowling: Right-arm leg-break
- Role: Opening batsman

International information
- National side: Pakistan (1954–1962)
- Test debut (cap 15): 10 June 1954 v England
- Last Test: 26 July 1962 v England

Domestic team information
- Years: Team
- 1943: Rajputana
- 1944–1947: Gujarat
- 1946: Muslims
- 1948: Sind
- 1953–1954: Bahawalpur
- 1954–1965: Karachi
- 1956–1957: Karachi Whites
- 1957: Karachi "A"
- 1961–1966: Karachi Blues
- 1967–1968: Public Works Department

Career statistics
Competition	Tests	First-class
Matches	25	140
Runs scored	1091	7275
Batting average	25.37	32.77
100s/50s	2/7	14/38
Top score	109	142
Balls bowled	84	1472
Wickets	1	40
Bowling average	75.00	23.97
5 wickets in innings	–	–
10 wickets in match	–	–
Best bowling	1/17	4/33
Catches/stumpings	8/–	65/–
- Source: ESPNcricinfo, 29 August 2012

Alimuddin (Urdu: علیم الدین; 15 December 1930 – 12 July 2012) was a Pakistani cricketer who played 25 Tests for Pakistan between 1954 and 1962. His name is sometimes rendered Alim-ud-Din. A fast-scoring, right-handed opening batsman and occasional right-arm leg break bowler, he was the youngest player ever to appear in first-class cricket, aged 12 years and 73 days. In international cricket, he scored 1,091 runs at the average of 25.37, including two centuries and seven fifties. In 1954, he was a member of the Pakistani squad which toured England and recorded Pakistan's first Test match win. Former Pakistani captain Mushtaq Mohammad said about him that he was "a thorough gentleman as well as a great cricketer for Pakistan".

== Personal life ==
Alimuddin was an ethnic Muhajir, born in Ajmer, a city in British India, on 15 December 1930. After the independence of Pakistan in 1947, he moved to Karachi along with his family. He lived in London and never married, instead providing for his family. Pakistan International Airlines (PIA) had given him an opportunity to work at London Heathrow Airport. Two of his brothers, Salimuddin and Azimuddin, both also played first-class cricket. His nephew, James Uddin, the son of Salimuddin, is also a cricketer and currently plays semi-professional cricket in England.

In later life, his pension was suspended after doubts over his actual birth date. The pension was restored after intervention from the Pakistani President.

== First-class career ==
During his career Alimuddin played 140 first-class matches and scored 7,275 runs, with the average of 32.77, including 14 centuries and 38 fifties; he also took 40 wickets. Critics considered him to be an excellent fielder. He made his debut for Rajasthan aged only 12 years 73 days, becoming the youngest player to have played first-class cricket. In 1942–43, he played his maiden match in the Ranji Trophy, scoring 13 and 27 runs in his two innings. His highest score in first-class cricket was 142, against Worcestershire in 1954. Domestically, Alimuddin represented Sindh, Rajasthan, Karachi, Bahawalpur and Gujarat, and became the first Pakistani batsman to face a ball bowled by an international bowler on Pakistani soil, in a match between the Sindh and West Indians in 1948. During Pakistan's 1954 tour of England, Alimuddin scored more than 700 runs, including two centuries in the first two matches. He was most successful during 1961–62, scoring 1,020 runs in 12 matches at an average of 51.00. In the same season he captained Karachi, leading the team to victories in the Quaid-e-Azam Trophy and Ayub Zonal Trophy. His final season in first-class cricket was 1967–68.

== International career ==
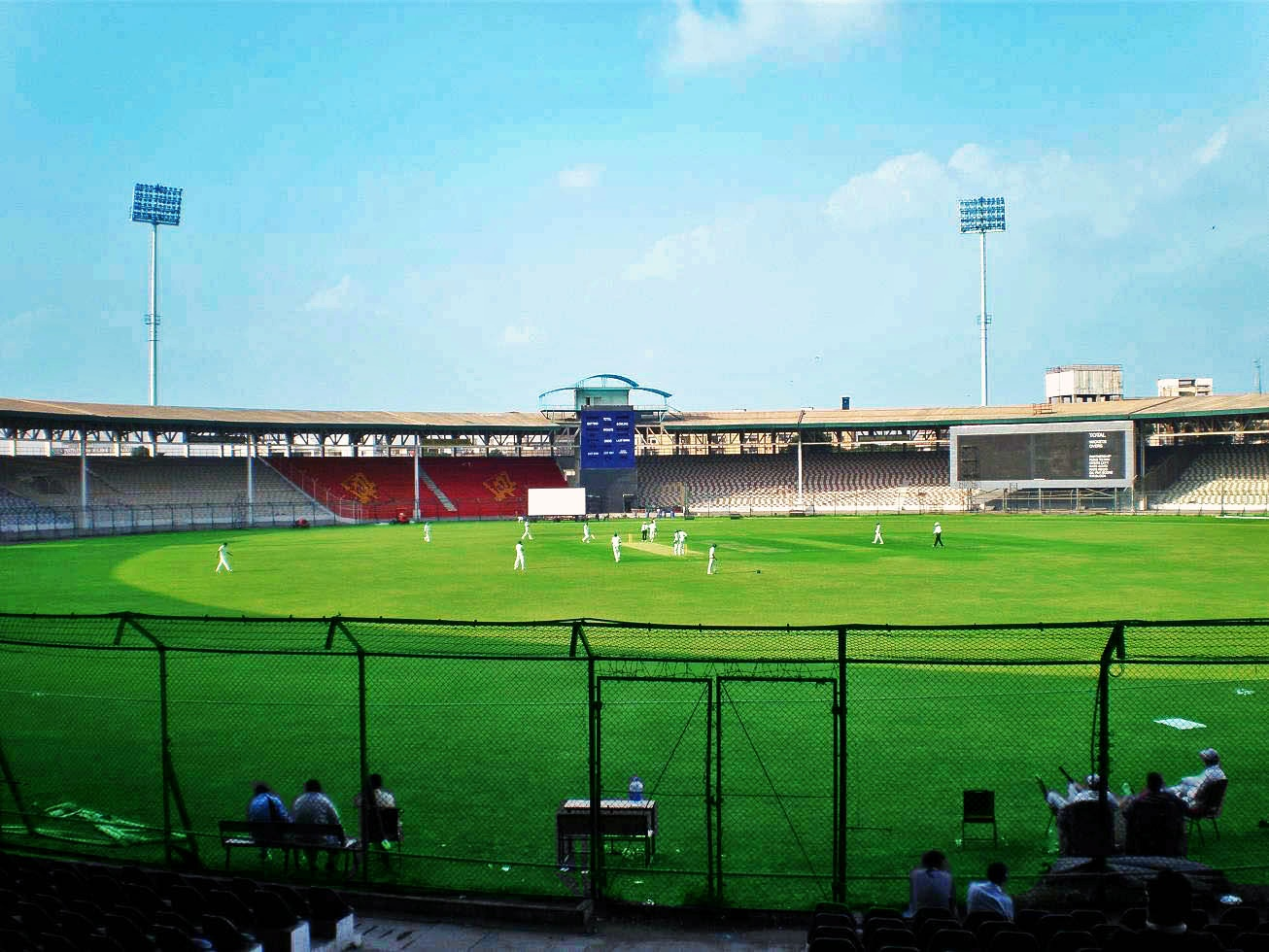
Alimuddin made both of his centuries at the National Stadium, Karachi.

Alimuddin played 25 Test matches for Pakistan during his career and scored 1,091 runs in international cricket at the average of 25.37. He made two centuries and seven fifties. Cricket critics believed that he possessed a sound technique. In Test matches, Alimuddin established an effective opening partnership with Hanif Mohammad.

Alimuddin started his international career against England in June 1954, at the Lord's Cricket Ground, in a match in which he scored 19 runs. In the fourth Test of the same series Pakistan beat England by 24 runs, recording their first Test win over them to become the first team to defeat England during their maiden tour. Alimuddin managed to score 10 runs in the match. In 1954–55, he played, against India, in Pakistan's first home Tests, finishing the series as the leading run scorer with 332; he made three fifties and in the fifth match scored 103 not out at the National Stadium, Karachi, his first international century. He was the first batsman ever to make an international century on the Ground.

Alimuddin also toured West Indies as a part of Pakistan cricket team in 1957–58. He was not successful in the series and his highest score remained 41 runs which he made in the fourth Test at the Bourda, Georgetown, Guyana. In 1962, under the captaincy of Javed Burki, Pakistan visited England where they played a five Test match series. In the fifth Test at Headingley, a low scoring match for Pakistan, Alimuddin's scores of 50 and 60 made him the team's highest scorer of the match. In the fifth Test of the home series against England in 1962, he scored his career best 109 runs at the National Stadium. He played his last match against England in Trent Bridge, Nottingham in 1962.

Former West Indian all-rounder Collie Smith was his only wicket in international cricket.

He is variously known as "Alim-ud-Din" and "Alimuddin", with Wisden using the former in earlier editions and the latter in his obituary.

== Death ==
On 12 July 2012, Alimuddin died in Northwick Park Hospital, Harrow, London. He suffered from heart and lung diseases. He also had kidney failure and was on dialysis. The Pakistan Cricket Board (PCB) released a press statement expressing sorrow and conveying condolences to Alimuddin's family.

== Career statistics ==
=== Records against opponents ===
Key

- Inn – Number of innings batted
- NO – Number of innings not out
- Runs – Runs scored in career
- HS – Highest score
- * – Batsman remained not out
- 100 – Number of centuries scored
- 50 – Number of half centuries scored
- Avg – Runs scored per dismissal
- Ca – Catches taken
- St – Stumpings taken
- H/A/N – Venue was at home (Pakistan), away or neutral
- Date – Match starting day
- Result – Result for the Pakistan team

Alimuddin's performance in Test matches
Opponent	Matches	inn	NO	Runs	HS	Ave	100	50	Ct	St
Australia	2	4	1	59	34*	19.66	0	0	1	–
England	8	16	0	410	109	25.62	1	4	2	–
India	6	10	1	356	103*	39.55	1	3	0	–
New Zealand	3	4	3	74	37	18.50	0	0	4	–
West Indies	6	11	0	192	41	17.45	0	0	1	–
Total	25	45	2	1091	109	25.37	2	7	8	–

=== Test centuries ===
Alimuddin's Test centuries
No.	Score	Against	Pos.	Inn.	Venue	H/A/N	Date	Result
1	103	India	2	3	National Stadium, Karachi	Home	26 February 1955	Drawn
2	109	West Indies	6	1	National Stadium, Karachi	Home	2 February 1962	Drawn

Preceded by Mohammad Ramzan (12 years and 247 days)	Youngest first-class cricketer (12 years and 73 days); 26 February 1943 – present	Incumbent
