= Mahmood Hussain (cricketer) =

Pakistani cricketer (1932–1991)

- Mahmood Hussain in 1962

Personal information
- Born: 2 April 1932; Lahore, Punjab, British India
- Died: 25 December 1991 (aged 59); Northwick Park, London, England
- Batting: Right-handed
- Bowling: Right-arm fast-medium

International information
- National side: Pakistan (1952–1962)
- Test debut (cap 12): 23 October 1952 v India
- Last Test: 5 July 1962 v England

Career statistics
| Competition | Test | First-class |
|---|---|---|
| Matches | 27 | 97 |
| Runs scored | 336 | 1,160 |
| Batting average | 10.18 | 10.94 |
| 100s/50s | 0/0 | 0/1 |
| Top score | 35 | 50 |
| Balls bowled | 5,910 | 18,538 |
| Wickets | 68 | 329 |
| Bowling average | 38.64 | 25.28 |
| 5 wickets in innings | 2 | 19 |
| 10 wickets in match | 0 | 3 |
| Best bowling | 6/67 | 8/95 |
| Catches/stumpings | 5/– | 31/– |
- Source: CricInfo, 12 July 2019

Mahmood Hussain (2 April 1932 – 25 December 1991) was a Pakistani cricketer who played in 27 Test matches from 1952 to 1962. He was a fast medium bowler who partnered with Fazal Mahmood, after Khan Mohammad retired from Test cricket. He made an unforgettable 35 at the Ferozshah Kotla, New Delhi in 1961, which saved Pakistan from certain defeat.
