= Intikhab Alam =

Former Pakistani cricketer and coach

Personal information
- Born: 28 December 1941 (age 84); Hoshiarpur, Punjab, British India
- Batting: Right-handed
- Bowling: Right arm leg break
- Role: All-rounder

International information
- National side: Pakistan (1959–1977)
- Test debut (cap 34): 4 December 1959 v Australia
- Last Test: 4 March 1977 v West Indies
- ODI debut (cap 3): 11 February 1973 v New Zealand
- Last ODI: 16 October 1976 v New Zealand

Career statistics
Competition	Test	ODIs	FC
Matches	47	4	489
Runs scored	1,493	17	14,331
Batting average	22.28	8.50	22.14
100s/50s	1/8	0/0	9/67
Top score	138	10	182
Balls bowled	10,474	158	91,735
Wickets	125	4	1,571
Bowling average	35.95	29.50	27.67
5 wickets in innings	5	0	85
10 wickets in match	2	0	13
Best bowling	7/52	2/36	8/54
Catches/stumpings	20/–	0/–	228/–
Medal record
Men's Cricket
Representing Pakistan as Coach
ICC Cricket World Cup
Winner	1992 Australia and New Zealand
ICC T20 World Cup
Winner	2009 England
- Source: ESPNcricinfo, 11 June 2013

Intikhab Alam Khan (Urdu: انتخاب عالم خان; born 28 December 1941) is a Pakistani cricket coach and former cricketer who played in 47 Test matches and four One Day Internationals from 1959 to 1977. He captained Pakistan in 17 Tests between 1969 and 1975. He also played in English county cricket for Surrey between 1969 and 1981. Prior to this, Intikhab was professional for several years at West of Scotland Cricket Club in Glasgow and also coached at The Glasgow Academy. In August 1967, at the Oval, he joined Asif Iqbal for a ninth-wicket stand of 190 runs. This remained a world record for around 30 years.

Intikhab was Pakistan's first One Day International cricket captain. He played 3 matches as captain, winning two and losing one. He was the manager of the Pakistan teams that won the 1992 Cricket World Cup and the 2009 ICC World Twenty20.

In 2004, he was appointed the first foreigner to coach a domestic Indian cricket team, coaching Punjab in the Ranji Trophy.

On 25 October 2008, he was once again named manager of the Pakistan cricket team by PCB, a day after Australian Geoff Lawson was sacked as the national coach of Pakistan.

In 2009, Intikhab was the manager of the team when Pakistan had their first Twenty20 World Cup title by defeating Sri Lanka in the final.

Sporting positions
Preceded by Saeed Ahmed	Pakistan Cricket Captain; 1969–1973	Succeeded by Majid Khan
Preceded by Majid Khan	Pakistan Cricket Captain; 1974–1976	Succeeded by Mushtaq Mohammad
Preceded by Geoff Lawson	Pakistani national cricket coach 2008–2010	Succeeded by Waqar Younis
