= Wallis Mathias =

Pakistani cricketer (1935–1994)

Personal information
- Born: 4 February 1935; Karachi, British India
- Died: 1 September 1994 (aged 59); Karachi, Pakistan
- Batting: Right-handed
- Bowling: Right-arm medium

International information
- National side: Pakistan
- Test debut (cap 23): 7 November 1955 v New Zealand
- Last Test: 16 August 1962 v England

Career statistics
Competition	Test	First-class
Matches	21	146
Runs scored	783	7,520
Batting average	23.72	44.49
100s/50s	0/3	16/41
Top score	77	278*
Balls bowled	24	1,090
Wickets	0	13
Bowling average	–	40.92
5 wickets in innings	–	0
10 wickets in match	–	0
Best bowling	–	2/4
Catches/stumpings	22/–	130/–
- Source: Cricinfo, 13 June 2016

Wallis Mathias (4 February 1935 – 1 September 1994) was a Pakistani cricketer who played in 21 Test matches from 1955 to 1962. A Catholic, he was the first non-Muslim cricketer to play for Pakistan. He belonged to Karachi's Goan community.

The son of a porter at the Karachi Gymkhana Club, Mathias was a stylish right-handed middle-order batsman. He made three half centuries in his Test career, all of them against West Indies. In the Second Test against West Indies in Dacca in 1958–59, he top-scored in each innings with 64 and 45, as Pakistan won a low-scoring match by 41 runs.

He was also a gifted slip fielder with exceptional reflexes, whose "great skill was to make hard chances look simple". According to Imtiaz Ahmed, the Test wicket-keeper at the time, he was Pakistan's first good slip fielder, who "changed the atmosphere in the slip cordon", which previously had been the domain of players "who did not want to run".

He was a prolific run scorer in Pakistani domestic cricket. After he returned from the tour of England in 1962, in the next four years he made 1357 runs in 13 matches at an average of 113.08, including his career-best score of 278 not out for Karachi Blues against Railways Greens in 1965–66. Four years later he joined the newly formed National Bank cricket team and became their first ever captain, playing for them until 1976-77 and later coaching the side. In 146 first-class matches he made 7,520 runs, average 44.49, including 16 centuries. He held 130 catches, 22 in Tests.

Mathias died of a brain haemorrhage in 1994, aged 59.

== Education ==
He was educated at the St. Patrick's High School, Karachi.
