= Naren Tamhane =

Indian cricketer (1931–2002)

Personal information
- Full name: Narendra Shankar Tamhane
- Born: 4 August 1931; Bombay, British India
- Died: 19 March 2002 (aged 70); Mumbai, Maharashtra, India
- Batting: Right-handed
- Role: Wicket-keeper

International information
- National side: India
- Test debut (cap 72): 1 January 1955 v Pakistan
- Last Test: 30 December 1960 v Pakistan

Career statistics
| Competition | Test | First-class |
|---|---|---|
| Matches | 21 | 93 |
| Runs scored | 225 | 1,459 |
| Batting average | 10.22 | 18.23 |
| 100s/50s | 0/1 | 1/5 |
| Top score | 54* | 109* |
| Balls bowled | – | 66 |
| Wickets | – | 2 |
| Bowling average | – | 21.50 |
| 5 wickets in innings | – | 0 |
| 10 wickets in match | – | 0 |
| Best bowling | – | 2/43 |
| Catches/stumpings | 35/16 | 174/79 |
- Source: ESPNcricinfo, 20 November 2022

Narendra Shankar Tamhane (4 August 1931 – 19 March 2002) was an Indian cricketer who played in 21 Test matches from 1955 to 1960. He was a wicket-keeper-batsman.

His first-class career extended from 1951–52 to 1968–69. He played in the Ranji Trophy for Bombay from 1953–54 to 1963–64.

Later he served on the selection committees for Mumbai and India which selected Sachin Tendulkar for first-class and international cricket.

Tamhane studied at the Siddharth College of Arts, Science and Commerce in Fort, Mumbai.
