= List of East Pakistan first-class cricketers =

The team nominally represented the Pakistani province of East Pakistan (present-day borders of Bangladesh pictured), although often included players from other provinces.

A total of 67 players represented the East Pakistan cricket team in first-class matches between the team's debut in November 1954 and its final completed match in September 1969. Representing East Pakistan (East Bengal prior to 1955), a former provincial state of the Islamic Republic of Pakistan, the team can be considered a direct predecessor to the present national cricket team of Bangladesh, which declared independence in 1971. Prior to the partition of India in August 1947, cricketers from the region that is now Bangladesh generally played for Bengal, which had been active in Ranji Trophy matches since the 1935–36 season.

Most of the team's matches at first-class level came in the domestic Quaid-e-Azam Trophy, while others were played in the Ayub Trophy or against touring international sides. The team first played in the Quaid-e-Azam Trophy during the 1954–55 season, but did not appear again until the 1959–60 season, subsequently going on to field a team for seven consecutive tournaments (incorporating the 1961–62 to 1970–71 seasons). For other tournaments the province was split into several sides, including East Pakistan "A" and "B" and the East Pakistan Greens and Whites. Several other sides primarily fielding East Pakistani players also participated in Pakistani domestic competitions. In total, East Pakistan played 20 matches at first-class level, although two of these were abandoned without a ball being bowled.

As regional Pakistani cricket teams were almost exclusively amateur at the time, the composition of the team was often highly unstable. Of the 67 players for East Pakistan, 26 played only a single match for the team, while only two played more than ten matches—Abdul Latif, the team's highest-scoring batsman, played fifteen matches, captaining the side in ten, and Daulat Zaman played eleven. East Pakistan often fielded high-quality players from West Pakistan who had re-located to the province for employment or business commitments. These included six Test cricketers—Mahmood Hussain, Mohammad Munaf, Mufassir-ul-Haq, Nasim-ul-Ghani, Naushad Ali, and Niaz Ahmed No native East Pakistanis, Bengali or otherwise, represented Pakistan's national side at Test level. The closest was Raqibul Hasan, who was twelfth man against the touring New Zealanders during the 1969–70 season, and the following season represented a full-strength Pakistan side against a Commonwealth XI. Raqibul went on to serve as Bangladesh's inaugural captain in the 1979 ICC Trophy, and later played two One Day International (ODI) matches for the team. Two other East Pakistan players went on to play for Bangladesh in ICC Trophy matches—Ashraful Haque and Shafiqul Haque.

== Key ==
General

- ‡ – served as captain
- † – served as wicket-keeper
- No. – order of appearance
- M – total numbers of matches for East Pakistan

Batting

- Runs – total runs scored
- HS – highest score
- 100 – centuries scored
- 50 – half-centuries scored
- Avg – batting average (runs scored per dismissal)
- * – denotes not out innings

Bowling

- W – total wickets taken
- BB – best bowling in an innings
- Ave – bowling average (average runs per wicket)
- 5/i – total five-wicket hauls in an innings
- 10/m – total ten-wicket hauls in a match

Fielding

- Ca – catches taken
- St – stumpings effected

== List of players ==
No.	Name	First	Last	M	Runs	HS	Avg	100	50	W	BB	Ave	5/i	10/m	C	St	Ref
1	Mohsin Kazi †	20 November 1954	27 January 1956	3	50	33	8.33	0	0	–	–	–	–	–	2	0	
2	Mohammad Ibrahim	20 November 1954	25 January 1960	2	22	21	7.33	0	0	–	–	–	–	–	2	0	
3	Ismail Gul ‡	20 November 1954	12 December 1962	7	180	35	15.00	0	0	22	6/130	23.81	1	0	1	0	
4	Abdur Rauf	20 November 1954	28 December 1954	2	45	17	11.25	0	0	0	0/6	–	0	0	2	0	
5	Taufiq Ahmed	20 November 1954	20 November 1954	1	28	28	14.00	0	0	–	–	–	–	–	1	0	
6	Syed Ahmed	20 November 1954	27 January 1956	3	27	12	5.40	0	0	2	1/37	38.50	0	0	0	0	
7	Latif-ur-Rehman	20 November 1954	20 November 1954	1	5	5	2.50	0	0	–	–	–	–	–	0	0	
8	Mohammad Sarwar ‡	20 November 1954	28 December 1954	2	5	5	1.25	0	0	2	2/29	38.50	0	0	1	0	
9	Naseer Sani	20 November 1954	20 November 1954	1	23	17	23.00	0	0	1	1/32	32.00	0	0	2	0	
10	Athar Ali	20 November 1954	28 December 1954	2	19	9*	9.50	0	0	5	3/46	19.00	0	0	1	0	
11	P. Dass	20 November 1954	20 November 1954	1	5	4	2.50	0	0	0	0/13	–	0	0	0	0	
12	Mazhar-ul-Islam	28 December 1954	27 January 1956	2	40	20	10.00	0	0	–	–	–	–	–	0	0	
13	Ilyas Ahmed	28 December 1954	28 December 1954	1	5	5	2.50	0	0	–	–	–	–	–	0	0	
14	Ikram Elahi	28 December 1954	28 December 1954	1	40	20	20.00	0	0	2	2/47	23.50	0	0	0	0	
15	Munawwar Ali Khan ‡	28 December 1954	28 December 1954	1	24	19	12.00	0	0	3	3/74	24.66	0	0	0	0	
16	Richard Dufty	28 December 1954	27 January 1956	2	16	15*	5.33	0	0	–	–	–	–	–	1	0	
17	Abdur Rasheed †	27 January 1956	27 January 1956	1	19	19	9.50	0	0	–	–	–	–	–	2	0	
18	Mahmood Hussain	27 January 1956	27 January 1956	1	14	8	7.00	0	0	1	1/7	7.00	0	0	0	0	
19	Raees Mohammad	27 January 1956	27 January 1956	1	24	20	12.00	0	0	0	0/14	–	0	0	1	0	
20	Mohammad Munaf	27 January 1956	27 January 1956	1	8	5	4.00	0	0	3	3/68	22.66	0	0	0	0	
21	A. T. M. Mustafa ‡	27 January 1956	27 January 1956	1	6	5	3.00	0	0	–	–	–	–	–	0	0	
22	Yawar Saeed	27 January 1956	27 January 1956	1	31	30*	31.00	0	0	2	2/83	41.50	0	0	2	0	
23	Abdus Salam	25 January 1960	25 January 1960	1	17	11	8.50	0	0	–	–	–	–	–	2	0	
24	Mahmood Bokul †	25 January 1960	26 March 1964	8	267	90*	19.07	0	1	–	–	–	–	–	2	0	
25	Sukumar Guha	25 January 1960	12 December 1962	7	325	73	27.08	0	3	12	4/51	28.08	0	0	2	0	
26	Abdul Latif ‡	25 January 1960	2 September 1969	15	825	143	31.73	2	3	15	3/49	39.73	0	0	10	0	
27	Moinuddin Mahmood	25 January 1960	12 December 1962	4	74	24	12.33	0	0	–	–	–	–	–	3	0	
28	N. K. Amirullah ‡	25 January 1960	27 November 1968	5	156	44*	26.00	0	0	8	2/40	39.75	0	0	0	0	
29	Mohammad Hasan	25 January 1960	28 November 1961	4	88	38	14.66	0	0	4	1/42	72.50	0	0	0	0	
30	Chand Khan	25 January 1960	25 January 1960	1	0	0	0.00	0	0	2	2/81	40.50	0	0	0	0	
31	Sohrab Khan	25 January 1960	25 January 1960	1	0	0	0.00	0	0	1	1/68	68.00	0	0	0	0	
32	Shamim Kabir †	20 November 1961	27 November 1968	8	145	37	12.08	0	0	0	0/18	–	0	0	8	0	
33	Javed Masood	20 November 1961	26 March 1964	7	608	215	46.76	2	1	–	–	–	–	–	3	0	
34	Shahabuddin Pathan †	20 November 1961	12 December 1962	6	211	45	21.10	0	0	–	–	–	–	–	1	1	
35	Tahi Rizvi	20 November 1961	20 November 1961	1	0	0	0.00	0	0	–	–	–	–	–	0	0	
36	Rafiq Kazi	20 November 1961	8 December 1962	5	41	16	6.83	0	0	6	3/41	42.50	0	0	1	0	
37	Mehdi Huda	20 November 1961	29 August 1969	5	53	21	13.25	0	0	3	1/17	70.00	0	0	1	0	
38	Altaf Hussain	20 November 1961	12 December 1962	2	23	16	11.50	0	0	0	0/41	–	0	0	1	0	
39	Alauddin	24 November 1961	28 November 1961	2	23	23	5.75	0	0	–	–	–	–	–	1	0	
40	Daulat Zaman	24 November 1961	2 September 1969	11	81	19*	10.12	0	0	21	3/30	36.52	0	0	4	0	
41	Inam-ul-Haq	4 December 1962	12 December 1962	3	23	13	7.66	0	0	8	3/46	31.62	0	0	1	0	
42	Arshad Khan	12 December 1962	12 December 1962	1	18	18	18.00	0	0	0	0/20	–	0	0	1	0	
43	Anwar Ahmed	26 March 1964	27 November 1968	5	96	35	16.00	0	0	17	5/44	28.70	1	0	3	0	
44	Saleem Ahmed	26 March 1964	26 March 1964	1	53	53	53.00	0	1	–	–	–	–	–	0	0	
45	Jamil Ahmed	26 March 1964	26 March 1964	1	11	10*	11.00	0	0	2	2/39	19.50	0	0	1	0	
46	Misbahuddin Ahmed	26 March 1964	26 March 1964	1	0	0	0.00	0	0	2	2/30	25.00	0	0	1	0	
47	Abdul Majeed	26 March 1964	26 March 1964	1	0	0*	–	0	0	–	–	–	–	–	1	0	
48	Rehman Ali †	5 October 1966	10 November 1967	2	53	19	13.25	0	0	–	–	–	–	–	3	0	
49	Halim Chowdhury	5 October 1966	2 September 1969	4	101	29	14.42	0	0	–	–	–	–	–	2	0	
50	Nasim-ul-Ghani	5 October 1966	10 November 1967	2	174	103	58.00	1	0	4	2/57	32.75	0	0	3	0	
51	Rauf Ansari	5 October 1966	27 November 1968	3	115	57*	28.75	0	1	1	1/25	146.00	0	0	2	0	
52	Mohammad Sadiq	5 October 1966	2 September 1969	7	281	77	35.12	0	2	27	5/43	18.40	2	0	4	0	
53	Naushad Ali	5 October 1966	10 November 1967	2	229	107*	114.50	1	1	–	–	–	–	–	0	0	
54	Masood-ul-Hasan	5 October 1966	10 November 1967	2	55	43*	27.50	0	0	3	3/93	49.66	0	0	1	0	
55	Mufassir-ul-Haq	5 October 1966	10 November 1967	2	5	4	1.66	0	0	3	2/20	43.66	0	0	1	0	
56	Niaz Ahmed	10 November 1967	27 November 1968	3	93	51	23.25	0	1	9	3/79	35.00	0	0	5	0	
57	Siraj Ahmed	10 November 1967	10 November 1967	1	16	9*	16.00	0	0	0	0/13	–	0	0	0	0	
58	Raqibul Hasan †	21 November 1968	2 September 1969	5	173	40	21.62	0	0	0	0/18	–	0	0	4	1	
59	Tahir Hasan	21 November 1968	27 November 1968	2	59	22	29.50	0	0	2	2/80	47.00	0	0	2	0	
60	Shafiq-ul-Haq †	21 November 1968	2 September 1969	5	183	71	26.14	0	1	0	0/12	–	0	0	5	2	
61	Iftikhar Zaidi	22 August 1969	2 September 1969	2	16	9	8.00	0	0	0	0/17	–	0	0	1	0	
62	Ashraful Haque	22 August 1969	2 September 1969	3	91	34	45.50	0	0	7	3/23	14.00	0	0	3	0	
63	Farooq Ahmed	22 August 1969	2 September 1969	3	29	13*	14.50	0	0	1	1/91	109.00	0	0	1	0	
64	Rafi Umar	22 August 1969	22 August 1969	1	0	0	0.00	0	0	0	0/42	–	0	0	0	0	
65	Inayat Hussain	29 August 1969	29 August 1969	1	8	8	8.00	0	0	0	0/18	–	0	0	1	0	
66	Haspain Isnahani	29 August 1969	2 September 1969	2	0	0	0*	–	0	10	4/30	7.30	0	0	4	0	
67	Tanvir Mahzar	2 September 1969	2 September 1969	1	–	–	–	–	–	0	0/40	–	0	0	0	0	

== List of captains ==
No.	Name	First	Last	Mat	Won	Drawn	Lost	Tied	Win%	Ref
1	Mohammad Sarwar	20 November 1954	20 November 1954	1	0	0	1	0	0.00%	
2	Munawwar Ali Khan	28 December 1954	28 December 1954	1	0	0	1	0	0.00%	
3	Abu Mustafa	27 January 1956	27 January 1956	1	0	0	1	0	0.00%	
4	Ismail Gul	25 January 1960	4 December 1962	4	1	2	1	0	25.00%	
5	Abdul Latif	20 November 1961	2 September 1969	10	5	2	3	0	50.00%	
6	N. K. Amirullah	26 March 1964	26 March 1964	1	0	1	0	0	0.00%	
