= List of Combined Services (Pakistan) cricketers =

List of cricketers

This is a list of all cricketers who have played first-class cricket for Combined Services (Pakistan) cricket team. The team played thirty-seven first-class matches between 1953 and 1979. Seasons given are first and last seasons; the player did not necessarily play in all the intervening seasons.

== Players ==
- Abdul Waheed, 1954/55
- Abdur Rehman, 1953/54-1960/61
- Aftab Ahmed, 1953/54
- Ahmed Saeed, 1955/56
- Ahmed Shamshad, 1953/54-1959/60
- Aminuddin, 1956/57
- Anis Ahmed, 1962/63-1963/64
- Anwar Saeed, 1953/54-1954/55
- Arshad, 1978/79
- Asadullah Qureshi, 1954/55-1956/57
- Baseer Shamsi, 1953/54-1960/61
- Bokhari, 1978/79
- Buland Iqbal, 1976/77-1978/79
- R. Crosse, 1962/63
- Dildar Awan, 1958/59-1964/65
- Faiz Ahmed, 1964/65
- Faiz Mohammad, 1978/79
- Farooq Ahmed, 1959/60
- Fawad Zaman, 1959/60-1960/61
- Fazal Abbas, 1977/78
- Mohammed Ghazali, 1953/54-1955/56
- Ghulam Mohiuddin, 1954/55-1956/57
- Hamid Butt, 1961/62
- Iftikhar Ahmed, 1964/65
- Imtiaz Ahmed, 1953/54-1964/65
- Imtiaz Bhatti, 1962/63
- Iqbal Awan, 1976/77-1979/80
- Iqbal Kashmiri, 1978/79-1979/80
- Irtiza Hussain, 1961/62
- Javed Ahmed, 1977/78-1978/79
- Javed Akhtar, 1962/63-1963/64
- Javed-ur-Rehman, 1976/77-1978/79
- Abdul Hafeez Kardar, 1953/54-1954/55
- Khalid Khwaja, 1953/54-1958/59
- Khalid Masood, 1955/56
- Majeed Qureshi, 1956/57
- Masood Mahmood, 1953/54
- Mazhar Siddiqi, 1953/54-1961/62
- Mazhar-ul-Haq, 1964/65
- Miran Bakhsh, 1954/55-1956/57
- Mohammad Abid, 1963/64
- Mohammad Afzal, 1962/63-1963/64
- Mohammad Iqbal, 1978/79
- Mohammad Pervez, 1963/64
- Mohammad Sabir, 1963/64
- Mohammad Shafi, 1978/79
- Mohammad Yousuf, 1963/64
- Mukhtar Cheema, 1953/54
- Munir Malik, 1962/63-1963/64
- Najam Sohail, 1976/77-1978/79
- Najibullah Niazi, 1978/79
- Naushad Ali, 1976/77-1979/80
- Nayyar Hussain, 1958/59-1977/78
- Nisar Qureshi, 1954/55
- Nuzhat Hussain, 1961/62
- M. Pengari, 1958/59-1964/65
- Qadir Jan, 1978/79
- Qamar Yousuf, 1953/54-1956/57
- Rahat Latif, 1958/59
- Rahimuddin, 1954/55-1956/57
- Saad Hatmi, 1956/57-1960/61
- Sajid, 1978/79
- Salahuddin, 1959/60-1961/62
- Salahuddin, 1977/78
- Saleem Iqbal, 1954/55-1960/61
- Saleem Sheikh, 1958/59-1961/62
- Saleem Tahir, 1954/55-1964/65
- Sarfraz Ahmed, 1964/65
- Shafaat Ahmed, 1960/61-1964/65
- Shakeeluddin, 1958/59-1961/62
- Shamim, 1976/77
- Shujauddin Butt, 1953/54-1963/64
- Sultan Khan, 1976/77-1978/79
- Syed Ali, 1958/59-1964/65
- Talat Lodhi, 1976/77
- Tanvir Hussain, 1962/63
- Taqi Shah, 1977/78-1979/80
- Tariq Mahmood, 1976/77-1979/80
- Tariq Shafi, 1962/63-1976/77
- Waqar Hasan, 1953/54
- Yousuf Siddiqi, 1960/61-1961/62
- Zafar Ahmed, 1953/54-1958/59
- Zafar Mahmood, 1976/77-1979/80
- Zakauddin, 1956/57
- Ziauddin Burney, 1962/63-1963/64
