= 1956–57 Quaid-e-Azam Trophy =

- Dates: 25 December 1956 – 8 March 1957
- Administrator: Board of Control for Cricket in Pakistan
- Cricket format: First-class
- Tournament format(s): round-robin, semi-finals and final
- Champions: Punjab (1st title)
- Participants: 13
- Matches: 18
- Most runs: Hanif Mohammad (356)
- Most wickets: Fazal Mahmood (35)

The 1956–57 Quaid-e-Azam Trophy was the third edition of the Quaid-e-Azam Trophy, the domestic first-class cricket competition in Pakistan.

In a change from the first two editions, the 1956–57 competition was contested in four round-robin groups, with the top teams in each playing semi-finals and a final to determine the winner. Matches were played from 25 December 1956 to 8 March 1957, with the group stage matches played over three days, the semi-finals over five days, and the final over six days.

In the final, Punjab defeated the Karachi Whites by 43 runs, claiming their first title. Hanif Mohammad was the leading run-scorer in the competition, and Fazal Mahmood was the leading wicket-taker.

== Group stage ==
The winner of each zone, marked in bold, qualified for the semi-finals.

Central Zone
Team	Pld	W	L	ND	Pts
**Karachi Blues**	2	2	0	0	**6**
Railways	2	1	1	0	**3**
Punjab A	2	0	2	0	**0**

North Zone
Team	Pld	W	L	ND	Pts
**Punjab**	3	3	0	0	**9**
Bahawalpur	3	1	1	1	**4**
Punjab B	3	1	1	1	**4**
Peshawar	3	0	3	0	**0**

East Zone
Team	Pld	W	L	ND	Pts
**Combined Services**	2	2	0	0	**6**
East Pakistan Greens	2	1	1	0	**3**
East Pakistan Whites	2	0	2	0	**0**

South Zone
Team	Pld	W	L	ND	Pts
**Karachi Whites**	2	2	0	0	**6**
Karachi Greens	2	1	1	0	**3**
Sindh	2	0	2	0	**0**

Position determined by total points; matches finishing in a draw or a tie were decided on first innings scores, with points awarded as follows:
- Win, or draw having led on first innings = 3 points
- Draw with no decision on first innings = 1 point
- Loss, or draw having trailed on first innings = 0 points

== Finals ==
=== Semi-finals ===
1–6 February 1957
Scorecard

Karachi Blues	v	Karachi Whites
314 (88.2 overs); Maqsood Ahmed 90; Mahmood Hussain 5/117		762 (313.2 overs); Hanif Mohammad 228; Nasim-ul-Ghani 3/184
316 (100 overs); Raees Mohammad 84; Aslam Khan 3/80

Karachi Whites won by an innings and 132 runs
Gymkhana Ground, Karachi
Umpires: Daud Khan and Qamaruddin Butt

- Karachi Blues won the toss and elected to bat.

7–12 February 1957
Scorecard

Combined Services	v	Punjab
112 (81.3 overs); Shujauddin Butt 56; Fazal Mahmood 6/33		253 (108.5 overs); Fazal Mahmood 91; Baseer Shamsi 6/73
99 (60.1 overs); Shujauddin Butt 40; Fazal Mahmood 9/43

Punjab won by an innings and 42 runs
University of the Punjab, Lahore
Umpires: Kaleem Ahmed and Shujauddin Siddiqi

- Combined Services won the toss and elected to bat.

=== Final ===
8–14 March 1957
Scorecard

Punjab	v	Karachi Whites
418 (123.5 overs); Ijaz Butt 147; Khan Mohammad 3/111		289 (119.4 overs); Alimuddin 105; Yawar Saeed 5/89
182 (78.5 overs); Agha Saadat Ali 56; Mohammad Munaf 6/67		268 (128.1 overs); Waqar Hasan 51; Ehsan Elahi 4/62

Punjab won by 43 runs
University of the Punjab, Lahore
Umpires: Karim Akbar and Amjad Qureshi

- Punjab won the toss and elected to bat.

== Statistics ==
=== Most runs ===
The top five run-scorers are included in this table, listed by runs scored and then by batting average.

Player	Team	Runs	Inns	Avg	Highest	100s	50s
Hanif Mohammad	Karachi Whites	356	4	89.00	228	1	1
Alimuddin	Karachi Whites	302	5	75.50	105	1	1
Gul Mohammad	Punjab	257	7	36.71	175	1	0
Fazal Mahmood	Punjab	252	5	50.40	91	0	2
Ijaz Butt	Punjab	225	4	56.25	147	1	0

=== Most wickets ===
The top five wicket-takers are listed in this table, listed by wickets taken and then by bowling average.

Player	Team	Overs	Wkts	Ave	5	10	BBI
Fazal Mahmood	Punjab	151.2	35	5.14	4	1	9/43
Khalid Qureshi	Punjab	238.2	28	12.78	3	1	6/18
Mahmood Hussain	Karachi Whites	195.5	28	19.39	3	1	8/95
Haseeb Ahsan	Peshawar	89.5	19	12.68	2	1	8/76
Mohammad Munaf	Karachi Whites	133.4	18	19.66	1	0	6/67
