= List of Pakistan Air Force cricketers =

This is a list of cricketers who played for the Pakistan Air Force cricket team in first-class cricket matches. The team played a total of eight first-class matches between 1969 and 1975. (Note: Pakistan Air Force were scheduled to play three matches in the 1986/87 BCCP Presidents Cup but, following the withdrawal of some teams from the competition, all of their matches were abandoned or cancelled.) The team continues to play non-first-class cricket today. Only those players who played in first-class matches for the team are included below.

== A ==
Name	Seasons (Note: The range of seasons the player played for Pakistan Air Force in first-class cricket.)	Matches	Comments	Ref
Abbas Mirza	1970/71–1975/76	2	Right-handed batsman who scored 32 runs and took 1 wicket in his two matches for the team. Is not known to have played any other cricket. Other than his name no biographical details are known.	
Akhtar Ali	1970/71–1975/76	3	Scored 99 runs and took five wickets for the team in three matches. Is not known to have played any other cricket. Other than his name no biographical details are known.	

== D ==
Name	Seasons	Matches	Comments	Ref
Dildar Awan	1969/70–1972/73	7	An experienced player who played in seven of the teams eight matches. Had played 17 times for Combined Services between 1958/59 and 1964/65 and made a total of 31 first-class appearances for a variety of teams.	

== F ==
Name	Seasons	Matches	Comments	Ref
Faiz Ahmed	1969/70–1972/73	7	Played in seven of the team's eight matches, having played twice for Combined Services in 1964/65 and once for Peshawar in 1967/68. A right-handed batsman who occasionally played as a wicket-keeper and scored 188 runs for the team with a highest score of 48 runs. Other than his name no biographical details are known.	

== G ==
Name	Seasons	Matches	Comments	Ref
Ghias Cheema	1970/71–1972/73	4	Slow left-arm orthodox bowler who took six of his 12 first-class wickets for the team. Had played six first-class matches for Sargodha in 1967/68–1968/69. Other than his name no biographical details are known.	

== H ==
Name	Seasons	Matches	Comments	Ref
Hasnain Mehdi	1969/70–1975/76	5	Right-arm bowler who took four wickets for the team in his five first-class matches as well as scoring 106 runs. Is not known to have played any other cricket. Other than his name no biographical details are known.	

== I ==
Name	Seasons	Matches	Comments	Ref
Ijaz Saeed	1975/76	1	Played his only known cricket match for the team in 1975/76, scoring seven runs. Other than his name no biographical details are known.	
Imtiaz Ahmed	1969/70–1972/73	5	By far the most experienced player to appear for the team, Imtiaz had played 41 Test matches for Pakistan between 1952 and 1962. A wicket-keeper who played in 180 first-class matches, the last of which were for the team whom he played for in his 40s.	

== J ==
Name	Seasons	Matches	Comments	Ref
Jamshed Akbar	1969/70	2	Scored 12 runs and took no wickets in his two matches for the team. Is not known to have played any other cricket matches. Other than his name no biographical details are known.	
Javed Kausar	1970/71	2	Wicket-keeper who scored 22 runs for the team. Is not known to have played any other cricket matches. Other than his name no biographical details are known.	

== K ==
Name	Seasons	Matches	Comments	Ref
Khalid Haroon	1969/70–1970/71	5	Scored 25 runs and took two wickets in his five matches for the team. Is not known to have played any other cricket matches. Other than his name no biographical details are known.	
Khalid Idrees	1972/73	1	Right-handed batsman who scored no runs in his only innings for the team. Khalid played seven first-class matches for Peshawar, one for Railways B and one first-class and one List A match for North-West Frontier Province. Other than his name no biographical details are known.	
Khalid Qureshi	1969/70–1970/71	4	Scored 16 runs and took four wickets with a best bowling return of 3/41 in his four matches for the team. Is not known to have played any other cricket matches. Other than his name no biographical details are known.	

== M ==
Name	Seasons	Matches	Comments	Ref
Mansoob Ahmed	1970/71–1972/73	3	Scored 63 runs and took three wickets in his three matches for the team. Is not known to have played any other cricket matches. Other than his name no biographical details are known.	
Mohammad Afzal	1970/71	2	Played twice for the team, scoring 35 runs including his highest first-class score of 21. A right-handed batsman, he also played twice for Sargodha. Other than his name no biographical details are known.	
Mohammad Ansari	1975/76	1	Playing in his only known cricket match, Mohammad Ansari scored 10 runs, making 5 in both innings in which he batted. Other than his name no biographical details are known.	
Mohammad Brohi	1969/70–1970/71	5	Right-handed batsman who played as a wicket-keeper in one match. Scored a total of 68 runs and took nine catches in his five matches for the team. Is not known to have played any other cricket matches. Other than his name no biographical details are known.	
Mohammad Hanif	1975/76	1	Wicket-keeper who scored five runs in his only match for the team. Is not known to have played any other cricket matches. Other than his name no biographical details are known.	
Mohammad Naeem	1972/73	1	Bowler who took a single wicket and scored no runs in his only known cricket match. Other than his name no biographical details are known.	
Mohammad Nisar Ahmed	1969/70–1975/76	6	Played six of his 24 first-class matches for the team, taking nine wickets and scoring 177 runs. Played 17 first-class matches for Peshawar between 1958/59 and 1976/77 and in one first-class and three List A matches for North-West Frontier Province. Born in 1940 at Peshawar.	
Mohammad Zahid	1969/70	2	Scored 13 runs and took four wickets in two matches for the team. Is not known to have played any other cricket matches. Other than his name no biographical details are known.	

== N ==
Name	Seasons	Matches	Comments	Ref
Nuzhat Hussain	1970/71	2	Scored 60 runs in his two matches for the team. Played in a total of eight first-class matches, once for Combined Services in 1960/61 and five matches for Punjab B in the late 1950s. Is not known to have played any other cricket matches. Two brothers, Nayyar Hussain and Sabahat Hussain both played first-class cricket.	

== S ==
Name	Seasons	Matches	Comments	Ref
Saad Hatmi	1969/70	3	Scored 70 runs and took three wickets in his three matches for the team, having previously played for Combined Services in eight matches in the late 1950s. Other than his name no biographical details are known.	
Shahid Qureshi	1970/71–1972/73	4	Played in four matches for the team, scoring 175 runs, with a highest score of 60 runs, and taking three wickets with best bowling figures of 3/14. Is not known to have played any other cricket matches. Other than his name no biographical details are known.	

== T ==
Name	Seasons	Matches	Comments	Ref
Talat Ahmed	1975/76	1	Scored a single run in his only known cricket match. Other than his name no biographical details are known.	
Tariq Cheema	1975/76	1	An experienced cricketer who played in 30 first-class matches, having made his debut in 1964/65. Scored 14 runs and took three wickets in his only match for the team.	
Taufiq Ahmed	1975/76	1	Is known to have played in just one cricket match, scoring 26 runs, with a highest score of 15, in the two innings in which he batted. Other than his name no biographical details are known.	

== Z ==
Name	Seasons	Matches	Comments	Ref
Zahid Rasheed	1969/70–1972/73	5	Played in five matches for the team, scoring 153 runs with a highest score of 79, and taking three wickets. Played a single first-class match for Water and Power Development Authority and one List A match for Railways, both in 1975/76. His brother, Shahid Rasheed, played a single match for Water and Power Development Authority.	
Zakir Hussain	1972/73	1	Scored 23 runs with a highest score of 18 in his only known cricket match. Other than his name no biographical details are known.	
Ziauddin	1975/76	1	Scored four runs and did not take a wicket in his only known cricket match. Other than his name no biographical details are known.	
