= Masood Akhtar (cricketer) =

British India-born American cricketer

Personal information
- Full name: Syed Masood Akhtar
- Born: 18 August 1946 (age 80); Delhi, British India
- Batting: Right-handed
- Bowling: Right-arm off-spin

International information
- National side: United States (1979–1982)

Domestic team information
- Years: Team
- 1962: Pakistan Education Board
- 1962: Karachi B
- 1964–1968: Karachi
- 1965–1966: Karachi Blues
- 1966–1968: Karachi Whites
- 1968: Central Zone
- 1968: Pakistan Universities
- 1968–1970: Public Works Department
- 1971–1972: Pakistan International Airlines B
- Source: CricketArchive, 11 March 2016

Syed Masood Akhtar (born 18 August 1946) is a former international cricketer who represented the United States national team between 1979 and 1982. He was born in present-day India, and played first-class cricket in Pakistan before emigrating to the United States.

Akhtar was born in Delhi, but moved to Pakistan after the partition of India. He made his first-class debut in March 1962, aged 15, playing for the Pakistan Education Board in the Ayub Trophy. His Quaid-i-Azam Trophy came in December of the same year, when he played a single match for Karachi B. Playing for Karachi during the 1964–65 season, Akhtar made a maiden first-class century, scoring 112 runs against Karachi University in the Ayub Trophy. In the tournament's final, against the Lahore Education Board, he scored another century, 116 runs, from eighth in the batting order. One of his opponents in that game was Kamran Rasheed, who was later his teammate on the U.S. national team. Later in the 1964–65 season, in the Quaid-i-Azam Trophy, Akhtar added a third century, scoring 113 for the Karachi Blues against Bahawalpur.

In March 1968, Akhtar appeared twice against the Commonwealth XI team that was touring Pakistan at the time – once for Central Zone and once for Pakistan Universities. Over the next few seasons, he also made appearances for the Public Works Department and Pakistan International Airlines B, with his last first-class appearance coming in March 1972.

After moving to the U.S., Akhtar made his debut for the national team at the 1979 ICC Trophy in England. He played only a single match at the tournament, however, scoring five runs and taking 1/33 against Wales. Akhtar was also included in the American squad for the 1982 ICC Trophy, but again played only a single game, against Gibraltar. He conceded two runs from his only over, with the match being washed out after 18 overs of play.

Akhtar remained involved in American cricket after his retirement from playing, serving as a physiotherapist for the national team and on the board of the United States of America Cricket Association (USACA), including briefly as president. He was inducted into the U.S. Cricket Hall of Fame in 2010.
