= 1954–55 Quaid-e-Azam Trophy =

- Dates: 29 October 1954 – 24 April 1955
- Administrator: Board of Control for Cricket in Pakistan
- Cricket format: First-class (three-day)
- Tournament format: Knockout
- Champions: Karachi (1st title)
- Participants: 9
- Matches: 8

The 1954–55 Quaid-e-Azam Trophy was a first-class cricket competition that was held in Pakistan from 29 October 1954 to 24 April 1955. It was the second edition of the Quaid-e-Azam Trophy.

The competition was contested as a knockout tournament by nine teams, an increase of two from the first season, representing both regions and government departments; East Pakistan cricket team and Baluchistan made their first appearances in the Quaid-e-Azam Trophy. 1953–54 winner Bahawalpur received a bye through to the semi-finals.

The final, played in Karachi, was contested between Karachi and Combined Services. Karachi won by nine wickets, easily scoring the 33 runs they needed for victory after forcing Combined Services to follow-on in their second innings.

== Teams ==
Team	Captain(s)
Bahawalpur	Israr Ali
Baluchistan	Athar Khan
Combined Services	Abdul Kardar
East Pakistan	Mohammad Sarwar
Karachi	Anwar Hussain
North-West Frontier Province	Sher Khan
Punjab	Fazal Mahmood
Railways	Masood Salahuddin
Sind	Anwar Shaikh

== Results ==
Round 1
12–14 November 1954; Karachi Parsi Institute Ground, Karachi
Karachi	452
Railways	183 & 253
29–31 October 1954; Racecourse Ground, Quetta
Baluchistan	223 & 126
Sind	295 & 107

Round 2
19–21 November 1954; Karachi Parsi Institute Ground, Karachi
Karachi	452/3d
Sind	134 & 244/6 (f/o)
19–21 November 1954; Peshawar Club Ground, Peshawar
NW Frontier Province	102 & 145
Punjab	249 & 192/5d
20–22 November 1954; Club Ground, Dacca
East Pakistan	116 & 111
Combined Services	210/8d & 148/3d

Semi-finals
15–17 April 1955; Bahawal Stadium, Bahawalpur
Bahawalpur	173 & 107 (f/o)
Karachi	351
15–17 April 1955; Punjab University Ground, Lahore
Punjab	147 & 159/2
Combined Services	355 & 177/7d

Final
21–24 April 1955; National Stadium, Karachi
Karachi	438 & 35/1
Combined Services	221 & 249 (f/o)

== Final ==
21–24 April 1955
Scorecard

Karachi	v	Combined Services
438 all out (173.3 overs); Wazir Mohammad 118; Saleem Iqbal 2/65 (15 overs)		221 all out (68.5 overs); Imtiaz Ahmed 81; Mahmood Hussain 5/75 (28 overs)
35/1 (7 overs); Ikram Qureshi 16*; Baseer Shamsi 1/17 (4 overs)		249 (81.3 overs) (f/o); Ebbu Ghazali 55; Abdul Wahab 4/31 (12.3 overs)

Karachi won by 9 wickets
National Stadium, Karachi
Umpires: Daud Khan & Idrees Baig

- Karachi won the toss and elected to bat.
