= Taufiq Ahmed =

Taufiq Ahmed may refer to:

- a Pakistan Air Force cricketer in 1975/76
- an East Pakistan first-class cricketer in 1954
