= Haleem Chaudhri =

Bengali cricketer and Bir Bikrom recipient

Abdul Halim Chowdhury Jewel, mostly known as Shaheed Jewel, was a Bengali cricketer and a recipient of Bir Bikrom, Bangladesh's third highest gallantry award for his actions during the Liberation War of Bangladesh. He played first-class cricket regularly for different teams from East Pakistan during the latter half of the 1960s. In March 1971, East Pakistan declared independence (and took the new name Bangladesh). As an active member of the legendary Crack Platoon, he participated in the Liberation War of Bangladesh. On August 25, 1971, Pakistani Army detained and brutally killed him later. Since then he has enjoyed a folk-hero status in the annals of Bangladesh cricket history. He was a role model for the first generation of Bangladeshi cricketers.

== First-class career ==
He made his first-class debut in May 1966, playing for Dacca against Public Works Department. He scored 38 & 4 in the match. Overall, in 7 first-class matches, he scored 259 runs at an average of 21.58, His best performance in first-class cricket came in January 1971. Playing for East Pakistan Whites against Dacca University, he scored 47 & 65 in the match.

== Opening partnerships ==
Shamim Kabir was his opening partner in his debut match. The pair, however, failed in this match. In August 1969, he shared a 53-run opening partnership with WK Shafiq-ul-Haq against a strong Karachi Whites bowling attack. Just a week after that, he shared a 50-run stand with Raqibul Hasan. Young Raqibul was in uncharacteristic aggressive mood and dominated the partnership with 40. In January 1971, he and his opening partner Rauf Ansari, completely dominated the Dacca University bowling, putting on 94 in the 1st innings and 123 in the 2nd.
