= List of Pakistan Security Printing Corporation cricketers =

This is a list of all cricketers who have played first-class or other local matches for Pakistan Security Printing Corporation cricket team. The team played matches in the Patron's Trophy between 1977 and 1979. Seasons given are first and last seasons; the player did not necessarily play in all the intervening seasons.

== Notable players ==
- Aftab Ansari, 1978/79–1979/80
- Akhtar Ali, 1978/79–1979/80
- Akram Khan, 1979/80
- Aslam Khan, 1977/78
- Athar Kazmi, 1977/78
- Athar Khan, 1977/78
- Azam Khan, 1977/78
- Farooq Ahmed, 1979/80
- Farrukh Tirmizi, 1977/78
- Haaris Siddiqi, 1978/79
- Haider Ali, 1977/78
- Humayun, 1978/79
- Izhar ul Haq, 1978/79
- Jamil Zaidi, 1978/79
- Khalid Abbasi, 1979/80
- Khalid Ghauri, 1978/79
- Khalid Mahmood, 1978/79
- Liaqatullah, 1977/78
- Mohammad Obaid, 1977/78–1979/80
- Nasir Bashir, 1978/79–1979/80
- Nazir Ahmed, 1977/78
- Parvez Akbar, 1977/78–1978/79
- Rafat Alam, 1977/78
- Rafiq Godil, 1979/80
