= Saleem Tahir =

Pakistani cricketer

Personal information
- Full name: Saleem Tahir (born Herbert Stanley)
- Born: unknown
- Batting: Right-handed
- Bowling: Slow left-arm orthodox
- Role: Batsman

Domestic team information
- Years: Team
- 1954–1964: Combined Services

Career statistics
Competition	FC
Matches	17
Runs scored	535
Batting average	19.81
100s/50s	1/2
Top score	122
Balls bowled	558
Wickets	5
Bowling average	53.00
5 wickets in innings	0
10 wickets in match	0
Best bowling	3/73
Catches/stumpings	6/-
- Source: CricketArchive, 25 June 2013

Saleem Tahir (date of birth unknown), known as Herbert Stanley throughout most of his playing career, was a Pakistani cricketer who appeared regularly for Combined Services during the 1950s and 1960s.

Stanley first played for Combined Services during the 1954–55 season of the Quaid-e-Azam Trophy, and scored a half-century on debut, an innings of 55 runs against East Pakistan. A competent right-handed batsman, he went on to play 17 matches at first-class level (including 16 for Services), the majority of which came in the Quaid-e-Azam Trophy. Stanley scored only one century during his career, an innings of 122 runs scored against Peshawar in December 1958, which included a 178-run partnership with Imtiaz Ahmed for the fourth wicket. As a left-arm orthodox spinner, he also bowled on occasion, particularly towards the end of his career. His best figures, 3/73, were taken against the Lahore Education Board in December 1964, in what was to be his last match at first-class level.

Stanley changed his name some time between his fifteenth and sixteenth appearances, in November 1961 and December 1964, respectively, though it is unclear exactly when and in what circumstances the name change took place.
