= Masood-ul-Hasan =

Personal information
- Born: 22 December 1945 (age 80); Bharatpur, British India
- Batting: Right-handed
- Bowling: Right-arm off-break

Domestic team information
- Years: Team
- 1961/62 to 1968/69: Karachi
- 1966/67 to 1967/68: East Pakistan
- 1967/68: Public Works Department
- 1967/68 to 1977/78: Pakistan International Airlines

Career statistics
Competition	First-class
Matches	64
Runs scored	1840
Batting average	27.87
100s/50s	0/12
Top score	97
Balls bowled	5452
Wickets	99
Bowling average	25.78
5 wickets in innings	5
10 wickets in match	1
Best bowling	6/40
Catches/stumpings	40/–
- Source: Cricinfo, 26 February 2018

Masood-ul-Hasan (born 22 December 1945) is a former cricketer who played first-class cricket for several teams in Pakistan between 1961/62 and 1977/78. He toured Australia and New Zealand with the national side in 1964/65 but did not play Test cricket.

== Cricket career ==
An off-spin bowler and useful lower-order batsman, Masood-ul-Hasan made his first-class debut at the age of 15, taking 6 for 60 in the first innings for Karachi Greens against Karachi Whites in a Quaid-e-Azam Trophy match in November 1961. He was selected to play for Pakistan against a Commonwealth XI team in 1963-64, and visited Ceylon with a Pakistan A team in 1964/65, but with little success either time.

He toured Australia and New Zealand in 1964/65 with the Pakistan Test team but played in only five of the 14 first-class matches and none of the Tests. He bowled only 238 balls on the three-month tour, taking two wickets.

He hit his highest score of 97 in the final of the Quadrangular Tournament in 1968/69, helping Pakistan International Airlines win the first of their many championships. His best innings bowling figures were 6 for 40 for Pakistan International Airlines A against Rawalpindi in 1971/72, and his best match figures were 11 for 99 (5 for 56 and 6 for 43) for Pakistan International Airlines B against Railways in 1969-70.
