= Umar Khan (umpire) =

Pakistani cricketer (1919–1990)

Personal information
- Born: 1919
- Died: 4 August 1990 (aged 70–71); Karachi, Pakistan

Umpiring information
- Tests umpired: 1 (1969)
- Source: Cricinfo, 16 July 2013

Umar Khan (1919 – 4 August 1990) was a Pakistani cricketer and umpire. He played in twenty-one first-class matches between 1935 and 1946. He also stood in one Test match, between Pakistan and New Zealand, in 1969. He was also a coach of Abdul Dyer.

== See also ==
- List of Test cricket umpires
