= Pritish =

Pritish is a masculine given name. Notable people with this name include:

- Pritish Chakraborty (born 1984), Indian actor
- Pritish Dass (fl. 1954), East Pakistani first-class cricketer
- Pritish Nandy (1951–2025), Indian poet and politician
