= Central Zone =

Central Zone may refer to:

== Places ==
- Central Indo-Aryan languages, or the "Central Zone" of Indo-Aryan, a language group of India
- Central Zone, Bhutan, an administrative district of Bhutan
- Central Zone of São Paulo, an administrative zone of the city of São Paulo, Brazil
- Central Zone of the Town of Angra do Heroismo in the Azores, a UNESCO World Heritage Site
- Central Zone, Tigray, Ethiopia

== Sports ==
- Central Zone cricket team, central India
- Central Zone cricket team (Bangladesh)
- Central Zone cricket team (Pakistan)
- Central Zone women's cricket team, central India

== See also ==
- Central Railway zone, a zone of Indian Railways, headquartered in Mumbai
- Central Time Zone
