= Aslam Khan (cricketer) =

Pakistani cricketer

Personal information
- Full name: Mohammad Aslam Khan
- Born: 15 March 1935; Manavadar, Princely state of Junagadh, British India
- Died: 29 April 1980 (aged 45); Karachi, Sindh, Pakistan
- Batting: Left-handed
- Bowling: Slow left-arm orthodox
- Relatives: Ghulam Moinuddin Khanji (father)

Domestic team information
- Years: Team
- 1955/56–1970/71: Karachi
- 1977/78: Pakistan Security Printing Corporation

Career statistics
Competition	First-class
Matches	28
Runs scored	398
Batting average	19.90
100s/50s	1/0
Top score	112*
Balls bowled	5,170
Wickets	84
Bowling average	22.63
5 wickets in innings	5
10 wickets in match	1
Best bowling	6/45
Catches/stumpings	27/–
- Source: ESPNcricinfo, 29 August 2015

Aslam Khan (Urdu: اسلم خان), sometimes known as Prince Aslam Khan (Urdu: شہزادہ اسلم خان, romanized as: Shehzada Aslam Khaan; 15 March 1935 – 29 April 1980) was a Pakistani cricketer who played first-class cricket between 1955 and 1978. Some people consider him the inventor of the doosra delivery, long before Saqlain Mushtaq's use of the delivery made it well known across the cricketing world.

A son of Ghulam Moinuddin Khanji, he was a member of the royal family of Manavadar, a princely state which is now part of the Indian state of Gujarat.

Aslam Khan was a left-arm spinner. In the final of the Ayub Trophy in 1964-65 he took 6 for 45 and 5 for 92 (match figures of 81.5–43–137–11) to help Karachi to an innings victory over Lahore Education Board. In a semi-final of the Ayub Trophy in 1965–66, playing for Karachi Blues against Public Works Department, he took 3 for 35 and 5 for 41 in another victory.

Khan played his last first-class match in February 1978 for the Pakistan Security Printing Corporation team in the Patron's Trophy. A month short of his 43rd birthday, he took 6 for 154 off 47 eight-ball overs against Sargodha, who won by an innings and 143 runs.

He batted at number 10 or 11 and only once reached 40 in first-class cricket. On that occasion he scored 112 not out as Karachi Whites scored 762 and beat Karachi Blues by an innings in a semi-final of the Quaid-e-Azam Trophy in 1956–57. He also took three catches and three wickets in the match.

Khan was a flamboyant character, "playing practical jokes, dating a series of movie stars, driving to matches (often late) in a Cadillac, firing revolver shots in the air in protest at an umpire's decision". Mushtaq Mohammad credited him with the invention of the doosra.

His father, the last Nawab of Manavadar, also played first-class cricket and represented India at hockey.
