= Rashid Israr =

Indian-born Pakistani cricketer (born 1953)

Personal information
- Born: 1 July 1953 (age 73); Sitapur, Uttar Pradesh, India
- Batting: Right-handed
- Bowling: Right-arm medium
- Role: Occasional Wicket-keeper

Domestic team information
- Years: Team
- 1971/72: Pakistan International Airlines B
- 1972/73–1974/75: Public Works Department
- 1973/74–1975/76: Sind, incl. Sind A and Sind B
- 1973/74: Pakistan Universities
- 1974/75: Karachi Whites
- 1975/76–1977/78: Habib Bank Limited
- 1978/79–1986/87: Pakistan International Airlines

Career statistics
| Competition | First-class | List A |
|---|---|---|
| Matches | 91 | 21 |
| Runs scored | 4,905 | 152 |
| Batting average | 39.87 | 15.20 |
| 100s/50s | 11/20 | 0/0 |
| Top score | 350 | 29 |
| Balls bowled | 84 | 252 |
| Wickets | 1 | 6 |
| Bowling average | 48.00 | 29.50 |
| 5 wickets in innings | 0 | 0 |
| 10 wickets in match | 0 | 0 |
| Best bowling | 1/9 | 2/28 |
| Catches/stumpings | 81/8 | 13/1 |
- Source: CricketArchive, 23 February 2025

Rashid Israr (born 1 July 1953) is an Indian-born Pakistani retired cricketer. He played for 16 seasons in domestic cricket, between 1971 and 1987, as a specialist batter who often kept wicket. Israr scored eleven centuries during his career and has one of the highest scores recorded in a first-class match in Pakistan.

== Early career ==
Born in Sitapur in the Indian state of Uttar Pradesh, on 1 July 1953, Israr was the younger brother of Shahid Israr, who played a single Test match for Pakistan in 1976. Israr made his debut in Pakistani cricket during the 1971/72 BCCP Trophy as part of a B squad for the Pakistan International Airlines (PIA) departmental team. In the match, he scored 34 and 19 in his two innings of batting. He moved on to the Public Works Department (PWD) side for the 1972/73 event, which was renamed the BCCP Patron's Trophy by this time, and, in three matches, scored three half-centuries in four innings at the crease.

During the mid-1970s, Israr represented multiple teams simultaneously, often depending on the competition he was playing in. While representing PWD again in the 1973/74 Patron's Trophy, he also represented Sind (Note: Sind was the English spelling for what is now the Sindh province at the time Rashid played for them.) in the newly-formed Pentangular Trophy; in the former, he made his first career century, taking around nine and a half hours to score an unbeaten 211 against Hyderabad. Overall, he finished the year with a batting average of 61.71 in five total matches. The following season, he represented three different teams in four different competitions: PWD in the Patron's Trophy, Sind in the Pentangular Trophy and the Quaid-e-Azam Trophy, (Note: In the Quaid-e-Azam Trophy, Rashid's team was known as Sind A, as a Sind B side also appeared in the event.) and a Karachi Whites team in the final of the Kardar Summer Shield, a short-lived event where only the final was considered a first-class match. Between all four competitions, he scored 663 runs in 11 matches at an average of 39.00.

== Middle career ==
Israr appeared in eight different competitions in Pakistan during the 1975/76 season, five with first-class status and three with List A status, (Note: Among first-class competitions, Rashid appeared in the Sikandar Ali Bhutto Cup, Patron's Trophy, and Abdul Sattar Pirzada Memorial Trophy with HBL, the Pentangular Trophy with Sind, and the Quaid-e-Azam Trophy with Sind's B side. In all three List A competitions on offer that year, the Servis Cup, Habib Bank Gold Cup, and United Bank Trophy, Rashid appeared with HBL.) which he split between two teams representing Sind and the Habib Bank Limited cricket team (HBL). His overall numbers in first-class matches fell to 417 runs in a season, with his batting average falling nearly seven points to 32.07. In seven List A matches, he only managed a high of 29 runs in an innings, with 67 runs total.

In the 1976/77 campaign, Israr spent the full domestic season with HBL. He would set a personal best that year with 911 runs in 10 matches, a total that ranked third among all domestic cricketers in Pakistan behind Javed Miandad and Mohsin Khan; both were teammates of Israr's at HBL at times during the year. In helping the team win the Patron's Trophy against the National Bank of Pakistan cricket team, he scored 350 in an innings during the final. He stayed at the crease for roughly twelve and a half hours of match time to score his total before being dismissed. At the time, Israr's 350 was the third-highest score in Pakistan's domestic cricket history, behind only the then-world record of 499 by Hanif Mohammad in 1959 (Note: Hanif's 499 was later passed by Brian Lara in his unbeaten 501 in 1994.) and a score of 428 by Aftab Baloch in 1974. (Note: As of 2025, it is the fourth highest score on Pakistani soil; Naved Latif would later score 394 in a 2000 match.) Coincidentally, Aftab was responsible for dismissing Israr by stumping him to end his innings. Israr's 1977/78 season was his final one with HBL. While appearing in two more matches than the previous campaign, he managed over 300 fewer runs, though his batting average remained above his career numbers.

== Late career ==
For the 1978/79 season, Israr rejoined PIA's cricket team. In his first Quaid-e-Azam match for the side, he scored his third and final double-century against Punjab, en route to a 648-run season that saw him record his highest batting average, 72.00, over a full season. The season also included his final century, an unbeaten 174, during a Patron's Trophy match against Multan that was conceded to PIA before the innings could finish.

His runs and appearances would decline sharply over the rest of his tenure with PIA, starting with a 1979/80 season that was limited to four matches and featured his lowest season batting average at the time. Seven matches and over 350 runs followed the next year, though an improved 35.80 average was still below average for his career. From 1981 to 1985, he would fail to reach 200 runs in a season. Despite this, he appeared in his only match outside of Pakistan during 1981/82, when PIA toured Zimbabwe to play first-class and List A matches against their cricket team; his lone first-class match saw him total eight runs, two more than he would score in his two one-day matches combined.

After not appearing in a match during the 1985/86 year, he reappeared for PIA at the end of the following season in 1987, when he was chosen for their PACO Cup (Note: The PACO Cup was the sponsored name of the Patron's Trophy when the Pakistan Automobile Corporation had naming rights for it in the 1980s.) final match against United Bank Limited. In the match, ultimately a win for PIA, he managed 20 runs in the two innings combined. Overall, his career ended with 4,905 first-class runs, in addition to 152 in List A matches.
