= Altaf Hussain (East Pakistan cricketer) =

East Pakistani cricketer (1943–2019)

Altaf Hussain (1943 – 27 February 2019) was a Bangladeshi cricketer who played first-class cricket in the 1960s. Overall, he played six first-class matches for different teams of East Pakistan.

A right-arm fast bowler, he made his first-class debut for the East Pakistan team against a strong Karachi Green side in Karachi the Quaid-e-Azam Trophy. He failed to pick up any wickets in his debut match. And although he went wicketless in his next first-class match as well, at the famous national stadium, Karachi, he enjoyed a fine match, playing for Dacca, against Dacca University, at the outer stadium, in March 1965. In this match, his 2/20 and 3/9 contributed greatly to a big win for the Dacca team.

Overall, in 6 first-class matches, he took 6 wickets at 36 apiece.

After retirement he became heavily involved with cricket coaching. His contribution to the game was recognized by BSJA, which gave him a special category award in 2012.
