= Pakistan Air Force cricket team =

Cricket team

The Pakistan Air Force (PAF) cricket team competed at first-class level in cricket competitions in Pakistan from 1969 to 1975.

== Playing record ==
Pakistan Air Force competed in the Quaid-i-Azam Trophy in 1969-70 and 1970–71, and the Patron's Trophy in 1970–71, 1972–73 and 1975–76. Of their eight first-class matches they won one, lost six, and drew one.

Their batting was weak: they were dismissed four times for less than 100, and their only total above 150 was 196 in their drawn match against Lahore B in 1972–73. Their highest individual score was 79, by Zahid Rasheed, against Rawalpindi in 1969–70. Their best bowling figures were 6 for 52 (match figures of 8 for 94) by Dildar Awan against Peshawar in 1969–70. Awan also took 4 for 35 and 2 for 23 in Pakistan Air Force's 3-run victory over Sargodha in 1970–71.

They played one match on their home ground, the General Headquarters Ground, Rawalpindi, in 1969–70.

Pakistan Air Force teams have continued to play in various national competitions at sub-first-class level.

== Notable players ==
Pakistan Air Force were captained in five matches by the former Test player Imtiaz Ahmed, whose first-class career had begun in 1944. He and Dildar Awan had been prominent members of the Combined Services cricket team, which did not play first-class cricket between 1964 and 1977. Both men were in their forties when they played for Pakistan Air Force.
