= Munawwar Ali Khan =

Pakistani cricketer (1924–2013)

Personal information
- Born: 24 December 1924; Lahore, British India
- Died: 21 October 2013 (aged 88)
- Batting: Right-handed
- Bowling: Right-arm fast
- Role: Bowler

Career statistics
Competition	First-class
Matches	9
Runs scored	70
Batting average	5.83
100s/50s	0/0
Top score	19
Balls bowled	1,245
Wickets	23
Bowling average	32.73
5 wickets in innings	0
10 wickets in match	0
Best bowling	4/39
Catches/stumpings	2/–
- Source: Cricinfo, 7 January 2026

Munawwar Ali Khan (24 December 1924 – 21 October 2013) was a Pakistani cricketer.

A right-arm fast bowler, Khan played first-class cricket for East Pakistan, Northern India and Sind between 1944 and 1955. He represented Pakistan against the West Indian touring team, the Commonwealth XI and the MCC touring team in the years before Pakistan played Test cricket. His availability to play was affected by the demands of his employer, a shipping company in Karachi.
