= Niaz Ahmed (cricketer) =

Pakistani cricketer

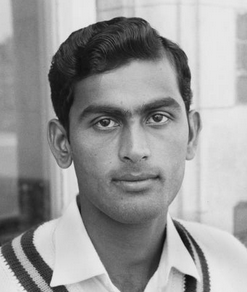
- Niaz Ahmed in 1967

Personal information
- Full name: Niaz Ahmed Siddiqi
- Born: 11 November 1945; Varanasi, British India
- Died: 12 April 2000 (aged 54); Karachi, Pakistan
- Batting: Right-handed
- Bowling: Right-arm fast-medium

International information
- National side: Pakistan
- Test debut (cap 55): 10 August 1967 v England
- Last Test: 28 February 1969 v England

Domestic team information
- Years: Team
- 1964–65: Dacca
- 1965–66 to 1969–70, 1971–72 to 1973–74: Public Works Department
- 1966–67 to 1968–69: East Pakistan
- 1970–71: Pakistan Railways

Career statistics
Competition	Tests	FC
Matches	2	39
Runs scored	17	466
Batting average	–	14.56
100s/50s	0/0	0/3
Top score	16*	71*
Balls bowled	294	5185
Wickets	3	62
Bowling average	31.33	38.45
5 wickets in innings	0	1
10 wickets in match	0	0
Best bowling	2/72	5/86
Catches/stumpings	1/–	31/–
- Source: ESPNcricinfo, 15 June 2017

Niaz Ahmed Siddiqi (11 November 1945 – 12 April 2000) was a Pakistani cricketer from East Pakistan (which later became Bangladesh) who played in two Tests in 1967 and 1969. He was the only East Pakistani to play Test cricket for Pakistan.

== Early career ==
Ahmed was born in Benares, and his family moved to Dacca in East Pakistan after the independence of Pakistan in 1947. A fast-medium bowler and tailend batsman, he made his first-class debut for Dacca in March 1966 against Karachi Whites in the Quaid-e-Azam Trophy, taking three catches and three wickets in the first innings.

He joined the Pakistan Public Works Department, where he worked as an engineer, and played for the Public Works Department cricket team from May 1966. When the touring MCC Under-25 team in 1966–67 played three matches against a Pakistan Under-25 team, he played in the second match, in Dacca, taking one wicket.

== Playing for Pakistan ==
After five first-class matches in which he had bowled only 84 overs and taken seven wickets, Ahmed was selected to tour England with the Pakistan team in 1967. Owing to injuries among his teammates he played 11 of the 17 first-class matches and bowled more overs than any of the other pace bowlers, taking 25 wickets at 34.52. Reporting on the tour in Wisden, Qamaruddin Butt referred to him as "an acquisition".

In his first match on tour he took 5 for 86 (the only time in his career when he took more than three wickets in an innings) against Kent. In the match against Minor Counties he went to the wicket in the second innings with the score at 94 for 9 and the Pakistanis leading by only 72. Although his previous best score was only 15, he hit 69, "driving fearlessly and snicking luckily", added 124 for the last wicket with Salahuddin, and then took two early wickets to help the Pakistanis to a narrow victory.

With Saleem Altaf injured and Arif Butt out of form, Ahmed was selected for the Second Test. He took 2 for 72 off 37 overs in the first innings, but Pakistan lost, and Altaf, fit again, replaced him for the Third Test.

He played for a BCCP XI against the touring International XI in 1967–68, and for a strong President's XI against the touring Commonwealth XI a few weeks later, but without notable success. He played for another BCCP XI against the MCC in 1968–69, and was selected to replace Asif Masood as Pakistan's leading pace bowler for the Second Test in Dacca. His selection owed more to the BCCP's desire to include an East Pakistan player to try to appease local political protesters than to his own or Masood's form. He took one wicket off 12 overs in the drawn match and Masood returned to the side for the Third Test in Karachi.

According to Shaharyar Khan, it was not the only time Ahmed was used for political purposes: "There was a club-level cricketer from Dhaka called Niaz Ahmed who was Pakistan's perennial 12th man for quite some time, the Pakistan Cricket Board attempting to give the entirely unconvincing impression that East Pakistan was on the verge of national representation. The fact was that no effort was made by the governments of Pakistan or by the cricket boards to promote cricket in East Pakistan."

== Later career ==
After 1968–69, in 14 more first-class matches, Ahmed took only 11 more wickets. In 1969–70, batting at number eight for Public Works Department against Bahawalpur, he made his highest score, 71 not out, top-scoring for Public Works Department and taking them to a narrow first-innings lead.

When Bangladesh achieved independence in 1972, Ahmed moved to Karachi. He captained Public Works Department in his last two matches in 1973–74. They won his last match but were then disqualified from the Patron's Trophy "due to the inclusion of ineligible players".

Between 1996 and 2000 he served as a referee in a number of first-class and List A matches in Pakistan.
