= Tariq Cheema =

Pakistani cricketer (born 1947)

Personal information
- Full name: Tariq Munir Cheema
- Born: 25 March 1947 (age 79); Lahore, British India
- Batting: Right-handed
- Bowling: Right-arm medium-fast

Career statistics
Competition	First-class
Matches	30
Runs scored	268
Batting average	10.72
100s/50s	0/1
Top score	57*
Balls bowled	4653
Wickets	93
Bowling average	23.36
5 wickets in innings	3
10 wickets in match	1
Best bowling	7/58
Catches/stumpings	11/–
- Source: Cricinfo, 4 May 2014

Tariq Munir Cheema (born 25 March 1947) is a former cricketer who played first-class cricket for numerous teams in Pakistan from 1964 to 1976.

An opening bowler, Tariq Cheema had his best season on his debut in 1964-65 at the age of 17. He was the second-highest wicket-taker in the Ayub Trophy, with 34 at an average of 15.85 for the student team of Lahore Education Board, who finished runners-up in the competition. In the victory over Combined Services he took 6 for 62 and 7 for 58.

Cheema was an umpire at senior level in Pakistan from 1997–98 to 2003–04, officiating in 11 first-class and 13 List A matches.
