= Mohammad Saeed (cricketer, born 1910) =

Pakistani cricketer (1910–1979)

Personal information
- Full name: Mian Mohammad Saeed
- Born: 31 August 1910; Lahore, British India
- Died: 23 August 1979 (aged 68); Lahore, Pakistan
- Batting: Right-handed
- Relatives: Yawar Saeed (son); Fazal Mahmood (son-in-law)

Domestic team information
- Years: Team
- 1929/30: Muslims
- 1933/34–1945/46: Southern Punjab
- 1945/46–1946/47: North Zone
- 1947/48–1954/55: Punjab

Career statistics
Competition	First-class
Matches	53
Runs scored	2,439
Batting average	29.74
100s/50s	3/13
Top score	175
Balls bowled	514
Wickets	5
Bowling average	53.60
5 wickets in innings	0
10 wickets in match	0
Best bowling	1/6
Catches/stumpings	31/–
- Source: ESPNcricinfo, 11 February 2015

Mian Mohammad Saeed (31 August 1910 – 23 August 1979) was a Pakistani cricketer, born in Lahore. He was the first captain of the Pakistan cricket team.

== Career ==
A right-handed batsman, Mohammad was the first captain of Pakistan, before they were awarded Test status. He led Pakistan against the touring West Indies team in 1948-49, when he scored a century in the drawn match, and also led them against Ceylon in Ceylon in 1948-49 (Pakistan's first cricket tour) and in Pakistan in 1949–50.

In a career that extended from 1930 to 1954, he played for various Indian teams, including Southern Punjab and Northern India in the Ranji Trophy in the 1930s and 1940s, and for Punjab cricket teams in Pakistan in the late 1940s and 1950s. In all first-class matches he made 2439 runs at an average of 29.74 with three centuries and a highest score of 175 for Northern India against Southern Punjab in the Ranji Trophy in 1946–47, when he captained Northern India to a 195-run victory.

His son Yawar Saeed played for Somerset, and his daughter married the Pakistani Test bowler Fazal Mahmood.

After retirement he served as a cricket administrator and at the time of his sudden death he was chairman of the Pakistan Test selectors.
