= Ireland women against Scotland women in Spain in 2023–24 =

International cricket tour

Ireland and Scotland women's cricket teams in Spain in 2023–24
	Ireland	Scotland
- Dates: 17 – 24 October 2023
Captains	Laura Delany	Kathryn Bryce

One Day International series
- Results: Ireland won the 3-match series 2–1
Most runs	Leah Paul (171)	Kathryn Bryce (228)
Most wickets	Arlene Kelly (8)	Hannah Rainey (8)

Twenty20 International series
- Results: 2-match series drawn 1–1
Most runs	Amy Hunter (78)	Sarah Bryce (60)
Most wickets	Alana Dalzell (3)	Priyanaz Chatterji (3); Olivia Bell (3)

The Ireland women's cricket team and Scotland women's cricket team played three One Day International (ODI) and two Twenty20 International (T20I) matches at the Desert Springs Cricket Ground in Almería, Spain in October 2023. The ODIs were the first played by Scotland since regaining official ODI status in November 2022, coming over 20 years after the team's previous ODI fixtures at the 2003 IWCC Trophy.

Scotland won the first ODI by 40 runs. Ireland set up a series decider by winning the second ODI by 79 runs. The Irish side completed a 2–1 series win with a 33-run victory in the third ODI.

The first of two T20Is was won by Ireland by 7 wickets, giving the Irish an unassailable lead in the series. Scotland won the second T20I by 8 wickets to draw the series 1–1.

== Squads ==
Ireland		Scotland
ODIs	T20Is	ODIs and T20Is
Laura Delany (c); Ava Canning; Alana Dalzell; Georgina Dempsey; Amy Hunter (wk); Arlene Kelly; Gaby Lewis; Louise Little; Joanna Loughran; Sophie MacMahon; Cara Murray; Leah Paul; Orla Prendergast; Freya Sargent; Rebecca Stokell	Laura Delany (c); Ava Canning; Alana Dalzell; Georgina Dempsey; Sarah Forbes; Amy Hunter (wk); Arlene Kelly; Gaby Lewis; Louise Little; Joanna Loughran; Sophie MacMahon; Aimee Maguire; Cara Murray; Leah Paul; Orla Prendergast	Kathryn Bryce (c); Olivia Bell; Sarah Bryce (wk); Darcey Carter; Priyanaz Chatterji; Maryam Faisal; Lorna Jack; Ailsa Lister (wk); Abtaha Maqsood; Megan McColl; Hannah Rainey; Niamh Robertson-Jack; Nayma Sheikh; Ellen Watson

== ODI series ==
=== 1st ODI ===
17 October 2023
10:45
Scorecard

Scotland; 211 (47.2 overs)	v	Ireland; 171 (41.4 overs)
Kathryn Bryce 78 (103); Laura Delany 2/23 (8 overs)		Leah Paul 43 (71); Hannah Rainey 3/30 (6.2 overs)

Scotland won by 40 runs
Desert Springs Cricket Ground, Almería
Umpires: Roland Black (Ire) and Aidan Seaver (Ire)

- Ireland won the toss and elected to field.
- Freya Sargent (Ire), Olivia Bell, Kathryn Bryce, Sarah Bryce, Darcey Carter, Priyanaz Chatterji, Lorna Jack, Ailsa Lister, Abtaha Maqsood, Megan McColl, Hannah Rainey and Ellen Watson (Sco) all made their ODI debuts.

=== 2nd ODI ===
19 October 2023
10:45
Scorecard

Ireland; 270/6 (50 overs)	v	Scotland; 191 (39 overs)
Orla Prendergast 64 (73); Kathryn Bryce 2/44 (10 overs)		Kathryn Bryce 67 (58); Ava Canning 4/36 (8 overs)

Ireland won by 79 runs
Desert Springs Cricket Ground, Almería
Umpires: Mark Hawthorne (Ire) and Aidan Seaver (Ire)

- Ireland won the toss and elected to bat.

=== 3rd ODI ===
21 October 2023
10:45
Scorecard

Ireland; 239/4 (50 overs)	v	Scotland; 206 (49 overs)
Leah Paul 70 (110); Hannah Rainey 5/41 (9 overs)		Kathryn Bryce 83 (108); Arlene Kelly 4/35 (9 overs)

Ireland won by 33 runs
Desert Springs Cricket Ground, Almería
Umpires: Ryan Milne (Sco) and Sue Redfern (Eng)

- Ireland won the toss and elected to bat.
- Maryam Faisal and Nayma Sheikh (Sco) both made their ODI debuts.

== T20I series ==
=== 1st T20I ===
23 October 2023
14:00
Scorecard

Scotland; 91 (18.4 overs)	v	Ireland; 92/3 (16.3 overs)
Darcey Carter 45 (55); Laura Delany 2/7 (2 overs)		Gaby Lewis 53 (51); Olivia Bell 2/20 (4 overs)

Ireland won by 7 wickets
Desert Springs Cricket Ground, Almería
Umpires: Roland Black (Ire) and Aidan Seaver (Ire)
Player of the match: Gaby Lewis (Ire)

- Scotland won the toss and elected to bat.
- Alana Dalzell (Ire) made her T20I debut.

=== 2nd T20I ===
24 October 2023
14:00
Scorecard

Ireland; 117/7 (20 overs)	v	Scotland; 121/2 (19.1 overs)
Amy Hunter 68 (54); Priyanaz Chatterji 2/18 (4 overs)		Sarah Bryce 57* (44); Ava Canning 1/12 (3 overs)

Scotland won by 8 wickets
Desert Springs Cricket Ground, Almería
Umpires: Roland Black (Ire) and Aidan Seaver (Ire)
Player of the match: Sarah Bryce (Sco)

- Ireland won the toss and elected to bat.
