= Lall Singh =

Indian Test cricketer

Personal information
- Full name: Lall Singh Gill
- Born: 16 December 1909; Kuala Lumpur, Federated Malay States, British Malaya
- Died: 19 November 1985 (aged 75); Kuala Lumpur, Malaysia
- Batting: Right-handed
- Bowling: Right-arm slow-medium
- Role: Batsman

International information
- National side: India (1932)
- Only Test (cap 4): 25 June 1932 v England

Domestic team information
- Years: Team
- 1933–1936: Patiala
- 1935–1936: Southern Punjab
- 1934–1935: Hindus
- 1935: Maharaja of Patiala's XI
- 1935: Cricket Club of India
- 1934: Retrievers

Career statistics
Competition	Test	First-class
Matches	1	32
Runs scored	44	1123
Batting average	22.00	24.95
100s/50s	0/0	1/5
Top score	29	107*
Balls bowled	0	80
Wickets	–	1
Bowling average	–	59.00
5 wickets in innings	–	0
10 wickets in match	–	0
Best bowling	–	1/9
Catches/stumpings	1/0	23/0
- Source: ESPNcricinfo, 9 May 2020

Lall Singh (Punjabi: ਲਾਲ ਸਿੰਘ, romanized: Lāla sigha; 16 December 1909 – 19 November 1985) was an early Indian Test cricketer from British Malaya.

== Cricket career ==
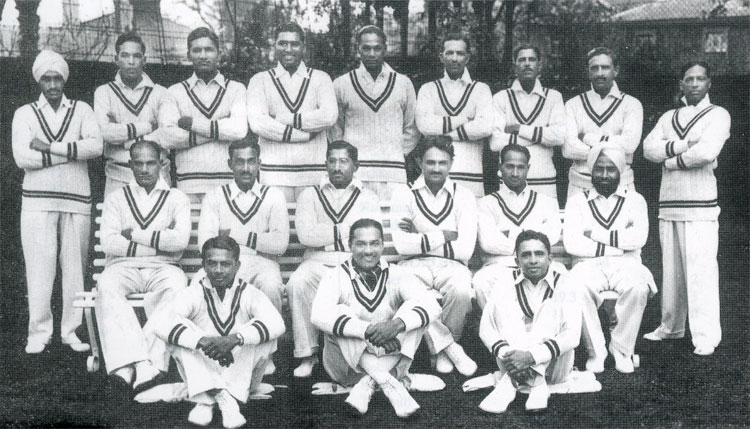
Lall Singh is seen standing first from right in photo of 1932 Test team captained by Maharaja of Porbandar, that toured England.

Lall Singh, whose full name was Lall Singh Gill, was born in Kuala Lumpur, Malaya on 16 December 1909 and died at Petaling Jaya, Kuala Lumpur on 19 November 1985. He was a member of India's team on its one-Test inaugural tour of England in 1932. He was a right-handed batsman and an outstanding fielder. In the only Test played during the tour he scored 29 in the second innings, adding 74 runs in partnership with Amar Singh in 40 minutes. During England's first innings, he ran out Frank Woolley with a magnificent pick up and throw on the opening morning.

Lall Singh's was a prominent name in the matches played in Kuala Lumpur between 1926 and 1940. In August 1931 he scored 138 for Federated Malay States against Straits Settlements at The Padang, Singapore. Three years later in the same fixture, he had 118 to his name.

== Early life ==
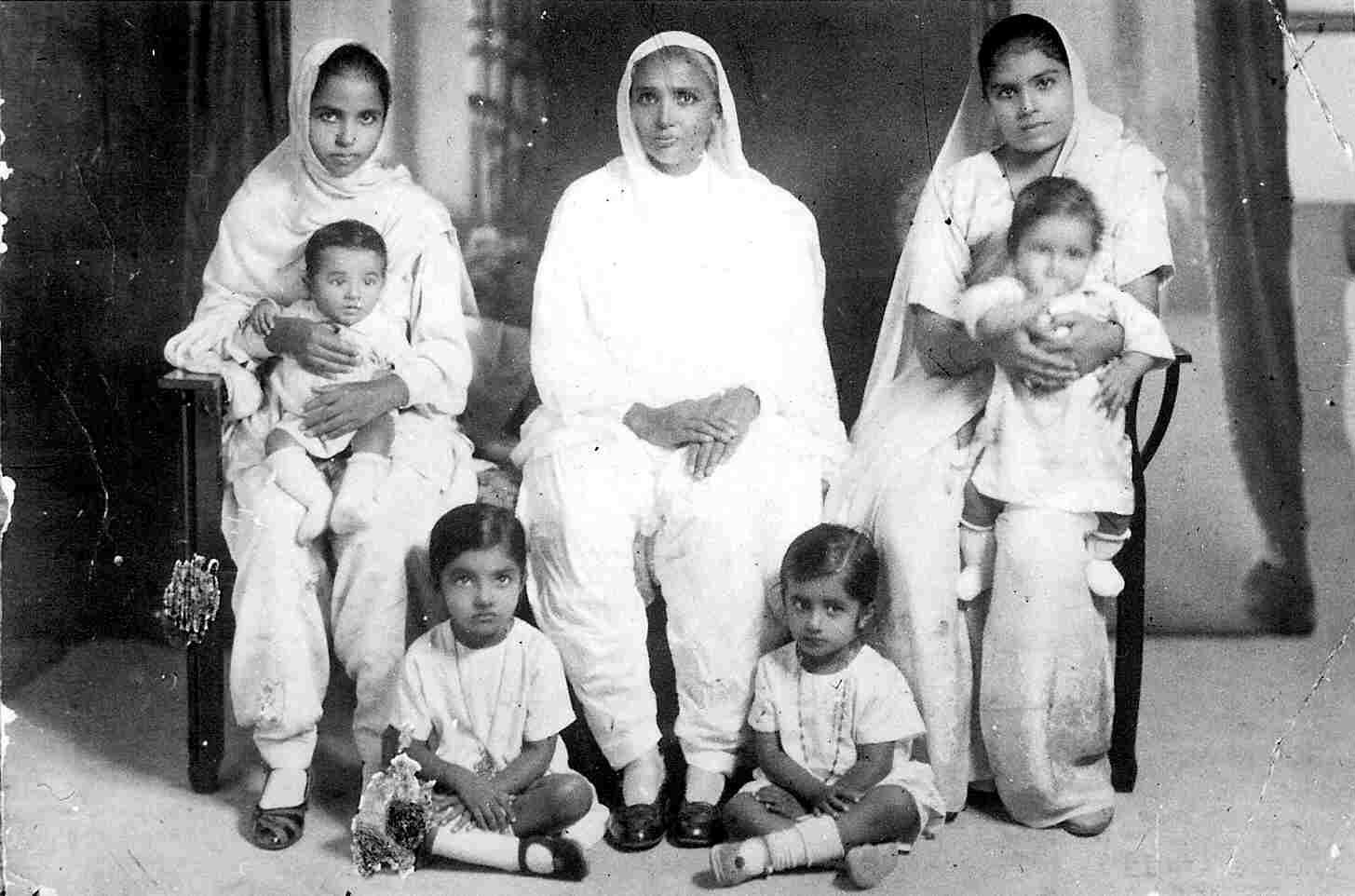
Seated Left to Right: Wife of SS Gill with son on lap, Mother of Lall Singh, Wife of BS Gill with sister's son on lap. On Floor Left to Right: Elder daughter of SS Gill, Ajmer Kaur later Neelum Shamsi and mother of Tariq B Shamsi; Younger daughter of SS Gill, Amar Kaur

Lall Singh was born into the affluent Gill Jat family of Malaya, who had migrated to Malaya from India 3 generations before. He was the youngest of 3 sons, the eldest being Santha Singh Gill (maternal grandfather of Tariq B Shamsi) and middle brother being Bishen Singh Gill.

All three brothers studied at the prestigious Victoria Institution (V.I.) in Kuala Lumpur that had been set up under the auspices of Sultan Abdul Samad ibni Almarhum Raja Abdullah KCMG, the fourth Sultan of Selangor, and was named after Queen Victoria. Victoria Institution or V.I. as it was and is known, had been opened specially to commemorate the golden jubilee of her reign. V.I. has had many honourable and distinguished individuals among its alumni, including royals like the Sultan Hassanal Bolkiah - Sultan of Brunei and other royalty. Complete list that includes name of Lall Singh is available at viweb website

== Lall Singh at Victoria Institution and Cricket in India ==
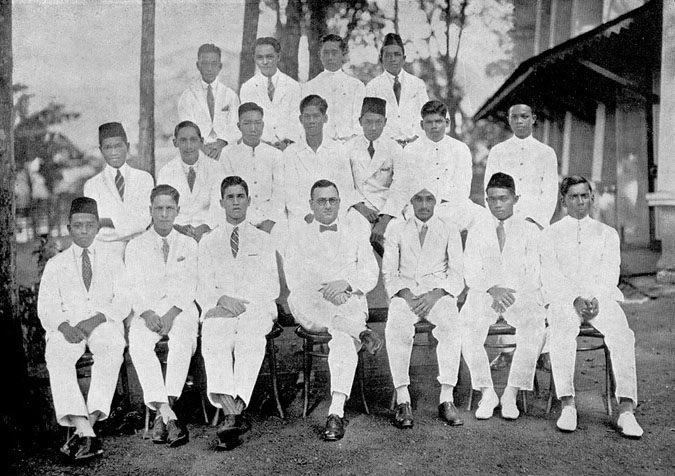
Prefects Victoria Institution 1928. Lall Singh seated third from right

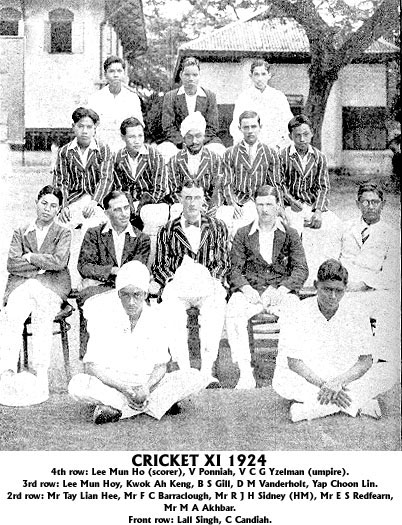
Lall Singh and BS Gill Victoria Institution Cricket Team 1924

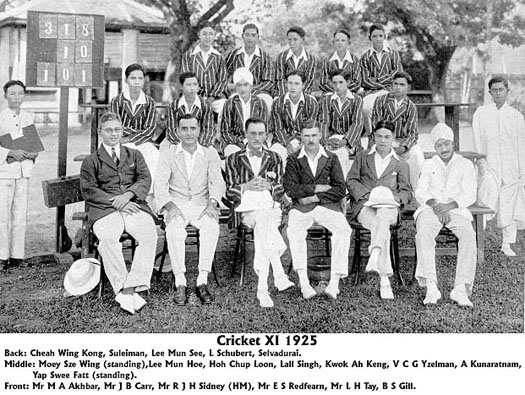
BS Gill and Lall Singh, Victoria Institution Cricket Team 1925

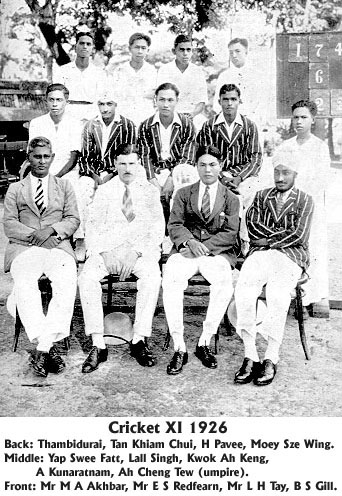
Lall Singh and BS Gill, Victoria Institution Cricket Team 1926

Being highly passionate to play cricket at the highest possible level, he convinced his mother to allow and sponsor him to play cricket in India. The family accordingly approached Maharajah Patiala, Bhupindar Singh who was known to the family. Maharajah Bhupindir Singh, himself a good cricketer and lover of the game, advised the family to send Lall Singh to Patiala to play in his team, Maharajah Patiala XI, which was led by the Maharajah himself. He reached Patiala in 1931 and in the company of Maharajah Bupindar Singh developed his lifelong love for the 'Patiala Peg'. The next year Lall Singh was selected for India's inaugural tour to England in 1932. The Captain of the team was to be Maharajah Bhupindar Singh but a few weeks before the departure of the team, he fell ill and the Natwarsinhji Bhavsinhji, the Maharajah of Porbundar replaced him as captain.

In 1934–35, Lall Singh represented Hindus in the Bombay Quadrangular tournament and South Punjab in the inaugural Ranji Trophy. The South Punjab team was led by the Maharajah of Patiala Bhupindar Singh. Notable players who played alongside the Maharajah and Lall Singh were Lala Amarnath, Mohammad Saeed, Nazir Ali and Nissar Mohammad. In the first match against United Provinces, batting at number 8, Lall Singh scored 56, the highest in the Southern Punjab's only innings.

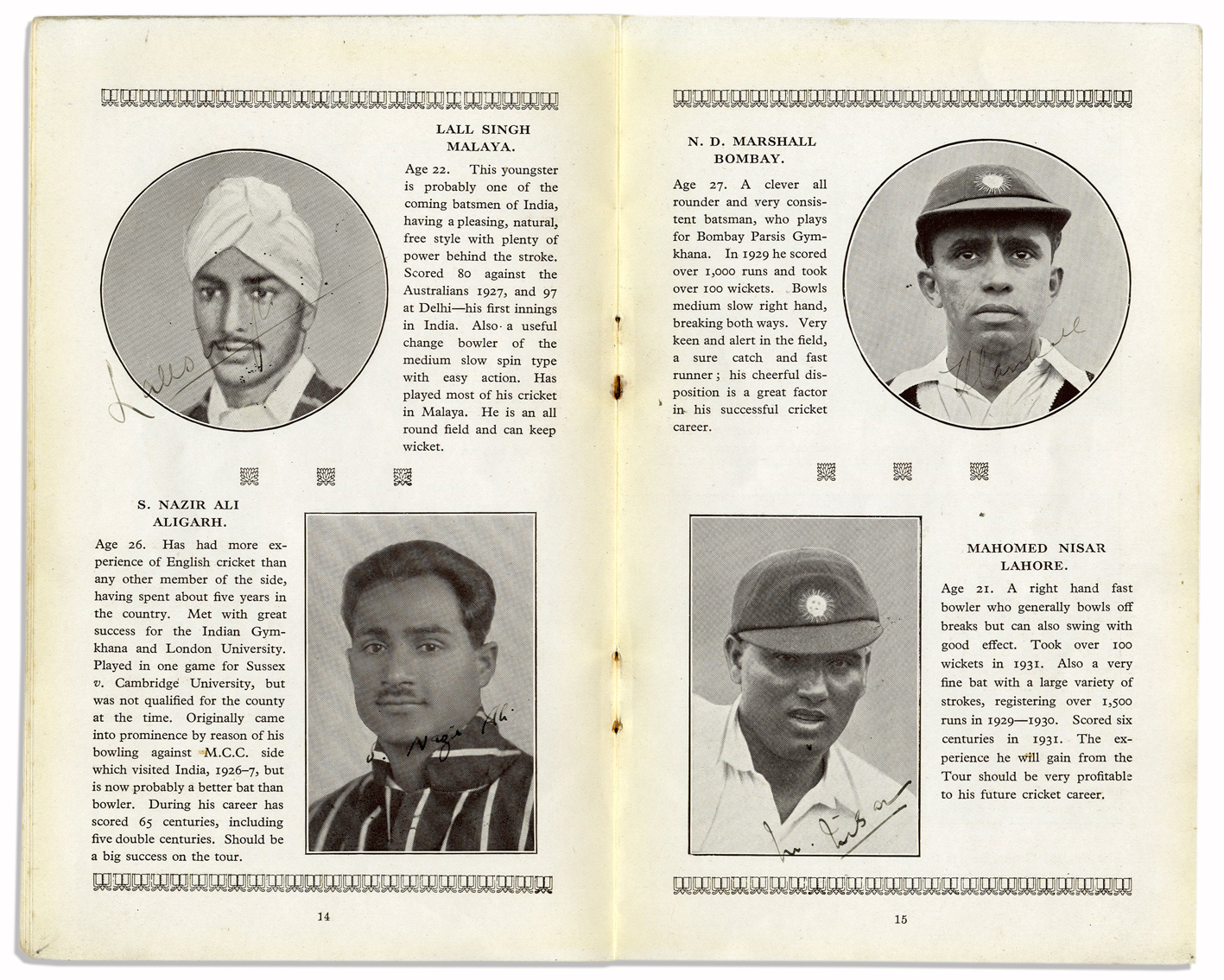

He represented India in an unofficial 'Test' at Bombay against Jack Ryder's Australian side in 1935–36.

Lall Singh's sole first-class hundred (107 not out) came in the 1935-36 Bombay Quadrangular Tournament for Hindus against Parsees at Gymkhana Ground, Bombay. Walking in with his team's score at 99–6, he shared an unbeaten stand of 132 for 8th wicket with a somewhat subdued, Vijay Merchant (30 not out).

Maharajah Bhupindar Singh was very fond of Lall Singh and this closeness of Lall Singh to the Maharajah gave rise to many enemies, as a result of which, there was an attempt on the life of Lall Singh in 1936. He was seriously injured but survived. After recovery, with the permission of Maharajah Bhupindar Singh, he left for Paris in 1936.

== Falling in Love and Paris ==
While in India, he met Myrtle Watkins, an Afro-American singer, who was performing at the Taj Mahal Hotel in Bombay. After recovering from his injuries, he and Myrtle proceeded to Paris, where Lall Singh opened a night club for Myrtle to perform nightly. The money to open the night club was sent to Lall Singh by his mother.

From Paris he send a studio photograph of himself and Myrtle to the family, behind which he had written, ‘This is she and this is me ….. very soon and we might be three’.

Unfortunately, this affair did not last long and Myrtel and Lall Singh parted ways and selling off his night club he returned to Malaya in August 1939. The following month Germany invaded Poland and that was the beginning of WWII. Japan attacked Pearl Harbor on 7 December 1941 and started the gradual occupation of Malaya the following day. By 31 January 1942 the whole of the Malayan peninsula had been was captured by Japan.

== Second World War ==
In June 1942, SS Gill, the eldest brother of Lall Singh was arrested by the Japanese as he was helping British Army officers to escape from Malaya to Singapore. The following day his brothers BS Gill and Lall Singh were also arrested, all their assets including three houses, rubber plantation and a gold mine were confiscated by the Japanese. Within 3 months SS Gill and BS Gill were hanged by the Japanese occupation forces for helping the British and Lall Singh was sent to a slave labour camp in Borneo.

SS Gill's elder daughter Ajmer Kaur (later Neelum Shamsi), then only 15 years old, was allowed to live in a portion of one house with her younger sister and paternal grandmother. However, the Mother Superior, of the sprawling Bukit Nanas Convent in Kuala Lumpur, where Ajmer Kaur and her sister Amar Kaur studied, took both the sisters and their paternal grandmother into the Convent and kept them there and looked after them for the duration of the War. Lall Singh, managed to escape from the slave labour camp in Borneo and make his way back to Kuala Lumpur in August 1945. When he was reunited with his mother and two nieces he was mere skeleton of the person he used to be. He had been tortured so badly that his own mother initially refused to recognise him as her son.

== After the War ==
After the War

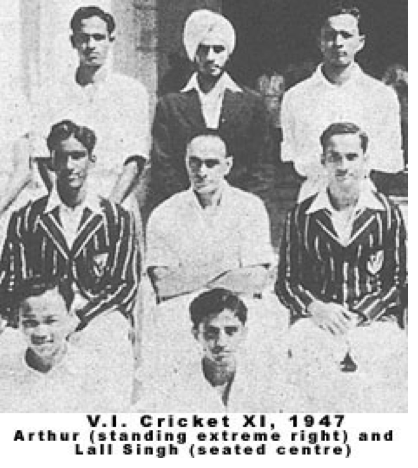

Japan surrendered to the Allied forces on 5 September 1945. The immediate problem facing Lall Singh was how to look after and care for his ailing mother and two nieces as the family had been left penniless due to Japan's occupation of Malaya. Lall Singh had never worked in his life and was too proud to knock on anyone's door for help. Immediately, he started to look for a job and the only one in post war ravaged Malaya was that of groundsman at the acclaimed Selangor Club in Kuala Lumpur.

While in captivity, the Japanese had shaved his head and beard. Thereafter, he never again grew his hair or beard or wore a turban.

A.B. Shamsi, (Baseer Shamsi) then a captain in the British Indian Army, was posted from Burma to Malaya, Kuala Lumpur and being a keen cricketer, he went to the Selangor Club to play cricket and was surprised to meet Lall Singh working as groundsman at the club. In 1946, A.B. Shamsi, married Lall Singh's elder niece Ajmer Kaur, who converted to Islam taking the maiden name of Neelum, on 11 September 1946.

In 1950, Sultan Sir Hishamuddin Alam Shah Al-Haj, the Sultan of Selangor, a friend of the Gill family, visited the Selangor Club and was shocked to see Lall Singh working as a groundsman. To cut a long story short, the Sultan started the process of rehabilitating the estates of the Gill family to Lall Singh. Since most of the estates, fixed and moveable assets were in the name of Lall Singh's mother who had died in 1946 and SS Gill who had been hanged in 1942, it took over 2 years for these properties to be reissued in the name of Lall Singh in 1953.

Lall Singh, spent rest of his days travelling abroad, mostly to Paris on a yearly basis in summer. He died peacefully on 19 November 1985 in Petaling Jaya, Kuala Lumpur. An inter school cricket tournament is held annually in Kuala Lumpur for the ‘Lall Singh Shield’. The Sikh community in Malaysia, organise an annual tournament between clubs for the ‘Lall Singh Trophy’.

== Golden Jubilee ==
He was one of oldest players to attend the Golden Jubilee Test in Bombay in 1980 to celebrate the 50th anniversary of the founding of BCCI.

== See also ==
- List of Test cricketers born in non-Test playing nations
