= Abdul Dyer =

Pakistani cricketer (1936–2021)

Personal information
- Full name: Abdur Rehman Dyer
- Born: 15 August 1936; Ahmedabad, Gujarat, British India
- Died: 13 July 2021 (aged 84); Karachi, Sindh, Pakistan
- Batting: Right-handed
- Role: Batsman

Domestic team information
- Years: Team
- 1956/57–1965/66: Karachi Whites
- 1963/64–1969/70: Karachi Blues

Career statistics
Competition	First-class
Matches	18
Runs scored	428
Batting average	21.40
100s/50s	0/4
Top score	77*
Balls bowled	144
Wickets	4
Bowling average	15.25
5 wickets in innings	0
10 wickets in match	0
Best bowling	2/23
Catches/stumpings	2/–
- Source: Cricinfo, 1 May 2026

Abdur Rehman Dyer (15 August 1936 – 13 July 2021) was a Pakistani industrialist, cricketer and cricket patron. He was a right-handed batsman who played first-class cricket for Karachi sides between 1955/56 and 1969/70. He was born in Ahmedabad, Gujarat, in British India, and later settled in Karachi after the partition of India.

Dyer inherited his interest in cricket from his family. His father, Ramzan "Ramjoo" Dyer, and his uncle, Haji Noor Mohammad Dyer, had established Dyer Cricket Club in Ahmedabad before the family moved to Pakistan after independence and re-established the club in Karachi. In 1955, he toured England with the Pakistan Eaglets, a developmental side for young Pakistani cricketers.

He made his first-class debut for Amir of Bahawalpur's XI against the touring Marylebone Cricket Club in January 1956. His second first-class match, for Karachi Whites against Sind, brought his highest score: an unbeaten 77 in the 1956–57 Quaid-e-Azam Trophy, during a ninth-wicket partnership of 140 with a teenage Mushtaq Mohammad, who made 87. He later appeared in first-class cricket for Karachi A and Karachi Blues, and also played representative matches for Pakistan Eaglets, Punjab Governor's XI and BCCP XI.

Outside cricket, Dyer was an industrialist in Karachi. He owned Dyer Textile Mills and Modern Studios, and was widely regarded as a benefactor of Pakistan cricket, helping support cricketers of his era. He died in Karachi on 13 July 2021, aged 84.
