= Maryam Faisal =

Scottish cricketer (born 2005)

Personal information
- Born: 7 July 2005 (age 21)
- Batting: Right-handed
- Bowling: Right-arm leg break
- Role: Wicket-keeper
- Relatives: Naushad Ali (grandfather); Ibrahim Faisal (twin brother)

International information
- National side: Scotland
- ODI debut (cap 29): 21 October 2023 v Ireland
- Last ODI: 18 April 2025 v Ireland
- T20I debut (cap 26): 6 September 2023 v Italy
- Last T20I: 16 August 2024 v Netherlands

Career statistics
Competition	WODI	WT20I
Matches	2	6
Runs scored	30	24
Batting average	15.00	4.80
100s/50s	0/0	0/0
Top score	26	8
Catches/stumpings	0/0	1/0
- Source: Cricinfo, 15 April 2025

Maryam Faisal (born 7 July 2005) is a Scottish cricketer who plays as a wicket-keeper-batter for the national women's team. She was named in the Scotland squad for the 2025 Women's Cricket World Cup Qualifier.

== Early and personal life ==
Faisal was educated at the High School of Glasgow. As of 2023, she planned to study medicine at university after leaving school. She has a twin brother, Ibrahim Faisal, who has represented the Scotland national under-19 cricket team. Their grandfather Naushad Ali was a Test cricketer for Pakistan. Faisal followed her brother into trying cricket at the age of 8, but was initially discouraged from taking it seriously as it was seen as more of a boys' sport. She only committed seriously to her cricket career after being selected for the Western Warriors regional under-18 team in her early teens.

== Career ==
Faisal plays domestic cricket for two Glasgow clubs, Clydesdale and West of Scotland. She was selected for the Scotland under-19 team at the 2023 Under-19 Women's T20 World Cup in South Africa, as part of the first Scotland squad to qualify for the tournament. The following year, her brother Ibrahim played for Scotland at the equivalent men's tournament.

Faisal made her Women's Twenty20 International debut for Scotland in a nine-wicket win against Italy on 6 September 2023, in a 2023 Women's T20 World Cup Europe Qualifier match at Almeria, Spain. She then made her Women's One Day International debut during Scotland's series against Ireland, also played at Almeria, the following month.

After the withdrawal of Ellen Watson, Faisal was added to the Scotland squad for the 2025 Women's Cricket World Cup Qualifier tournament in Pakistan.
