= Qamaruddin Butt =

Pakistani cricketer (1914–1974)

Personal information
- Born: 1914; Amritsar, Punjab, India
- Died: 8 June 1974 (aged 59–60); Rawalpindi, Pakistan
- Batting: Right-handed
- Bowling: Right-arm leg-spin

Domestic team information
- Years: Team
- 1933-34, 1937-38: Southern Punjab
- 1935-36: Northern India
- 1946-47: Delhi

Umpiring information
- Tests umpired: 1 (1965)
- FC umpired: 53 (1954–1973)

Career statistics
Competition	First-class
Matches	7
Runs scored	225
Batting average	20.45
100s/50s	0/1
Top score	59
Balls bowled	362
Wickets	7
Bowling average	30.00
5 wickets in innings	–
10 wickets in match	–
Best bowling	3/33
Catches/stumpings	7/–
- Source: Cricket Archive, 5 September 2015

Qamaruddin Butt (1914 – 8 June 1974) was a Pakistani cricket player, writer and umpire. He stood in one Test match, Pakistan v New Zealand, in 1965.

== Playing career ==
A batsman, leg-spin bowler and occasional wicket-keeper, Butt played seven first-class matches for various Punjab teams from 1933 to 1947, including four matches in the Ranji Trophy for Southern Punjab, Northern India and Delhi. His highest score was 59 for a one-off team called the North India Free Lancers against Sind in 1936-37. In the only match in which he kept wicket, a semi-final of the Ranji Trophy in 1935-36, he took five catches in a narrow loss for Northern India to Bombay.

== Umpiring career ==
Butt umpired 53 first-class matches between 1954 and 1973, including four Quaid-e-Azam Trophy finals and several semi-finals. His first match as umpire was the inaugural final in 1953-54. From 1953-54 to 1959-60 he mostly umpired matches in the south of Pakistan in Karachi and nearby Hyderabad, but later most of his matches were in the north, in Rawalpindi and Peshawar. His only Test as umpire was also the only Test ever held at the Pindi Club Ground in Rawalpindi, when Pakistan defeated New Zealand in March 1965.

== Writing career ==
In parallel with his umpiring career, Butt was also a prolific chronicler of Pakistan’s Test cricket in the 1950s and 1960s. Drawing on his own observations and the reports of others, and known for his colourful use of language, he wrote 10 books (in English) covering most of Pakistan's international cricket from 1954 to 1969:

- Pakistan on Cricket Map: Fully Covering Pakistan's Cricket Tour of England 1954, Together with Complete Averages, Records and Action Photos (1955)
- Cricket without Challenge (1955) (on the series Pakistan v India in 1954-55)
- Pakistan Cricket on the March: Containing Complete Eye-Witness Accounts of the Tours of New Zealand, M.C.C. "A" and Australian Teams to Pakistan, Quaid-e-Azam Trophy 1956-57 and Averages of All the Previous Official Series (1957)
- Cricket Wonders: Containing a Complete Account of Pakistan Team's Tour of the West Indies in 1958 (1959)
- Cricket Ups and Downs: Containing a Complete Eye-Witness Account of West Indies Tour of Pakistan in 1959 (1960)
- Cricket Cat and Mouse: Australians' Tour of Pakistan in 1959 (1961)
- Playing for a Draw: Covering Pakistan’s Tour of India 1960-61 (1962)
- Cricket Re-Born: Covering Commonwealth Cricket Team’s Tour in Pakistan, 1963 (1964)
- The Oval Memories: Eye-Witness Accounts of the Pakistan Cricket Team's Tour of England 1967 (1968)
- Sporting Wickets: Eye-Witness Accounts of Tours of M.C.C. and New Zealand to Pakistan 1969 (1970)

He also covered the 1967 Pakistan tour of England for Wisden. John Arlott described his writing as “colloquial, parochial and enthusiastic”.

== Personal life ==
He died while cycling home from a cricket match in Rawalpindi.

His sons Javed and Shoaib had brief first-class careers in Pakistan in the late 1960s and early 1970s. Qamaruddin umpired three of Shoaib’s matches.

== See also ==
- List of Test cricket umpires
