= Pakistan Security Printing Corporation cricket team =

Pakistan Security Printing Corporation were a cricket team sponsored by the Pakistan Security Printing Corporation, the corporation that produced Pakistan's postage stamps. They played two matches of first-class cricket in the Patron's Trophy in 1977-78 and 1978–79.

In February 1978 they lost to Sargodha by an innings and 143 runs. In February 1979 they were again overwhelmed, this time by Bahawalpur, but drew the match. Twenty players represented the team in the two matches. Their highest individual score was 57. The only bowling figures of note were Aslam Khan's 6 for 154 off 47 eight-ball overs against Sargodha, a month before his 43rd birthday.
