= Nayyar Hussain =

Personal information
- Full name: Syed Nayyar Hussain
- Born: 16 January 1936 (age 90); Aligarh, Uttar Pradesh, British India
- Batting: Right-handed
- Bowling: Right-arm leg-spin

Domestic team information
- Years: Team
- 1954/55: Punjab
- 1958/59–1977/78: Combined Services
- 1964/65: Rawalpindi Greens
- 1966/67–1967/68: Lahore Greens

Career statistics
Competition	First-class
Matches	36
Runs scored	1,343
Batting average	22.38
100s/50s	1/8
Top score	125
Balls bowled	3,456
Wickets	70
Bowling average	21.61
5 wickets in innings	5
10 wickets in match	1
Best bowling	7/55
Catches/stumpings	29/–
- Source: CricketArchive, 24 June 2014

Syed Nayyar Hussain (born 16 January 1936) is a former Pakistani cricketer who played first-class cricket between 1955 and 1978.

Nayyar Hussain made his first-class debut for Central Zone against the touring Indians in 1954-55, scoring 60 not out in a team total of 123 in the first innings, and taking two wickets. Over the next few seasons he appeared regularly for Combined Services, having moderate success as a middle-order batsman and occasional leg-spinner.

He established himself as an all-rounder in 1964-65, when in six matches he took 23 wickets at an average of 14.34 and scored 427 runs at 47.44. Combined Services played two matches that season in the Ayub Trophy: he took 5 for 25 and 6 for 61 and top-scored in each innings with 57 and 28 in a four-wicket victory over Sargodha, then a few days later he took 7 for 55 and 1 for 63 and top-scored with 58 and then second-top-scored with 46 in a three-wicket loss to Lahore Education Board. Playing for Rawalpindi Greens in the Quaid-e-Azam Trophy, he scored his only first-class century, 125 against Pakistan International Airlines.

The Combined Services team went into abeyance after the 1964-65 season. Nayyar Hussain played two matches for Lahore Greens in the next three seasons. When Combined Services returned to first-class level in 1976-77 he was appointed captain, and resumed his career at the age of 41 to lead the team in the Patron's Trophy in 1976-77 and 1977-78. In his last match, against Peshawar, he bowled 59 overs and took 4 for 77 and 4 for 161.
