= Javed Masood =

East Pakistani cricketer

Cricket information
- Batting: Right-handed

Domestic team information
- Years: Team
- 1961–62 to 1963–64: East Pakistan

Career statistics
Competition	First-class
Matches	10
Runs scored	643
Batting average	37.82
100s/50s	2/1
Top score	215
Balls bowled	144
Wickets	2
Bowling average	32.50
5 wickets in innings	0
10 wickets in match	0
Best bowling	2/18
Catches/stumpings	5/–
- Source: CricketArchive, 18 May 2018

Javed Masood is a former cricketer who played first-class cricket for East Pakistan cricket teams in Pakistan from 1961 to 1968.

His highest score was 215 against Hyderabad in the Quaid-e-Azam Trophy in 1962–63, out of a team total of 376. The previous season he had made 41 and 104 against Hyderabad. East Pakistan won both matches.
