= Shamim Kabir =

Bangladeshi cricketer (1944–2019)

Anwarul Kabir Shamim (1944 – 29 July 2019) was a Bangladeshi cricketer. He led Bangladesh in its first international match, against the touring Marylebone Cricket Club (MCC), in Dhaka, in January 1977. The tall and lanky opener had a successful match, scoring 30 and 25. Kabir also captained the East Zone side at Chittagong and scored 29 in the second innings.

== First-class career ==
Kabir made his first-class cricket debut playing for East Pakistan against Karachi Greens in November 1961. In December 1964, he scored his maiden first-class half-century. Playing for Dacca University against a strong PIA bowling attack, at the Dacca Stadium (now known as Bangabandhu National Stadium), he scored 64 in the first innings. He was in good form that season, as in March 1965, he scored 55 against Dacca, in a match played at the Outer Stadium. His highest score of 89 came in January 1968, when he scored 89 in the first innings for East Pakistan (Green) against the East Pakistan Railways at the Dacca Stadium, sharing a 101-run third-wicket partnership with the skipper M. A. Latif.

Overall in his 15 first-class matches Shamim scored 411 runs at an average of 17.86. He was also an occasional wicket-keeper, with one stumping to his credit.

== After retirement ==
He retired from international cricket after the 1976–77 season. Raquibul Hasan took over the captaincy from him. After his retirement from international cricket, he got heavily involved with cricket administration, and helped in the early development of cricket in Bangladesh. He managed the national team at the ICC Trophy in 1982 and 1986. He played most of his club cricket in Dhaka, with the Azad Boys Club. He received the National Sports Award in 1999 for his service to Bangladesh cricket.

== Death ==
He died in 2019 at the age of 74.

Preceded by -	Bangladeshi cricket Captains; 1976–1977	Succeeded by Raquibul Hasan

== See also ==
- Marylebone Cricket Club cricket team in Bangladesh in 1976-77
