= Pakistani cricket team in England in 1967 =

International cricket tour

The Pakistan cricket team toured England between June and September in the 1967 season, to play a series of seventeen tour matches against various County teams, and a three-match Test series against England. England won the series 2-0 with 1 match drawn.

== Test series summary ==
=== First Test ===
27 July–1 August 1967
(5-day match)
Scorecard

England	v	Pakistan
369 (138.3 overs); KF Barrington 148 (310); Mushtaq Mohammad 3/23 (11.3 overs)		354 (182.1 overs); Hanif Mohammad 187* (556); K Higgs 3/81 (39 overs)
241/9d (90.3 overs); BL D'Oliveira 81* (176); Nasim-ul-Ghani 3/32 (13 overs)		88/3 (62 overs); Khalid Ibadulla 32 (155); KF Barrington 2/23 (13 overs)

Match drawn
Lord's, London
Umpires: CS Elliott and A Jepson

- England won the toss and elected to bat.
- 30 July was taken as a rest day.
- Saleem Altaf and Wasim Bari (both PAK) made their Test debuts.

=== Second Test ===
10–15 August 1967
(5-day match)
Scorecard

Pakistan	v	England
140 (69 overs); Saeed Ahmed 44 (73); K Higgs 4/35 (19 overs)		252/8d (134.3 overs); KF Barrington 109* (366); Asif Iqbal 2/72 (39 overs); Niaz Ahmed 2/72 (37 overs)
114 (64 overs); Saeed Ahmed 68 (153); DL Underwood 5/52 (26 overs)		3/0 (2.1 overs); MC Cowdrey 2* (2)

England won by 10 wickets
Trent Bridge, Nottingham
Umpires: JS Buller and WFF Price

- Pakistan won the toss and elected to bat.
- 13 August was taken as a rest day.
- There was no play on the fourth day.
- GG Arnold and APE Knott (both ENG), and Niaz Ahmed (PAK) made their Test debuts.

=== Third Test ===
24–28 August 1967
(5-day match)
Scorecard

Pakistan	v	England
216 (102 overs); Mushtaq Mohammad 66 (200); GG Arnold 5/58 (29 overs)		440 (167.4 overs); KF Barrington 142 (289); Mushtaq Mohammad 4/80 (26.4 overs)
255 (101.1 overs); Asif Iqbal 146 (244); K Higgs 5/58 (20 overs)		34/2 (8.2 overs); KF Barrington 13* (14); Asif Iqbal 2/14 (4 overs)

England won by 8 wickets
The Oval, London
Umpires: WFF Price and H Yarnold

- England won the toss and elected to field.
- 27 August was taken as a rest day.
- The match was scheduled for five days but completed in four.
- Ghulam Abbas (PAK) made his Test debut.

== External sources ==
- CricketArchive – tour summaries

== Annual reviews ==
- Playfair Cricket Annual 1968
- Wisden Cricketers' Almanack 1968
