= Munir Malik =

Pakistani cricketer (1934–2012)

Personal information
- Born: 10 July 1934; Leiah, British India
- Died: 30 November 2012 (aged 78); Karachi, Pakistan
- Batting: Right-handed
- Bowling: Right-arm fast-medium
- Role: Bowler

International information
- National side: Pakistan
- Test debut (cap 35): 4 December 1959 v Australia
- Last Test: 26 July 1962 v England

Career statistics
Competition	Test	First-class
Matches	3	49
Runs scored	7	675
Batting average	2.33	11.06
100s/50s	0/0	0/1
Top score	4	72
Balls bowled	684	4,285
Wickets	9	197
Bowling average	39.77	21.75
5 wickets in innings	1	14
10 wickets in match	0	4
Best bowling	5/128	8/154
Catches/stumpings	1/–	23/–
- Source: ESPNcricinfo, 29 August 2012

Munir Malik (Urdu: منيرملک; 10 July 1934 – 30 November 2012) was a Pakistani cricketer who played three Test matches for Pakistan between 1959 and 1962. A right-arm fast-medium bowler, he took nine wickets in Test cricket at an average of 39.77, including a five-wicket haul against England. During his first-class career, he took 197 wickets at the average of 21.75.

== First-class career ==
Malik played 49 first-class matches for Karachi, Punjab, Rawalpindi and Services teams during 1956–66. During his first-class career, he achieved five or more wickets in an innings on fourteen occasions, and ten or more wickets in a match four times.

Malik made his first-class debut for Punjab B during the Quaid-e-Azam Trophy, against Bahawalpur in 1956–57. He finished the season taking 13 wickets at an average of 8.30. His 5 wickets for 19 runs for Punjab B, against Punjab, was his best performance in the season. Malik played three matches during 1957–58 and his best bowling figures came against Punjab, taking 5 for 66. In the next two domestic seasons, he was more effective with the ball, taking 23 and 28 wickets respectively. Malik played a match against the Indian Starlets at Sargodha in April 1960. He took 12 wickets for 135 runs in the match. His next match was for Pakistan Eaglets against the Ceylon Cricket Association: he bowled 17 overs and took 1 wicket for 19 runs in the first innings, and captured 2 wickets for 25 runs in the second innings in 9 overs.

During the 1961–62 domestic season, Malik took 38 wickets. He was a part of the Pakistan team that toured England in 1962, where he played sixteen matches, including three Tests, and took 43 wickets at the average of 39.93. The same year he scored 72 runs for Combined Services, his career best in first-class cricket, against Sargodha. In the next three domestic seasons, he only played seven matches and took 28 wickets, including his best performance of 8 wickets for 154 runs, against the Punjab University while playing for Karachi Whites. He played his last first-class match during the Ayub Trophy in 1965–66.

== International career ==
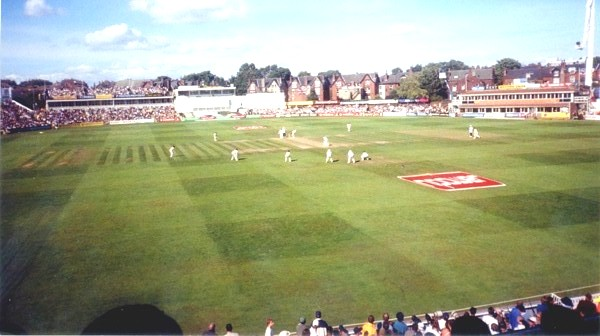
Malik achieved his solitary five-wicket haul at the Headingley Cricket Ground.

Malik made his Test debut against Australia at the National Stadium, Karachi in 1959. He took 3 wickets in the match conceding 100 runs. Malik played his next Test against England at the Headingley Cricket Ground, Leeds in July 1962. He captured 5 wickets for 128 runs in the match, which was his best bowling performance in Test cricket. He played his last Test at the Trent Bridge, Nottingham, during the same series between the teams where he only took one wicket.

== Personal life ==
Malik was born in Leiah, British India (now Pakistan) on 10 July 1934. He has five children, all daughters. On 30 November 2012, he died after a long illness at the age of 78, and was buried at the PECHS graveyard.
