= Yawar Saeed =

Pakistani cricketer (1935–2015)

Personal information
- Full name: Mian Yawar Saeed
- Born: 22 January 1935; Lahore, Punjab, British India
- Died: 21 October 2015 (aged 80); Lahore, Punjab, Pakistan
- Batting: Right-handed
- Bowling: Right-arm medium
- Relatives: Mohammad Saeed (father); Fazal Mahmood (brother-in-law)

Domestic team information
- Years: Team
- 1953–1955: Somerset
- 1953/54–1957/58: Punjab (Pakistan)
- FC debut: 22 August 1953 Somerset v Australians
- Last FC: 27 February 1959 Central Zone v West Indians

Career statistics
| Competition | First-class |
|---|---|
| Matches | 59 |
| Runs scored | 1,547 |
| Batting average | 15.47 |
| 100s/50s | 0/6 |
| Top score | 64 |
| Balls bowled | 5,891 |
| Wickets | 106 |
| Bowling average | 34.05 |
| 5 wickets in innings | 5 |
| 10 wickets in match | 0 |
| Best bowling | 5/32 |
| Catches/stumpings | 30/– |
- Source: CricketArchive, 2 May 2010

Mian Yawar Saeed (22 January 1935 – 21 October 2015) was a Pakistani cricketer, who played 50 first-class matches for Somerset County Cricket Club and nine matches for a variety of teams based in Pakistan between 1953 and 1959. A right-handed batsman and right-arm medium pace bowler, he claimed 106 career wickets.

Saeed was appointed Pakistan cricket team manager but after Pakistan's scandal-filled England tour, including match fixing allegations against team members, and after losing all three series against England he resigned from his post on 27 September 27, 2010.

On 21 October 2015, Saeed died of a brain tumour in Lahore aged 80.

He was son of Mohammad Saeed and brother to Taimur Saeed and father-in-law of Raza Rabbani.
