= Dildar Awan =

Pakistani cricketer

Personal information
- Full name: Dildar Awan
- Born: 1 November 1928; Jullundur, Punjab, British India
- Died: 7 January 2000 (aged 71); Lahore, Pakistan
- Batting: Right-handed
- Bowling: Right-arm off-spin

Domestic team information
- Years: Team
- 1958/59–1964/65: Combined Services
- 1964/65–1965/66: Sargodha
- 1969/70–1972/73: Pakistan Air Force

Career statistics
Competition	First-class
Matches	31
Runs scored	412
Batting average	11.44
100s/50s	0/0
Top score	32
Balls bowled	7828
Wickets	141
Bowling average	17.20
5 wickets in innings	6
10 wickets in match	2
Best bowling	7/65
Catches/stumpings	13/–
- Source: CricketArchive, 25 February 2014

Dildar Awan (1 November 1928 – 7 January 2000) was a Pakistani cricketer who played first-class cricket in Pakistan from 1958/59 to 1972/73. He was a right-arm off-spin bowler. He later became an umpire.

== Career with Combined Services ==
Making his first-class debut a few weeks after turning 30, Awan took 5 for 19 and 3 for 16 in his first match, for Combined Services against Rawalpindi in December 1958. He was the most successful bowler in the Quaid-i-Azam Trophy that season, taking 25 wickets at 16.36 and helping Combined Services into the final against Karachi. Karachi won the final by 279 runs, Awan taking three wickets, but the course of the match was overshadowed by the death of the 17 or 18 year old Karachi wicket-keeper Abdul Aziz. Batting late on the first day, Aziz was struck on the chest by a slow off-break from Awan, fell to the ground as he was preparing to face the next ball, never regained consciousness, and died in the ambulance on the way to hospital. It is believed the blow aggravated an existing undiagnosed heart condition. Later in the season, Awan played for a Commander-in-Chief's XI against the touring West Indians, taking three wickets.

In 1961–62, bowling unchanged through each innings, he took 7 for 65 (his best innings figures) and 3 for 28 for Combined Services against Sargodha. A few days earlier he had taken 6 for 47 and 4 for 50 against Peshawar. In the second innings, he and Salahuddin bowled unchanged through an innings of 125.3 overs. Awan had match figures of 80.5–44–97–10. In the final of the Quaid-i-Azam Trophy against Karachi Blues, batting at number three in the second innings, he made his highest score, 32, the top score of the innings, but Karachi Blues won by four wickets. Awan played for a Combined XI against the touring MCC later in the season, taking two wickets in a match ruined by rain.

In 17 matches for Combined Services, he took 95 wickets at 15.50.

== Later career ==
The Combined Services team went into abeyance after 1964–65. After two matches for Sargodha in 1964-65 and 1965-66 Awan did not play again until the inaugural matches played by the Pakistan Air Force cricket team in 1969–70 when he was 40. He was their leading wicket-taker that season, with 10 wickets at 21.30, but the side lost all three of their matches. In 1970–71 he captained Pakistan Air Force to their only victory, over his old side Sargodha, taking match figures of 33–19–58–6.

He did not play in 1971–72, but he did stand as an umpire in two of Sargodha's matches. He returned to play in one last match in 1972–73, when at the age of 44 he opened the bowling for Pakistan Air Force and took 3 for 126 off 58 overs against Lahore B.

== See also ==
- Ray Chapman, an American baseball player killed after being struck by a ball during a game. The only player in Major League Baseball history to die of an in-game injury
- List of fatal accidents in cricket
