= Abdul Latif (cricketer) =

Bangladeshi cricketer and administrator (1939–2026)

Personal information
- Full name: Mohammad Abdul Latif Khan
- Born: 10 November 1939; Kamptee, Central Provinces and Berar, British India
- Died: 4 February 2026 (aged 86); Dhaka, Bangladesh
- Batting: Right-handed
- Bowling: Right-arm leg-spin

Domestic team information
- Years: Team
- 1956–57 to 1970–71: East Pakistan
- 1964–65 to 1965–66: Dacca

Career statistics
Competition	First-class
Matches	36
Runs scored	1596
Batting average	28.00
100s/50s	3/6
Top score	155*
Balls bowled	1947
Wickets	45
Bowling average	22.84
5 wickets in innings	4
10 wickets in match	2
Best bowling	7/19
Catches/stumpings	26/–
- Source: CricketArchive, 6 April 2014

Mohammad Abdul Latif (10 November 1939 – 4 February 2026), also known as Mohammad Abdul Latif Khan and M. A. Latif, was a first-class cricketer for East Pakistan, a senior officer in the Bangladesh armed services, and a cricket administrator.

== Playing career ==
A middle-order batsman and leg-spinner, Latif made his first-class debut for East Pakistan Greens in 1956–57. In his first five matches spread over four seasons, he made only 66 runs and took two wickets.

In 1961–62, he captained East Pakistan in the Quaid-e-Azam Trophy. Against Hyderabad he scored 109 and 49 and took 3 for 49 and 3 for 112 to play the leading part in East Pakistan's first victory in first-class cricket. Later that season, he played for a Combined XI against the touring MCC in Bahawalpur, and was the only local player selected for a match in Dacca between the East Pakistan Governor's XI and the touring International XI. However, he achieved little in either match.

Latif top-scored with 81 for a President's XI against the Commonwealth XI in 1963–64. Captaining Dacca in the Ayub Trophy in 1964–65 he scored 155 not out in a victory over Rajshahi.

When Ceylon toured Pakistan in 1966–67, Abdul Latif played for a President's XI against the tourists, making 42 not out in the second innings to enable his team to avoid defeat. He played for Pakistan in Dacca in the second of the three representative matches against Ceylon, scoring 21 and not bowling. Again, he was the only East Pakistan player in the side. For a President's XI against the MCC Under-25 side in Rawalpindi later that season, he scored 74 out of the first innings total of 157, playing "some exciting strokes".

From then on, Abdul Latif played only domestic cricket, despite a remarkable performance with the ball in two matches in January 1968. Captaining East Pakistan Greens against Dacca University in the Ayub Trophy, he took 7 for 19 and 5 for 40 in an innings victory, then a few days later against East Pakistan Railways he took 7 for 19 and 5 for 19 (as well as scoring 50) in another innings victory. His 24 wickets for 97 included 18 victims bowled. In the semi-final of the Ayub Trophy that followed immediately, however, he took only 1 for 75 in an innings loss.

He scored 143 and 42 and took two wickets when East Pakistan defeated Hyderabad Whites in 1969–70. After two matches in 1970–71, he played no further first-class cricket.

== Later career ==
Latif did his military training at the Pakistan Military Academy, and served in the Bangladesh military after Bangladesh achieved independence in 1971, rising to the rank of lieutenant colonel.

He managed the Bangladesh cricket team's tours to Australia and Pakistan in 2003, and to England and Sri Lanka in 2005. He was chairman of the Bangladesh Cricket Board's development committee from 2007 to 2008, and also served as vice-president of the Board.

In the 2010s, Latif served as the sports secretary for the Bangladesh National Party. He was also an international boxing referee.

== Death ==
Latif died in Dhaka on 4 February 2026, at the age of 86.
