= Shujauddin Butt =

Pakistani cricketer (1930–2006)

Shujauddin
Personal information
- Full name: Shujauddin Butt
- Born: 10 April 1930; Lahore, Punjab, British India
- Died: 7 February 2006 (aged 75); London, England
- Batting: Right-handed
- Bowling: Slow left-arm orthodox
- Role: All-rounder

International information
- National side: Pakistan (1954–1962)
- Test debut (cap 17): 10 June 1954 v England
- Last Test: 2 February 1962 v England

Domestic team information
- Years: Team
- 1947: Northern India
- 1947: Punjab
- 1948–1952: Punjab University
- 1953–1964: Combined Services
- 1958–1970: Bahawalpur
- 1966: Rawalpindi

Career statistics
Competition	Test	First-class
Matches	19	101
Runs scored	395	3,490
Batting average	15.19	25.28
100s/50s	0/0	6/14
Top score	47	147
Balls bowled	2,313	18,002
Wickets	20	319
Bowling average	38.14	21.91
5 wickets in innings	0	18
10 wickets in match	0	4
Best bowling	3/18	8/53
Catches/stumpings	8/–	69/–
- Source: ESPNcricinfo, 2 August 2021

Shujauddin Butt (10 April 1930 – 7 February 2006) was a Pakistani army officer and cricketer who played in 19 Tests from 1954 to 1962.

He served in the Pakistan Army for 26 years, retiring as a lieutenant colonel in 1978. In 1955 he toured India with the Pakistan national team. He was educated at Islamia College, Lahore. In 1971 he was captured during the 1971 Indo-Pakistan War and held as a prisoner-of-war in India for 18 months.

He managed Pakistan's tours to Australia and the West Indies in 1976–77. He wrote two books of Pakistan cricket history, From Babes of Cricket to World Champions (1996) and The Chequered History of Pakistan Cricket (2003), with Mohammed Salim Parvez.

Butt died in London on 7 February 2006.
