= Baseer Shamsi =

Pakistani soldier and cricketer (1922–2015)

Abdul Baseer Shamsi
Personal information
- Full name: Abdul Baseer Shamsi
- Born: 19 September 1922; Ferozepore, British India
- Died: 10 July 2015 (aged 92); Pakistan
- Batting: Right-handed
- Bowling: Left-arm medium-fast

Domestic team information
- Years: Team
- 1953–54 to 1960–61: Combined Services

Career statistics
Competition	First-class
Matches	13
Runs scored	233
Batting average	14.56
100s/50s	0/1
Top score	69
Balls bowled	2046
Wickets	42
Bowling average	19.47
5 wickets in innings	4
10 wickets in match	1
Best bowling	6/42
Catches/stumpings	5/–
- Source: CricketArchive, 21 October 2017

Brigadier (Brigadier General) Abdul Baseer Shamsi (19 September 1922 – 10 July 2015) was an officer in the Pakistan Army and a cricketer who played first-class cricket from 1953 to 1960.

He received his initial education in Firozpur and later moved to Jalandhar with his parents as his father Ali Mohammad Shamsi was appointed the head master of a school in Jalandhar.

During his college days in Jalandhar he excelled in the game of cricket as a medium fast left arm bowler, who moved the ball both ways in the air and off the seam, and a right-handed batsman. In Jalandhar, he played alongside Lall Singh, Lala Amarnath, his lifelong friend, Baqa Jilani and Dr. Jehangir Khan (father of Majid Khan) who was his mentor throughout his life.

== Military career ==
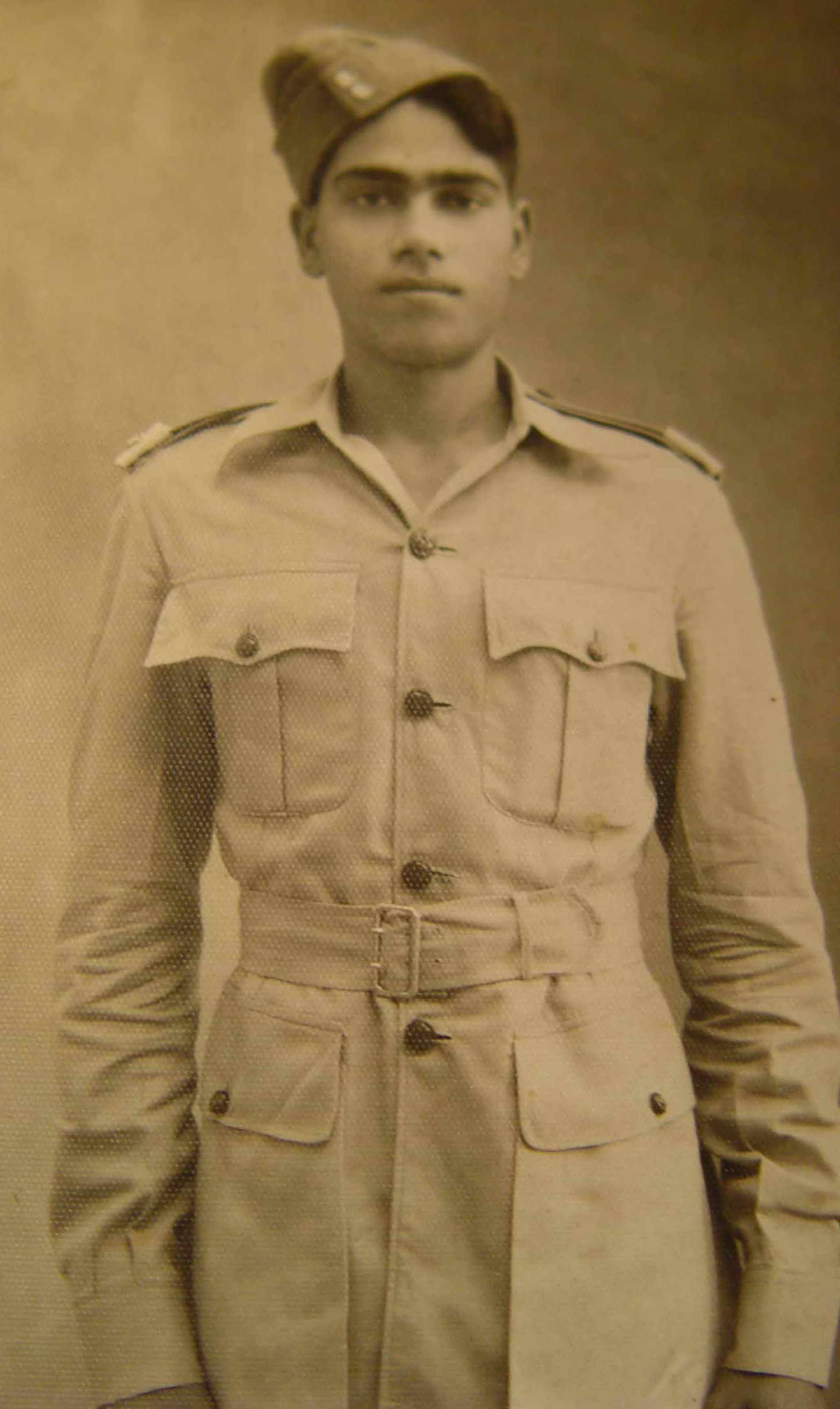
Officer Cadet 1939

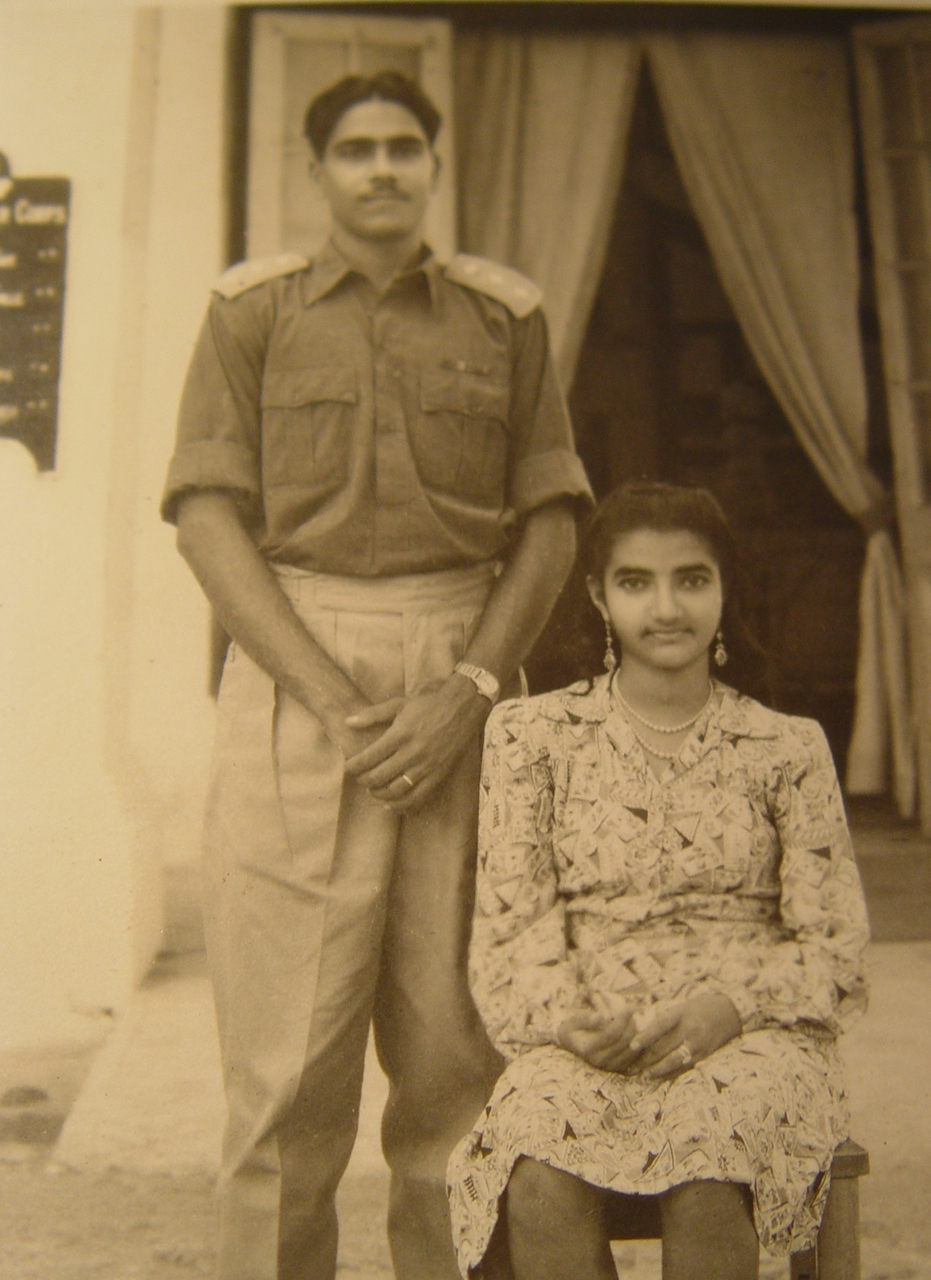
Captain A.B. Shamsi with wife Neelum Shamsi. Kuala Lumpur 1946

At the age of 18, he applied for and was selected for commission in the British Indian Army. In 1939 after training as an Officer Cadet, he was granted commission in the distinguished 2nd Battalion of the 8th Punjab Regiment (present day 2nd Battalion the Baloch Regiment, Pakistan Army).

In January 1942, the Japanese army attacked Burma (now Myanmar) with the aim of cutting through the Burma jungle, build the Burma Railway and launch an attack on the subcontinent of India. In the same month a hurriedly assembled army comprising forces of British army and British Indian army were sent to Burma to somehow halt the Japanese advance in Burma.

A.B. Shamsi saw active service fighting against the Japanese army throughout the Burma campaign and took part in the major battles of Imphal, Kohima and Irrawaddy. For his service during the Burma campaign he was awarded the Burma Star, 1935-1945 Star and the War Medal.

In September 1945, A.B. Shamsi, then a captain, was posted as staff officer to Lt. Gen. Philip Christison, General Officer Commanding British forces in Malaya. In Kuala Lumpur, he met Lall Singh and within a year he married Lall Singh's niece Ajmer Kaur, who had converted to Islam and taken the name of Neelum.

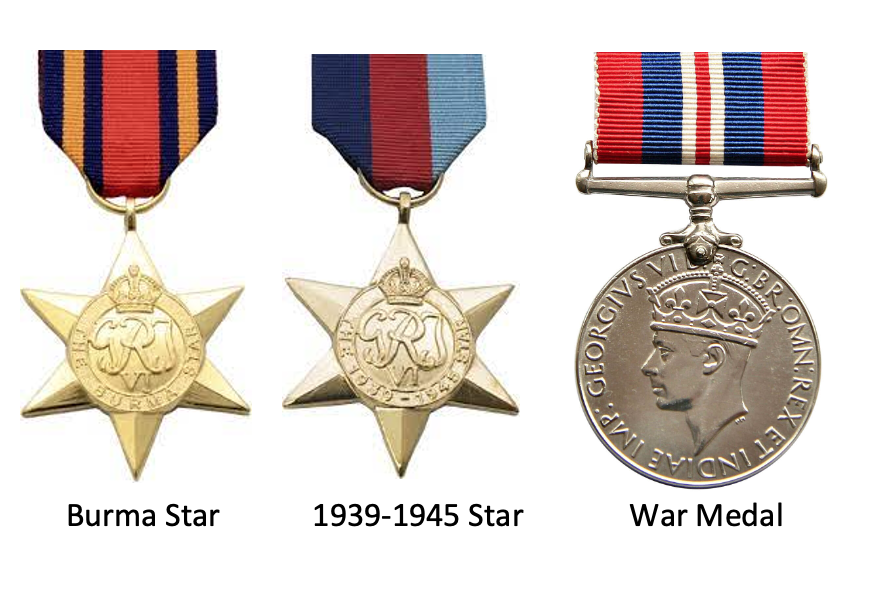
Medals Awarded During WWII

He returned to India with his wife in early 1947 and was posted to 2nd Battalion of 8th Punjab Regiment which was then posted in what was to become Pakistan on 14 August 1947. He graduated from the Pakistan Command and Staff College Quetta in 1954. During the year long course, he was called up to tour England with the Pakistan cricket team on its first ever tour of England but refused to go giving preference to his career.

In early 1957 he was Brigade Major (BM) of 114 Brigade Lahore when he was chosen by the army to attend the Advanced Tactical Course at the prestigious US Army School of Infantry, Fort Benning, Georgia. On return from the year long course, he was promoted Lieutenant Colonel and given command of 18th Battalion of the Baloch Regiment. In 1960 he was transferred to Military training directorate at the General Headquarters. From 1962 to 1964 he commanded an infantry Battalion in Kashmir. In 1964 he was given command of 2nd Battalion the Baloch Regiment (former 2nd Battalion of the 8th Punjab Regiment).

During the September 1965 war with India, his battalion had been deployed on the Jammu–Sialkot Road with the aim of denying the enemy access to Sialkot through this road. The enemy carried out many attacks on the battalion but were unable to make any headway. Finally, having made no break through with its infantry attacks, on 19 September 1965 the enemy attacked his position with a squadron (14) of tanks. Without any armour support his infantry battalion managed to destroy 9 Indian tanks, 6 of which he was able to retrieve and bring back to Pakistan. For his gallantry he was awarded the Imtiazi Sanad.

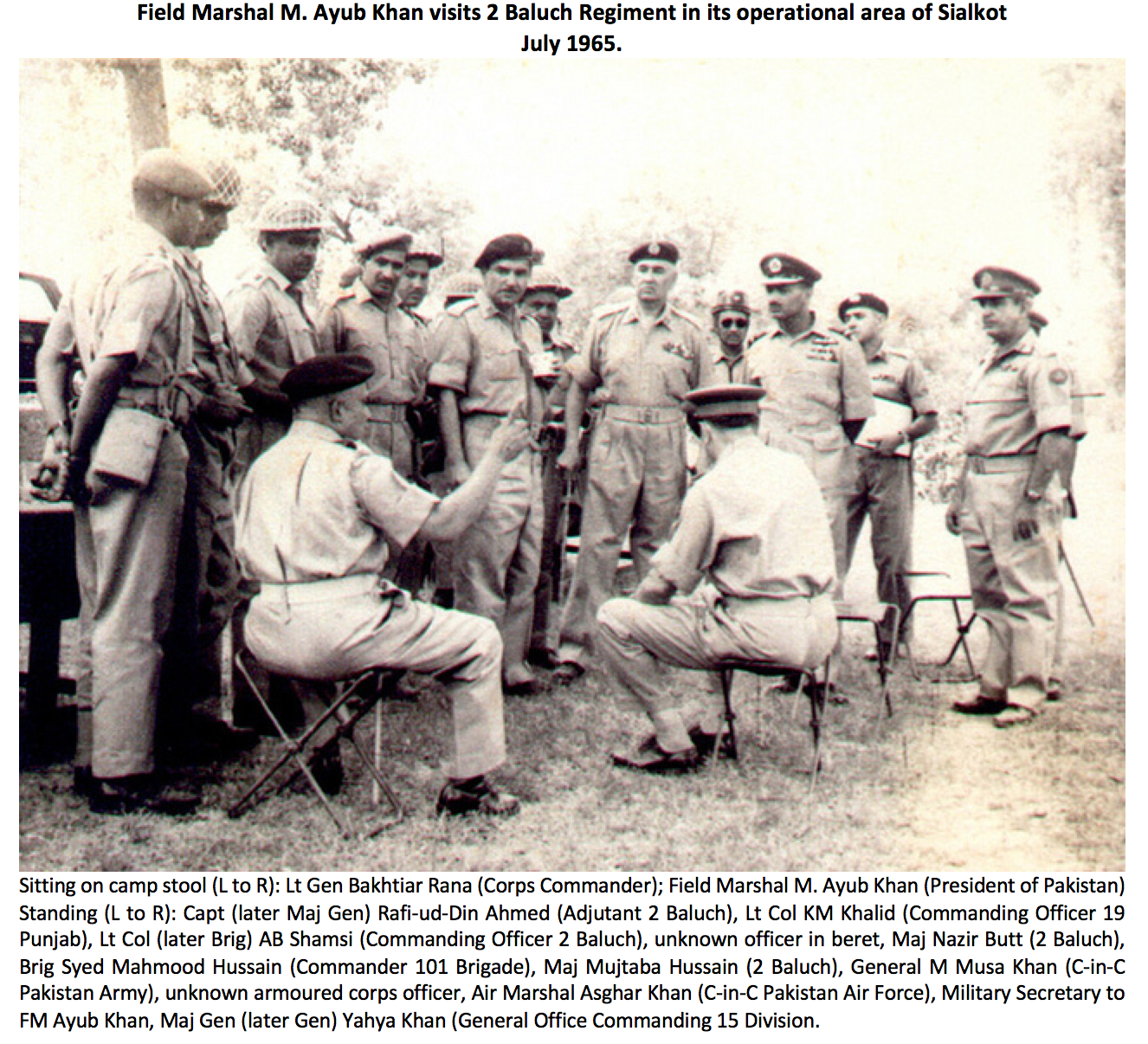

He was promoted to the rank of brigadier (brigadier general) and commanded two infantry brigades. His final command was as officiating General Office Commanding of 12 Division in Kashmir. He retired from the army in 1970 at the age of 48, having severed the army for 31 years.

== Cricket career ==
Shamsi was a left-arm opening bowler who played for the Combined Services in Pakistan. He made his first-class debut in the first season of the Quaid-e-Azam Trophy in December 1953, and took part in Combined Services’ tour of Ceylon in December 1953 and January 1954. In the only first-class match of the tour he took 5 for 55 and 6 for 42 in the victory over the Ceylon Cricket Association in Colombo.

He was selected to play for The Rest against Pakistan in 1954-55 and made his highest score, 69, in the first innings, which was also The Rest's top score for the match; he was also The Rest's most successful bowler, with 3 for 67 in the first innings. In a semi-final of the Quaid-e-Azam Trophy in 1956-57 he took 6 for 73 against Punjab, who nevertheless won by an innings. In his last first-class match he captained Combined Services in the inaugural season of the Ayub Trophy in 1960–61, taking 5 for 29 in the first innings against a combined Rawalpindi and Peshawar team.
