= Lahore Education Board cricket team =

Cricket team of students from Lahore

Lahore Education Board was a cricket team of students from Lahore that played first-class cricket in the Ayub Trophy in the 1960–61 and 1964–65 seasons in Pakistan.

They played one drawn match in 1960–61 against Lahore. In 1964–65, captained by Younis Ahmed, they won their first five matches outright or on the first innings, but lost the final to Karachi by an innings and 91 runs. Their main bowler was Tariq Cheema, who took 34 wickets at an average of 15.85. His opening partner Majid Khan took 27 wickets at 16.77 and made 343 runs at 42.87.

Later in the 1964–65 season Lahore Education Board combined with Punjab University to compete in the Quaid-e-Azam Trophy under the name "Punjab University and Lahore Education Board". They played two matches, both of which were drawn.
