= Naushad Ali (cricketer) =

Pakistani Army officer and cricketer (1943–2023)

Personal information
- Full name: Syed Naushad Ali Rizvi
- Born: 1 October 1943; Gwalior, Gwalior State, British India
- Died: 20 August 2023 (aged 79); Islamabad, Pakistan
- Batting: Right-handed
- Role: Wicket-keeper, Referee
- Relatives: Maryam Faisal (grand daughter)

International information
- National side: Pakistan
- Test debut (cap 50): 22 January 1965 v New Zealand
- Last Test: 9 April 1965 v New Zealand

Career statistics
Competition	Test	First-class
Matches	6	83
Runs scored	156	4,322
Batting average	14.18	36.31
100s/50s	0/0	9/20
Top score	39	158
Catches/stumpings	9/–	141/34
- Source: Cricinfo, 10 January 2017

Naushad Ali Rizvi (Urdu: نوشاد علی; 1 October 1943 – 20 August 2023) was a Pakistani Army officer and international cricketer. He was a colonel in the Pakistan Army.

Ali played in six Tests in 1965 as Pakistan's wicket-keeper and opening batsman. He played first-class cricket in Pakistan from 1960 to 1979, scoring nine centuries. He was also a match referee and administrator.

== Biography ==
Syed Naushad Ali Rizvi, born on October 1, 1943, in Gwalior, British India, migrated to Karachi, Pakistan, in 1949. He grew up in Nazimabad, Karachi, where he developed a passion for cricket.

Rizvi represented Model High School and Sind Muslim College in Karachi before entering first-class cricket with Karachi University in the 1960-61 Ayub Trophy. In 1961–62, he joined the Karachi Blues squad for the Quaid-e-Azam (QA) Trophy, contributing to their national championship victory.

In 1962, Rizvi attended a six-week residential summer camp for university cricketers, organized by the Pakistan Sports Board at the National Stadium, Karachi. He played for Pak Wanderers and Clifton Gymkhana in Karachi club cricket.

During the 1962-63 QA Trophy, Rizvi scored 99 against Lahore A and a maiden first-class century (158) against Railways. He toured England with the Pakistan Eaglets in 1963. He was part of the Karachi s team that won the 1963-64 QA Trophy, scoring 83 in the final.

Rizvi made his Test debut during Pakistan's 1964-65 tour of Australia and New Zealand, playing as a wicketkeeper and opening batsman. His international career ended after the home series against New Zealand in 1965.

In the late 1960s, Rizvi joined the Pakistan Army, which limited his cricketing opportunities. He continued to play domestic cricket, representing East Pakistan, President's XI, and Karachi Blues. Notable performances included carrying his bat for 107* against Railways and scoring 140 against a touring Commonwealth team.

Rizvi's partnership with Sadiq Mohammad in the 1970-71 QA Trophy final helped Karachi Blues secure the title. He toured England with the Pakistan team in 1971 as an understudy to Wasim Bari.

In the latter part of his career, Rizvi played for Peshawar, NWFP, Karachi Whites, Punjab, and Combined Services. He retired from first-class cricket in 1978–79.

Post-retirement, Rizvi served on the National Selection Committee and as a team manager for the Pakistan national cricket team. He was appointed manager for tours to Australia and New Zealand, and for the Commonwealth Games in Malaysia. He held various roles in the Pakistan Cricket Board (PCB), including Chairman of the National Selection Committee, Director of Operations, and ICC Match Referee.

Rizvi retired from the Pakistan Army as a colonel and was based in Islamabad. He contributed to regional cricket development and worked on stadium upgrades and suspect bowling actions for the PCB.

He died on 20 August 2023, aged 79. Rizvi is survived by his second wife, and his children from his first marriage.
