= Central Zone cricket team (Pakistan) =

Cricket team

Pakistan's Central Zone was an occasional first-class cricket team based in Bahawalpur and Sahiwal which played a total of six matches, mostly against touring teams, between 1955 and 1969.
