= Public Works Department cricket team =

Cricket team

The Public Works Department (PWD) cricket team competed at first-class level in cricket competitions in Pakistan from 1964 to 2003. They were sponsored by the Pakistan Public Works Department.

== Playing record ==
PWD competed in the Ayub Trophy and the Quaid-i-Azam Trophy between 1964–65 and 1970–71, and the Patron's Trophy from 1971–72 to 1978–79. They returned for one season in 1986–87, then for two seasons in 2001–02 and 2002–03. Of their 64 first-class matches, they won 17, lost 15, and drew 32.

PWD were competitive from the start, reaching the semi-finals of the Ayub Trophy in their first season. Their most successful season was 1969–70, when they won four of their first five matches by large margins to reach the final of the Quaid-i-Azam Trophy, but then lost to the powerful Pakistan International Airlines side that consisted entirely of Test players.

When PWD returned to first-class level after a break they were less successful, winning only two out of 16 matches in the three seasons.

They did not have a permanent home ground.

== Notable performances ==
The highest total for PWD was 714, made in an innings victory over Quetta in 1969–70. Rashid Israr made their highest individual score of 211 not out against Hyderabad in 1973–74. Their best bowling figures were 8 for 41 by Saeed Ahmed against Kalat in 1969–70 (he took 12 for 61 in the match).

Apart from Saeed Ahmed, PWD's Test players included Intikhab Alam, Aftab Baloch, Niaz Ahmed and Shahid Mahmood, who was their first captain.
