= Combined Services (Pakistan) cricket team =

Cricket team

Combined Services (Pakistan) cricket team were a first-class cricket team for members of the Pakistan Armed Forces. They competed in Pakistan's first-class tournaments between 1953–54 and 1978–79.

== 1953–54 to 1964–65 ==
Combined Services were one of the seven teams that competed in the first season of the Quaid-i-Azam Trophy in 1953–54. They dominated their first match, against Karachi, Mohammed Ghazali scoring 160. In their second match their total of 405 was not enough to secure a first-innings lead against Bahawalpur, who proceeded to the finals and won the trophy. Combined Services then made a short tour of India and Ceylon, where they won the only first-class match, against the Ceylon Cricket Association.

They played a match against the touring Indians in 1954–55, losing by an innings. They were more successful in that season's Quaid-i-Azam Trophy, reaching the final, where they lost by nine wickets to Karachi, for whom the Mohammad brothers Wazir, Hanif and Raees, all scored centuries. They drew a match against the touring MCC in 1955–56, Shujauddin making 147 and taking 6 for 71.

Combined Services easily won their first two matches in 1956–57, against East Pakistan Greens and East Pakistan Whites in Dacca. When they dismissed East Pakistan Whites for 33, Miran Bux took 6 for 15. They were in turn beaten by an innings by Punjab, Fazal Mahmood taking 6 for 33 and 9 for 43 and top-scoring with 91.

In 1958–59, with one victory and two first-innings leads in drawn matches, they again reached the final of the Quaid-i-Azam Trophy. Once again they lost to Karachi, this time by 279 runs, Hanif Mohammad scoring another century. They also reached the semi-finals in 1959–60. They played in the inaugural Ayub Trophy tournament in 1960–61, when there was no Quaid-i-Azam Trophy tournament, losing their only match.

When the Quaid-i-Azam Trophy returned in 1961-62 it was in a group format rather than a knock-out format. In their first match, Combined Services lost to Rawalpindi in a low-scoring match despite the efforts of Shujauddin, who took 4 for 31 and 6 for 69 and made 68 (Combined Services' top score) and 31 (second-top score). But they won their next four matches and reached the final again. Batting first against Karachi Blues, Imtiaz Ahmed and Shujauddin put on 269 for the first wicket, Imtiaz going on to score 251. After taking a first-innings lead Combined Services were dismissed for 143, and Karachi Blues were able to score the 217 required for victory for the loss of six wickets. It was Combined Services' third and last appearance in a final. Shujauddin was the most successful bowler in the Quaid-i-Azam Trophy in 1961–62, taking 48 wickets at an average of 11.14. He took 4 for 8 and 8 for 53 against Lahore A.

Combined Services won two matches and lost one in 1962–63. In the victory over Peshawar, Munir Malik took 7 for 39 and 4 for 39, as well as making the second-highest score of 32 in the first innings. They drew their only match in 1963–64, then won one and lost one in 1964–65, when Nayyar Hussain took 5 for 25 and 6 for 61 and top-scored in each innings with 57 and 28 in a four-wicket victory over Sargodha, then took 7 for 55 and 1 for 63 and top-scored with 58 and then second-top-scored with 46 in a three-wicket loss to Lahore Education Board.

== 1976–77 to 1978–79 ==
Between December 1964 and February 1977 Combined Services played no first-class cricket. They returned in the 1976–77 season, captained by Nayyar Hussain at the age of 41, to play in the BCCP Patron's Trophy. They played four times in the next three seasons, winning once, losing twice and drawing once. They also played in the BCCP Invitation Tournament in 1978–79, losing their only match.

== Playing record ==
Combined Services played 33 matches in various first-class tournaments, winning 14, losing 11 and drawing 8. They played three other first-class matches, winning 1, losing 1 and drawing 1. They also played a match in India in 1954–55 in a combined team with Bahawalpur, losing to Bombay.

== Notable players ==
Imtiaz Ahmed played 41 Tests for Pakistan in the 1950s and early 1960s. He played 26 matches for Combined Services, captaining the team in most of these matches, and scored 1,864 runs at an average of 43.34. In the same period Shujauddin played 19 Tests for Pakistan, and 27 matches for Combined Services, for whom he scored 1,407 runs at 30.58 and took 122 wickets at 15.44.

Other Combined Services players who played Test cricket in the 1950s and early 1960s included Abdul Hafeez Kardar (the first captain of both the Pakistan Test team and Combined Services), Waqar Hasan, Mohammed Ghazali, Miran Bux and Munir Malik. The only Combined Services player from the 1970s who played Test cricket was Naushad Ali.

== Other sources ==
- Wisden Cricketers' Almanack 1955 to 1980
