= East Pakistan first-class cricket teams =

Cricket teams

Between the 1954–55 and 1970–71 seasons, 13 first-class cricket teams from East Pakistan played in the Pakistan domestic cricket competitions, the Quaid-e-Azam Trophy and the Ayub Trophy. With the creation of Bangladesh in 1971, this participation ended. An East Pakistan Governor's XI also played a first-class match against the touring International XI in 1961–62.

== List of teams ==
Team name	First season	Seasons	Played	Won	Lost	Drawn
East Pakistan	1954–55	9	16	6	5	5
East Pakistan Greens	1956–57	3	6	3	0	3
East Pakistan Whites	1956–57	3	5	0	3	2
East Pakistan A	1957–58	1	2	1	0	1
East Pakistan B	1957–58	1	2	0	0	2
Dacca University	1957–58	4	7	2	1	4
Dacca University and Education Board	1964–65	1	2	1	1	0
East Zone	1961–62	1	1	0	0	1
Dacca	1964–65	2	6	2	3	1
Chittagong	1964–65	1	1	0	0	1
Rajshahi	1964–65	1	1	0	0	1
Khulna	1964–65	1	1	0	1	0
East Pakistan Railways	1967–68	1	2	0	1	1

NB: Team names are as they appear on CricketArchive scorecards. Some names differ in Wisden, such as "East Pakistan C.A." and "East Pakistan Sports Federation", both of which CricketArchive calls simply East Pakistan.

The only one of these teams to defeat sides from West Pakistan was East Pakistan, which defeated Hyderabad four times, Khairpur once, and a combined Hyderabad-Khairpur-Quetta team once.

East Pakistan also played first-class matches against the touring Indians in 1954–55 and the MCC in 1955–56. The touring team won on each occasion.

== Leading players ==
The only East Pakistan player to be selected in the Pakistan Test team was Niaz Ahmed. Several Test players from West Pakistan played for East Pakistan teams, however; when East Pakistan defeated Hyderabad-Khairpur-Quetta in 1966–67, the losing team protested that six of the East Pakistan team were actually from West Pakistan and should have been ineligible.

Abdul Latif, who captained East Pakistan teams in several matches, was a prominent player in the 1960s. He scored three centuries, and took 24 wickets for 97 with his leg-spin in two consecutive matches for East Pakistan Greens in January 1968. Shamim Kabir, who played 15 first-class matches for various East Pakistan teams, later captained Bangladesh in their first match, against the touring MCC in January 1977. Javed Masood hit the highest score for an East Pakistan team when he scored 215 in the victory over Hyderabad in 1962–63.

According to Shaharyar Khan, Niaz Ahmed was used for political purposes, to disguise Pakistan's neglect of cricket in East Pakistan: "There was a club-level cricketer from Dhaka called Niaz Ahmed who was Pakistan's perennial 12th man for quite some time, the Pakistan Cricket Board attempting to give the entirely unconvincing impression that East Pakistan was on the verge of national representation. The fact was that no effort was made by the governments of Pakistan or by the cricket boards to promote cricket in East Pakistan."

== Grounds ==
Most first-class matches in East Pakistan were played at Dacca Stadium. Pakistan also played seven Tests at the stadium between 1955 and 1969.

== See also ==
- History of cricket in Pakistan from 1947 to 1970
- Cricket in Bangladesh
- Cricket in Pakistan
- Pakistan national cricket team
- Bangladesh Cricket Board
- Pakistan Cricket Board
- Sport in Bangladesh
- Sport in Pakistan
