= Persian language in the Indian subcontinent =

Indian Persian
- فارسیِ ھندی
- Pronunciation: [fɑːɾˈsiː e hɪndi]
- Region: Indian subcontinent
- Language family: Indo-European: Indo-Iranian; Iranian; Western; Southwestern; Persian; Indian Persian
- Early forms: Old Persian: Middle Persian; Early New Persian; Classical Persian
- Dialects: Bengal †; Deccan †; North Indian †; Kashmir †; Punjab †
- Writing system: Persian alphabet

Language codes
- ISO 639-3: –
- IETF: fa-034

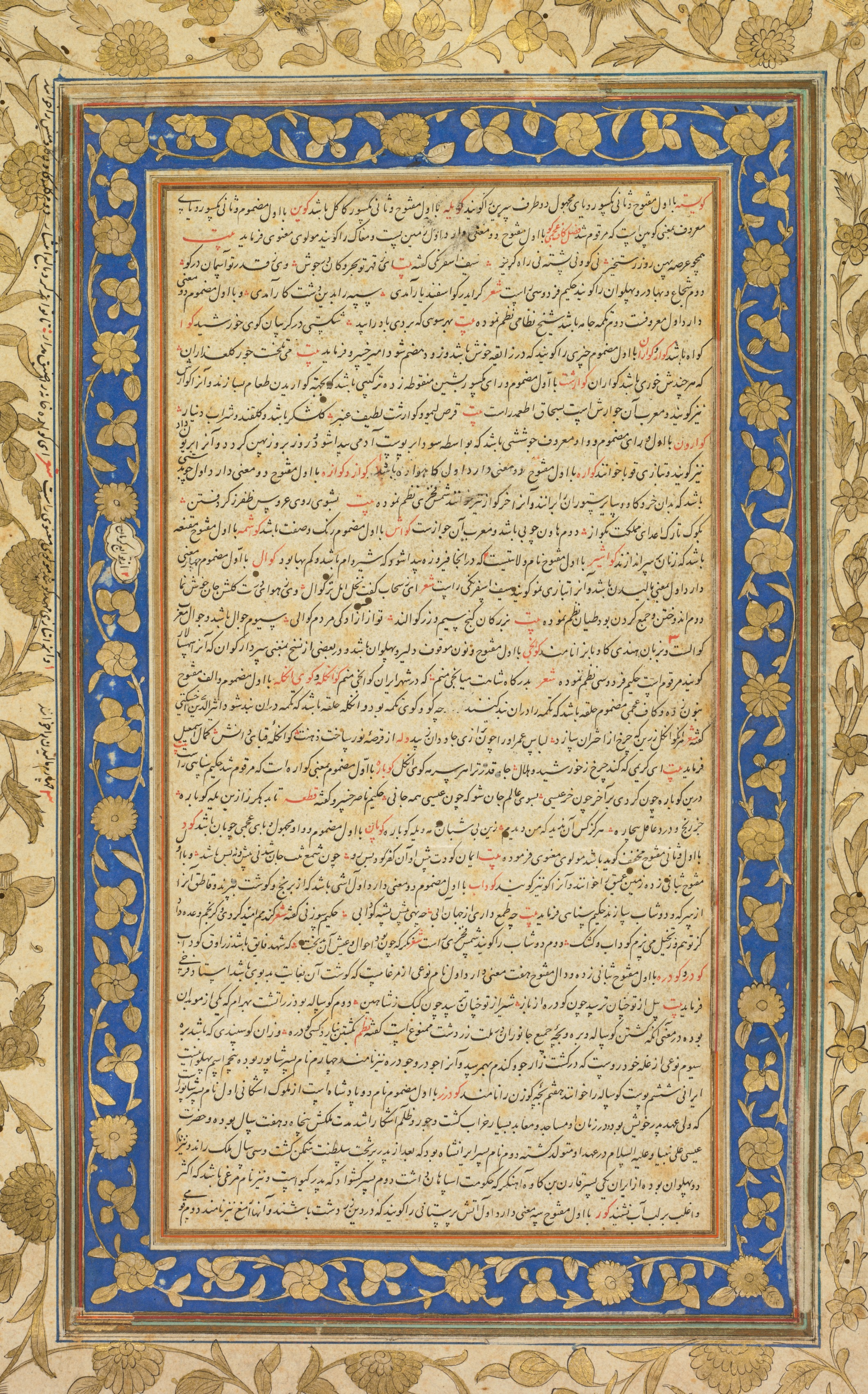
A page from the Farhang-i Jahangiri, a monumental dictionary compiled under Mughal emperors Akbar and Jahangir. Between the 10th and 19th centuries, Indian lexicography output literally and consistently dwarfed even that of Iran.

Indian Persian, or Indo-Persian, was the historical variety of Persian used as an official language of administration across much of the Indian subcontinent. (Note: This article uses the terms 'India' and 'Indian' in a historical sense to refer to the Indian subcontinent; this is not to be confused with the modern-day country of India and its citizens.) It has no surviving indigenous native-speaking community today. The language was brought into South Asia by various Turco-Persianate and Afghan empires and was preserved and patronized by local Indian dynasties from the 11th century, such as the Sayyid dynasty, Tughlaq dynasty, Khalji dynasty, Mughal dynasty, Gujarat sultanate, Bengal sultanate, Bahmani sultanate, and the Deccan sultanates. Initially it was used by Muslim dynasties of India but later started being used by non-Muslim empires too. For example, the Sikh Empire, Persian held official status in the court and the administration within these empires. It largely replaced Sanskrit as the language of politics, literature, education, and social status in the northern part of the Indian subcontinent.

The spread of Persian closely followed the political and religious growth of Islam in the Indian subcontinent. However, Persian historically played the role of an overarching, often non-sectarian language connecting the diverse people of the region. It also helped construct a Persian identity, incorporating the Indian subcontinent into the transnational world of Greater Iran, or Ajam. Persian's historical role and functions in the subcontinent have caused the language to be compared to English in the modern-day region.

Persian began to decline with the gradual deterioration of the Mughal Empire. Even though Hindustani and Marathi were the official languages of the Maratha Empire, Persian was still used in the Maratha court (durbar) and was highly patronized by the Maratha emperors such as Chhatrapati Shahu and Rajaram II. Persian lost its official status in the Company Raj in 1837, and fell out of currency in the subsequent British Raj, being replaced by Hindustani and English.

Persian's linguistic legacy in the region is apparent through its impact on the Indo-Aryan languages. It played a formative role in the emergence of Hindustani, and had a relatively strong influence on Punjabi, Tamil, Sindhi, Bengali, Gujarati, and Kashmiri. Other languages like Marathi, Rajasthani, and Odia also have a considerable amount of loan words from Persian. Besides Tamil, other Dravidian languages such as Brahui, Telugu, Kannada and Malayalam (through Tamil) also contain significant Persian influence.

== Background ==
Persian's arrival in the Indian subcontinent was the result of a larger trend in Greater Iran. In the aftermath of the Muslim conquest of Persia, new Iranian-Islamic empires emerged, reviving Persian culture in a new Islamic context. This period is sometimes termed the Iranian Intermezzo, spanning the 9th to 10th centuries, and reestablished in the Persian language the refinement and prestige that Arabic had laid claim to. In the process, Persian adopted Arabic script and incorporated many Arabic words into its vocabulary, evolving into a new form known as New Persian. These developments were centred in the regions of Khorasan and Transoxiana.

The empires employed Turkic slave warriors in their military, which exposed them to a Persianate culture. These warriors were able to rise up the ranks and gain political power; they began the synthesis of a Turco-Persian tradition, wherein Turkic rulers patronised the Persian language and culture.

The resulting Turkic dynasties, such as the Seljuks and Ghaznavids, expanded outwards in search of new opportunities. Immediately adjacent to the lands of the Persians and Turks, the Indian subcontinent became a target for the Ghaznavid Empire, and New Persian (also referred to as Classical Persian) was carried along with them. This set a precedent for Persian's further growth in the subcontinent. The Turkic and Mongol dynasties that subsequently arrived in South Asia emulated this Persianised high culture since it had become the predominant courtly culture in Western and Central Asia. Similar developments in other regions of Asia led to the establishment of Persian as literary and official language in a region stretching from "China to the Balkans, and from Siberia to southern India", by the 15th century. The arrival of Persian in the Indian subcontinent was hence no isolated event, and eventually positioned the region within a much larger Persian-speaking world.

== History ==
=== Arrival and Growth ===
The Ghaznavid conquests of the 11th century introduced Persian to the Indian subcontinent. As Mahmud of Ghazni established a power base in India, the centre of Persian literary patronage shifted from Ghazna to the Punjab alias Hind or the land east on the river Indus, especially at the empire's second capital Lahore. This began a steady influx of Persian-speaking soldiers, settlers and literati from Iran, Khorasan, and other places of the Persianate world. This flow would stay largely uninterrupted for the next few centuries. Notable Persian poets of this early period include Abu-al-Faraj Runi and Masud Sa'd Salman, both born in the Indian subcontinent. The Ghurids expanded this territory, shifting Perso-Islamic influence further into the subcontinent and claiming Delhi.

Virtually every Islamic power thereafter followed the Ghaznavids' practice of using Persian as a courtly language. Delhi became a major centre of Persian literary culture in Hindustan from the 13th century onwards, with the establishment of the Delhi Sultanate by the post-Ghurid Mamluks. The successive Khiljis and Tughluqs sponsored many pieces of literature in the language; poet Amir Khusrow produced much of his Persian work under their patronage. Between the 13th and 15th centuries, the Turkic rulers of the Delhi Sultanate encouraged the flow of eminent Persian-speaking personalities (such as poets, scribes, and holy people) into the subcontinent, granting them land to settle in rural areas. This flow was increased by the Mongol conquests of the Perso-Islamic world, as many Persian elite sought refuge in North India. Hence the Persian language established itself in court and literature, but also through a sizeable population often associated with Islamic nobility. The Delhi Sultanate was largely the impetus for the spread of Persian, since its borders stretched deep into the subcontinent. In the wake of its gradual disintegration, the various outgrowths of the empire in regions as far as the Deccan and Bengal resultantly adopted Persian.

Apart from courtly influence, Persian also spread through religion, particularly the Islamic faith of Sufism. Many Sufi missionaries to the subcontinent had Persian roots, and although they used local Indo-Aryan languages to reach their followers, they used Persian to converse amongst each other and write literature. This resulted in a diffusion process among the local followers of the faith. Sufi centres (Khanqah) served as focal points for this cultural interaction. Sufism also interacted with Hinduism through the Bhakti movement; Abidi and Gargesh speculate that this could have further introduced Persian to locals.

The language had a brief dormant period in the late 15th to early 16th century after the Delhi Sultanate was sacked by Timur. Afghan dynasties such as the Suris and Lodis gained control in the north of the subcontinent, and although Afghans at the time were a part of the Persianate world, these rulers were not well-acquainted with the language. In this era, empires all over the subcontinent began to employ Hindustani's emerging predecessor Hindavi (also known as Dehlavi or Deccani) as a language of the court. Work in Persian was however still produced, and Persian still featured in official documents. Notably, the Delhi Sultanate's official language was declared Persian by Sikandar Lodi, which began a diffusion process outside Islamic nobility; Hindus for the first time began to learn the language for purposes of employment, and there is evidence of them even teaching the language in this period.

=== Height ===
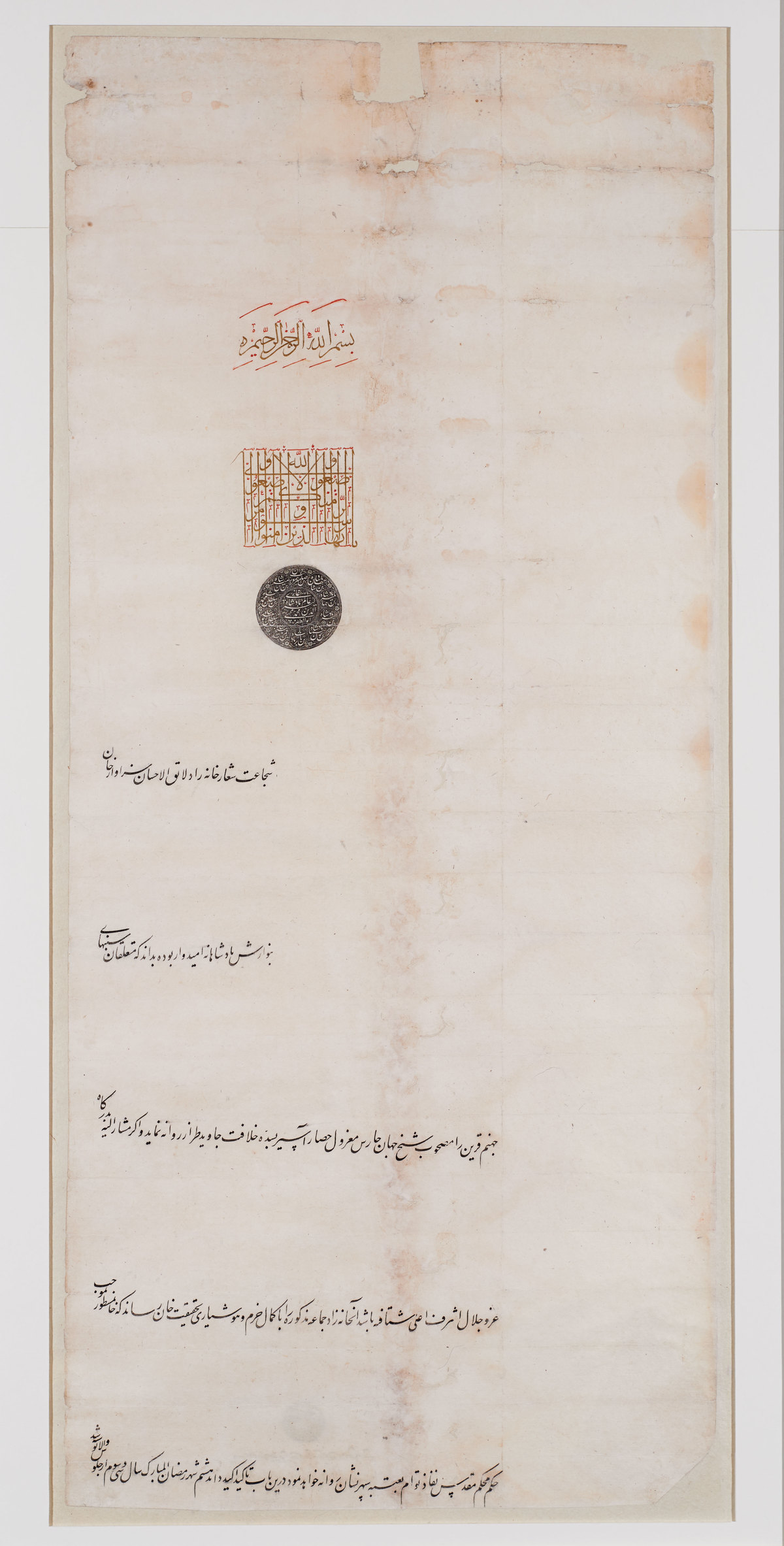
A firman issued under Mughal Emperor Aurangzeb, written in Persian. Hindus employed in the Mughal finance department were known to excel at writing these documents, which were used as exemplars in educational institutions.

Persian experienced a revival with the advent of the Mughal emperors (1526–1857), under whom the language reached its zenith in the Indian subcontinent. The Mughals were of Timurid origin; they were Turco-Mongols, and had been Persianised to an extent. However, the early Mughal court preferred their ancestral Turkic language. This linguistic situation began to change when the second Mughal Emperor Humayun reconquered India with the aid of Safavid Iran, ushering many Iranians into the subcontinent. His successor Akbar developed these ties by granting these Iranians positions in the imperial service. He also undertook generous efforts to attract many Persian literati from Iran. Akbar's actions established Persian as the language of the Mughal court, transitioning the royal family out of the ancestral language (his own son and successor Jahangir, for example, was more proficient in Persian than Turkic). Under Akbar, Persian was made the official language of the Mughal Empire, a policy it would retain till its demise. His pluralist rule resulted in many natives becoming more open to learning the language, and educational reforms were introduced in madrasas to improve Persian learning. The Mughal association with the Persian language continued with Akbar's successors; the literary environment created under them led Sa'ib Tabrezi, a Shah Jahan-era poet at the Mughal court, to comment:

nēst dar Ērān-zamīn sāmān-i taḥsīl-i kamāl
tā niyāmad sōy-i Hindūstān ḥinā rangēn našud

Translation:

There is not in the Persian land the requisite material for the perfection of art,
Until henna came to India, it acquired no colour.

Under the Mughals, Persian took prominence as the language of culture, education, and prestige. Their policies resulted in a process of Persianization by which many Indian communities increasingly adopted the language for social purposes. Professions requiring Persian proficiency, previously occupied by Iranians and Turks, came to be shared with Indians. For example, groups such as the Kashmiri Pandits, Kayasthas and Khatris came to dominate the Mughal finance departments; Indians taught Persian in madrasas alongside masters of the language from Iran. Moreover, the complete Persianisation of the Mughal administrative system meant that the language reached both urban centres as well as villages, and a larger audience for Persian literature developed.

In this way, Persian became a second language to many across North India; Muzaffar Alam contends that it neared the status of a first language. By the 18th century, many Indians in the north of the subcontinent had a "native speaker's competence in Persian".

=== Decline ===
Following Aurangzeb's death, Persian began to fall into decline, being displaced by Urdu in the Mughal court. The arrival and strengthening of British political power added a growing influence of English as well. However, for a long time Persian was still the dominant language of the subcontinent, used in education, Muslim rule, the judiciary, and literature. While the East India Company used English in the higher levels of administration, it acknowledged the importance of Persian as a "language of command", and used it as the language of provincial governments and courts. Hence many British officials arriving in India learned Persian in colleges established by the Company. The teachers in these colleges were often Indian. In some cases, Britishers even took over as Persian professors, sidelining the role of the Indians.

Through the early 1800s, though the East India Company continued to use Persian and Hindustani officially, it increasingly began to favour vernacular languages over Persian in the administration and adjudication of the Indian population. This was due to the fact that Persian was no longer as widely understood in India. By the 1830s, the Company came to view Persian as an "impediment to good governance", culminating in a series of reforms; the Madras and Bombay Presidencies dropped Persian from their administration in 1832, and in 1837, Act No. 29 mandated the abandonment of Persian in official proceedings throughout India in favour of vernacular languages. English eventually replaced Persian in education as well, and the British actively promoted Hindustani as the means of common communication. Additionally, nationalistic movements in the subcontinent led to various communities embracing vernacular languages over Persian. Still, Persian was not fully supplanted, and remained the language of "intercultural communication". Famed poet Mirza Ghalib lived during this transitional era, and produced many works in the language. As late as the 1930s, Persian was still a favoured college degree for Hindu students, despite the consolidation of English-medium education. Muhammad Iqbal's prolific Persian work, produced during the turn of the 20th century, is considered the last great instance of the Indo-Persian tradition.

Nile Green asserts that the advent of printing technology in 19th-century British India also played a part in Persian's decline. While the printing press enabled the highest Persian textual output in the subcontinent's history, it also greatly amplified more widely spoken languages such as Hindustani and Bengali, exacerbating the shift towards vernacular languages in the region.

== Regional use ==
This section gives a closer look at the use of Persian in selected regions, specifically those outside Central-Northern India, which was often the centre of Islamic power in the Indian subcontinent.

=== Punjab ===
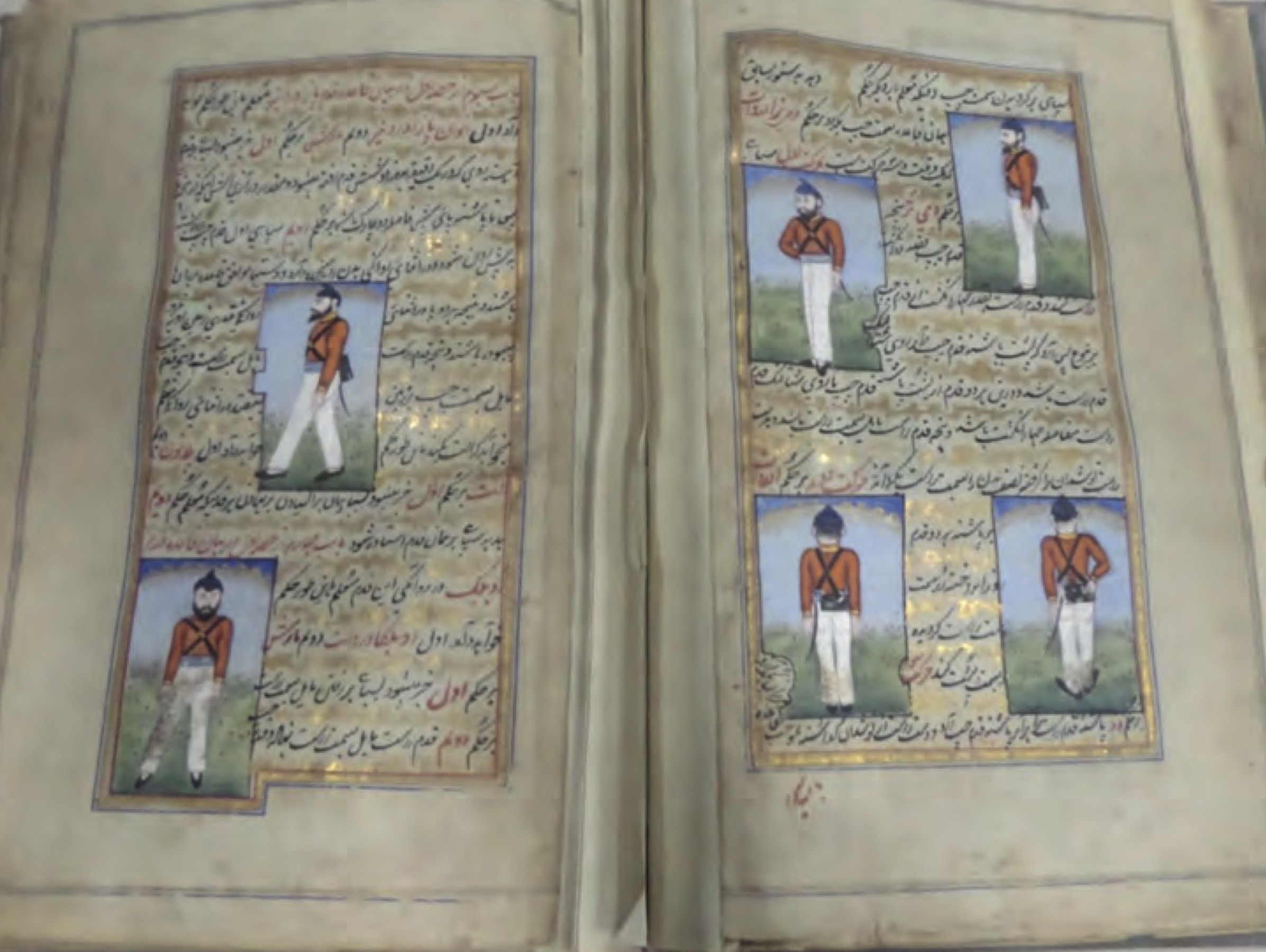
Persian military manual written for the Fauj-i-Khas of the Sikh Empire, ca.1830's

As the primary entry point and frontier region of the Indian subcontinent, the Punjab has had a long association with the Persian language. The name of the region is itself a Persian coinage (panj-āb, transl. 'five waters'). Following the defeat of the Hindu Shahi dynasty, classical Persian was established as a courtly language in the region during the late 10th century under Ghaznavid rule. After Lahore was made the second capital of the Ghaznavids, it played host to great poets in the court, and was settled by many Persian-speakers from the West. The first Indian-born Persian poet was from Lahore, as were the earliest notable figures in Indo-Persian literature, Masud Sa'd Salman and Abu-al-Faraj Runi.

In the 13th century, Nasiruddin Qabacha declared himself independent of the Ghurids. His dominion, the Sindh, was conducive to Persian literary activity at the centres of Multan and Uch, where Muhammad Aufi wrote the Lubab ul-Albab.

Employed by Punjabis in literature, Persian achieved prominence in the region during the following centuries, as the region came under the Delhi Sultanate and the Mughals. The language of the Sikh gurus (Sant Bhasha) incorporated Persian, and some of their works were done entirely in the language; examples are the Zafarnama and the Hikāyatān. Sikhism has since retained many Persian elements in its religious vocabulary.

Persian continued to act as a courtly language for various empires in Punjab through the early 19th century, and dominated most literary spheres. It served finally as the official state language of the Sikh Empire, under which Persian literature such as the Zafarnamah-e-Ranjit Singh was produced, preceding British conquest and the decline of Persian in South Asia. Persian-medium schools in the Punjab lasted until the 1890s. Muhammad Iqbal, a Punjabi, was one of the last prolific writers of Persian in the subcontinent.

=== Kashmir ===
Kashmir was another region impacted heavily by Persian. Though it had long been a centre of Sanskrit literature, the language was in decline from the 13th century, due to internal social factors. Persian was introduced to the region in the 14th century, spreading through the Persianization and Islamisation of Kashmir by early Sufi saints such as Mir Sayyid Ali Hamadani. The emergence of the native Shah Mir dynasty shortly after saw Persian become the official language of administration. Some of its members, chiefly Zain-ul-Abidin, patronised various kinds of literature.

Persian enjoyed a superior position in the valley as prestige language from its early days. It retained its political and literary status for the next 500 years under the Mughals, Afghans, and Sikhs. Poetry, histories and biographies were among some of the works produced over these years, and many Kashmiris received an education in Persian for careers as accountants and scribes in government. Persians often migrated to Kashmir, and the region was known in the Persianate world as Iran-e-saghir/ایران صغیر, means "Little Iran".

The historical prevalence of Persian in the region is illustrated by the case of the Kashmiri Pandits, who adopted Persian in place of their ancestral language Sanskrit, in order to make Hindu teachings more accessible to the population. They translated texts such as the Ramayana and Shivapurana, even composing hymns in praise of Shiva through the medium of ghazal. Some of the earliest Persian literature of the region in fact constituted such translations of Sanskrit works; under the Shah Mirs the monumental Sanskrit history of Kashmir Rajatarangini was translated into Bahr al-asmar, and the efforts of the Pandits added Hindu astronomical and medical treatises to the literature.

The advent of the Dogra dynasty (under British suzerainty) in 1849 led to the decline of Persian in Kashmir. Although they inherited and used a Persian administrative system, social changes brought by them led to Urdu being instituted as the language of administration in 1889.

=== Bengal ===
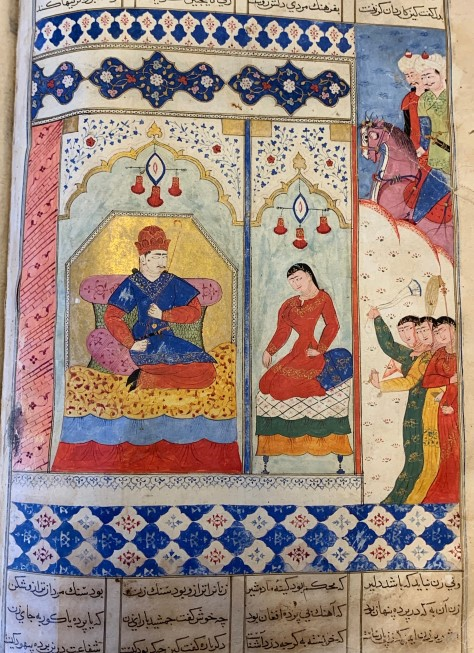
A Sharaf-Nama manuscript that was owned by the Sultan of Bengal Nasiruddin Nasrat Shah. It shows Alexander sharing his throne with Queen Nushabah.

Persian was introduced into Bengal through the Bengal Sultanate, established by the Ilyas Shahi dynasty in the 14th century. During their rule, the language was spoken in the court and employed in administration. It was used primarily in urban centres such as Gaur, Pandua, and Sonargaon, having diffused into the elite population (Muslim and non-Muslim) through the administration. This led to a growing audience for Persian literature, indicated by the famed Persian poet Hafez, who referenced Bengal in a verse from his Diwan:

šakkar-šikan šawand hama ṭūṭiyān-i Hind
zēn qand-i pārsī ki ba Bangāla mē-rawad

— This verse is often partially attributed to Sultan Ghiyasuddin Azam Shah, but doubt has been cast on the historicity of such a claim.
Translation:

All the parrots of India have started crushing sugar
Through this Persian candy which is going to Bengal.

However, Persian was not the sole language of governance; the majority of official documents were written in Arabic, as were most inscriptions. Coins were minted with Arabic text. Notably, there is no evidence of significant Persian literary patronage under the Bengal Sultans; court poetry and creative texts were composed in the Bengali language instead. Persian literature mostly came from outside the court, such as the works of Sufism and the "popular literature" created by Bengali Muslims.

In the 16th century, the Bengal region came under the Mughals to form the Bengal Subah, and in this era Persian's impact was much more profound. Mughal rule brought a highly Persianised court and administration to Bengal, as well as an influx of Iranians and northern Indians. This established Persian as a language of public affairs and courtly circles, and an indispensable tool of social mobility. The Persian language became entrenched in the Bengali Hindu upper class, remaining into the 19th century. The imposition of Mughal administration on the region also meant that the general populace came into contact with officers that did not know Bengali. This led to a diffusion process, as locals learned the Persian language in order to communicate with them.

=== Deccan ===
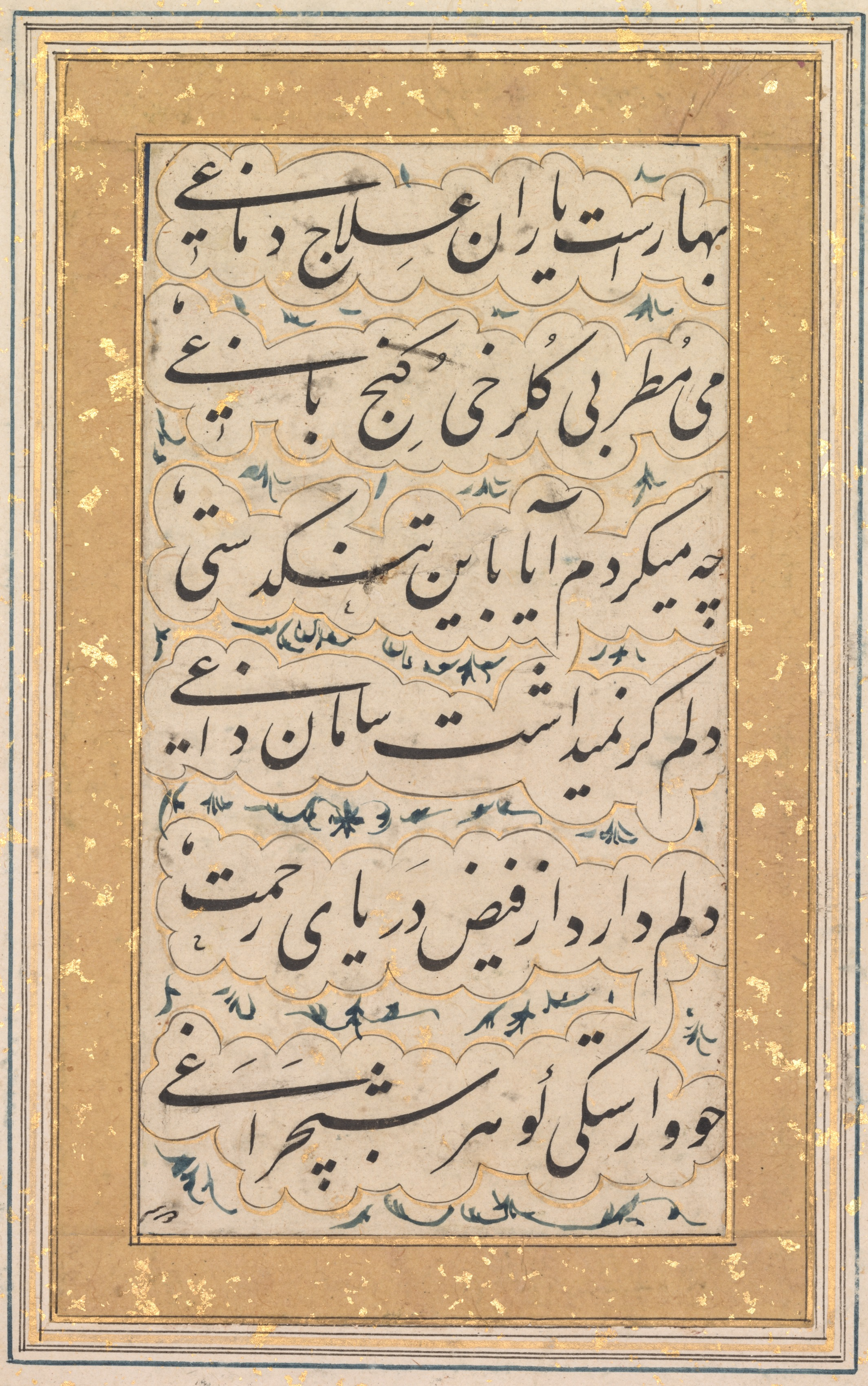
A Persian poem produced in the Deccan. 17th century.

Although considerably distanced from North India, the Deccan was also a recipient of Persian's linguistic impact. Persianate culture was brought to the Deccan fleetingly through the efforts of the Delhi Sultanate in the early 14th century. Persian finally gained a foothold in the region with the establishment of the Bahmani Sultanate in 1347, which used the language for official purposes. The dynasty had a great interest in Persian culture, and several members were proficient in the language, producing their own literature. Literati from Northern India found themselves welcome at the court, and scholars from Iran were invited as well. Madrasas were built over the expanse of the kingdom, such as the Mahmud Gawan Madrasa at Bidar, where Persian was taught. A notable poet patronised by the Bahmans was Abdul Isami, who wrote the first Persian history of the Muslim conquest of India titled Futuh-us-Salatin. In spite of this, Richard Eaton writes that Persian was much less widely understood in the Deccan region than vernacular languages, and contrasts this situation with the Persian proficiency in the north of the subcontinent.

During the turn of the 16th century, the Bahmani Sultanate splintered into the Deccan Sultanates, which were also Persianate in culture. They used Persian as a courtly language, as well as for official and administrative purposes. The language received literary patronage; for example, Persian poet Muhammad Zuhuri, author of the Sāqīnāma, was a prominent figure at Ibrahim Adil Shah II's court in Bijapur. However, the sultans simultaneously promoted regional languages such as Telugu, Marathi, and Deccani (the southern variety of Hindustani), at times even using them in administration. For example, Alam writes that Telugu was the language of the sultan for the Qutub Shahis, and that Persian was removed from the Bijapur Sultanate's administrative system by Ibrahim Adil Shah I in favour of Marathi; these are corroborated by Eaton.

Hyderabad State, ruled by the Nizams of Hyderabad, was one of the last important niches of Persian cultivation in the Indian subcontinent. The princely state used Persian as its official language until 1884, when it was phased out in favour of Urdu.

== Literature ==
A large corpus of Persian literature was produced by inhabitants of the Indian subcontinent. Prior to the 19th century, the region produced more Persian literature than Iran. This consisted of several types of works: poetry (such as rubaʿi, qasida), panegyrics (often in praise of patron kings), epics, histories, biographies, and scientific treatises. These were written by members of all faiths, not just Muslims. Persian also was used for religious expression in the subcontinent, the most prominent example of which is Sufi literature.

This extended presence and interaction with native elements led to the Persian prose and poetry of the region developing a distinct, Indian touch, referred to as Sabk-e-Hindi (Indian style) among other names. It was characterised by an ornate, flowery poetic style, and the presence of Indian vocabulary, phrases, and themes. For example, the monsoon season was romanticised in Indo-Persian poetry, something that had no parallel in the native Iranian style. Due to these differences, Iranian poets considered the style "alien" and often expressed a derisive attitude towards Sabk-e-Hindi. Notable practitioners of Sabk-e-Hindi were Urfi Sherazi, Faizi, Sa'ib Tabrezi, and 'Abd al-Qadir Bedil.

Translations from other literary languages greatly contributed to the Indo-Persian literary corpus. Arabic works made their way into Persian (e.g. Chach Nama). Turkic, the older language of Islamic nobility, also saw translations (such as that of Chagatai Turkic "Baburnama" into Persian). A vast number of Sanskrit works were rendered into Persian, especially under Akbar, in order to transfer indigenous knowledge; these included religious texts such as the Mahabharata (Razmnama), Ramayana and the four Vedas, but also more technical works on topics like medicine and astronomy, such as Zij-i Muḥammad Shahi. This provided Hindus access to ancient texts that previously only Sanskritised, higher castes could read.

Tāza-gōī, which translates to "fresh speech," emerged as a distinctive and highly influential style of Persian poetry in the Indian subcontinent during the Mughal era of 16th and 17th centuries. Poet Shamsur Rahman Farooqi explains that this style is defined by "high imaginative flourishes," "unusual images," and "unconventional constructs" in poetry. This was influenced by patronage in eclectic Indian courts and Sanskrit literary influences. This Indian style became popular even among a large section of poets in Persia and eventually more conservative Iranian literati got alarmed, who by the 20th century, amidst the rise of Iranian cultural nationalism, dismissed it simply as Sabk-e-Hindi (the Indian style) to categorize and distinguish it from "mainline" Iranian poetry.

== Influence on subcontinental languages ==
As a prestige language and lingua franca over a period of 800 years in the Indian subcontinent, Classical Persian exerted a vast influence over numerous Indic languages, which includes non-Indo-Aryan languages. Generally speaking, the degree of impact is seen to increase the more one moves towards the north-west of the subcontinent, i.e. the Indo-Iranian frontier. For example, the Indo-Aryan languages have the most impact from Persian; this ranges from a high appearance in Punjabi, Sindhi, Kashmiri, and Gujarati, to more moderate representation in Bengali, Konkani and Marathi. The largest foreign element in the Indo-Aryan languages is Persian. Conversely, Indo-Aryan languages like Odia, Assamese, Sinhala, as well as the Dravidian languages have seen a low (sometimes even negligible) level of influence from Persian. They still feature loans from the language, some of which are direct, and some through Deccani (the southern variety of Hindustani), due to the Islamic rulers of the Deccan.

Hindustani is a notable exception to this geographic trend. It is an Indo-Aryan lingua franca spoken widely across the Hindi Belt and Pakistan, best described as an amalgamation of a Khariboli linguistic base with Persian elements. It has two formal registers, the Persianised Urdu (which uses the Perso-Arabic alphabet) and the de-Persianised, Sanskritised Hindi (which uses Devanagari). Even in its vernacular form, Hindustani contains the most Persian influence of all the Indo-Aryan languages, and many Persian words are used commonly in speech by those identifying as "Hindi" and "Urdu" speakers alike. These words have been assimilated into the language to the extent they are not recognised as "foreign" influences. This is due to the fact that Hindustani's emergence was characterised by a Persianisation process, through patronage at Islamic courts over the centuries. Hindustani's Persian register Urdu in particular has an even greater degree of influence, going as far as to admit fully Persian phrases such as "makānāt barā-yi farōxt" (houses for sale). It freely uses its historical Persian elements, and looks towards the language for neologisms. This is especially true in Pakistan (see #Contemporary).

The following Persian features are hence shared by many Indic languages but vary in the manner described above, with Hindustani and particularly its register Urdu bearing Persian's mark the most. It is also worth noting that due to the politicisation of language in the subcontinent, Persian features make an even stronger appearance among the Muslim speakers of the above languages.

=== Vocabulary ===
The most significant result of Indo-Persian language contact has been the seepage of a vast and varied Persian vocabulary into the Indic lexicon, particularly the Indo-Aryan languages.

==== Loanwords ====
As the initial contact points of Persianate rule, administration and urban life provided the earliest types of loans in the Indo-Aryan languages. In this initial period, Persian words were often borrowed out of necessity, to describe newly-introduced foreign objects and concepts. Eventually however, Persian loans began to permeate the Indic languages on a broader level. Kuczkiewicz-Fraś identifies poets and Sufis as highly conducive to this process; these groups knew both Persian and local languages, facilitating contact between them and dispersing the same into their followers. The prestige status that Persian later attained under the Mughals resulted in Persian vocabulary being integrated more consciously (rather than out of necessity) into the Indo-Aryan languages.

Today, Persian loans are found in almost all spheres of usage, and nouns make up the largest portion of them. Many are used commonly in everyday speech. They often have an altered pronunciation when compared to modern Iranian Persian; this is partly because the Indic languages took in the older pronunciations of Classical Persian used by Persian speakers in the subcontinent (see #Contemporary section on the nature of this Indian Persian). Nativisation is also responsible for the differences in pronunciation, and is determined by the particular recipient language. One nativisation common to many languages is the elongation of the hā-yi muxtafī in Persian to ā. Hence Classical Persian tāza(h) (fresh) became tāzā, āina(h) (mirror) became āinā (in modern Iranian Persian, these are tāzeh and āineh respectively). Nativisation has also resulted in phonological changes (see #Phonology below). Outside of these differences, some loans may still appear strange to modern (especially Iranian) Persian either due to semantic shift or because the inherited word is now archaic in Persian.

A categorised list of Persian vocabulary (some of them, itself borrowed from Arabic, unless stated otherwise) found in the Indic languages is provided below, and is far from exhaustive:

| Loan category | Examples |
Nouns
| Proper names | Muslim names: Akhtar, Nawaz, Aftab, Dilshad, Zīshān, Shah Bano, Zarina Non-Muslim names: Sikandar, Bahadur, Shah, Chaman, Roshan, Zorawar, Sarkar |
| Titles | Khan Bahadur, Rai Bahadur, Yawar Jang, Salar Jang |
| Parts of the body | badan (body), khūn (blood), nākhūn (nail, of fingers and toes), sīnā (chest), dil (heart), chehrā (face), gardan (neck), zabān (tongue), halq (throat) |
| Place names (Suffixes) | -ābād, -stan, -ganj, -bāgh, -sarāi (Hyderabad, Hazratganj, Arambagh, Mughalsarai) |
| Kinship terms | dāmād (son-in-law), bīwī (wife) shauhar (husband), birādar (brother), hamzulf (husband of sister-in-law) |
| Food | sabzī (vegetables), nān (bread), qōrmā (curry) gōsht (meat), qīmā (minced meat), tandūri (roasted) |
| Clothing | pōshāk (dress), pājāmā/paijāmā (pyjamas), shalwār (tunic), qamīz (shirt), jēb (pocket), astar (inner, lining) |
| House | ghuslkhānā (bathroom), pākhānā (toilet), bāwarchīkhānā (kitchen), darwāzā (door), diwār (wall) |
| Ornaments | zēwar (ornaments), gulband (necklace), dastband (bracelet), pāzēb (anklet) |
| Fruits | sēb (apple), anār (pomegranate), angūr (grapes), nārangī (tangerine), bādām (almond), kishmish (raisin) |
| Vegetables | shalgham (turnip), qaddū (pumpkin), shakarqand (sweet potato) |
| Flora | cinār (plane tree), hinā (henna), banafshā (pansy), gulāb (rose), nīlōfar (water lily), nargis (daffodil) |
| Fauna | sher (lion), khargōsh (rabbit), bulbul (nightingale), bāz (falcon), kabūtar (pigeon) |
| Professions | darzī (tailor), hajjām (barber), sabzī-farōsh (greengrocer), khānsāmā (cook) |
| Agriculture | fasl (crop), paidāwār (yield), rabi (spring), khārif (autumn), ābpashī (watering), nahar (canal), zamīn (land) |
| Time | rōz (day), sāl (year), zamānā (era) |
| Law | adālat (court), qānūn (law), dastūr (constitution), muddai (plaintiff), wakīl (lawyer), muakil (client), ahdnāma (testament), bayān (statement), giraftārī (arrest) |
| Administration | sarkār (government), darbār (court), pādshāh/bādshāh (emperor), wazīr-i āzam (prime minister, grand vizier) pēshwā (Peshwa), tahsīldār (tax collector), zila' (district) |
| Writing | qalam (pen), dawāt (inkpot), syāhi (ink), kāghaz (paper) |
| Religion (non-Arabic terms) | rōza (fasting), namāz (ritual prayer), khudā (God), paighambar (Prophet), bihisht (Paradise), dozakh (Hell), pīr (Sufi master), darwēsh (ascetic) |
| Measurement | gaz (yard), man (a mound), ser (a seer), murabbā (square) |
| Military | sipāhī (soldier), fauj (army), tōp (gun/cannon), tōpchī (gunner), tōpkhānā (artillery) |
| Miscellaneous | āinā (mirror), bāzār (market), dōst (friend), shahar (city) |
Other
| Modifiers: | bilkul (surely/definitely), garm (hot), tāzā (fresh), āzād (free/independent) |
| Other function words: | ki (that), khud (oneself), agar (if), magar (but), lēkin (but), afsōs (alas), shābāsh (well done) |
Sources in order of importance:

===== Indirect loans =====
The Persian, Arabic, and Turkic languages that arrived in the subcontinent shared a sizeable amount of vocabulary due to historical factors surrounding Iran and Central Asia. However it is generally agreed that Persian, with its vast dominance in the Indian subcontinent, was the primary medium of transferring vocabulary from the other two languages.

The majority of Arabic words present in Indic languages entered through Persian; for example, the terms listed under "law" above are of Arabic origin, as are miscellaneous words like "lēkin" and "qalam". This is due to the fact that a vast number of Arabic words had already been assimilated into Persian before it arrived in the Indian subcontinent (see #Background). The largest impact of Arabic in the Indic lexicon is religious terminology (not listed), and many of even these are through Persian. The influence of Persian mediation is observed in the semantic shift of Arabic words in the Indic lexicon; for example, "furṣat" means 'opportunity' in Arabic, but the Indic languages have inherited the Persian-altered meaning 'leisure time'. For these reasons Persian linguistic influence is often termed 'Perso-Arabic'. It is however important to note that Persian being the exclusive vehicle for Arabic in the Indian subcontinent is not a surety, and thus direct loans from Arabic cannot be ruled out.

To a lesser extent, Turkic words also entered through Persian. In general it is unclear which Turkic words are Persian-mediated, and which direct, since Turkic was used (albeit to a limited extent) in the early medieval period of the subcontinent. Additionally, there is the reverse possibility that Turkic may have contributed some Persian words, since it itself had earlier been Persianised in a similar process to that of the Indic languages (see #Background).

==== Compounds ====
Persian has also contributed compound formations in Indic languages, wherein Persian words and affixes are combined with Indic roots:

Compound formations
| Word/Affix | Examples |
|---|---|
| -xānā (house) | jēlxānā (jail), ḍākxānā (post office), juāxāna (casino) |
| -kār (doer) | kalākār (artist), patrakār (journalist), jānkār (one who knows) |
| -dār (having) | phaḷdār (fruitbearing), dhuē̃dār (smoky), dēndār (debtor), bhāgīdār (partner) |
| -bad (bad) | badprakr̥ti (bad habits) |
| -bāz (with the quality of) | cālbāz (schemer), pataṅgbāz (kite-flier), dhōkhēbāz (traitor) |
| bē- (without) | bēcain (restless), bēghar (homeless), bējhijhak (unhesitating) |
| nā- (non) | nāsamajh (without understanding), nākārā (jobless) |

=== Phonology ===
Through loanwords, Persian has introduced the sounds q, kh, gh, z, zh, f into many Indic languages. These have been nativised to k, kh, g, j, jh, ph respectively (e.g. khud → khud, ghulām → gulām). However, the original sounds are considered valid in these languages, with the original forms of z and f occurring very commonly (also partly due to their usage in English). Scripts have also accommodated these sounds; Devanagari adds a dot (nuqta) under the native letters to indicate the Persian loan (क़, ख़, ग़, ज़, झ़, फ़). Urdu retains q, kh, gh and zh to a greater degree, regarding them as proper pronunciation (talaffuz). The same is seen in formal contexts among those speakers of Punjabi, Bengali etc. that draw from Perso-Arabic elements, such as Muslims. Additionally, the sound /ʃ/, or sh appears in the Indo-Aryan languages largely due to the entry of Persian vocabulary (although it also appears frequently in loans from Sanskrit, as well as from European languages, especially English).

=== Grammar ===
A lesser but notable impact of Persian is the transfer of simple grammatical structures. These are the izāfā -ē- (Salām-ē-'Ishq, Shēr-ē-Bangla) and -ō- (rōz-ō-shab). They inherit the same meaning as Persian, but are generally used in more formal, literary contexts. They appear in multiple impacted languages, but to varying extents, with the most usage occurring in the Hindustani register Urdu. Additionally, the conjunction ki used extensively in these languages to mean "that" is drawn from Persian.

In addition to the above features, Urdu in particular has inherited many prepositions from Persian, such as az (from), ba (to), bar (on), dar (in), as well as prepositional phrases like ba'd az ān (afterwards). Urdu also displays the Persian practice of pluralising nouns by suffixing -ān or, less commonly, -hā. Due to the presence of such grammatical elements as well as an extensive repository of Perso-Arabic vocabulary, Urdu is able to admit fully Persian phrases. Note that Urdu here refers to a formal register of Hindustani, and hence such Persianised diction appears in the news, education etc. rather than common speech.

=== Writing systems ===
The prevalence of Persian also resulted in the Perso-Arabic script being adopted (as well as further modified and expanded) for several languages, such as Hindustani (as Urdu), Punjabi, Sindhi, and Kashmiri. Their alphabets differ slightly to accommodate unique sounds not found in Persian. Additionally, the Nastaliq calligraphic hand popularised by Persian is the main style used for writing Urdu and Kashmiri (in the Arabic script) and the main style used for writing Punjabi and Sindhi in Pakistan.

== Contemporary ==
=== Indian Persian ===
The Persian language is now largely defunct in the Indian subcontinent. However, it still lingers in some scholarly and literary circles; for example, the University of Kashmir in Srinagar has been publishing the Persian-language journal Dānish since 1969. Some colleges and universities in India, Pakistan, and Bangladesh offer Persian as a course of study. Commenting on the state of the field in 2008, Abidi and Gargesh wrote that there was a "general lack of interest" in Persian studies.

Though Arabic (especially since the mid-twentieth century) largely dominates the realm of Islamic liturgy and theology in the Indian subcontinent, Persian can be seen in some religious spheres: the dhikr sessions of Sufism often employ Persian poetry in song, and the Sufi devotional music genre of qawwali also uses Persian in parallel with local languages. Famed qawwali singer Nusrat Fateh Ali Khan sang sometimes in Persian.

Indian Persian is linguistically the same as Modern Persian. However, when compared to modern Iranian Persian, it differs significantly in pronunciation. This is because the Persian spoken in the subcontinent is still the Classical Persian historically used as a lingua franca throughout the Persianate world. The most prominent difference is seen in the vowel system: in Iran, the language underwent some isolated developments to reach its present form, by which the eight-vowel system transformed into a six-vowel one. Indian Persian has continued to use the older system, and has hence has been called a "petrification" of Classical Persian. This is apparent in words like shēr (lion, now shīr in Iran) and rōz (day, now rūz). Notably, the Dari Persian of Afghanistan also retains this old system. There have also been some changes in Indian Persian due to nativisation. Nasal vowels, which are not observed in Modern Persian (although they did occur in the Early New Persian), occur in the endings -ān, -īn, and -ūn (mardā̃, dī̃, chū̃; these are indicated in Indian Persian as well as languages of the Indian subcontinent written in various modified Arabic scripts by the letter ں).

The situation is summarised by David Matthews, who says that Persian in the Indian subcontinent is usually pronounced as if it were Urdu. Recently, there have been efforts in the subcontinent to switch to using Persian as it is pronounced in Iran.

=== Sociopolitics ===
Language has always been a part of the dimension of Hindu-Muslim tensions in the Indian subcontinent, and the Perso-Arabic elements in Indo-Aryan languages have especially played a part in this. In 19th-century British India, divisions on religious lines led to Hindus advocating to de-Persianize and de-Arabize language, and Muslims embracing the Perso-Arabic element (and even literally downplaying Sanskritic & Prakritic elements). Such tensions later contributed to the Partition of India. The most significant and lasting impact of the linguistic divide has been the emergence of Hindi and Urdu as two separate literary registers of Hindustani, both of which are recognised on national levels. Conscious attempts to alter language on such a basis have also been observed in other languages that have both Hindu and Muslim speech communities, such as Punjabi, Sindhi, Gujarati (see Lisan ud-Dawat), Kashmiri (and to some extent, Bengali as well, see Dobhashi). Urdu has been undergoing further Persianization (and since the reign of Zia-ul-Haq, hyper-Arabization) in Pakistan, due to a need for new words and coinages to suit modern times.

In the modern era, though Persian is in disuse, Persian loanwords have continued to move into regional languages through Hindustani. A notable example is that of Pakistan, where the imposition of Urdu as national language and its widespread use has led to a growing Perso-Arabic influence on Pakistan's indigenous languages.

=== Zoroastrian Persians ===
The Parsi community speaks a dialect of Gujarati which has been influenced by their ancestral language of Persian. In 1932, the first ever sound film in the Persian language, Dokhtar-e-Lor, was produced in Bombay by Parsi Indians. There is also a small population of Zoroastrian Iranis in India, who migrated in the 19th century to escape religious persecution in Qajar Iran and speak a Dari dialect.

== See also ==
- Indo-Persian culture
- Dobhashi, Perso-Arab-influenced Bengali
- Lisan ud-Dawat, Perso-Arab-influenced Gujarati
- Persian and Urdu
- Persian Inscriptions on Indian Monuments (book)

== Gallery ==
Persian manuscripts

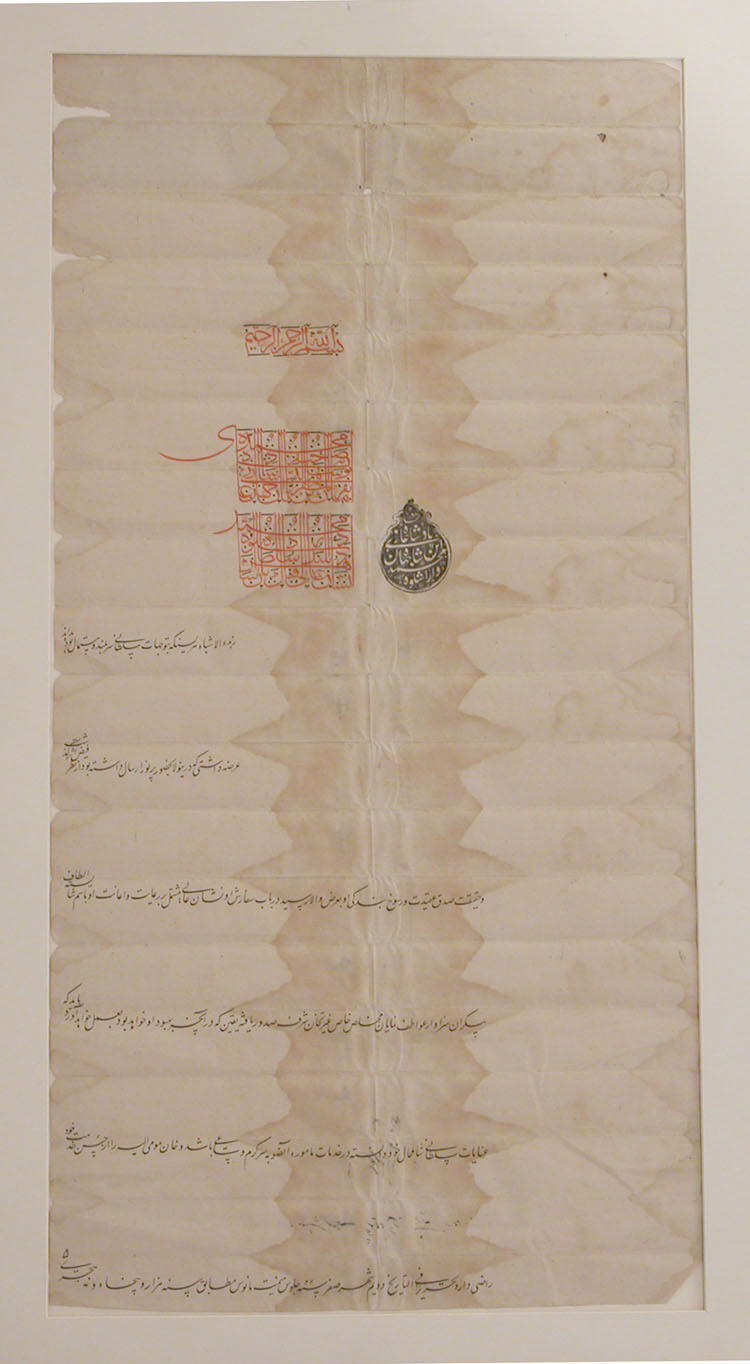
Firman issued under Mughal Prince Dara Shikoh, dated 1649-1650.

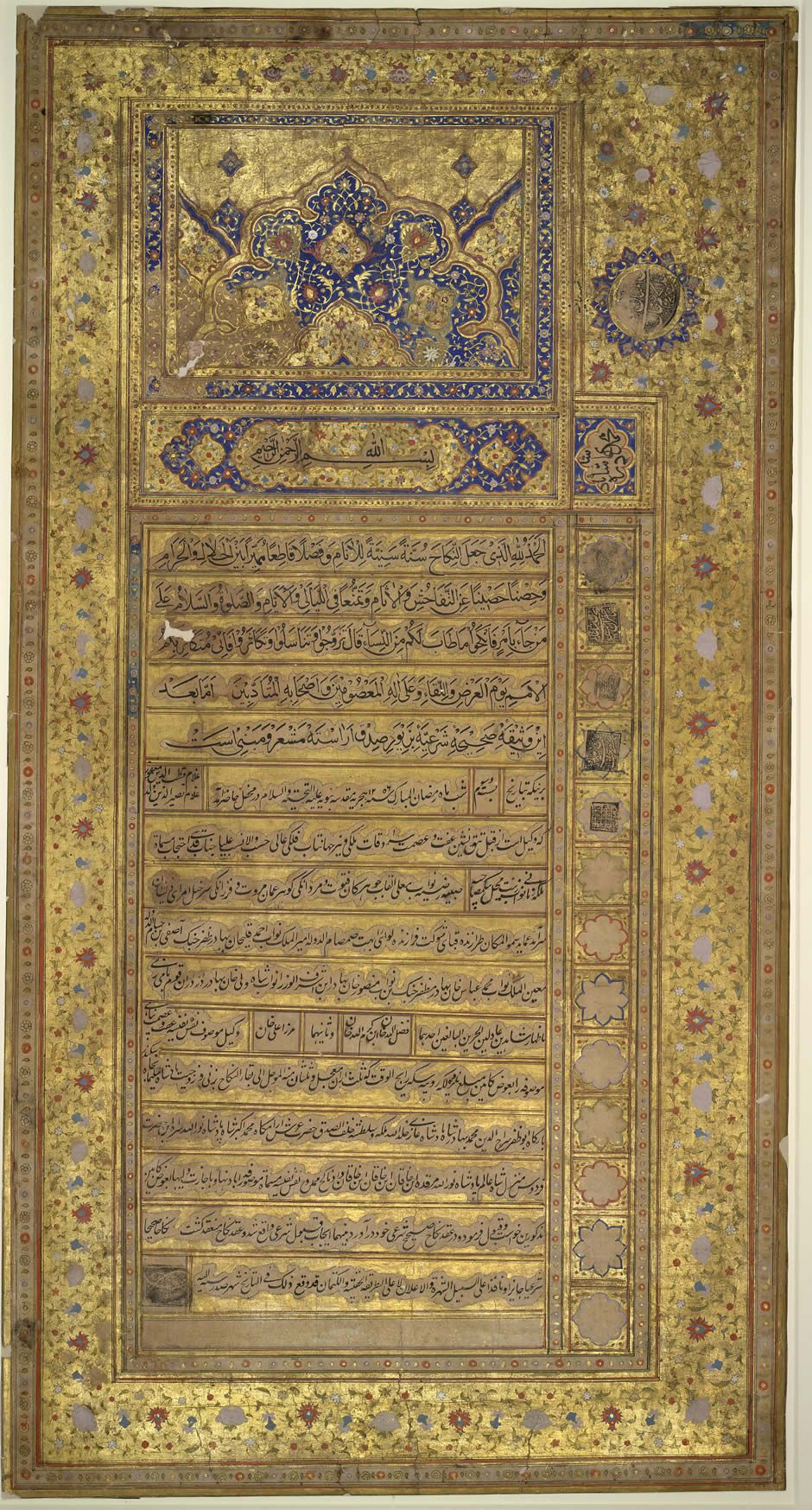
Marriage certificate of last Mughal emperor Bahadur Shah Zafar, 1840.

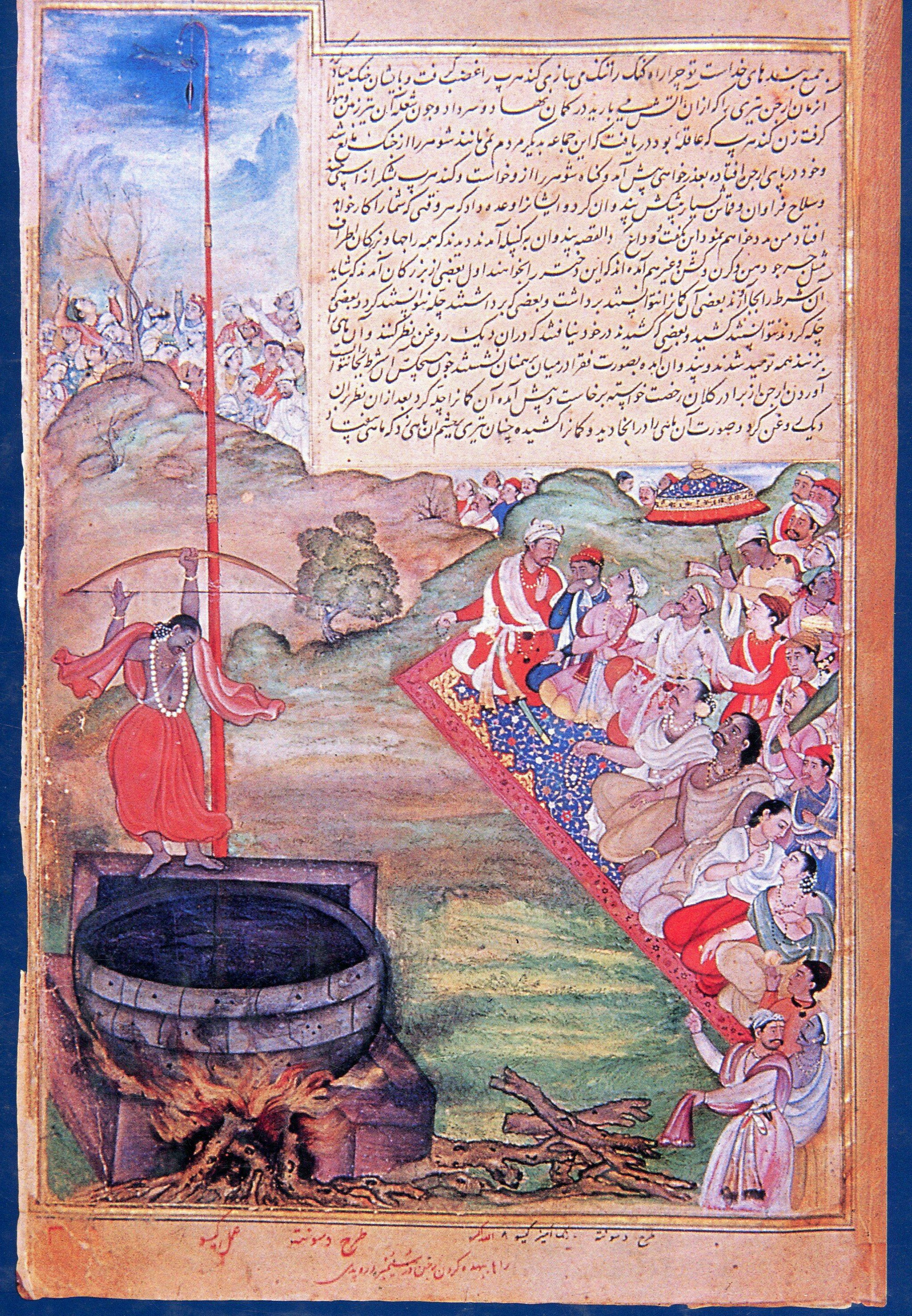
Scene from a Razmnama manuscript: Arjuna hits the fish-eye target, Draupadi's svayamvara.

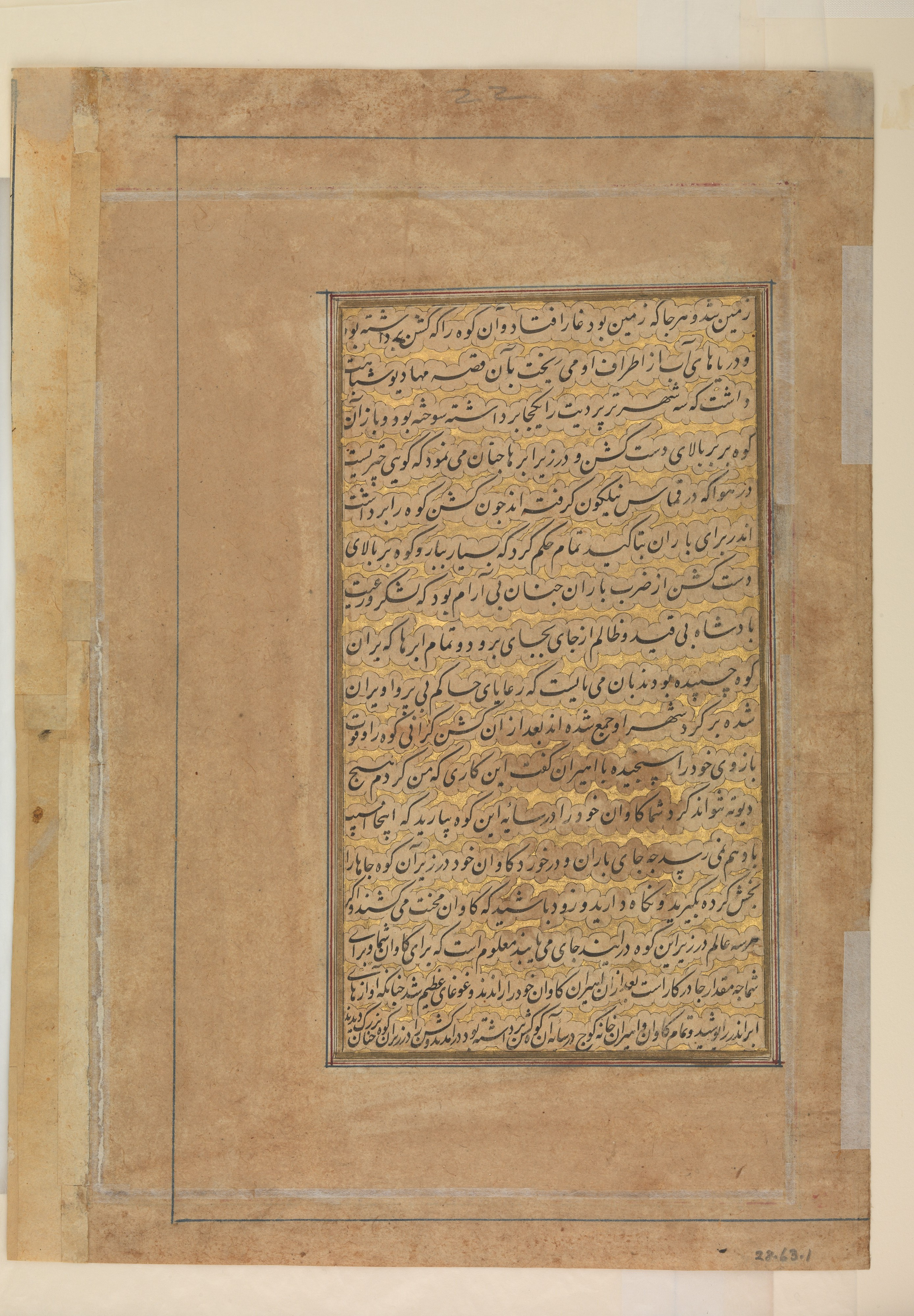
Page from a Persian translation of Harivaṃśa, describing Krishna holding up Mount Govardhana.

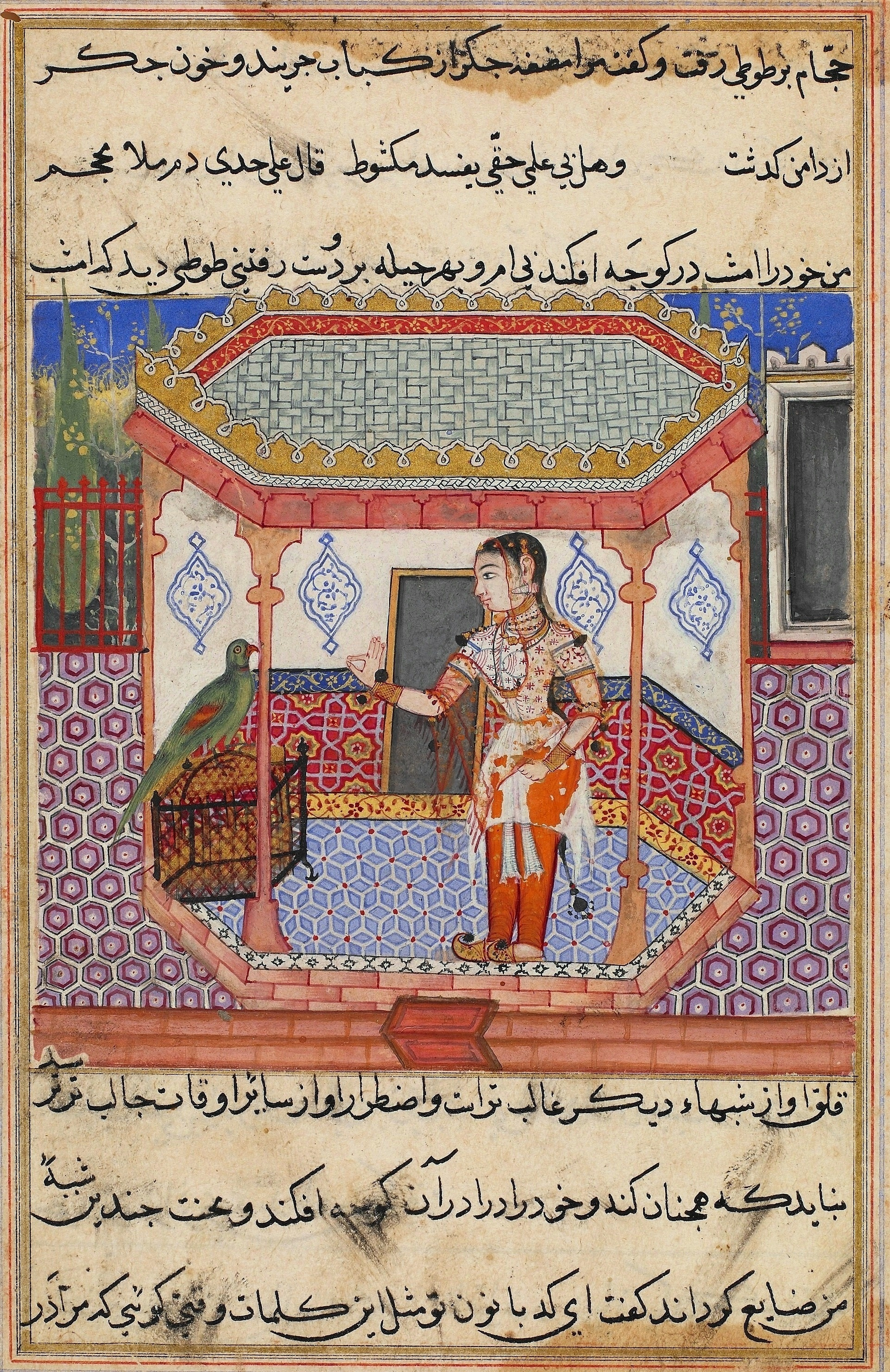
Page from a copy of the Tutinama. While this copy was commissioned by Akbar, the Tutinama itself was a 14th century translation to Persian drawing from the Sanskrit Śukasaptati.

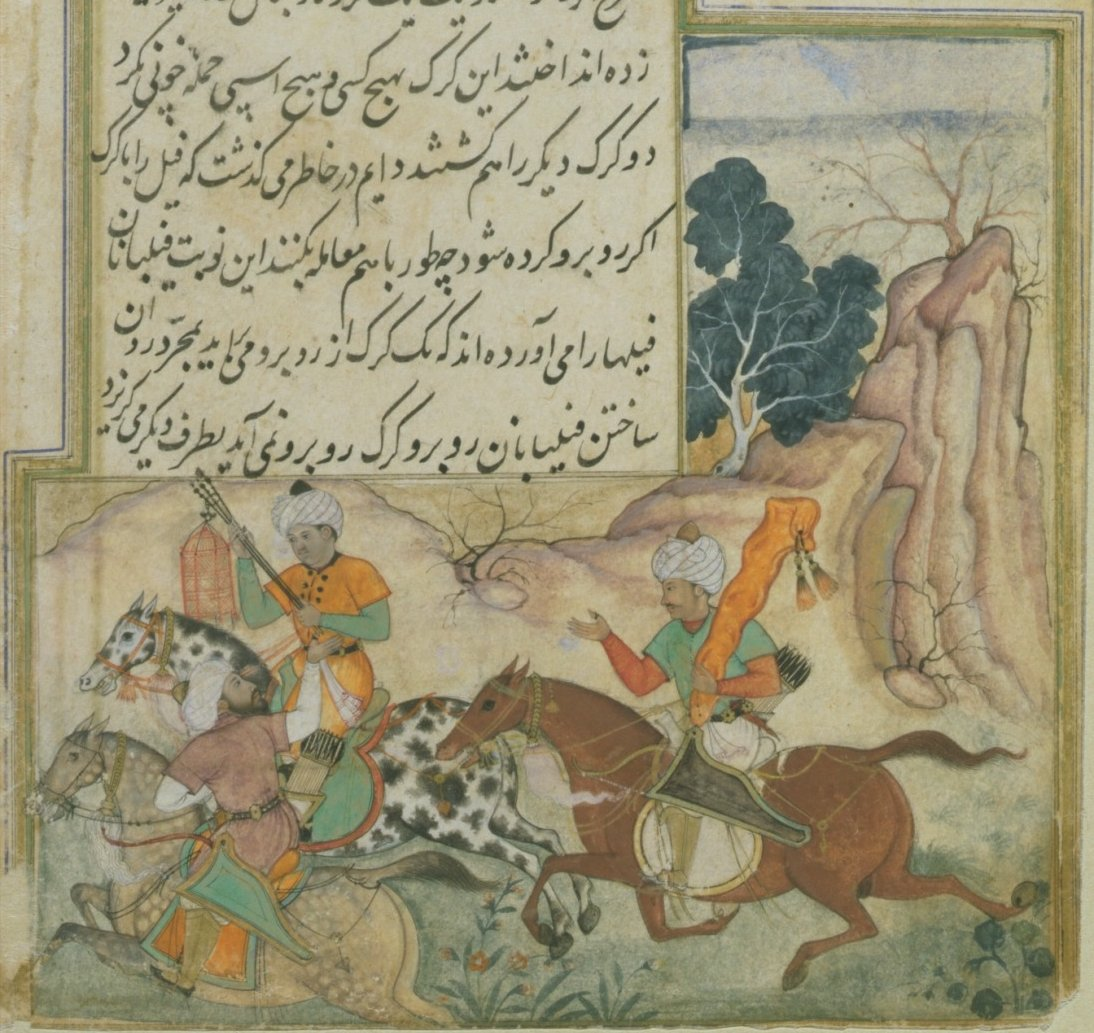
Page from the Persian translation of Babur's memoirs, Baburnama.

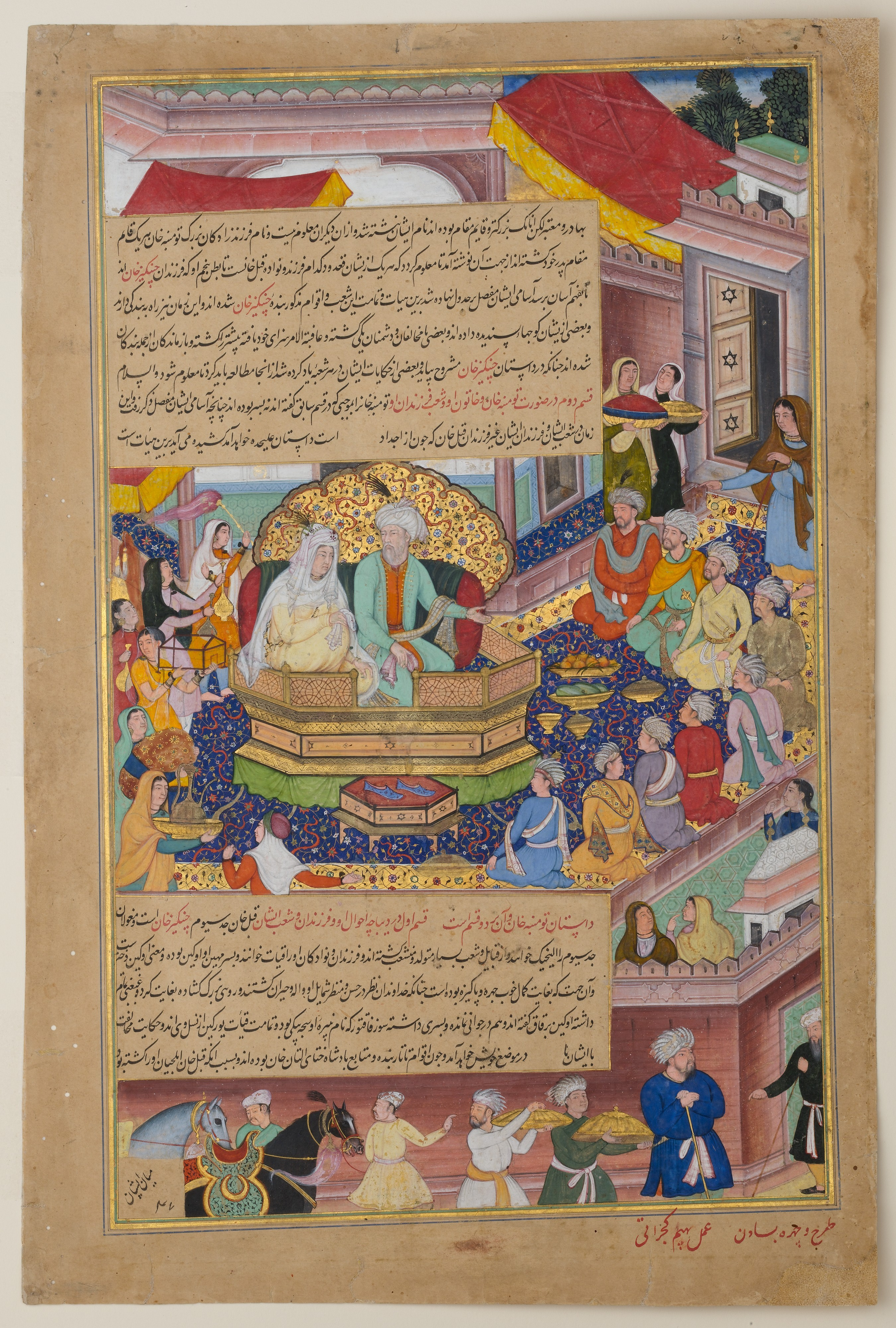
Page from a copy of Chingiz Nama (Book of Genghis), itself an extract of the Jami' al-Tawarikh. Commissioned under Akbar.

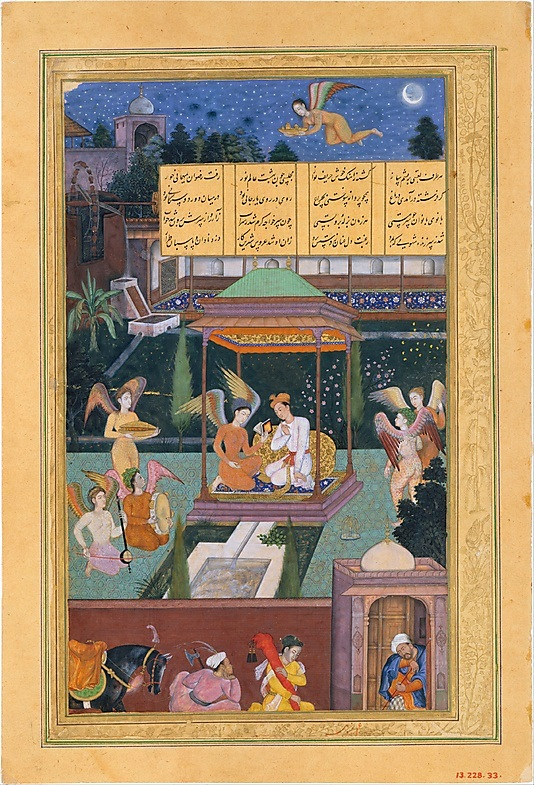
Folio from a copy of Amir Khusrau's Hasht-Bihisht, dated 1597–98.

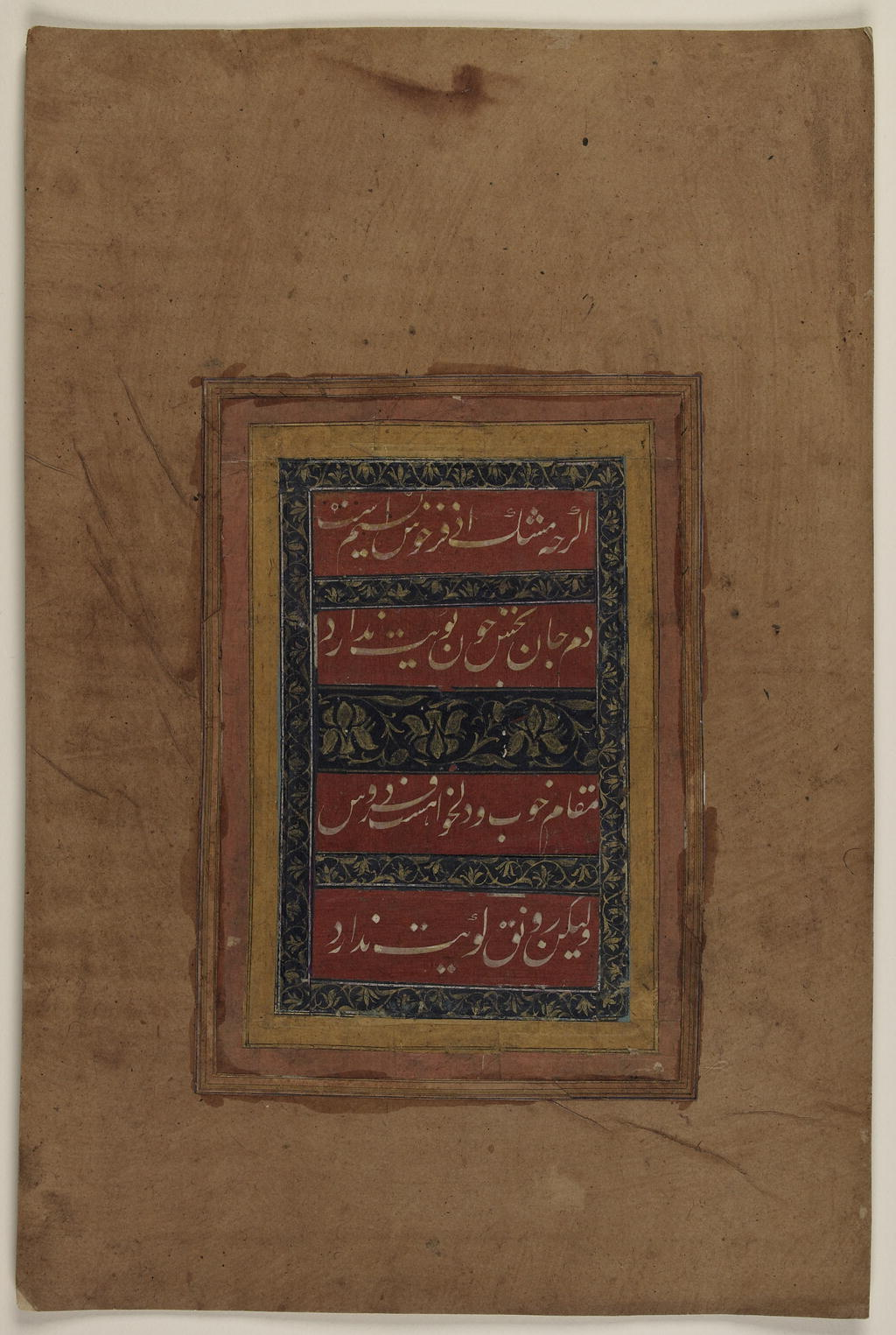
Verses of the Beloved - love poetry by Munshi Ram, Bengal, 18th century.

== Bibliography ==
- Alam, Muzaffar (2003), "The Culture and Politics of Persian in Precolonial Hindustan", in Pollock, Sheldon (ed.), Literary Cultures in History: Reconstructions from South Asia, University of California Press, ISBN 0520228219
- Abidi, S. A. H.; Gargesh, Ravinder (2008), "Persian in South Asia", Language in South Asia, Cambridge: Cambridge University Press, pp. 103–120, doi:10.1017/cbo9780511619069.007, ISBN 978-0-511-61906-9
- Masica, Colin P. (1991), The Indo-Aryan Languages, Cambridge University Press, ISBN 9780521299442
- Chatterjee, Kumkum (2009), "Mapping Early Modern Bengal: Polity, Culture, and the Literary Universe", The Cultures of History in Early Modern India: Persianization and Mughal Culture in Bengal, doi:10.1093/acprof:oso/9780195698800.001.0001, ISBN 9780195698800
- D'Hubert, Thibaut (2019), "Persian at the Court or in the Village? The Elusive Presence of Persian in Bengal", in Green, Nile (ed.), The Persianate World: The Frontiers of a Eurasian Lingua Franca, University of California Press, ISBN 9780520972100
- Kuczkiewicz-Fraś, Agnieszka (2012), Perso-Arabic Loanwords in Hindustani, Part II: Linguistic Study, Archeobooks, ISBN 9788376382944
