= Aftab Ahmed =

Aftab Ahmed or Aftab Ahmad may refer to:

== Politicians ==
- Aftab Ahmed (born 1966), Indian politician from Haryana
- Aftab Ahmed Khan (born 1940) (1940–2022), Indian police officer turned politician

== Cricketers ==
- Aftab Ahmed (Bangladeshi cricketer) (born 1985), Bangladeshi Test cricketer
- Aftab Ahmed (cricketer, born 1931), Pakistani cricketer for Punjab University
- Aftab Ahmed (cricketer, born 1967), Pakistani-born Danish international cricketer
- Aftab Ahmed (cricketer, born 1983), Pakistani cricketer for Public Works Department
- Aftab Ahmed (cricketer, born 1990), Danish international cricketer
- Aftab Ahmed (HBFC and Income Tax Department cricketer), Pakistani cricketer
- Aftab Ahmed (Karachi cricketer), Pakistani cricketer
- Aftab Ahmed (Uttar Pradesh cricketer), Indian cricketer
- Aftab Ahmed (1950s Peshawar cricketer), Pakistani cricketer for Peshawar
- Aftab Ahmed (1970s Jammu and Kashmir cricketer), Indian cricketer
- Aftab Ahmed (1980s Jammu and Kashmir cricketer), Indian cricketer
- Aftab Ahmad Khan (born 1923) (1923–2011), Pakistani Lieutenant-General

== Other people ==
- Aftab Ahmed (photojournalist) (c. 1934–2013), Bangladeshi photojournalist
- Aftab Ahmed (academic) (1949–2006), Bangladeshi academic
- Aftab Ahmed, fictional character in the 1960 Indian film Barsaat Ki Raat
