= Indo-Persian culture =

Cultural synthesis of Indian and Persian culture

Indo-Persian culture refers to a cultural synthesis present on the Indian subcontinent. It is characterised by the absorption or integration of Persian aspects into the various cultures of modern-day republics of Bangladesh, India, and Pakistan. The earliest introduction of Persian influence and culture to the subcontinent was by various Muslim Turko-Persian rulers, such as the 11th-century Sultan Mahmud Ghaznavi, rapidly pushed for the heavy Persianization of conquered territories in northwestern Indian subcontinent, where Islamic influence was also firmly established. This socio-cultural synthesis arose steadily through the Delhi Sultanate from the 13th to 16th centuries, and the Mughal Empire from then onwards until the 19th century. Various dynasties of Turkic, Iranian and local Indian origin patronized the Persian language and contributed to the development of a Persian culture in India. The Delhi Sultanate developed their own cultural and political identity which built upon Persian and Indic languages, literature and arts, which formed the basis of an Indo-Muslim civilization.

Persian was the official language of most Muslim dynasties in the Indian subcontinent, such as the Delhi Sultanate, the Kashmir Sultanate, the Bengal Sultanate, the Mughal Empire and their successor states, and the Sikh Empire. It was also the dominant cultured language of poetry and literature. Many of the Sultans and nobility in the Sultanate period were Persianised Turks from Central Asia who spoke Turkic languages as their mother tongues. The Mughals were also culturally Persianised Central Asians (of Turko-Mongol origin on their paternal side), but spoke Chagatai Turkic as their first language at the beginning, before eventually adopting Persian. Persian became the preferred language of the Muslim elite of northern India. Muzaffar Alam, a noted scholar of Mughal and Indo-Persian history, suggests that Persian became the official lingua franca of the Mughal Empire under Akbar for various political and social factors due to its non-sectarian and fluid nature. The influence of these languages led to a vernacular called Hindustani that is the direct ancestor language of today's Hindi–Urdu varieties.

The Persianisation of the Indian subcontinent resulted in its incorporation into the cosmopolitan Persianate world of Ajam, known today academically as Greater Iran, which historically gave many inhabitants a secular, Persian identity.

== History ==
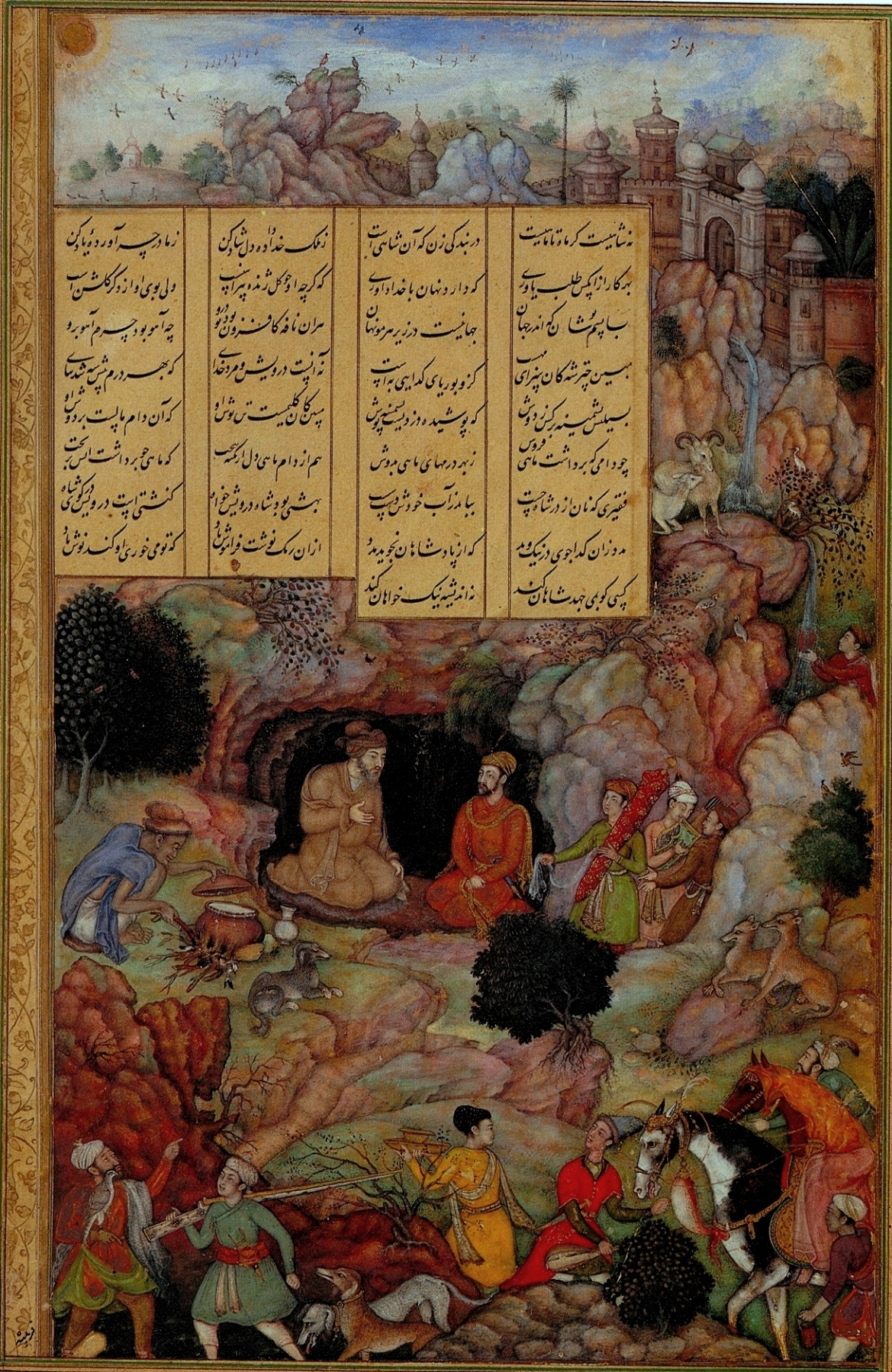
Alexander Visits the Sage Plato, from Khamsa-e Nizami by the Persian poet Amir Khusro.

With the presence of Islamic culture in the region in the Ghaznavid period, Lahore and Uch were established as centres of Persian literature. Abu-al-Faraj Runi and Masud Sa'd Salman (d. 1121) were the two earliest major Persian poets based in Lahore. The earliest of the "great" Indo-Persian poets was Amir Khusrow (d. 1325) of Delhi, who has since attained iconic status within the Urdu speakers of the Indian subcontinent as, among other things, the "father" of Urdu literature.

=== Delhi sultanate and the Mughal era ===
Indo-Persian culture flourished in North India during the period of the Delhi Sultanate (1206–1526). The invasion of Babur in 1526, the end of the Delhi Sultanate and the establishment of what would become the Mughal Empire would usher the golden age of Indo-Persian culture with particular reference to the art and architecture of the Mughal era.

During the Mughal era, Persian persisted as the language of the Mughals up to and including the year 1707 which marked the death of the Emperor Aurangzeb, generally considered the last of the "Great Mughals". Thereafter, with the decline of the Mughal empire, the 1739 invasion of Delhi by Nader Shah and the gradual growth initially of the Hindu Marathas and later the European power within the Indian subcontinent, Persian or Persian culture commenced a period of decline although it nevertheless enjoyed patronage and may even have flourished within the many regional empires or kingdoms of the Indian subcontinent including that of the Sikh Maharaja Ranjit Singh (r. 1799–1837).

Persian as a language of governance and education was abolished in 1839 by the British East India Company and the last Mughal emperor Bahadur Shah Zafar, even if his rule was purely symbolic or ceremonial, was dethroned in 1857 by the British.

Further, C.E. Bosworth writes about the significance of Persian culture that developed a mark within Muslim sultans in this era that: "The sultans were generous patrons of the Persian literary traditions of Khorasan, and latterly fulfilled a valuable role as transmitters of this heritage to the newly conquered lands of northern India, laying the foundations for the essentially Persian culture which was to prevail in Muslim India until the 19th century."

=== Deccan ===
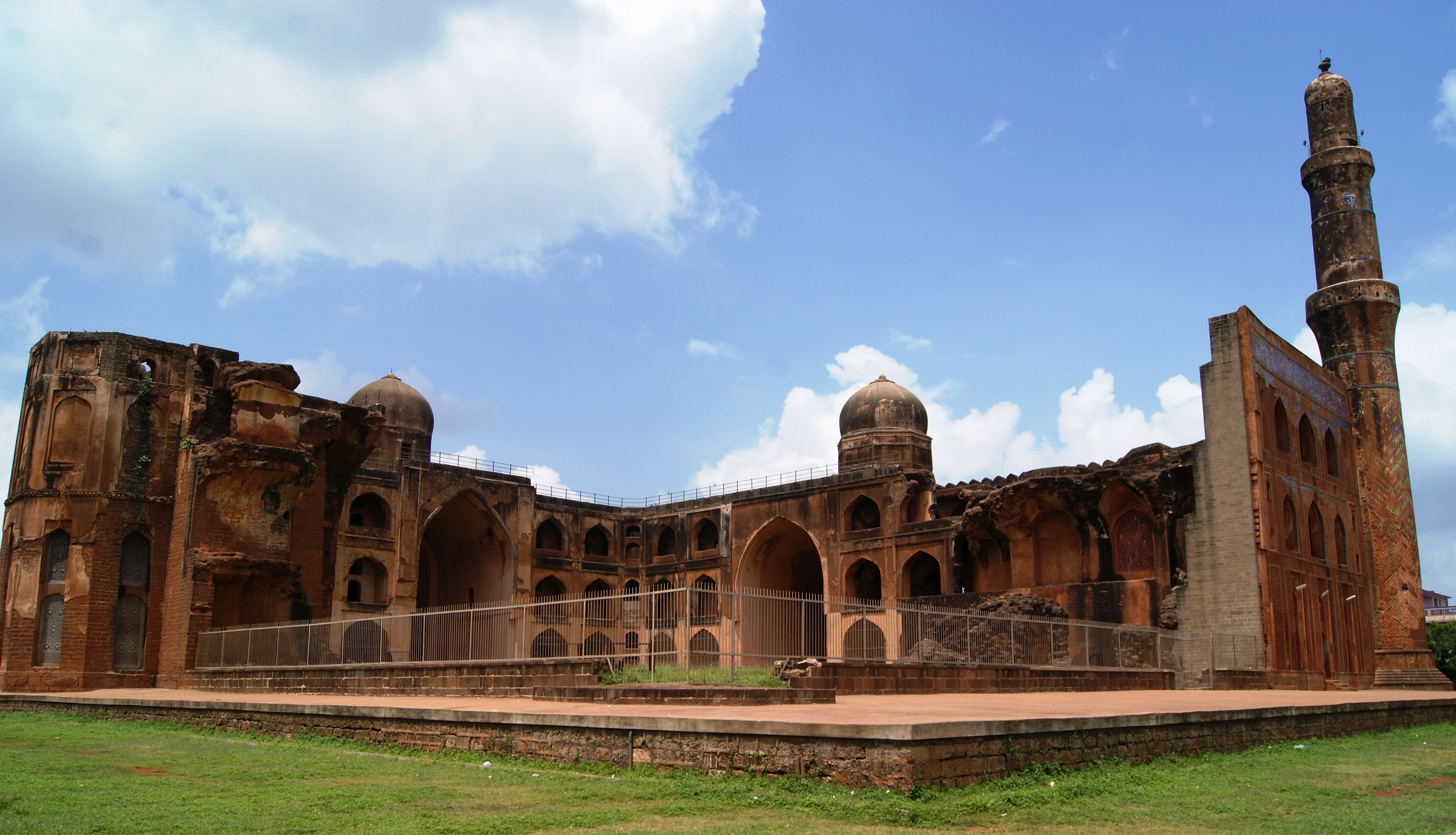
Ruins of a madrassa built by Mahmud Gawan, the Bahmani minister.

The Deccan region's integration into the Indo-Persian culture of the north began in the early 14th century, when the Delhi Sultanate made political movements towards the south, and the Deccan was brought into the Sultanate under the conquests of the Tughluq dynasty. Due to the Sultan Muhammad Shah policy of ordering a migration of the North Indian Muslim population of Delhi to the Deccan city of Daulatabad in 1327, in order to build a large Muslim urban centre in the Deccan. This led to a formal introduction of Indo-Persian culture in the Deccan, extending beyond the realm of the court.

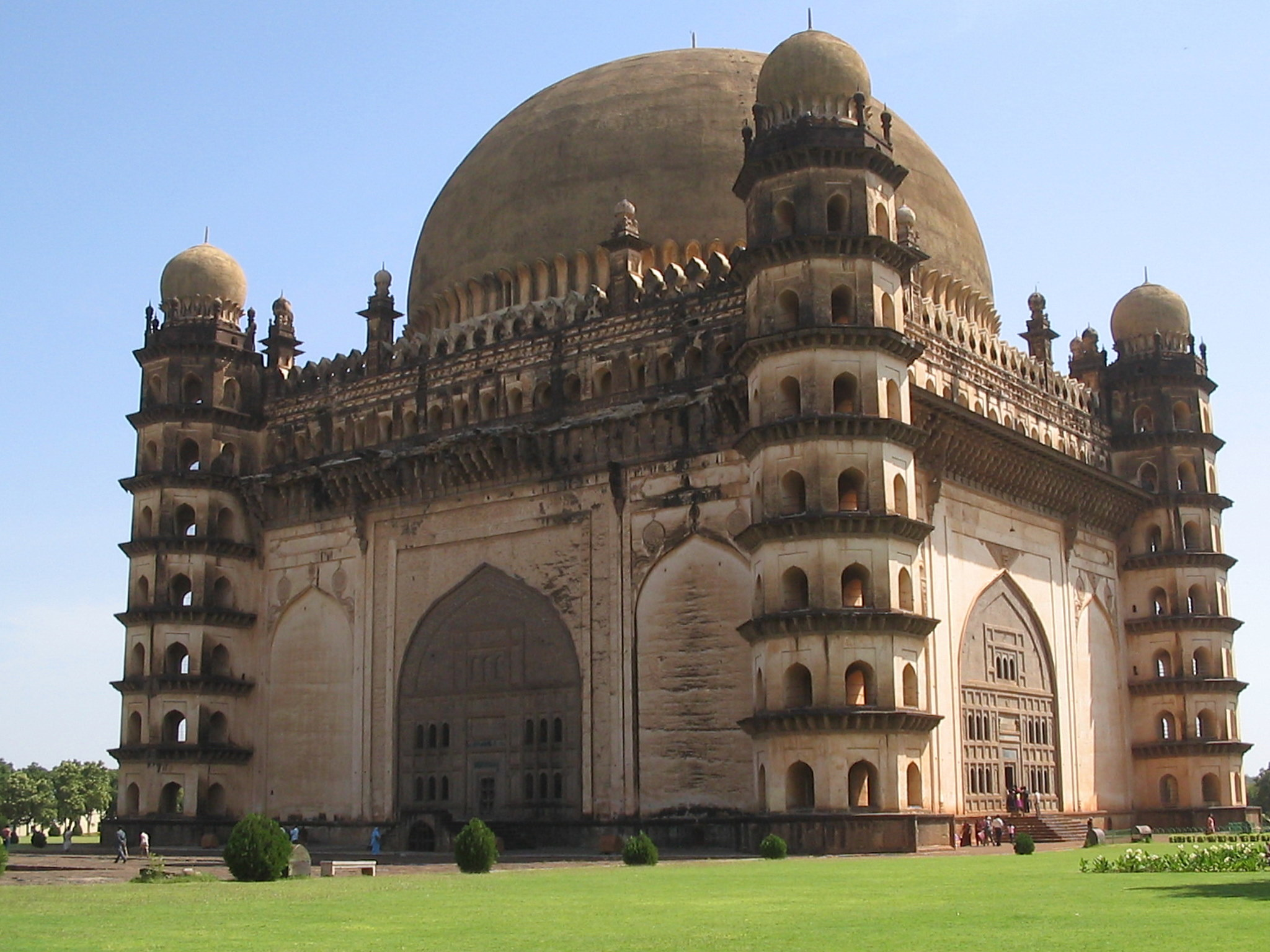
Gol Gumbaz, the mausoleum of Mohammed Adil Shah, Sultan of Bijapur.

In the middle of the 14th century, the Urdu-speaking immigrant population of Daulatabad staged a revolt breaking off from the Delhi Sultanate, but Indo-Persian culture lived on in the region. The breakaway Bahmani Sultanate was established in 1347, by Hasan Gangu. Its rulers were greatly influenced by Persian culture, they were well-versed in the language and its literature, and promoted Persian language education throughout their empire. The Persianised nature of the court is reflected in the fact that the Bahmanis celebrated festivals like Nowruz. The architecture cultivated by them had significant Iranian influences, even more than that of the Muslims in the north.

The Bahmani Sultans actively recruited Persian or Persianised men in their administration, and such foreigners were in fact favoured over Indians who were known as the Dakhani. Sultan Firuz Shah (1397–1422) sent ships from his ports in Goa and Chaul to the Persian Gulf to bring back talented men of letters, administrators, jurists, soldiers and artisans. This included the high-born Iranian Mahmud Gawan (1411–1481) who rose to become a powerful minister of that state during the reign of another Bahmani Sultan.

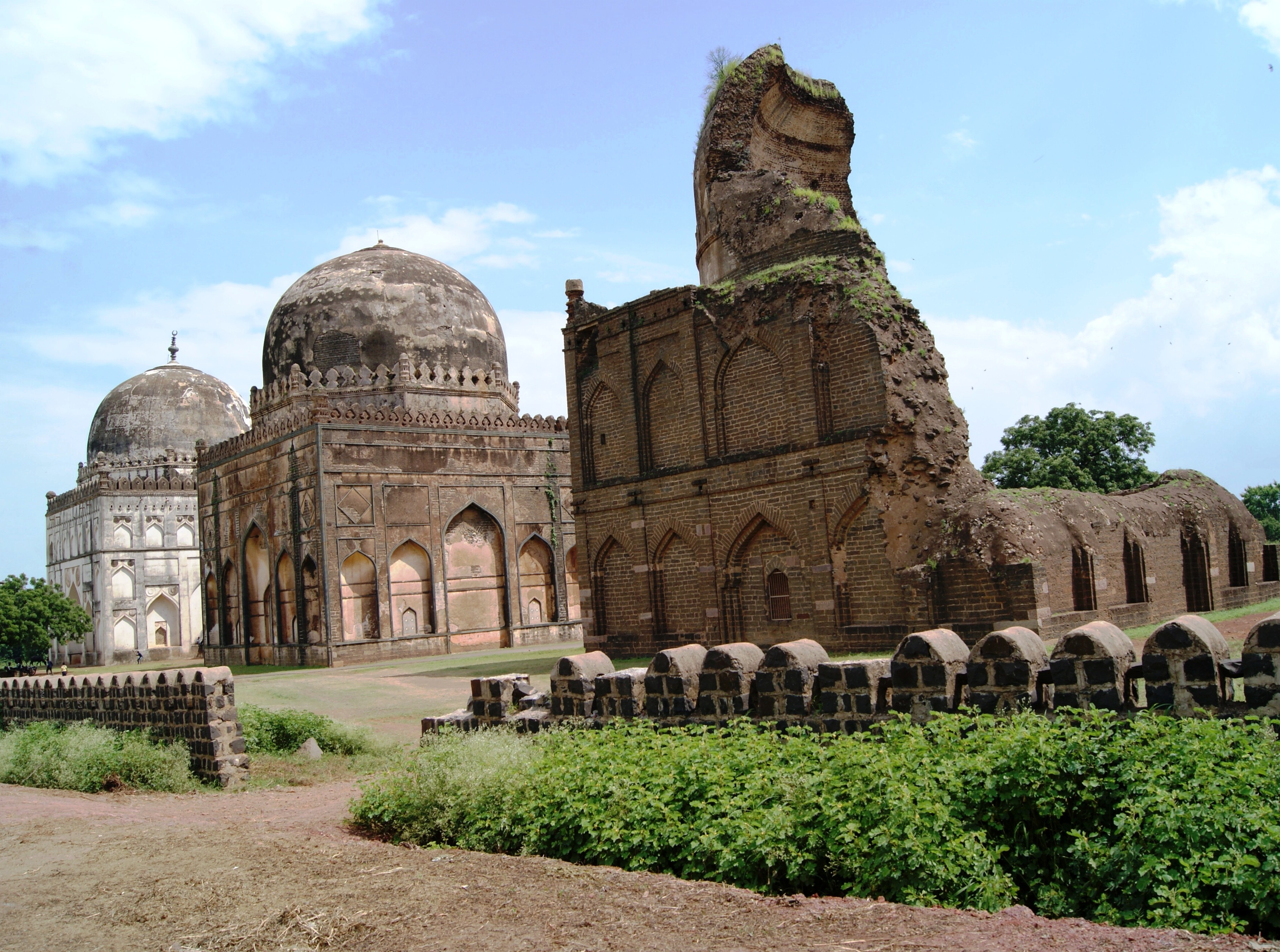
Bahmani Tombs

This led to factional strife between the Dakhanis, the ruling indigenous Muslim elite of the Bahmanid dynasty, being descendants of Sunni immigrants from Northern India, and the foreign newcomers like Mahmud Gawan who were called the Afaqis(Cosmopolitans or Travellers). According to Richard Eaton, Dakhanis believed that the privileges, patronage and positions of power in the Sultanate should have been reserved solely for them, based on their ethnic origin and their sense of pride of having launched the Bahmanid dynasty. Eaton also cites a linguistic divide where the Dakhanis spoke the Dakhni dialect of the Urdu language while the Afaqis favored the Persian language. In 1481, the Dakhanis poisoned the ears of the Sultan, leading to the execution of Mahmud Gawan. What followed was a wholescale massacre of the Iranian Georgian and Turkmen population in the urban centres by Nizam-ul-Mulk Bahri, who lead the Deccani faction. Factional strife between the Afaqis and Dakhanis resulted in pitched battles with the Afaqis usually being victims of violence due to the Deccanis' greater ties to local military networks. This frequently resulted in indiscriminate violence towards people of Iranian origin including learned men, pilgrims, petty merchants, nobles and servants, such the massacres of foreigners of Chakan in 1450, Bidar in 1481, and Ahmadnagar in 1591 by the Deccan Muslims. According to Eaton, the Dakhanis and Afaqis represented more than just two competing factions jostling for influence in the court; they stood for differing conceptions of state and society. If the Dakhanis manifested a colonial idea, namely, a society composed of transplanted settler-founders and their descendants, the Afaqis or Cosmopolitans represented a cultural idea, a refined style of comportment, an eminent tradition of statescraft, a prestigious language. Since each class was legitimate in its own way, neither could be fully disloged from the Bahmanid political system or the Deccan Sultanates. However, the activity of the Afaqis, unlike the Dakhani Muslim nobles, were solely dependent on the patronization of their host Dakhani Sultans, so that whenever there was a change or instability in the court, the Afaqis would leave altogether. Sebouh Aslanian described this mobile community as a "circulation society". According to Roy Fischel, more than any other group, the Dakhani Muslims were the social group that were most associated with the Deccan Sultanates, and the most dominant political group when it comes to determining the direction of the Sultanates.

According to Richard Eaton, even the Hindu Vijayanagara empire from the same period was highly Persianised in its culture. The royal quarters of the capital had many Persian architectural elements such as domes and vaulted arches.

The Bahmani Sultanate disintegrated into five Deccan Sultanates, similar in culture. Hyderabad, built by the Golconda Sultanate in the 16th century, was inspired by Isfahan. The use of Persian as a court language in Hyderabad continued under the Nizams of Hyderabad, and was only replaced by Urdu in 1886.

The court language during the Deccan sultanate period was Persian or Arabic, however, Marathi was widely used during the period especially by the Adil Shahis of Bijapur and the Ahmadnagar Sultanate. Although the rulers were Muslims, the local feudal landlords and the revenue collectors were Hindus and so was the majority of the population. Political expediency made it important for the sultans to make use of Marathi. Nevertheless, Marathi in official documents from the era is totally Persianised in its vocabulary. The Persian influence continues to this day with many Persian derived words used in everyday speech such as bāg (Garden), kārkhānā (factory), shahar (city), bāzār (market), dukān (shop), hushār (clever), kāgaz (paper), khurchi (chair), zamīn (land), zāhirāt (advertisement), and hazār (thousand).

=== Bengal ===
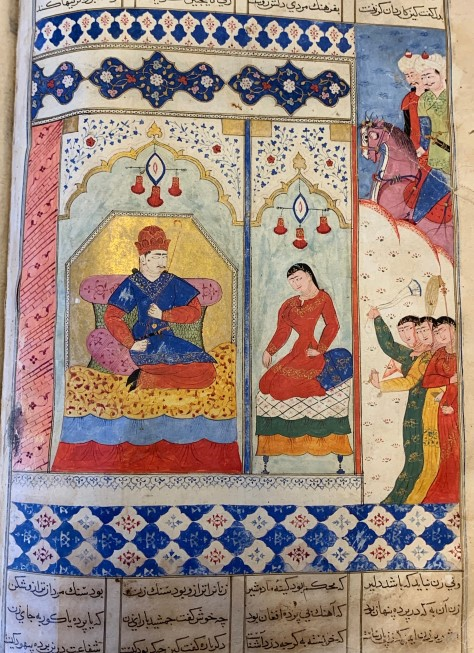
A Persian manuscript produced for the Bengali sultan Nasiruddin Nasrat Shah. The scene depicts Alexander the Great sharing his throne with Queen Nushabah of Barda.

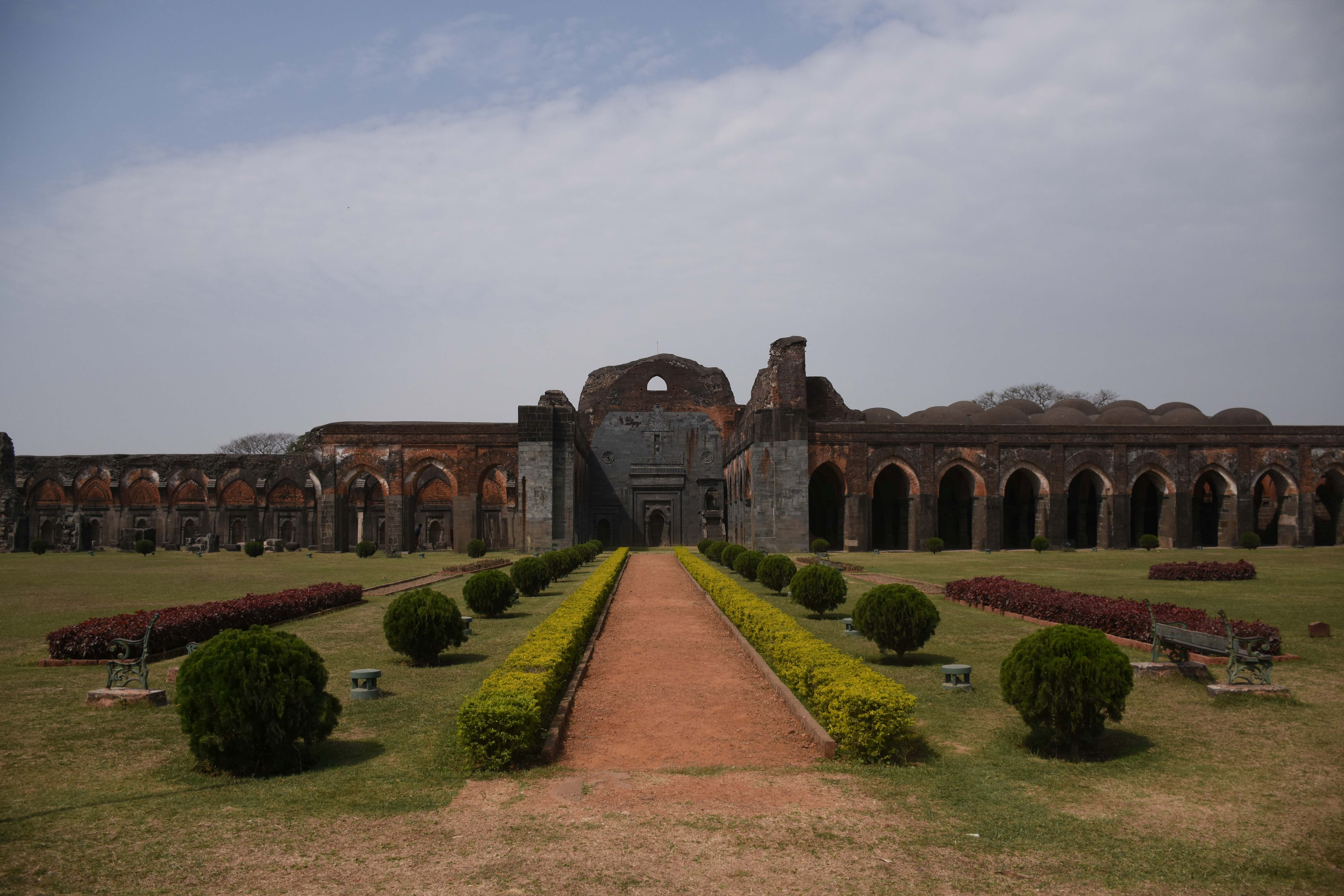
Adina Mosque, Pandua

Bengal was the easternmost frontier of the Persian cultural sphere. For over 600 years (1204–1837), the Persian language was an official language in Bengal, including during the provincial period of the Delhi Sultanate; the independent period of the Bengal Sultanate; the dominion period of the Bengal Subah in the Mughal Empire; and the quasi-independent Nawabi period. Bengal was the subcontinent's wealthiest region for centuries, where Persian people, as well as Persianate Turks, settled in the Ganges delta to work as teachers, lawyers, poets, administrators, soldiers and aristocrats. The Bengali language continues to have a significant number of Persian loanwords. A popular literary dialect called Dobhashi emerged which mixed Persian and Bengali words as a writing format. Several Bengali cities were once centres of Persian prose and poetry. Hafez, one of the masters of Persian poetry, kept a notable correspondence with Sultan Ghiyasuddin Azam Shah and they composed a poem together. The Mughal period saw the zenith of Persian cultural expression in Bengal.

During the Bengali Renaissance, Persian was studied by not only Bengali Muslims but even Hindu scholars, including Raja Ram Mohan Roy. From the mid-eighteenth century towards the 19th century, five to six daily magazines were published in Calcutta, most notably the Durbin and the Sultan al-Akhbar.

The use of Persian as an official language was prohibited by Act no. XXIX of 1837 passed by the President of the Council of India in Council on 20 November 1837.

== During the British colonial era ==
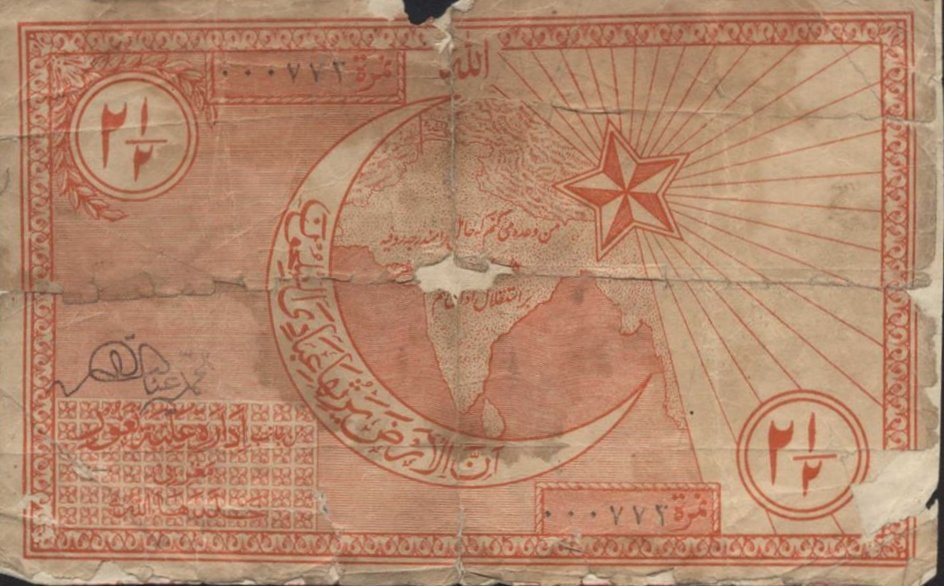
Image of the Punjabi Khaksar Movement's poster for the freedom of British India, written in Persian

Given that the Mughals had historically symbolised Indo-Persian culture to one degree or another, the dethroning of Bahadur Shah Zafar and the institution of the direct control of the British Crown in 1858 may be considered as marking the end of the Indo-Persian era, even if, after the Indian Rebellion, Persian would still retain an audience and even produce commendable literature such as the philosophical poetry of Muhammad Iqbal (d. 1938). The British would absorb elements of the culture's architectural style into the buildings of the Raj, producing Indo-Saracenic architecture. For 20th century Indian Muslims, and Urdu poets in particular, learning the Persian language was viewed as necessary for a full understanding of Urdu and central to the comportment of an educated North Indian Muslim man.

== Adab ==
In Indo-Persian cultures in North India, Adab, which could be understood as a form of virtue ethics, is a code of values determining social behavior that forms the defining characteristic in Indo-Muslim culture.

== Cuisine ==
The Indo-Persian synthesis led to the development of cuisine that combined indigenous foods and ingredients with the tastes and methods of the Turko-Persians. This was especially under the Mughals, who invited cooks (bawarchis) from various parts of the Islamic world. This resultant cuisine is referred to as Mughlai cuisine, and has left a great impact on the regional eating habits of South Asia. It was further developed in the kitchens of regional Islamic powers, leading to distinctive styles such as the Awadhi and Hyderabadi cuisines.

Due to this synthesis, the Indian subcontinent shares Central and West Asian food, such as naan and kebab, and is home to unique dishes such as biryani.

== Architecture ==
The Indian subcontinent's Islamic period produced architecture that drew stylistically from Persianate culture, using features such as domes, iwans, minars, and baghs. Early Islamic rulers tended to use spolia from Hindu, Buddhist, and Jain buildings, resulting in an Indianised style which would be refined by later kingdoms. Hence monuments came to feature uniquely Indian architectural elements, such as corbelled arches and jali. The main buildings produced were mosques, forts, and tombs. These still stand today and are well-represented in the architecture of cities such as Delhi, Lahore, and Hyderabad, to name a few.

Indo-Persian architecture was not exclusive to Islamic power, as the members and rulers of other religions incorporated it in their monuments. Sikh architecture is a notable example of this. The Hindu Vijayanagara Empire used Indo-Persian architecture in courtly monuments.

== Music ==
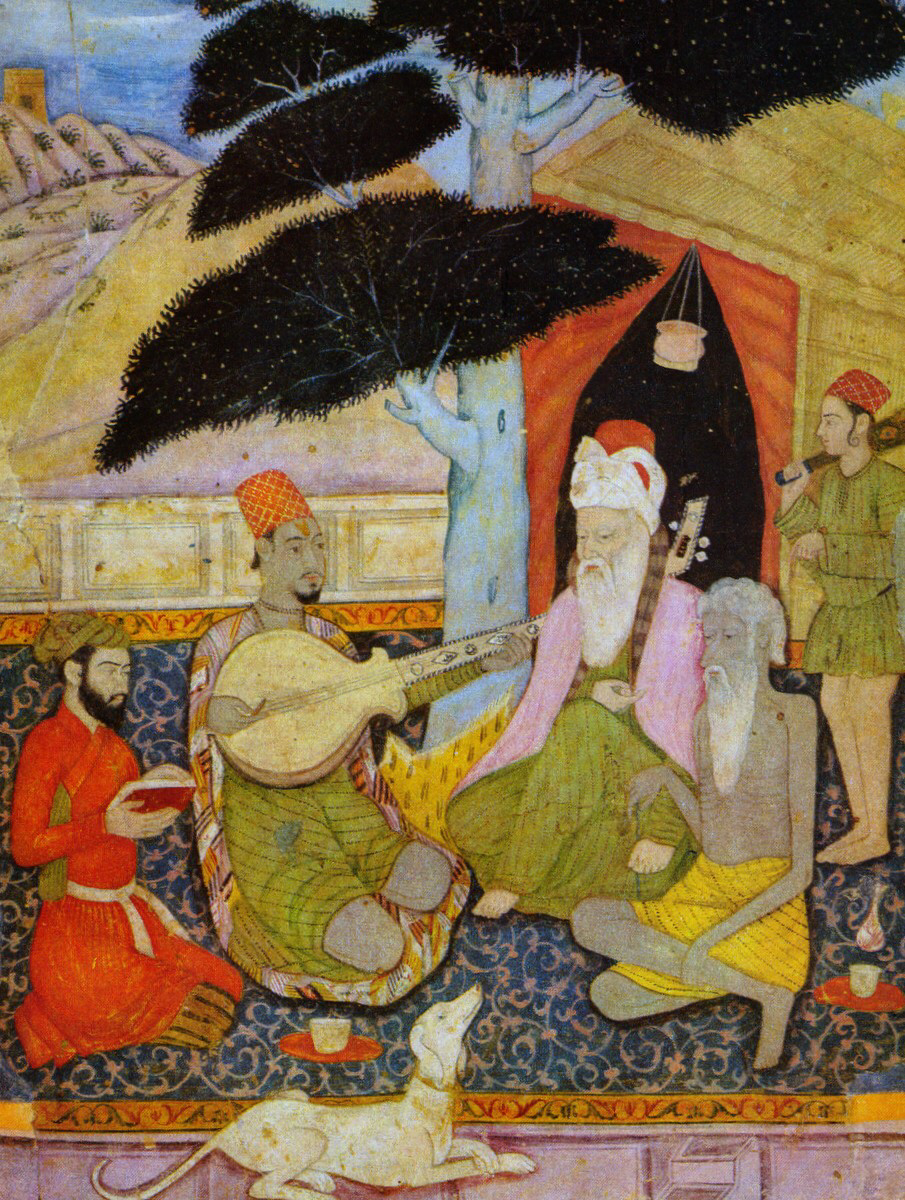
Golkonda 1660–1670. Musician plays a form of rubab. Related instruments include the medieval Iranian rubab, the rubab of Afghanistan, Pakistan and Northern India, the Indian sarod, sursingar and kamaica, the Nepali-Tibetan-Bhutanese tungana, the Pamiri rubab and the Uyghur rawap. The family of instruments blended Persian and Indian cultures, and has been played by Hindus, Buddhists and Muslims.

Prior to Islamic conquest, the Indian subcontinent had a history of musical practice that drew from Sanskritic culture. The subsequent Indo-Persian synthesis resulted in an influx of Iranian musical elements, leading to further developments in the region's musical culture through the patronage of new Persianate rulers. This appears to have been the impetus for divergence in indigenous music, leading to the divergence of Hindustani classical music from Carnatic Music. Some of the main instruments used in this style, such as the sitar, santoor and sarod, are thought to have close historical ties with Persian instruments (for an example, see setar). Musical genres such as khyal and tarana, and the musical performance of ghazals, are examples of the Indo-Persian musical confluence. Notably, the Sufi devotional music of qawwali bears evident impact from Persian influence, such as the frequent usage of Persian poems.

The creation of many of these practices is credited to 13th-century poet, scholar, and musician Amir Khusrau.

== See also ==
- Central Asians in ancient Indian literature
- Greater Iran
- Indo-Islamic architecture
- Islam in South Asia
- Mughal architecture
- Mughal clothing
- Persianate society
- Persian Inscriptions on Indian Monuments
- Persianization
- Persian language in the Indian subcontinent
- Turco-Mongol culture
- Turco-Persian culture
- Urdu

== Bibliography ==
- Eaton, Richard (2008), A Social History of the Deccan, 1300-1761, Cambridge University Press, ISBN 9781139053907
- Yazdani, Ghulam (1947). Bidar, Its History and Monuments.
