= Aftabuddin (disambiguation) =

Aftabuddin or Aftab Uddin is a Muslim masculine given name of Arabic origin. Notable people with the name include:

- Fakir Aftabuddin Khan (1862–1933), Bengali musician, composer and lyricist
- Aftab Uddin Chowdhury (1912–1985), Bangladeshi politician
- Aftabuddin Ahmad, East Pakistani politician
- Aftab Uddin Bhuiyan (died 1995), Bangladeshi politician
- Aftabuddin Mollah, Assam politician
- Aftab Uddin Howlader, Bangladeshi politician
- Aftab Uddin Sarkar (active 1969–2014), Bangladeshi politician
- Aftabuddin Alam (born 1993), Indian cricketer

== See also ==
- Aftab
- Uddin
