= Jethmalani =

Jethmalani is a Sindhi Hindu surname. Notable people with the surname include:

- Ram Jethmalani (1923–2019), Indian lawyer and politician
- Kamna Jethmalani (born 1985), Indian actress
- Mahesh Jethmalani (born 1956), Indian lawyer and politician
