= Aftab =

Aftab (Persian: آفتاب, romanized: āftāb, lit. 'sun,sunshine') is a surname and a masculine given name.

== Given name ==
- Aftab Ahmad Khan Sherpao (born 1944), Pakistani politician
- Aftab Ahmed, several people
- Aftab Ali (1907–1972), British Asian politician
- Aftab Baloch (1953–2022), former Pakistani cricketer
- Aftab Gul (born 1946), former Pakistani cricketer
- Aftab Habib (born 1972), English cricketer
- Aftab Jawaid, former squash player from Pakistan
- Aftab Ahmad Khan (1923–2011), Pakistan Army Infantry officer
- Aftab Ahmed Khan (1940–2022), Indian politician
- Aftab Shaban Mirani (1940–2025), Pakistani politician
- Aftab Pureval (born 1982), American politician
- Aftab Sachak (born 1952), Afghan-born British actor
- Aftab Iqbal Shamim (1933–2024), Urdu poet
- Aftab Shamshudeen (born 1977), Guyanese-born cricketer

== Surname ==
- Arooj Aftab (born 1985), Pakistani-American singer, composer, and producer

== Compound names ==
- Aftabuddin (lit. 'sunshine of the faith')
