= Sindhi names =

Sindhi given names are the first names in the Sindhi language used among Sindhi people.

== Naming convention ==
A majority of Sindhis are Muslim, and a minority are Hindu. Their given names are generally of Arabic, Persian, Turkic and Indian origin. The full name have first name, middle name (usually of the father name or a Religious personality) and last name (surname / caste), some also use titles at beginning of first names.

== List of Sindhi given names ==
=== Masculine names ===
Names	Meaning
Allah Dino	The gift of God
Allah Bachayo	Blessed by God
Allah Rakhio	Blessed by God
Allah Wasayo	Blessed by God
Ailaz	Request
Achar	
Allan	
Akash	Sky
Aachhu	
Aqqan	
Amb	Mango
Bachal	
Bux / Baksh	To Bestow
Buxan / Bakshan	
Buxal / Bukshal	
Bhooral	Fair Complexion
Bhooro	Fair
Bhaag	Luck
Baajh	Mercy
Chanesar	
Chhuto	
Chhutal	
Dodo/Doda	
Dadlo	Deary, Apple Of The Eye
Dadan	
Dholan	Beloved
Dhani Bux	
Dilair	Brave
Eidan	
Fazal Bux	
Gul	Flower
Hiro / Heero	Diamond
Hallar	
Hubdar	
Hamir	
Hajan	
Haanv	Heart
Imam Bux	
Juman	
Jinsar	
Jurial	
Janar	
Jass	Strength, Victory
Jaro	
Juno	
Khamiso	
Kinayat	Sufficiency, Competency
Khudan	
Kadan	
Kiyas	Sympathy, Empathy
Koral	
Long	
Lallan	
Lal Bux	
Mor	Peacock
Man	Heart
Mithu	
Maivo	Fruit
Mithal	
Misri	Crystallized Sugar
Mehran	
Manak	Beads, Gems
Manjhi	
Malhar	
Malook	Handsome
Mocharo	Good looking, Handsome
Mola Bux	God's Gift
Manthar	
Neenh	Love
Nihan	Of the Love
Nirwar	Sacrifice
Naley Chango	The one with beautiful name
Nabi Bux	
Pir Buksh	
Peeral	
Punhu	
Punhal	
Pandhi	
Pyaral	Beloved
Qurb	Love, to Thank
Raban	
Rab Dino	The gift of God
Rasool Bux	
Rawal	
Sachal	Honest
Sachar	Honest
Sawan	Monsoon
Sarang	
Sarvech	
Sodho	
Sodhal	
Sojhro	Light
Sanwal	
Sarwan	
Saindad	
Sindhyar	
Soomaar	
Sumar	
Sammar	Fruits
Sujag	Awareness, Awaken
Sijh	Sun
Sudheer	
Sadoro	
Sobharo	
Sabhago	Lucky, Fortunate
Shaman	
Shihan	Of the lions
Sajjan	Kind, Merciful
Saam	Protection
Sanjar	
Sagar	Sea, Ocean
Sagho	Brave
Suhan	
Saheth / Saaeth	Luck
Tamachi	
Urs	
Ukeer	Longing
Wakhan / Vakhan	Praise, commendation
Wallan	
Zorawar	Brave, Strong

=== Feminine names ===
Name	Meaning
Allah Dini	The gift of God
Allah Rakhi	Blessed by God
Allah Bachai	Blessed by God
Allah Wasai	Blessed by God
Apahara	Fairy
Ameeran	Wealthy
Asoodi	Wealthy
Aajiyan	To Welcome
Aika	Unity
Aas	Hope
Aasra	Hope
Aamy	
Baakh	
Bhaag	Luck
Baajh	Mercy
Bhoori	Fair complexion
Bachul	
Bhaggi	Lucky one
Bhagbhari	Lucky one
Chandroki	Moonlight
Gulan	Flowers
Guddi	Doll
Ghurj	Demand, Need
Heer	A cold wind
Hauri	Light
Hoori	Fairy
Hooray	Fairy
Hawa	Air, Wind
Koonj	
Koonjal	
Kanwal	Lotus, Lilly
Keenjhar	Name of a lake
Khairan	
Kahal	Mercy
Lal	Beloved
Lali	Redness
Lalai	Redness
Lilan	
Murk	Smile
Marvi	
Momal	
Moran	
Malookan	Beautiful, Pretty
Mochari	Good looking, Beautiful
Mihogi / Mehogi	Raininess, Rainy weather
Maana	Meaning
Maak	Dew
Noori	Light
Nirmal	Pure, Clean
Nibaar	Pure
Pirah	
Pirbhat	Light of dawn, Morning
Poonam	Full moon
Paras	
Popri	
Qurbaiti	
Rani	Queen
Sunha / Soonh	Beauty
Sunhni	Beautiful
Sunhari	
Surhan	Fragrance
Sassui	True, Moon
Sorath	
Sumal	
Sindhu	Indus river
Sindhiya	
Sanieh	Wisdom
Sadori	
Saanjh	
Sanjha	
Sobh	
Saar	Remembrance
Sagh	Strength, Power, Ability
Sikk	
Seema	Boundary, Limit
Sitara	Star
Sulachhani	
Sambara	
Suljhar	
Sabhagi	Lucky, Fortunate
Sammar	Fruits
Surahi	
Sippy	Seashell
Sodhi	
Satabi	
Ukeer	Longing
Ujana	Brightnes, Light
Varkha	Rain, Shower
Wengas	

== See also ==
- Pakistani name
