= Persian and Urdu =

Relationship between the Persian and Urdu languages

The Persian and Urdu languages have had an intricate relationship throughout the history of the latter. Persian historically played a significant role in the formation and development of the modern Urdu in South Asia, and today acts as its prestige language.

Modern Persian was brought to the Indian subcontinent by rulers of Turko-Persian origin from Central Asia during the region's medieval period. The large effect of Persian on Urdu is due to its historical status as an official and literary language under many of these rulers, as well as its status as a lingua franca during their reign over the subcontinent.

Persian was displaced by Urdu in North India during the British colonial rule in India, though it remains in use in its native Iran, Afghanistan (known as Dari) and Tajikistan (as Tajik). Urdu is currently the official language and lingua franca of Pakistan, and an officially recognized language for North Indian Muslims in the republic of India.

== Overview ==
Hindustani (sometimes called Hindi–Urdu) is a colloquial pluricentric language and lingua franca of Pakistan and the Hindi Belt of India. It forms a dialect continuum (diglossia) between its two formal registers: the highly Persianized (and Arabized) Urdu, and the de-Persianized, de-Arabized, Sanskritized Hindi. Urdu uses a modification of the Persian alphabet, whereas Hindi uses Devanagari. Hindustani in its common form is often referred to as Urdu or Hindi, depending on the background of the speaker/institution. This situation is fraught with sociopolitical factors and controversies, in which Persian and Arabic play a part. The common linguistic position is to use Urdu as the term for the register, and Hindustani for the spoken, common pluricentric language.

Hindustani bears significant influence from Persian; in its common form, it already incorporates many long-assimilated words and phrases from Persian, which it shares with speakers across national borders. As the register Urdu, it bears the most Persian influence of any variety in the subcontinent, featuring further vocabulary, grammar, and pronunciation influences. The latter form of the language is associated with formal contexts and prestige, and is deployed as the medium of written communication, education, and media in Pakistan. This happens in more restricted settings in India, where the Sanskritised register of Hindi is more widely used for these purposes; Urdu appears in the social contexts and institutions associated with Indian Muslims, as well as in literary circles. It is one of India's 22 scheduled languages, and is given official status in multiple Indian states.

== History ==
Persian and Urdu are closely related languages. Persian is classified as a western Iranian language, whereas Urdu is a central Indo-Aryan language (mediated by Shauraseni Prakrit). They fall under the larger grouping of the Indo-Iranian languages, and hence share some linguistic features due to common descent.

However, the majority of influence from Persian is direct, through a process often called Persianization. Following the Turko-Persian conquest of South Asia by the Ghaznavids, Persian was introduced into the Indian subcontinent, which led to the formation of what later became known as "Urdu" centuries later, initially using the name Lashkari or Lashkari Zaban. The Delhi dialect of Old Hindi and other dialects of South Asia received a large influx of Persian, Chagatai and Arabic vocabulary. The subsequent Delhi Sultanate gave way for a further continuation of this. The basis in general for the introduction of the Persian language into the subcontinent was set, from its earliest days, by Afghan and various Persianate dynasties from Central Asia of Turkic origin.

This lexically diverse register of language, which emerged in the northern Indian subcontinent, was commonly called Zaban-i-Urdu-i-Mu'alla ('language of the orda - court'). From this title the poet Mashafi coined the name "Urdu".

Unlike Persian, which is an Iranian language, Urdu is an Indo-Aryan language, written in the modified Perso-Arabic script; Urdu has a Indo-Aryan vocabulary base derived from Sanskrit and Prakrit, with specialized vocabulary being borrowed from Persian, Arabic and Turkic languages. Some grammatical elements peculiar to Persian, such as the enclitic ezāfe and the use of pen-names, were readily absorbed into Urdu literature both in the religious and secular spheres.

Hindustani gained distinction in literary and cultural spheres in South Asia because of its role as a lingua franca in the Indian subcontinent as a result of the large number of speakers the language has, both as a first and second language. A prominent crossover writer was Amir Khusrau, an Indian poet whose Persian and Old Hindi (such as Kauravi and Braj Bhasha) couplets are to this day read in South Asia. Muhammad Iqbal, the national poet of Pakistan, was also a prominent South Asian writer who wrote in both Persian and Urdu; which in later life he reverted back to Persian exclusively.

== Sample comparison ==
The following is a comparison between Iranian Persian and formal Urdu, using text from Article 1 of the Universal Declaration of Human Rights. Urdu is shown in the Nastaliq calligraphic hand, contrary to Iranian Persian.

Iranian Persian	تمام افراد بشر آزاد به دنیا می‌آیند و از لحاظ حیثیت و حقوق با هم برابرند، همه دارای عقل و وجدان می‌باشند و باید نسبت به یکدیگر با روح برادری رفتار کنند.
Transliteration	Tamâm-e afrâd-e bašar âzâd be donyâ miâyand va az lehâz-e heysiyat-o hoquq bâ ham barâbar-and. Hame dârâ-ye ʻaql-o vejdân mi-bâšand va bâyad nesbat be yekdigar bâ ruh-e barâdari raftâr konand.
Transcription (IPA)	tæmæme æfrɒːde bæʃær ɒːzɒːd be donjɒː miːɒːjænd væ æz lehɒːze hejsijæto hoɢuːɢ bɒː hæm bærɒːbærænd ‖ hæme dɒːrɒːje ʔæɢlo vedʒdɒːn miːbɒːʃænd væ bɒːjæd nesbæt be jekdijær bɒː ruːhe bærɒːdæriː ræftɒːɾ konænd ‖
English translation	All human beings are born free and equal in dignity and rights. They are endowed with reason and conscience and should act towards one another in a spirit of brotherhood.
Standard Urdu	دفعہ ١: تمام اِنسان آزاد اور حُقوق و عِزت کے اعتبار سے برابر پَیدا ہُوئے ہَیں۔ انہیں ضمِیر اور عقل ودِیعت ہوئی ہَیں۔ اِس لئے انہیں ایک دُوسرے کے ساتھ بھائی چارے کا سُلُوک کرنا چاہئے۔
Transliteration (ISO 15919)	Dafʻa 1: Tamām insān āzād aur ḥuqūq-ō ʻizzat kē iʻtibār sē barābar paidā hu’ē haĩ. Unhē̃ żamīr aur ʻaql wadīʻat hu’ī haĩ. Isli’ē unhē̃ ēk dūsrē kē sāth bhā’ī cārē kā sulūk karnā cāhi’ē.
Transcription (IPA)	dəfʔaː eːk təmaːm ɪnsaːn aːzaːd ɔːɾ hʊquːqoː ʔizːət keː ɪʔtɪbaːɾ seː bəɾaːbəɾ pɛːdaː hʊeː hɛ̃ː ‖ ʊnʱẽː zəmiːɾ ɔːɾ ʔəql ʋədiːʔət hʊiː hɛ̃ː ‖ ɪslɪeː ʊnʱẽː eːk duːsɾeː keː saːtʰ bʱaːiːtʃaːɾeː kaː sʊluːk kəɾnaː tʃaːhɪeː ‖
English translation	Article 1—All human beings are born free and equal in dignity and rights. They are endowed with reason and conscience. Therefore, they should act towards one another in a spirit of brotherhood.

== See also ==
- Persian language in the Indian subcontinent
- Qaumi Taranah, the national anthem of Pakistan composed entirely in Persian except for the word kā
- Indo-Iranian languages, a branch of the Indo-European language family
- History of Hindustani
