= Karachi Education Board cricket team =

The Karachi Education Board cricket team was a first-class cricket team based in Karachi, Pakistan. The team played a single first-class match in the Ayub Trophy in November 1964 against Hyderabad at the National Stadium, Karachi. The team won the toss and batted first, making 253 all out, during which Akhtar Sadiq top–scored with 53. Hyderabad were then dismissed for 255 in their first-innings, with Vakil Tatari claiming the best bowling figures with 4/65. Responding in their second-innings, the team made 129/4 declared, with Aftab Ahmed top-scoring in the innings with 60. Hyderabad then reached 61/5 in their second-innings, with Tatari and Sadiq each taking two wickets. At this point the match was declared a draw. Of the starting eleven, only Tariq Javed would go on to play international cricket, with him playing in One Day Internationals for Canada.
