= Aftabuddin Alam =

Indian cricketer (born 1993)

Personal information
- Born: 17 November 1993 (age 32); Jaipur, Rajasthan
- Batting: Right-handed
- Bowling: Right-arm offbreak

Domestic team information
- Years: Team
- 2015: Rajasthan cricket team
- Source: ESPNcricinfo, 8 June 2018

Aftabuddin Alam (born 17 November 1993) is an Indian cricketer. He played T20 for the Rajasthan cricket team in 2015.
