= Aftab Ahmed (1950s Peshawar cricketer) =

Pakistani cricketer

Personal information
- Full name: Aftab Ahmed
- Role: Batsman

Domestic team information
- Years: Team
- 1956–1957: Peshawar

Career statistics
Competition	FC
Matches	5
Runs scored	54
Batting average	7.71
100s/50s	0/0
Top score	33
Catches/stumpings	0/-
- Source: CricketArchive, 16 February 2013

Aftab Ahmed (date of birth unknown) was a Pakistani cricketer. Primarily a batsman, all of Aftab's matches at first-class level came for Peshawar, during the 1956–57 and 1957–58 seasons of the Quaid-e-Azam Trophy. He made his debut for the team in December 1956, against Punjab at the Peshawar Club Ground, a match which Peshawar lost by an innings and 169 runs after Fazal Mahmood took 8/21 in the team's first innings. Aftab's batting post was irregular; in his first match, he opened the batting, but in later matches, he batted as low as tenth. He played one further match during the 1956–57 season, and three the following season, but rarely made more than a single-digit score. His highest score was an innings of 33 runs against Railways in October 1957. Having scored only 51 runs from his eight innings for Peshawar, at an average of 7.71, Aftab played no further matches at first-class level.
