= Aftab Ahmed (photojournalist) =

Bangladeshi photojournalist

- আফতাব আহমেদ
- Born: 1934/1935; Mohipur Village, Rangpur District, Bengal, British India
- Died: December 25, 2013 (aged 79); Dhaka, Bangladesh
- Resting place: Mirpur, Graveyard
- Occupation: Photojournalist
- Employer: The Daily Ittefaq
- Awards: Ekushey Padak (2006)

Aftab Ahmed (c. 1934 – 25 December 2013) was a Bangladeshi photojournalist. He served as chief photographer of Bengali newspaper The Daily Ittefaq. He was awarded Ekushey Padak in 2006 by the Government of Bangladesh.

== Career ==
Ahmed started his career as photojournalist in The Daily Ittefaq in 1962. He took photographs during the Liberation War of Bangladesh in 1971.

== Personal life ==
Ahmed was married to Momtaz begum (died 29 June 2010). They had one son Monowar Ahmed and one daughter Afroz Ahmed.

== Death ==
On 24 December 2013 Ahmed was found dead at his house in West Rampura region in Dhaka. According to the police, his hands and legs were tied up and a gag was wrapped around his mouth when his body was found. Dhaka Medical College morgue concluded his death was caused by strangulation in the post-mortem report. On 27 March 2017, 5 people were sentenced to death for his murder.
