= Aftab Ahmed (Public Works Department cricketer) =

Pakistani cricketer (born 1983)

Personal information
- Full name: Aftab Ahmed Khan
- Born: 14 September 1983 (age 43); Karachi, Sindh, Pakistan
- Batting: Right-handed
- Bowling: Right-arm off-break
- Role: Bowler

Domestic team information
- Years: Team
- 2002–2003: Public Works Department

Career statistics
Competition	FC	LA
Matches	2	4
Runs scored	29	31
Batting average	9.66	31.00
100s/50s	0/0	0/0
Top score	15	21*
Balls bowled	294	198
Wickets	5	3
Bowling average	34.60	52.00
5 wickets in innings	0	0
10 wickets in match	0	n/a
Best bowling	4/13	2/32
Catches/stumpings	1/-	2/-
- Source: CricketArchive, 17 February 2013

Aftab Ahmed (born 14 September 1983) is a former Pakistani cricketer. From Karachi, Sindh, Aftab played for Karachi at under-19 level from the 2000–01 season onwards, making his debut at the age of 16. He went on to make his first-class debut during the 2002–03 season, playing twice for the Public Works Department in the Quaid-e-Azam Trophy. His List A debut came later in the season, when he played four matches for the same team in the limited-overs National Bank of Pakistan Patron's Cup. A right-arm off spinner, Aftab's best bowling figures at first-class level came on debut, when he took 4/13 in Dadu's second innings to help the Public Works Department win by 97 runs. Despite being only 20 years old during his debut season, the 2002–03 season was his only season at a major level, although he did continue to play inter-district matches for local teams until the late 2000s.
