= Abu-al-Faraj Runi =

Persian poet

Abul Faraj al-Runi (Persian: ابوالفرج رونی), was an 11th-century Persian court poet who was born in Lahore and flourished during Ghaznavid period. A contemporary of Masud Sa'ad Salman, he died sometimes after 1099.

== See also ==
- List of Persian poets and authors
