= Zorawar (given name) =

Zorawar (زوراور) is a Persian name that means forceful. It can be also be spelled as ‘Zoravar.’ The name 'Zorawar' originates from the ancient Persian language. It is derived from the Persian word 'zor' which means 'powerful' or 'strong', and 'avar' which means 'warrior' or 'leader'. Therefore, 'Zorawar' can be translated to mean 'powerful warrior' or 'strong leader'.

The etymology of the name 'Zorawar' can be traced back to ancient Persia. The Persian language, is an Indo-European language that has been spoken for thousands of years. The roots of the name 'Zorawar' lie in the ancient Persian culture, where warriors and leaders were highly revered. The combination of 'zor' and 'avar' in the name 'Zoravar' creates a sense of strength and authority.

The name 'Zorawar' holds great cultural significance in Persian and Indo-Iranian cultures. In these cultures, warriors and leaders played a crucial role in society, and the name 'Zorawar' embodies the qualities associated with these roles.

It is borrowed by the Punjabi (ਜ਼ੋਰਾਵਰ) and Sindhi languages. The Punjabi language is heavily influenced by the Persian language.

== Notable bearers ==
- Zorawar Chand Bakhshi, Indian Army's most decorated general
- Zorawar Kalra, Indian restaurateur
- Zorawar Singh, third son of Guru Gobind Singh
- Zorawar Singh Kahluria, general of the Sikh Empire
- Zoravar Andranik, Armenian military commander
