= Masud Sa'd Salman =

Persian poet

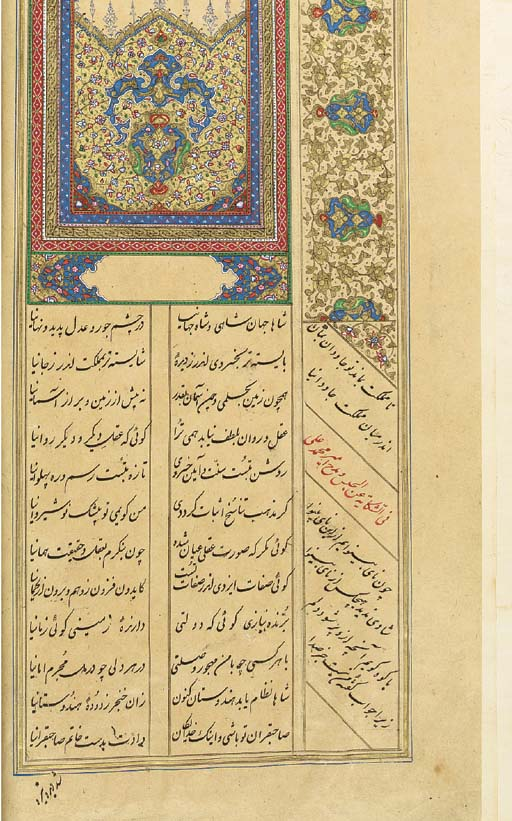
Manuscript of Masud Sa'd Salman's divan. Copy created in Qajar Iran on the order of Hasan Ali Khan Garrusi (Amir Nezam), dated January 1889

Mas'ud-i Sa'd-i Salmān (Persian: مسعود سعد سلمان) was an 11th-century Persian poet of the Ghaznavid empire who is known as the prisoner poet. He lived from c. 1046 to 1121.

== Early life ==
He was born in 1046 in Lahore to wealthy parents from Hamadan, present-day Iran. His father Sa'd bin Salman accompanied the Ghaznian Prince Majdûd under the Sultan Mahmûd's orders to garrison Lahore. Mas'ud was born there and he was highly learned in astrology, hippology, calligraphy, literature and also in Arabic and Indian languages.

His first work of note was as a panegyrist in the retinue of Sultan Ibrâhîm's son Sayf al-Dawla Mahmûd, whose appointment to governor-general of India in 1076 Mas'ud marked with a qasideh.

== In prison ==
In 1085, he was imprisoned, in the fortress of Nay, for his complicity with Sultan Ibrâhîm's son, Mahmud. He was released by the sultan's successor Mas‘ûd III in 1096, who appointed him royal librarian. He came under the patronage of Abu Nasr Farsi, deputy governor of India, and was appointed governor of Jallandar. Two years later, continued political changes resulted in a prison stay of 8 years, with his release in 1106. The last years of his life was spent in high favor, serving four consecutive sultans as librarian and panegyrist.

== Poetry ==
He is known as a great Persian poet and is particularly notable for his use of conventional language and personal tone.

Most of his works are written in the qasideh form, in which he followed Unsuri. He has some poems in other styles such as quatrain and qet'eh.

During one of his prison stays, he wrote the Tristia, a celebrated work of Persian poetry. He had relationships with some of the Persian poets, including Othman Mokhtari, Abu-al-Faraj Runi, and Sanai.

One of his famous qasidehs about the prison named ای وائی امید ہائے بسیارم:

شخصي به هزار غم گرفتارم  در هر نفسي بجان رسد كارم

- I am fallen person in a thousand sorrows
- In each breath my life's looking in end

بي ذلت و بي گناه محبوسم  بي علت و بي سبب گرفتارم

- with no sin I am prisoner
- with no reason fallen in trouble

خورده قسم اختران به پاداشم  بسته كمر آسمان به پيكارم

- stars have sworn to hurt me
- the sky has come to fight with me

امروز به غم فزونترم از دي  امسال به نقد كمتر از پارم

- today in pains I'm higher than the yesterday
- this year my soul's lesser than last year

ياران گزيده داشتم روزی  امروز چه شد كه نيست كس يارم؟

- I had many selected friends
- what has become no one's remain

هر نيمه شب آسمان ستوه آيد  از ناله سخت و گريه ي زارم

- every night the sky's made sad
- with my painful sadness crying

محبوس چرا شدم نمي دانم   دانم كه نه دزدم و نه عيارم

- I fell in jail, why? I don't know
- I just know: I'm not still nor wicked

بسيار اميد بود بر طبعم  اي واي اميدهای بسيارم

- to much desires I had before
- oh alas! where is my lost desires

Couplet:

Transliteration:

Gardou be ranj o dard mara koshteh bud agar!
Peyvand e omr e man ne shodey nazm e janfezay!

Translation:
Had this sky (fate) got me killed with grief and pain (in my imprisoned state)!
This patch (of garment) of my life would not have yielded life giving poetry!

== See also ==
- List of Persian poets and authors
- List of people from Lahore
- Persian literature
