= 1953–54 Quaid-e-Azam Trophy =

- Dates: 20 November 1953 – 25 January 1954
- Administrator: Board of Control for Cricket in Pakistan
- Cricket format: First-class (three-day)
- Tournament format: Knockout
- Champions: Bahawalpur (1st title)
- Participants: 7
- Matches: 6
- Most runs: Hanif Mohammad (339)
- Most wickets: Zulfiqar Ahmed (16)

The 1953–54 season of the Quaid-i-Azam Trophy was the first edition of the tournament, and the inaugural first-class cricket competition played in Pakistan following its independence in 1947. One of the tournament's purposes was to help determine the Pakistan national side's squad for its tour of England in 1954.

The tournament was played as a knockout competition between seven teams representing both regions and government departments. Punjab received a bye through to the semi-finals to compensate for the odd number of teams. The final, played in Karachi, was contested between Punjab and Bahawalpur, with Bahawalpur winning by eight wickets. Two Bahawalpur players, Hanif Mohammad and Fazal Mahmood (both future Pakistan captains), led the competition in runs and wickets, respectively.

== Teams ==
Five teams (Bahawalpur, Combined Services, Karachi, North-West Frontier Province, and Railways) made their first-class debuts in the tournament.

Team	Captain(s)	Most runs	Most wickets
Bahawalpur	Khan Mohammad	Hanif Mohammad (339)	Zulfiqar Ahmed (16)
Combined Services	Abdul Kardar	Ebbu Ghazali (257)	Ebbu Ghazali (7)
Karachi	Asghar Ali	Behram Irani (56)	Badaruddin Malik (6)
North-West Frontier Province	Jaseem Khan	Aminuddin (60)	Jaseem Khan (5)
Punjab	Mohammad Saeed	Shakoor Ahmed (190)	Fazal Mahmood (14)
Railways	Masood Salahuddin (1 match); Mohammad Nissar (1 match)	Aslam Khokhar (138)	Mohammad Amin (13)
Sind	Pir Pagaro	Ikram Elahi (76)	Anwar Elahi (4)

== Results ==
Preliminary Round
4–6 December 1953; Aga Khan Gymkhana Ground, Karachi
Karachi	191 & 71/5
Combined Services	407 & 249/3d
20–22 November 1953; Bahawal Stadium, Bahawalpur
Bahawalpur	252 & 69/1
Sind	144 & 176
20–22 November 1953; Peshawar Club Ground, Peshawar
North-West Frontier Province	90 & 271
Railways	185 & 178/4

Semi-finals
11–13 December 1953; Aga Khan Gymkhana Ground, Karachi
Combined Services	405
Bahawalpur	424/7
14–16 December 1953; Aitchison College Ground, Lahore
Punjab	197 & 277
Railways	169 & 160

Final
23–25 January 1954; Karachi Goan Association Ground, Karachi
Bahawalpur	244 & 156/2
Punjab	249 & 147

=== Preliminary round ===
20–22 November 1953	Sind	v	Bahawalpur	Bahawalpur won by 9 wickets
Scorecard	144 all out (60.1 overs); Mohammad Munaf 36; Zulfiqar Ahmed 5/54 (25 overs)		252 all out (86.1 overs); Hanif Mohammad 147*; Anwar Elahi 4/64 (14 overs)	Bahawal Stadium, Bahawalpur; Umpires: Khadim Hussain & Shujauddin
Scorecard	176 (56.5 overs); Ikram Elahi 63; Zulfiqar Ahmed 4/49 (16.5 overs)		69/1 (21.1 overs); Wazir Mohammad 31*; Ikram Elahi 1/6 (5 overs)	Bahawal Stadium, Bahawalpur; Umpires: Khadim Hussain & Shujauddin
Sind won the toss and elected to bat.

20–22 November 1953	North-West Frontier Province	v	Railways	Railways won by 6 wickets
Scorecard	90 all out (46.3 overs); Fazal Rahim 24; Masood Salahuddin 4/22 (11 overs)		185 all out (77 overs); Mahmood Ahmed 59; Jaseem Khan 4/22 (19 overs)	Peshawar Club Ground, Peshawar; Umpires: M. Malik & Munawar Hussain
Scorecard	271 all out (100.1 overs); Aminuddin 49; Masood Salahuddin 4/71 (22 overs)		178/4 (64 overs); Aslam Khokhar 40*; Sajjad Ahmed 2/62 (21 overs)	Peshawar Club Ground, Peshawar; Umpires: M. Malik & Munawar Hussain
Railways won the toss and elected to field.

4–6 December 1953	Combined Services	v	Karachi	Match drawn
Scorecard	407 all out (103.3 overs); Ebbu Ghazali 160; Badaruddin Malik 6/131 (39 overs)		191 all out (81.3 overs); Behram Irani 56; Shujauddin 4/81 (38 overs)	Aga Khan Gymkhana Ground, Karachi; Umpires: Ahmed Khan & Jacob Harris
Scorecard	249/3 dec. (68 overs); Abdur Rehman 89; Raees Mohammad 2/77 (19 overs)		71/5 (19 overs); Abdul Wahab 42; Anwar Saeed 2/24 (4 overs)	Aga Khan Gymkhana Ground, Karachi; Umpires: Ahmed Khan & Jacob Harris
Combined Services won the toss and elected to bat.; Combined Services advanced to the semi-finals on first innings.

=== Semi-finals ===
4–6 December 1953	Combined Services	v	Bahawalpur	Match drawn
Scorecard	405 all out (111.2 overs); Imtiaz Ahmed 102; Amir Elahi 3/54 (14.2 overs)		424/7 (151 overs); Hanif Mohammad 118; Ebbu Ghazali 4/161 (55 overs)	Aga Khan Gymkhana Ground, Karachi; Umpires: Jacob Harris & Shujauddin
Combined Services won the toss and elected to bat.; Bahawalpur advanced to the final on first innings.

14–16 December 1953	Punjab	v	Railways	Punjab won by 145 runs
Scorecard	197 all out (65.3 overs); Mohammad Saeed 48; Mohammad Amin 5/57 (22.3 overs)		169 (59.2 overs); Aslam Khokhar 69; Fazal Mahmood 4/67 (30 overs)	Aitchison College Ground, Lahore; Umpires: Hassan Shah & Tawakkal Majeed
Scorecard	277 all out (102.4 overs); Shakoor Ahmed 102; Asghar Ali 5/61 (29.4 overs)		160 all out (41 overs); Gulzar Mir 52; Fazal Mahmood 3/30 (11 overs)	Aitchison College Ground, Lahore; Umpires: Hassan Shah & Tawakkal Majeed
Punjab won the toss and elected to bat.

=== Final ===
23–25 January 1954
Scorecard

Punjab	v	Bahawalpur
249 all out (76.3 overs); Shujauddin Butt 69*; Khan Mohammad 4/64 (19 overs)		244 all out (65.3 overs); Maqsood Ahmed 64; Fazal Mahmood 5/73 (30 overs)
147 all out (69 overs); Shakoor Ahmed 42; Zulfiqar Ahmed 4/35 (14 overs)		156/2 (42.3 overs); Alimuddin 65*; Fazal Mahmood 2/45 (17 overs)

Bahawalpur won by 8 wickets
Goan Association Ground, Karachi
Umpires: Naoomal Jeoomal & Qamaruddin Butt

- Punjab won the toss and elected to bat.

== Statistics ==
=== Most runs ===
The top five runscorers are included in this table, listed by runs scored and then by batting average.

Player	Team	Runs	Inns	Avg	Highest	100s	50s
Hanif Mohammad	Bahawalpur	339	5	113.00	147*	2	0
Ebbu Ghazali	Combined Services	257	3	85.66	160	1	1
Abdur Rehman	Combined Services	213	3	71.00	89	0	2
Shakoor Ahmed	Punjab	190	4	47.50	102	1	0
Maqsood Ahmed	Bahawalpur	153	2	76.50	89	0	2

=== Most wickets ===
The top five wicket-takers are listed in this table, listed by wickets taken and then by bowling average.

Player	Team	Overs	Wkts	Ave	5/i	10/m	BBI
Zulfiqar Ahmed	Bahawalpur	94.5	16	15.56	1	0	5/54
Fazal Mahmood	Punjab	88.0	14	15.35	1	0	5/73
Mohammad Amin	Railways	88.4	13	18.15	1	0	5/57
Asghar Ali	Railways	74.1	12	14.25	1	0	5/61
Khan Mohammad	Bahawalpur	75.0	11	16.20	0	0	4/64
