= List of Punjab University cricketers =

This is a list of cricketers who have played matches for the Punjab University cricket team.

== Notable players ==
- Aftab Ahmed
- Ijaz Ahmed
- Imtiaz Ahmed
- Saeed Ahmed
- Shafiq Ahmed
- Shakoor Ahmed
- Waqar Ahmed
- Zulfiqar Ahmed
- Israr Ali
- Saleem Altaf
- Zafar Altaf
- Asad Jahangir
- Khalid Aziz
- Ehteshamuddin
- Humayun Farkhan
- Farooq Azeem
- Khawaja Shujauddin
- Aftab Gul
- Waqar Hasan
- Mahmood Hussain
- Majid Khan
- Maqsood Ahmed
- Afzal Masood
- Asif Masood
- Masood Iqbal
- Khan Mohammad
- Nazar Mohammad
- Sarfraz Nawaz
- Mohammad Nazir
- Wasim Raja
- Sultan Rana
- Kamran Rasheed
- Fazal-ur-Rehman
- Shujauddin Butt
- Talat Ali
- Gulraiz Wali
- Agha Zahid
