= Pakistani cricket team in Ceylon in 1948–49 =

International cricket tour

The Pakistan national cricket team toured Ceylon from mid-March to mid-April 1949 and played four matches including two internationals against the Ceylon national team. As neither country had yet achieved Test status, the internationals are classified as first-class matches. Both games were played at Colombo Oval (now Paikiasothy Saravanamuttu Stadium) in Colombo and Pakistan won them both: the first by an innings and 192 runs; the second by 10 wickets. These two matches were the first four-day internationals played in Ceylon. Pakistan were captained by Mohammed Saeed and Ceylon by Derrick de Saram.

== The team ==
- Mohammed Saeed (captain)
- Abdur Rehman
- Alimuddin
- Anwar Hussain
- Aslam Khokhar
- Usuf Chippa
- Fazal Mahmood
- Imtiaz Ahmed
- Behram Irani
- Khan Mohammad
- Maqsood Ahmed
- Mohammad Amin
- Murawwat Hussain
- Nazar Mohammad
- Shujauddin Butt

== Matches ==
The first two matches were not first-class.

- Ceylon XI v Pakistanis, unknown ground, Colombo, 23, 24 March 1949. Ceylon XI 149 and 181 for 9 declared; Pakistanis 231 and 84 for 1. Match drawn.
- Sinhalese Sports Club v Pakistanis, Viharamahadevi Park, Colombo, 26, 27, 28 March 1949. Sinhalese Sports Club 344 and 97 for 2 declared; Pakistanis 218 and 192 for 5. Match drawn.
- Ceylon v Pakistan, Colombo Oval, Colombo, 1, 2, 3 April 1949. Ceylon 112 and 95; Pakistan 399. Pakistan won by an innings and 192 runs.

The highest scorer on either side was the Pakistani captain, Mohammed Saeed, who made 93 in the first innings. The best bowling figures were taken by Ceylon's Bertie Wijesinha, who took 5 for 105.

- Ceylon v Pakistan, Colombo Oval, Colombo, 8, 9, 10, 11 April 1949. Ceylon 311 and 210; Pakistan 474 for 9 declared and 48 for 0. Pakistan won by 10 wickets.

Ceylon's captain Derrick de Saram (118) and C. I. Gunasekera (120) added 181 for the fifth wicket in Ceylon's first innings. In reply, Nazar Mohammad (170) and Murawwat Hussain (164) added 269 for the second wicket. Khan Mohammad (5 for 72 in Ceylon's first innings) took Pakistan's first international five-wicket haul.
