= Shakoor Ahmed =

Pakistani cricketer (born 1928)

Personal information
- Full name: Shakoor Ahmed Qureshi
- Born: 15 September 1928; Kampala, Uganda
- Batting: Right-handed
- Role: Wicketkeeper-batsman

Domestic team information
- Years: Team
- 1947-48 to 1951-52: Punjab University
- 1951-52 to 1957-58: Punjab
- 1958-59: Multan
- 1959-60 to 1967-68: Lahore

Career statistics
Competition	First-class
Matches	55
Runs scored	3130
Batting average	37.26
100s/50s	8/14
Top score	280
Balls bowled	12
Wickets	0
Bowling average	–
5 wickets in innings	–
10 wickets in match	–
Best bowling	–
Catches/stumpings	56/17
- Source: Cricket Archive, 17 December 2014

Shakoor Ahmed Qureshi (born 15 September 1928) was a Pakistani cricketer who played first-class cricket from 1948 to 1968. He toured England in 1954 with the Pakistan team but did not play Test cricket.

A batsman who often opened, and also usually kept wicket, Shakoor Ahmed made his first-class debut in 1947-48 in the second first-class match to be played in the newly independent Pakistan, keeping wicket for Punjab University in the first of what became a regular fixture against the Punjab Governor's XI. He captained Punjab University in these matches in 1950-51 and 1951-52. He also played for Pakistan Universities in a two-day match against the touring MCC in 1951-52, scoring 104 not out in the second innings.

In his first match in the Quaid-e-Azam Trophy, the semi-final of the inaugural 1953-54 competition, he scored his first century, 102 for Punjab against Railways. He was chosen as the reserve wicket-keeper for the 1954 tour of England, but scored only 154 runs at an average of 14.00 in nine first-class matches. The wicketkeeper-batsman Imtiaz Ahmed played all four Tests. In the 1954-55 season Shakoor Ahmed scored two centuries, including 116 not out in 38 overs against North-West Frontier Province.

Ahmed also played cricket in his native Uganda and Kenya. In 1956-57 when a Kenya Asians team toured South Africa to play against non-white teams, he scored centuries in two of the three matches against the South African Non-Europeans XI. When Punjab won the Quaid-e-Azam Trophy for the first time a few months later he scored 73 and 24 in the final. He was the only player to score a century in the final in 1959-60 when Karachi beat his team, Lahore.

Ahmed made his highest score in 1964-65 when he made 280 in nine and a half hours for Lahore Greens against Railways. He captained the team in the Quaid-e-Azam Trophy final later that season; in the second innings, needing 369 to win, after Lahore Greens were 45 for 4 Ahmed made 150 not out, of an eventual total of 263.
