= Aftab Ahmed (cricketer, born 1931) =

Pakistani cricketer (born 1931)

Aftab Ahmed Gogi
Personal information
- Full name: Aftab Ahmed Gogi
- Born: 6 May 1931 (age 95); Lahore, Punjab, British India
- Batting: Right-handed
- Bowling: Right-arm off-break
- Role: Bowler

Domestic team information
- Years: Team
- 1949–1951: Punjab University
- 1953–1955: Punjab

Career statistics
Competition	FC
Matches	6
Runs scored	35
Batting average	7.00
100s/50s	0/0
Top score	12*
Balls bowled	785
Wickets	20
Bowling average	22.55
5 wickets in innings	2
10 wickets in match	1
Best bowling	6/27
Catches/stumpings	0/-
- Source: CricketArchive, 5 April 2021

Aftab Ahmed Gogi; born 6 May 1931) is a former Pakistani cricketer. He was born in Lahore. He was a right-arm off spin bowler and right-handed batsman.

Aftab made his first-class debut for Punjab University during the 1948–49 season against a Punjab Governor's XI, and played in a similar fixture two seasons later. He played for Punjab during the first two editions of the Quaid-e-Azam Trophy, in 1953–54 and 1954–55. His only other first-class appearance was for Punjab against the touring Indians in February 1955.

Aftab's first-class career best came against North-West Frontier Province in November 1954. He took a career-best 6/27 in the first innings and 5/52 in the second innings, finishing with match figures of 11/79.
