= Khadim Hussain (cricketer) =

Personal information
- Born: 1905; Lahore, Punjab Province
- Died: 23 December 1972 (aged 66–67); Karachi, Pakistan
- Batting: Right-handed
- Bowling: Right-arm medium-fast
- Role: All-rounder

Domestic team information
- Years: Team
- 1926–1930: Muslims
- 1926: Northern Punjab
- 1934: Northern India
- 1937–1938: Sind

Umpiring information
- FC umpired: 6 (1953–1957)

Career statistics
Competition	FC
Matches	17
Runs scored	311
Batting average	17.27
100s/50s	0/1
Top score	65*
Balls bowled	2,409
Wickets	49
Bowling average	21.87
5 wickets in innings	2
10 wickets in match	0
Best bowling	5/25
Catches/stumpings	19/–
- Source: CricketArchive, 26 May 2015

Khadim Hussain (1905 – 23 December 1972) was a Pakistani cricket player and umpire. His first-class playing career spanned from 1926 to 1938, with all of his matches coming prior to the partition of India in 1947. He made his first-class umpiring debut in 1953, and umpired in Pakistani domestic matches for several years afterward.

Born in Lahore in what was then British India, Khadim made his first-class playing debut in the 1926 edition of the annual Lahore Tournament, appearing for the Muslims team. Except for 1927, he played in the tournament in all years up to 1930. Other first-class appearances during that time included a match for a Northern Punjab team against a touring MCC side in November 1926. A right-handed pace-bowling all-rounder, Khadim's most notable performance in the tournament was 65 not out and 5/25 against the Hindus in 1929, both career-best figures. After 1930, he made no further first-class appearances until the 1934–35 season, when he played two matches for Northern India – one a trial match against Sind in October 1934, and one against the Army team in the inaugural edition of the Ranji Trophy.

Khadim also appeared in the 1938–39 Ranji Trophy, playing for Sind rather than Northern India. The previous season, also for Sind, he had taken his second and final five-wicket haul, 5/81 against a touring English team captained by Lord Tennyson. In the same innings, he also provided one of the first known instances of the form of dismissal later known as "Mankading" (at the time uncontroversial), running out Joe Hardstaff when he backed up too far. The 1938–39 Ranji Trophy was Khadim's last first-class tournament, but he continued playing in the annual Sind Tournament in Karachi into the early 1940s, which did not have first-class status.

In December 1953, Khadim became one of the first umpires to officiate a domestic first-class match in post-independence Pakistan, umpiring the match between Bahawalpur and Sind in the inaugural season of the Quaid-i-Azam Trophy. Along with another player-turned-umpire, Ahmed Khan, he holds the distinction of being one of the few people involved in both the first Ranji Trophy season and the first Quaid-i-Azam season, coming almost 19 years apart. Outside of his domestic duties, he umpired matches involving touring international sides during both the 1954–55 and 1955–56 seasons, when India and New Zealand toured, respectively. His final matches as a first-class umpire came in October 1957, when he officiated two Quaid-i-Azam matches in Karachi. He died in the city in December 1972.
