= Gulraiz Wali =

Pakistani cricketer

Personal information
- Born: 13 November 1943 (age 82); Sialkot, British India
- Batting: Right-handed
- Bowling: Right-arm off-spin

Domestic team information
- Years: Team
- 1963-64 to 1965-66: Lahore
- 1964-65: Punjab University
- 1967-68 to 1969-70: Bahawalpur

Career statistics
Competition	First-class
Matches	15
Runs scored	569
Batting average	27.09
100s/50s	1/2
Top score	110
Balls bowled	90
Wickets	0
Bowling average	–
5 wickets in innings	–
10 wickets in match	–
Best bowling	–
Catches/stumpings	8/–
- Source: Cricinfo, 27 January 2019

Gulraiz Wali (born 13 November 1943) is a former cricketer who played first-class cricket in Pakistan from 1964 to 1970.

== Life and career ==
Gulraiz Wali was the youngest of the four sons of Sheikh Mohammed Waliullah, a military accountant. After moving from Sialkot to Karachi, the family settled in Lahore in 1954, where Gulraiz attended Muslim High School, captaining the school cricket team.

While studying for an MA in Psychology at Government College Lahore, he played several first-class matches for Punjab University in the 1964-65 Ayub Trophy. Batting at number six he scored 110 out of a team total of 212 against Railways, taking part in a partnership of 111 for the tenth wicket.

In 1967 he was appointed as a lecturer at Sadiq Egerton College in Bahawalpur. He was also appointed to captain the Bahawalpur cricket team for the 1967-68 Ayub Trophy and the 1969-70 Quaid-i-Azam Trophy.

He moved to England in 1971 and played league cricket as a professional in Birmingham. A stroke in 1980 ended his cricket-playing days. He worked for Habib Bank in England from 1978 to 1995, then retired. He and his wife Rihana have two sons, and live in Bedfont, a south-western suburb of London.
