= Ikram Elahi =

Pakistani cricketer

Personal information
- Full name: Ikram Elahi
- Born: 3 March 1933; Quetta, British India (now in Pakistan)
- Batting: Right-handed
- Bowling: Right-arm fast-medium
- Relatives: Anwar Elahi (brother)

Domestic team information
- Years: Team
- 1953-54: Sind
- 1954-55 to 1961-62: Karachi
- 1969-70: Public Works Department

Career statistics
Competition	First-class
Matches	47
Runs scored	1058
Batting average	19.59
100s/50s	0/7
Top score	73
Balls bowled	5028
Wickets	107
Bowling average	22.42
5 wickets in innings	4
10 wickets in match	0
Best bowling	6/25
Catches/stumpings	19/–
- Source: Cricket Archive, 17 December 2014

Ikram Elahi (born 3 March 1933) is a Pakistani former cricketer who played first-class cricket from 1953 to 1970. He toured England in 1954 and the West Indies in 1957–58 with the Pakistan team but did not play Test cricket.

== 1950s ==
While he was a student at Sind Madrassah, Elahi set a record in the inter-school Rubie Shield when he scored 317 in three hours and 45 minutes. He hit 32 runs (four sixes and two fours) in one over.

A middle-order batsman and fast-medium bowler, Elahi made his first-class debut in Pakistan in 1952–53. He toured England and Wales with the Pakistan Eaglets in 1953, a tour of non-first-class matches against club teams, then played two first-class matches in the 1953–54 Pakistan season.

He was selected to tour England in 1954, having scored 174 runs at an average of 29.00 and taken five wickets at 24.60 in his three first-class matches. He played only 10 of the 30 first-class matches on the 1954 tour, scoring 193 runs at 19.30 and taking nine wickets at 25.77.

Elahi played in the Karachi team that won the Quaid-e-Azam Trophy in 1954–55, taking three wickets in the final. He took 2 for 44 and 6 for 70 when Karachi Blues beat Railways in 1956–57. In the first two matches of the 1957–58 season, playing for Karachi A, he took 2 for 16 and 6 for 25 and made 51 against Sind B, then, a week later, took 5 for 45 and 4 for 28 against Sind A.

He toured the West Indies later that season, but played only three first-class matches, making 27 runs and taking one wicket. In 1958-59 he took 4 for 48 and 3 for 10 when Karachi beat Bahawalpur by an innings and 479 runs and Hanif Mohammad scored 499. The next season, he made his highest first-class score, 73, putting on 168 for the sixth wicket with Hanif Mohammad when Karachi again beat Bahawalpur by an innings.

== 1960s ==
Elahi captained Karachi Greens in their three matches in 1961–62.

In 1962 he went to England the play as a professional for Haslingden in the Lancashire League. In 1962 he scored 364 runs at 22.75 and took 67 wickets at 14.02, in 1963 he scored 434 runs at 24.11 and took 66 wickets at 13.69, and in 1964 he scored 319 runs at 17.12 and took 72 wickets at 12.47. He then played three seasons as a professional for Bacup, also in the Lancashire League: 511 runs at 25.50 and 64 wickets at 16.04 in 1965, 735 runs at 43.23 and 45 wickets at 16.86 in 1966, and 634 runs at 32.01 and 38 wickets at 15.37 in 1967.

He played one final season in Pakistan in 1969–70, three unsuccessful matches for Public Works Department. He later returned to England to live.

His brother Anwar Elahi also played first-class cricket in Pakistan.
