= 1957–58 Quaid-e-Azam Trophy =

Pakistani cricket tournament

- Dates: 11 October 1957 – 16 March 1958
- Administrator(s): Pakistan Cricket Board
- Cricket format: First-class
- Tournament format(s): round-robin, semi-finals and final
- Champions: Bahawalpur (2nd title)
- Participants: 15
- Matches: 26
- Most runs: Iqbal Chaudhri (392)
- Most wickets: Israr Ali (35)

The 1957–58 Quaid-e-Azam Trophy was the fourth edition of the Quaid-e-Azam Trophy, the domestic first-class cricket competition in Pakistan.

Matches in the competition were played from 11 October 1957 to 16 March 1958, with the group stage matches played over three days, the semi-finals over four days, and the final over five days.

In the final, Bahawalpur defeated Karachi C by 211 runs, claiming their second title. Two Bahawalpur players, Iqbal Chaudhri and Israr Ali, led the competition in runs and wickets, respectively.

== Group stage ==
The winner of each zone, marked in bold, qualified for the semi-finals.

Central Zone
Team	Pld	W	L	WD	LD	ND	Pts
**Bahawalpur**	3	1	0	2	0	0	**7**
Karachi B	3	2	0	0	1	0	**6**
Punjab A	3	1	2	0	0	0	**3**
Quetta	3	0	2	0	1	0	**0**

North Zone
Team	Pld	W	L	WD	LD	ND	Pts
**Punjab**†	3	0	0	3	0	0	**6**
Railways	3	2	0	0	1	0	**6**
Peshawar	3	1	1	0	1	0	**3**
Punjab B	3	0	2	0	1	0	**4**

† – Punjab beat Railways on first innings in a playoff match to advance to the semi-final.

East Zone
Team	Pld	W	L	WD	LD	ND	Pts
**Dacca University**	2	2	0	0	0	0	**6**
East Pakistan A	2	1	1	0	0	0	**3**
East Pakistan B	2	0	2	0	0	0	**0**

South Zone
Team	Pld	W	L	WD	LD	ND	Pts
**Karachi C**	3	2	0	1	0	0	**8**
Karachi A	3	2	0	0	1	0	**6**
Sindh A	3	0	2	0	0	1	**1**
Sindh B	3	0	2	0	0	1	**1**

Position determined by total points; matches finishing in a draw or a tie were decided on first innings scores, with points awarded as follows:
- Win = 3 points
- Draw having led on first innings = 2 points
- Draw with no decision on first innings = 1 point
- Loss or draw having trailed on first innings = 0 points

== Finals ==
=== Semi-finals ===
8–10 February 1958
Scorecard

Bahawalpur	v	Dacca University
405 (137 overs); Israr Ali 79; Alauddin 4/29		39 (32 overs); Aziz-ur-Rehman 8* Israr Ali 6/1
		111 (66.2 overs); Ali Zafar 30; Riaz Mahmood 7/33

Bahawalpur won by an innings and 255 runs
Bahawal Stadium, Bahawalpur
Umpires: Kaleem Ahmed and Tawakkal Majeed

- Bahawalpur won the toss and elected to bat.

10–13 March 1958
Scorecard

Karachi C	v	Punjab
346 (142.2 overs); Anis-ul-Ghani 80; Humayun Zaman 4/69		165 (78.2 overs); Shakoor Ahmed 99; Antao D'Souza 5/30
173 (64.2 overs); Aftab Saeed 52; Humayun Zaman 5/32		220 (49.2 overs); Humayun Zaman 57*; Antao D'Souza 5/53

Karachi C won by 134 runs
Parsi Institute Ground, Karachi
Umpires: Daud Khan and Qamaruddin Butt

- Karachi C won the toss and elected to bat.

=== Final ===
16–20 March 1958
Scorecard

Bahawalpur	v	Karachi C
263 (110.3 overs); Shujauddin Butt 75; Saboor Ahmed 4/47		226 (85 overs); Anis-ul-Ghani 127; Shujauddin Butt 4/66
256 (111 overs); Shujauddin Butt 42; Abdul Wahab 5/93		82 (41.1 overs); Mahboob Shah 23; Israr Ali 4/18

Bahawalpur won by 211 runs
Bahawal Stadium, Bahawalpur
Umpires: Idrees Baig and Shujaddin Siddiqui

- Bahawalpur won the toss and elected to bat.

== Statistics ==
=== Most runs ===
The top five run-scorers are included in this table, listed by runs scored and then by batting average.

Player	Team	Runs	Inns	Avg	Highest	100s	50s
Iqbal Chaudhri	Bahawalpur	392	9	56.00	70	0	4
Shakoor Ahmed	Punjab	357	8	44.62	99	0	3
Alimuddin	Karachi A	317	3	158.50	131*	2	1
Mohammad Ramzan	Bahawalpur	297	8	42.42	91	0	3
Hanif Mohammad	Karachi A	269	2	269.00	146*	2	0

=== Most wickets ===
The top five wicket-takers are listed in this table, listed by wickets taken and then by bowling average.

Player	Team	Overs	Wkts	Ave	5	10	BBI
Israr Ali	Bahawalpur	231.4	35	12.45	3	1	9/58
Haseeb Ahsan	Peshawar	106.0	26	9.76	4	1	8/23
Sajid Ali	Punjab	173.3	26	14.84	0	0	4/34
Mohammad Ramzan	Bahawalpur	191.3	25	12.72	2	0	7/37
Ismail Gul	East Pakistan A	112.3	23	5.86	3	2	7/29
