= Abdur Rehman (cricketer, born 1917) =

Pakistani cricketer (1917–2000)

Personal information
- Full name: Sheikh Abdur Rehman
- Born: 15 December 1917; Amritsar, British India
- Died: 22 October 2000 (aged 82); Lahore, Pakistan
- Batting: Right-handed
- Bowling: Right-arm fast-medium
- Role: Batsman, wicketkeeper
- Relatives: Fazal-ur-Rehman (brother)

Domestic team information
- Years: Team
- 1936-37 to 1941-42: Southern Punjab
- 1953-54 to 1960-61: Combined Services

Career statistics
| Competition | First-class |
|---|---|
| Matches | 27 |
| Runs scored | 795 |
| Batting average | 17.28 |
| 100s/50s | 1/4 |
| Top score | 108 |
| Balls bowled | 390 |
| Wickets | 5 |
| Bowling average | 37.40 |
| 5 wickets in innings | 0 |
| 10 wickets in match | 0 |
| Best bowling | 1/4 |
| Catches/stumpings | 15/9 |
- Source: ESPNcricinfo, 23 November 2018

Sheikh Abdur Rehman (15 December 1917 – 22 October 2000) was a Pakistani cricketer who played first-class cricket in British India from 1937 to 1941 and in Pakistan from 1948 to 1960.

Abdur Rehman played as a wicketkeeper for Southern Punjab in the Ranji Trophy from 1936–37 to 1941–42. Later, in Pakistan, he played as a batsman and occasional pace bowler.

He scored one of the first centuries in Pakistani first-class cricket when he made 108 opening the batting for the Punjab Governor's XI against Punjab University in 1948–49. A few days later he was a member of Pakistan's first tour when they visited Ceylon, but he did not play in the international matches on the tour.

He scored 48 and 89 when Combined Services beat Karachi in the first round of the inaugural Quaid-e-Azam Trophy in 1953–54. He continued to play for Combined Services until 1960–61.

Abdur Rehman umpired three first-class matches in Pakistan between 1968 and 1971. His younger brother Fazal-ur-Rehman played Test cricket for Pakistan in 1958.
