= Sajjad Ahmed (cricketer, born 1932) =

Pakistani cricketer (born 1932)

Personal information
- Born: 14 February 1932 (age 94); Peshawar, North-West Frontier Province, British India (now Pakistan)
- Batting: Right-handed
- Bowling: Right-arm medium-pace

Domestic team information
- Years: Team
- 1953–54 to 1955–56: North-West Frontier Province
- 1956–57 to 1967–68: Peshawar

Career statistics
Competition	First-class
Matches	21
Runs scored	397
Batting average	11.67
100s/50s	0/1
Top score	54
Balls bowled	2357
Wickets	52
Bowling average	21.84
5 wickets in innings	4
10 wickets in match	2
Best bowling	9/80
Catches/stumpings	7/–
- Source: Cricket Archive, 26 September 2014

Sajjad Ahmed (born 14 February 1932) is a former cricketer who played first-class cricket in Pakistan from 1953 to 1968.

A medium-pace bowler, Sajjad Ahmed had a modest career except for two outstanding performances for Peshawar in the Quaid-e-Azam Trophy at the Peshawar Club Ground. In 1956–57, opening the bowling, he took 7 for 38 and 6 for 51 against Bahawalpur, yet Peshawar still lost by 144 runs. In 1958–59, again opening the bowling, he took 2 for 50 and 9 for 80 against Combined Services, but Peshawar lost by 185 runs. He was the third bowler to take nine wickets in an innings in the Quaid-e-Azam Trophy, after Fazal Mahmood and Israr Ali. He was selected in a President's XI against the touring West Indians later in 1958–59 in a match at the Peshawar Club Ground, but was given only three overs.
