= Anwar Elahi =

Pakistani cricketer

Personal information
- Born: Born 1936 or 1937; Karachi, British India (now in Pakistan)
- Died: 19 October 2016 (aged 79); Karachi
- Batting: Right-handed
- Bowling: Right-arm leg-spin
- Relatives: Ikram Elahi (brother)

Domestic team information
- Years: Team
- 1953-54: Sind
- 1954-55 to 1961-62: Karachi
- 1964-65 to 1969-70: Public Works Department

Career statistics
Competition	First-class
Matches	21
Runs scored	215
Batting average	9.34
100s/50s	0/0
Top score	45
Balls bowled	1215
Wickets	28
Bowling average	21.64
5 wickets in innings	0
10 wickets in match	0
Best bowling	4/64
Catches/stumpings	7/–
- Source: CricketArchive, 14 December 2016

Anwar Elahi (1936 or 1937 – 19 October 2016) was a Pakistani cricketer who played first-class cricket irregularly from 1953 to 1969.

In November 1953, while still at school, Elahi made his first-class debut for Sind in the first-ever match in the Quaid-e-Azam Trophy. He took 4 for 64 with his leg-spin, Sind's best bowling figures, in Bahawalpur's first innings. His brother Ikram Elahi top-scored for Sind with 63. Anwar Elahi was Pakistan's twelfth man against India in the fifth Test at Karachi in 1954-55.

He worked as a businessman until his death from pneumonia in October 2016.
