= Asif Ahmed (Pakistani cricketer) =

Pakistani cricketer

Personal information
- Born: 1 April 1942 (age 84); Karachi, British India
- Batting: Right-handed

Domestic team information
- Years: Team
- 1959-60: Pakistan Universities
- 1959-60 to 1960-61: Karachi University
- 1961-62 to 1970-71: Karachi
- 1963 to 1964: Oxford University
- 1971-72: Public Works Department

Career statistics
Competition	First-class
Matches	61
Runs scored	2186
Batting average	26.65
100s/50s	4/8
Top score	148
Balls bowled	114
Wickets	0
Bowling average	–
5 wickets in innings	–
10 wickets in match	–
Best bowling	–
Catches/stumpings	30/–
- Source: Cricket Archive, 13 May 2014

Asif Ahmed (born 1 April 1942) is a Pakistani former cricketer who played first-class cricket from 1960 to 1972.

== Career ==
A right-handed batsman, Ahmed made a century on his first-class debut at the age of 17, scoring 148 for Pakistan Universities against East Pakistan in the Quaid-e-Azam Trophy in 1959-60.

In 1961-62, in the final of the Quaid-e-Azam Trophy, he scored 75 runs for the Karachi Blues team that defeated Combined Services. He was selected to play for a Combined XI against the touring MCC team a few weeks later, and made 58, the top score on either side in a match ruined by rain. Then in the final of the Ayub Trophy, he scored 115 in Karachi's victory over North Zone. In that season he made 613 runs in 10 matches at an average of 51.08.

Ahmed was selected to tour England in 1962 with the Pakistan team. However, he played only nine of the 29 first-class matches and sometimes "went weeks on end without playing" and finished with only 155 runs at 11.92, with a highest score of 43 against Essex.

He studied at Oxford University after the tour and appeared for the university side irregularly in 1963 and 1964. He played 18 matches for Oxford, scoring 456 runs at 16.88, with a top score of 54 (retired hurt) against Pakistan Eaglets in 1963.

In his first match after returning to Pakistan, in November 1967, Ahmed opened the batting for Karachi Blues against Lahore Greens in the long-delayed final of the 1965-66 Ayub Trophy and made 114 in a ten-wicket victory. Later that month, in the final of the 1966-67 Quaid-e-Azam Trophy, he again opened the batting for Karachi and made 109 to help them to victory over Railways. He continued to play first-class cricket, with moderate success, until 1972.
