= Ahad Khan =

Pakistani cricketer

Personal information
- Full name: Abdul Ahad Khan
- Born: 25 September 1937 (age 89); Lahore, British India
- Batting: Right-handed
- Bowling: Right-arm leg-spin

Domestic team information
- Years: Team
- 1962-63 to 1980-81: Pakistan Railways

Career statistics
Competition	First-class
Matches	55
Runs scored	364
Batting average	6.38
100s/50s	0/0
Top score	40
Balls bowled	10,508
Wickets	214
Bowling average	19.29
5 wickets in innings	12
10 wickets in match	1
Best bowling	9/7
Catches/stumpings	24/–
- Source: Cricket Archive, 26 February 2014

Abdul Ahad Khan (born 25 September 1937) is a former Pakistani cricketer. A leg-spin bowler for the Pakistan Railways team, he achieved some remarkable bowling figures in domestic first-class cricket.

== 1960s ==
Ahad Khan made his first-class debut in December 1962. In his third match, playing for Railways against Quetta in a quarter-final of the 1962-63 Ayub Trophy, he took 5 for 29 and 4 for 32 in an innings victory.

He began the 1964–65 season by taking 5 for 122 and 3 for 35 in a friendly match for Railways against a strong Pakistan XI. In his next match, in the Ayub Trophy against Dera Ismail Khan, after not bowling in the first innings he opened the bowling in the second innings and took 9 for 7 in 6.3 overs; the other batsman was run out. A few days later he took his best match figures of 11 for 70 (8 for 42 and 3 for 28) against Lahore Education Board. A few days after that, in a quarter-final of the Ayub Trophy against Public Works Department, he took 6 for 72 and 2 for 57. He finished the season with 42 wickets at an average of 15.88.

In 1965-66 he took 6 for 33 against Peshawar, but played irregularly after that until the 1969–70 season, when he took 32 wickets at an average of only 8.18. He took 4 for 4 and 2 for 9 against Peshawar in the Quaid-e-Azam Trophy, and 3 for 9 and 6 for 17 against National Bank in the Ayub Trophy. In 1969-70 he also took 10 for 45 and 6 for 12 in a non-first-class club match.

Khan usually batted at number 10 or 11. His highest first-class score was 40 against Sargodha in 1963–64, when he took part in a last-wicket partnership of 86.

== 1970s ==
Khan played a major part in Railways' success in 1972–73, when they won the Quaid-e-Azam Trophy, and in 1973–74, when they won both the Quaid-e-Azam Trophy and the Patron's Trophy. In the Quaid-e-Azam Trophy in 1972-73 he took 6 for 27 and 3 for 18 against North-West Frontier Province, then in the final against Sind he took 7 for 41 and 2 for 46 in an innings victory.

In the Patron's Trophy in 1973-74 he took 7 for 49 in the semi-final against Pakistan Universities in a match restricted by rain to one innings each, then a week later in the final against Pakistan International Airlines A he took 3 for 55 and 5 for 29 to give Railways victory by 127 runs. Later in the season, in the final of the Quaid-e-Azam Trophy against Sind he took 3 for 47 and 3 for 29 and Railways won by 274 runs. He finished his most successful season with 50 wickets at 19.76.

After that, Khan's form deserted him. He took eight wickets in eight matches in 1974–75, then did not play again until 1980–81, when he took six wickets in his final two matches.
