= Ijaz Ahmed (cricketer, born 1949) =

Pakistani cricketer (1949–1999)

Personal information
- Full name: Ijaz Ahmed
- Born: 12 July 1949; Lahore, Punjab, Pakistan
- Died: 28 December 1999 (aged 50); Lahore, Punjab, Pakistan
- Batting: Right-handed
- Bowling: Right-arm medium-fast

Domestic team information
- Years: Team
- 1970/71–1971/72: Lahore
- 1971/72–1974/75: Punjab
- 1971/72: Punjab University, Lahore
- 1972/73: Pakistan Universities
- 1975/76–1984/85: National Bank of Pakistan

Career statistics
Competition	First-class	List A
Matches	109	20
Runs scored	5,991	435
Batting average	41.03	33.46
100s/50s	13/29	0/2
Top score	200*	91
Balls bowled	7,661	547
Wickets	131	12
Bowling average	24.77	24.91
5 wickets in innings	7	0
10 wickets in match	1	–
Best bowling	6/28	2/26
Catches/stumpings	68/–	5/–
- Source: Cricinfo, 18 April 2026

Ijaz Ahmed (12 July 1949 – 28 December 1999) was a Pakistani cricketer. Ahmed was a right-handed batsman and right-arm medium-fast bowler. He was born in Lahore, Punjab, and died in Lahore in December 1999.

Ahmed played first-class cricket for Lahore, Punjab, Punjab University, Lahore, Pakistan Universities and National Bank of Pakistan, and played List A cricket for Punjab and National Bank of Pakistan.

Ahmed scored 13 first-class centuries. These included one for Lahore, one for Lahore A, two for Lahore Greens, one for Pakistan Universities, one for Punjab, and seven for National Bank of Pakistan.

With the ball, Ahmed took seven five-wicket hauls in first-class cricket and one ten-wicket match. His best innings figures were 6 for 28. He played primarily a batting all-rounder.
