= Mohammad Naeem (field hockey) =

British Indian field hockey player

Syed Mohammad Naeem
Personal information
- Born: January 1914 British India
- Died: 1 November 1945 (aged 31) Karnal, British India

Sport
- Sport: Field hockey
- Position: Half-Back
National team
| Years | Team | Caps | Goals |
| 1935 | India | | - |

Syed Mohammad Naeem (Urdu: سید محمد نعیم; born 1914) is a former association field hockey player, who played as a Half-Back. He also represented the India hockey team in 1935.

== Early life ==
Naeem was born in January 1914, he would be educated from M.B. High School, Mozang. Before joining Islamia College.

== Club career ==
=== Early career ===
Naeem was the captain of Muslim Club of Mozang. As well as the Lahore based Brothers Hockey Club. He would also play and captain the Punjab University. Representing the team in Inter-Provincial competitions.

=== Senior career ===
In 1937, Naeem joined the Hockey department of Bhawanipore Hockey Club of Calcutta. Before then playing for Mohammedan Sporting. Where he captained the side for five consecutive years. Under his captainship, the team won the First Division Championship for the first time.

== International career ==
In 1935, Naeem was selected for the All-India Hockey Team which toured New Zealand and Australia.

== Personal life ==
His brothers, Saleem, Shamim, Naseem and Moeen were also prominent players in hockey and football.

== Death ==
He died at Karnal on 1 November 1945. After a short illness of malarial fever.
