= Mohammad Amin (Pakistani cricketer) =

Pakistani cricketer (born 1920)

Personal information
- Born: 10 October 1920; Lahore, British India
- Batting: Right-handed
- Bowling: Right-arm leg-spin

Domestic team information
- Years: Team
- 1944–45 to 1946–47: Northern India
- 1953–54 to 1957–58: Railways

Career statistics
Competition	First-class
Matches	20
Runs scored	171
Batting average	10.68
100s/50s	0/0
Top score	24 not out
Balls bowled	3134
Wickets	72
Bowling average	24.38
5 wickets in innings	5
10 wickets in match	0
Best bowling	6/113
Catches/stumpings	9/–
- Source: ESPNcricinfo, 30 March 2015

Mohammad Amin (born 10 October 1920, date of death unknown) was a Pakistani cricketer who played first-class cricket from 1944 to 1957, and played for Pakistan in the years before Pakistan played Test cricket.

== Cricket career ==
A leg-spin and googly bowler, Mohammad Amin played for Northern India in the Ranji Trophy before Pakistan gained independence. In December 1947 he played in the first first-class match in Pakistan, representing Punjab against Sind. He took 3 for 52 and 6 for 113 to help Punjab to an innings victory. He was thus the first player to take six wickets in an innings in Pakistan. He took 15 wickets in that first short season of cricket in Pakistan; no one else took more than nine. In a 12-a-side three-day match between Punjab and Sind in 1948–49 he took 12 wickets.

Amin played in the Pakistan national team's first match, which was against the touring West Indians in 1948–49, taking three wickets. He toured Ceylon with the Pakistan team later that season and played in both matches against Ceylon, but bowled only 18 overs, taking two wickets. His final match for Pakistan was against the Commonwealth XI in 1949–50.

When the Quaid-e-Azam Trophy began in 1953–54, Amin played for Pakistan Railways. He took 13 wickets at an average of 18.15 in the two matches, including 5 for 57 and 4 for 89 when Railways lost to Punjab in the semi-final, but younger spinners were preferred for the Test tour of England in 1954. He was one of three reserve players named for the tour, but he was not required. His last season was 1957–58, when in three matches for Railways he took 11 wickets at an average of 17.72.

Amin is deceased.
