= Asghar Ali =

Asghar Ali may refer to:

- Asghar Ali (cricketer, born 1971), United Arab Emirates cricketer
- Asghar Ali (cricketer, born 1924) (1924–1979), cricketer in India from 1943 to 1949, and in Pakistan from 1949 to 1957
