= Mohammad Amin =

Mohammad Amin may refer to:

- Mohammad Amin (historian) (1928–2012), Indian historian
- Mohammad Amin (cricketer, born 1920) (1920–?), Pakistani cricketer
- Mohammad Amin (footballer), (1931–1979), Pakistani footballer and manager
- Mohammad Amin (Kuwaiti cricketer) (born 1987), Kuwaiti cricketer
- Mohammad Amin (politician), Bangladesh Awami League politician
- Mohammad Ruhul Amin (1934–1971), Bangladesh Navy sailor
- Muhammad Amin Asiyalav, North Caucasian military commander

== See also ==
- Mohammed Amin (disambiguation)
- Mohamed Amin (1943–1996), Kenyan photojournalist
- Mohamed Amin Didi (1910–1954), Maldivian politician
- Mohammed Amyn (born 1976), Moroccan long-distance runner
