= Khalid Hasan (cricketer) =

Pakistani cricketer (1937–2013)

- Khalid Hasan in 1954

Personal information
- Full name: Khalid Hasan
- Born: 14 July 1937; Peshawar, North-West Frontier Province, British India (now Pakistan)
- Died: 3 December 2013 (aged 76); Lahore, Punjab, Pakistan
- Batting: Right-handed
- Bowling: Right-arm leg-break
- Role: Bowler

International information
- National side: Pakistan
- Only Test (cap 19): 1 July 1954 v England

Domestic team information
- Years: Team
- 1953–1954: Punjab
- 1958: Lahore

Career statistics
Competition	Test	FC
Matches	1	17
Runs scored	17	113
Batting average	17.00	11.30
100s/50s	0/0	0/0
Top score	10	30
Balls bowled	126	1,919
Wickets	2	28
Bowling average	58.00	38.25
5 wickets in innings	0	0
10 wickets in match	0	0
Best bowling	2/116	3/27
Catches/stumpings	0/–	3/–
- Source: CricketArchive, 6 January 2014

Khalid Hasan (14 July 1937 – 3 December 2013) was a Pakistani cricketer who represented the national side in a single Test match in 1954. Only 16 years and 352 days old on debut, he was the youngest Test player at the time, and remains the youngest player to play only a single Test match. As the match was dominated by England, he only got to bowl in one innings, however he did achieve the feat of bowling Denis Compton – albeit after the latter had scored a double century. Khalid, a right-arm leg spinner, played 17 first-class matches in total, 14 of which came on Pakistan's 1954 tour of the British Isles.

== See also ==
- List of Pakistan Test cricketers
