= Indian cricket team in Pakistan in 1954–55 =

International cricket tour

	India	Pakistan
- Dates: 28 December 1954 – 1 March 1955
Captains	Vinoo Mankad	Abdul Kardar

Test series
- Result: 5-match series drawn 0–0
Most runs	Pankaj Roy (273)	Alimuddin (332)
Most wickets	Subhash Gupte (21)	Khan Mohammad (22)

The India national cricket team toured Pakistan during the 1954–55 cricket season, from late December to early March. They played five Test matches against the Pakistan cricket team, with the series drawn 0–0. It was the first Test series to be played in Pakistan. Overall, the Indian team played 14 first-class matches on the tour, winning five and drawing nine.

== Indian touring team ==
- Ghulam Ahmed
- Lala Amarnath
- Prakash Bhandari
- Chandu Borde
- Bal Dani
- Chandrasekhar Gadkari
- C. D. Gopinath
- Subhash Gupte
- Vijay Manjrekar
- Vinoo Mankad (captain)
- Madhav Mantri
- Jasubhai Patel
- Dattu Phadkar
- Pananmal Punjabi
- Gulabrai Ramchand
- Pankaj Roy
- Naren Tamhane
- Polly Umrigar

== Test matches ==
=== 1st Test ===
1–4 January 1955 (4-day match)
scorecard

Pakistan	v	India
257 (136.2 overs); Imtiaz Ahmed 54; Ghulam Ahmed 5/109 (45 overs)		148 (82.5 overs); Gulabrai Ramchand 37; Mahmood Hussain 6/67 (27 overs)
158 (86.2 overs); Alimuddin 51; Subhash Gupte 5/18 (6 overs)		147/2 (82 overs); Vijay Manjrekar 74; Khan Mohammad 2/18 (12 overs)

Match drawn
Dacca Stadium, Dhaka, East Pakistan
Umpires: Daud Khan, Idrees Baig

- Pakistan won the toss and decided to bat
- Pananmal Punjabi and Naren Tamhane (Ind) both made their Test debuts.

=== 2nd Test ===
15–18 January 1955 (4-day match)
scorecard

India	v	Pakistan
235 (119.5 overs); Naren Tamhane 54; Khan Mohammad 5/74 (33 overs)		312/9d (164 overs); Hanif Mohammad 142; Polly Umrigar 6/74 (58 overs)
209/5 (89 overs); Pankaj Roy 78; Khan Mohammad 2/50 (22 overs)

Match drawn
Bahawal Stadium, Bahawalpur
Umpires: Idrees Baig (Pak) and Shujauddin (Pak)

- India won the toss and elected to bat.
- Hanif Mohammad (Pak) scored his maiden century in Tests.
- Pankaj Roy (Ind) passed 1,000 runs in Tests.

=== 3rd Test ===
29 Jan-1 Feb 1955 (4-day match)
Scorecard

Pakistan	v	India
328 (187.5 overs); Maqsood Ahmed 99; Subhash Gupte 5/133 (73.5 overs)		251 (128.1 overs); Polly Umrigar 78; Mahmood Hussain 4/70 (26.1 overs)
136/5 d. (84.3 overs); Alimuddin 58; Vinoo Mankad 3/33 (28 overs)		74/2 (32 overs); Chandrasekhar Gadkari 27; Abdul Kardar 2/20 (12 overs)

Match drawn
Bagh-e-Jinnah, Lahore
Umpires: Idrees Baig, Shujauddin

- Pakistan won the toss and decided to bat
- Miran Bakhsh (Pak) made his Test debut.

=== 4th Test ===
12–15 February 1955 (4-day match)
Scorecard

Pakistan	v	India
188 (146.3 overs); Waqar Hasan 43; Subhash Gupte 5/63 (41.3 overs)		245 (108 overs); Polly Umrigar 108; Khan Mohammad 4/79 (36 overs)
182 (122 overs); Imtiaz Ahmed 69; Vinoo Mankad 5/64 (54 overs)		23/1 (19 overs); Pankaj Roy 13; Hanif Mohammad 1/1 (4 overs)

Match drawn
Peshawar Club Ground, Peshawar
Umpires: Idrees Baig, Shujauddin

- Pakistan won the toss and decided to bat.

=== 5th Test ===
26 Feb-1 Mar 1955 (4-day match)
Scorecard

Pakistan	v	India
162 (96 overs); Imtiaz Ahmed 37; Gulabrai Ramchand 6/49 (28 overs)		145 (63.3 overs); Pankaj Roy 37; Fazal Mahmood 5/48 (28.3 overs)
241/5 d. (86 overs); Alimuddin 103; Polly Umrigar 2/64 (27 overs)		69/2 (32 overs); Pananmal Punjabi 22; Maqsood Ahmed 1/5 (5 overs)

Match drawn
National Stadium, Karachi
Umpires: Daud Khan, Masood Salahuddin

- Pakistan won the toss and decided to bat
- Prakash Bhandari and Jasubhai Patel (Ind) both made their Test debuts.
