= Farooq Azeem =

Pakistani cricketer (born 1941)

Personal information
- Full name: Syed Farooq Azeem Hasan
- Born: 17 October 1941 (age 85); Lahore, Punjab, British India
- Batting: Right-handed
- Bowling: Right-arm medium-fast

Domestic team information
- Years: Team
- 1959/60: Pakistan Universities
- 1959/60: Punjab University
- 1962–1963: Oxford University

Career statistics
Competition	First-class
Matches	11
Runs scored	44
Batting average	5.50
100s/50s	–/–
Top score	17
Balls bowled	995
Wickets	15
Bowling average	44.26
5 wickets in innings	–
10 wickets in match	–
Best bowling	2/15
Catches/stumpings	3/–
- Source: Cricinfo, 3 May 2020

Syed Farooq Azeem Hasan (born 17 October 1941), also known as FA Hassan, SFA Hasan, is a Pakistani barrister and former first-class cricketer.
