= Ebbu Ghazali =

Pakistan Air Force wing commander and cricketer

- M.E.Z. Ghazali in 1954

Personal information
- Full name: Mohammad Ebrahim Zainuddin Ghazali
- Born: 15 June 1924; Bombay, British India (Now Mumbai, Maharashtra, India)
- Died: 26 April 2003 (aged 78); Karachi, Pakistan
- Batting: Right-handed
- Bowling: Right-arm offbreak

International information
- National side: Pakistan
- Test debut (cap 18): 1 July 1954 v England
- Last Test: 22 July 1954 v England

Domestic team information
- Years: Team
- 1942/43–1946/47: Maharashtra
- 1953/54–1955/56: Combined Services

Career statistics
Competition	Tests	First-class
Matches	2	47
Runs scored	32	1701
Batting average	8.00	27.43
100s/50s	0/0	2/7
Top score	18	160
Balls bowled	48	5065
Wickets	0	61
Bowling average	–	34.27
5 wickets in innings	–	2
10 wickets in match	–	0
Best bowling	–	5/28
Catches/stumpings	0/–	17/–
- Source: ESPNcricinfo, 10 October 2022

Mohammad Ebrahim Zainuddin "Ebbu" Ghazali (15 June 1924 – 26 April 2003) was a Pakistan Air Force officer, cricketer and cricket administrator who played for Pakistan in two Tests in 1954.

== Early life and family ==
Ghazali was born in Bombay, British India, on 15 June 1924, in a Konkani Muslim family. His family migrated to Karachi after the partition of India in 1947.

Ghazali was the son-in-law of Feroze Khan who won a gold medal in the 1928 Olympics for India in field hockey and whose son Farooq Feroze Khan served as Chairman Joint Chiefs of Staff Committee in the Pakistan Air Force. He was also a relative of Test cricketer Ijaz Faqih: his sister was Ijaz Faqih's mother-in-law.

== Career ==
Ghazali played first-class cricket in India and Pakistan from 1943 to 1956. A middle-order batsman and off-spin bowler, he made his top score in the inaugural season of the Quaid-e-Azam Trophy when he scored 160 and 61 for Combined Services against Karachi, in December 1953. He took his best bowling figures of 5 for 28 in April 1955 when he captained Combined Services against Punjab in the semi-final of the Quaid-e-Azam Trophy.

He toured England with the Pakistan team in 1954, but was only moderately successful, making 601 runs at an average of 28.61 and taking 17 wickets at 39.64. In his second Test, at Old Trafford, he was dismissed for a pair within two hours.

After his playing career, Ghazali became an administrator. He managed Pakistan's tour of Australia and New Zealand in 1972–73. He served in the Pakistan Air Force, reaching the rank of wing commander.
