= Malik Ahmed Khan =

Pakistani cricketer and umpire

Personal information
- Full name: Malik Ahmed Khan
- Batting: Right-handed
- Bowling: Right-arm medium

Domestic team information
- Years: Team
- 1932: Patiala
- 1934–1944: Northern India
- 1941: Muslims

Umpiring information
- FC umpired: 10 (1953–1973)

Career statistics
Competition	FC
Matches	8
Runs scored	133
Batting average	11.08
100s/50s	0/0
Top score	31
Balls bowled	1,006
Wickets	16
Bowling average	26.62
5 wickets in innings	0
10 wickets in match	0
Best bowling	3/29
Catches/stumpings	4/–
- Source: CricketArchive, 24 May 2015

Malik Ahmed Khan, known as Ahmed Khan, was a Pakistani cricket player and umpire. His first-class playing career spanned from 1932 to 1950, with all but one match coming prior to the partition of India in 1947. He made his first-class umpiring debut in 1953, and continued until 1973, having officiated in various Pakistani domestic competitions.

Ahmed made his first-class debut in November 1932, playing a once-off game for the Rawalpindi Sports Club in the semi-final of the Moin-ud-Dowlah Gold Cup Tournament. A right-arm medium pacer, he took 3/145 on debut in the only innings of his opponent, the Freelooters, with his victims including future Indian Test players Amar Singh and Vijay Merchant. Ahmed's performance there led to a guest appearance for Patiala later in the season, playing under the captaincy of Maharajah of Patiala's son, Yadavindra Singh. The team's opponent was the touring Ceylonese national team, and Ahmed took the wickets of two top-order batsmen in Ceylon's first innings, finishing with 2/15. While batting in Patiala's second innings, he put on 35 runs for the last wicket with Mohammad Nissar, though this was not enough to prevent Ceylon winning by 63 runs.

In December 1934, Ahmed was selected to appear for Northern India in the inaugural edition of the Ranji Trophy. In the first game of the tournament, against the Indian Army team in Lahore, he took four wickets for the match, including what were to be career-best figures of 3/29 in the second innings. However, after a poor performance in the next match against Southern Punjab, he was dropped for both the semi-final against Central India and the final against Bombay. Ahmed is not recorded as playing in any further major matches until August 1940, during the 1940 English season, when he appeared for an Indian side in a fundraising game against a "British Empire XI". He was back in India for the 1940–41 season, and there played two first-class fixtures, one in the Amritsar Tournament (for a Muslims team against The Rest), and then a Ranji match for Northern India against Maharashtra. Ahmed again played a single Ranji match during the 1943–44 season, against Western India, and also featured in a match played in Lahore for the war fund. His team in that game was named for George Barne, the Bishop of Lahore and himself an ex-first-class cricketer.

After partition in 1947, Ahmed remained involved in cricket in the newly independent Pakistan. His last major matches as a player came during the 1949–50 season, and both for a "Commander-in-Chief's XI". Ahmed played a two-day game against the touring Commonwealth XI side, in Rawalpindi in November 1949, and made his eighth and final first-class appearance in March 1950, against Ceylon. Subsequently, taking up umpiring, during the inaugural 1953–54 season of the Quaid-i-Azam Trophy he officiated the match between Combined Services and Karachi, thus becoming one of the few people involved in the inaugural editions of both the Ranji and the Quaid-i-Azam tournaments. During his first few years of umpiring, Ahmed umpired mostly in Karachi, but he later switched to Peshawar, with five out of his six post-1960 matches as umpire coming in that city. His final appearance as a first-class umpire came during the 1973–74 Patron's Trophy, after a gap of almost nine years.
