= Ijaz Ahmed Chaudhry (judge, born 1945) =

Pakistani judge (1945–2015)

Chaudhry Ijaz Ahmed چودھری اعجاز احمد

Justice of the Supreme Court of Pakistan
- In office September 14, 2005 – May 4, 2010

Justice of the Lahore High Court
- In office May 28, 1997 – September 13, 2005

Personal details
- Born: May 5, 1945 Jabal, Narowal, Punjab, Pakistan

Supreme Court of Pakistan

Chaudhry Ijaz Ahmed (Urdu: چودھری اعجاز احمد) (May 5, 1945 – October 11, 2015) was a justice of the Supreme Court of Pakistan and of the Lahore High Court.

== Early life ==
Chaudhry Ijaz Ahmed was born on May 5, 1945, in Chak No. 15/SB, Bhalwal Tehsil, Sargodha District. He belonged to a farming family.

== Education and training ==
He graduated from Islamia College, Civil Lines, Lahore and then did his LL.B. from the University of Punjab, Lahore.

== Professional career ==
Ijaz Ahmed enteredthe legal profession by joining the law chamber of S. M. Zafar, and later established his own office under the name and style of Ijaz Law Associates. He entered as Advocate of subordinate Courts in 1973, advocate of the High Court in 1975, and advocate of Supreme Court of Pakistan in 1981.

He was Deputy Attorney General for Pakistan from August 26, 1990, till November 3, 1995.

He also served as legal adviser to:

- Board of Intermediate and Secondary Education, Lahore from 1979 till elevation to Lahore High Court
- Board of Intermediate and Secondary Education, Gujranwala from 1995 till elevation to Lahore High Court
- University of Punjab, Lahore from 1995 to April 1997
- Punjab Text Book Board Lahore and Settlement Department

Chaudhry Ijaz Ahmed was on the Panel of Advocates of:

- National Bank of Pakistan
- Pakistan Industrial Credit and Investment Corporation (PICIC)
- Water and Power Development Authority (WAPDA)

He also acted as Honorary Legal Adviser to:

- University Grants Commission
- Islamia College Old Boys Association
- Anjuman-e-Kashtkaran (working for the betterment of farmers)
- Residents Association of Lahore Cantonment Cooperative Housing Society

He served as a part-time Lecturer in the University Law College Lahore and Civil Services Academy Lahore.

He was elected as General Secretary Lahore High Court Bar Association in 1985 and was a member of Executive Committee Lahore High Court Bar Association in 1979 and 1987. He was a member of the Publication Committee High Court Bar Association Lahore and Joint Secretary Pakistan, Young Lawyers Forum in 1975. Ijaz Ahmed also acted as Secretary (Legal) Anjuman-e-Tuhaffiz-e-Haqooq-e-Insani in 1978 and was Joint Secretary of Forum Civil Liberties in 1979.

Ijaz Ahmed was Secretary General and remained Vice President of the Human Rights Society of Pakistan.

He is the author of four books:

1. Separation and Independence of Judiciary
2. Fikr-o Nazar
3. Manual of Election Laws
4. Supreme Court References

He represented Pakistan at the Second International Conference on training of the judiciary held at Ottawa, Canada, and contributed a paper on the topic “Methods of Educating newly appointed Judges” (PLD 2005 Journal Page 1).

Ijaz Ahmed was elevated as Judge of the Lahore High Court on May 28, 1997. He was elevated as Judge of the Supreme Court of Pakistan on 1 September 14, 2005, while he was acting Chief Justice of Lahore High Court, Lahore.

He retired from the Supreme Court on 4 May 2010.

== Personal life ==
He was settled in DHA Lahore. He was married and had one son and three daughters. His elder daughter, Nausheen Ijaz, is married to son of former Shariat court Chief Justice Zafar Yaseen.

He died on October 11, 2015, and was laid to rest on October 13.
