= Pakistan Universities cricket team =

Cricket team

Pakistan Universities were a first-class cricket side in Pakistan. They played first-class matches between 1950 and 1989, and took part in Pakistan's domestic competitions between 1958–59 and 1962–63, and again between 1972–73 and 1978–79.

== Matches against touring teams ==
Pakistan Universities played their first match against the visiting Ceylon team in 1949–50. Captained by Khan Mohammad, they drew the match, finishing on 214 for 7 in pursuit of 275 for victory. They lost their next match, against the Indians in 1954–55, by an innings, and drew against an MCC team in 1955–56.

They lost to a Commonwealth XI in 1967–68 after their captain, Majid Khan declared twice to keep the game alive. They drew a match against the Sri Lankans in 1973–74, and also their last first-class match, against Sri Lanka B in 1988–89.

== Domestic competition ==
Pakistan Universities entered the Quaid-i-Azam Trophy in 1958–59, having the better of a draw against Railways before losing on the first innings to Lahore. They had a draw and a loss in 1959–60, when in the draw against East Pakistan, Asif Ahmed, on his first-class debut, hit their first century, 148, and Javed Saeed took 8 for 36, which remained the team's best bowling figures. They suffered three losses by large margins in 1962–63, when their totals were 130, 94, 102, 98, 111 and 89.

They next appeared in first-class competitions in 1972–73, playing in the Patron's Trophy. In the first match, against Public Works Department, they dominated a draw, the captain Wasim Raja taking 5 for 77 and 5 for 23 and scoring 117. They drew their other Patron's Trophy match and also their only Quaid-i-Azam Trophy match that season.

In 1973–74, in Pakistan Universities' fifteenth first-class match, they won for the first time, beating Lahore A by 10 wickets in the Patron's Trophy. The captain, Agha Zahid hit the top score of the match, 85 not out. Later that season, in the Pentangular Trophy, Mohsin Khan scored 229, his first century, in the draw against Sind, which remained Pakistan Universities' highest score.

In 1974–75 Pakistan Universities, playing in three competitions, had their best season. In their first match of the season they beat Bahawalpur by an innings and 188 runs in the Patron's Trophy, making their record score of 641, Azhar Khan hitting 209 not out. They won two of their five matches in the Pentangular Trophy, finishing third, Mudassar Nazar hitting four centuries. They had another innings victory in the Quaid-i-Azam Trophy, beating Punjab B. Of their nine matches in 1974–75 they won four, lost three and drew two.

Thereafter their record slipped, and they won only two more matches in the next four seasons, both in the Quaid-i-Azam Trophy: against Railways in 1977–78 and against North-West Frontier Province in 1978–79 by two wickets.

== Overall record ==
Pakistan Universities played 49 first-class matches, winning 7, losing 22 and drawing 20.

== Grounds ==
Pakistan Universities played most of their home matches at the Punjab University Ground in Lahore.

== Other sources ==
- Wisden Cricketers' Almanack 1951 to 1990
