= Pananmal Punjabi =

Indian cricketer (1921–2011)

Personal information
- Full name: Pananmal Hotchand Punjabi
- Born: 20 September 1921; Karachi, British India
- Died: 4 October 2011 (aged 90); Mumbai, India
- Batting: Right-handed

International information
- National side: India
- Test debut (cap 71): 1 January 1955 v Pakistan
- Last Test: 26 February 1955 v Pakistan

Career statistics
Competition	Test	First-class
Matches	5	32
Runs scored	164	1,953
Batting average	16.40	38.29
100s/50s	0/0	6/5
Top score	33	224*
Balls bowled	–	132
Wickets	–	2
Bowling average	–	50.00
5 wickets in innings	–	0
10 wickets in match	–	0
Best bowling	–	1/10
Catches/stumpings	5/–	16/–
- Source: CricInfo, 20 November 2022

Pananmal Hotchand Punjabi (20 September 1921 – 4 October 2011) was an Indian cricketer who played in five Test matches in 1955.

A right-handed opening batsman, Punjabi had a long but somewhat intermittent first-class cricket career, starting with two matches for Sind before partition and resuming more regularly from 1951 for Gujarat. In the 1953–54 season, he scored three centuries in three matches and was then picked for the tour to Pakistan the following season, 1954–55. He opened the batting in all five Tests with Pankaj Roy, and scored 164 runs, the fourth highest aggregate for the team. But his highest was only 33 and the series consisted largely of defensive cricket with all Tests drawn, the first time this had happened in a five-match series.

He played on in Indian domestic cricket until 1959–60, scoring his highest score, an undefeated 224, in his penultimate game, but was never selected again for Test cricket. Despite his name, Punjabi came from Karachi, spoke Sindhi, represented Gujarat for most of his first class career, and was employed as a supervisor in Burmah Shell.

Punjabi died in 2011 but his death was noticed in cricketing circles only in 2014.
