= Fazal-ur-Rehman (cricketer, born 1935) =

Pakistani cricketer (born 1935)

Personal information
- Full name: Sheikh Fazal-ur-Rehman
- Born: 11 June 1935 (age 91); Amritsar, British India (now India)
- Batting: Right-handed
- Bowling: Legbreak
- Relatives: Abdur Rehman (brother)

International information
- National side: Pakistan
- Only Test (cap 28): 13 March 1958 v West Indies

Career statistics
Competition	Tests	First-class
Matches	1	29
Runs scored	10	722
Batting average	5.00	19.00
100s/50s	0/0	1/5
Top score	8	104
Balls bowled	204	5033
Wickets	1	96
Bowling average	99.00	21.32
5 wickets in innings	0	6
10 wickets in match	0	1
Best bowling	1/43	6/21
Catches/stumpings	1/–	16/–
- Source: ESPNcricinfo, 13 June 2016

Sheikh Fazal-ur-Rehman (Urdu: شیخ فضل الرحمٰن; born 11 June 1935) is a former Pakistani cricketer who played in one Test in 1958.

== Education ==
He was educated at Islamia College, Lahore. After he retired from cricket, he completed a Master's degree in Islamic Studies and became a devout Muslim, giving weekly sermons.
