= Mohammed Amin =

Mohammed Amin may refer to:

- Mohammed Amin (politician) (1928–2018), Indian politician
- Mohammed Amin (boxer) (1913–?), Egyptian boxer
- Mohammed Amin (businessman), British Muslim businessman

== See also ==
- Mohamed Amin (1943–1996), Kenyan photojournalist
- Mohamed Amin (Egyptian film director), Egyptian film director
- Mohamed Amin (footballer) (born 1999), Sudanese association footballer
- Mohamed Amin Didi (1910–1954), Maldivian politician
- Mohammed Amyn (born 1976), Moroccan long-distance runner
- Mohamed Salah Amin (born 1947), Egyptian boxer
- Mohammad Amin (disambiguation)
