= Masood Salahuddin =

Pakistani cricketer and umpire (1915–2006)

Personal information
- Born: 24 December 1915; Merath, Uttar Pradesh, India
- Died: 21 March 2006 (aged 90); Lahore, Pakistan
- Batting: Right-handed
- Bowling: Right-arm medium-fast
- Role: Captain

Domestic team information
- Years: Team
- 1934-35 to 1940-41: United Provinces
- 1953-54 to 1958-59: Railways

Umpiring information
- Tests umpired: 1 (1955)

Career statistics
Competition	First-class
Matches	24
Runs scored	528
Batting average	14.66
100s/50s	0/0
Top score	42
Balls bowled	1750
Wickets	39
Bowling average	23.23
5 wickets in innings	1
10 wickets in match	0
Best bowling	6/62
Catches/stumpings	9/-
- Source: Cricinfo, 18 December 2013

Masood Salahuddin (24 December 1915 – 21 March 2006) was a Pakistani cricket umpire. He stood in one Test match, Pakistan vs. India in Karachi in 1955.

He had a long playing career in first-class cricket as a pace bowler, beginning in the Ranji Trophy in 1934-35 for United Provinces, and continuing after independence of Pakistan as captain of Railways until 1958-59. He took 21 wickets at an average of 18.80 for United Provinces, including 6 for 62 against Bengal in 1939-40. He played two matches for India against the visiting Australian team in 1935-36. For Railways his captaincy was more important: beginning his career there at the age of 37, in 10 matches he bowled only 102 overs and took 12 wickets at 24.41, and sometimes made useful runs in the lower order, 275 at 17.18.

Although he had never umpired in first-class cricket, he had just captained North Zone against the Indians a few days previously, and was one of the Test selectors, called upon to umpire the Fifth Test in the 1954-55 series, with the approval of the Indian team. He explained: "The umpire got ill and we had no reserve ... I was an official with the railways and had played cricket. But with no umpiring experience I was asked to stand in a Test." He may have been being diplomatic: his obituary in Wisden gives the reason for the emergency as "a row over the appointed officials", and adds that he "showed his mettle" when he gave Abdul Kardar, the Pakistani captain, out stumped for 93.

He was assistant manager of the Pakistan team in England in 1954, and managed the tour of England in 1971.

He studied architecture at University College London. He died after a road accident in Lahore.

== See also ==
- List of Test cricket umpires
- Indian cricket team in Pakistan in 1954–55
