= Shafiq Ahmed =

Pakistani cricketer (born 1949)

Cricket information
- Batting: Right-handed
- Bowling: Right-arm medium

International information
- National side: Pakistan
- Test debut (cap 68): 25 July 1974 v England
- Last Test: 30 December 1980 v West Indies
- ODI debut (cap 22): 23 December 1977 v England
- Last ODI: 13 January 1978 v England

Career statistics
Competition	Test	ODI	FC	LA
Matches	6	3	266	42
Runs scored	99	41	19,572	1,117
Batting average	11.00	13.66	49.92	29.39
100s/50s	0/0	0/0	53/113	2/6
Top score	27*	29	217*	133*
Balls bowled	8	–	7,179	368
Wickets	0	–	99	5
Bowling average	–	–	33.53	37.20
5 wickets in innings	–	–	0	0
10 wickets in match	–	–	0	0
Best bowling	–	–	4/27	2/24
Catches/stumpings	0/–	1/–	218/–	10/–
- Source: CricInfo, 17 December 2013

Shafiq Ahmed (born 28 March 1949) is a former Pakistani cricketer who played in six Test matches and 3 One Day Internationals from 1974 to 1980. All of the Tests Ahmed played in ended in draws, and he co-holds the Test record with Chandrasekhar Gadkari for the most matches played in a career without either winning or losing. Shafiq Ahmed participated in cricket competitions from Pakistan as well as Lahore, National Bank of Pakistan, Punjab, Punjab University and United Bank of Pakistan.

Shafiq Ahmed was a prolific run-scorer in domestic cricket in Pakistan between 1967 and 1968, when he made his first-class debut for Punjab University at the age of 18, until 1990–91, when he played his final first-class match for United Bank Limited at the age of 41. He scored over 1000 first-class runs in a season seven times. He played as the professional for Church and Oswaldtwistle in the Lancashire League from 1975 to 1977.

== Early days ==
Shafiq Ahmed was the leading scorer in domestic cricket in Pakistan between 1967–68 and 1991–1990, when he started his first class matches for Punjab University at the age of 18 and his last at the age of 41. Shafiq Ahmed, a 41-year-old first-class player from United Bank Limited, scored more than 1,000 runs seven times in a single season. He was an attractive right-handed batsman who was skilled at creating natural strokes in his own class. He was keen to play in either the opening or the No. 3 position for Pakistan. He had a beautiful, straightforward style and he was an expert and hard worker in driving the ball in a great way. Although he excelled in his first-class career, he failed to demonstrate his prowess in international cricket and played only six Tests, despite scoring a magnificent 51 centuries in domestic cricket and is one of four Pakistanis. In addition to his first-class career average of over 50, he also occasionally bowled at medium speed.

== Performance in Test cricket ==
Shafiq Ahmed started his Test career against England at Leeds. In this draw match Pakistan scored 285 runs while playing first. Shafiq scored 7 runs in the first innings while his score was 18 in the second innings. He had to wait 3 years for his next Test and when the England cricket team visited Pakistan in 1977, Shafiq Ahmed was part of the national team. In the first Test in Lahore he had to be limited to 7 runs. He scored 13 and an unbeaten 27 in the Tests. Although it was not an impressive performance, he was given a chance in the last Test in Karachi but he failed to meet the expectations once they lost courage on the runs

== The last series ==
He was recalled in 1980 after a gap of two years. This was the occasion when the West Indies team was on a tour of Pakistan. Apart from scoring 17 runs in the innings, he could not make any move and the figure of zero stuck with him and thus Shafiq Ahmed could not give a memorable look to his last Test series.

== One Day International Cricket ==
Shafiq Ahmed started his ODI career against England in Sahiwal in 1977. In his first match he scored 29 runs while in the same series he scored 9 runs in Sialkot match. He played his third and last ODI in 1978. In which he got access to only 3 runs, obviously when will he get another chance?

== Statistics ==
Shafiq Ahmed played 6 Test matches in which he remained unbeaten once in 10 innings and made a total of 99 runs. Shaikh Ahmed scored 41 runs in 3 innings of 3 ODIs in which 29 was his highest individual score. With an average of 13.88, the set can be seen as a reflection of a single player's struggle to make a dent. Made from 217 not out was his highest score in a single innings. 53 centuries and 113 half centuries and 218 catches are also part of his record in this style of cricket. 99 players led the way to the pavilion 27/4 was their best bowling in a single innings and had a bowling average of 33.53

== After retirement ==
After retiring from all forms of cricket, Shafiq Ahmed played the role of referee in first class and A-list matches. He officiated in 14 first-class and 9-A-list matches.
