= Zulfiqar Ahmed (Pakistani cricketer) =

Pakistani cricketer (1926–2008)

Personal information
- Born: 22 November 1926; Lahore, Punjab, British India
- Died: 3 October 2008 (aged 81); Combined Military Hospital, Lahore, Pakistan
- Batting: Right-handed
- Bowling: Right-arm offbreak

International information
- National side: Pakistan (1952–1956)
- Test debut (cap 13): 23 October 1952 v India
- Last Test: 11 October 1956 v Australia

Career statistics
Competition	Test	First-class
Matches	9	61
Runs scored	200	975
Batting average	33.33	19.11
100s/50s	0/1	0/4
Top score	63*	73
Balls bowled	1,285	9,337
Wickets	20	163
Bowling average	18.30	21.84
5 wickets in innings	2	12
10 wickets in match	1	3
Best bowling	6/42	7/69
Catches/stumpings	5/–	21/–
- Source: CricInfo, 12 July 2019

Zulfiqar Ahmed (born 22 November 1926 – 3 October 2008) was a Pakistani cricketer who played in nine Test matches from 1952 to 1956. He was educated at Islamia College, Lahore.

== Biography ==
He was primarily an off-spin bowler, but was also a very useful late-order batsman. His finest hour was when he took 11 for 79 in the match in a Test against New Zealand in Karachi in 1955.

His sister, Shahzadi, married Abdul Hafeez Kardar, Pakistan's first Test cricket captain.
