= Government Islamia College, Civil Lines, Lahore =

Public college in Lahore, Pakistan

- اسلامیہ کالج
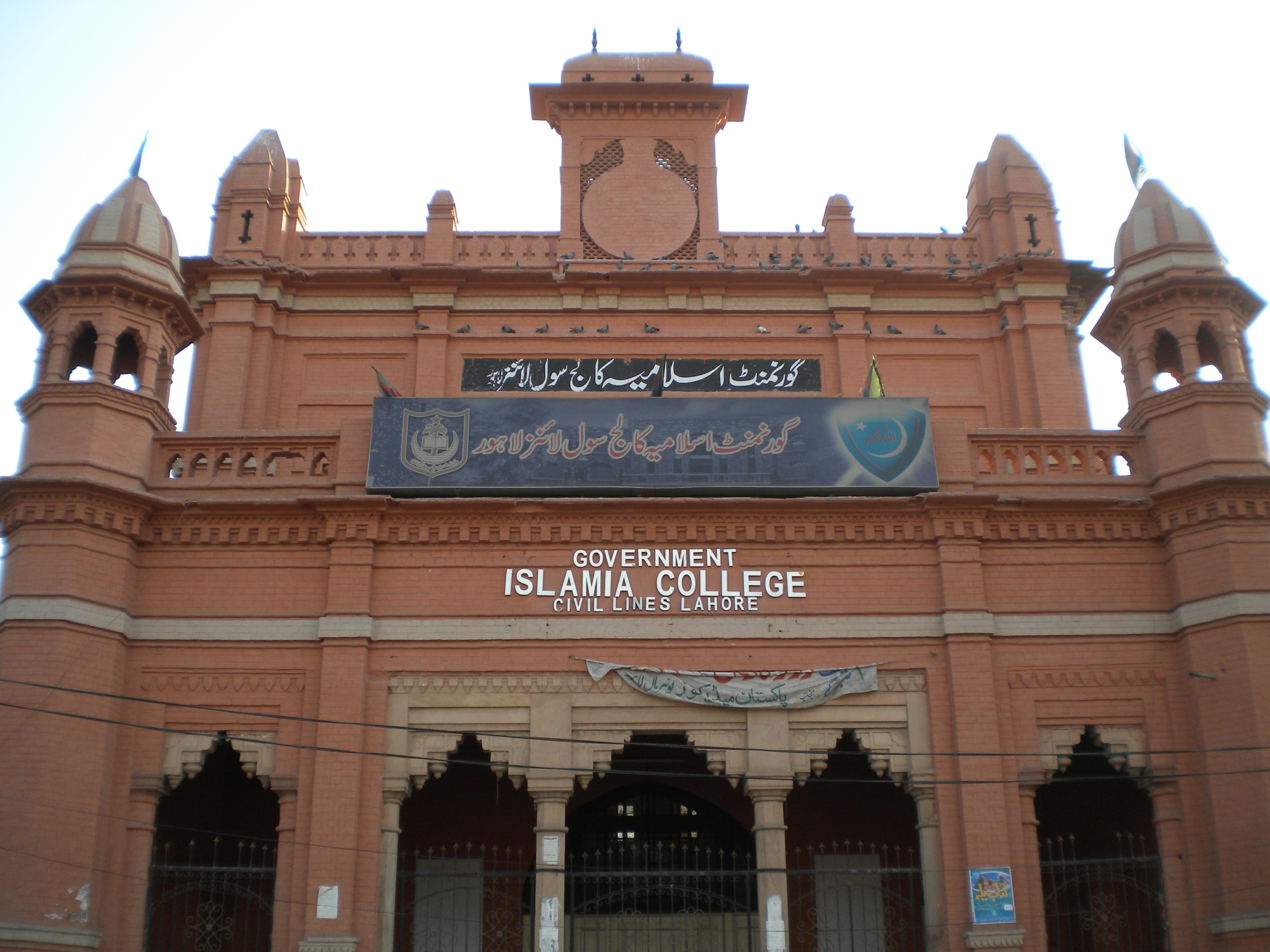
- Former name: Dayanand Anglo Vedic College
- Type: Government college
- Established: 1 June 1886
- Location: Lahore, Punjab, Pakistan
- Campus: Urban
- Nicknames: Faranians, Habibians
- Website: giccl.edu.pk

Government Islamia College, Civil Lines, Lahore (Urdu: اسلامیہ کالج) is a government college in Lahore, Punjab, Pakistan. Founded by the Arya Samaj as the Dayanand Anglo Vedic school on 1 June 1886, It was later renamed Dayanand Anglo Vedic (DAV) College after the Hindu leader Dayananda Saraswati.

The college was nationalized by the Zulfiqar Ali Bhutto regime in 1972. It is operated by the Ministry of Education (Higher Wing), Government of Punjab, Pakistan.

== History ==
The Islamia College, Civil Lines was originally founded by the Arya Samaj as a school in 1866 and later named the Dayanand Anglo-Vedic College in Lahore. In 1947 DAV (Dayanand Anglo Vedic) College was shifted to D.A.V. College (Lahore) in Ambala, Haryana, India after partition and the college was renamed as Islamia College. Graduates and students of this college are referred to as "Faranians".

On 17 December 1928, Bhagat Singh, Shivaram Rajguru and Sukhdev Thapar waited at the entrance of the college planning to kill Superintendent of Police James A Scott. However, in a case of mistaken identity, the plotters shot John P. Saunders, an Assistant Superintendent of Police, as he was leaving the District Police Headquarters across the street, and ran towards Government College.

== Notable alumni ==
Religious scholars

- Muhammad Abdul Wahhab, Religious scholar

Politicians

- Sartaj Aziz, former Finance Minister of Pakistan
- Choudhry Rahmat Ali, the person who coined the name "Pakistan"
- Sardar Ibrahim Khan, founder and first president of The Azad Kashmir
- Chaudhry Muhammad Ali, former Prime Minister of Pakistan
- Malik Meraj Khalid, former Prime Minister of Pakistan and former speaker of the National Assembly of Pakistan
- Moeen Qureshi, former interim Prime Minister of Pakistan
- Sheikh Mohammad Abdullah, former Prime Minister of Kashmir (India)
- Maulana Abdul Sattar Khan Niazi, religious scholar and politician
- Mian Manzoor Ahmad Wattoo, Federal Minister and former Chief Minister of Punjab
- Mian Mahmud Ali Kasuri, former Law Minister of Pakistan
- Mian Muhammad Aslam Iqbal, former provincial minister of Punjab
- Thakur Devi Singh, former MLA and minister in Himachal Pradesh, India
- Salig Ram, former MP, Rajya Sabha, and minister in Himachal Pradesh, India

Judiciary and government officials

- Zahid Hussain, founding Governor of the State Bank of Pakistan in 1948
- S. A. Rahman, former Chief Justice of the Supreme Court of Pakistan
- Muhammad Yaqub Ali, former Chief Justice of the Supreme Court of Pakistan
- Amir Alam Khan, former Judge of Lahore High Court
- Chaudhry Ijaz Ahmed, Justice of the Supreme Court of Pakistan
- Mian Mahmud Ali Kasuri, former Law Minister
- Tariq Majid, former Chairman, Joint Chiefs of Staff Committee, Pakistan Armed Forces
- Sheikh Riaz Ahmad, former Chief Justice
- Rashid Aziz, Former Chief Justice of Lahore High Court

Sports personalities

- Fazal Mahmood, former captain of Pakistan Cricket Team
- Abdul Hafeez Kardar, first captain of Pakistan Cricket Team
- Khan Mohammad, former test cricketer; took the first test wicket for Pakistan
- Imtiaz Ahmed, former captain of Pakistan Cricket Team
- Nazar Mohammad, former test cricketer, who scored the first century for Pakistan in test cricket
- Zameer Haider, international cricket umpire
- Gul Mohammad, former test cricketer, who represented India and Pakistan in test cricket
- Maqsood Ahmed, also known as Merry Max, former test cricketer
- Saeed Ahmed, former captain of Pakistan Cricket Team
- Asif Masood, former test cricketer
- Jahangir Khan, former squash player
- Wasim Akram, former captain of Pakistan cricket team
- Aleem Dar, international cricket umpire
- Aaqib Javed, former test cricketer and coach of Pakistan Team
- Khalid Mahmood, former captain of Pakistan Hockey Team
- Samiullah Khan, former captain of Pakistan Hockey Team
- Salim Sherwani, former captain of Pakistan hockey team
- Khawaja Zakauddin, former Olympian (hockey)
- Ashraf Ali, former test cricketer
- Asad Rauf, test umpire
- M.N. Jehan captain Pakistan football team

Journalists

- Hamid Nizami, founder of the Urdu newspaper Nawa-i-Waqt
- Majeed Nizami, editor-in-chief of Nawa-i-Waqt Group of Publication in Pakistan and a columnist
- Abdullah Malik, journalist and literary historian

Writers, poets and artists

- Qazi Abdur Rehman Amritsari poet and proposed name of Islamabad
- Majeed Amjad, Urdu poet
- Nasir Kazmi, Urdu poet
- Wasif Ali Wasif, Sufi author and poet
- Mumtaz Mufti, fiction writer
- Amjad Islam Amjad, poet and playwright
- Naseem Hijazi (real name, Mohammad Sharif), a Novelist
- Col. Muhammad Khan, novelist, humorist
- Raja Mehdi Ali Khan, a famous lyricist.
- Siddique Salik, writer
- Mirza Adeeb, writer, playwright and journalist
- Bashir Niaz, journalist, poet, story and screenwriter who won record 15 Nigar Awards
- Nanha, comedian of PTV and film

Industry

- Feroz Nizami music composer.
- Riaz Shahid, writer and film director
- Rafiq Ghaznavi pre partition filmi hero, singer and music director

== See also ==
- Fatima Begum (politician, born 1890) — helped establish the women's college in 1939
