= Shujauddin Siddiqi =

Indian cricketer and cricket umpire

Shujauddin Siddiqi (10 May 1919 – 21 July 2003) was an Indian first-class cricketer. After independence, he was a first-class and Test cricket umpire in Pakistan.

Siddiqi was born in Delhi. He played in seven Ranji Trophy matches for Delhi between 1939/40 and 1945/46, scoring 138 runs at a batting average of 12.54, and taking 12 wickets as a leg spinner at a bowling average of 28.75.

He umpired one first-class match in March 1946, the Ranji Trophy semi-final between Southern Punjab and Baroda. After nearly four days of play, the match was tied – Southern Punjab scored 167 in their first innings, and Baroda replied with 106. After Southern Punjab's second innings of 146, Baroda were bowled out for 207. Baroda won a coin toss to decide which team should go forward to meet Holkar in the final.

He moved to Pakistan after independence, where he continued to umpire in first-class matches, and also became a Test and ODI umpire. He appeared in 22 Tests spread over nearly 24 years, all played in Pakistan. His first Test as umpire was the match between Pakistan and India at Bahawalpur in January 1955. His last was also between Pakistan and India, at Karachi in November 1978. He stood in all three Tests in the MCC tour of Pakistan in 1968/9 which was marred by a series of riots. The final match, in Karachi, was abandoned during the third day due to crowd trouble, after England reached an imposing total of 502 for 7. Alan Knott was stranded on 96*, four runs short of his maiden Test century, as rioting crowds stormed the ground.

He umpired one ODI match, between Pakistan and India in Quetta in 1978, standing with Mahboob Shah.

He died in Karachi.

== See also ==
- List of Test cricket umpires
- List of One Day International cricket umpires
