= Pakistani cricket team in England in 1954 =

International cricket tour

	England	Pakistan
- Dates: 10 June – 17 August 1954

Test series
- Result: 4-match series drawn 1–1

The Pakistani cricket team toured England in the 1954 season, its first ever tour of the country since the creation of Pakistan in 1947. The team played four Test matches against England, winning one, losing one and drawing two. These were the first Test matches played between the two sides. In winning the fourth and final Test, Pakistan became the first side to win a Test on its inaugural tour of England.

The team played 26 other first-class matches and two minor games: they won eight of the first-class matches and one of the other games, and lost two first-class matches. In a wet summer, 19 matches, including two Tests and one of the minor games, were drawn.

== Test series summary ==
=== First Test ===
10–15 June 1954
(5-day match)
Scorecard

Pakistan	v	England
87 (83.5 overs); Hanif Mohammad 20; JB Statham 4/18 (13 overs)		117/9d (31 overs); RT Simpson 40; Khan Mohammad 5/61 (15 overs)
121 (52.2 overs); Waqar Hasan 53; TE Bailey 1/13 (6 overs)

Match drawn
Lord's, London
Umpires: TJ Bartley and D Davies

- England won the toss and elected to field.
- 13 June was taken as a rest day.
- There was no play on the first three days.
- Alimuddin, Khalid Wazir and Shujauddin (all PAK) made their Test debuts.

Play throughout the first Test match was limited to only eight hours, after heavy rain had saturated the outfield. It was the first time that the first three days of a match had been washed out at Lord's. Play began at 3:45pm on the fourth afternoon, and England captain Len Hutton won the toss and elected to bowl first. Pakistan scored slowly that afternoon, reaching fifty for three wickets; with Hanif Mohammad "scarcely ever attempting a scoring stroke" The following day, Pakistan's remaining seven wickets were taken in eighty minutes, with Brian Statham taking four wickets for ten runs in his morning spell. England took risks in attempting to score quick runs, hoping to declare and force an innings victory. However, England lost wickets regularly which interrupted the flow of their attack, and when Hutton declared England were 117 for 9. Pakistan managed to bat for the remainder of the match, securing the draw.

=== Second Test ===
1–5 July 1954
(5-day match)
Scorecard

Pakistan	v	England
157 (65 overs); AH Kardar 28; R Appleyard 5/51 (17 overs)		558/6d (139 overs); DCS Compton 278; Khan Mohammad 3/155 (40 overs)
272 (112.4 overs); Maqsood Ahmed 69; JH Wardle 3/44 (32 overs)

England won by an innings and 129 runs
Trent Bridge, Nottingham
Umpires: F Chester and TW Spencer

- Pakistan won the toss and elected to bat.
- 4 July was taken as a rest day.
- The match was scheduled for five days but completed in four.
- MEZ Ghazali, Aslam Khokhar and Khalid Hasan (all PAK), and R Appleyard (ENG) made their Test debuts.

Len Hutton was unfit, so David Sheppard captained the side in his absence. His opposite number Abdul Kardar won the toss and decided to bat first. After around an hour, Sheppard called upon Bob Appleyard to bowl for the first time in Test cricket. Within 26 balls, Appleyard reduced Pakistan from 37 for one to 55 for five, bowling a mixture of off cutters, leg cutters and inswingers. Despite a recovery from the tail, Pakistan were all out for 157. By the end of the first day, England had moved to 121/2, with Sheppard and May the dismissed batsmen. On the second morning, Pakistan bowler Fazal Mahmood injured his leg and had to bowl with a shortened run. Simpson was eventually dismissed for 101, while his batting partner Denis Compton was dropped on 20; he went on to score 278. Tom Graveney also scored a half-century, and England declared their innings on 558/6. Pakistan needed 401 to avoid an innings defeat, with two days play remaining. However, the rain fell again, reducing the playing time on the fourth day drastically. Nonetheless, Pakistan were all out for 272 just before lunch on day five.

=== Third Test ===
22–27 July 1954
(5-day match)
Scorecard

England	v	Pakistan
359/8d (129 overs); DCS Compton 93; Fazal Mahmood 4/107 (42 overs)		90 (56.5 overs); Hanif Mohammad 32; JH Wardle 4/19 (24 overs)
		25/4 (15 overs); Khalid Wazir 9* AV Bedser 3/9 (8 overs)

Match drawn
Old Trafford, Manchester
Umpires: F Chester and FS Lee

- England won the toss and elected to bat.
- 25 July was taken as a rest day.
- There was no play on the second, fourth or fifth days.
- JM Parks and JE McConnon (both ENG) made their Test debuts.

Sheppard, again deputising for Hutton, won the toss and elected to bat first. In yet another rain-affected match, England reached 293/6 by the close of the first day, with Compton making 93 and Graveney 65. Pakistan's bowling relied heavily on Shujauddin who bowled 37 overs that day. The second day fell entirely to rain, and on the third morning England batted for an hour before declaring. Pakistan started their reply well, but the rain-affected pitch favoured the bowlers. Pakistan lost wickets rapidly, with Johnny Wardle taking four for 19 and Jim McConnon, on his debut, three for 19 and four catches. The touring side were forced to follow on after being dismissed for 90. They limped to 25 for 4 in their second innings before the end of the third day, before the weather came to their rescue, washing out the final two days.

=== Fourth Test ===
12–17 August 1954
(5-day match)
Scorecard

Pakistan	v	England
133 (51.4 overs); AH Kardar 36; FH Tyson 4/35 (13.4 overs)		130 (59.3 overs); DCS Compton 53; Fazal Mahmood 6/53 (30 overs)
164 (92 overs); Wazir Mohammad 42; JH Wardle 7/56 (35 overs)		143 (68 overs); PBH May 53; Fazal Mahmood 6/46 (30 overs)

Pakistan won by 24 runs
The Oval, London
Umpires: D Davies and FS Lee

- Pakistan won the toss and elected to bat.
- 15 August was taken as a rest day.
- There was no play on the second day.
- FH Tyson and PJ Loader (both ENG) made their Test debuts.

Hutton returned, and England gave debuts to Peter Loader and Frank Tyson, who had been selected for the winter tour to Australia. Rain delayed the start and Pakistan were soon in trouble, falling to 51 for seven before Kardar and the tail effected a small recovery. Tyson and Loader took seven wickets between them. Torrential rain washed out the second day, and when England batted on the Saturday the pitch helped the Pakistani medium-fast bowlers, Fazal Mahmood and Mahmood Hussain, who took six and four wickets respectively. Every batsman was caught. For a second time, Pakistan were rescued by the tail, which doubled the score from 82 for eight to 164, with Wazir Mohammad making an unbeaten 43. Johnny Wardle took seven for 56 but lacked support. When Reg Simpson, Peter May and Denis Compton took England to 109 for two, an England victory looked a formality, but lower-order timidity against Fazal, who took a further six wickets to finish with 12 for 99 in the match, brought a famous victory after only 55 minutes on the fifth day.

== Annual reviews ==
- Playfair Cricket Annual 1955
- Wisden Cricketers' Almanack 1955
