= Asghar Ali (cricketer, born 1924) =

Indian cricketer

Personal information
- Full name: Syed Asghar Ali
- Born: 11 June 1924; Hyderabad, British India
- Died: 19 April 1979 (aged 54); Karachi, Pakistan
- Batting: Right-handed

Domestic team information
- Years: Team
- 1942–43 to 1948–49: Hyderabad
- 1953–54 to 1956–57: Karachi

Career statistics
Competition	First-class
Matches	32
Runs scored	1355
Batting average	28.22
100s/50s	1/8
Top score	103*
Balls bowled	24
Wickets	1
Bowling average	12.00
5 wickets in innings	0
10 wickets in match	0
Best bowling	1/3
Catches/stumpings	15/–
- Source: ESPNcricinfo, 17 January 2018

Syed Asghar Ali (11 June 1924 – 19 April 1979) was a cricketer who played first-class cricket in India from 1943 to 1949, and in Pakistan from 1949 to 1957.

A middle-order batsman, Asghar Ali's highest score was 103 not out in a team total of 182 for Hyderabad against Central Provinces and Berar in the 1947–48 Ranji Trophy. Nobody else in the match reached 50.

He played for Pakistan in two matches against the touring Ceylon team in 1949–50. He was named as a substitute for the Pakistan team that toured India in 1952–53, and was brought over to India at one stage, but did not play.
