= Imtiaz Ahmed (cricketer) =

Pakistani cricketer (1928–2016)

PP Imtiaz Ahmed

Personal information
- Born: 5 January 1928; Lahore, Punjab, British India
- Died: 31 December 2016 (aged 88); Lahore, Punjab, Pakistan
- Batting: Right-handed
- Bowling: Right-arm off-break
- Role: Wicket-keeper

International information
- National side: Pakistan (1952–1962)
- Test debut (cap 5): 16 October 1952 v India
- Last Test: 16 August 1962 v England

Domestic team information
- Years: Team
- 1944–1947: Northern India
- 1945–1947: North Zone (India)
- 1947: Punjab
- 1948–1949: Punjab University
- 1950: Pakistan Universities
- 1953–1964: Combined Services
- 1960: Rawalpindi
- 1960: North Zone cricket team (Pakistan)
- 1969–1972: Pakistan Air Force

Career statistics
Competition	Test	FC
Matches	41	180
Runs scored	2,079	10,393
Batting average	29.28	37.38
100s/50s	3/11	22/45
Top score	209	300*
Balls bowled	6	277
Wickets	0	4
Bowling average	–	41.50
5 wickets in innings	–	0
10 wickets in match	–	0
Best bowling	–	2/12
Catches/stumpings	77/16	322/82
- Source: CricketArchive, 26 June 2013

Imtiaz Ahmed PP (Urdu: امتیاز احمد), (5 January 1928 – 31 December 2016) was a cricketer who played for Pakistan's first Test team in 1952 and in 40 subsequent Test matches. He played in Pakistan's first 39 Test matches, setting a record for the most consecutive Tests played from a team's inaugural match.

His score of 209 for Pakistan against New Zealand in 1955 stood for almost 35 years as the highest score made by a wicket-keeper in Test cricket, until broken by his compatriot Taslim Arif (210*) in 2000.

== Biography ==
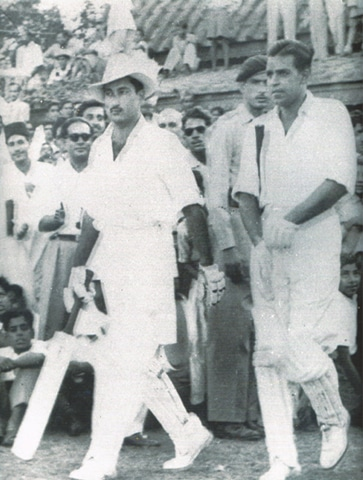
Waqar Hasan (left) and Imtiaz Ahmed (right) come out to bat during their second test against New Zealand, c. 1955.

Born in Lahore, Ahmed was educated at Islamia College Lahore. He played in 41 Tests and scored over 2000 runs. He was a middle order batsman who also sometimes batted in the top order. He was Pakistan's second Test wicketkeeper as Hanif Mohammad had kept wickets in Pakistan's inaugural Test. He made the first Test double hundred by a wicketkeeper when he scored 209 against New Zealand in October 1955.

On 6 March 1951, playing for India Prime Minister's XI against a Commonwealth XI, Ahmed scored a triple century (300 not out) while following on, a feat that has been achieved by only two others. He received Pride of Performance Award from the Government of Pakistan for sports in 1966.

Ahmed also played in the Ranji Trophy in India.

Ahmed died in Lahore, Punjab on 31 December 2016 due to a chest infection. He was 88 years old.

Preceded by Fazal Mahmood	Pakistan Cricket Captain; 1961–1962	Succeeded by Javed Burki
