= Khan Mohammad =

Pakistani cricketer (1928–2009)

- Khan Mohammad in 1954

Personal information
- Full name: Khan Mohammad
- Born: 1 January 1928; Lahore, Punjab, British India
- Died: 4 July 2009 (aged 81); London, England
- Batting: Right-handed
- Bowling: Right-arm fast-medium
- Role: Opening bowler

International information
- National side: Pakistan (1952–1958)
- Test debut (cap 8): 16 October 1952 v India
- Last Test: 31 March 1958 v West Indies

Domestic team information
- Years: Team
- 1947/48: Punjab
- 1947/48–1948/49: Punjab University
- 1949/50: Pakistan Universities
- 1951: Somerset
- 1953/54: Bahawalpur
- 1955/56: Sind
- 1956/57: Karachi Whites
- 1960/61: Lahore

Career statistics
Competition	Test	First-class
Matches	13	54
Runs scored	100	544
Batting average	10.00	11.57
100s/50s	0/0	0/1
Top score	26*	93
Balls bowled	3,157	10,496
Wickets	54	214
Bowling average	23.92	23.22
5 wickets in innings	4	16
10 wickets in match	0	1
Best bowling	6/21	7/56
Catches/stumpings	4/–	20/–
- Source: CricketArchive, 6 July 2009

Khan Mohammad (Punjabi, Urdu: خان محمد) (1 January 1928 – 4 July 2009) was a cricket player who was a member of Pakistan's first Test team that played against India in 1952. Born in Lahore, Punjab, he was educated at the city's Islamia College. He played in 13 Tests as an opening bowler who shared the new ball with Fazal Mahmood. He also holds the distinction of bowling Pakistan's first ball and taking Pakistan's first wicket in Test cricket.

He even once bowled Len Hutton in a Test match for a duck, at Lord's in 1954 – a rare feat among the cricketers of that time.

In 1951, Khan Mohammad made one appearance for Somerset, playing against the South Africans. He took five wickets in the match, and the intention appears to have been for him to qualify for the county by residence, which would have taken three years by the then rules, but he returned to Pakistan, when Test cricket started there 18 months later. He chose country over county, as his newly founded nation desperately needed experienced cricketers.

Khan Mohammad, who had been living in England during the last four decades, died of prostate cancer in London on 4 July 2009.
