= Maqsood Ahmed =

Pakistani cricketer (1925–1999)

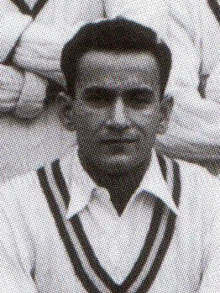
- Maqsood Ahmed in 1954

Personal information
- Born: 26 March 1925; Amritsar, British India
- Died: 4 January 1999 (aged 73); Rawalpindi, Pakistan
- Batting: Right-handed
- Bowling: Right-arm fast-medium
- Role: All-rounder

International information
- National side: Pakistan (1952–1955)
- Test debut (cap 9): 16 October 1952 v India
- Last Test: 26 October 1955 v New Zealand

Career statistics
Competition	Test	First-class
Matches	16	85
Runs scored	507	3,815
Batting average	19.50	31.52
100s/50s	0/2	6/22
Top score	99	144
Balls bowled	462	7,938
Wickets	3	124
Bowling average	63.66	27.86
5 wickets in innings	0	6
10 wickets in match	0	1
Best bowling	2/12	7/39
Catches/stumpings	13/–	47/–
- Source: ESPNcricinfo, 12 July 2019

Maqsood Ahmed (26 March 1925 – 4 January 1999) was a Pakistani cricketer who played in 16 Test matches from 1952 to 1955. He was educated at Islamia College, Lahore.

Maqsood Ahmed was a useful all-rounder in the first ever cricket team of Pakistan. Before the creation of Pakistan, he played for Southern Punjab in India, scoring 144 in his very first match. An aggressive hitter of the ball, Maqsood played a vital role in the recognition of Pakistan as test playing nation when he made 137 against the visiting MCC in 1951–52.

A right-handed middle-order batsman, Maqsood was a hard hitter of the ball and is one of the Test cricketers whose highest score was 99, which he made in the Third Test against India in 1954–55. Though a brilliant batsman, his performance in Test matches was rather irregular because of his carefree attitude. In England in 1952 he became the first Pakistani to play as a professional cricketer. The English press dubbed him "Merry Max".

He played 16 Test matches, scoring a total of 507 runs. He was also a right-arm medium fast bowler with three wickets in test matches to his credit. His first-class record is better, with 3815 runs in 85 matches between 1945 and 1964, including six centuries. He also took 124 wickets, with 7 for 39 and 6 for 44 against Sargodha in 1962–63 his best bowling figures. He was the leading bowler in the Quaid-i-Azam Trophy in 1962–63 with 34 wickets at an average of 9.29. He captained Karachi Blues and Rawalpindi in the Quaid-i-Azam Trophy.

After retiring from cricket, Maqsood Ahmed worked as a commentator and sports journalist for PTV, BBC and Radio Pakistan. He also served as the Chief National Cricket Coach and coached many Test stars including Intikhab Alam, Asif Iqbal, Mushtaq Mohammad, Sadiq Mohammad and Majid Khan. He was the Chairman of the National Selection Committee of the Pakistan Cricket Board which selected the World Cup winning team in 1991–92.

From independence to the time of his death he was associated with cricket in Pakistan and dedicated all his life and abilities for the promotion of Pakistan cricket. In recognition of his service one of the gates of the Rawalpindi Cricket Stadium carries his name, "Maqsood Ahmed Enclosure" and so does one of the benches at the Bagh-e-Jinnah Cricket Ground located inside the historic Lahore Gymkhana.

Maqsood Ahmed died on 4 January 1999 in Rawalpindi.

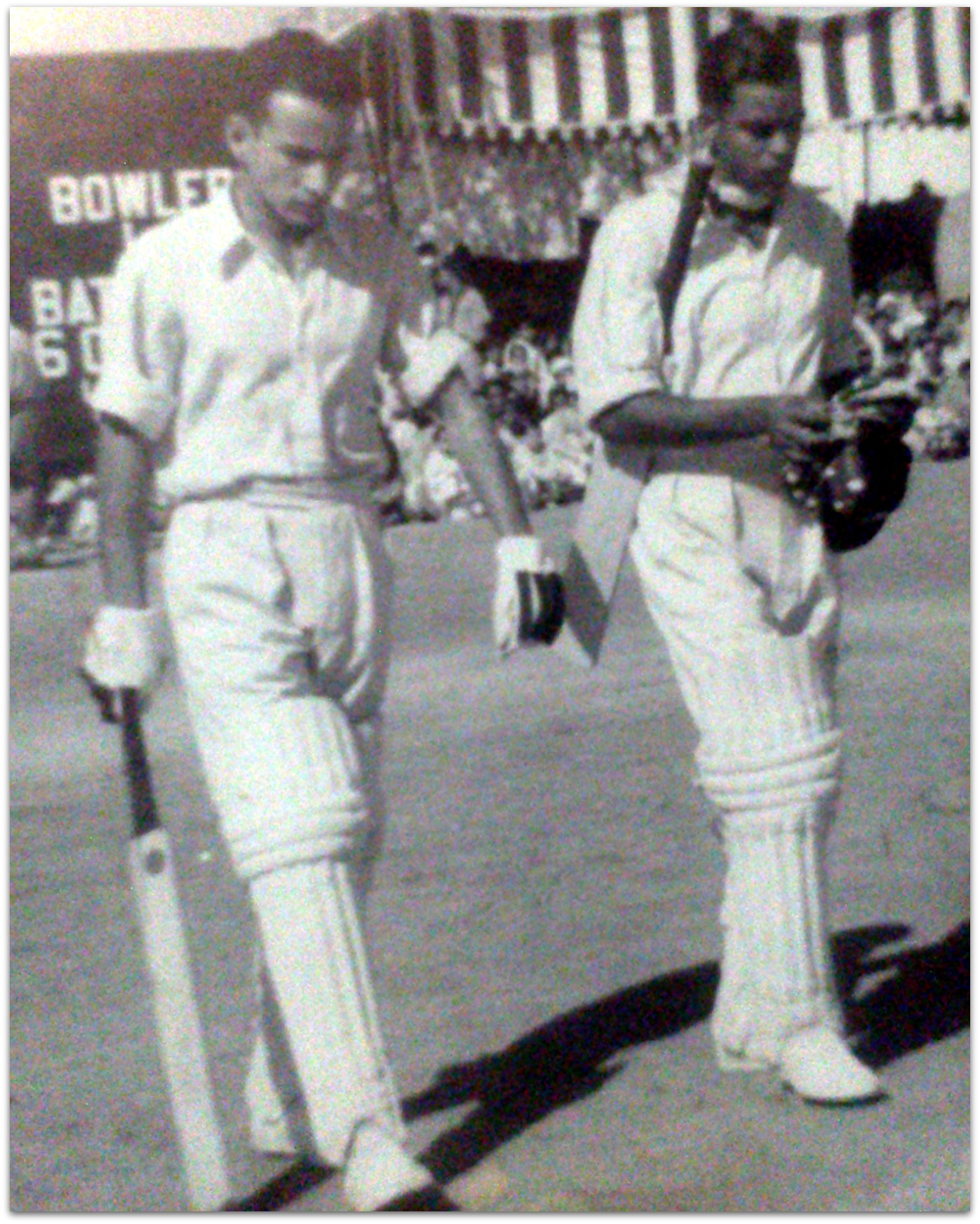
Maqsood Ahmed (left) with Imtiaz Ahmed

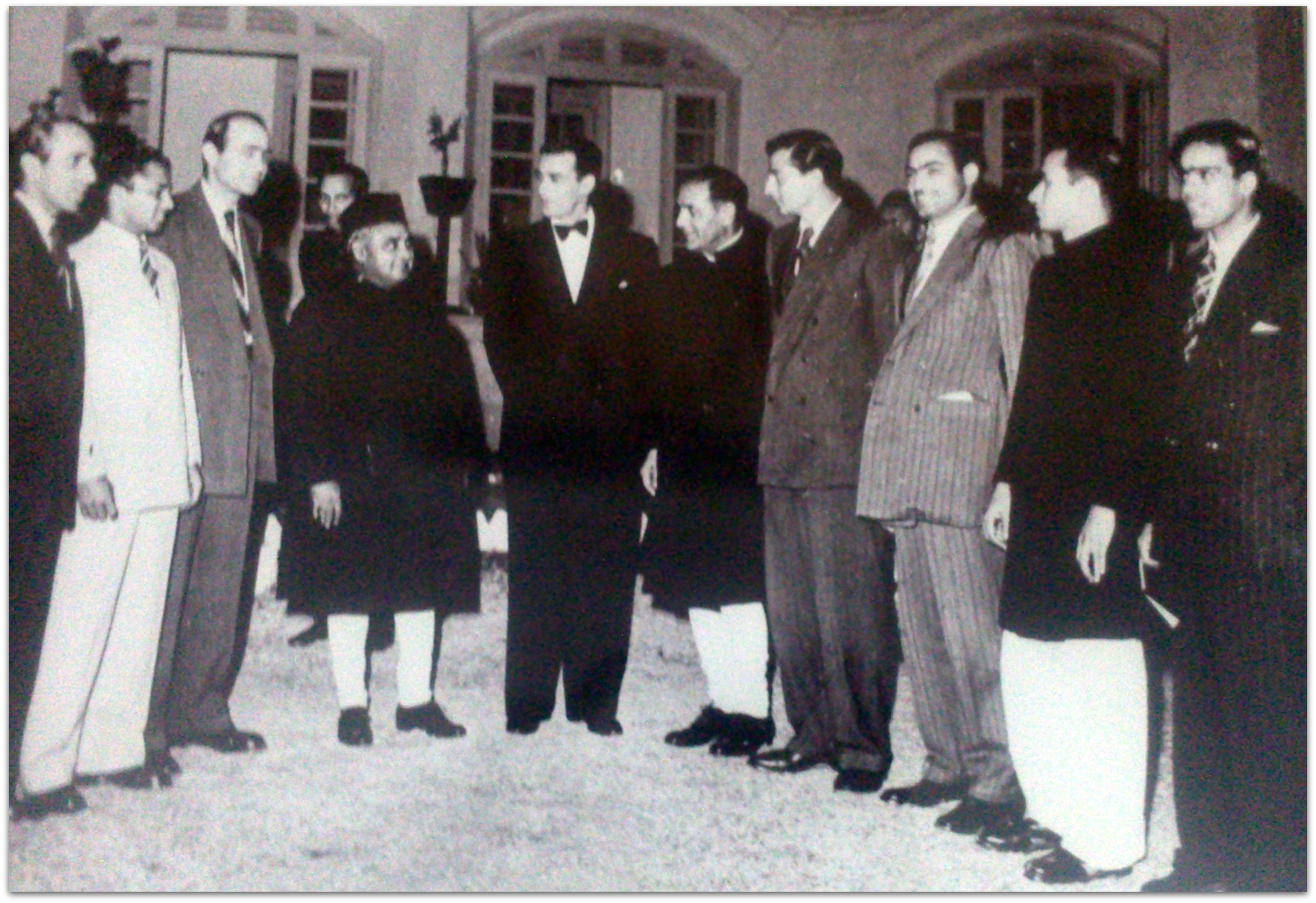
Pakistan Cricket team meets Governor General Khawaja Nazimuddin before departing for India – Maqsood Ahmed second from right
