= Fazal Mahmood =

Pakistani Test cricketer

PP, HI Fazal Mahmood

Personal information
- Full name: Fazal Mahmood
- Born: 18 February 1927; Lahore, Punjab, British India
- Died: 30 May 2005 (aged 78); Gulberg, Lahore, Pakistan
- Height: 6 ft 2 in (1.88 m)
- Batting: Right-handed
- Bowling: Right-arm fast-medium
- Role: Bowler
- Relatives: Yawar Saeed (brother-in-law); Mohammad Saeed (father-in-law)

International information
- National side: Pakistan (1952–1962)
- Test debut (cap 3): 16 October 1952 v India
- Last Test: 16 August 1962 v England

Domestic team information
- Years: Team
- 1943/44–1946/47: Northern India
- 1947/58–1956/57: Punjab (Pakistan)
- 1958/59: Lahore

Career statistics
Competition	Test	First-class
Matches	34	112
Runs scored	620	2,662
Batting average	14.09	23.35
100s/50s	0/1	1/13
Top score	60	100*
Balls bowled	9,834	25,932
Wickets	139	466
Bowling average	24.70	18.96
5 wickets in innings	13	38
10 wickets in match	4	8
Best bowling	7/42	9/43
Catches/stumpings	11/–	39/–
- Source: CricketArchive, 12 March 2009

Fazal Mahmood PP, HI (18 February 1927 – 30 May 2005) was a Pakistani international cricketer. He played in 34 Test matches and took 139 wickets at a bowling average of 24.70. The first Pakistani to pass 100 wickets, he reached the landmark in his 22nd match.

Fazal played his earliest first-class cricket for Northern India in the Ranji Trophy and strong performances there led to selection for India's inaugural tour of Australia in 1947–48. The independence of Pakistan, prior to the tour led Fazal, a Muslim, to withdraw and choose Pakistan. He played a major role in first gaining Test status for the new nation and then establishing them as a Test match team. He took ten wickets in a Test on four occasions; those against India, England and Australia coming in Pakistan's maiden victories over those teams. Fazal's most memorable performance came on the 1954 tour of England, when he had a leading role as Pakistan won at The Oval to square the series. He took match figures of 12/99, including 6/46 in the second innings as England collapsed chasing a target of 168.

Succeeding Abdul Kardar as captain, Fazal led the national team in 10 matches between 1959 and 1961. He had immediate success against the West Indies but after losing to Australia and a stalemate with India he was sacked as captain. In all Pakistan won two Tests and lost two under his leadership. He retired from Test and first-class cricket following the 1962 tour of England when he was called up to replace injured opening bowlers.

== Early life ==
Born in Lahore, Fazal attended Islamia College, Lahore, from the age of 13. His father, Ghulam Hussain, was a professor of economics at the college as well as being president of the college's cricket club.

Before settling for a career in academia, and despite passing the competitive Indian Civil Service exams, Ghulam Hussain joined the independence movement under the Islamic scholar and revolutionary activist Ubaidullah Sindhi, hoping to throw the British colonialists from a base in Afghanistan through an armed struggle.

He set Fazal a stringent training routine which involved waking at 4:30 am, walking five miles and running five miles. This schedule was adhered to for seven years. Fazal made the college first team in his second year and at the age of 15 took 5/13 in an inter-college final, a record for the tournament.

== First-class cricket ==
=== In British India ===
In March 1944, Fazal, aged 17 and still at college, made his first-class debut for Northern India. In a Ranji Trophy match against Southern Punjab he batted at number eleven scoring 38 not out and taking three wickets. His maiden first-class wicket was that of India Test all-rounder Lala Amarnath.

In Fazal's second appearance, a semi-final against Western India, he claimed eight wickets including 6/65 in the first innings.

After a quiet 1944–45 season, in which Fazal took five wickets at 18.20, his performances the following season almost led to a place on the 1946 tour of England. Playing in the Zonal Quadrangular Tournament, a competition which acted as a trial for the tour, he opened the bowling for North Zone with Amarnath and took match figures of 9/83. Indian captain Nawab of Pataudi wanted Fazal in the squad but he was considered too young by the other selectors. On the tourists return home they played two matches against a Rest of India XI, Fazal took seven wickets in the first match which the Rest won but was expensive in the second.

Later in the 1946–47 season his batting abilities were displayed when he scored his first and only first-class century. Playing for North Zone he scored exactly 100 not out from number eight, sharing in a 207-run seventh wicket partnership with Gogumal Kishenchand. North Zone won the match comfortably with Fazal contributing six wickets. He took a further five wickets in the final but North Zone lost by an innings. The zonal tournament had again acted as a trial, on this occasion for the country's inaugural tour of Australia in 1947–48. Fazal was included in the squad and attended the training camp, however before the tour began independence intervened and as a devout Muslim Fazal withdrew.

=== In Pakistan ===
The maiden first-class match in the newly formed country took place on 27 December 1947 between Punjab and Sind. Fazal played for Punjab, taking six wickets and scoring 60 in an innings victory. The match was the first time that Fazal opened the bowling alongside Khan Mohammad, his future new ball partner for Pakistan. The first international visitors to Pakistan were West Indies in November 1948. The last of three fixtures was against a representative side which contained Fazal, he failed to take a wicket in a drawn match. At the end of the 1948–49 season Pakistan toured Ceylon for four matches, Fazal was the leading wicket-taker with 20 wickets. On the return tour a year later he took 16 wickets in two matches.

A MCC side toured the subcontinent in 1951–52, playing a number of fixtures in Pakistan. In the first match against Punjab they were nearly forced to follow on after Fazal took 5/58. The fifth and final match of the tour was against a Pakistan side on a coir matting wicket at Karachi, Fazal exploited the surface to return figures of 6/40 in the MCC's first innings. The hosts went on to win by four wickets, a victory that played a large part in Pakistan gaining Test status. Pakistan were made Test members on 28 July 1952, less than five years after independence.

== Test career ==
=== First series ===
In October 1952, Pakistan began their first Test series against India. Fazal made his Test debut in the first match at Delhi, taking 2/92 in India's first innings, his maiden wicket was Indian captain, Lala Amarnath. Pakistan were dismissed cheaply twice to lose by an innings, Fazal was the only Pakistani player to reach double figures in both innings. Pakistan reversed the result in the second Test at Lucknow, played on a jute matting pitch Fazal took 5/52 in the first innings and 7/42 in the second as Pakistan won by an innings in only their second ever Test. His match figures of 12/94 are the best by a Pakistani bowler away from home, and were the best by any bowler against India until 1980.

In the third Test at Bombay Fazal was wicketless as Pakistan lost by ten wickets, although in their first innings he scored 33 batting at number eight, helping Pakistan recover from 60/6 to 143/7.

The final two Tests of the series were drawn, Fazal took six further wickets to finish his maiden series as Pakistan's leader wicket-taker with 20 at 25.60. He also made some lower order contributions finishing with a series total of 173 runs at 28.83.

=== England tour ===
A Pakistan Eaglets side, containing Fazal, was sent to England in 1953 in preparation for the following year's tour of the country. While in England, Fazal received coaching from retired England and Surrey fast bowler Alf Gover.

Fazal was made vice-captain to Abdul Kardar for the 1954 tour which would prove a success for both player and team on their first series outside the subcontinent. Fazal began the tour well, taking 11/102 and scoring 67 in the tourists first match against Worcestershire. He continued to take wickets in the lead up to the Test series, and also demonstrated his ability to bowl long and economical spells particularly against Oxford University where he bowled 37 maidens in 68 overs taking 7/95 in the process.

The first Test at Lord's was heavily affected by rain and drawn, batting was difficult in the play that was possible and Pakistan were dismissed for 87 in their first innings. England in response scored 117/9 declared with Fazal and Khan Mohammad bowling throughout the innings, Fazal recording figures of 4/54. In the tour match before the next Test Pakistan played Nottinghamshire at Trent Bridge, the tourists won by eight wickets with Fazal taking 11 wickets including a then career best 8/66 in the first innings. The second Test was at the same venue but saw contrasting fortunes as the Pakistanis suffered a heavy innings defeat and Fazal recorded his worst Test figures of 0/148. Although he was suffering with a leg injury which forced him to shorten his run-up. Pakistan faced another innings defeat after three days of the third Test but the match was drawn after rain stopped any play on the final two days, Fazal took 4/107 from 42 overs in England's innings.

Pakistan went to the fourth and final Test at The Oval 1–0 down but caused a major upset by beating England to level the series, it was the first occasion that a country had won a Test in England on their inaugural tour. Fazal played a leading role in the victory claiming match figures of 12/99. In England's first innings he bowled throughout taking 6/53 from 30 overs, Wisden wrote the figures 'would have been much better but for dropped catches'. In a low scoring match, England were set a target of 168 in their second innings. Despite the early loss of Len Hutton, for the second time in the match caught behind off the bowling of Fazal, at 109/2 England looked well set on the fourth evening. However Fazal took the wickets of Peter May, Godfrey Evans and Denis Compton before the close and the next day took the first two wickets to fall as Pakistan completed a 24-run victory. Fazal's finished with second innings figures of 6/46 from 30 overs.

In the series Fazal took 20 wickets, 12 more than the next best Pakistani bowler, at an average of 20.40. He played in only one of the six first-class matches that concluded the tour but still finished as leading wicket-taker with 77 at 17.53. In recognition of his feats, Fazal was named a Wisden Cricketer of the Year in 1955, the first Pakistani to be honoured.

=== Home series ===
Pakistan's first home series came in the 1954–55 season with the visit of India for five Test matches. The series was marked by defensive and dull cricket with all five matches being drawn, the first occurrence of this in Test history. Fazal played in four of the matches and took 15 wickets at 21.93. His best figures came in the fifth Test at Karachi where he took 5/48 in India's first innings.

Later in 1955 New Zealand made their maiden tour to the country, Pakistan completed a first Test series victory, winning 2–0. Fazal played in two of the three Tests and took five wickets at 18.40.

Australia was the next visitors to Pakistan, touring in October 1956 for a single Test prior to their series in India and following the tour of England. In the match at Karachi, Pakistan secured a historic victory in their first Test against Australia. Fazal played a major role in the win, taking Test best figures of 13/114. He took the first six wickets to fall in Australia's first innings leaving the tourists on 52/6, a position they failed to recover from, they were 80 all out. He also took the first four wickets in the second innings and finished with 7/80.

Wisden described his technique: "maintaining an accurate length and varying his swing with a mixture of leg-cutters and breakbacks". Imtiaz Ahmed said that: "Fazal never wavered in length and direction, and he moved the ball both ways intelligently...For one whole over from Fazal in the first innings, even the great Miller had no clue."

=== Tour of West Indies ===
Pakistan's tour of the West Indies in 1958 was marked by a number of high scoring Test matches and Fazal had a large workload, sending down over 320 overs in the five Test series including 186 in consecutive Tests. Pakistan lost the series 3–1 and only avoided defeat in the first Test thanks to the 16-hour innings of 337 by Hanif Mohammad.

In the second Test at Trinidad Fazal was Pakistan's most economical bowler collecting six wickets in the process, while as batsman he scored 60 from number 10, his highest Test score and only fifty at international level.

The third Test at Kingston was historic as Gary Sobers scored 365 not out, breaking the Test record for highest individual score. Injuries to fellow opening bowler Mahmood Hussain and spinner Nasim-ul-Ghani meant that Fazal sent down 85.2 overs, what Wisden described as 'a phenomenal number of overs for a bowler of his pace'. Fazal conceded 247 runs in the innings and took the only two wickets to fall.

Fazal's bowling analysis places him fifth in Test history for most overs bowled and most runs conceded in an innings. Pakistan lost the Test by an innings and by losing the next match in Guyana they lost the series.

Pakistan achieved a consolation victory in the fifth Test, Fazal taking 6/83 in the first innings including the wicket of Conrad Hunte with the first ball of the match. Fazal finished the series with 20 wickets at 38.20, despite being one of his worst in terms of average, he was still Pakistan's leading wicket-taker.

=== Captaincy ===
By the time of the return tour the following year, Abdul Kardar, captain of Pakistan since their Test election, had retired from Test cricket. Fazal, the nation's leading bowler, succeeded him in the role. In his first Test as captain he won the toss and decided to field, opening the bowling he took the wicket of Conrad Hunte in the first over for the second successive Test. Fazal finished the innings with figures of 4/32 which also included dismissing Gary Sobers for a duck. Fazal took three further wickets in the second innings including both Hunte and Sobers, the latter's wicket was Fazal's 100th in Test cricket, the first Pakistani to reach the landmark. Pakistan completed a ten wicket victory to give their new captain a winning start. Pakistan also won the next Test at Dhaka and therefore completed a series win in the three match rubber. In a low scoring match Fazal played an instrumental role, taking ten wickets in a match for the fourth time in Tests. Put in to bat, Pakistan recovered from 22/5 to make 145. West Indies fared worse, being dismissed for 76 following a collapse of six wickets for 11 runs. Fazal bowled throughout the innings, taking 6/34. West Indies, set 214 in their fourth innings, fell 41 runs short. Fazal taking six of the first seven wickets, the other dismissal that of Sobers by Mahmood Hussain involved Fazal as the catcher. Mahmood finished off the tail to claim four wickets while Fazal ended with figures of 6/66 and a match analysis of 12/100. The latter were the best figures by a bowler whilst captain until 1993, when bettered by Waqar Younis. The third Test, a dead rubber, was won by the West Indies. Fazal dismissed both openers but these were his only wickets in 40 overs. He was the leading wicket-taker in the series with 21 at 15.85.

Australia toured Pakistan at the end of 1959 for a three Test series which they won 2–0, Pakistan's first series defeat at home. In the first Test at Dacca the tourists won by eight wickets, Fazal claimed six wickets including a first innings five-for, 5/71. He missed the second Test at his home city of Lahore, wicket-keeper Imtiaz Ahmed taking over captaincy duties in a match Australia won by seven wickets. Fazal returned for the third Test in Karachi and took another five wicket haul with 5/74 in Australia's first innings. Pakistan gained a lead on first innings but after three early wickets their second innings slowed and the match petered out to a draw. Despite missing a match Fazal was Pakistan's leading wicket-taker for the series, taking 11 at 19.36. These efforts led him to achieve the number 1 ranking in ICC Test Bowlers ranking for 1959.

Pakistan toured India during the 1960–61 season but with little reward as all 15 matches on their tour, including five Tests, were drawn. Just as seven years previous, the series contained dour and defensive cricket as both sides appeared intent on avoiding defeat rather than attempting to win. Fazal won the toss in the first four Tests but only in the third Test at Eden Gardens did Pakistan gain a first innings lead. In that match Fazal took 5/26 off 25.3 overs, but he failed to take a wicket in India's second innings as they batted out time comfortably. Apart from that five-for, his 13th and last in Test cricket, Fazal took only four other wickets in the series. Fazal's captaincy received severe criticism with accusations of favouritism, and following the final Test he was sacked as captain.

=== Final Tests ===
Fazal wasn't initially selected by Pakistan for the home series against England but returned for the final Test. He was as economical as ever, conceding 98 runs from his 63 overs, but failed to take a wicket. He wasn't included in the 1962 tour squad to England but was called up as a replacement when fast bowlers Mahmood Hussain and Mohammad Farooq broke down injured. The five match series already lost, Fazal came into the team for the fourth Test at Trent Bridge. He shouldered much of the workload, bowling for all but 30 minutes of the second day and continuing throughout on the third morning until the England declaration, from his 60 overs he took 3/130. In the fifth Test at The Oval, he was expensive taking 2/192 from 47 overs, the two wickets, which proved to be his last in Test cricket, were those of Colin Cowdrey (182) and Ted Dexter (172).

== League cricket ==
=== Lancashire League ===
Fazal spent three seasons as the professional with the East Lancashire Cricket Club in 1957, 1958, and 1959. Playing against albeit excellent amateur cricketers his bowling was devastating. In three memorable seasons he took 4 hat-tricks, with 8 wickets on 2 occasions and 7 wickets on 6 occasions, including 7 for 9 in 1959, and 7 for 26 in 1957.

== Beyond cricket ==
=== Police ===
After leaving Islamia College with a master's degree in economics, Fazal joined the Pakistan Services as an Inspector of Police in 1947 rising to Deputy Superintendent in 1952 and Deputy Inspector General in 1976.

=== Cinema ===
Due to his good looks, he had many movie offers : during Pakistan's first tour of India, in 1952–1953, famous director Mehboob Khan offered him a second-lead role in the movie Aan (1952), while well-known American director George Cukor, while on a visit in Lahore and meeting Mahmood, said he would have preferred him as the lead role in his 1956-movie Bhowani Junction, instead of Stewart Granger. He refused them to concentrate on cricket.

=== Religion ===
Quitting cricket, he also became more religious in his outlook, and notably published, in 1970, the book Urge To Faith, where he outlines his vision of applying Islamic principles to the economy and social system of Pakistan, and which has been described by journalist Peter Oborne as "a meditation on religion, philosophy and politics. The book demonstrates a profound faith and learning, containing many relevant quotations from the Quran. Fazal doubted whether 'a democracy of western type' was capable of bringing about Islamic justice." He also acted as a muezzin for the local mosque in his old age, and established a school for girls, the Sidra Model School, using the plot of rural land he was gifted after the 1954 Oval victory.

== Death ==
Fazal suffered a fatal heart attack at his Lahore residence on 30 May 2005. His friend and former teammate Hanif Mohammad described Fazal as a "great human being" and "the doyen of Pakistan bowlers in the country's formative years".

His autobiography has been published by the Oxford University Press, in 2003, as From Dusk to Dawn: Autobiography of a Pakistan Cricket Legend.

Fazal Mahmood was married to the daughter of Mohammad Saeed, Pakistani cricket's captain.

== Records and statistics ==
Fazal was the first bowler in the history of Test cricket to take 12 or more wickets in a Test match against four different countries, those being India, England, Australia, and West Indies. He reached 100 Test wickets in 22 Tests, of Pakistan bowlers only Waqar Younis and Mohammad Asif reached the landmark quicker.

== Books ==
- Urge to Faith, Lion Art Press, 1970, 352 p.
- From Dusk to Dawn: Autobiography of a Pakistan Cricket Legend, Oxford University Press, 2003, 241 p.

== Awards and recognition ==
- Pride of Performance Award in 1958 by the Government of Pakistan
- In 2012, he was posthumously awarded Hilal-i-Imtiaz in recognition of his contribution to Pakistan's cricket.

Preceded by Abdul Kardar	Pakistan cricket captain 1959–1961	Succeeded by Imtiaz Ahmed
