= Punjab University cricket team =

Cricket team

Personnel
- Owner: University of the Punjab

Team information
- Home ground: Punjab University Ground, Lahore

Punjab University cricket team, representing the University of the Punjab in Lahore, played first-class cricket in Pakistan from 1947–48 to 1971–72.

== Early matches ==
The annual match in Lahore between Punjab University and the Punjab Governor's XI began in 1928–29. Punjab University competed in the Rohinton Baria Trophy between 1935–36 and 1946–47, winning four times and coming runners-up four times.

After the formation of Pakistan in 1947, Punjab University played the second first-class match in Pakistan when their match against the Punjab Governor's XI at Bagh-e-Jinnah, Lahore in February 1948 was given first-class status. Batting for Punjab University, Maqsood Ahmed scored the third century in Pakistan first-class cricket. The contest was repeated in 1948–49, 1950–51 and 1951–52, at a time before the organisation of first-class competitive cricket in Pakistan, when there were few other first-class matches. The Punjab Governor's XI won the third match, and the other three were drawn. The Punjab Governor's XI included several leading Pakistan players, including Fazal Mahmood and Mohammad Saeed.

== First-class university matches ==
Punjab University next played first-class cricket when the Inter-Universities Championship was given first-class status in 1958-59 and 1959–60. In the first match Punjab University amassed a first-innings total of 702 against Sind University, with four players scoring centuries. Karachi University beat Punjab University in the final. In 1959-60 Punjab University beat Peshawar University narrowly in the first match, then again lost to Karachi University in the final.

== 1960s and 1970s ==
The match against the Punjab Governor's XI at Bagh-e-Jinnah was played six more times between 1960–61 and 1970–71. It continued to carry great tradition and prestige. The first two matches were drawn, and the Punjab Governor's XI won the last four. Among the many Test players who played for the Punjab Governor's XI in this period was Abdul Hafeez Kardar, who captained the side in 1965–66 in his final first-class match.

Punjab University competed at first-class level in the Ayub Trophy in 1960–61, 1964–65, 1965–66, 1967–68 and 1969–70, the Quaid-i-Azam Trophy in 1964-65 (under the name of "Punjab University and Lahore Education Board"), 1969–70 and 1970–71, the BCCP Trophy in 1970-71 and 1971–72, and the Punjab Governor's Gold Cup Tournament in 1971–72. They reached the semi-finals of several tournaments, progressing to the final of the Quaid-i-Azam Trophy in 1970–71, which they lost on the first innings to Karachi Blues, and defeating Rawalpindi to win the Punjab Governor's Gold Cup Tournament in 1971–72. Their last match was a semi-final of the Quaid-i-Azam Trophy in 1971–72.

Overall between 1948 and 1972 Punjab University played 44 first-class matches, winning 8, losing 10 and drawing 26. They played 20 of these matches at the university ground.

== Notable players ==
Many Pakistan Test players spent part of their early careers playing for Punjab University, including Shujauddin Butt, Khan Mohammad, Imtiaz Ahmed and Waqar Hasan in the early matches, and Sarfraz Nawaz, Wasim Raja, Asif Masood, Shafiq Ahmed and Talat Ali in the 1960s and 1970s.
