= Bahawalpur cricket team =

Cricket team in Bahawalpur, Pakistan

Bahawalpur cricket team is a first-class cricket side in Pakistan, representing the city of Bahawalpur and its region in the southern part of the Punjab province.

Bahawalpur won the inaugural season of the Quaid-e-Azam Trophy in 1953–54, under the captaincy of Khan Mohammad. The team competed in Pakistan's first-class competitions in most seasons between 1953–54 and 2002–03. After nine seasons in the sub-first-class Inter-District Tournament, Bahawalpur returned to first-class status for the 2012–13 and 2013–14 seasons. After another hiatus, Bahawalpur (as Bahawalpur Region) returned to the Quaid-e-Azam Trophy in 2024–25.

At the start of November 2025, Bahawalpur had played 228 first-class matches, with 58 wins, 85 losses, 83 draws and 2 ties. Bahawalpur's Twenty20 and List A cricket team is known as Bahawalpur Stags.

== Honours ==
Bahawalpur have won the Quaid-e-Azam Trophy twice.

- 1953–54
- 1957–58
