= Pakistan Railways cricket team =

Cricket team

Pakistan Railways (usually known simply as Railways) were a Pakistani first-class cricket side who played in the Patron's Trophy and Quaid-i-Azam Trophy from 1953-54 to 1995–96. They were based in the city of Lahore and sponsored by Pakistan Railways.

== Playing record ==
The team's most successful season came in 1973-74 when they claimed both trophies in a side captained by Arif Butt. Other Pakistani internationals in the side included Saleem Pervez and Mohammad Nazir.

In December 1964 Railways set a new first-class cricket record for the greatest winning margin in a match. Batting first they made 6 for 910 declared and then bowled out their opponents Dera Ismail Khan for 32 and 27 to win by an innings and 851 runs. In that match Pervez Akhtar made 337 not out, and Ahad Khan took 9 wickets for 7, both of which remained Railways' best batting and bowling figures.

They played 204 first-class matches, with 68 wins, 68 losses, 67 draws and one tie.

== Other Railways teams ==
Twice, owing to their playing strength, Pakistan Railways were split into two teams. Altogether these four teams played 15 matches, with three wins, five losses and seven draws.

In 1965-66 the two teams were Railways Greens and Railways Reds. Railways Greens played two matches, drawing both. Railways Reds played four matches, winning one, losing one and drawing two, and reaching the semi-finals of the Ayub Trophy.

In 1970-71 and 1971-72 the two teams were Railways A and Railways B. Railways A played five matches, winning two, losing one and drawing two. Railways B played four matches, losing three and drawing one.

== Current status ==
Pakistan Railways continue to play in non-first-class competitions in Pakistan.

== Honours ==
- Patron's Trophy (2)
- 1960-61
- 1973-74
- Quaid-i-Azam Trophy (2)
- 1972-73
- 1973-74
