= Punjab cricket team (Pakistan) =

Cricket team

Personnel
- Owner: Punjab Cricket Association

Team information
- Founded: 1953-54
- Home ground: Gaddafi Stadium, Lahore, Punjab, Pakistan
- Secondary home ground(s): Iqbal Stadium, Faisalabad, Punjab, Pakistan

History
- Quaid-e-Azam Trophy wins: 2 (1956–57) (1974–75)
- Pentangular Trophy wins: 1 (2011-12)

The Punjab cricket team was a cricket team representing the Punjab region in Pakistan first-class cricket. Punjab teams played in the Quaid-i-Azam Trophy from its inception in 1953–54 to 1957–58, then in the Pentangular Trophy and Quaid-i-Azam Trophy from 1972–73 to 1978–79, then in the Pentangular Cup from 2007–08 to 2011–12. They also won the inaugural 2008–09 Pentangular One Day Cup.

Apart from Punjab itself, Punjab A, Punjab B, Punjab Greens and Punjab Whites also represented the province in the Quaid-i-Azam Trophy. Punjab won the Trophy in 1956–57, Punjab A won it in 1974–75, and Punjab won the Pentangular Cup in 2011–12.
