= Quaid-e-Azam Trophy =

First-class cricket tournament in Pakistan since 1953

Quaid-e-Azam Trophy جام قائد اعظم
- Tournament logo
- Countries: Pakistan
- Administrator: Pakistan Cricket Board
- Format: First-class
- First edition: 1953–54
- Latest edition: 2025–26
- Number of teams: 18
- Current champion: Karachi Blues (10th title)
- Most successful: Karachi Blues (10 titles)
- TV: List of Broadcasters
- Website: www.pcb.com.pk

The Quaid-e-Azam Trophy is a domestic first-class cricket competition in Pakistan. With few exceptions, it has been staged annually since it was first played during the 1953–54 season. Domestic cricket in Pakistan has undergone many reorganisations, with the number of teams and matches in the Quaid-e-Azam Trophy changing regularly. It has been variously contested by associations (Note: Cricket associations representing regions, provinces, districts or cities.) or departments, (Note: Institutions, corporations or government departments.) or a combination of the two. Since 2019 it has been contested by regional teams only.

== History ==
Named after Muhammad Ali Jinnah, the founder of Pakistan and the first Governor-General of Pakistan (from 1947 to 1948), who was known as "Quaid-e-Azam" (Great Leader), the trophy was introduced in the 1953–54 season to help the selectors pick the squad for Pakistan's Test tour of England in 1954. Five regional and two departmental teams competed in the first competition: Bahawalpur, Punjab, Karachi, North-West Frontier Province, Sindh, Combined Services and Pakistan Railways.

The Quaid-e-Azam Trophy has been contested by a variety of teams representing regional cricket associations and departments. The departmental teams were run by companies, institutions and government departments, and offered employment for their players. In most seasons up to 2019 a mixture of the two competed together, but on many occasions the competition has been contested exclusively by regional or departmental teams. Due to their strength in depth, several regional associations have entered multiple teams, starting in 1956–57 when Karachi, Punjab and East Pakistan each had two teams. The competition's format has seldom remained unchanged from one season to the next. It was a knockout tournament for the first two seasons, and again in 1959–60, from 1963–64 to 1968–69, and from 1970–71 to 1978–79. At other times it has been contested in one or more round robin groups with another group stage, knockout or single final match between the top sides in each group, and as a two division league system with a knockout and/or final and promotion and relegation. Even when the system remained constant, the composition of teams from the regions and departments often changed. Karachi teams have won the trophy 20 times, the most by any team.

Ahead of the 2019–20 season the Pakistan Cricket Board announced a new structure which removed the traditional regions and departments, with six newly formed regional teams contesting the Quaid-e-Azam Trophy. In January 2023, the Pakistan Cricket Board, adverting to "the wrong policies of the past four seasons", announced that the PCB constitution had been changed. Pakistan domestic cricket would revert to what the PCB called its "tried, tested and winning cricket model and structure". Eight regional teams competed in the 2023–24 competition: Faisalabad, Federally Administered Tribal Areas, Karachi Whites, Lahore Blues, Lahore Whites, Multan, Peshawar and Rawalpindi.

For the 2024–25 competition the number of teams was increased to 18, in three pools of six teams each.

- Pool A: Abbottabad Region, Faisalabad Region, Hyderabad Region, Islamabad Region, Lahore Region Whites, Larkana Region
- Pool B: Azad Jammu and Kashmir Region, Bahawalpur Region, Karachi Region Whites, Multan Region, Peshawar Region, Rawalpindi Region
- Pool C: Dera Murad Jamali, Federally Administered Tribal Areas Region, Karachi Region Blues, Lahore Region Blues, Quetta Region, Sialkot Region

For 2025–26 the number of teams was reduced to ten: Abbottabad, Bahawalpur, Faisalabad, Federally Administered Tribal Areas, Islamabad, Karachi Blues, Lahore Whites, Multan, Peshawar, Sialkot.

== Winners and competition details ==
Season	Winning team(s)	Runner-up	Number of teams			Total matches (Note: "Total matches" includes matches scheduled but not played.)	Format
Season	Winning team(s)	Runner-up	Tot.	Rgn.	Dpt.	Total matches	Format
1953–54	Bahawalpur (1)	Punjab	7	5	2	6	knockout; semi-finals
1954–55	Karachi (1)	Combined Services	9	7	2	8	knockout; semi-finals
1955–56	Not held						
1956–57	Punjab (1)	Karachi Whites	13	11	2	18	4 round-robin groups; semi-finals
1957–58	Bahawalpur (2)	Karachi C	15	13	2	26	4 round-robin groups; semi-finals
1958–59	Karachi (2)	Combined Services	12	9	3	16	4 round-robin groups; semi-finals
1959–60	Karachi (3)	Lahore	13	10	3	12	knockout; quarter-finals
1960–61	Not held due to the holding of inaugural Ayub Trophy.						
1961–62	Karachi Blues (1)	Combined Services	15	13	2	28	4 round-robin groups; semi-finals
1962–63	Karachi A (1)	Karachi B	16	13	3	27	4 round-robin groups; semi-finals
1963–64	Karachi Blues (2)	Karachi Whites	15	13	2	14	knockout; quarter-finals
1964–65	Karachi Blues (3)	Lahore	26	18	8	24	knockout; semi-finals
1965–66	Not held due to the Indo-Pakistani War of 1965.						
1966–67	Karachi (4)	Pakistan Railways	7	6	1	6	knockout; semi-finals
1967–68	Not held due to the 1966–67 competition extending until November 1967.						
1968–69	Lahore (1)	Karachi	12	11	1	11	knockout; quarter-finals
1969–70	PIA (1)	PWD	20	15	5	34	5 round-robin groups; pre-semi-final
1970–71	Karachi Blues (4)	Punjab University	20	11	9	19	knockout; semi-finals
1971–72	Not held due to the Indo-Pakistani War of 1971.						
1972–73	Railways (1)	Sind	7	4	3	6	knockout; semi-finals
1973–74	Railways (2)	Sind	7	4	3	6	knockout; semi-finals
1974–75	Punjab A (1)	Sind A	10	6	4	9	knockout; quarter-finals
1975–76	National Bank (1)	Punjab A	10	6	4	9	knockout; quarter-finals
1976–77	United Bank (1)	National Bank	12	6	6	11	knockout; quarter-finals
1977–78	Habib Bank (1)	National Bank	12	6	6	11	knockout; quarter-finals
1978–79	National Bank (2)	Habib Bank	12	4	8	11	knockout; quarter-finals
1979–80	PIA (2)	National Bank	11	3	8	18	4 groups; final round-robin
1980–81	United Bank (2)	PIA	10	2	8	45	round-robin
1981–82	National Bank (3)	United Bank	10	3	7	45	round-robin
1982–83	United Bank (3)	National Bank	10	3	7	45	round-robin
1983–84	National Bank (4)	United Bank	10	0	10	45	round-robin
1984–85	United Bank (4)	Pakistan Railways	12	2	10	33	2 round-robin groups; semi-finals
1985–86	Karachi (5)	Pakistan Railways	12	6	6	66	round-robin
1986–87	National Bank (5)	United Bank	12	4	8	66	round-robin
1987–88	PIA (3)	United Bank	13	4	9	39	2 round-robin groups; semi-finals
1988–89	ADBP (1)	Habib Bank	8	0	8	29	round-robin; final
1989–90	PIA (4)	United Bank	8	0	8	57	round-robin; final
1990–91	Karachi Whites (1)	Bahawalpur	8	8	0	31	round-robin; semi-finals
1991–92	Karachi Whites (2)	Lahore	9	9	0	39	round-robin; semi-finals
1992–93	Karachi Whites (3)	Sargodha	8	8	0	31	round-robin; semi-finals
1993–94	Lahore ()	Karachi Whites	8	8	0	31	round-robin; semi-finals
1994–95	Karachi Blues (5)	Lahore	10	10	0	48	round-robin; semi-finals
1995–96	Karachi Blues (6)	Karachi Whites	10	10	0	48	round-robin; semi-finals
1996–97	Lahore (2)	Karachi Whites	8	8	0	31	round-robin; semi-finals
1997–98	Karachi Blues (7)	Peshawar	10	10	0	46	round-robin; final
1998–99	Peshawar (1)	Karachi Whites	11	11	0	56	round-robin; final
1999–00	PIA (5)	Habib Bank	23	11	12	122	2 round-robin groups; final
2000–01	Lahore Blues (1)	Karachi Whites	12	12	0	67	round-robin; final
2001–02	Karachi Whites (4)	Peshawar	18	18	0	73	2 round-robin groups; final
2002–03	PIA (6)	KRL	24	13	11	75	4 round-robin groups; pre-quarter-finals
2003–04	Faisalabad (1)	Sialkot	9	9	0	36	round-robin
2004–05	Peshawar (2)	Faisalabad	11	11	0	56	round-robin; final
2005–06	Sialkot (1)	Faisalabad	7	7	0	22	round-robin; final
2006–07	Karachi Urban (1)	Sialkot	7	7	0	22	round-robin; final
2007–08	SNGPL (1)	Habib Bank	22	13	9	111	2 round-robin groups; final
2008–09	Sialkot (2)	KRL	22	13	9	111	2 round-robin groups; final
2009–10	Karachi Blues (8)	Habib Bank	22	13	9	111	2 round-robin groups; final
2010–11	Habib Bank (2)	PIA	22	13	9	113	2 round-robin divisions; 2 finals
2011–12	PIA (7)	ZTBL	22	13	9	113	2 round-robin divisions; 2 finals
2012–13	Karachi Blues (9)	Sialkot	14	14	0	62	2 round-robin groups; 4 round-robin pools; 2 finals
2013–14	Rawalpindi (1)	Islamabad	14	14	0	61	2 round-robin groups; 4 round-robin pools; final
2014–15	SNGPL (2)	National Bank	26	14	12	116	2 divisions: round-robin, then final in Gold; 2 round-robin groups, quarter-finals in Silver
2015–16	SNGPL (3)	United Bank	16	8	8	62	2 round-robin groups; 4 round-robin pools; 2 finals
2016–17	WAPDA (1)	Habib Bank	16	8	8	69	2 round-robin divisions; 2 round-robin "Super Eight" groups of four; final
2017–18	SNGPL (4)	WAPDA	16	8	8	69	2 round-robin divisions; 2 round-robin "Super Eight" groups of four; final
2018–19	Habib Bank (3)	SNGPL	16	8	8	69	2 round-robin divisions; 2 round-robin "Super Eight" groups of four; final
2019–20	Central Punjab (1)	Northern	6	6	0	31	round-robin; final
2020–21	Central Punjab (2); Khyber Pakhtunkhwa (1)	n/a (Note: Central Punjab and Khyber Pakhtunkhwa shared the title after the final resulted in a tie.)	6	6	0	31	round-robin; final
2021–22	Khyber Pakhtunkhwa (2)	Northern	6	6	0	31	round-robin; final
2022–23	Northern (1)	Sindh	6	6	0	31	round-robin; final
2023–24	Karachi Whites (5)	Faisalabad	8	8	0	29	round-robin; final
2024–25	Sialkot (3)	Peshawar	18	18	0	49	3 round-robin groups; 3 triangular qualifying matches; final
2025–26	Karachi Blues (10)	Sialkot	10	10	0	46	round-robin; final

=== Multiple winners ===
Karachi Blues have had the most successes, winning the Quaid-e-Azam Trophy nine times. Pakistan International Airlines (PIA) are next with seven wins, followed by Karachi, Karachi Whites, and National Bank with five each. United Bank and Sui Northern Gas Pipelines Limited (SNGPL) have four wins each; Habib Bank, Lahore and Sialkot have three; Bahawalpur, Peshawar and Railways have two outright wins; while Central Punjab and Khyber Pakhtunkhwa have two including one shared title after they tied the 2020–21 final.

== Records ==
Some team and individual records in the Quaid-e-Azam Trophy are listed in the table below:

Record	Score/figures	Player(s)/team	Season/match details
Team records
Highest innings total	951 for 7 declared	Sind	vs. Balochistan (18 February 1974)
Lowest innings total	29	Dacca University and Education Board	vs. Dacca (3 March 1965)
Batting records
Most runs (season)	1,249	Kamran Ghulam (Khyber Pakhtunkhwa)	2020–21 season
Most runs (match)	499	Hanif Mohammad (Karachi)	vs. Bahawalpur (8 January 1959)
Most runs (innings)	499	Hanif Mohammad (Karachi)	vs. Bahawalpur (8 January 1959)
Highest partnership	580 (2nd wicket)†	Rafatullah Mohmand & Aamer Sajjad (WAPDA)	vs. SSGC (3 December 2009)
Bowling records
Best figures (innings)	10 for 28	Naeem Akhtar (Rawalpindi Blues)	vs. Peshawar B (2 December 1995)
Best figures (match)	16 for 141	Saad Altaf (Rawalpindi)	vs. FATA (2 November 2017)
Wicketkeeping records
Most dismissals (match)	12 (all caught)	Kashif Mahmood (Lahore Shalimar)	vs. Abbottabad (29 October 2010)
Fielding records
Most catches (match)	8	Naved Yasin (State Bank of Pakistan)	vs. Bahawalpur Stags (18 October 2014)

† – This was a world record partnership for the second wicket in first-class cricket.

== Broadcasters ==
Territory	Years	Channels
Pakistan	2022–23	PTV Sports HD Pakistan Cricket Team on Facebook Pakistan Cricket on YouTube
Central Asia:-: Kazakhstan; Kyrgyzstan; Tajikistan; Turkmenistan; Uzbekistan	2022–23	PTV Sports HD
East Asia:-: China	2022–23	PTV Sports HD
North Asia:-: Russia	2022–23	PTV Sports HD
South Asia:-: Afghanistan; Bangladesh; Bhutan; India; Maldives; Nepal; Sri Lanka	2022–23	PTV Sports HD

== See also ==
- President's Trophy
- Pakistan Cup
- National T20 Cup
- Pakistan Super League
- Kashmir Premier League (Pakistan)
