= Commonwealth XI cricket team in Pakistan in 1967–68 =

A Commonwealth XI cricket team visited Pakistan from February to April 1968 and played eight first-class matches including three four-day matches against Pakistan. The Commonwealth XI won three matches and lost two, with the other three matches ending in draws. Pakistan won the four-day series with a victory in the opening games followed by two draws.

== Touring team ==
Captained by Richie Benaud, the Commonwealth team consisted of Roger Prideaux, Mushtaq Mohammad, Tony Lewis, Don Shepherd, Peter Walker, John Murray, David Allen, Mike Edwards, Brian Luckhurst, John Hampshire, Peter Marner, Ken Shuttleworth and Keith Boyce. Benaud was not available for the early matches and Prideaux, as vice-captain, and Lewis deputised for him.

Player	Date of birth	Batting style	Bowling style	Nationality
Richie Benaud (c)	6 October 1930	Right-hand	Right-arm legbreak	Australia
Roger Prideaux (vc)	31 July 1939	Right-hand	Right-arm medium	England
David Allen	29 October 1935	Right-hand	Right-arm offbreak	England
Keith Boyce	11 October 1943	Right-hand	Right arm fast-medium	Barbados
Mike Edwards	1 March 1940	Right-hand	Right-arm offbreak	England
John Hampshire	10 February 1941	Right-hand	Right-arm legbreak	England
Barry Knight	18 February 1938	Right-hand	Right arm fast-medium	England
Tony Lewis	6 July 1938	Right-hand	Right-arm legbreak	England
Brian Luckhurst	5 February 1939	Right-hand	Slow left-arm orthodox	England
Peter Marner	31 March 1936	Right-hand	Left-arm medium	England
Mushtaq Mohammad	22 November 1943	Right-hand	Right-arm legbreak	Pakistan
John Murray	1 April 1935	Right-hand	Wicket keeper	England
Don Shepherd	12 August 1927	Right-hand	Right-arm medium	England
Ken Shuttleworth	13 November 1944	Right-hand	Right arm fast	England
Peter Walker	17 February 1936	Right-hand	Left-arm medium	England

== Results ==
25-27 February 1968
scorecard

Commonwealth XI	v	South Zone
205/8d (103 overs); Peter Walker 49*; Zulfiqar Ali 4/48 (32 overs)		164/4d (76 overs); Wallis Mathias 42*; Ken Shuttleworth 1/22 (9 overs)
163/6d (67 overs); Mike Edwards 59; Nasim-ul-Ghani 3/44 (22 overs)		205/7 (48.3 overs); Nasim-ul-Ghani 43; David Allen 3/51 (12.3 overs)

South Zone won by 3 wickets
National Stadium, Karachi
Umpires: Idrees Baig and Umar Khan

- Commonwealth XI won the toss and decided to bat
- 3-day match

1-4 March 1968
scorecard

Pakistan	v	Commonwealth XI
366 (130.2 overs); Mohammad Ilyas 149; Peter Walker 3/22 (14.2 overs)		298 (131.1 overs); Mushtaq Mohammad 104; Intikhab Alam 4/113 (44.1 overs)
169/5d (59 overs); Intikhab Alam 39*; Don Shepherd 2/38 (14 overs)		132 (51 overs); Mike Edwards 32; Intikhab Alam 5/44 (21 overs)

Pakistan won by 105 runs
Ibn-e-Qasim Bagh Stadium, Multan
Umpires: Munawar Hussain and Saeed Ahmed

- Pakistan won the toss and decided to bat
- 4-day match

6-8 March 1968
scorecard

Central Zone	v	Commonwealth XI
120 (47.4 overs); Sherandaz Khan 41; Mushtaq Mohammad 3/26 (8 overs)		285/9d (71.3 overs); Tony Lewis 73; Javed Bhatti 4/18 (7.3 overs)
209 (99 overs); Aftab Gul 76; Richie Benaud 5/29 (18 overs)		46/1 (11.3 overs); John Murray 26*

Commonwealth XI won by 9 wickets
Sports Stadium, Sargodha
Umpires: Mohammad Gulzar Mir and Nazar Mohammad

- Central Zone won the toss and decided to bat
- 3-day match

11-13 March 1968
scorecard

Pakistan Universities	v	Commonwealth XI
267/7d (79 overs); Aftab Gul 90; Ken Shuttleworth 3/57 (15 overs)		304/2d (82 overs); John Hampshire 145; Waqar Ahmed 1/18 (5 overs)
223-9d (75 overs); Zulfiqar Ali 50*; Ken Shuttleworth 3/35 (16 overs)		187/5 (41.1 overs); Richie Benaud 59; Asif Masood 2/16 (6 overs)

Commonwealth XI won by 5 wickets
Punjab University Ground, Lahore
Umpires: Aslam Khokhar and Murawwat Hussain

- Pakistan Universities won the toss and decided to bat
- 3-day match

15-18 March 1968
scorecard

Commonwealth XI	v	Pakistan
304/7d (82.3 overs); Mike Edwards 66; Saleem Altaf 5/67 (24 overs)		381/7d (103 overs); Mohammad Ilyas 78; David Allen 3/105 (28 overs)
341/6d (116.2 overs); Richie Benaud 89; Intikhab Alam 4/83 (32.2 overs)		226/7 (45 overs); Asif Iqbal 100; David Allen 3/47 (15 overs)

Match drawn
Gaddafi Stadium, Lahore
Umpires: Mohammad Gulzar Mir and Shujauddin Butt

- Commonwealth XI won the toss and decided to bat
- 4-day match

20-22 March 1968
scorecard

Commonwealth XI	v	North Zone
208 (71.2 overs); Tony Lewis 60; Nasim-ul-Ghani 5/61 (21 overs)		188/6d (56.4 overs); Zafar Altaf 64*; Keith Boyce 2/22 (8 overs)
139/2d (41 overs); Tony Lewis 59*; Zafar Altaf 1/17 (4 overs)		107 (39.2 overs); Zafar Altaf 32; David Allen 5/37 (18 overs)

Commonwealth XI won by 52 runs
Peshawar Club Ground, Peshawar
Umpires: Nazar Mohammad and Qamaruddin Butt

- Commonwealth XI won the toss and decided to bat
- 3-day match
- Shamshad Durrani made his first-class debut

24-26 March 1968
scorecard

Commonwealth XI	v	President's XI
336 (107.1 overs); Peter Walker 112; Saeed Ahmed 5/68 (22.1 overs)		374/7d (106.4 overs); Naushad Ali 140; Ken Shuttleworth 3/75 (21 overs)
184/6 (60 overs); Brian Luckhurst 67; Javed Akhtar 3/27 (11 overs)

Match drawn
Pindi Club Ground, Rawalpindi
Umpires: Mohammad Gulzar Mir and Murawwat Hussain

- Commonwealth XI won the toss and decided to bat
- 3-day match

29 March-1 April 1968
scorecard

Commonwealth XI	v	Pakistan
301/3d (84 overs); Tony Lewis 100*; Saleem Altaf 2/65 (19 overs)		326/7d (106 overs); Mohammad Ilyas 98; Mushtaq Mohammad 2/71 (21 overs)
273/8d (92 overs); Peter Walker 75*; Intikhab Alam 6/119 (39 overs)		197/8 (70 overs); Hanif Mohammad 84; David Allen 3/60 (22 overs)

Match drawn
National Stadium, Karachi
Umpires: Daud Khan and Shujauddin Butt

- Commonwealth XI won the toss and decided to bat
- 4-day match
