= Pakistani cricket team in New Zealand in 1972–73 =

International cricket tour

The Pakistan national cricket team toured New Zealand in January and February 1973 and played a three-match Test series against the New Zealand national cricket team. Pakistan won the series 1-0, marking their first Test series victory outside Pakistan. Additionally, a Limited Overs International (LOI) took place between the second and third Tests; this match was the inaugural LOI of both teams.

== Touring team ==
- Intikhab Alam (captain)
- Asif Iqbal
- Asif Masood
- Azmat Rana
- Majid Khan
- Majid Usman
- Masood Iqbal
- Mushtaq Mohammad
- Nasim-ul-Ghani
- Pervez Sajjad
- Sadiq Mohammad
- Saleem Altaf
- Sarfraz Nawaz
- Talat Ali
- Wasim Bari
- Wasim Raja
- Zaheer Abbas

Azmat Rana and Wasim Raja had replaced Mohammad Ilyas and Saeed Ahmed after the Australian leg of the tour.

== Test series summary ==
1st Test

February 2–5, 1973
scorecard
report

Pakistan	v	New Zealand
357 (90.4 overs); Sadiq Mohammad 166; BR Taylor 4/110 (24.4 overs)		325 (74.4 overs); MG Burgess 79; Sarfraz Nawaz 4/126 (29 overs)
290/6d (71 overs); Majid Khan 79; HJ Howarth 4/99 (31 overs)		78/3 (26 overs); GM Turner 49*; Saleem Altaf 3/15 (6 overs)

Match drawn
Basin Reserve, Wellington
Umpires: Tony Mackintosh (NZ), Trevor Martin (NZ)

- Pakistan won the toss and elected to bat first
- Rain affected first two days
- Test debut of Richard Hadlee

2nd Test

February 7–10, 1973
scorecard
report

Pakistan	v	New Zealand
507/6d (123 overs); Mushtaq Mohammad 201; BR Taylor 2/91 (22 overs)		156 (51.5 overs); Ken Wadsworth 45; Intikhab Alam 7/52 (21 overs)
		185 (f/o) (49.4 overs); Vic Pollard 61; Mushtaq Mohammad 5/49 (31 overs)

Pakistan won by an innings and 166 runs
Carisbrook, Dunedin
Umpires: Dennis Copps (NZ), Dick Shortt (NZ)

- Pakistan won the toss and elected to bat first
- Mushtaq and Asif Iqbal (175) added 350 which broke the Pakistan fourth-wicket record
- Mushtaq became the second Test player to make a double century and take five wickets in an innings in the same match

3rd Test

February 16–19, 1973
scorecard
report

Pakistan	v	New Zealand
402 (117.5 overs); Majid Khan 110; BR Taylor 4/86 (32 overs)		402 (90.6 overs); BF Hastings 110; Intikhab Alam 6/127 (30 overs)
271 (78.7 overs); Mushtaq Mohammad 52; HJ Howarth 3/99 (31 overs)		92/3 (24 overs); Rodney Redmond 56; Wasim Raja 3/32 (8 overs)

Match drawn
Eden Park, Auckland
Umpires: Tony Mackintosh (NZ), Trevor Martin (NZ)

- Pakistan won the toss and elected to bat first
- Brian Hastings and Richard Collinge (68) had a world Test record 10th wicket stand of 151 in 155 minutes, since eclipsed by Joe Root and James Anderson (198) in 2014. The previous record of 130 by Wilfred Rhodes and R. E. Foster had stood for 70 years
- Rodney Redmond, replacing Terry Jarvis as opener, on debut scored a rapid 107, then a fine 56. It was to be his only Test.
- Taylor took his hundredth wicket in Tests, then moved past Dick Motz's New Zealand record

== ODI match ==
February 11, 1973
scorecard
report

New Zealand; 187 (38.3 overs)	v	Pakistan; 165 (33.3 overs)
Mark Burgess 47 (68); Sarfraz Nawaz 4/46 (7.3 overs)		Sadiq Mohammad 37 (50); Dayle Hadlee 4/34 (8 overs)

New Zealand won by 22 runs
Lancaster Park, Christchurch
Umpires: F.R. Goodall (NZ) & E.G. Wainscott (NZ)

- Pakistan won the toss and decided to field
- This was the first ever ODI match for Pakistan and New Zealand.
- Peter Coman, Glenn Turner, Bevan Congdon, Brian Hastings, Mark Burgess, Graham Vivian, Ken Wadsworth, Dayle Hadlee, Richard Hadlee, Hedley Howarth, Richard Collinge (NZ), Intikhab Alam, Sadiq Mohammad, Majid Khan, Mushtaq Mohammad, Asif Iqbal, Wasim Raja, Nasim-ul-Ghani, Wasim Bari, Saleem Altaf, Sarfraz Nawaz and Asif Masood (Pak) all made their ODI debuts.
- New Zealand registered their first ever ODI win.
