= Pakistani cricket team in Australia in 1972–73 =

International cricket tour

The Pakistan national cricket team toured Australia in the 1972–73 season and played three Test matches against the Australian national cricket team. After an inadequate preparation against weak teams, Pakistan lost by an innings in the first Test in Adelaide. While Australia won the series 3–0, the last two tests were competitive, with Pakistan seeming the likely winner on the second last days. The 2nd test in Melbourne was attended by 115,721. Pakistan also visited Sri Lanka and played a match against the Sri Lankan national cricket team and followed the tour with a series against New Zealand, where both teams played their first ODI.

== Touring team ==
- Intikhab Alam (captain)
- Asif Iqbal
- Asif Masood
- Majid Khan
- Majid Usman
- Masood Iqbal
- Mohammad Ilyas
- Mushtaq Mohammad
- Nasim-ul-Ghani
- Pervez Sajjad
- Sadiq Mohammad
- Saeed Ahmed
- Saleem Altaf
- Sarfraz Nawaz
- Talat Ali
- Wasim Bari
- Zaheer Abbas

== Test series summary ==
=== First Test ===
22–27 December 1972
(5-day match)
Scorecard

Pakistan	v	Australia
257 (75.3 overs); Wasim Bari 72; DK Lillee 4/49 (20.3 overs)		585 (110.2 overs); IM Chappell 196 (243); Mushtaq Mohammad 3/67 (11.2 overs)
214 (65.6 overs); Sadiq Mohammad 81; AA Mallett 8/59 (23.6 overs)

Australia won by an innings and 114 runs
Adelaide Oval, Adelaide
Umpires: MG O'Connell and NE Townsend

- Pakistan won the toss and elected to bat.
- 25 December was taken as a rest day.
- J Benaud (AUS) and Talat Ali (PAK) made their Test debuts.

=== Second Test ===
29 December 1972–3 January 1973
(5-day match)
Scorecard

Australia	v	Pakistan
441/5d (85.5 overs); IR Redpath 135 (204); Sarfraz Nawaz 2/100 (22.5 overs)		574/8d (124.6 overs); Majid Khan 158 (276); AA Mallett 3/124 (38 overs)
425 (87.6 overs); J Benaud 142 (207); Saleem Altaf 2/50 (14 overs)		200 (57.5 overs); Intikhab Alam 48 (126); MHN Walker 3/39 (14 overs)

Australia won by 92 runs
Melbourne Cricket Ground, Melbourne
Umpires: JR Collins and PR Enright

- Australia won the toss and elected to bat.
- 31 December was taken as a rest day.
- JR Thomson and MHN Walker (both AUS) made their Test debuts.

=== Third Test ===
6–11 January 1973
(5-day match)
Scorecard

Australia	v	Pakistan
334 (80.5 overs); IR Redpath 79 (188); Sarfraz Nawaz 4/53 (19 overs)		360 (88.6 overs); Mushtaq Mohammad 121 (276); GS Chappell 5/61 (18.6 overs)
184 (53.1 overs); RAL Massie 42 (117); Sarfraz Nawaz 4/56 (21 overs)		106 (46 overs); Zaheer Abbas 47 (120); MHN Walker 6/15 (16 overs)

Australia won by 52 runs
Sydney Cricket Ground, Sydney
Umpires: TF Brooks and JR Collins

- Pakistan won the toss and elected to field.
- 9 January was taken as a rest day.
- JR Watkins (AUS) made his Test debut.

== Sri Lanka ==
The Pakistan team had a stopover in Colombo en route to Australia and played a first-class match there between 9 and 11 November against the Sri Lankan national cricket team, which at that time did not have Test status. The match was drawn. Sri Lanka were captained by Michael Tissera and Pakistan by Intikhab Alam.

== See also ==
- Pakistani cricket team in New Zealand in 1972–73

== Annual reviews ==
- Playfair Cricket Annual 1973
- Wisden Cricketers' Almanack 1974
