= International cricket in 1950–51 =

International cricket season

The 1950–51 international cricket season was from September 1950 to April 1951.

== Season overview ==
International tours
Start date	Home team	Away team	Results [Matches]			
Start date	Home team	Away team	Test	ODI	FC	LA
4 November 1950	India	Commonwealth	—	—	0–2 [5]	—
1 December 1950	Australia	England	4–1 [5]	—	—	—
16 February 1951	Ceylon	Commonwealth	—	—	0–0 [1]	—
17 March 1951	New Zealand	England	0–1 [2]	—	—	—

== November ==
=== Commonwealth in India ===
Unofficial Test series
No.	Date	Home captain	Away captain	Venue	Result
FC 1	4–8 November	Vijay Merchant	Frank Worrell	Delhi	Match drawn
FC 2	1–5 December	Vijay Merchant	Frank Worrell	Bombay	Commonwealth XI by 10 wickets
FC 3	30 Dec–3 January	Vijay Merchant	Les Ames	Calcutta	Match drawn
FC 4	20–24 January	Vijay Merchant	Frank Worrell	Madras	Match drawn
FC 5	8–12 February	Vijay Merchant	Frank Worrell	Kanpur	Commonwealth XI by 66 runs

== December ==
=== England in Australia ===
The Ashes Test series
No.	Date	Home captain	Away captain	Venue	Result
Test 327	1–5 December	Lindsay Hassett	Freddie Brown	The Gabba, Brisbane	Australia by 70 runs
Test 328	22–27 December	Lindsay Hassett	Freddie Brown	Melbourne Cricket Ground, Melbourne	Australia by 28 runs
Test 329	5–9 January	Lindsay Hassett	Freddie Brown	Sydney Cricket Ground, Sydney	Australia by an innings and 13 runs
Test 330	2–8 February	Lindsay Hassett	Freddie Brown	Adelaide Oval, Adelaide	Australia by 274 runs
Test 331	23–28 February	Lindsay Hassett	Freddie Brown	Melbourne Cricket Ground, Melbourne	England by 8 wickets

== February ==
=== Commonwealth in Ceylon ===
First-class match series
No.	Date	Home captain	Away captain	Venue	Result
FC 1	16–18 February	Not mentioned	Frank Worrell	P Saravanamuttu Stadium, Colombo	Match drawn
FC 2	24–27 February	Vijay Hazare	Frank Worrell	P Saravanamuttu Stadium, Colombo	Commonwealth XI by 120 runs

== March ==
=== England in New Zealand ===
Test series
No.	Date	Home captain	Away captain	Venue	Result
Test 332	17–21 March	Walter Hadlee	Freddie Brown	Basin Reserve, Wellington	Match drawn
Test 333	24–28 March	Walter Hadlee	Freddie Brown	Lancaster Park, Christchurch	England by 6 wickets
