= Pakistani cricket team in England in 1971 =

International cricket tour

The Pakistan cricket team toured England in the 1971 season to play a three-match Test series against England. England won the series 1-0 with 2 matches drawn.

== Test series summary ==
=== First Test ===
3–8 June 1971
(5-day match)
Scorecard

Pakistan	v	England
608/7d (195 overs); Zaheer Abbas 274 (467); R Illingworth 3/72 (26 overs)		353 (120.5 overs); APE Knott 116 (175); Asif Masood 5/111 (34 overs)
		229/5 (f/o) (90.5 overs); BW Luckhurst 108* (279); Asif Masood 4/49 (23.5 overs)

Match drawn
Edgbaston, Birmingham
Umpires: CS Elliott and TW Spencer

- Pakistan won the toss and elected to bat.
- 6 June was taken as a rest day.
- Imran Khan (PAK) made his Test debut.

=== Second Test ===
17–22 June 1971
(5-day match)
Scorecard

England	v	Pakistan
241/2d (83 overs); G Boycott 121* (261); Pervez Sajjad 1/17 (6 overs)		148 (72.4 overs); Zaheer Abbas 40 (88); JSE Price 3/29 (11.4 overs)
117/0 (45 overs); RA Hutton 58* (149)

Match drawn
Lord's, London
Umpires: AE Fagg and AEG Rhodes

- England won the toss and elected to bat.
- 20 June was taken as a rest day.
- There was no play on the third day.
- 17 hours and 17 minutes of play lost due to the weather.
- RA Hutton (ENG) made his Test debut.

=== Third Test ===
8–13 July 1971
(5-day match)
Scorecard

England	v	Pakistan
316 (105.2 overs); G Boycott 112 (214); Asif Iqbal 3/37 (13 overs)		350 (209.4 overs); Zaheer Abbas 72 (244); BL D'Oliveira 3/46 (36 overs)
264 (107.3 overs); BL D'Oliveira 72 (158); Saleem Altaf 4/11 (14.3 overs)		205 (88.3 overs); Sadiq Mohammad 91 (220); P Lever 3/10 (3.3 overs)

England won by 25 runs
Headingley, Leeds
Umpires: DJ Constant and AE Fagg

- England won the toss and elected to bat.
- 11 July was taken as a rest day.

== External sources ==
- CricketArchive – tour itineraries

== Annual reviews ==
- Playfair Cricket Annual 1972
- Wisden Cricketers' Almanack 1972
