= Aftab Khan =

Aftab Khan may refer to:

- Aftab Ahmad Khan (1923–2011), Pakistani military leader
- Aftab Ahmad Khan Sherpao (born 1944), Pakistani political leader
- Aftab Ahmed Khan (born 1945), Indian Police Service officer
- Aftab Khan (fielding coach), Pakistani fielding coach and cricketer
- Aftab Gul Khan (born 1946), Pakistani cricketer
- Aftab mehboob khan(born 1996)

Chef Indian

== See also ==
- Khan (surname)
