= Pakistani cricket team in England in 1974 =

International cricket tour

The Pakistan cricket team toured England in the 1974 season to play a three-match Test series against England. The first Test of the series was England's 500th Test match. The series was tied 0-0 with all three matches drawn. The team completed their 22-match itinerary undefeated, the first touring team to do so in England since 1948.

== The team ==
- Intikhab Alam (captain)
- Asif Iqbal (vice-captain)
- Aftab Baloch
- Aftab Gul
- Asif Masood
- Imran Khan
- Maazullah Khan
- Majid Khan
- Mohammad Nazir
- Mushtaq Mohammad
- Naseer Malik
- Sadiq Mohammad
- Sarfraz Nawaz
- Shafiq Ahmed
- Wasim Bari
- Wasim Raja
- Zaheer Abbas

The manager was Omar Kureishi.

== Test series summary ==
=== First Test ===
25–30 July 1974
(5-day match)
Scorecard

| Pakistan | v | England |
| 285 (101.5 overs); Majid Khan 75 (201); CM Old 3/65 (21 overs) | | 183 (72 overs); D Lloyd 48 (104); Asif Masood 3/50 (16 overs) |
| 179 (68.1 overs); Mushtaq Mohammad 43 (142); GG Arnold 3/36 (23.1 overs) | | 238/6 (107 overs); JH Edrich 70 (247); Sarfraz Nawaz 4/56 (36 overs) |

Match drawn
Headingley, Leeds
Umpires: AE Fagg and TW Spencer

- Pakistan won the toss and elected to bat.
- 28 July was taken as a rest day.
- There was no play on the final day.
- Shafiq Ahmed (PAK) made his Test debut.

=== Second Test ===
8–13 August 1974
(5-day match)
Scorecard

| Pakistan | v | England |
| 130/9d (44.5 overs); Majid Khan 48 (91); DL Underwood 5/20 (14 overs) | | 270 (105 overs); APE Knott 83 (176); Asif Masood 3/47 (25 overs) |
| 226 (97.5 overs); Mushtaq Mohammad 76 (206); DL Underwood 8/51 (34.5 overs) | | 27/0 (10 overs); DL Amiss 14* (34) |

Match drawn
Lord's, London
Umpires: DJ Constant and CS Elliott

- Pakistan won the toss and elected to bat.
- 11 August was taken as a rest day.
- There was no play on the final day.

=== Third Test ===
22–27 August 1974
(5-day match)
Scorecard

| Pakistan | v | England |
| 600/7d (165.3 overs); Zaheer Abbas 240 (410); AW Greig 2/92 (25 overs) | | 545 (225.4 overs); DL Amiss 183 (372); Intikhab Alam 5/116 (51.4 overs) |
| 94/4 (30 overs); Wasim Raja 30* (60); GG Arnold 2/22 (6 overs) |

Match drawn
The Oval, London
Umpires: WE Alley and HD Bird

- Pakistan won the toss and elected to bat.
- 25 August was taken as a rest day.

== Prudential Trophy ==
=== 1st ODI ===
31 August 1974
Scorecard

| England; 244/4 (50 overs) | v | Pakistan; 246/3 (42.5 overs) |
| D Lloyd 116* (159); Majid Khan 1/15 (3 overs) | | Majid Khan 109 (93); DL Underwood 1/32 (8 overs) |

Pakistan won by 7 wickets
Trent Bridge, Nottingham
Umpires: WL Budd (ENG) and DJ Constant (ENG)
Player of the match: Majid Khan (PAK)

- England won the toss and elected to bat.
- The match was reduced before play started from 55 to 50 overs per side.
- Imran Khan and Zaheer Abbas (both PAK) made their ODI debuts.

=== 2nd ODI ===
2, 3 September 1974
Scorecard

| England; 81/9 (35 overs) | v | Pakistan; 84/2 (18 overs) |
| RW Taylor 26* (67); Asif Masood 2/9 (7 overs) | | Zaheer Abbas 57* (61); GG Arnold 1/7 (6 overs) |

Pakistan won by 8 wickets
Edgbaston, Birmingham
Umpires: HD Bird (ENG) and CS Elliott (ENG)
Player of the match: Asif Masood (PAK)

- Pakistan won the toss and elected to field.
- Reserve day used. No play first day.
- The match was reduced before play started from 55 to 35 overs per side.

== External sources ==
- CricketArchive – tour itineraries

== Annual reviews ==
- Playfair Cricket Annual 1975
- Wisden Cricketers' Almanack 1975
