= West Indian cricket team in Pakistan in 1958–59 =

International cricket tour

The West Indies cricket team toured Pakistan in February to March 1959 and played a three-match Test series against the Pakistan national cricket team. Pakistan won the Test series 2–1. West Indies were captained by Gerry Alexander and Pakistan by Fazal Mahmood.

== Test series summary ==
=== First Test ===
20–25 February 1959
(5-day match)
Scorecard

West Indies	v	Pakistan
146 (60 overs); BF Butcher 45*; Fazal Mahmood 4/35 (22 overs); Nasim-ul-Ghani 4/35 (16 overs)		304 (160.2 overs); Hanif Mohammad 103; WW Hall 3/57 (30 overs)
245 (113 overs); JS Solomon 66; Shujauddin 3/18 (13 overs)		88/0 (34 overs); Ijaz Butt 41*

Pakistan won by 10 wickets
National Stadium, Karachi
Umpires: Daud Khan and Murawwat Hussain

- Pakistan won the toss and elected to field.
- 23 February was taken as a rest day.
- Ijaz Butt and A D'Souza (both PAK) made their Test debuts.

=== Second Test ===
6–8 March 1959
(5-day match)
Scorecard

Pakistan	v	West Indies
145 (75.3 overs); W Mathias 64; WW Hall 4/28 (13 overs)		76 (36.3 overs); GS Sobers 29; Fazal Mahmood 6/34 (18.3 overs)
144 (62.5 overs); W Mathias 45; ES Atkinson 4/42 (22 overs)		172 (60.5 overs); GS Sobers 45; Fazal Mahmood 6/66 (27 overs)

Pakistan won by 41 runs
Bangabandhu National Stadium, Dhaka, Bangladesh
Umpires: Khwaja Saeed and Munawar Hussain

- West Indies won the toss and elected to field.
- The match was scheduled for five days but completed in three.

=== Third Test ===
26–31 March 1959
(5-day match)
Scorecard

West Indies	v	Pakistan
469 (149.3 overs); RB Kanhai 217; Nasim-ul-Ghani 3/106 (30 overs)		209 (79.2 overs); Ijaz Butt 47; WW Hall 5/87 (24 overs)
		104 (f/o) (48.5 overs); Saeed Ahmed 33; S Ramadhin 4/25 (10 overs)

West Indies won by an innings and 156 runs
Bagh-e-Jinnah, Lahore
Umpires: Akhtar Hussain and Munawar Hussain

- West Indies won the toss and elected to bat.
- 27 March was taken as a rest day.
- Mushtaq Mohammad (PAK), and MR Bynoe (WIN) made their Test debuts.
