= Majid Usman =

Pakistani cricketer

Personal information
- Full name: Majid Usman Ghaznavi
- Born: 31 August 1953 (age 73); Lahore, Pakistan
- Batting: Right-handed
- Bowling: Right-arm medium-fast

Domestic team information
- Years: Team
- 1969-70 to 1971-72: Lahore

Career statistics
Competition	First-class
Matches	13
Runs scored	163
Batting average	14.81
100s/50s	0/0
Top score	23
Balls bowled	1269
Wickets	29
Bowling average	20.93
5 wickets in innings	1
10 wickets in match	0
Best bowling	5/47
Catches/stumpings	4/–
- Source: Cricinfo, 25 January 2022

Majid Usman (born 31 August 1953) is a former Pakistani cricketer who played first-class cricket from 1969 to 1973. He toured with the Pakistan cricket team in the 1972–73 season but did not play Test cricket.

A medium-fast bowler, Usman made his first-class debut in September 1969 in the Quaid-e-Azam Trophy. Two matches later, he took 5 for 47 in the second innings of Lahore A’s victory over Peshawar in the Ayub Trophy. He opened the bowling with Imran Khan for Lahore Under-19s when they won the national Under-19 championship in 1970–71.

Usman was selected as one of the 17 men that made up the Pakistan team that toured Australia and New Zealand from November 1972 to March 1973. He played only three first-class matches on the tour, all in New Zealand against Plunket Shield teams, taking seven wickets. That was the end of his first-class career, at the age of 19.
