= Maazullah Khan =

Personal information
- Born: 1 September 1947 (age 79); Peshawar, Pakistan
- Batting: Right-handed
- Bowling: Right-arm off-spin

Domestic team information
- Years: Team
- 1965-66 to 1984-85: Peshawar
- 1971-72: Railways B
- 1972-73 to 1977-78: North-West Frontier Province
- 1973-74 to 1975-76: Punjab

Career statistics
Competition	FC	LA
Matches	45	5
Runs scored	1,288	59
Batting average	19.51	19.66
100s/50s	2/2	0/0
Top score	130	35
Balls bowled	7,700	186
Wickets	112	5
Bowling average	25.06	47.40
5 wickets in innings	3	0
10 wickets in match	1	0
Best bowling	8/97	2/49
Catches/stumpings	24/–	1/–
- Source: Cricket Archive, 31 December 2023

Maazullah Khan (born 1 September 1947) is a Pakistani former cricketer and cricket administrator who played first-class cricket in Pakistan from 1966 to 1984. He toured England in 1974 with the Pakistan team but did not play Test cricket.

== Playing career ==
An off-spin bowler and useful lower-order batsman, Maazullah was the leading player for the weak Peshawar and North-West Frontier Province teams from the late 1960s to the mid-1970s. He captained Peshawar from 1970–71 to 1977–78. In his first match as captain he took 4 for 18 and 6 for 42 to give Peshawar a rare innings victory over Pakistan Air Force.

In 1973–74 he scored his first century (which was also his first fifty), a score of 130 for Peshawar against Lahore B. Later in the season, playing for North-West Frontier Province Governor's XI against the Sri Lankan touring team, he took 8 for 97.

Maazullah was selected in the 17-man Pakistan Test side that toured England in 1974, probably more in order to give North-West Frontier Province a representative than for his Test potential. He played only four of the 17 first-class matches and took one wicket from 68 overs, along with three catches and one run.

He scored a second century (119) in 1977–78, for Peshawar against Combined Services. He left first-class cricket after the 1977–78 season, but returned for three matches for Peshawar between October 1983 and October 1984. His last match was also the last first-class match for Majid Khan.

== Administrative career ==
According to Peter Oborne, as captain and later as administrator Maazullah Khan encouraged two generations of Khyber Pakhtunkhwa cricketers. One of his protégés was the left-arm spinner Farrukh Zaman.

He served as Khyber Pakhtunkhwa Province director of sports, and refereed first-class and List A matches in Peshawar in the mid-1990s.

The Maazullah Khan Cricket Academy, named in his honour, is part of the Peshawar Sports Complex, which includes Arbab Niaz Stadium.
