= Aaron Redmond =

New Zealand cricketer

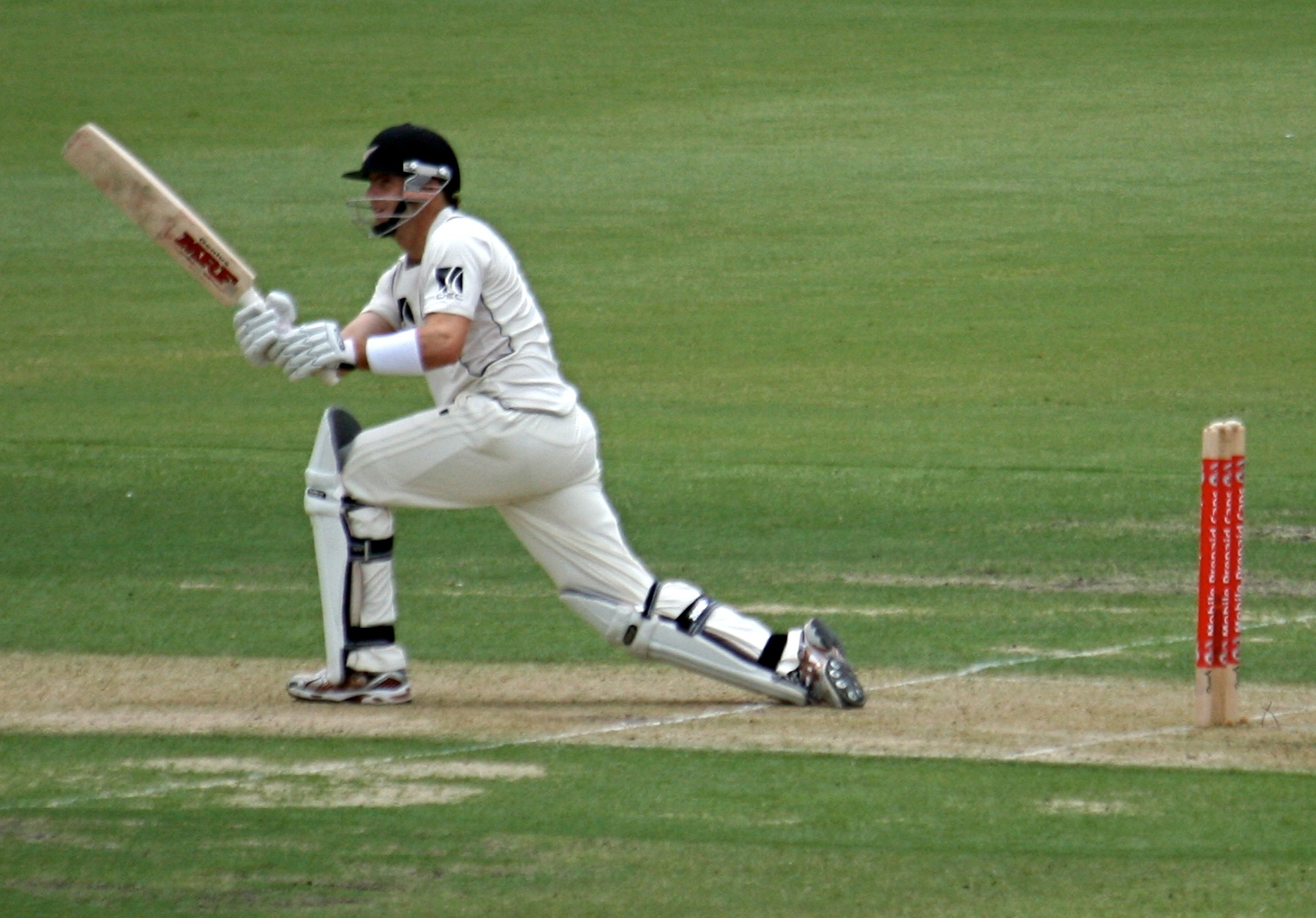
- Redmond batting for New Zealand against Australia in 2008

Personal information
- Full name: Aaron Joseph Redmond
- Born: 23 September 1979 (age 47); Auckland, New Zealand
- Nickname: Redders
- Batting: Right-handed
- Bowling: Right-arm leg spin
- Role: Batsman
- Relatives: Rodney Redmond (father)

International information
- National side: New Zealand (2008–2013)
- Test debut (cap 239): 15 May 2008 v England
- Last Test: 3 December 2013 v West Indies
- ODI debut (cap 157): 3 October 2009 v Australia
- Last ODI: 14 October 2010 v Bangladesh
- ODI shirt no.: 40
- T20I debut (cap 40): 11 June 2009 v Ireland
- Last T20I: 23 May 2010 v Sri Lanka
- T20I shirt no.: 40

Domestic team information
- Years: Team
- 1999/00–2003/04: Canterbury
- 2004/05–2014/15: Otago
- 2010: Gloucestershire

Career statistics
Competition	Test	ODI	FC	LA
Matches	8	6	129	125
Runs scored	325	152	7,247	2,941
Batting average	21.66	25.33	34.18	26.73
100s/50s	0/2	0/1	15/41	3/18
Top score	83	52	154	134*
Balls bowled	105	–	8,443	1,094
Wickets	3	–	107	23
Bowling average	26.66	–	42.76	41.00
5 wickets in innings	0	–	0	0
10 wickets in match	0	–	0	0
Best bowling	2/47	–	4/30	3/40
Catches/stumpings	5/–	3/–	89/–	45/–
- Source: Cricinfo, 12 April 2022

Aaron James Redmond (born 23 September 1979) is a former New Zealand international cricketer. He was a member of the Otago cricket team for ten seasons, having previously played for Canterbury. Redmond played as a right-handed batsman. He made eight Test match, six One Day International and seven Twenty20 International appearances for the New Zealand national cricket team between 2008 and 2013.

== Early life and family ==
Redmond was born at Auckland in 1979 and brought up in Australia where he attended Kent Street Senior High School in Perth. He played cricket for Western Australia under-19s whilst at school. His father, Rodney Redmond, played international cricket for New Zealand in the 1970s and was a New Zealand Cricket Almanack player of the year in 1973.

Redmond met his wife whilst playing club cricket for Wigan Cricket Club in England. After his retirement, the family moved back to England full-time, with Redmond working as an accountant as well as coaching and playing for Wigan.

== Domestic career ==
Redmond originally joined Canterbury as a leg spinner in 1999, but converted to become a top-order batsman after moving to Otago ahead of the 2004–05 season. He played 55 senior matches for Canterbury and over 200 for Otago, scoring centuries for the side in first-class, List A and Twenty20 cricket. Described as "solid rather than spectacular", he scored over 7,000 first-class runs, including 15 centuries. He retired as the sixth highest run scorer for Otago in first-class cricket, with 4,795 runs at an average of 39.30 runs per innings. he scored 11 centuries for the province, including

== International career ==
After a successful domestic career, he was called up to the full international squad for the tour of England in 2008, where he made his mark with a career best score of 146 against the England Lions, beating his previous best of 135. He made his Test debut on 15 May 2008 at Lord's, but was out for a duck off the bowling of James Anderson. Overall the three-match Test series against England was a disappointment for Redmond, making a total of just 54 runs at an average of 9.00.

Redmond was dropped for the two-Test series against West Indies in December 2008. The move came after New Zealand lost a two-Test series to Australia 2–0, in which Redmond scored 115 runs at an average of 28.75. Former New Zealand cricket captain, Martin Crowe stated that he did not believe that Redmond was good enough to play Test cricket, but conceded that his first year in Test cricket―in which he averaged 23.00 in seven matches―had been a difficult one. In December 2013 he was recalled into the Test side in the home series against the West Indies, playing in the first Test at Dunedin.

As well as his eight Test match appearances, Redmond played One Day International and Twenty20 International cricket, making 13 one-day appearances for New Zealand, all during 2009 and 2010. He retired from cricket at the end of the 2014–15 season.
