= New Zealand cricket team in Australia in 2008–09 =

	New Zealand	Australia
- Dates: 13 November 2008 – 15 February 2009
Captains	Daniel Vettori	Ricky Ponting

Test series
- Result: Australia won the 2-match series 2–0
Most runs	Ross Taylor (160)	Michael Clarke (217)
Most wickets	Iain O'Brien (7)	Mitchell Johnson (14)
- Player of the series: Michael Clarke (Australia)

One Day International series
- Results: 5-match series drawn 2–2
Most runs	Grant Elliott (210)	Brad Haddin (283)
Most wickets	Iain O'Brien (10)	Nathan Bracken (9)
- Player of the series: Michael Hussey (Australia)

Twenty20 International series
- Results: Australia won the 1-match series 1–0
Most runs	Brendon McCullum (61)	David Hussey (41)
Most wickets	Iain O'Brien (2)	Peter Siddle (2)
- Player of the series: Nathan Bracken (Australia)

The New Zealand cricket team toured Australia between 13 November 2008 and 15 February 2009. The tour was divided into two legs; commencing with a tour match against New South Wales, the first leg contained two Test matches between New Zealand and Australia in which the sides competed for the Trans-Tasman Trophy.

New Zealand then went home for a series against the West Indies and Australia hosted the South African team. New Zealand returned to Australia on 29 January 2009 for the second leg, comprising a tour match against the Prime Minister's XI, five One Day Internationals (ODIs) against Australia for the Chappell–Hadlee Trophy and a Twenty20 International also against Australia.

== Background ==
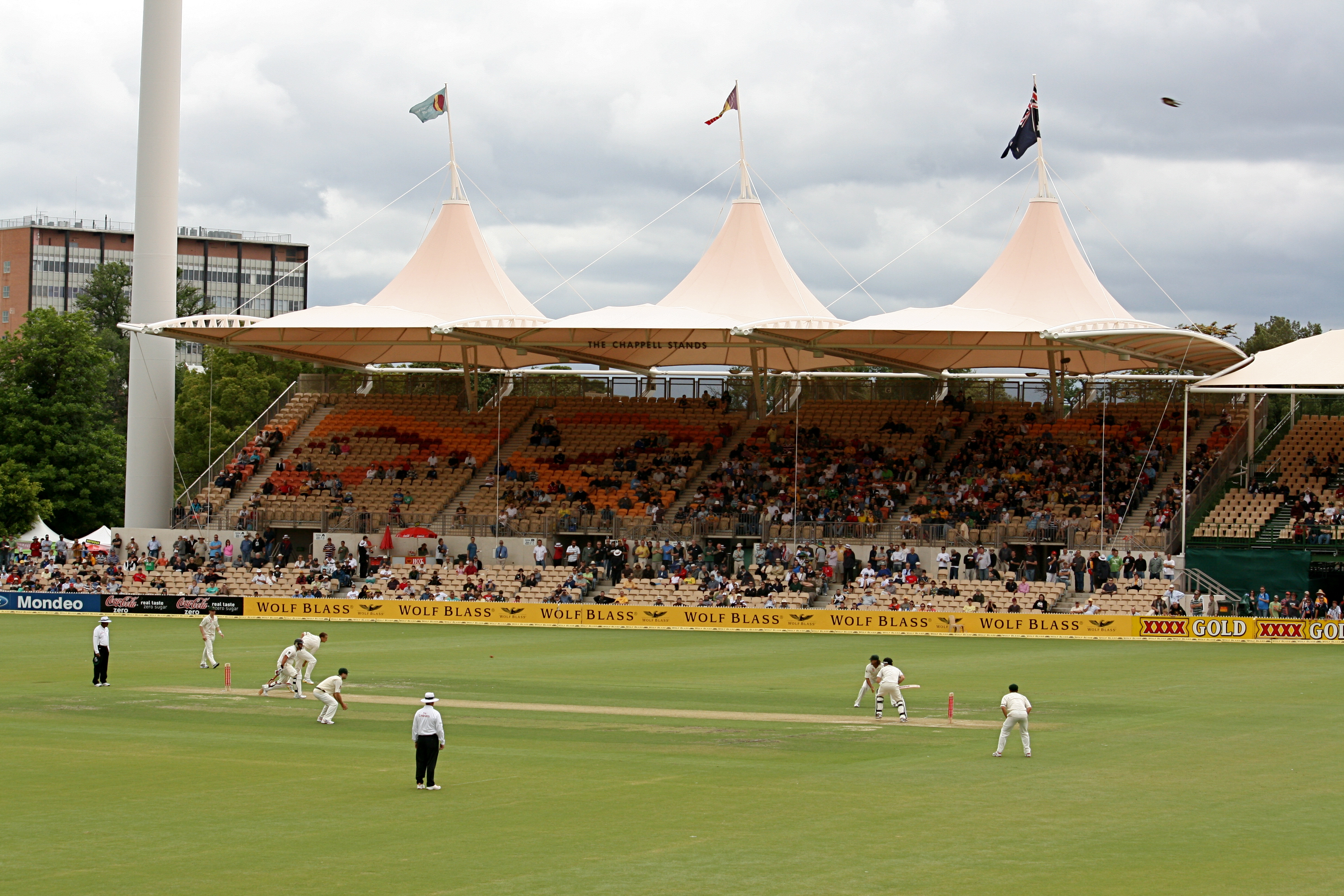
The teams playing in the 2nd Test at Adelaide Oval

The Australian side had recently returned from a tour of India where they had lost the four-match Test series, and with it the Border–Gavaskar Trophy, 2–0. During that series, Australia had repeatedly fallen behind the required over rate; during the final match, captain Ricky Ponting used part-time bowlers to try to catch up rather than push for a victory, a move which was criticised by former captains.

Prior to this series, the New Zealand side had just completed a tour of Bangladesh, winning the test series 1–0 (with one test drawn after three days were lost to rain) and the one-day series 2–1. At the beginning of the test series, they were ranked seventh in the ICC Test Championship. Captain Daniel Vettori said that he "was leading the nucleus of a good side", but pointed out that the inexperienced batting lineup would face a tough task against an Australian side that would be looking to come back strongly from their series loss to India.

== Squads ==
Test squads
Australia	New Zealand
Ricky Ponting (c)	Daniel Vettori (c)
Michael Clarke	Aaron Redmond
Stuart Clark	Jamie How
Brad Haddin (wk)	Jesse Ryder
Matthew Hayden	Ross Taylor
Michael Hussey	Peter Fulton
Mitchell Johnson	Daniel Flynn
Simon Katich	Brendon McCullum (wk)
Jason Krejza	Grant Elliott
Brett Lee	Gareth Hopkins
Peter Siddle	Tim Southee
Andrew Symonds	Iain O'Brien
Shane Watson	Kyle Mills
	Mark Gillespie
	Chris Martin

== First leg ==
=== Tour match ===
13 November – 16 November
Scorecard

New Zealanders (New Zealand)	v	New South Wales
266 (85.3 overs); Jamie How 170 (272); Grant Lambert 5/74 (16.3 overs)		361 (115.1 overs); Dominic Thornely 85 (153); Daniel Vettori 4/71 (29.1 overs)
256 (86.1 overs); Daniel Vettori 73 (139); Moisés Henriques 5/51 (19 overs)		162/4 (52.2 overs); Daniel Smith 42 (51); Chris Martin 3/16 (11 overs)

NSW won by 6 wickets
Sydney Cricket Ground, Sydney, Australia
Umpires: Gerard Abood and Paul Reiffel

== Trans–Tasman Trophy ==
=== 1st Test ===
20 November – 23 November
Scorecard

Australia	v	New Zealand
214 (77 overs); Michael Clarke 98 (217); Tim Southee 4/63 (18 overs)		156 (50 overs); Ross Taylor 40 (51); Mitchell Johnson 4/30 (8 overs)
268 (81.2 overs); Simon Katich 131* (245); Chris Martin 3/69 (21 overs)		177 (54.3 overs); Ross Taylor 75 (128); Mitchell Johnson 5/39 (17.3 overs)

Australia won by 149 runs
The Gabba, Brisbane, Australia
Umpires: Billy Doctrove and Rudi Koertzen
Player of the match: Mitchell Johnson

- This match Brett Lee took his 300th wicket.

Brisbane had been hit hard with weeks worth of devastating storms, leaving the pitch soft and green. Both teams were returning from the sub-continent and struggled badly with the bat. Australia were all out for just 214 late on day one with Clarke last to go on 98 runs, NZ survived a few overs to finish 0/7 at stumps. The next morning began perfectly for Australia with a wicket on the first ball, and more kept coming. NZ collapsing to be all out for just 156 from 50 overs, Taylor the highest scorer on 40. Australia did not fare much better with Hayden out first ball and Australia limping to 6/131 at stumps on day 2. Katich managed to score 100 and he ended running out of partners finishing not out on 131, seeing Australia to 268. Needing 327 runs to win, NZ got a terrible start and were 4–49 until a good partnership between Flynn and Taylor. However Australia managed two late wickets, one on the last ball of the day putting NZ at 6/143 at stumps on Day 3. Australia bowled NZ out for 177 on Day 4 to give them the 1–0 advantage.

=== 2nd Test ===
28 November – 1 December
Scorecard

New Zealand	v	Australia
270 (98.3 overs); Aaron Redmond 83 (125); Brett Lee 4/66 (25.3 overs)		535 (157.4 overs); Brad Haddin 169 (222); Michael Clarke 110 (239); Iain O'Brien 3/111 (32 overs)
203 (74.1 overs); Brendon McCullum 84* (134); Brett Lee 5/105 (25 overs)

Australia won by an innings and 62 runs
Adelaide Oval, Adelaide, Australia
Umpires: Billy Doctrove and Rudi Koertzen
Player of the match: Brad Haddin

- New Zealand won the toss and elected to bat.
- Matthew Hayden (Aus) played in his 100th Test.

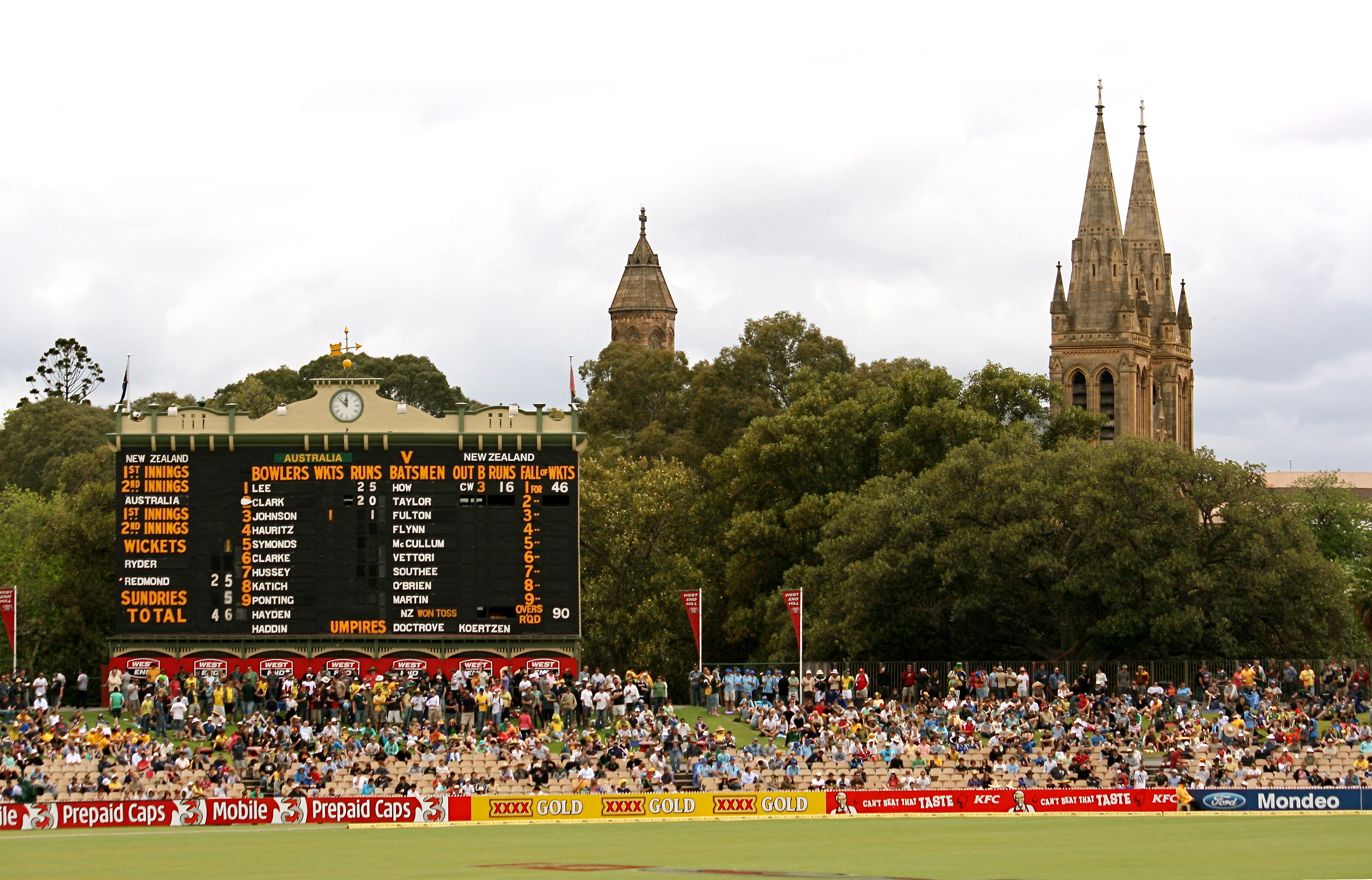
The scoreboard near the start of Day 1 of the second Test.

Following the first Test, the Australians called Peter Siddle into the squad with Shane Watson returning to state cricket. Jason Krejza was named in the team after having been twelfth man in the first Test; however, he twisted his ankle in training two days prior to the start of the match and his place was taken by fellow spin bowler Nathan Hauritz.

On the Tuesday before the match began, New Zealand Cricket announced the appointment of Andy Moles as successor of retiring coach John Bracewell. Moles was to take over immediately following the Australian Test series, meaning this was Bracewell's final match in charge of the New Zealand side. The only change to the New Zealand team was Peter Fulton replacing Grant Elliott in an attempt to bolster the batting lineup.

== Second leg ==
=== Tour match ===
29 January 2009
Scorecard

New Zealand; 271/5 (50 overs)	v	Prime Minister's XI (Australia); 272/4 (47.5 overs)
Brendon McCullum 114 (130 balls); Clinton McKay 3/52 (10 overs)		George Bailey 107* (138 balls); Jeetan Patel 2/51 (10 overs)

Prime Minister's XI (Australia) won by 6 wickets
Manuka Oval, Canberra, Australia
Umpires: IG Lock and Y Ramasundara
Player of the match: George Bailey

== ODI Series ==
=== 1st ODI ===
1 February 2009
13:30 (D/N)
Scorecard

Australia; 181 (48.4 overs)	v	New Zealand; 182/8 (50 overs)
Michael Hussey 49 (65 balls); Kyle Mills 4/35 (9.4 overs)		Ross Taylor 64 (97 balls); Nathan Bracken 3/35 (10 overs)

New Zealand won by 2 wickets
WACA, Perth, Australia Att: 14,571
Umpires: Steve Bucknor and Bruce Oxenford
Player of the match: Kyle Mills

Australia's top order capitulated with none of the top five scoring over 15 runs. There was some resistance from Hussey and Haddin, but ultimately Australia were unable to bat out the innings, running out of wickets and posting a very low score. Australia did however put the pressure on with the ball and for most of the chase New Zealand was behind Australia score at the same points in time. Michael Clarke clean-bowled a batsman but replays showed that the bails were dislodged by Haddin's gloves, which were in front of the stumps. The loss was Australia's fourth consecutive ODI loss, having just been defeated 1–4 against South Africa.

=== 2nd ODI ===
6 February 2009
14:15 (D/N)
Scorecard

Australia; 225/5 (50 overs)	v	New Zealand; 226/4 (48.5 overs)
Michael Clarke 98 (133 balls); Iain O'Brien 2/48 (10 overs)		Grant Elliott 61* (75 balls); James Hopes 2/30 (10 overs)

New Zealand won by 6 wickets
Melbourne Cricket Ground, Melbourne, Australia Attendance: 28,267
Umpires: Steve Bucknor & Paul Reiffel
Player of the match: Michael Clarke

=== 3rd ODI ===
8 February 2009
14:15 (D/N)
Scorecard

Australia; 301/9 (50 overs)	v	New Zealand; 269 (47.3 overs)
Brad Haddin 109 (114 balls); Iain O'Brien 3/68 (10 overs)		Grant Elliott 115 (124 balls); Cameron White 2/10 (2 overs)

Australia won by 32 runs
Sydney Cricket Ground, Sydney, Australia
Umpires: Steve Bucknor (West Indies) and Simon Taufel (Australia)
Player of the match: Brad Haddin

Australia could have scored 303, but 2 penalty runs were not awarded because the Australian batsmen ran down the pitch (as opposed to beside the pitch, which is the rule) again after being warned not to by the umpire. The rule no runs are obtained from a delivery (ball) if a batsman runs down the pitch.

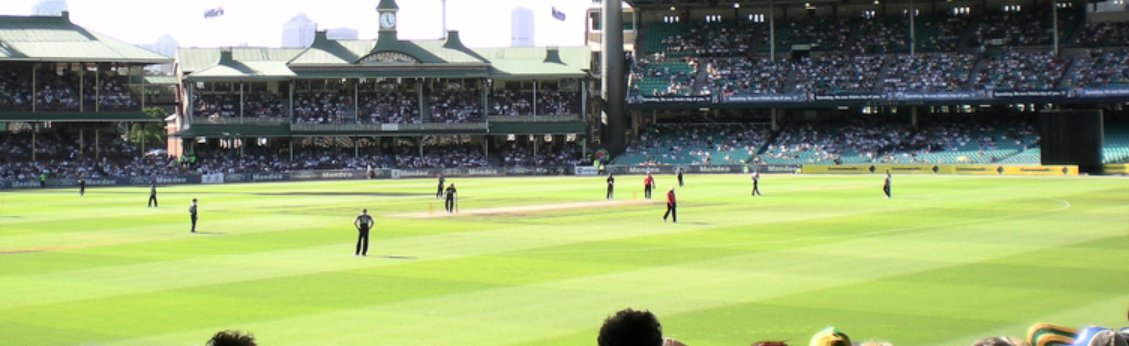
NZ v Australia, 3rd ODI Chappell-Hadlee Trophy 2009

=== 4th ODI ===
10 February 2009
13:45 (D/N)
Scorecard

New Zealand; 244/8 (50 overs)	v	Australia; 247/4 (48.2 overs)
Ross Taylor 76 (71); Mitchell Johnson 3/51 (10 overs)		David Hussey 79 (96); Iain O'Brien 2/54 (10 overs)

Australia won by 6 wickets
Adelaide Oval, Adelaide, Australia
Umpires: Steve Bucknor (WI) & Steve Davis (AUS)
Player of the match: David Hussey

=== 5th ODI ===
13 February 2009
13:15 (D/N)
Scorecard

Australia; 168/4 (22 overs)	v	New Zealand; 123/6 (14 overs)
Brad Haddin 88* (65); Kyle Mills 2/22 (4 overs)		Martin Guptill 63* (34); Nathan Bracken 2/33 (3 overs)

No result
Brisbane Cricket Ground, Woolloongabba, Brisbane, Australia
Umpires: Steve Bucknor (WI) & Rod Tucker (AUS)

Rain caused the match to be reduced to 22 overs. The New Zealand innings was further reduced to 20 overs. Heavy rain caused the match to be abandoned when New Zealand were 123.

== Only T20I ==
15 February 2009
Scorecard

Australia; 150/7	v	New Zealand; 149/5
David Hussey 41 (39 balls); Iain O'Brien 2/34 (4 overs)		Brendon McCullum 61 (47 balls); Peter Siddle 2/24 (4 overs)

Australia won by 1 run
Sydney Cricket Ground, Sydney, Australia
Umpires: B N J Oxenford, P R Reiffel
Player of the match: Nathan Bracken

== Gallery ==
Photos from the tour

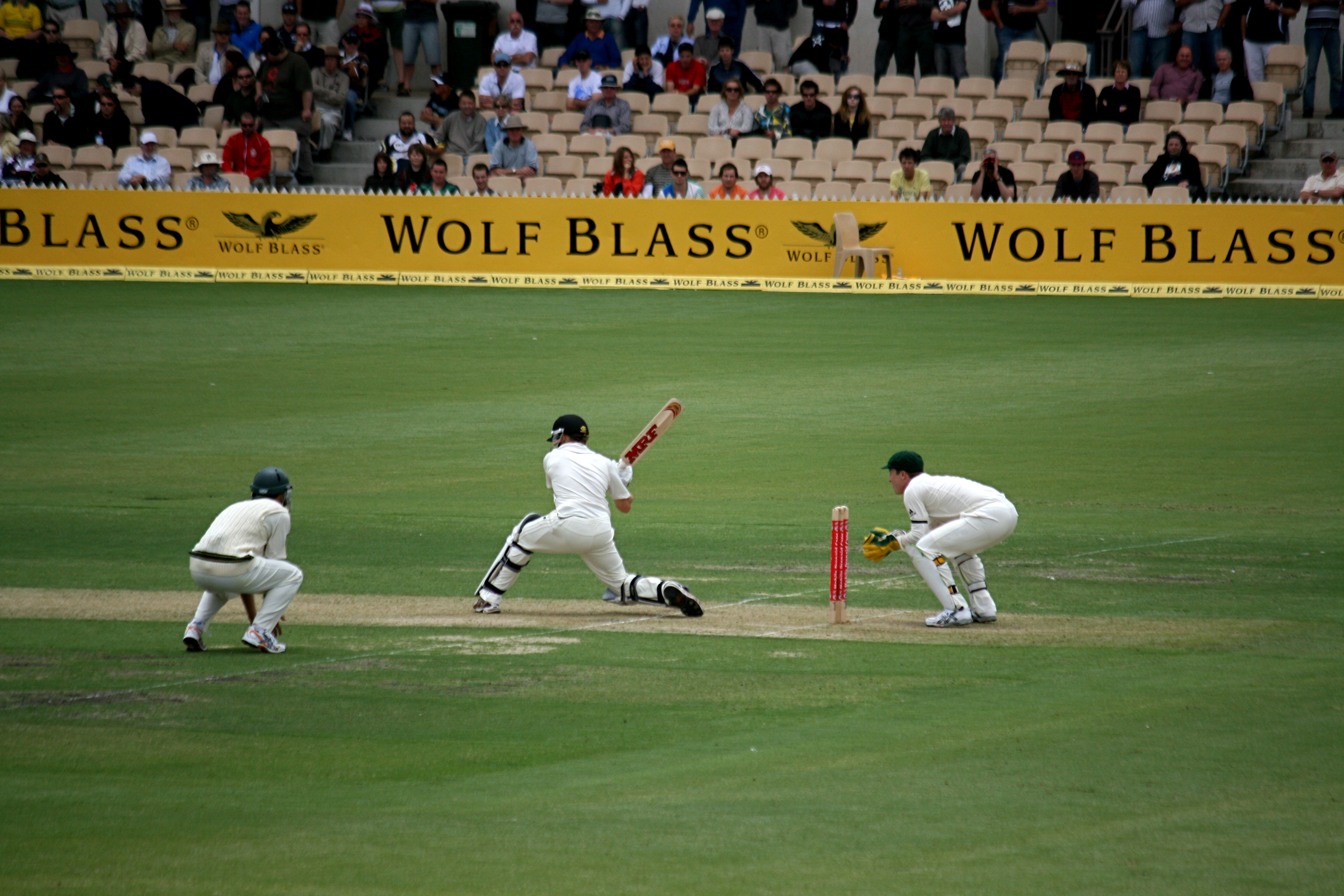
Aaron Redmond hitting a six off Nathan Hauritz in the second Test (photo 1 of 3).

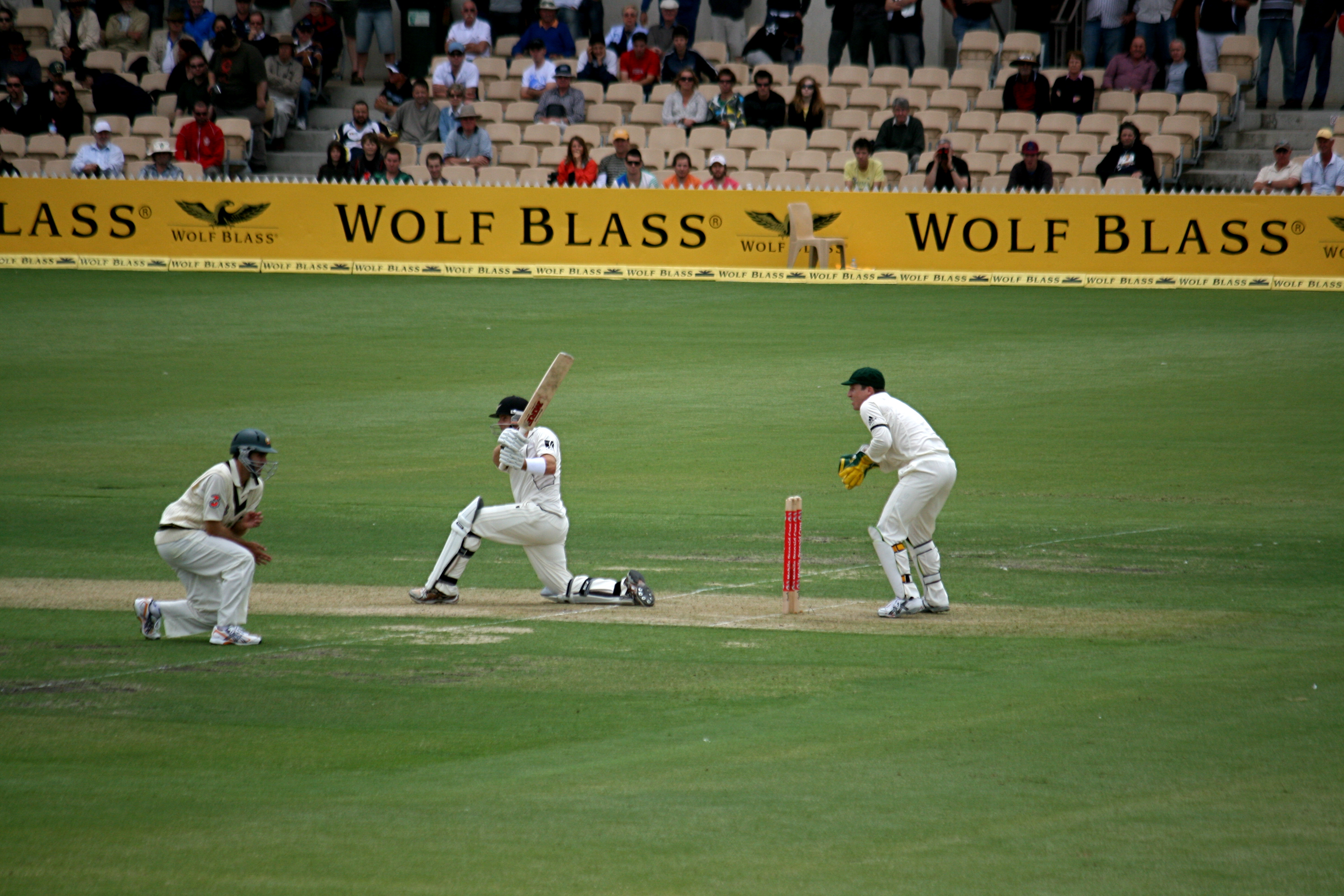
Aaron Redmond hitting a six off Nathan Hauritz in the second Test (photo 2 of 3).

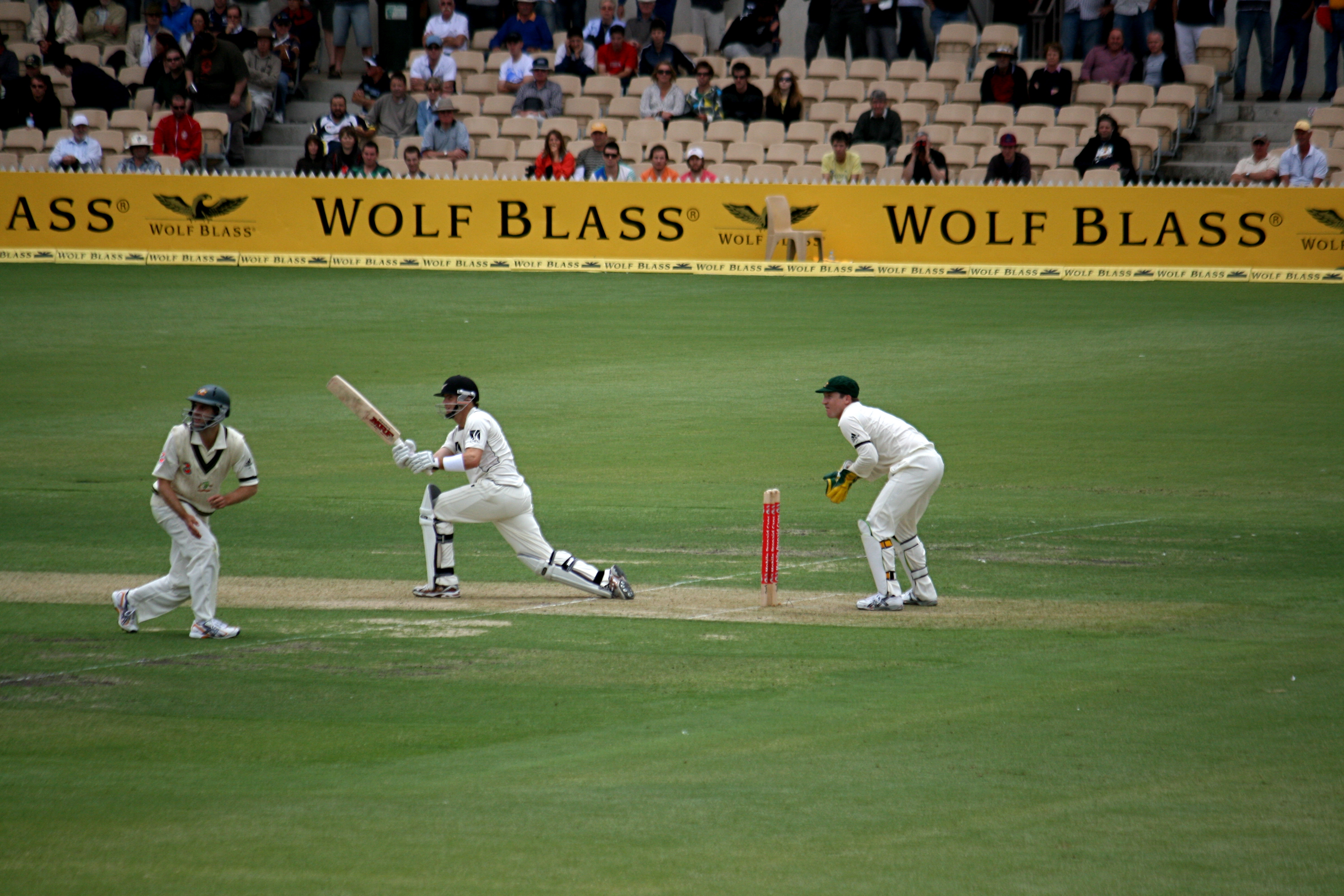
Aaron Redmond hitting a six off Nathan Hauritz in the second Test (photo 3 of 3).

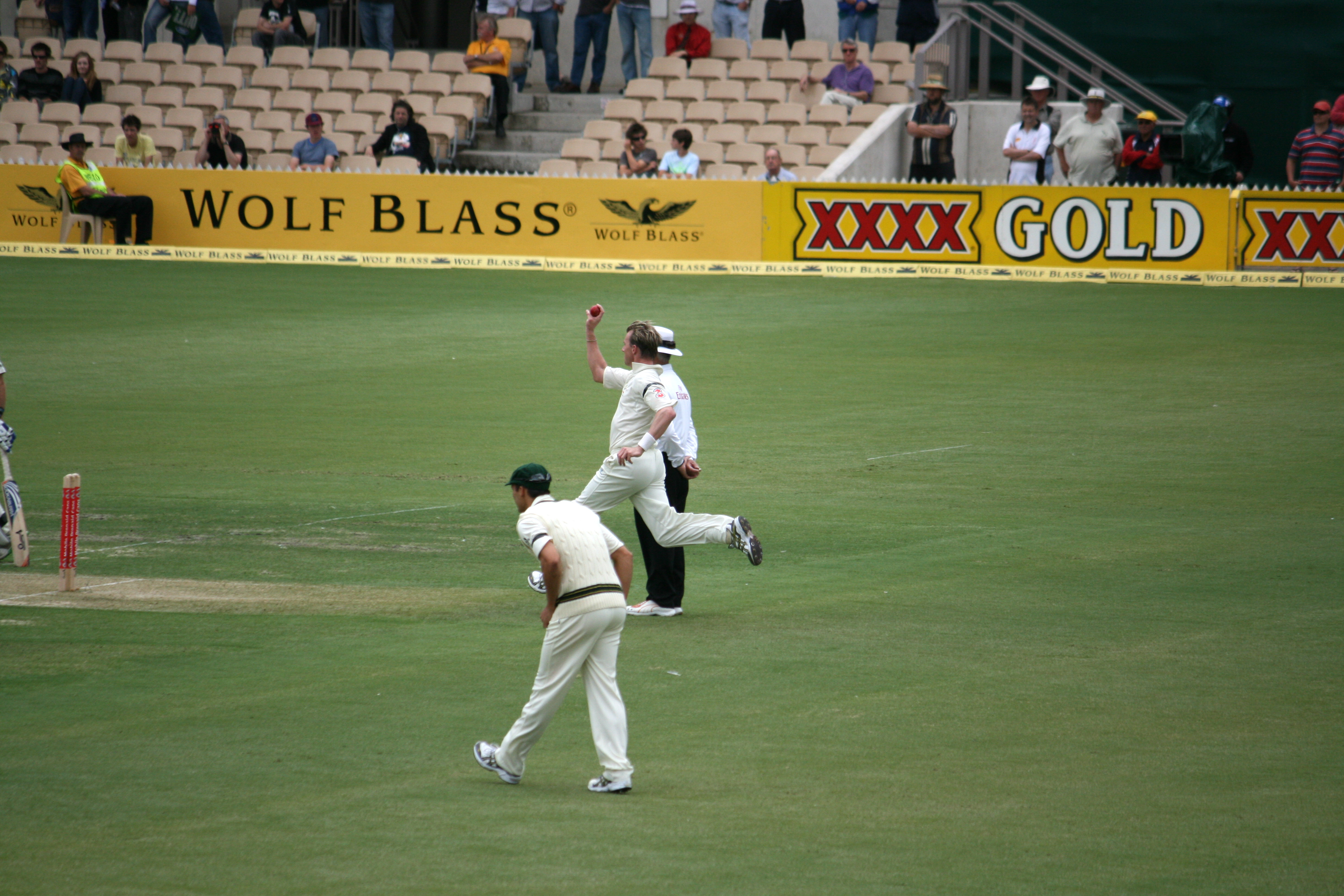
Brett Lee bowling (photo 1 of 5).

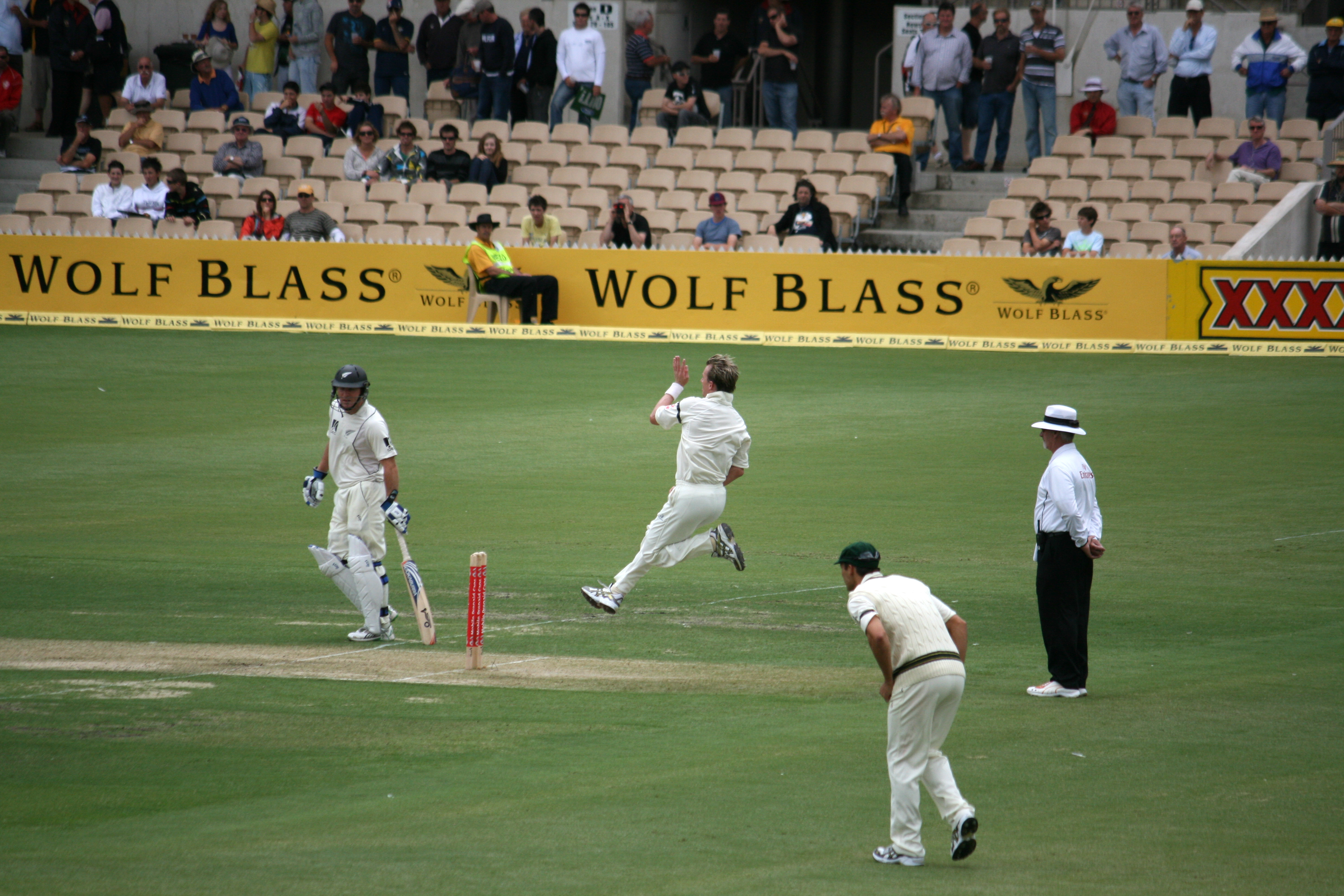
Brett Lee bowling (photo 2 of 5).

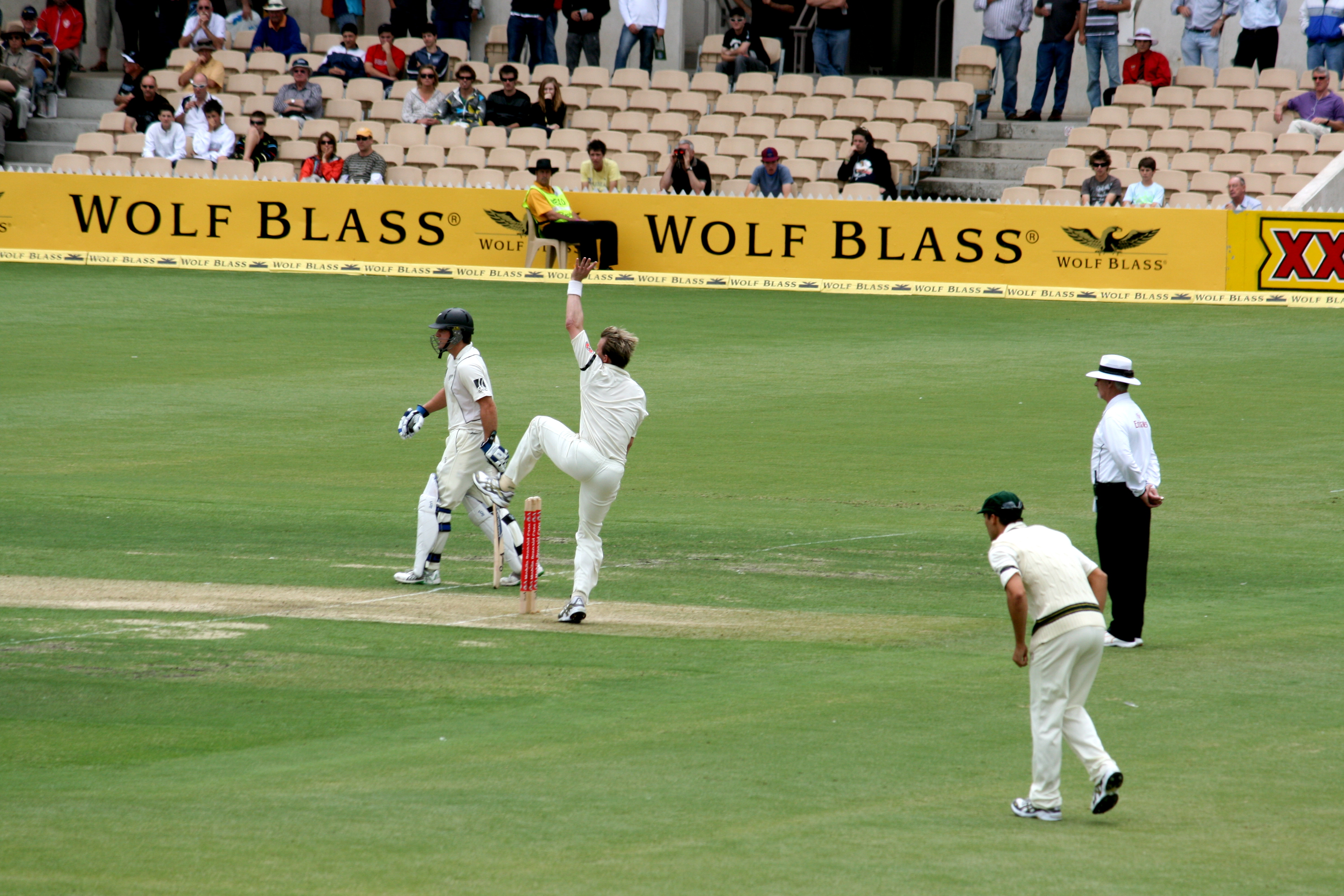
Brett Lee bowling (photo 3 of 5).

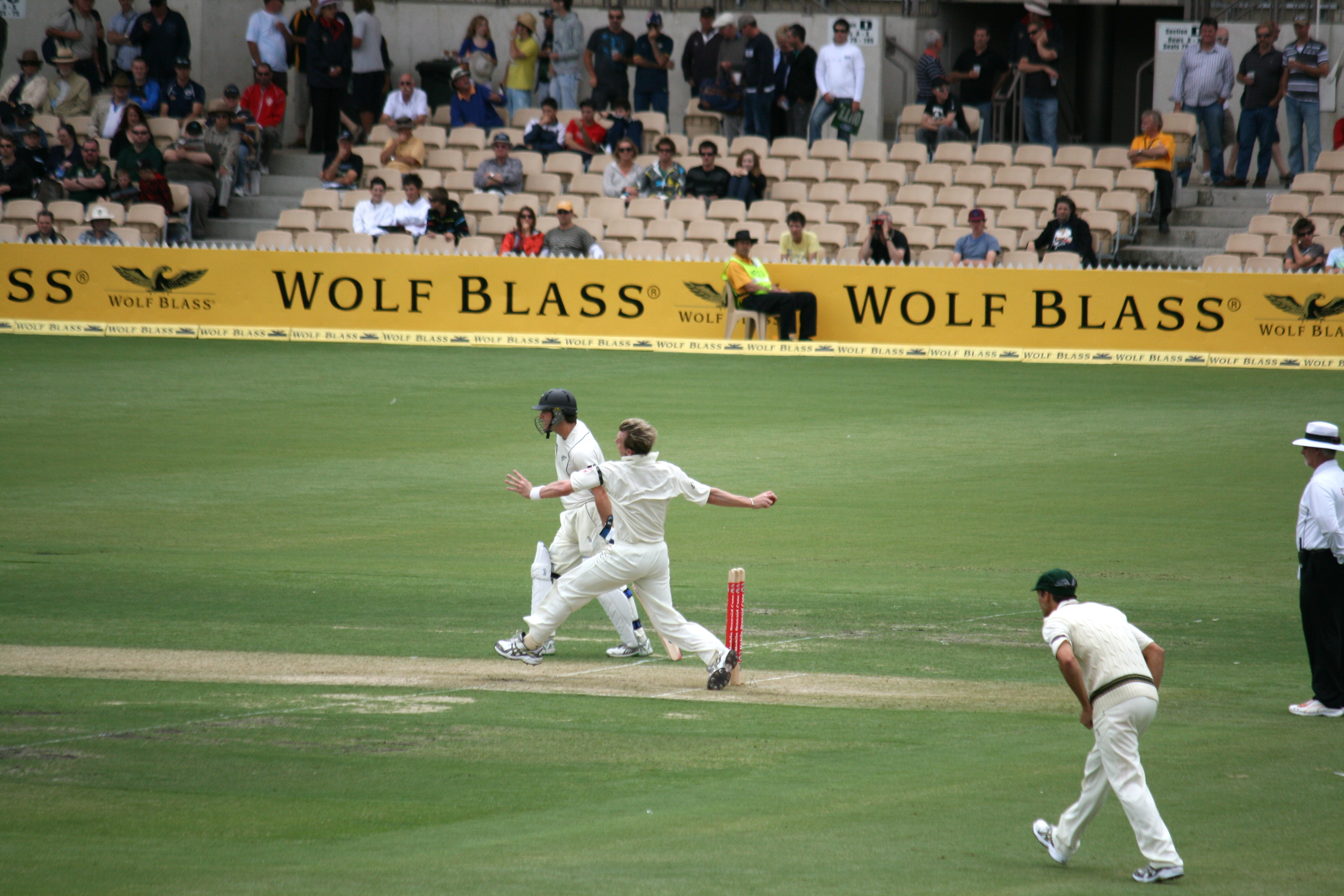
Brett Lee bowling (photo 4 of 5).

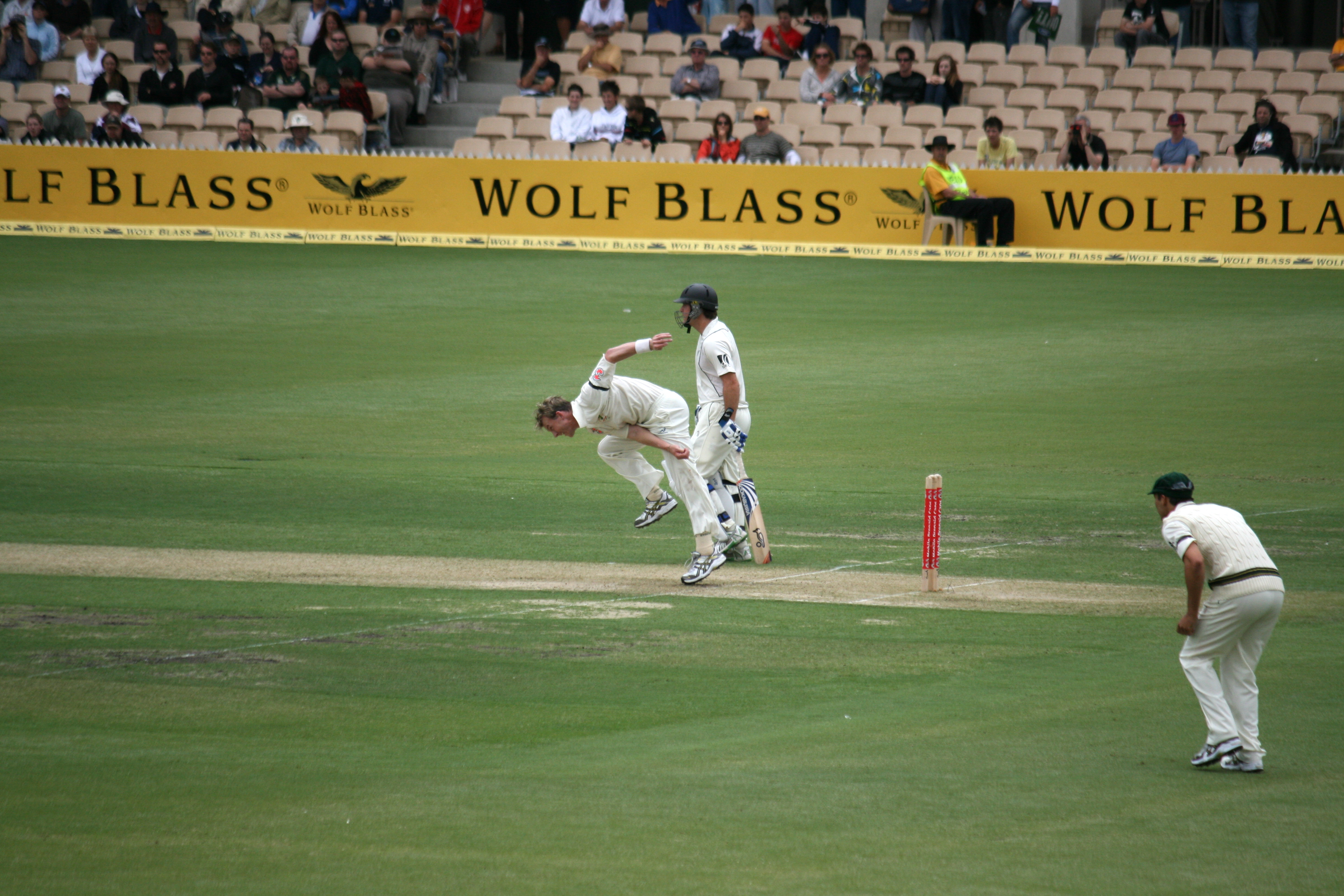
Brett Lee bowling (photo 5 of 5).
