= Mike Edwards (cricketer) =

Personal information
- Full name: Michael John Edwards
- Born: 1 March 1940 (age 86); Balham, London, England
- Batting: Right-handed
- Bowling: Right-arm off-break
- Role: Batsman

Domestic team information
- Years: Team
- 1960–1962: Cambridge University
- 1961–1974: Surrey
- FC debut: 11 June 1960 Cambridge University v Free Foresters
- Last FC: 13 August 1974 Surrey v Warwickshire

Career statistics
Competition	First-class	List A
Matches	256	93
Runs scored	11,378	1.549
Batting average	26.70	19.12
100s/50s	12/57	1/7
Top score	137	108*
Balls bowled	264	–
Wickets	2	–
Bowling average	89.50	–
5 wickets in innings	0	–
10 wickets in match	0	–
Best bowling	2/53	–
Catches/stumpings	274/–	27/–
- Source: CricketArchive, 18 May 2008

Michael John Edwards (born 1 March 1940) is a former English cricketer who played for Cambridge University from 1960 to 1962 and for Surrey from 1961 to 1974. He was a batsman who had only limited success until he became an opener in 1966. He was also a fine short-leg fielder.

== Early struggles ==
After attending Alleyn's School, he went to Cambridge University. He played only eight times for the university team in three years (once in 1960, four times in 1961 and thrice in 1962), having little success and failing to get his Blue.

He played twice for Surrey in 1961 while still at Cambridge, his first match being against Warwickshire at the end of July. He did not appear for Surrey in 1962, and then played on three more occasions in 1963. It was not until 1964 that he began to appear regularly. In that year he played in 18 games, scoring 669 runs at an average of 22.30. The following season, 15 games brought him 401 runs at 19.09.

== Successful years ==
Until now he had been batting in the middle of the order, but at the end of June 1966 he was given the chance to open the batting, with Mickey Stewart dropping down the order. This transformed his fortunes, and he struck up a productive opening partnership with John Edrich. The pair would go on to have 17 century partnerships for the first wicket. Edwards made his first century that season, and reached 1,000 runs, the first of five occasions on which he did so. In 21 matches he made 1,064 runs at 30.40. He also held 41 catches, almost two catches per match. During the season he was awarded his county cap.

The following year he scored 1,413 runs in 31 matches, with two more hundreds. He also held 53 catches. Excluding wicket-keepers, this is the ninth highest number of catches ever held in a season for Surrey. In 1967-68 he toured Pakistan with a Commonwealth XI. He managed five fifties in 13 innings, without scoring a century.

In 1968 his average declined to 24.27, well down on the previous two English seasons. However he still managed 1,408 runs in 32 matches, with one hundred. He held 39 catches.

1969 was his best season with the bat. He scored 1,428 runs at 36.61 in 25 matches, including four centuries. He took 25 catches. He toured the West Indies with the Duke of Norfolk's XI in 1969–70, but in three first-class fixtures he scored only 67 runs.

The next English season brought him 1,281 runs in 22 matches at 32.84, with one century. He held 29 catches.

== Decline ==
In 1971 he was a member of the Surrey side that won the County Championship for the first time since 1958. However he did not have one of his better seasons; 19 matches brought him only 903 runs at an average of 26.55, with one century. His number of catches reduced to 14.

1972 was another disappointing year. 19 matches resulted in 791 runs averaging at 23.26, again with one century. 1973 saw something of a revival. He scored 760 runs averaging at 29.23 in 16 fixtures, again with a single hundred.

He suffered a severe loss of form the following year. 15 matches brought him only 402 runs with a reduced average of 16.08, with only two scores of over fifty in 27 innings. At the end of the season he retired.

== List A achievements ==
He played in his first List A fixture in 1964 and his last in 1974. He won one match award, in the Gillette Cup semi-final of 1965. Middlesex made 250 for 8 wickets, and his 53* at number seven helped Surrey to make 252 for 5 to win by five wickets.

On 22 July 1966 Surrey played the touring West Indians in a 60 overs a side match. Edwards scored 108* out of 188–9, but the tourists still won by 7 wickets.

== Involvement with the Cricketers' Association ==
He was heavily involved with the Cricketers' Association (now the Professional Cricketers' Association) in its early days. He was appointed its first Treasurer in 1968, and was elected chairman in 1970. He subsequently resigned the post following a majority decision by the membership to accept a donation from the Transvaal in apartheid-era South Africa.

== Cricket coach and administrator ==
He served as the Surrey Cricket Board's director of cricket development for over a decade from 1990. With two assistants, he oversaw cricket coaching in 400 schools. He is a member of the ECB Working Party on Racial Equality.

== The schoolteacher ==
He is a former head of sixth form and later became a deputy head of Tulse Hill School. At the school he taught Economics and helped to chair the divisional Tertiary Education Board for Lambeth [ILEA Division 9].
