= Masood Iqbal =

Pakistani cricketer (1952–2003)

Personal information
- Full name: Masood Iqbal Qureshi
- Born: 17 April 1952; Lahore, Punjab, Pakistan
- Died: 31 October 2003 (aged 51); Lahore, Punjab, Pakistan
- Batting: Right-handed
- Bowling: Wicketkeeper

International information
- National side: Pakistan

Career statistics
Competition	ODI	FC
Matches	1	150
Runs scored	2	2,710
Batting average	2.00	14.11
100s/50s	0/0	0/5
Top score	2	69
Balls bowled	0	168
Wickets	–	3
Bowling average	–	44.66
5 wickets in innings	–	0
10 wickets in match	–	0
Best bowling	–	1/12
Catches/stumpings	0/0	318/58
- Source: Cricinfo, 10 February 2024

Masood Iqbal Qureshi (17 April 1952 – 31 October 2003) was a Pakistani cricketer who played in a single One-day International (ODI) match in 1984. A wicket-keeper, he toured Australia and New Zealand in 1972/73 and England in 1978, but did not play Test cricket.
