= Peter Coman =

New Zealand cricketer

Personal information
- Full name: Peter George Coman
- Born: 13 April 1943 (age 83); Christchurch, New Zealand
- Batting: Right-handed
- Role: Opening batsman

International information
- National side: New Zealand (1973-1974)
- ODI debut (cap 3): 11 February 1973 v Pakistan
- Last ODI: 31 March 1974 v Australia

Domestic team information
- Years: Team
- 1968–1979: Canterbury

Career statistics
Competition	ODI	FC	LA
Matches	3	46	16
Runs scored	62	2,635	413
Batting average	20.66	33.78	27.53
100s/50s	0/0	2/18	0/2
Top score	38	104	67*
Balls bowled	0	240	8
Wickets	–	1	0
Bowling average	–	83.00	–
5 wickets in innings	–	0	0
10 wickets in match	–	0	0
Best bowling	–	1/3	0/16
Catches/stumpings	2/–	20/–	5/–
- Source: Cricinfo, 12 May 2017

Peter George Coman (born 13 April 1943) is a former New Zealand cricketer who played three One Day Internationals in the 1970s. He was the first player to play One Day Internationals and never appear in a Test match.

An opening batsman, Coman was described by Wisden in 1974 as "the most colourful batsman in New Zealand cricket at present". For Canterbury against the touring Pakistan team in January 1973, he hit two sixes in the first over of the match on his way to Canterbury's top score of 42 in a total of 129. A month later, he opened the batting for New Zealand in their first One-Day International, facing the first delivery and scoring 24 in New Zealand's 22-run victory over Pakistan.

In a ten-year career for Canterbury, Coman hit two first-class centuries: 103 not out against Auckland in 1975-76 and 104 against Northern Districts in 1976–77. In one-day matches his highest score was 67 not out when he steered Canterbury to a three-wicket victory over Northern Districts in the final in 1976-77 and won the man of the match award.
