= Zafar Altaf =

Pakistani cricketer, economist and author

Personal information
- Born: 1 August 1941; Agra, Uttar Pradesh, British India
- Died: 5 December 2015 (aged 74); Islamabad, Pakistan
- Batting: Right-handed
- Bowling: Right-arm leg-spin

Domestic team information
- Years: Team
- 1958–59 to 1965–66: Lahore
- 1958–59 to 1959–60: Punjab University
- 1959–60: Pakistan Universities
- 1966–67 to 1967–68: Karachi
- 1970–71 to 1971–72: Rawalpindi

Career statistics
Competition	First-class
Matches	53
Runs scored	2448
Batting average	32.21
100s/50s	4/10
Top score	268
Balls bowled
Wickets	8
Bowling average	37.87
5 wickets in innings	–
10 wickets in match	–
Best bowling	2/12
Catches/stumpings	20/–
- Source: Cricinfo, 3 February 2014

Zafar Altaf (1 August 1941 – 5 December 2015) was a Pakistani cricketer, cricket administrator, economist, senior civil servant, and author, who served as the chairman of the Pakistan Cricket Board in 1999.

== Cricketing career ==
Zafar Altaf made his first-class debut in 1958–59 as a middle-order batsman for Lahore. In his third match he made 99 in the semi-final of the Quaid-e-Azam Trophy against Combined Services, and a few days later hit 111 for Punjab University in a first-class match against Sind University.

He was selected to tour India with the Pakistan team in 1960–61, and scored 262 runs in eight first-class matches at 29.11. Although he did not play in any of the Tests, he took a catch in the First Test in Bombay while fielding as a substitute.

His form fell away in the next two seasons: in six matches he scored only 82 runs. In 1964–65 he hit his second first-class century, 139 not out for Lahore against Punjab University. In 1965–66 he scored 268 for Lahore Greens against Bahawalpur, adding 346 for the fourth wicket with Majid Khan, setting a Pakistan record for a fourth-wicket partnership.

He had his most successful season in 1967–68, scoring 605 runs at 37.81, and returned to the notice of the national selectors. After captaining Lahore Greens against Karachi Blues in the long-delayed final of the 1965–66 Ayub Trophy and scoring 118 and 87, he played for The Rest against a Pakistan XI, scoring 43 in each innings. He played in the Karachi Blues team that won the 1967–68 Ayub Trophy, then captained South Zone to victory against the touring Commonwealth XI in Karachi, in a match brought to life by adventurous declarations by both captains. A few weeks later he captained North Zone against the Commonwealth XI in Peshawar, top-scoring in each innings with 64 not out and 32. He then played in the last of the three matches between Pakistan and the Commonwealth XI, scoring 13 and 5 in a drawn match. He was the only player on the Pakistan side who did not play Test cricket.

He played only six more first-class matches, in 1970–71 and 1971–72, for Rawalpindi, three of them as captain.

== Cricket administration ==
When Abdul Hafeez Kardar became the President of the Pakistan Cricket Board in 1972, he appointed Altaf as his Secretary. He served in that position till 1975. He later served on the national selection committee from the mid-1980s, and as chairman of the committee from 1994 to 1996. He managed the Pakistan team that finished second in the 1999 World Cup.

== Education and civil service career ==
Altaf received an MA in Psychology at the University of the Punjab in 1963, and a PhD in Economics at the University of Birmingham in 1981. He taught economics at three universities in Pakistan.

Dr Altaf worked as an economist in the Pakistan civil service, rising to the position of Federal Secretary for Agriculture, which he occupied for ten years from the early 1990s. He chaired the Pakistan Agriculture Research Council in the 1990s, and again in 2009.

== Death ==
Zafar Altaf died in Islamabad in December 2015 after a cardiac arrest, aged 74.

== Books by Zafar Altaf ==
- Pakistani Entrepreneurs: Their Development, Characteristics and Attitudes 1983
- Entrepreneurship in the Third World: Risk and Uncertainty in Industry in Pakistan 1988
- Rural Transformation 1988
- Agricultural Support Prices in Pakistan: Dogma and Doctrinaire 1989
- Limitations of the Mind 1998
- Lost Capitalism: Essays 1999
- Transforming Pakistan's Agriculture: Options for the Millennium 1999
- Economic Management: Dreams and Hopes 2000
- Poverty: Practical Solutions to Pakistan's Economic Problems 2004
- Working with Benazir, Nawaz and Musharraf c 2004
- Hunger Pains: Pakistan's Food Insecurity 2010
