= Rodney Redmond =

New Zealand cricketer (born 1944)

Personal information
- Full name: Rodney Ernest Redmond
- Born: 29 December 1944 (age 81); Whangārei, New Zealand
- Batting: Left-handed
- Bowling: Slow left-arm orthodox
- Role: Batsman, wicket-keeper
- Relatives: Aaron Redmond (son)

International information
- National side: New Zealand
- Only Test (cap 126): 16 February 1973 v Pakistan
- ODI debut (cap 13): 18 July 1973 v England
- Last ODI: 20 July 1973 v England

Career statistics
Competition	Test	ODI	FC	LA
Matches	1	2	53	10
Runs scored	163	3	3,134	202
Batting average	81.50	3.00	33.69	22.44
100s/50s	1/1	0/0	5/16	0/2
Top score	107	3	141*	71
Balls bowled	–	–	1,472	–
Wickets	–	–	17	–
Bowling average	–	–	28.29	–
5 wickets in innings	–	–	1	–
10 wickets in match	–	–	1	–
Best bowling	–	–	6/56	–
Catches/stumpings	0/–	0/–	31/–	5/–
- Source: Cricinfo, 4 April 2017

Rodney Ernest Redmond (born 29 December 1944) is a New Zealand former international cricketer. He is the father of Aaron Redmond, also a New Zealand international.

== International career ==
Redmond scored a century and a fifty in his only Test match, against Pakistan in 1972–73, giving him a Test batting average of 81.50. His century included 5 successive fours off a Majid Khan over and came at almost a run-a-ball. He also played two One Day Internationals. He was picked for the 1973 tour of England, but showed little form, having trouble with his contact lenses, and was not chosen for the Tests.

== See also ==
- One Test Wonder
