= Mohammad Gulzar Mir =

Pakistani cricket umpire

Personal information
- Full name: Mohammad Gulzar Mir

Umpiring information
- Tests umpired: 1 (1969)
- Source: ESPNcricinfo, 13 July 2013

Mohammad Gulzar Mir is a Pakistani former cricket umpire. He stood in one Test match, Pakistan vs. England, in 1969.

== See also ==
- List of Test cricket umpires
