= Ken Shuttleworth (cricketer) =

English cricketer (1944–2025)

Personal information
- Full name: Kenneth Shuttleworth
- Born: 13 November 1944; St Helens, Lancashire, England
- Died: 19 August 2025 (aged 80); Congleton
- Nickname: Shut
- Batting: Right-handed
- Bowling: Right-arm fast
- Role: Bowler

International information
- National side: England (1970–1971)
- Test debut (cap 446): 27 November 1970 v Australia
- Last Test: 3 June 1971 v Pakistan
- Only ODI (cap 10): 5 January 1971 v Australia

Domestic team information
- Years: Team
- 1964–1975: Lancashire
- 1977–1980: Leicestershire

Career statistics
Competition	Test	ODI	FC	LA
Matches	5	1	239	129
Runs scored	46	7	2,589	374
Batting average	7.66	7.00	16.59	10.68
100s/50s	0/0	0/0	0/3	0/0
Top score	21	7	71	24*
Balls bowled	1,071	56	34,144	6,200
Wickets	12	1	623	174
Bowling average	35.58	29.00	24.51	19.47
5 wickets in innings	1	0	21	2
10 wickets in match	0	0	1	0
Best bowling	5/47	1/29	7/41	5/13
Catches/stumpings	1/–	1/–	128/–	30/–
- Source: Cricinfo, 12 December 2020

Kenneth Shuttleworth (13 November 1944 – 19 August 2025) was an English cricketer. He played five Test matches and one One Day International for England in the early 1970s.

== Career ==
Shuttleworth was born on 13 November 1944 at St Helens, Lancashire. He made his first-class cricket debut for Lancashire in 1964 when he was aged nineteen, tall, raw, but genuinely a fast bowler. He took fifty wickets in 1967, but really started to burst through in 1968, when Brian Statham was fading from the scene. His best season was in 1970, when he took seventy-four wickets at 21.60 runs each, and played for England against The Rest of the World, at Lord's.

He went to Australia with Ray Illingworth's Ashes-winning team and started his Test career with five for 47 at Brisbane. He played five times in all for England - four of them that winter in Australia and New Zealand, the other against Pakistan in 1971 - and took twelve wickets at 35.58 each.

Shuttleworth opened the English bowling with John Snow in the first-ever One Day International, in Melbourne in January 1971. He took the first wicket for England, that of Keith Stackpole. A few weeks later he bowled the first ball in the first-ever List A match in New Zealand, to Bruce Murray. It was a match of 40 eight-ball overs a side, between Wellington and the touring MCC at the Basin Reserve. He also took the first wickets, dismissing both openers, but Wellington won.

Despite having a bowling action to rival Fred Trueman's, Shuttleworth was a great worrier, and when not taking wickets regularly tinkered with his technique. His career never took off as it might have done and loss of form, plus persistent injuries, forced him to leave Lancashire in 1975. He joined Leicestershire, where he played 41 matches between 1977 and 1980. In twelve seasons with Lancashire, Shuttleworth played in 177 matches and took 484 wickets at a cost of 22.92 each. He played in 105 limited-overs matches for the county and took 147 wickets at 18 apiece.

His career-best first-class innings figures were 7 for 41 in 1968, when he and Ken Higgs dismissed Essex for 77. He was a penetrative and economical one-day bowler, with best figures of 5 for 13 off 8 overs against Nottinghamshire in the 1972 John Player League. In 1970 in the John Player League he had figures of 7.4–4–3–4 against Somerset.

== Later life and death ==
After retiring from cricket, Shuttleworth spent ten years working for British Coal in marketing. He then went into partnership with a friend in a civil engineering firm that specialised in dewatering.

Shuttleworth umpired 11 first-class matches between 1998 and 2003. He died in Congleton on 19 August 2025, at the age of 80.
