= Zulfiqar Ali (Pakistani cricketer) =

Pakistani cricketer

Personal information
- Born: 30 December 1969; Pakpattan, Punjab, Pakistan
- Died: 10 March 2003 (aged 33)
- Batting: Right-handed
- Bowling: Right-arm fast-medium
- Role: Bowler

Domestic team information
- Years: Team
- 1985: Multan
- 1986–1990: PIA
- Source: CricketArchive, 2 January 2016

Zulfiqar Ali (30 December 1969 – 10 May 2003) was a Pakistani cricketer who played for Multan and Pakistan International Airlines (PIA) in Pakistani domestic cricket. He played as a right-arm fast bowler.

Zulfiqar was born in Pakpattan, Punjab. He made his first-class debut at the age of 15, playing a Patron's Trophy match for Multan against the Karachi Blues in November 1985. Zulfiqar switched to PIA for the 1986–87 season, and appeared for the team in the Patron's Trophy, the Quaid-i-Azam Trophy, the PACO Cup, and the Wills Cup. He took three five-wicket hauls during the season, with a best of 6/38 against Peshawar. Zulfiqar's 1987–88 domestic season was interrupted by his selection for the Pakistan under-19s at the 1988 Youth World Cup in Australia. He appeared in six of his team's nine matches, including the semi-final and final, and took four wickets with a best of 2/20 against Sri Lanka. In a Quaid-i-Azam match against United Bank Limited in February 1989, Zulfiqar took 7/76, the best figures of his first-class career. He played only two more seasons of top-level Pakistani domestic cricket, however, with his final match at that level coming in October 1990. In total, he took 98 wickets from 29 first-class appearances, as well as 19 wickets from 14 limited-overs matches.
