= Don Shepherd =

Welsh cricketer (1927–2017)

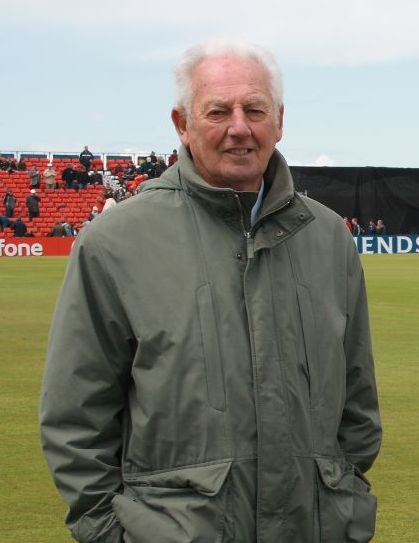
- Shepherd in 2007

Personal information
- Full name: Donald John Shepherd
- Born: 12 August 1927; Port Eynon, Glamorgan, Wales
- Died: 18 August 2017 (aged 90)
- Nickname: Shep
- Batting: Right-handed
- Bowling: Right-arm medium
- Role: Bowler

Domestic team information
- Years: Team
- 1950–1972: Glamorgan
- FC debut: 29 April 1950 Glamorgan v Surrey
- Last FC: 25 August 1972 Glamorgan v Surrey
- LA debut: 12 June 1963 Glamorgan v Worcestershire
- Last LA: 3 September 1972 Glamorgan v Worcestershire

Career statistics
| Competition | First-class | List A |
|---|---|---|
| Matches | 668 | 73 |
| Runs scored | 5,695 | 190 |
| Batting average | 9.65 | 8.26 |
| 100s/50s | 0/5 | 0/0 |
| Top score | 73 | 25* |
| Balls bowled | 132,585 | 3,475 |
| Wickets | 2,218 | 99 |
| Bowling average | 21.32 | 19.56 |
| 5 wickets in innings | 123 | 1 |
| 10 wickets in match | 28 | 0 |
| Best bowling | 9/47 | 5/31 |
| Catches/stumpings | 249/– | 18/– |
- Source: CricketArchive, 20 February 2010

Donald John Shepherd (12 August 1927 – 18 August 2017) was a Welsh cricketer, who played for Glamorgan. One of the great county bowlers, he took more first-class wickets – 2,218 – than any other player who never played Test cricket.

== Career ==
Shepherd began his county career in 1950 as a fast-medium bowler, and was a regular in the Glamorgan team in 1952, when he took 120 wickets.

Over the next three seasons, however, he was less successful and appeared to lose some control. Under advice from team-mates, he switched late in 1955 to bowling off-cutters – off-breaks with a pronounced undercut delivered at almost medium pace. The move was an instant success. In 1956, Shepherd took 177 wickets, more than any other player in that English first-class season, and he took more than 100 wickets in 12 seasons in all. On bad wickets, he could be devastating; on good wickets, his accuracy and the speed of delivery meant that he was usually economical.

Shepherd maintained his fitness into his mid-forties, and was an integral part of the Glamorgan side that won the County Championship in 1969. He was rewarded by being named as a Wisden Cricketer of the Year in 1970, and he celebrated that accolade by taking more wickets, 106, in the 1970 season than any other player in the English first-class game. His tally from a career spanning 23 summers (1950–72) included 28 instances of ten or more in a match and 123 of five or more in an innings.

In a batting side that included some real rabbits – Jeff Jones, Ossie Wheatley – Shepherd batted perhaps higher up the order than he might have in other teams. He averaged less than 10 runs per innings and reached 50 just five times. He could play big shots however and, in 1961, he scored 51 in 15 minutes against the Australians at Swansea, reaching that score with just 11 scoring strokes, six sixes, three fours, a two and a single. Also in 1961, against Derbyshire at Cardiff, he made his top score of 73, hitting six sixes in reaching his 50 in 16 minutes. He took nine wickets when Glamorgan beat the 1964 Australians at Swansea, and captained Glamorgan to victory against the 1968 Australians, again at Swansea.

== Later life ==
Shepherd played regularly to the end of the 1971 season, and then retired from first-class cricket after a few games in 1972. He often appeared as a summariser on BBC Radio Wales coverage of Glamorgan matches.

He died on 18 August 2017, soon after his 90th birthday.
