= Mohammad Ilyas (cricketer) =

Pakistani cricketer (1946–2026)

Personal information
- Full name: Mohammad Ilyas Mahmood
- Born: 19 March 1946; Lahore, Punjab Province, British India
- Died: 12 January 2026 (aged 79); Lahore, Punjab, Pakistan
- Batting: Right-handed
- Bowling: Legbreak
- Relatives: Nazar Mohammad (uncle); Feroz Nizami (uncle); Mudassar Nazar (cousin); Imran Farhat (son-in-law)

International information
- National side: Pakistan
- Test debut (cap 49): 4 December 1964 v Australia
- Last Test: 28 February 1969 v England

Career statistics
Competition	Test	First-class
Matches	10	82
Runs scored	441	4,607
Batting average	23.21	35.71
100s/50s	1/2	12/13
Top score	126	154
Balls bowled	84	1643
Wickets	0	53
Bowling average	–	31.00
5 wickets in innings	–	3
10 wickets in match	–	0
Best bowling	–	6/66
Catches/stumpings	6/–	48/–
- Source: Cricinfo, 5 November 2021

Mohammad Ilyas Mahmood (Urdu: محمد الیاس محمود; 19 March 1946 – 12 January 2026) was a Pakistani cricketer who played in ten Test matches between 1964 and 1969.

== Cricket career ==
Ilyas was an opening batsman and occasional leg-spin bowler. He played first-class cricket in Pakistan from 1961 to 1972. He scored 126 in the Third Test against New Zealand in Karachi in April 1965, when Pakistan needed 202 to win in five and half hours, and reached the target with a session to spare for the loss of only two wickets. His highest first-class score came in December 1964 against South Australia, when he scored 154.

He toured Australia a second time with the Pakistan team in 1972–73, but was injured early in the tour and omitted from the team before it left for the New Zealand leg of the tour. At the time he decided to stay in Australia to live, but he later returned to Pakistan. He served for a time as a national selector, but was dismissed in 2011 for allegedly violating the Pakistan Cricket Board's code of conduct.

== Personal life and death ==
Ilyas was the father-in-law of Imran Farhat. Nazar Mohammad was his uncle.

Ilyas died from cancer in Lahore, on 12 January 2026, at the age of 79.
