= Peter Walker (cricketer, born 1936) =

English cricketer (1936–2020)

Peter Walker MBE
- Walker in 1976

Personal information
- Full name: Peter Michael Walker
- Born: 17 February 1936; Clifton, Bristol, England
- Died: 5 April 2020 (aged 84)
- Batting: Right-handed
- Bowling: Left-arm

International information
- National side: England
- Test debut: 9 June 1960 v South Africa
- Last Test: 7 July 1960 v South Africa

Career statistics
Competition	Test	First-class
Matches	3	469
Runs scored	128	17,650
Batting average	32.00	26.03
100s/50s	0/1	13/92
Top score	52	152*
Balls bowled	78	58,125
Wickets	0	834
Bowling average	–	28.63
5 wickets in innings	–	25
10 wickets in match	–	2
Best bowling	–	7/58
Catches/stumpings	5/–	697/–
- Source: CricInfo, 17 April 2020

Peter Michael Walker MBE (17 February 1936 – 5 April 2020) was an English cricketer, who played in three Test matches for the England cricket team in 1960.

== Playing career ==
Walker was born in Clifton, Bristol, England, but educated partly in South Africa. A tall right-handed middle-order batsman, a left-arm bowler who varied his pace between medium-paced seamers and slow spinners, and a spectacularly good close catcher, specialising in fielding at short-leg, he played all his county cricket for Glamorgan.

For a few years at the beginning of his cricket career, he also played during the English winters for the South African provincial sides, Transvaal and Western Province.

As a batsman, Walker made 1,000 runs in a season eleven times, often seeming to do well when his colleagues faltered. Nevertheless, in seventeen years of first-class cricket he made only thirteen centuries, and his career average of 26 reflected soundness rather than flair, on the unpredictable surfaces that applied in the days of uncovered pitches. His bowling was effective more than penetrating, but, in 1961, he took 101 wickets to achieve the double of 1,000 runs and 100 wickets, and he was not far short in 1959 and 1962. As a fielder, he ranks among the best of all time: he took 697 catches in 469 career matches, and his 73 catches in 1961 – to go alongside his 1,000 runs and 100 wickets – is the third highest figure for a fielder in a single English cricket season, after Wally Hammond and Mickey Stewart; and the best 'treble' – runs, wickets and catches ever recorded in the history of the first-class game.

Walker was picked for three Tests against South Africa who toured England in 1960; he batted well down the order in all three games and hardly bowled at all, but probably did well enough to have expected further chances. But at a time of batting riches for England and spin competition from David Allen, Ray Illingworth and Fred Titmus, he never got back into contention after playing in the first three Tests, all of which England won.

== After cricket ==
He stayed with Glamorgan until 1972 when, after being passed over for the captaincy, he retired to become a cricket writer and broadcaster. For many years, he introduced the BBC Television's coverage of the Sunday League.

In 1985, Walker was the founder and managing director of Merlin Television, which became the largest independent production company in Wales, and after selling out in 1996, became the first chief executive of the newly formed Cricket Board of Wales. He was also largely responsible for the development of the National Cricket Centre for Wales at Glamorgan's home ground at Sophia Gardens in Cardiff.

In 2009, he was elected President of Glamorgan County Cricket Club.

Walker was appointed Member of the Order of the British Empire (MBE) in the 2011 New Year Honours for services to cricket.

He died on 5 April 2020 at the age of 84, after a stroke.

== Books ==
- Winning Cricket (1965)
- Cricket Conversations (1978)
- The All-Rounder (1979)
- It's Not Just Cricket (autobiography) (Fairfield Books, 2006, ISBN 0-9544-8864-4)
