= Murawwat Hussain =

Pakistani cricketer and umpire (1918–1984)

Personal information
- Full name: Murawwat Hussain Shah
- Born: 8 August 1918; Sialkot, Punjab Province, British India
- Died: 25 September 1984 (aged 66); Lahore, Pakistan
- Batting: Right-handed
- Bowling: Right-arm medium-pace

Umpiring information
- Tests umpired: 1 (1959)

Career statistics
Competition	First-class
Matches	37
Runs scored	1468
Batting average	29.36
100s/50s	4/4
Top score	164
Balls bowled	2864
Wickets	44
Bowling average	28.36
5 wickets in innings	0
10 wickets in match	0
Best bowling	4/27
Catches/stumpings	24/–
- Source: ESPNcricinfo, 13 July 2013

Murawwat Hussain (8 August 1918 – 25 September 1984) was a Pakistani cricketer and umpire.

A right-handed batsman and medium-pace bowler, Murawwat Hussain played first-class cricket in India and Pakistan from 1935 to 1954, and toured Ceylon with the Pakistan team in 1948-49. In the second of the two matches between Pakistan and Ceylon he made his highest first-class score, 164, and he and Nazar Mohammad put on 269 for the second wicket.

He umpired 52 first-class matches in Pakistan, mostly in Lahore or Bahawalpur, from 1957 to 1978. He stood in one Test match, the First Test of the series between Pakistan and West Indies in 1959, played at the National Stadium, Karachi.

== See also ==
- List of Test cricket umpires
