= Talat Ali =

Pakistani cricketer (born 1950)

Personal information
- Full name: Talat Ali Malik
- Born: 29 May 1950 (age 76); Lahore, Punjab, Pakistan
- Batting: Right-handed
- Bowling: Right-arm medium

International information
- National side: Pakistan
- Test debut (cap 66): 22 December 1972 v Australia
- Last Test: 23 February 1979 v New Zealand

Career statistics
Competition	Test	First-class
Matches	10	115
Runs scored	370	7,296
Batting average	23.12	38.39
100s/50s	0/2	15/32
Top score	61	258
Balls bowled	20	411
Wickets	0	2
Bowling average	–	123.50
5 wickets in innings	–	0
10 wickets in match	–	0
Best bowling	–	1/32
Catches/stumpings	4/–	43/–
- Source: ESPNcricinfo, 19 June 2017

Talat Ali Malik (born 29 May 1950) is a former Pakistani cricketer who played in ten Test matches from 1972 to 1979. He served as international match referee as well. He was the manager of the Pakistan Cricket Team from October 2006 until his resignation 17 October 2008 following the Quadrangular four-nation Twenty20 series in Canada, in which Pakistan lost to Sri Lanka in the final

Talat Ali Malik is the grandson of Malik Barkat Ali, one of the Pioneers of Freedom commemorated by a stamp issued by the government of Pakistan, for his pivotal role in the establishment of the nation, working with his close allies and friends Muhammed Ali Jinnah and Allama Iqbal.

Talat Ali Malik also worked for Pakistan International Airlines for three decades, in Senior Management, as general manager and Director of operations before retiring. His eldest son works in academia at Imperial College, in South Kensington at the Dyson School of Engineering.
