= Asif Masood =

Pakistani cricketer (born 1946)

Personal information
- Full name: Syed Asif Masood Shah
- Born: 23 January 1946 (age 80); Lahore, Punjab, Pakistan
- Batting: Right-handed
- Bowling: Right-arm medium-fast

International information
- National side: Pakistan (1969-1977)
- Test debut (cap 57): 21 February 1969 v England
- Last Test: 1 January 1977 v Australia
- ODI debut (cap 2): 11 February 1973 v New Zealand
- Last ODI: 16 October 1976 v New Zealand

Career statistics
Competition	Test	ODI	FC
Matches	16	7	121
Runs scored	93	10	635
Batting average	10.33	5.00	8.69
100s/50s	0/0	0/0	0/0
Top score	30*	6	34
Balls bowled	3,038	402	17,706
Wickets	38	5	305
Bowling average	41.26	46.79	29.02
5 wickets in innings	1	0	9
10 wickets in match	0	0	0
Best bowling	5/111	2/9	8/97
Catches/stumpings	5/–	1/–	38/–
- Source: ESPNCricinfo, 29 May 2026

Syed Asif Masood Shah (Urdu: آصف مسعود شاہ; born 23 January 1946) is a former Pakistani cricketer who played in 16 Test matches and 7 One Day Internationals from 1969 to 1977. He was educated at Islamia College Lahore.

Masood grew up in the Mochi Gate area of Lahore and attended Muslim Model High School before going on to Islamia College. He did not take up cricket seriously until 1958–59, and joined Universal Cricket Club in Lahore in 1961. He later excelled in the Wazir Ali Summer League and inter-university cricket, where he emerged as one of Punjab University's leading pace bowlers.

He made his first-class debut for Lahore Whites against Karachi Blues in the 1963–64 Quaid-e-Azam Trophy, taking 4 for 98. After missing a season because of a back injury, he returned to take 20 wickets at 16.70 for Punjab University in the 1967–68 Ayub Trophy. In the same phase of his domestic career, he took 5 for 59 against Sargodha and then recorded career-best first-class figures of 8 for 97 against Lahore Greens.

Masood made his Test debut for Pakistan against England at Lahore in February 1969, taking four wickets in the match. His finest international performance came in the 1971 tour of England, when he took 5 for 111 in England's first innings and 4 for 49 in the second at Edgbaston, finishing with match figures of 9 for 160 in a drawn Test. The performance led to his selection for the World XI for the 1971–72 series in Australia.

On Pakistan's 1974 tour of England, Masood played an important role in the team's unbeaten first-class campaign. Against Middlesex at Lord's, he took five wickets in 11 balls, including a hat-trick, and he finished the tour with 29 first-class wickets at an average of 20.79. In the second ODI at Edgbaston later that summer, he took 2 for 9 and was named player of the match as Pakistan won the Prudential Trophy series 2–0.

Although primarily a specialist bowler, Masood occasionally contributed useful lower-order runs. In the first Test against England at Headingley in 1974, he made 4 not out in a last-wicket stand of 62 with Sarfraz Nawaz. His highest Test score was an unbeaten 30 against the West Indies at Lahore in February 1975. His unusual run-up, beginning with a backward step, prompted John Arlott to liken him to "Groucho Marx chasing a pretty waitress".

Masood's international career ended after the 1976–77 tour of Australia. After marrying in the UK, he became a businessman, owning first a travel agency then a post office in Bury, Lancashire. He currently resides in Bury with his wife and four children.
