= Aftab Gul =

Pakistani cricketer (born 1946)

Personal information
- Full name: Aftab Gul Khan
- Born: 31 March 1946 (age 80); Gujjar Khan, British India
- Batting: Right-handed
- Bowling: Legbreak
- Role: Opening batsman

International information
- National side: Pakistan
- Test debut (cap 57): 21 February 1969 v England
- Last Test: 8 July 1971 v England

Career statistics
Competition	Test	First-class
Matches	6	101
Runs scored	182	6,179
Batting average	22.75	36.77
100s/50s	0/0	11/42
Top score	33	140
Balls bowled	6	745
Wickets	–	14
Bowling average	–	34.50
5 wickets in innings	–	0
10 wickets in match	–	0
Best bowling	–	2/20
Catches/stumpings	3/–	48/–
- Source: ESPNCricinfo, 15 June 2017

Aftab Gul Khan (Urdu: آفتاب گل خان) (born 31 March 1946) is a Pakistani former cricketer who played in six Test matches from 1969 to 1971.

Gul was an opening batsman who represented a number of first-class sides in Pakistan from 1964–65 to 1977–78. His initial selection in the Test side, when England toured Pakistan during 1968-69 amid political turmoil, had less to do with his cricketing abilities than with his position as a student leader, in an attempt to placate the rioters.

Gul scored more than 1000 runs on the tour of England in 1971. In the first over of the First Test at Birmingham in that series, he was struck on the head by a ball from Alan Ward and was forced to retire. This injury drew the famous line from Brian Johnston on the BBC the next day: "Gul's all right. The doctor inspected his head this morning and found nothing in it." He also toured England in 1974 but was less successful and did not play any of the Tests.

He is a lawyer by profession. Gul initially represented the cricketer Salman Butt in the 2010 Pakistan cricket spot-fixing scandal.
