= Commonwealth XI cricket team =

The Commonwealth XI cricket team played over 100 first-class cricket matches from 1949 to 1968. The team started out as a side made up of mostly English, Australian and West Indian cricketers, that toured the subcontinent but later on played first-class fixtures in England. They also toured South Africa and Rhodesia.

== Tours of the Subcontinent ==
=== 1949/50 ===
The Commonwealth team, captained by Jock Livingston, played 17 first-class matches in India and two each in Ceylon and Pakistan.

=== 1950/51 ===
Les Ames, another Englishman, led the team on this occasion and they appeared in 25 first-class matches in India as well as two in Ceylon.

=== 1953/54 ===
Australian Ben Barnett captained the Commonwealth XI on this tour of India which consisted of 22 first-class matches.

=== 1963/64 ===
Captained by Peter Richardson, a Commonwealth XI toured Pakistan in November and December 1963, playing six first-class matches including three against the Pakistan national team. The three unofficial Tests were all drawn.

=== 1964/65 ===
Peter Richardson's Commonwealth team played just one first-class match in India, against the Bengal Chief Minister's XI.

=== 1967/68 ===
A Commonwealth side toured Pakistan under the captaincy of Richie Benaud. Roger Prideaux and Tony Lewis captained the team in some matches.

== Tours of South Africa and Rhodesia ==
In October 1959, the Commonwealth XI played three first-class matches in South Africa and in a tour of Rhodesia in September, 1962, they played a further two.

== Matches in England ==
All other matches played by the Commonwealth team were in England and mostly against a side called the England XI. The only exceptions were matches against the touring Indians in 1952 and Essex in 1953.
