= Nasim-ul-Ghani =

Pakistani cricketer (born 1941)

Personal information
- Born: 14 May 1941; Delhi, British India
- Batting: Left-handed
- Bowling: Slow left-arm orthodox

International information
- National side: Pakistan (1958–1973)
- Test debut (cap 26): 17 January 1958 v West Indies
- Last Test: 6 January 1973 v Australia
- Only ODI (cap 6): 11 February 1973 v New Zealand

Career statistics
| Competition | Test | ODI | FC |
|---|---|---|---|
| Matches | 29 | 1 | 117 |
| Runs scored | 747 | 1 | 4,490 |
| Batting average | 16.60 | 1.00 | 28.41 |
| 100s/50s | 1/2 | 0/0 | 7/23 |
| Top score | 101 | 1 | 139 |
| Balls bowled | 4,406 | – | 21,041 |
| Wickets | 52 | – | 343 |
| Bowling average | 37.67 | – | 25.16 |
| 5 wickets in innings | 2 | – | 23 |
| 10 wickets in match | 0 | – | 3 |
| Best bowling | 6/67 | – | 6/24 |
| Catches/stumpings | 11/– | 0/– | 104/– |
- Source: ESPNcricinfo, 13 June 2016

Nasim-ul-Ghani (born 14 May 1941) is a Pakistani former cricketer who played in 29 Test matches and one One Day International between 1958 and 1973. At the time of his debut, aged 16 years, he was the world's youngest Test player.

He became the first nightwatchman to score a century when he hit 101 against England at Lord's in 1962. This was his only century in Test cricket, and it was also the first century by a Pakistani in England.

A slow left-arm bowler, Nasim-ul-Ghani is the youngest person to take five wickets in a Test innings. He was aged 16 years 303 days when he took 5 for 116 against West Indies in 1958.

Nasim later played Minor County cricket for Staffordshire from 1969 to 1978.

== Post-retirement ==
He has served as national selector and as an ICC Match Referee in two Test Matches and 9 ODIs.
