= Saleem Altaf =

Pakistani cricketer (born 1944)

Personal information
- Full name: Syed Saleem Altaf Bokhari
- Born: 19 April 1944 (age 82); Lahore, British India
- Batting: Right-handed
- Bowling: Right-arm fast-medium

International information
- National side: Pakistan (1967–1978)
- Test debut (cap 53): 27 July 1967 v England
- Last Test: 27 October 1978 v India
- ODI debut (cap 8): 11 February 1973 v New Zealand
- Last ODI: 3 November 1978 v India

Career statistics
Competition	Test	ODI	FC
Matches	21	6	143
Runs scored	276	25	3,066
Batting average	14.52	25.00	22.71
100s/50s	0/1	0/0	1/11
Top score	53*	21	111
Balls bowled	4,001	285	20,358
Wickets	46	5	336
Bowling average	37.17	30.19	28.50
5 wickets in innings	0	0	8
10 wickets in match	0	0	1
Best bowling	4/11	2/7	7/69
Catches/stumpings	3/–	1/–	63/–
- Source: ESPNCricinfo, 7 June 2017

Syed Saleem Altaf Bokhari (born 19 April 1944) is a former Pakistani cricketer who played in 21 Test matches and six One Day Internationals from 1967 to 1978.

An opening bowler, Saleem Altaf played first-class cricket in Pakistan from 1963–64 to 1978–79. He toured England with the Pakistan team in 1967 and 1971, Australia and New Zealand in 1972–73, Australia in 1976–77, and West Indies in 1976–77. His most successful series was in Australia in 1972–73, when he took 11 wickets at 28.45 in the three Tests, bowling at a brisk pace and "swinging the ball late and seaming it disconcertingly".

His best Test figures were 4 for 11 (14.3-9-11-4) in the Third Test against England in 1971. His top score was 53 not out against New Zealand in the Third Test in 1972–73. In first-class cricket, his best figures were 7 for 69 (11 for 155 in the match) for Punjab University against Lahore Greens in 1965–66. Touring West Indies in 1976-77 he took 5 for 6 off 4.1 overs against the Leeward Islands, including a hat-trick. His only century was 111 (followed by 56 not out in the second innings) for PIA against Sind in 1976–77.

After retirement, Altaf worked as Director, Cricket Operations for the Pakistan Cricket Board (PCB) from 2004 to 2006 and later as Director, Special Projects from 2006 to 2008. He was dismissed on 12 June 2008, after he allegedly leaked to the media an email sent by PCB Chairman Naseem Ashraf to Talat Ali (Pakistan team manager) in which Ashraf demanded an explanation for Pakistan's 140-run loss to India in Bangladesh. It was alleged that Altaf's phone was tapped in order to incriminate him of leaking sensitive correspondence to the press.

== See also ==
- Naeem Bokhari, younger brother
