= English cricket team in Pakistan in 1972–73 =

International cricket tour

The England national cricket team toured Pakistan in March 1973 and played a three-match Test series against the Pakistan national cricket team which was drawn 0–0. England were captained by Tony Lewis and Pakistan by Majid Khan. The English team had come straight from a five-Test tour of India and a short visit to Sri Lanka.

== Touring team ==
- Tony Lewis (captain)
- Dennis Amiss
- Geoff Arnold
- Jack Birkenshaw
- Bob Cottam
- Mike Denness
- Keith Fletcher
- Norman Gifford
- Tony Greig
- Alan Knott
- Chris Old
- Pat Pocock
- Graham Roope
- Roger Tolchard
- Derek Underwood
- Barry Wood

Donald Carr was the manager.

== Test series summary ==
=== First Test ===
2–7 March 1973
(5-day match)
Scorecard

England	v	Pakistan
355 (143.3 overs); DL Amiss 112; Mushtaq Mohammad 3/21 (8.3 overs)		422 (158.2 overs); Sadiq Mohammad 119; AW Greig 4/86 (29.2 overs)
306/7d (119 overs); AR Lewis 74; Intikhab Alam 4/80 (35 overs)		124/3 (38 overs); Talat Ali 57; AW Greig 2/28 (6 overs)

Match drawn
Lahore Stadium, Lahore
Umpires: Daud Khan and Shujauddin

- England won the toss and elected to bat.
- 5 March was taken as a rest day.

=== Second Test ===
16–21 March 1973
(5-day match)
Scorecard

England	v	Pakistan
487 (200.2 overs); DL Amiss 158; Mushtaq Mohammad 4/93 (35 overs)		569/9d (192 overs); Mushtaq Mohammad 157; PI Pocock 5/169 (52 overs)
218/6 (85 overs); AW Greig 64; Intikhab Alam 3/44 (19 overs)

Match drawn
Niaz Stadium, Hyderabad
Umpires: Aslam Khokhar and Shujauddin

- England won the toss and elected to bat.
- 19 March was taken as a rest day.

=== Third Test ===
24–29 March 1973
(5-day match)
Scorecard

Pakistan	v	England
445/6d (154 overs); Majid Khan 99; Mushtaq Mohammad 99; PI Pocock 2/93 (38 overs)		386 (156.3 overs); DL Amiss 99; Intikhab Alam 4/105 (39 overs)
199 (72.3 overs); Wasim Bari 41; N Gifford 5/55 (29 overs)		30/1 (10 overs); DL Amiss 21*; Saleem Altaf 1/16 (5 overs)

Match drawn
National Stadium, Karachi
Umpires: Aslam Khokhar and Daud Khan

- Pakistan won the toss and elected to bat.
- 26 March was taken as a rest day.
