= Bob Cottam =

English cricketer (born 1944)

Personal information
- Full name: Robert Michael Henry Cottam
- Born: 16 October 1944 (age 82); Cleethorpes, Lincolnshire, England
- Height: 6 ft 3 in (1.91 m)
- Batting: Right-handed
- Bowling: Right-arm fast-medium
- Relatives: Andy Cottam (son); Michael Cottam (son)

International information
- National side: England
- Test debut (cap 441): 21 February 1969 v Pakistan
- Last Test: 30 December 1972 v India

Domestic team information
- Years: Team
- 1963–1971: Hampshire
- 1972–1976: Northamptonshire
- 1977–1978: Devon

Career statistics
Competition	Test	FC	LA
Matches	4	289	133
Runs scored	27	1,278	262
Batting average	6.75	6.98	5.57
100s/50s	0/0	0/1	0/0
Top score	13	62*	23*
Balls bowled	903	53,053	6,605
Wickets	14	1,010	180
Bowling average	23.35	20.91	22.55
5 wickets in innings	0	58	8
10 wickets in match	0	6	0
Best bowling	4/50	9/25	4/9
Catches/stumpings	2/–	153/–	37/–
- Source: ESPNcricinfo, 9 May 2010

Robert Michael Henry Cottam (born 16 October 1944) is an English former professional cricketer who played in four Test matches between 1969 and 1972 and in English county cricket with Hampshire from 1963 to 1971 and Northamptonshire from 1972 to 1976, before spending two years playing minor counties cricket with Devon in 1977 and 1978. During the 1960s with Hampshire, Cottam was part of a three-pronged pace bowling attack that consisted of himself, Derek Shackleton, and Butch White. Against Lancashire in the 1965 County Championship, he took figures of 9 wickets for 25 runs, the best innings bowling figures by a Hampshire player as of 2026.

He made his Test debut for England against Pakistan in February 1969 on the winter tour to Ceylon and Pakistan, playing two of the three Test matches on the tour and finishing as England's leading wicket-taker. Having felt unsettled at Hampshire, Cottam moved to Northamptonshire ahead of the 1972 season. While playing for Northamptonshire, Cottam earned a recall to the Test team, playing two further Test matches against India on the 1972–73 winter tour. He left Northamptonshire at the end of the 1976 season, and briefly played minor counties cricket for Devon. In 289 first-class matches, he took over 1,000 wickets, and in 133 List A one-day matches he took 180 wickets. At Test level, he took 14 wickets.

Moving into coaching, Cottam was the National Cricket Association's chief coach for the West Country. In 1988, he was appointed cricket manager at Warwickshire, where he won the 1989 NatWest Trophy. He left the county at the end of the 1991 season, following a dispute with its captain Andy Lloyd and their cricket committee. He then joined Somerset as their director of coaching in December 1991, a role he held until the conclusion of the 1996 season. After leaving Someset, he was bowling coach for the England team between 1998 and 2001, later assisting Scotland in 2005.

== Early life ==
Cottam was born in Cleethorpes on 16 October 1944. His family moved south to Alperton near Wembley as a child, where he was educated at Lyon Park Primary School and captained a combined Wembley Primary Schools side. He then spent a year at Alperton County School, before his parents relocated to Berkshire, where Cottam was attended The Piggott School, and represented combined Berkshire schools. He received coaching from Alf Gover and at the Middlesex indoor school in Finchley; despite the latter, he came to the attention of Hampshire, and began playing for their Second XI in 1961.

== Cricket career ==
=== Early years at Hampshire ===
Cottam made his debut in first-class cricket for Hampshire against Kent at Southampton in the 1963 County Championship. With fast bowler Derek Shackleton playing for England during the summer, Cottam gained opportunities to play in the first team throughout the summer, making 13 appearances in the Championship. With his right-arm fast-medium bowling, he took 48 wickets at a bowling average of 24.04; he took five-wickets or more in an innings on three occasions, with his season-best figures of 6 wickets for 10 runs taking Hampshire to victory against Leicestershire at Portsmouth in August. He played less in the first eleven during the 1964 season, making 11 appearances and taking 25 wickets at 27.52. He debuted in List A one-day cricket in 1964, against Wiltshire in the first round of the 1964 Gillette Cup, with his 4 for 9 leading Hampshire to victory. He then played in their second-round defeat to Warwickshire.

Cottam established himself in the side in 1965, making 22 first-class appearances. Against Lancashire in the County Championship at Old Trafford, he took 9 for 25 in their first innings to trigger a batting collapse from 102 for 2 to 136 all out; in Lancashire's unsuccessful chase of 116 runs, Cottam did not take any further wickets. His 9 for 25 were the best innings figures by a Hampshire bowler, a record which remains as of 2026. Across the season, he took 73 wickets at 18.31, with three further five-wicket hauls; he took ten-wickets in a match for the first time, against Kent in July, taking 6 for 38 and 4 for 36. In one-day cricket, he made three appearances in Hampshire's run to the quarter-final of the Gillette Cup, taking 8 wickets at 14.37. Cottam's form in 1965 led to speculation that he might be selected for England's winter tour to Australia, but he was not chosen in the 12-man touring party. At the beginning of the 1966 season, he played for the Marylebone Cricket Club (MCC) against Yorkshire at Lord's. For Hampshire that season, he made 18 appearances in the County Championship, taking 61 wickets at 19.32. He also made four one-day appearances in Hampshire's run to the semi-final in the Gillette Cup, taking 9 wickets at 17.22.

Cottam took over a hundred first-class wickets in the 1967 season, with 102 from 28 matches, averaging 19.76. Across the season, he took five or more wickets in an innings on five occasions, with best figures of 7 for 50 against Nottinghamshire in the County Championship in May, in a performance the Nottingham Evening Post described as "hostile". Against Middlesex in the Championship in August, Cottam was last-man out in Hampshire's chase of 167, with his dismissal to Bob Herman resulting in the first tied first-class match since December 1961. He played three matches in the 1967 Gillette Cup, taking 5 wickets as Hampshire reached the competition's quarter-final. The 1968 season was to be his most successful as a bowler, with Cottam taking 130 wickets at an average of 17.56 from 31 first-class matches; he was the leading wicket-taker in the Championship in 1968, with 122 wickets, 18 more than Ken Higgs. Amongst his the nine five wicket hauls he took in 1968, was his 6 for 35 in the final afternoon of the Championship match against Gloucestershire, that set up Hampshire's five wicket victory. In June at Basingstoke, he took 7 for 61 against Warwickshire, with overall match figures of 10 for 87, and in July, he took 6 for 14 to dismiss Nottinghamshire for 85 runs. His form during the season led to his selection for the MCC President's XI against the touring Australians at Lord's in August, where he took two wickets. He was named Cricket Writers' Club Young Cricketer of the Year in October 1968.

=== Test debut ===
Cottam's form in 1968 led to his selection for the MCC winter tour to South Africa, (Note: The MCC held the responsibility of organising overseas tours from 1903 to 1977. All matches on a tour were played as MCC, except for Test matches, where the side played as England.) though the tour was ultimately cancelled in the wake of the D'Oliveira affair. He went on the MCC tour to Ceylon and Pakistan in early 1969, where he made his Test debut for England against Pakistan at Lahore on 21 February, taking 4 for 50 and 2 for 35 in the Pakistani first and second innings respectively. Four days after the conclusion of the first Test, Cottam played in the second Test at Dacca, taking three wickets across the match. He did not play in the third Test at Karachi. With 9 wickets, Cottam was England's leading wicket taker in the Test matches. Prior to the Test series, he played in the first-class fixture against Ceylon at Colombo, and in Pakistan he played in three first-class matches.

Cottam made 25 first-class appearances in the 1969 English season, taking over a hundred wickets (109 at 21.04) in consecutive seasons; he was the second highest wicket-taker in the County Championship, with 100 wickets, three behind Mike Procter. Amongst the eight five wicket hauls he took during the season was 7 for 32 in a defeat against Nottinghamshire at Basingstoke in the final Championship match of the season. With further proliferation of the one-day game in county cricket during the 1969 season, which came via the introduction of Sunday League, Cottam found played regular one-day cricket. He made 17 one-day appearances in 1969, helping Hampshire finish second in the inaugural Player's County League. In these, he took 22 wickets at an average of 21. Alongside fellow fast bowler Butch White, Cottam had threatened to leave Hampshire in 1969, unless his wages were bought up into line with Barry Richards; both Cottam and White reached an amicable agreement and remained with Hampshire heading into the 1970s. Following the retirement of Shackleton after the 1969 season, Cottam led the Hampshire attack alongside White, however, an injury in July ruled White out for the remainder of the season. Cottam took 77 wickets at 25.81 in 22 first-class matches, whilst in 15 one-day appearances he took 12 wickets at 39.25, which was the lowest one-day return of his career.

Following the 1970 season, Cottam toured Pakistan with an International XI, playing three first-class matches against a BCCP XI, taking 12 wickets across the matches. In the 1971 season, he made 23 first-class appearances, taking 80 wickets at 22.30; he twice took ten-wickets in a match in 1971, against Northamptonshire (11 for 80) in May, and Essex (10 for 95) in July. He made 17 appearances in one-day cricket in 1971, taking 23 wickets at 21. Following the season, Cottam requested an immediate release from his contract, having felt unsettled at Hampshire for the last two years.

=== Move to Northamptonshire ===
Despite interest from Leicestershire and Middlesex, Cottam joined Northamptonshire. His move, and that of Bob Willis from Surrey to Warwickshire, paved the way for a change in the rule for players transferring between counties; they previously had to wait a year before they could appear in a competitive match for a new county. Although their applications to forgo the one-year qualification period were not supported by their counties, the registration sub-committee of the Test and County Cricket Board clear Cottam to play for Northamptonshire in the County Championship from 17 June 1971, causing him to miss a handful of matches at the beginning of the 1972 season. He made 15 first-class appearances for Northamptonshire during the season, taking 50 wickets at 18.36; he took five wickets or more six times and ten-wickets in a match once. His best figures, 8 for 14, came in a friendly first-class match against Oxford University, prior to his Championship participation. In one-day cricket, he made seven appearances, taking 10 wickets at 19.80.

Despite missing the start of the 1972 season, Cottam's form for its remainder earned him a recall for the MCC's winter tour of India, Pakistan and Sri Lanka. On the Indian leg of the tour, he featured in two first-class warm-up matches, before playing in the first Test against India at Delhi, taking two wickets in the match. He then played in the second Test at Calcutta, taking three wickets across the game. He did not play in the final three Test matches against India, nor did he feature in the three Test matches that followed against Pakistan, having been dropped in favour of Geoff Arnold. He did, however, play a handful of first-class matches following his Test apprearances. In the 1973 English season, Cottam made 24 first-class appearances, taking 76 wickets at 20.27, with four five wicket hauls. He played during the season for the MCC against the touring New Zealanders, and at the second concluding Scarborough Festival for T. N. Pearce's XI against the touring West Indians. In one-day cricket, he took 27 wickets at 18.77 from 17 matches.

Cottam made just 14 first-class appearances in 1974, having torn ankle ligaments in June which were expected to rule him out for two to three weeks, but he ended up missing six. Despite injury, he managed to take 56 first-class wickets at 19.66, claiming five wickets or more in an innings on four occasions, whilst in 15 one-day matches, he took 23 wickets at 18.04. The following season, he made 18 first-class appearances, taking 30 wickets at 32.73, and took 16 wickets at 32.25 from 17 one-day matches. In the 1976 season, he made just eight first-class appearances. After a strong start to the season, including performances of 6 for 55 and 7 for 39 in Northamptonshire's opening Championship match against Lancashire, and 7 for 100 against Kent. Cottam suffered an injury in early July, at which point in the season he had taken 36 first-class wickets at 16.22, and 11 one-day wickets at 39.09 from 12 matches. He was released by Northamptonshire later in July.

=== Minor Counties cricket ===
Cottam joined minor county Devon as their professional ahead of the 1977 season. He made eight appearances in the 1977 Minor Counties Championship, and was the second highest wicket-taker in the competition with 43 at 12.44, two behind Suffolk's Robin Hobbs. The following season, he made one appearance in the Minor Counties Championship, and made a one-day appearance in the Gillette Cup first round defeat to Staffordshire. He was the last professional to be employed by Devon until Peter Trego and Wayne White in 2019.

== Playing style and statistics ==
Cottam was a tall 6 foot 3 inches (1.9 metres), right-arm fast-medium bowler who bowled with a slingy action. The cricket writer Christopher Martin-Jenkins described him as a "persistent" bowler with good stamnia, with fellow cricket writer Martin Williamson noting that he bowled with "unerring accuracy". Writing in the Sports Argus, the journalist W. C. Wanklyn observed that his bowling was a "great deal quicker" than it looked. When he moved to Northamptonshire, he reduced the speed of his bowling and came to rely more upon delivering cutters to dismiss batsmen. The cricket writer Bill Frindall opined that he was a "daunting prospect on responsive pitches", where he was able to extract sharp bounce. Martin-Jenkins later wrote the Cottam was an effective one-day bowler.

Cottam made 289 first-class appearances, taking 1,010 wickets at 20.91; he took five wickets or more in an innings 58 times, and ten wickets in a match six. He took over 1,000 wickets in a season three times. For Hampshire, he made 188 first-class appearances, taking 693 wickets at 20.71, taking 38 five wicket hauls for the county. For Northamptonshire, he took 241 first-class wickets at 20.23 from 76 matches, with 17 five wicket hauls. In one-day cricket, he took 180 wickets at 22.55 from 133 matches. For Hampshire in one-day cricket, he took 91 wickets at 21.15 from 63 matches, while for Northamptonshire he made 68 appearances, taking 87 wickets at 23.74. Although better suited to English conditions, his only Test caps came on tours of the subcontinent, where the selectors favoured his cutters on turning wickets; although it transpired that the pitches did not favour him, he still took 14 wickets at 23.35 at Test level. A tailend batsman, he scored 1,278 first-class runs in his career, at a batting average of 6.98; he made one half-century, an unbeaten 62 runs. In the field, he took a total of 153 catches at first-class level.

== Coaching career ==
Following the end of his first-class playing career, Cottam took up a coaching position at a school in Lyme Regis in Dorset, before coaching at Seaton, Devon. In December 1981, he was the National Cricket Association's chief cricket coach for the West Country, a role he held until 1987, when he was appointed Warwickshire's cricket manager. The county won the 1989 NatWest Trophy under his management. He left Warwickshire in October 1990, following a feud with captain Andy Lloyd, and citing "a total lack of confidence" with their cricket committee.

In December 1991, Cottam signed a five-year contract with Somerset to become their coaching director, but was released by Someset following the 1996 season, with one-year still left on his contract. He returned to Warwickshire in November 1996, as a part-time bowling consultant. He was chosen by England's coach David Lloyd in June 1998, a role he maintained until 2001; He expressed his "utter disappointment" in being replaced by Graham Dilley for England's winter tours to New Zealand and India. During his time with England, he developed the new ball bowling pair of Andy Caddick and Darren Gough, and helped Dominic Cork rediscover the ability to swing the ball. In March 2005, Cottam joined Scotland's coaching staff ahead of the 2005 ICC Trophy, and in December of the same year he was coaching at the International Cricket Council's Winter Training Centre in Pretoria.

== Personal life ==
Cottam has been married twice, firstly to Jackie, and secondly to Yvonne. He has three sons: Andy, David, and Michael. Andy played first-class cricket for Derbyshire and Somerset, while Michael played minor counties cricket for Devon. As of 2023, Cottam was living in Dartmouth, Devon.

== Works cited ==
- Arlott, John (1985). Arlott on Cricket: His Writings on the Game. London: Fontana. ISBN 978-0-0063-7007-9 – via Internet Archive.
- Bateman, Colin (1993). If the Cap Fits. Harrow: Tony Williams Publications. ISBN 978-1-8698-3321-3 – via Internet Archive.
- Frindall, Bill (1989). England Test Cricketers: The Complete Record from 1877. London: Willow. ISBN 978-0-0021-8339-0 – via Internet Archive.
- Martin-Jenkins, Christopher (1996). World Cricketers: A Biographical Dictionary. Oxford University Press. ISBN 978-0-1921-0005-4 – via Internet Archive.
- Wilde, Simon (2018). England: The Biography. London: Simon & Schuster. ISBN 978-1-4711-5486-7.
- Williams, Jack (2001). Cricket and Race. Oxford: Berg Publishers. ISBN 978-1-8597-3304-2 – via Internet Archive.
- Williams, Jack (2012). Cricket and England: A Cultural and Social History of Cricket in England Between the Wars. Milton Park: Taylor & Francis. ISBN 978-1-1363-1713-2.
