= Cottam =

Cottam may refer to:

== Places ==
- Cottam, East Riding of Yorkshire, England
- Cottam, Lancashire, England
- Cottam, Nottinghamshire, England
- Cottam, Ontario, Canada

== People with the surname Cottam ==
- Andy Cottam (born 1973), English cricketer
- Bob Cottam (born 1944), English cricketer
- Brad Cottam (born 1984), American football player
- Clarence Cottam (1899–1974), American conservationist and zoologist
- Francis Cottam (1900–1987), English cricketer
- Harold Cottam (1891–1984), British wireless operator on the RMS Carpathia during the Titanic disaster
- John Cottam (1867–1897), Australian cricketer
- John Cottam (footballer) (born 1950), English footballer
- Michael Cottam (born 1966), English cricketer
- Nicholas Cottam (born 1951), British Army officer
- S. E. Cottam (1863–1943), English poet and Anglican priest
- Thomas Cottam (1549–1582), English Catholic priest and martyr

== Other uses ==
- Cottam railway station, a disused station in Nottinghamshire, England
- Cottam power stations, coal and gas powered electricity generating stations in Nottinghamshire, England
- RAF Cottam, a World War II station in the East Riding of Yorkshire

== See also ==
- Coatham, a district of Redcar, North Yorkshire
- Coatham Mundeville, a village near Darlington, County Durham
- Cotham (disambiguation)
