= West Indian cricket team in India, Pakistan and Ceylon in 1948–49 =

International cricket tour

West Indies cricket team in India in 1948-49
- Date: 19 October 1948 – 3 March 1949
- Location: India
- Result: West Indies won the 5-Test series 1-0
Teams
- India: West Indies
Captains
- Lala Amarnath: John Goddard
Most runs
- Rusi Modi (560) Vijay Hazare (543) Lala Amarnath (294): Everton Weekes (779); Clyde Walcott (452); Allan Rae (374)
Most wickets
- Vinoo Mankad (17) Dattu Phadkar (14) Ghulam Ahmed (8): Prior Jones (17); Gerry Gomez (16); John Trim (10)

The West Indies cricket team toured India, Pakistan and Ceylon from October 1948 to March 1949 and played a five-match Test series against the India national cricket team. West Indies won the Test series 1–0 with four matches being drawn. The West Indians played three matches in Pakistan in November and four matches in Ceylon in February.

== The team ==
- John Goddard (captain)
- Gerry Gomez (vice-captain)
- Denis Atkinson
- Jimmy Cameron
- George Carew
- Robert Christiani
- Wilfred Ferguson
- George Headley
- Prior Jones
- Cliff McWatt
- Allan Rae
- Ken Rickards
- Jeffrey Stollmeyer
- John Trim
- Clyde Walcott
- Everton Weekes

The manager was Donald Lacy, who was the Honorary Secretary and Treasurer of the West Indies Cricket Board of Control.

Frank Worrell was in dispute with the West Indies Cricket Board of Control and was not selected. Hines Johnson, who had led the attack against England in 1947–48, was unavailable for business reasons.

== India ==
=== 1st Test ===
10–14 November 1948
scorecard

West Indies	v	India
631 (183.4 overs); Clyde Walcott 152; C. R. Rangachari 5/107 (29.4 overs)		454 (158.4 overs); Hemu Adhikari 114; Prior Jones 3/90 (28.4 overs)
		220/6 (f/o) (102 overs); Khanmohammad Ibrahim 44; Robert Christiani 3/52 (23 overs)

Match drawn
Feroz Shah Kotla Stadium, Delhi
Umpires: DK Naik, JR Patel

- West Indies won the toss and decided to bat

=== 2nd Test ===
9–13 December 1948
scorecard

West Indies	v	India
629/6 d. (206 overs); Everton Weekes 194; Vinoo Mankad 3/202 (75 overs)		273 (142.2 overs); Dattu Phadkar 74; Wilfred Ferguson 4/126 (57 overs)
		333/3 (132 overs); Vijay Hazare 134*; Prior Jones 1/52 (12 overs)

Match drawn
Brabourne Stadium, Bombay
Umpires: TA Ramachandran, PK Sinha

- West Indies won the toss and decided to bat

=== 3rd Test ===
31 Dec 1948 - 4 Jan 1949
scorecard

West Indies	v	India
366 (115.2 overs); Everton Weekes 162; Ghulam Ahmed 4/94 (35.2 overs)		272 (109 overs); Rusi Modi 80; John Goddard 3/34 (13 overs)
336/9 d. (105.3 overs); Clyde Walcott 108; Vinoo Mankad 3/68 (24.3 overs)		325/3 (136 overs); Mushtaq Ali 106; John Goddard 1/41 (23 overs)

Match drawn
Eden Gardens, Calcutta
Umpires: AR Joshi, BJ Mohoni

- West Indies won the toss and decided to bat

=== 4th Test ===
27–31 January 1949
scorecard

West Indies	v	India
582 (176.3 overs); Jeffrey Stollmeyer 160; Dattu Phadkar 7/159 (45.3 overs)		245 (99 overs); Rusi Modi 56; John Trim 4/48 (27 overs)
		144 (63.3 overs); Vijay Hazare 52; Prior Jones 4/30 (10 overs)

West Indies won by an innings and 193 runs
Madras Cricket Club Ground, Chepauk, Madras
Umpires: AR Joshi, BJ Mohoni

- West Indies won the toss and decided to bat

=== 5th Test ===
4–8 February 1949
scorecard

West Indies	v	India
286 (104.2 overs); Jeffrey Stollmeyer 85; Dattu Phadkar 4/74 (29.2 overs)		193 (88.4 overs); Vijay Hazare 40; John Trim 3/69 (30 overs)
267 (107.3 overs); Allan Rae 97; Shute Banerjee 4/54 (24.3 overs)		355/8 (107 overs); Vijay Hazare 122; Prior Jones 5/85 (41 overs)

Match drawn
Brabourne Stadium, Bombay
Umpires: AR Joshi, BJ Mohoni

- West Indies won the toss and decided to bat

== Pakistan ==
In the first international tour of Pakistan by an overseas team, West Indies played two first-class matches versus Sind at Karachi and a Pakistan XI at Lahore. Both matches were drawn.

=== First Match ===
19–21 November 1948

Sind	v	West Indians
173 (80.0 overs); Peter Fernandes 32; Jimmy Cameron 4/52 (31.0 overs)		283/7 dec. (81.0 overs); George Carew 100; Anwar Hussain 4/66 (25.0 overs)
284/8 dec. (86.1 overs); Anwar Hussain 81; Denis Atkinson 2/38 (13.0 overs)		61/2 (18.0 overs); Jeffrey Stollmeyer 36; Munawwar Ali Khan 1/13 (6.0 overs)

Match drawn
Karachi Gymkhana Ground, Karachi
Umpires: Daud Khan, Naoomal Jaoomal

- Sind won the toss and decided to bat

=== Second Match ===
26–29 November 1948

Pakistan	v	West Indies
241 (129.5 overs); Nazar Mohammad 87; Gerry Gomez 4/51 (31.5 overs)		308 (86.4 overs); Ken Rickards 72; Munawwar Ali Khan 4/103 (21.4 overs)
285/6 dec. (124.4 overs); Imtiaz Ahmed 131; Gerry Gomez 4/70 (47.4 overs)		98/1 (26 overs); George Carew 56; Nazar Mohammad 1/9 (2 overs)

Drawn
Bagh-e-Jinnah, Lahore
Umpires: Daud Khan, Hassan Shah

- Pakistan won the toss and decided to bat

== Ceylon ==
The West Indians visited Ceylon in February and played two first-class matches versus Ceylon. West Indies won the first match at Paikiasothy Saravanamuttu Stadium in Colombo by an innings and 22 runs after scoring 462 for two declared with centuries by Allan Rae, Everton Weekes and Clyde Walcott. Prior Jones took ten wickets in the match. The second match at the same venue was drawn, Rae making another century for West Indies.
