= Stephen Greensword =

English cricketer (born 1943)

Personal information
- Full name: Stephen Greensword
- Born: 6 September 1943 (age 83); Shiney Row, County Durham, England
- Batting: Right-handed
- Bowling: Right-arm medium
- Role: All-rounder

Domestic team information
- Years: Team
- 1973–1992: Minor Counties
- 1973: Minor Counties North
- 1972–1990: Durham
- 1967–1992: Northumberland
- 1963–1966: Leicestershire

Career statistics
Competition	First-class	List A
Matches	43	60
Runs scored	1,094	970
Batting average	16.57	21.55
100s/50s	–/3	–/2
Top score	84*	73
Balls bowled	2,162	3,020
Wickets	29	51
Bowling average	34.55	31.86
5 wickets in innings	–	–
10 wickets in match	–	–
Best bowling	3/22	4/28
Catches/stumpings	30/–	8/–
- Source: Cricinfo, 2 August 2011

Stephen Greensword (born 6 September 1943) is a former English cricketer. Greensword was an all-rounder, a right-handed batsman who bowled right-arm medium pace. He was born in Shiney Row, County Durham.

Greensword made his first-class debut for Leicestershire against Somerset in the 1963 County Championship. He made 38 further first-class appearances for the county, the last of which came against the touring West Indians in 1966. An all-rounder, he scored 887 runs at an average of 14.54, with a high score of 57. This score, one of two fifties he made, came against Lancashire in the 1965 County Championship. With the ball, he took 25 wickets at a bowling average of 33.66, with best figures of 3/22. He made his List A debut against Yorkshire in the 1965 Gillette Cup.

He joined Northumberland in 1967, making his debut in the Minor Counties Championship against Durham. Greensword would play Minor counties cricket for the next 25 years. During this time he played the majority of his Minor counties cricket for Durham, who he first played for in 1970, but also had brief spells during this time with Northumberland. He finished his Minor counties career with Northumberland in the 1992 season. During this period he made 206 Minor Counties Championship appearances and 19 MCCA Knockout Trophy appearances.

He made 20 List A appearances for Durham, scoring 392 runs at an average of 21.77, with a high score of 73. This score, one of two fifties he scored for Durham, came against Surrey in the 1982 NatWest Trophy. With the ball, he took 19 wickets for Durham at an average of 28.84, with best figures of 4/28. He also made 3 List A appearances for Northumberland during this period, scoring 43 runs and taking 3 wickets at an average of 16.33. He played for Durham when they became the first minor county to defeat one of the senior counties in the Gillette Cup, taking 2 for 29 off 12 overs and making 35 not out when Durham beat Yorkshire by five wickets in 1973.

Playing for Durham and Northumberland allowed him to represent a Minor Counties team of one form or another. He made his first appearance for Minor Counties North in a List A match in the 1973 Benson & Hedges Cup against Yorkshire, a match in which he scored 20 runs before being dismissed by Michael Bore and bowled 7 wicket-less overs. He later made his first appearance for the Minor Counties cricket team against Essex in the 1980 Benson & Hedges Cup. He would go on to make a further 34 List A appearances for the team, the last of which came against Leicestershire in the 1992 Benson & Hedges Cup. In his 35 matches for the team, he scored 513 runs at an average of 22.30, with a high score of 46. With the ball, he took 28 wickets at an average of 34.10, with best figures of 3/38. He also appeared in first-class cricket for the Minor Counties, first playing for them in the 1973 against the touring West Indians. He made 3 further first-class appearances for the team, the last of which came against the touring Indians in 1990. In his 4 matches for the team, he scored 207 runs at an average of 41.40, in the course of which he made his highest first-class score of 84 not out, which came against the West Indians in 1973. With the ball, he took 5 wickets at an average of 38.80, with best figures of 2/58.

Greensword scored 23,000 runs in the Durham Senior league at an average of 55, including 36 hundreds – topping the batting averages eight times, and eight times making a thousand runs – and took 1,400 wickets, with 35 per cent of his 10,000 overs being maidens. He retired from the league at the age of 51.
