= England cricket team Test results (1975–1989) =

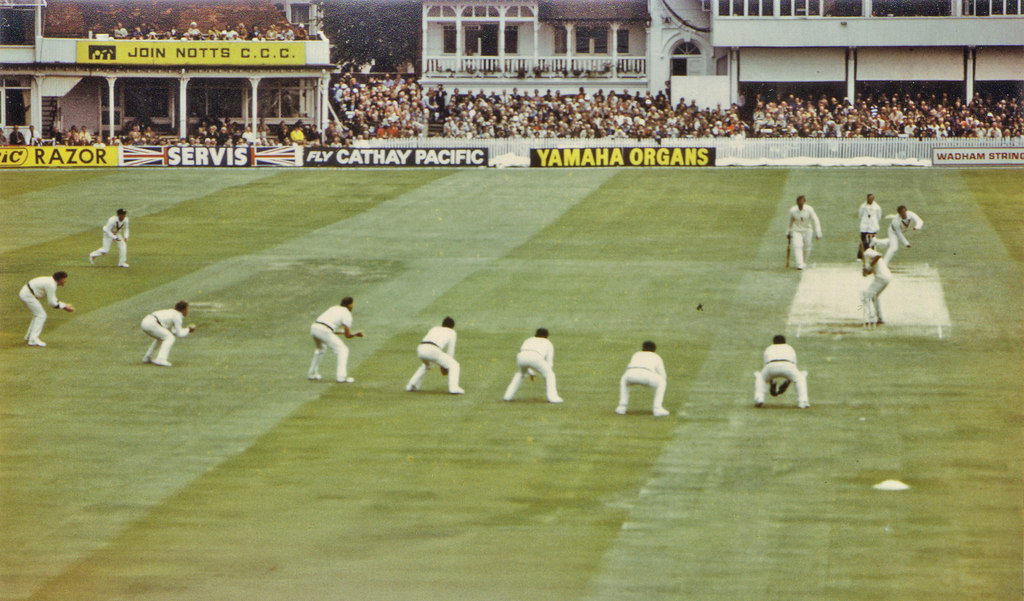
David Gower and Ian Botham, pictured batting against Australia at Trent Bridge in 1981, were England's leading run-scorers in Test cricket between 1975 and 1989.

Between 1975 and 1989 the England cricket team represented England, Scotland and Wales in Test cricket. (Note: The England cricket team represented Scotland until 1992, when they left the UK Cricket Council and later joined the International Cricket Council (ICC) as an independent member.) During that time England played 152 Test matches, resulting in 40 victories, 62 draws and 50 defeats. They faced Sri Lanka for the first time in Test cricket when England toured the country in 1981–82. England did not face South Africa during this period, due to the sporting boycott of South Africa during the apartheid era. The West Indies were the most successful team in Test cricket at the time, and were described as "the undisputed champions" by Tony Becca of Cricinfo; England faced them in 29 Test matches, and did not beat them. England, like many other Test teams, lost some of their best players to World Series Cricket, an unsanctioned competition organised by Kerry Packer. Among those players who signed up for the league, and were subsequently banned from Test cricket, was England's captain, Tony Greig.

England faced Australia most frequently during this period—playing 52 matches against them—followed by the West Indies. England won more matches than they lost against Australia, India, New Zealand and Sri Lanka. Against Pakistan they won four and lost four, while against the West Indies they lost 20 of their 29 fixtures. England won 11 matches by an innings, with their largest victory being by an innings and 120 runs against Pakistan in 1978. Their largest victory by runs alone during this period was in the 1978–79 Ashes series, when they beat Australia by 205 runs in the fifth Test, while they won by ten wickets twice. Conversely, England suffered their second-largest ever defeat by runs alone, losing to the West Indies by 425 runs during their visit in 1976.

== Key ==
Key
Symbol	Meaning
No. (Eng.)	Match number for England (i.e. 500 was England's 500th Test match)
No. (Ove.)	Match number overall (i.e. 500 was the 500th Test match)
Opposition	The team England were playing against
Venue	The cricket ground where the match was played
H/A	Whether the venue is home (England or Wales) or away (opponent's home)
Start date	Starting date of the Test match
Result	Result of the match for England
Series (result)	What series the match was part of, with the result listed in brackets; England's tally first (i.e. (2–1) means that England won two matches, and their opponents won one match)

== Matches ==
England Test cricket results between 1975 and 1989
No. (Eng.)	No. (Ove.)	Opposition	Venue	H/A	Start date	Result	Series (result)
506	751	Australia	Sydney Cricket Ground, Sydney	Away	4 January 1975	Lost by 171 runs	1974–75 Ashes series (1–4) (Note: The 1974–75 Ashes series began in 1974; the first three results are listed at England cricket team Test results (1960–1974).)
507	754	Australia	Adelaide Oval, Adelaide	Away	25 January 1975	Lost by 163 runs	1974–75 Ashes series (1–4)
508	755	Australia	Melbourne Cricket Ground, Melbourne	Away	8 February 1975	Won by an innings and 4 runs	1974–75 Ashes series (1–4)
509	757	New Zealand	Eden Park, Auckland	Away	20 February 1975	Won by an innings and 83 runs	England in New Zealand, 1974–75 (1–0)
510	758	New Zealand	Lancaster Park, Christchurch	Away	28 February 1975	Match drawn	England in New Zealand, 1974–75 (1–0)
511	760	Australia	Edgbaston, Birmingham	Home	10 July 1975	Lost by an innings and 85 runs	1975 Ashes series (0–1)
512	761	Australia	Lord's, London	Home	31 July 1975	Match drawn	1975 Ashes series (0–1)
513	762	Australia	Headingley, Leeds	Home	14 August 1975	Match drawn	1975 Ashes series (0–1)
514	763	Australia	The Oval, London	Home	28 August 1975	Match drawn	1975 Ashes series (0–1)
515	777	West Indies	Trent Bridge, Nottingham	Home	3 June 1976	Match drawn	West Indies in England, 1976 (0–3)
516	778	West Indies	Lord's, London	Home	17 June 1976	Match drawn	West Indies in England, 1976 (0–3)
517	779	West Indies	Old Trafford, Manchester	Home	8 July 1976	Lost by 425 runs	West Indies in England, 1976 (0–3)
518	780	West Indies	Headingley, Leeds	Home	22 July 1976	Lost by 55 runs	West Indies in England, 1976 (0–3)
519	781	West Indies	The Oval, London	Home	12 August 1976	Lost by 231 runs	West Indies in England, 1976 (0–3)
520	788	India	Feroz Shah Kotla Ground, Delhi	Away	17 December 1976	Won by an innings and 25 runs	England in India, 1976–77 (3–1)
521	791	India	Eden Gardens, Calcutta	Away	1 January 1977	Won by 10 wickets	England in India, 1976–77 (3–1)
522	793	India	Madras Cricket Club Ground, (Note: The Madras Cricket Club Ground was renamed the M. A. Chidambaram Stadium in 1980.) Madras	Away	14 January 1977	Won by 200 runs	England in India, 1976–77 (3–1)
523	794	India	M. Chinnaswamy Stadium, Bangalore	Away	28 January 1977	Lost by 140 runs	England in India, 1976–77 (3–1)
524	795	India	Wankhede Stadium, Bombay	Away	11 February 1977	Match drawn	England in India, 1976–77 (3–1)
525	800	Australia	Melbourne Cricket Ground, Melbourne	Away	12 March 1977	Lost by 45 runs	Centenary Test (0–1)
526	804	Australia	Lord's, London	Home	16 June 1977	Match drawn	1977 Ashes series (3–0)
527	805	Australia	Old Trafford, Manchester	Home	7 July 1977	Won by 9 wickets	1977 Ashes series (3–0)
528	806	Australia	Trent Bridge, Nottingham	Home	28 July 1977	Won by 7 wickets	1977 Ashes series (3–0)
529	807	Australia	Headingley, Leeds	Home	11 August 1977	Won by an innings and 85 runs	1977 Ashes series (3–0)
530	808	Australia	The Oval, London	Home	25 August 1977	Match drawn	1977 Ashes series (3–0)
531	810	Pakistan	Gaddafi Stadium, Lahore	Away	14 December 1977	Match drawn	England in Pakistan, 1977–78 (0–0)
532	813	Pakistan	Niaz Stadium, Hyderabad	Away	2 January 1978	Match drawn	England in Pakistan, 1977–78 (0–0)
533	815	Pakistan	National Stadium, Karachi	Away	18 January 1978	Match drawn	England in Pakistan, 1977–78 (0–0)
534	817	New Zealand	Basin Reserve, Wellington	Away	10 February 1978	Lost by 72 runs	England in New Zealand, 1977–78 (1–1)
535	818	New Zealand	Lancaster Park, Christchurch	Away	24 February 1978	Won by 174 runs	England in New Zealand, 1977–78 (1–1)
536	820	New Zealand	Eden Park, Auckland	Away	4 March 1978	Match drawn	England in New Zealand, 1977–78 (1–1)
537	825	Pakistan	Edgbaston, Birmingham	Home	1 June 1978	Won by an innings and 57 runs	Pakistan in England, 1978 (2–0)
538	826	Pakistan	Lord's, London	Home	15 June 1978	Won by an innings and 120 runs	Pakistan in England, 1978 (2–0)
539	827	Pakistan	Headingley, Leeds	Home	29 June 1978	Match drawn	Pakistan in England, 1978 (2–0)
540	828	New Zealand	The Oval, London	Home	27 July 1978	Won by 7 wickets	New Zealand in England, 1978 (3–0)
541	829	New Zealand	Trent Bridge, Nottingham	Home	10 August 1978	Won by an innings and 119 runs	New Zealand in England, 1978 (3–0)
542	830	New Zealand	Lord's, London	Home	24 August 1978	Won by 7 wickets	New Zealand in England, 1978 (3–0)
543	834	Australia	The Gabba, Brisbane	Away	1 December 1978	Won by 7 wickets	1978–79 Ashes series (5–1)
544	836	Australia	WACA Ground, Perth	Away	15 December 1978	Won by 166 runs	1978–79 Ashes series (5–1)
545	838	Australia	Melbourne Cricket Ground, Melbourne	Away	29 December 1978	Lost by 103 runs	1978–79 Ashes series (5–1)
546	840	Australia	Sydney Cricket Ground, Sydney	Away	6 January 1979	Won by 93 runs	1978–79 Ashes series (5–1)
547	843	Australia	Adelaide Oval, Adelaide	Away	27 January 1979	Won by 205 runs	1978–79 Ashes series (5–1)
548	846	Australia	Sydney Cricket Ground, Sydney	Away	10 February 1979	Won by 9 wickets	1978–79 Ashes series (5–1)
549	851	India	Edgbaston, Birmingham	Home	12 July 1979	Won by an innings and 83 runs	India in England, 1979 (1–0)
550	852	India	Lord's, London	Home	2 August 1979	Match drawn	India in England, 1979 (1–0)
551	853	India	Headingley, Leeds	Home	16 August 1979	Match drawn	India in England, 1979 (1–0)
552	854	India	The Oval, London	Home	30 August 1979	Match drawn	India in England, 1979 (1–0)
553	864	Australia	WACA Ground, Perth	Away	14 December 1979	Lost by 138 runs	England in Australia, 1979–80 (0–3)
554	868	Australia	Sydney Cricket Ground, Sydney	Away	4 January 1980	Lost by 6 wickets	England in Australia, 1979–80 (0–3)
555	872	Australia	Melbourne Cricket Ground, Melbourne	Away	1 February 1980	Lost by 8 wickets	England in Australia, 1979–80 (0–3)
556	874	India	Wankhede Stadium, Bombay	Away	15 February 1980	Won by 10 wickets	Golden Jubilee Test (1–0)
557	880	West Indies	Trent Bridge, Nottingham	Home	5 June 1980	Lost by 2 wickets	West Indies in England, 1980 (0–1)
558	881	West Indies	Lord's, London	Home	19 June 1980	Match drawn	West Indies in England, 1980 (0–1)
559	882	West Indies	Old Trafford, Manchester	Home	10 July 1980	Match drawn	West Indies in England, 1980 (0–1)
560	883	West Indies	The Oval, London	Home	24 July 1980	Match drawn	West Indies in England, 1980 (0–1)
561	884	West Indies	Headingley, Leeds	Home	7 August 1980	Match drawn	West Indies in England, 1980 (0–1)
562	885	Australia	Lord's, London	Home	28 August 1980	Match drawn	Centenary Test (0–0)
563	896	West Indies	Queen's Park Oval, Port of Spain	Away	13 February 1981	Lost by an innings and 79 runs	England in the West Indies, 1980–81 (0–2)
564	900	West Indies	Kensington Oval, Bridgetown	Away	13 March 1981	Lost by 298 runs	England in the West Indies, 1980–81 (0–2)
565	901	West Indies	Antigua Recreation Ground, St John's	Away	27 March 1981	Match drawn	England in the West Indies, 1980–81 (0–2)
566	902	West Indies	Sabina Park, Kingston	Away	10 April 1981	Match drawn	England in the West Indies, 1980–81 (0–2)
567	903	Australia	Trent Bridge, Nottingham	Home	18 June 1981	Lost by 4 wickets	1981 Ashes series (3–1)
568	904	Australia	Lord's, London	Home	2 July 1981	Match drawn	1981 Ashes series (3–1)
569	905	Australia	Headingley, Leeds	Home	16 July 1981	Won by 18 runs	1981 Ashes series (3–1)
570	906	Australia	Edgbaston, Birmingham	Home	30 July 1981	Won by 29 runs	1981 Ashes series (3–1)
571	907	Australia	Old Trafford, Manchester	Home	13 August 1981	Won by 103 runs	1981 Ashes series (3–1)
572	908	Australia	The Oval, London	Home	27 August 1981	Match drawn	1981 Ashes series (3–1)
573	911	India	Wankhede Stadium, Bombay	Away	27 November 1981	Lost by 138 runs	England in India, 1981–82 (0–1)
574	912	India	M. Chinnaswamy Stadium, Bangalore	Away	9 December 1981	Match drawn	England in India, 1981–82 (0–1)
575	914	India	Feroz Shah Kotla Ground, Delhi	Away	23 December 1981	Match drawn	England in India, 1981–82 (0–1)
576	916	India	Eden Gardens, Calcutta	Away	1 January 1982	Match drawn	England in India, 1981–82 (0–1)
577	918	India	M. A. Chidambaram Stadium, Madras	Away	13 January 1982	Match drawn	England in India, 1981–82 (0–1)
578	920	India	Green Park Stadium, Kanpur	Away	30 January 1982	Match drawn	England in India, 1981–82 (0–1)
579	921	Sri Lanka	Paikiasothy Saravanamuttu Stadium, Colombo	Away	17 February 1982	Won by 7 wickets	England in Sri Lanka, 1981–82 (1–0)
580	928	India	Lord's, London	Home	10 June 1982	Won by 7 wickets	India in England, 1982 (1–0)
581	929	India	Old Trafford, Manchester	Home	24 June 1982	Match drawn	India in England, 1982 (1–0)
582	930	India	The Oval, London	Home	8 July 1982	Match drawn	India in England, 1982 (1–0)
583	931	Pakistan	Edgbaston, Birmingham	Home	29 July 1982	Won by 113 runs	Pakistan in England, 1982 (2–1)
584	932	Pakistan	Lord's, London	Home	12 August 1982	Lost by 10 wickets	Pakistan in England, 1982 (2–1)
585	933	Pakistan	Headingley, Leeds	Home	26 August 1982	Won by 3 wickets	Pakistan in England, 1982 (2–1)
586	938	Australia	WACA Ground, Perth	Away	12 November 1982	Match drawn	1982–83 Ashes series (1–2)
587	939	Australia	The Gabba, Brisbane	Away	26 November 1982	Lost by 7 wickets	1982–83 Ashes series (1–2)
588	940	Australia	Adelaide Oval, Adelaide	Away	10 December 1982	Lost by 8 wickets	1982–83 Ashes series (1–2)
589	943	Australia	Melbourne Cricket Ground, Melbourne	Away	26 December 1982	Won by 3 runs	1982–83 Ashes series (1–2)
590	944	Australia	Sydney Cricket Ground, Sydney	Away	2 January 1983	Match drawn	1982–83 Ashes series (1–2)
591	957	New Zealand	The Oval, London	Home	14 July 1983	Won by 189 runs	New Zealand in England, 1983 (3–1)
592	958	New Zealand	Headingley, Leeds	Home	28 July 1983	Lost by 5 wickets	New Zealand in England, 1983 (3–1)
593	959	New Zealand	Lord's, London	Home	11 August 1983	Won by 127 runs	New Zealand in England, 1983 (3–1)
594	960	New Zealand	Trent Bridge, Nottingham	Home	25 August 1983	Won by 165 runs	New Zealand in England, 1983 (3–1)
595	975	New Zealand	Basin Reserve, Wellington	Away	20 January 1984	Match drawn	England in New Zealand, 1983–84 (0–1)
596	976	New Zealand	Lancaster Park, Christchurch	Away	3 February 1984	Lost by an innings and 132 runs	England in New Zealand, 1983–84 (0–1)
597	977	New Zealand	Eden Park, Auckland	Away	10 February 1984	Match drawn	England in New Zealand, 1983–84 (0–1)
598	978	Pakistan	National Stadium, Karachi	Away	2 March 1984	Lost by 3 wickets	England in Pakistan, 1983–84 (0–1)
599	981	Pakistan	Iqbal Stadium, Faisalabad	Away	12 March 1984	Match drawn	England in Pakistan, 1983–84 (0–1)
600	984	Pakistan	Gaddafi Stadium, Lahore	Away	19 March 1984	Match drawn	England in Pakistan, 1983–84 (0–1)
601	989	West Indies	Edgbaston, Birmingham	Home	14 June 1984	Lost by an innings and 180 runs	West Indies in England, 1984 (0–5)
602	990	West Indies	Lord's, London	Home	28 June 1984	Lost by 9 wickets	West Indies in England, 1984 (0–5)
603	991	West Indies	Headingley, Leeds	Home	12 July 1984	Lost by 8 wickets	West Indies in England, 1984 (0–5)
604	992	West Indies	Old Trafford, Manchester	Home	26 July 1984	Lost by an innings and 64 runs	West Indies in England, 1984 (0–5)
605	993	West Indies	The Oval, London	Home	9 August 1984	Lost by 172 runs	West Indies in England, 1984 (0–5)
606	994	Sri Lanka	Lord's, London	Home	23 August 1984	Match drawn	Sri Lanka in England, 1984 (0–0)
607	1001	India	Wankhede Stadium, Bombay	Away	28 November 1984	Lost by 8 wickets	England in India, 1984–85 (2–1)
608	1004	India	Feroz Shah Kotla Ground, Delhi	Away	12 December 1984	Won by 8 wickets	England in India, 1984–85 (2–1)
609	1007	India	Eden Gardens, Calcutta	Away	31 December 1984	Match drawn	England in India, 1984–85 (2–1)
610	1008	India	M. A. Chidambaram Stadium, Madras	Away	13 January 1985	Won by 9 wickets	England in India, 1984–85 (2–1)
611	1011	India	Green Park Stadium, Kanpur	Away	31 January 1985	Match drawn	England in India, 1984–85 (2–1)
612	1017	Australia	Headingley, Leeds	Home	13 June 1985	Won by 5 wickets	1985 Ashes series (3–1)
613	1018	Australia	Lord's, London	Home	27 June 1985	Lost by 4 wickets	1985 Ashes series (3–1)
614	1019	Australia	Trent Bridge, Nottingham	Home	11 July 1985	Match drawn	1985 Ashes series (3–1)
615	1020	Australia	Old Trafford, Manchester	Home	1 August 1985	Match drawn	1985 Ashes series (3–1)
616	1021	Australia	Edgbaston, Birmingham	Home	15 August 1985	Won by an innings and 118 runs	1985 Ashes series (3–1)
617	1022	Australia	The Oval, London	Home	29 August 1985	Won by an innings and 94 runs	1985 Ashes series (3–1)
618	1036	West Indies	Sabina Park, Kingston	Away	21 February 1986	Lost by 10 wickets	England in the West Indies, 1985–86 (0–5)
619	1039	West Indies	Queen's Park Oval, Port of Spain	Away	7 March 1986	Lost by 7 wickets	England in the West Indies, 1985–86 (0–5)
620	1042	West Indies	Kensington Oval, Bridgetown	Away	21 March 1986	Lost by an innings and 30 runs	England in the West Indies, 1985–86 (0–5)
621	1044	West Indies	Queen's Park Oval, Port of Spain	Away	3 April 1986	Lost by 10 wickets	England in the West Indies, 1985–86 (0–5)
622	1045	West Indies	Antigua Recreation Ground, St John's	Away	11 April 1986	Lost by 240 runs	England in the West Indies, 1985–86 (0–5)
623	1046	India	Lord's, London	Home	5 June 1986	Lost by 5 wickets	India in England, 1986 (0–2)
624	1047	India	Headingley, Leeds	Home	19 June 1986	Lost by 279 runs	India in England, 1986 (0–2)
625	1048	India	Edgbaston, Birmingham	Home	3 July 1986	Match drawn	India in England, 1986 (0–2)
626	1049	New Zealand	Lord's, London	Home	24 July 1986	Match drawn	New Zealand in England, 1986 (0–1)
627	1050	New Zealand	Trent Bridge, Nottingham	Home	7 August 1986	Lost by 8 wickets	New Zealand in England, 1986 (0–1)
628	1051	New Zealand	The Oval, London	Home	21 August 1986	Match drawn	New Zealand in England, 1986 (0–1)
629	1057	Australia	The Gabba, Brisbane	Away	14 November 1986	Won by 7 wickets	1986–87 Ashes series (2–1)
630	1059	Australia	WACA Ground, Perth	Away	28 November 1986	Match drawn	1986–87 Ashes series (2–1)
631	1060	Australia	Adelaide Oval, Adelaide	Away	12 December 1986	Match drawn	1986–87 Ashes series (2–1)
632	1062	Australia	Melbourne Cricket Ground, Melbourne	Away	26 December 1986	Won by an innings and 14 runs	1986–87 Ashes series (2–1)
633	1065	Australia	Sydney Cricket Ground, Sydney	Away	10 January 1987	Lost by 55 runs	1986–87 Ashes series (2–1)
634	1075	Pakistan	Old Trafford, Manchester	Home	4 June 1987	Match drawn	Pakistan in England, 1987 (0–1)
635	1076	Pakistan	Lord's, London	Home	18 June 1987	Match drawn	Pakistan in England, 1987 (0–1)
636	1077	Pakistan	Headingley, Leeds	Home	2 July 1987	Lost by an innings and 18 runs	Pakistan in England, 1987 (0–1)
637	1078	Pakistan	Edgbaston, Birmingham	Home	23 July 1987	Match drawn	Pakistan in England, 1987 (0–1)
638	1079	Pakistan	The Oval, London	Home	6 August 1987	Match drawn	Pakistan in England, 1987 (0–1)
639	1081	Pakistan	Gaddafi Stadium, Lahore	Away	25 November 1987	Lost by an innings and 87 runs	England in Pakistan, 1987–88 (0–1)
640	1083	Pakistan	Iqbal Stadium, Faisalabad	Away	7 December 1987	Match drawn	England in Pakistan, 1987–88 (0–1)
641	1086	Pakistan	National Stadium, Karachi	Away	16 December 1987	Match drawn	England in Pakistan, 1987–88 (0–1)
642	1090	Australia	Sydney Cricket Ground, Sydney	Away	29 January 1988	Match drawn	Bicentenary Test (0–0)
643	1091	New Zealand	Lancaster Park, Christchurch	Away	12 February 1988	Match drawn	England in New Zealand, 1987–88 (0–0)
644	1093	New Zealand	Eden Park, Auckland	Away	25 February 1988	Match drawn	England in New Zealand, 1987–88 (0–0)
645	1094	New Zealand	Basin Reserve, Wellington	Away	3 March 1988	Match drawn	England in New Zealand, 1987–88 (0–0)
646	1098	West Indies	Trent Bridge, Nottingham	Home	2 June 1988	Match drawn	West Indies in England, 1988 (0–4)
647	1099	West Indies	Lord's, London	Home	16 June 1988	Lost by 134 runs	West Indies in England, 1988 (0–4)
648	1100	West Indies	Old Trafford, Manchester	Home	30 June 1988	Lost by an innings and 156 runs	West Indies in England, 1988 (0–4)
649	1101	West Indies	Headingley, Leeds	Home	21 July 1988	Lost by 10 wickets	West Indies in England, 1988 (0–4)
650	1102	West Indies	The Oval, London	Home	4 August 1988	Lost by 8 wickets	West Indies in England, 1988 (0–4)
651	1103	Sri Lanka	Lord's, London	Home	25 August 1988	Won by 7 wickets	Sri Lanka in England, 1988 (1–0)
652	1121	Australia	Headingley, Leeds	Home	8 June 1989	Lost by 210 runs	1989 Ashes series (0–4)
653	1122	Australia	Lord's, London	Home	22 June 1989	Lost by 6 wickets	1989 Ashes series (0–4)
654	1123	Australia	Edgbaston, Birmingham	Home	6 July 1989	Match drawn	1989 Ashes series (0–4)
655	1124	Australia	Old Trafford, Manchester	Home	27 July 1989	Lost by 9 wickets	1989 Ashes series (0–4)
656	1125	Australia	Trent Bridge, Nottingham	Home	10 August 1989	Lost by an innings and 180 runs	1989 Ashes series (0–4)
657	1126	Australia	The Oval, London	Home	24 August 1989	Match drawn	1989 Ashes series (0–4)

== Summary ==
Team	Total matches					Home matches					Away matches				
Team	Mat	Won	Lost	Draw	W/L	Mat	Won	Lost	Draw	W/L	Mat	Won	Lost	Draw	W/L
Australia	52	18	17	17	1.058	28	9	7	12	1.285	24	9	10	5	0.900
India	27	8	5	14	1.600	10	2	2	6	1.000	17	6	3	8	2.000
New Zealand	21	8	4	9	2.000	10	6	2	2	3.000	11	2	2	7	1.000
Pakistan	20	4	4	12	1.000	11	4	2	5	2.000	9	0	2	7	0.000
Sri Lanka	3	2	0	1	–	2	1	0	1	–	1	1	0	0	–
West Indies	29	0	20	9	0.000	20	0	13	7	0.000	9	0	7	2	0.000
Total	152	40	50	62	0.800	81	22	26	33	0.846	71	18	24	29	0.750
