= Colin Ingleby-Mackenzie =

English cricketer (1933–2006)

Colin Ingleby-Mackenzie OBE
Personal information
- Full name: Alexander Colin David Ingleby-Mackenzie
- Born: 15 September 1933; Dartmouth, Devon, England
- Died: 9 March 2006 (aged 72); London, England
- Nickname: McCrackers
- Batting: Left-handed
- Bowling: Right-arm off break

Domestic team information
- Years: Team
- 1951–1966: Hampshire
- 1956–1962: Marylebone Cricket Club

Career statistics
Competition	First-class	List A
Matches	343	9
Runs scored	12,421	190
Batting average	24.35	27.14
100s/50s	11/55	0/1
Top score	132*	59*
Catches/stumpings	205/1	7/2
- Source: Cricinfo, 25 August 2009

Alexander Colin David Ingleby-Mackenzie OBE (15 September 1933 – 9 March 2006) was an English cricketer, cricket administrator, and businessman. Ingleby-Mackenzie played first-class cricket for Hampshire between 1951 and 1966, serving as Hampshire's last amateur captain. Through bold captaincy, he led Hampshire to their first County Championship title in 1961. An attacking batsman, he scored over 12,000 runs in first-class cricket. Following the end of his playing career, and a period working in the insurance industry, Ingleby-Mackenzie assumed the presidency of the Marylebone Cricket Club (MCC) between 1996 and 1998. Under his tenure, the MCC underwent an important social reform when its members voted to allow for the admission of female members. He later served as president of Hampshire between 2002 and his death, in March 2006.

== Early life ==
The only son of Surgeon Vice-Admiral Sir Alexander Ingleby-Mackenzie and Violetta Longstaffe, Colin Ingleby-Mackenzie was born in Dartmouth on 15 September 1933. He was educated firstly at Ludgrove School, where the ex-Yorkshire cricketer Alan Barber was headmaster, before attending Eton College. There he became keeper of fives, squash, rackets, and the Field Game. He additionally played in the Wall Game, football, tennis, and cricket, playing three times in the annual Eton v Harrow cricket match. He was also elected President of Pop at Eton. It was at the age of 12, whilst batting in the nets, that he was first spotted by Harry Altham. As a 16-year-old playing for Hampshire's Second XI, he did enough to convince Hampshire captain and secretary Desmond Eagar that he was future captaincy material himself.

A year later, in September 1951, he made his debut in first-class cricket for Hampshire against Sussex at Bournemouth in the County Championship, but was dismissed without scoring by Alan Oakman in his debut innings. The following season, he made six first-class appearances for Hampshire, playing five County Championship matches, and once against the touring Indians. After completing his education at Eton, Ingleby-Mackenzie gained a place at Trinity College, Oxford, but chose not to matriculate. Instead, he undertook National Service in 1952 and 1953 with the Royal Navy as a midshipman, that entitled him to play for the Combined Services cricket team in two first-class matches against Warwickshire and the touring Australians, scoring 66 runs in the Combined Services second innings in the latter fixture. Due to his National Service commitments, he did not play for Hampshire in 1953.

== Career with Hampshire ==
=== Early years ===
After completing his National Service, Ingleby-Mackenzie gained employment with Slazenger in Yorkshire, who provided him with copious leave to pursue a parallel cricket career with Hampshire. He established himself in the Hampshire side as a middle order batsman in the 1954 season, making 29 first-class appearances, scoring 821 runs at an average of 17.84. He made four half centuries during his first full season, with a highest score of 85 runs. In 1955, he played only two first-class matches, playing one match apiece for Hampshire against Warwickshire, and for the Free Foresters against Oxford University. Following the 1955 season, he was selected to tour the West Indies with E. W. Swanton's personal team. The tour took place in March and April 1956, with Ingleby-Mackenzie playing two first-class matches against Trinidad and a West Indies XI.

He featured more regularly for Hampshire in 1956, making eleven appearances, alongside playing twice for the Free Foresters and once for the Marylebone Cricket Club (MCC) against Hampshire. It was during this season that he began to score runs and impress the more senior players at Hampshire. He made a maiden first-class century with an unbeaten 124 runs against Oxford University, in what was his first match of the season for Hampshire. He followed this up with an unbeaten 130 runs against Worcestershire at Cowes. He ended the season with 696 runs at an average of 34.80. Following the season, he toured Jamaica with a team led by the Duke of Norfolk. There, he played two first-class matches against Jamaica. During the 1957 season, he fully established himself in the Hampshire side, making 29 first-class appearances. In these, he scored a thousand runs in a season for the first time, with 1,230 at an average of 27.33. When Eagar had need to stand aside from the captaincy for certain matches in 1956 and 1957, he let Ingleby-Mackenzie deputise. He gained his cap in 1957, after making 88 runs against Kent.

=== Hampshire captaincy ===
Eagar retired after the 1957 season, with him subsequently appointing Ingleby-Mackenzie to replace him in the captaincy. In his first season as captain, he led Hampshire to second-place in the County Championship, their highest ever finish. During the season he scored 1,188 runs at an average of 25.82, making two centuries. In the same year, he was named as the Cricket Writers' Club Young Cricketer of the Year. His century against Somerset at Bournemouth, that he made in 61 minutes, was the fastest century of the season. His performances that season saw him selected to play for the Gentlemen in the Gentlemen v Players match at Lord's, but he did little of note. At the end of the season he played for both the South, in the North v South fixture, and for the MCC at the Scarborough Festival. Wisden reviewed his first season of captaincy by referring to his "spirit of enterprise and insistence on all-out attack". 1958 also coincided with a change of professional career for Ingleby-Mackenzie, with him being co-opted by the Kent cricketer Bryan Valentine into the insurance brokers Holmwoods, Back and Manson. Hampshire dropped down the table over the next two seasons, finishing eighth in the 1959 County Championship and twelfth in the 1960 County Championship, with his dedication to the cause being questioned as his injuries seemed to coincide with fashionable race meetings, such as Ascot. Nevertheless, he made 35 first-class appearances in 1959, scoring 1,608 runs and in 1960, he fell just two runs short of a thousand runs for the season.

Following the 1960 season, he captained E. W. Swanton's personal team on a tour to the West Indies, where he made four first-class appearances. In 1961, he guided Hampshire to their first County Championship title. Their triumph was, in part, due to Ingleby-Mackenzie's bold captaincy: 10 of their 19 victories that season were attributable to bold declarations on the third (and last) day, in a summer when the opposing team could not be made to follow-on. His mode of captaincy encapsulated his motto upon being appointed in 1958: "Win or lose, let's entertain or perish." With the likes of West Indian opening batsman Roy Marshall and the pace bowlers Derek Shackleton and Butch White, he possessed a team that could back up his risk-taking captaincy. He was ably assisted by Leo Harrison, who he would often confide in for advice. His own personal contribution with the bat to Hampshire's triumph was 1,321 runs at an average of 28.10, from 31 first-class matches. His only century in 1961 was arguably his most important innings for Hampshire, when he made an unbeaten 132 against Essex in 140 minutes at Cowes, to help secure a vital victory, after Hampshire had been 35 for 4 chasing 240 runs. When asked how Hampshire had achieved their Championship success, Ingleby-Mackenzie answered "wine, women and song" and "well, everyone in bed in time for breakfast, I suppose".

Hampshire were unable to repeat their success in the 1962 County Championship, finishing tenth. He again passed a thousand runs for the season, for the fifth and last time, scoring 1,077 at an average of 22.43, with one century. He wrote his autobiography, Many a Slip, in 1962. John Arlott said the book "reflects a considerable capacity for the enjoyment of most pleasures... [and] presents a picture of a young man engagingly carefree in a way that seems to belong to a different age from ours". Following the 1962 season, he toured Africa and Malaya with a Commonwealth XI, playing in one first-class match against Rhodesia. He led Hampshire to a tenth placed finish in the 1963 County Championship, though he played in only nineteen first-class matches during the season. His absence was caused by an illness he had picked up in Australia during the winter, but had not fully recovered from, necessitating rest and recuperation in August. Earlier in the season, he had the distinction of captaining Hampshire in their inaugural List A one-day match against Derbyshire in the Gillette Cup, with Ingleby-Mackenzie keeping wicket in place of regular wicket-keeper Brian Timms.

Having recovered from his illness, he toured Jamaica with the International Cavaliers in January 1964, who were captained by Denis Compton. In March, he proceeded to tour India and Thailand with E. W. Swanton's team, where he captained a team that contained many of the leading Test cricketers of the time, such as Richie Benaud and Garfield Sobers. He captained Hampshire to twelfth-place in both the 1964 County Championship and the 1965 County Championship. In the 1965 Gillette Cup, he led Hampshire to the quarter-finals. Prior to the 1965 season, he had toured Barbados with the International Cavaliers, captained by Trevor Bailey. Ingleby-Mackenzie retired, aged just 31, following the 1965 season; the last amateur to captain Hampshire, he passed the captaincy onto the professional Roy Marshall. Despite retiring, he returned to play three one-day matches in the 1966 Gillette Cup against Kent, Surrey, and Worcestershire. Against Kent, he made an unbeaten 59 to help Hampshire to victory, and earn him the Man of the Match award.

=== Playing style and statistics ===
In his first-class career, Ingleby-Mackenzie scored 12,421 first-class runs from 343 first-class matches, including eleven hundreds, at a relatively low batting average of 24.35, this figure was depressed at least in part because of his attacking instincts: in only one season (1956) when he played more than a handful of games did he average above 30. The Times described his batting as being conducted in a "breezy" and "independent" manner, befitting of an amateur. His youthful and carefree style of captaincy, where risks were taken in the pursuit of victory, drew comparisons to Lionel Tennyson's captaincy some thirty years previous.

== Business and cricket administration ==
Ingleby-Mackenzie later became chairman of Holmwoods, having been managing director of its schools' insurance branch. He led the firm through a £33 million management buyout from Brown Shipley in 1992, becoming head of its insurance division. He oversaw the sale of the business to HSBC in 1997, where he became deputy chairman of HSBC Insurance Services.

In May 1996, he succeeded Sir Oliver Popplewell as president of the MCC. During this two-year tenure as president, he oversaw the approval and initial stages of construction of the futuristic media centre. As president, he initiated reforms to allow women to be elected MCC members, seeking to rid the club of "a fuddy-duddy image of old men puffing on pipes". His first attempt to allow the admission of female members was not successful, as his proposal failed to receive the two-thirds majority required from members to pass. In September 1998, just days before he handed the presidency over to his successor Tony Lewis, MCC members voted to allow the admission of female members, with him having forced two votes on the matter within seven months. He pronounced himself "absolutely delighted" at the decision.

He became cricket manager for his friend Sir Paul Getty at his ground at Wormsley, where he was responsible for arranging fixtures, raising teams, and leading tours. Ingleby-Mackenzie was elected president of Hampshire in 2002, having previously advised Hampshire chairman Rod Bransgrove in a consultancy role. Following his death, he was succeeded as president by Barry Richards in April 2007.

== Personal life and death ==
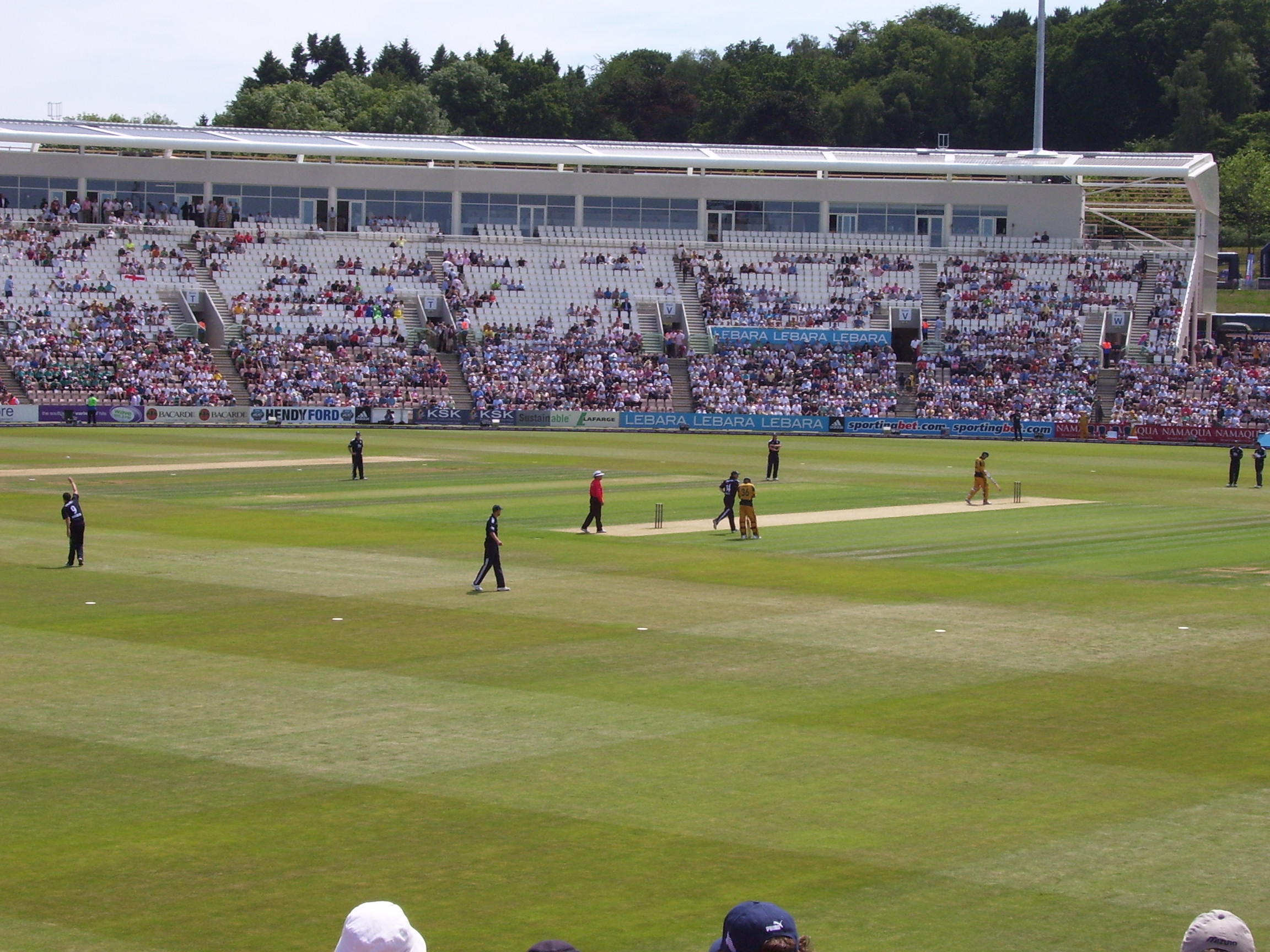
The East Stand (pictured) at the Rose Bowl was named in honour of Ingleby-Mackenzie

When he retired from business, Ingleby-Mackenzie became chairman of the Country Gentlemen's Association. He was reputedly one of the last to see Lord Lucan. He was a member of the exclusive Clermont Club and White's Club. Amongst his closest friends were the actors Albert Finney, John Standing, Edward Fox, and the comedian Ronnie Corbett. He was also a life member of the All England Lawn Tennis and Croquet Club, and captained Sunningdale Golf Club in 2000.

He was awarded the OBE in the 2005 Birthday Honours, for services to sport. In December of the same year, just before Christmas, Ingleby-Mackenzie was diagnosed with a brain tumour. He died just a few months after being diagnosed, dying on 9 March 2006, following brain surgery. For his funeral, the hearse carrying his coffin passed beneath and adjacent to the stands as it circled Lord's before making its way to Kensal Rise Crematorium. A memorial service for Ingleby-Mackenzie was held on 29 June 2006 at St Paul's Cathedral, that was attended by more than 1,600 people; amongst those in attendance were six members of Hampshire's 1961 County Championship winning team. After his death, Wisden remarked that he "was one of the most extraordinary, and best-loved, men ever to play cricket". Prior to his death, he lived in St John's Wood. He was survived by his wife, Susan, who he had married in 1975, their daughter, and four stepchildren. Susan died on 12 November 2020, aged 83.

In 2012, Hampshire named two new stands at the Rose Bowl after Ingleby-Mackenzie and the Australian Shane Warne; the east stand was named after Ingleby-Mackenzie, with a naming ceremony taking place during a One Day International between England and the West Indies, that was attended by members of his family.

== Works cited ==
- Williams, Charles (2012). Gentlemen & Players: The Death of Amateurism in Cricket. London: Orion. ISBN 978-0-2976-0809-7.

Sporting positions
Preceded by Desmond Eagar	Hampshire cricket captain 1958–1965	Succeeded by Roy Marshall
