= England cricket team Test results (1960–1974) =

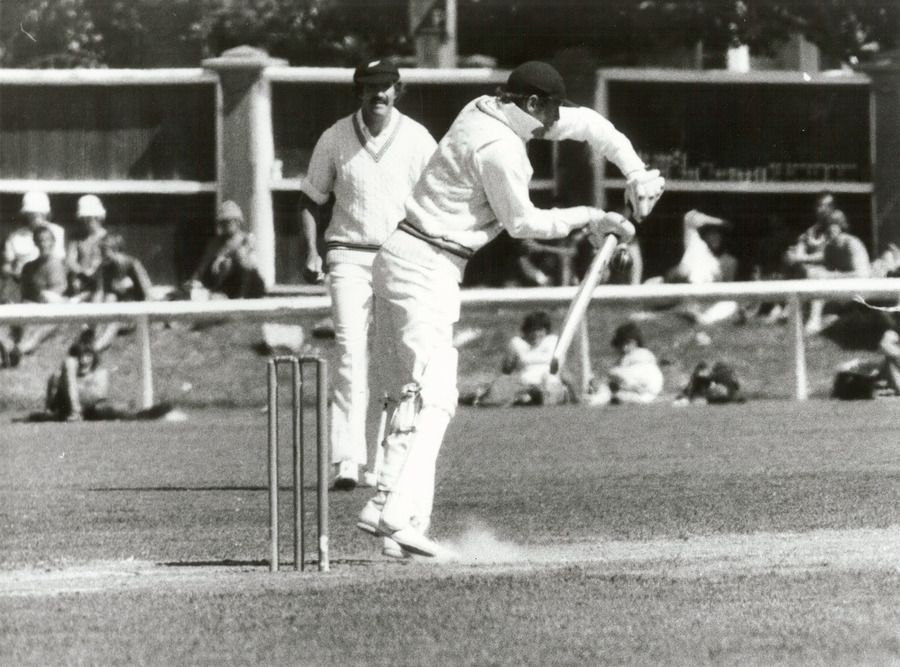
Geoffrey Boycott was one of England's leading run-scorers in Tests between 1960 and 1974.

Between 1960 and 1974 the England cricket team represented England, Scotland and Wales in Test cricket. (Note: The England cricket team represented Scotland until 1992, when they left the UK Cricket Council and later joined the International Cricket Council (ICC) as an independent member.) During that time England played 147 Test matches, resulting in 45 victories, 77 draws and 25 defeats. Their win to loss ratio of 1.80 was the best in Test cricket during this period. In the English summer of 1965, England played their last Test series against South Africa for almost 30 years, due to the sporting boycott of South Africa during the apartheid era. A 1968–69 series between the pair in South Africa was cancelled due to the D'Oliveira affair, a controversy over whether or not the England selectors would pick Basil D'Oliveira, a mixed-race player of South African origin. A later tour of England in 1970 was called off after pressure from James Callaghan, the British Home Secretary. The tour was replaced by a series against a Rest of the World team. At the time, they were considered test matches, but that status was revoked by the International Cricket Conference (ICC) and they are now unofficial Tests, though still first-class matches.

England faced Australia most frequently during this period—playing 39 matches against them—followed by the West Indies. England won more matches than they lost against India, New Zealand, Pakistan and South Africa, but against Australia they won eight and lost ten Ashes matches, while against the West Indies they won seven and lost nine. England won 13 matches by an innings, which included their second largest victory ever, when they won by an innings and 285 runs against India in 1974. Their largest victory by runs alone during this period was in the 1970–71 Ashes series against Australia, when they won by 299 runs, while they won by ten wickets on three occasions. Conversely, England lost by an innings on four occasions, and their 1973 loss to the West Indies by an innings and 226 runs remains their second largest defeat in Test history.

== Key ==
Key
Symbol	Meaning
No. (Eng.)	Match number for England (i.e. 300 was England's 300th Test match)
No. (Ove.)	Match number overall (i.e. 300 was the 300th Test match)
Opposition	The team England were playing against
Venue	The cricket ground where the match was played
(H)	Home ground
(A)	Away ground
Start date	Starting date of the Test match
Result	Result of the match for England
Series (result)	What series the match was part of, with the result listed in brackets; England's tally first (i.e. (2–1) means that England won two matches, and their opponents won one match)

== Matches ==
England Test cricket results between 1960 and 1974
No. (Eng.)	No. (Ove.)	Opposition	Venue	Start date	Result	Series (result)
359	485	West Indies	Kensington Oval, Bridgetown (A)	6 January 1960	Match drawn	English cricket team in the West Indies in 1959–60 (1–0)
360	488	West Indies	Queen's Park Oval, Port of Spain (A)	28 January 1960	Won by 256 runs	English cricket team in the West Indies in 1959–60 (1–0)
361	489	West Indies	Sabina Park, Kingston (A)	17 February 1960	Match drawn	English cricket team in the West Indies in 1959–60 (1–0)
362	490	West Indies	Bourda, Georgetown (A)	9 March 1960	Match drawn	English cricket team in the West Indies in 1959–60 (1–0)
363	491	West Indies	Queen's Park Oval, Port of Spain (A)	25 March 1960	Match drawn	English cricket team in the West Indies in 1959–60 (1–0)
364	492	South Africa	Edgbaston, Birmingham (H)	9 June 1960	Won by 100 runs	South African cricket team in England in 1960 (3–0)
365	493	South Africa	Lord's, London (H)	23 June 1960	Won by an innings and 73 runs	South African cricket team in England in 1960 (3–0)
366	494	South Africa	Trent Bridge, Nottingham (H)	7 July 1960	Won by 8 wickets	South African cricket team in England in 1960 (3–0)
367	495	South Africa	Old Trafford, Manchester (H)	21 July 1960	Match drawn	South African cricket team in England in 1960 (3–0)
368	496	South Africa	The Oval, London (H)	18 August 1960	Match drawn	South African cricket team in England in 1960 (3–0)
369	507	Australia	Edgbaston, Birmingham (H)	8 June 1961	Match drawn	1961 Ashes series (1–2)
370	508	Australia	Lord's, London (H)	22 June 1961	Lost by 5 wickets	1961 Ashes series (1–2)
371	509	Australia	Headingley, Leeds (H)	6 July 1961	Won by 8 wickets	1961 Ashes series (1–2)
372	510	Australia	Old Trafford, Manchester (H)	27 July 1961	Lost by 54 runs	1961 Ashes series (1–2)
373	511	Australia	The Oval, London (H)	17 August 1961	Match drawn	1961 Ashes series (1–2)
374	512	Pakistan	Lahore Stadium, Lahore (A)	21 October 1961	Won by 5 wickets	English cricket team in Pakistan in 1961–62 (1–0)
375	513	India	Brabourne Stadium, Bombay (A)	11 November 1961	Match drawn	English cricket team in India in 1961–62 (0–2)
376	514	India	Green Park Stadium, Kanpur (A)	1 December 1961	Match drawn	English cricket team in India in 1961–62 (0–2)
377	516	India	Feroz Shah Kotla Ground, Delhi (A)	13 December 1961	Match drawn	English cricket team in India in 1961–62 (0–2)
378	518	India	Eden Gardens, Calcutta (A)	30 December 1961	Lost by 187 runs	English cricket team in India in 1961–62 (0–2)
379	520	India	Madras Cricket Club Ground, Madras (A)	10 January 1962	Lost by 128 runs	English cricket team in India in 1961–62 (0–2)
380	521	Pakistan	Dacca Stadium, Dacca (A)	19 January 1962	Match drawn	English cricket team in Pakistan in 1961–62 (1–0)
381	522	Pakistan	National Stadium, Karachi (A)	2 February 1962	Match drawn	English cricket team in Pakistan in 1961–62 (1–0)
382	530	Pakistan	Edgbaston, Birmingham (H)	31 May 1962	Won by an innings and 24 runs	Pakistani cricket team in England in 1962 (4–0)
383	531	Pakistan	Lord's, London (H)	21 June 1962	Won by 9 wickets	Pakistani cricket team in England in 1962 (4–0)
384	532	Pakistan	Headingley, Leeds (H)	5 July 1962	Won by an innings and 119 runs	Pakistani cricket team in England in 1962 (4–0)
385	533	Pakistan	Trent Bridge, Nottingham (H)	26 July 1962	Match drawn	Pakistani cricket team in England in 1962 (4–0)
386	534	Pakistan	The Oval, London (H)	16 August 1962	Won by 10 wickets	Pakistani cricket team in England in 1962 (4–0)
387	535	Australia	The Gabba, Brisbane (A)	30 November 1962	Match drawn	1962–63 Ashes series (1–1)
388	536	Australia	Melbourne Cricket Ground, Melbourne (A)	29 December 1962	Won by 7 wickets	1962–63 Ashes series (1–1)
389	537	Australia	Sydney Cricket Ground, Sydney (A)	11 January 1963	Lost by 7 wickets	1962–63 Ashes series (1–1)
390	538	Australia	Adelaide Oval, Adelaide (A)	25 January 1963	Match drawn	1962–63 Ashes series (1–1)
391	539	Australia	Sydney Cricket Ground, Sydney (A)	15 February 1963	Match drawn	1962–63 Ashes series (1–1)
392	540	New Zealand	Eden Park, Auckland (A)	23 February 1963	Won by an innings and 215 runs	English cricket team in New Zealand in 1962–63 (3–0)
393	541	New Zealand	Basin Reserve, Wellington (A)	1 March 1963	Won by an innings and 47 runs	English cricket team in New Zealand in 1962–63 (3–0)
394	542	New Zealand	Lancaster Park, Christchurch (A)	15 March 1963	Won by 7 wickets	English cricket team in New Zealand in 1962–63 (3–0)
395	543	West Indies	Old Trafford, Manchester (H)	6 June 1963	Lost by 10 wickets	West Indian cricket team in England in 1963 (1–3)
396	544	West Indies	Lord's, London (H)	20 June 1963	Match drawn	West Indian cricket team in England in 1963 (1–3)
397	545	West Indies	Edgbaston, Birmingham (H)	4 July 1963	Won by 217 runs	West Indian cricket team in England in 1963 (1–3)
398	546	West Indies	Headingley, Leeds (H)	25 July 1963	Lost by 221 runs	West Indian cricket team in England in 1963 (1–3)
399	547	West Indies	The Oval, London (H)	22 August 1963	Lost by 8 wickets	West Indian cricket team in England in 1963 (1–3)
400	551	India	Madras Cricket Club Ground, Madras (A)	10 January 1964	Match drawn	English cricket team in India in 1963–64 (0–0)
401	552	India	Brabourne Stadium, Bombay (A)	21 January 1964	Match drawn	English cricket team in India in 1963–64 (0–0)
402	554	India	Eden Gardens, Calcutta (A)	29 January 1964	Match drawn	English cricket team in India in 1963–64 (0–0)
403	556	India	Feroz Shah Kotla Ground, Delhi (A)	8 February 1964	Match drawn	English cricket team in India in 1963–64 (0–0)
404	557	India	Green Park Stadium, Kanpur (A)	15 February 1964	Match drawn	English cricket team in India in 1963–64 (0–0)
405	561	Australia	Trent Bridge, Nottingham (H)	4 June 1964	Match drawn	1964 Ashes series (0–1)
406	562	Australia	Lord's, London (H)	18 June 1964	Match drawn	1964 Ashes series (0–1)
407	563	Australia	Headingley, Leeds (H)	2 July 1964	Lost by 7 wickets	1964 Ashes series (0–1)
408	564	Australia	Old Trafford, Manchester (H)	23 July 1964	Match drawn	1964 Ashes series (0–1)
409	565	Australia	The Oval, London (H)	13 August 1964	Match drawn	1964 Ashes series (0–1)
410	571	South Africa	Kingsmead, Durban (A)	4 December 1964	Won by an innings and 104 runs	English cricket team in South Africa in 1964–65 (1–0)
411	572	South Africa	Wanderers Stadium, Johannesburg (A)	23 December 1964	Match drawn	English cricket team in South Africa in 1964–65 (1–0)
412	573	South Africa	Newlands Cricket Ground, Cape Town (A)	1 January 1965	Match drawn	English cricket team in South Africa in 1964–65 (1–0)
413	575	South Africa	Wanderers Stadium, Johannesburg (A)	22 January 1965	Match drawn	English cricket team in South Africa in 1964–65 (1–0)
414	578	South Africa	St George's Oval, Port Elizabeth (A)	12 February 1965	Match drawn	English cricket team in South Africa in 1964–65 (1–0)
415	591	New Zealand	Edgbaston, Birmingham (H)	27 May 1965	Won by 9 wickets	New Zealand cricket team in England in 1965 (3–0)
416	592	New Zealand	Lord's, London (H)	17 June 1965	Won by 7 wickets	New Zealand cricket team in England in 1965 (3–0)
417	593	New Zealand	Headingley, Leeds (H)	8 July 1965	Won by an innings and 187 runs	New Zealand cricket team in England in 1965 (3–0)
418	594	South Africa	Lord's, London (H)	22 July 1965	Match drawn	South African cricket team in England in 1965 (0–1)
419	595	South Africa	Trent Bridge, Nottingham (H)	5 August 1965	Lost by 94 runs	South African cricket team in England in 1965 (0–1)
420	596	South Africa	The Oval, London (H)	26 August 1965	Match drawn	South African cricket team in England in 1965 (0–1)
421	597	Australia	The Gabba, Brisbane (A)	10 December 1965	Match drawn	1965–66 Ashes series (1–1)
422	598	Australia	Melbourne Cricket Ground, Melbourne (A)	30 December 1965	Match drawn	1965–66 Ashes series (1–1)
423	599	Australia	Sydney Cricket Ground, Sydney (A)	7 January 1966	Won by an innings and 93 runs	1965–66 Ashes series (1–1)
424	600	Australia	Adelaide Oval, Adelaide (A)	28 January 1966	Lost by an innings and 9 runs	1965–66 Ashes series (1–1)
425	601	Australia	Melbourne Cricket Ground, Melbourne (A)	11 February 1966	Match drawn	1965–66 Ashes series (1–1)
426	602	New Zealand	Lancaster Park, Christchurch (A)	25 February 1966	Match drawn	English cricket team in New Zealand in 1965–66 (0–0)
427	603	New Zealand	University Oval, Dunedin (A)	4 March 1966	Match drawn	English cricket team in New Zealand in 1965–66 (0–0)
428	604	New Zealand	Eden Park, Auckland (A)	11 March 1966	Match drawn	English cricket team in New Zealand in 1965–66 (0–0)
429	605	West Indies	Old Trafford, Manchester (H)	2 June 1966	Lost by an innings and 40 runs	West Indian cricket team in England in 1966 (1–3)
430	606	West Indies	Lord's, London (H)	16 June 1966	Match drawn	West Indian cricket team in England in 1966 (1–3)
431	607	West Indies	Trent Bridge, Nottingham (H)	30 June 1966	Lost by 139 runs	West Indian cricket team in England in 1966 (1–3)
432	608	West Indies	Headingley, Leeds (H)	4 August 1966	Lost by an innings and 55 runs	West Indian cricket team in England in 1966 (1–3)
433	609	West Indies	The Oval, London (H)	18 August 1966	Won by an innings and 34 runs	West Indian cricket team in England in 1966 (1–3)
434	618	India	Headingley, Leeds (H)	8 June 1967	Won by 6 wickets	Indian cricket team in England in 1967 (3–0)
435	619	India	Lord's, London (H)	22 June 1967	Won by an innings and 124 runs	Indian cricket team in England in 1967 (3–0)
436	620	India	Edgbaston, Birmingham (H)	13 July 1967	Won by 132 runs	Indian cricket team in England in 1967 (3–0)
437	621	Pakistan	Lord's, London (H)	27 July 1967	Match drawn	Pakistani cricket team in England in 1967 (2–0)
438	622	Pakistan	Trent Bridge, Nottingham (H)	10 August 1967	Won by 10 wickets	Pakistani cricket team in England in 1967 (2–0)
439	623	Pakistan	The Oval, London (H)	24 August 1967	Won by 8 wickets	Pakistani cricket team in England in 1967 (2–0)
440	627	West Indies	Queen's Park Oval, Port of Spain (A)	19 January 1968	Match drawn	English cricket team in the West Indies in 1967–68 (1–0)
441	629	West Indies	Sabina Park, Kingston (A)	8 February 1968	Match drawn	English cricket team in the West Indies in 1967–68 (1–0)
442	633	West Indies	Kensington Oval, Bridgetown (A)	29 February 1968	Match drawn	English cricket team in the West Indies in 1967–68 (1–0)
443	635	West Indies	Queen's Park Oval, Port of Spain (A)	14 March 1968	Won by 7 wickets	English cricket team in the West Indies in 1967–68 (1–0)
444	636	West Indies	Bourda, Georgetown (A)	28 March 1968	Match drawn	English cricket team in the West Indies in 1967–68 (1–0)
445	637	Australia	Old Trafford, Manchester (H)	6 June 1968	Lost by 159 runs	1968 Ashes series (1–1)
446	638	Australia	Lord's, London (H)	20 June 1968	Match drawn	1968 Ashes series (1–1)
447	639	Australia	Edgbaston, Birmingham (H)	11 July 1968	Match drawn	1968 Ashes series (1–1)
448	640	Australia	Headingley, Leeds (H)	25 July 1968	Match drawn	1968 Ashes series (1–1)
449	641	Australia	The Oval, London (H)	22 August 1968	Won by 226 runs	1968 Ashes series (1–1)
450	647	Pakistan	Lahore Stadium, Lahore (A)	21 February 1969	Match drawn	English cricket team in Pakistan in 1968–69 (0–0)
451	649	Pakistan	Dacca Stadium, Dacca (A)	28 February 1969	Match drawn	English cricket team in Pakistan in 1968–69 (0–0)
452	650	Pakistan	National Stadium, Karachi (A)	6 March 1969	Match drawn	English cricket team in Pakistan in 1968–69 (0–0)
453	653	West Indies	Old Trafford, Manchester (H)	12 June 1969	Won by 10 wickets	West Indian cricket team in England in 1969 (2–0)
454	654	West Indies	Lord's, London (H)	26 June 1969	Match drawn	West Indian cricket team in England in 1969 (2–0)
455	655	West Indies	Headingley, Leeds (H)	10 July 1969	Won by 30 runs	West Indian cricket team in England in 1969 (2–0)
456	656	New Zealand	Lord's, London (H)	24 July 1969	Won by 230 runs	New Zealand cricket team in England in 1969 (2–0)
457	657	New Zealand	Trent Bridge, Nottingham (H)	7 August 1969	Match drawn	New Zealand cricket team in England in 1969 (2–0)
458	658	New Zealand	The Oval, London (H)	21 August 1969	Won by 8 wickets	New Zealand cricket team in England in 1969 (2–0)
459	674	Australia	The Gabba, Brisbane (A)	27 November 1970	Match drawn	1970–71 Ashes series (2–0)
460	675	Australia	WACA Ground, Perth (A)	11 December 1970	Match drawn	1970–71 Ashes series (2–0)
461	676	Australia	Sydney Cricket Ground, Sydney (A)	9 January 1971	Won by 299 runs	1970–71 Ashes series (2–0)
462	677	Australia	Melbourne Cricket Ground, Melbourne (A)	21 January 1971	Match drawn	1970–71 Ashes series (2–0)
463	678	Australia	Adelaide Oval, Adelaide (A)	29 January 1971	Match drawn	1970–71 Ashes series (2–0)
464	679	Australia	Sydney Cricket Ground, Sydney (A)	12 February 1971	Won by 62 runs	1970–71 Ashes series (2–0)
465	681	New Zealand	Lancaster Park, Christchurch (A)	25 February 1971	Won by 8 wickets	English cricket team in New Zealand in 1970–71 (1–0)
466	682	New Zealand	Eden Park, Auckland (A)	5 March 1971	Match drawn	English cricket team in New Zealand in 1970–71 (1–0)
467	687	Pakistan	Edgbaston, Birmingham (H)	3 June 1971	Match drawn	Pakistani cricket team in England in 1971 (1–0)
468	688	Pakistan	Lord's, London (H)	17 June 1971	Match drawn	Pakistani cricket team in England in 1971 (1–0)
469	689	Pakistan	Headingley, Leeds (H)	8 July 1971	Won by 25 runs	Pakistani cricket team in England in 1971 (1–0)
470	690	India	Lord's, London (H)	22 July 1971	Match drawn	Indian cricket team in England in 1971 (0–1)
471	691	India	Old Trafford, Manchester (H)	5 August 1971	Match drawn	Indian cricket team in England in 1971 (0–1)
472	692	India	The Oval, London (H)	19 August 1971	Lost by 4 wickets	Indian cricket team in England in 1971 (0–1)
473	698	Australia	Old Trafford, Manchester (H)	8 June 1972	Won by 89 runs	1972 Ashes series (2–2)
474	699	Australia	Lord's, London (H)	22 June 1972	Lost by 8 wickets	1972 Ashes series (2–2)
475	700	Australia	Trent Bridge, Nottingham (H)	13 July 1972	Match drawn	1972 Ashes series (2–2)
476	701	Australia	Headingley, Leeds (H)	27 July 1972	Won by 9 wickets	1972 Ashes series (2–2)
477	702	Australia	The Oval, London (H)	10 August 1972	Lost by 5 wickets	1972 Ashes series (2–2)
478	703	India	Feroz Shah Kotla Ground, Delhi (A)	20 December 1972	Won by 6 wickets	English cricket team in India in 1972–73 (1–2)
479	706	India	Eden Gardens, Calcutta (A)	30 December 1972	Lost by 28 runs	English cricket team in India in 1972–73 (1–2)
480	708	India	Madras Cricket Club Ground, Madras (A)	12 January 1973	Lost by 4 wickets	English cricket team in India in 1972–73 (1–2)
481	709	India	Green Park Stadium, Kanpur (A)	25 January 1973	Match drawn	English cricket team in India in 1972–73 (1–2)
482	711	India	Brabourne Stadium, Bombay (A)	6 February 1973	Match drawn	English cricket team in India in 1972–73 (1–2)
483	715	Pakistan	Lahore Stadium, Lahore (A)	2 March 1973	Match drawn	English cricket team in Pakistan in 1972–73 (0–0)
484	717	Pakistan	Niaz Stadium, Hyderabad (A)	16 March 1973	Match drawn	English cricket team in Pakistan in 1972–73 (0–0)
485	719	Pakistan	National Stadium, Karachi (A)	24 March 1973	Match drawn	English cricket team in Pakistan in 1972–73 (0–0)
486	722	New Zealand	Trent Bridge, Nottingham (H)	7 June 1973	Won by 38 runs	New Zealand cricket team in England in 1973 (2–0)
487	723	New Zealand	Lord's, London (H)	21 June 1973	Match drawn	New Zealand cricket team in England in 1973 (2–0)
488	724	New Zealand	Headingley, Leeds (H)	5 July 1973	Won by an innings and 1 run	New Zealand cricket team in England in 1973 (2–0)
489	725	West Indies	The Oval, London (H)	26 July 1973	Lost by 158 runs	West Indian cricket team in England in 1973 (0–2)
490	726	West Indies	Edgbaston, Birmingham (H)	9 August 1973	Match drawn	West Indian cricket team in England in 1973 (0–2)
491	727	West Indies	Lord's, London (H)	23 August 1973	Lost by an innings and 226 runs	West Indian cricket team in England in 1973 (0–2)
492	731	West Indies	Queen's Park Oval, Port of Spain (A)	2 February 1974	Lost by 7 wickets	English cricket team in the West Indies in 1973–74 (1–1)
493	732	West Indies	Sabina Park, Kingston (A)	16 February 1974	Match drawn	English cricket team in the West Indies in 1973–74 (1–1)
494	734	West Indies	Kensington Oval, Bridgetown (A)	6 March 1974	Match drawn	English cricket team in the West Indies in 1973–74 (1–1)
495	737	West Indies	Bourda, Georgetown (A)	22 March 1974	Match drawn	English cricket team in the West Indies in 1973–74 (1–1)
496	738	West Indies	Queen's Park Oval, Port of Spain (A)	30 March 1974	Won by 26 runs	English cricket team in the West Indies in 1973–74 (1–1)
497	739	India	Old Trafford, Manchester (H)	6 June 1974	Won by 113 runs	Indian cricket team in England in 1974 (3–0)
498	740	India	Lord's, London (H)	20 June 1974	Won by an innings and 285 runs	Indian cricket team in England in 1974 (3–0)
499	741	India	Edgbaston, Birmingham (H)	4 July 1974	Won by an innings and 78 runs	Indian cricket team in England in 1974 (3–0)
500	742	Pakistan	Headingley, Leeds (H)	25 July 1974	Match drawn	Pakistani cricket team in England in 1974 (0–0)
501	743	Pakistan	Lord's, London (H)	8 August 1974	Match drawn	Pakistani cricket team in England in 1974 (0–0)
502	744	Pakistan	The Oval, London (H)	22 August 1974	Match drawn	Pakistani cricket team in England in 1974 (0–0)
503	746	Australia	The Gabba, Brisbane (A)	29 November 1974	Lost by 166 runs	1974–75 Ashes series (1–4)
504	748	Australia	WACA Ground, Perth (A)	13 December 1974	Lost by 9 wickets	1974–75 Ashes series (1–4)
505	749	Australia	Melbourne Cricket Ground, Melbourne (A)	26 December 1974	Match drawn	1974–75 Ashes series (1–4)

== Summary ==
Team	Total matches					Home matches					Away matches				
Team	Mat	Won	Lost	Draw	W/L	Mat	Won	Lost	Draw	W/L	Mat	Won	Lost	Draw	W/L
Australia	39	8	10	21	0.800	20	4	6	10	0.666	19	4	4	11	1.000
India	24	7	5	12	1.400	9	6	1	2	6.000	15	1	4	10	0.250
New Zealand	17	11	0	6	–	9	7	0	2	–	8	4	0	4	–
Pakistan	23	8	0	15	–	14	7	0	7	–	9	1	0	8	–
South Africa	13	4	1	8	4.000	8	3	1	4	3.000	5	1	0	4	–
West Indies	31	7	9	15	0.777	16	4	8	4	0.500	15	3	1	11	3.000
Total	147	45	25	77	1.800	76	31	16	29	1.937	71	14	9	48	1.555
