= Hassan Shah =

Pakistani cricketer and umpire (1895–1957)

Personal information
- Full name: Syed Hassan Shah
- Born: 10 February 1895; Lahore, Punjab, British India
- Died: 28 September 1957 (aged 62); Multan, Punjab, Pakistan
- Batting: Right-handed
- Bowling: Right-arm medium

Domestic team information
- Years: Team
- 1914/15–1926/27: Muslims

Umpiring information
- FC umpired: 13 (1933–1953)

Career statistics
Competition	First-class
Matches	18
Runs scored	689
Batting average	28.70
100s/50s	0/6
Top score	95
Balls bowled	722
Wickets	16
Bowling average	22.31
5 wickets in innings	0
10 wickets in match	0
Best bowling	4/6
Catches/stumpings	16/–
- Source: CricketArchive, 17 April 2026

Syed Hassan Shah (10 February 1895 – 28 September 1957) was a Pakistani cricket player and umpire. He played first-class cricket in British India from 1914–15 to 1926–27, and umpired first-class cricket in British India and Pakistan from 1933–34 to 1953–54. He umpired the first two first-class matches played in Pakistan.

== Playing career ==
Shah was born in Lahore. A middle-order batsman and useful bowler, he played most of his first-class cricket for the Muslims teams in the Bombay Quadrangular and the Lahore Tournament in the years after the First World War. Captaining the team in the 1925–26 Lahore Tournament, he made 90 and took three wickets and three catches in the match against Hindus.

Shah made his highest score of 95, the highest score on either side in the match, against Hindus in the Bombay Quadrangular in 1920–21. His best bowling figures were 4 for 6 (off 7 overs) against Parsees in 1921–22.

== Umpiring career ==
Shah umpired several first-class matches in India in the 1930s, including the Ranji Trophy final in 1935–36. He resumed umpiring first-class cricket immediately after Pakistan gained independence in 1947. He umpired the first two first-class matches in Pakistan, held in the 1947–48 season. The next season, 1948–49, he umpired the first match played by the Pakistan team, when the touring West Indians played them at Bagh-e-Jinnah, Lahore; his colleague in this match was Daud Khan.
