= T. A. Ramachandran =

Indian cricket umpire (1912–1951)

Personal information
- Born: 12 September 1912
- Died: 13 April 1951 (aged 38)

Umpiring information
- Tests umpired: 1 (1948)
- Source: Cricinfo, 15 July 2013

T. A. Ramachandran (12 September 1912 – 13 April 1951) was an Indian cricket umpire. He stood in one Test match, India vs. West Indies, in 1948.

== See also ==
- List of Test cricket umpires
- West Indian cricket team in India in 1948–49
