= 1972 English cricket season =

The 1972 English cricket season was the 73rd in which the County Championship had been an official competition. There was an increase in limited overs cricket with the introduction of the Benson & Hedges Cup, which was part mini-league and part knockout along the lines of soccer's World Cup competition. It caused another reduction in the number of County Championship matches and the B&H (as it was often called) was never popular among cricket's traditional followers. The tournament lasted until 2002, after which it was effectively replaced by Twenty20. The County Championship was won by Warwickshire for the third time in their history. Australia toured England and the Test series was drawn 2–2.

== Honours ==
- County Championship – Warwickshire
- Gillette Cup – Lancashire
- Sunday League – Kent
- Benson & Hedges Cup – Leicestershire
- Minor Counties Championship – Bedfordshire
- Second XI Championship – Nottinghamshire II
- Wisden – Greg Chappell, Dennis Lillee, Bob Massie, John Snow, Keith Stackpole

== Test series ==
A very entertaining England v Australia series resulted in a 2–2 draw, which meant that England retained the Ashes. There was an outstanding individual performance by Australian seamer Bob Massie who, assisted by heavy atmospheric conditions that enabled him to "swing" the ball prodigiously, took 16 wickets in the Lord's Test.

Cumulative record – Test wins	1876–1972
England	70
Australia	82
Drawn	62

== Leading batsmen ==
1972 English cricket season – leading batsmen by average
Name	Innings	Runs	Highest	Average	100s
Geoffrey Boycott	22	1230	204*	72.35	6
Greg Chappell	28	1260	181	70.00	4
Rohan Kanhai	30	1607	199	64.28	8
Majid Khan	38	2074	204	61.00	8
Mushtaq Mohammad	40	1949	137*	59.06	6

1972 English cricket season – leading batsmen by aggregate
Name	Innings	Runs	Highest	Average	100s
Majid Khan	38	2074	204	61.00	8
Mushtaq Mohammad	40	1949	137*	59.06	6
Glenn Turner	38	1764	170	51.88	7
Keith Fletcher	36	1763	181*	58.76	5
Brian Luckhurst	37	1706	184*	55.03	3

== Leading bowlers ==
1972 English cricket season – leading bowlers by average
Name	Balls	Maidens	Runs	Wickets	Average
Ian Chappell	263	14	106	10	10.60
Mike Procter	2557	108	960	58	16.55
Bob Massie	2290	115	851	50	17.02
Chris Old	2273	106	931	54	17.24
Terry Spencer	984	46	333	19	17.52

1972 English cricket season – leading bowlers by aggregate
Name	Balls	Maidens	Runs	Wickets	Average
Tom Cartwright	5178	373	1827	98	18.64
Barry Stead	4482	173	1998	98	20.38
Jack Birkenshaw	4983	225	1976	90	21.95
Robin Jackman	4195	141	2076	84	24.71
Pat Pocock	4178	177	2010	83	24.21

== Annual reviews ==
- Playfair Cricket Annual 1973
- Wisden Cricketers' Almanack 1973
