= Sri Lankan cricket team in England in 1984 =

International cricket tour

| | Sri Lanka | England |
- Dates: 23 August – 28 August 1984
| Captains | Duleep Mendis | David Gower |

Test series
- Result: 1-match series drawn 0–0
| Most runs | Duleep Mendis (205) | Allan Lamb (107) |
| Most wickets | Ashantha de Mel (4); Vinothen John (4) | Ian Botham (7) |
- Player of the series: Sidath Wettimuny (SL)

The Sri Lanka cricket team toured England in the 1984 season to play a one-match Test series against England. The only match was drawn.

== Test series summary ==
23 – 28 August 1984
(5–day match)
Scorecard

| Sri Lanka | v | England |
| 491/7d (166 overs); S Wettimuny 190 (471); PI Pocock 2/75 (41 overs) | | 370 (147.1 overs); AJ Lamb 107 (195); VB John 4/98 (39.1 overs) |
| 294/7d (80 overs); SAR Silva 102* (255); IT Botham 6/90 (27 overs) |

Match drawn
Lord's, London
Umpires: HD Bird and DGL Evans
Player of the match: S Wettimuny (SL)

- England won the toss and elected to field.
- 26 August was taken as a rest day.
- PA de Silva (SL) made his Test debut.

== Annual reviews ==
- Playfair Cricket Annual 1985
- Wisden Cricketers' Almanack 1985
