= English cricket team in India, Pakistan and Sri Lanka in 1972–73 =

International cricket tour

English cricket team in India in 1972-73
- Date: 5 December 1972 – 11 February 1973
- Location: India
- Result: India won the 5-Test series 2-1
Teams
- India: England
Captains
- Ajit Wadekar: Tony Lewis
Most runs
- Farokh Engineer (415) Viswanath (365) Ajit Wadekar (312): Tony Greig (382); Keith Fletcher (312); Mike Denness (257)
Most wickets
- Chandrasekhar (35) Bishan Singh Bedi (25) Erapalli Prasanna (10): Geoff Arnold (17); Chris Old (15); Derek Underwood (15)

The England national cricket team, organised by Marylebone Cricket Club (MCC), toured India, Pakistan and Sri Lanka from December 1972 to March 1973 and played a five-match Test series against the India national cricket team followed by three Tests against the Pakistan national cricket team. England were captained by Tony Lewis. The Sri Lanka national cricket team was not Test-qualified at that time and played a single first-class match against MCC in Colombo.

== Touring team ==
- Tony Lewis (captain)
- Dennis Amiss
- Geoff Arnold
- Jack Birkenshaw
- Bob Cottam
- Mike Denness
- Keith Fletcher
- Norman Gifford
- Tony Greig
- Alan Knott
- Chris Old
- Pat Pocock
- Graham Roope
- Roger Tolchard
- Derek Underwood
- Barry Wood

Donald Carr was the manager.

== Test matches in India ==
=== 1st Test ===
20–25 December 1972
scorecard

| India | v | England |
| 173 (84.4 overs); Syed Abid Ali 58; Geoff Arnold 6/45 (23.4 overs) | | 200 (108.5 overs); Tony Greig 68; Bhagwat Chandrasekhar 8/79 (41.5 overs) |
| 233 (98.4 overs); Eknath Solkar 75; Derek Underwood 4/56 (30 overs) | | 208/4 (88.5 overs); Tony Lewis 70; Bishan Singh Bedi 3/50 (39 overs) |

England won by 6 wickets
Feroz Shah Kotla, Delhi
Umpires: MV Nagendra, B Satyaji Rao

- India won the toss and decided to bat

=== 2nd Test ===
30 Dec–4 Jan 1973
scorecard

| India | v | England |
| 210 (97.4 overs); Farokh Engineer 75; Bob Cottam 3/45 (23 overs) | | 174 (75.2 overs); Alan Knott 35; Bhagwat Chandrasekhar 5/65 (26.2 overs) |
| 155 (67.5 overs); Salim Durani 53; Tony Greig 5/24 (19.5 overs) | | 163 (91 overs); Tony Greig 67; Bishan Singh Bedi 5/63 (40 overs) |

India won by 28 runs
Eden Gardens, Calcutta
Umpires: AM Mamsa, J Reuben

- India won the toss and decided to bat

=== 3rd Test ===
12–17 January 1973
scorecard

| England | v | India |
| 242 (86.5 overs); Keith Fletcher 97; Bhagwat Chandrasekhar 6/90 (38.5 overs) | | 316 (135.1 overs); Nawab of Pataudi 73; Pat Pocock 4/114 (46 overs) |
| 159 (106 overs); Mike Denness 76; Erapalli Prasanna 4/16 (10 overs) | | 86/6 (33.5 overs); Salim Durani 38; Pat Pocock 4/28 (13 overs) |

India won by 4 wickets
Madras Cricket Club Ground, Chepauk, Madras
Umpires: AM Mamsa, MV Nagendra

- England won the toss and decided to bat

=== 4th Test ===
25–30 January 1973
scorecard

| India | v | England |
| 357 (167 overs); Ajit Wadekar 90; Chris Old 4/69 (24 overs) | | 397 (172.5 overs); Tony Lewis 125; Bhagwat Chandrasekhar 4/86 (41 overs) |
| 186/6 (84 overs); Gundappa Viswanath 75; Derek Underwood 2/46 (26 overs) |

Match drawn
Modi Stadium, Kanpur
Umpires: MV Gothoskar, J Reuben

- India won the toss and decided to bat

=== 5th Test ===
6–11 February 1973
scorecard

| India | v | England |
| 448 (138.2 overs); Farokh Engineer 121; Geoff Arnold 3/64 (21 overs) | | 480 (163.1 overs); Tony Greig 148; Bhagwat Chandrasekhar 5/135 (46.1 overs) |
| 244/5 d. (96 overs); Sunil Gavaskar 67; Derek Underwood 2/70 (38 overs) | | 67/2 (29 overs); Graham Roope 26; Bishan Singh Bedi 1/25 (10 overs) |

Match drawn
Brabourne Stadium, Bombay
Umpires: MV Gothoskar, J Reuben

- India won the toss and decided to bat

== Sri Lanka ==
Having left India in February, MCC played three matches in Sri Lanka, one of which was first-class against the Sri Lanka national team, which MCC won by 7 wickets.

== Pakistan ==
In March, England played three Tests in Pakistan which were all drawn.
