= Dattatraya Naik =

Indian cricket umpire

Personal information
- Full name: Dattatreya Krishna Naik
- Born: 1 May 1890
- Died: 25 April 1968 (aged 77); Bombay, India

Umpiring information
- Tests umpired: 1 (1948)
- Source: ESPNcricinfo, 14 July 2013

Dattatraya Naik (1 May 1890 – 25 April 1968) was an Indian cricket umpire. He stood in one Test match, India vs. West Indies, in 1948. He was on the umpires panel of the Board of Control for Cricket in India and the Bombay Cricket Association.

== See also ==
- List of Test cricket umpires
- West Indian cricket team in India in 1948–49
