= English cricket team in Ceylon and Pakistan in 1968–69 =

International cricket tour

The England national cricket team, under the auspices of Marylebone Cricket Club (MCC), toured Ceylon and Pakistan from January to March 1969 and played a three-match Test series against the Pakistani national cricket team. The Test series was drawn 0–0. England were captained by Colin Cowdrey and Pakistan by Saeed Ahmed. As Ceylon had not then achieved Test status, the international played at the Paikiasothy Saravanamuttu Stadium, Colombo, is classified as a first-class match. It ended in a draw.

== Test series summary ==
=== First Test ===
21–24 February 1969
(4-day match)
Scorecard

England	v	Pakistan
306 (119.1 overs); MC Cowdrey 100; Saeed Ahmed 4/64 (20 overs)		209 (70.2 overs); Asif Iqbal 70; RMH Cottam 4/50 (22.2 overs)
225/9d (84.5 overs); KWR Fletcher 83; Asif Masood 3/68 (25 overs)		203/5 (79 overs); Majid Khan 68; RMH Cottam 2/35 (13 overs)

Match drawn
Lahore Stadium, Lahore
Umpires: Munawar Hussain and Shujauddin

- England won the toss and elected to bat.
- RMH Cottam (ENG), and Aftab Gul and Asif Masood (both PAK) made their Test debuts.

=== Second Test ===
28 February–3 March 1969
(4-day match)
Scorecard

Pakistan	v	England
246 (110.1 overs); Mushtaq Mohammad 52; JA Snow 4/70 (25 overs)		274 (132.4 overs); BL D'Oliveira 114*; Pervez Sajjad 4/75 (37 overs)
195/6d (101 overs); Majid Khan 49*; DL Underwood 5/94 (44 overs)		33/0 (20 overs); RM Prideaux 18*

Match drawn
Dacca Stadium, Dhaka, Bangladesh
Umpires: Mohammad Gulzar Mir and Shujauddin

- Pakistan won the toss and elected to bat.

=== Third Test ===
6–8 March 1969
(5-day match)
Scorecard

England	v	Pakistan
502/7 (175.1 overs); C Milburn 139; Intikhab Alam 3/129 (48 overs)

Match drawn
National Stadium, Karachi
Umpires: Daud Khan and Shujauddin

- England won the toss and elected to bat.
- The match was abandoned due to riots shortly before lunch on the third day.
- Sarfraz Nawaz (PAK) made his Test debut.
