= Andy Ganteaume =

Trinidadian cricketer

Personal information
- Full name: Andrew Gordon Ganteaume
- Born: 22 January 1921; Belmont, Trinidad and Tobago
- Died: 17 February 2016 (aged 95)
- Batting: Right-handed
- Role: Wicket-keeper

International information
- National side: West Indies
- Only Test (cap 60): 11 February 1948 v England

Domestic team information
- Years: Team
- 1940–1963: Trinidad and Tobago

Career statistics
Competition	Test	First-class
Matches	1	50
Runs scored	112	2,785
Batting average	112.00	34.81
100s/50s	1/0	5/17
Top score	112	159
Balls bowled	0	48
Wickets	–	0
Bowling average	–	–
5 wickets in innings	–	–
10 wickets in match	–	–
Best bowling	–	–
Catches/stumpings	0/–	34/3
- Source: Cricinfo, 31 October 2009

Andrew Gordon Ganteaume (22 January 1921 – 17 February 2016) was a Trinidadian cricketer who played one Test match for the West Indies in 1948 as a batsman. He scored 112 in his only Test innings which left him with the highest Test batting average in history until it was surpassed by Kurtis Patterson. Ganteaume played for Trinidad from a young age and was chosen to play in a Test match against England following his good batting form in 1948. However, his slow scoring probably cost him his place and he never played another Test, although he toured England with the West Indies in 1957. At the time of his death, Ganteaume was the oldest surviving West Indies Test cricketer.

== Early life ==
Ganteaume was born in Belmont, Port of Spain, Trinidad and Tobago. He had no formal cricket coaching but made his first-class debut for Trinidad as a wicketkeeper in 1941 as a 19-year-old. He scored 87 batting at number eight. Over the next few seasons, Ganteaume played regularly for Trinidad in first-class competition and for North Trinidad in a non-first-class island competition. He also played football for the Trinidad team around this time, but his time for sport was restricted by his career in the civil service.

From batting in the middle-order, Ganteaume was eventually promoted to open the batting as a theory at the time suggested that wicketkeepers might make good openers as they became accustomed to the conditions while keeping wicket; Ganteaume neither believed this theory nor enjoyed being an opener. He scored his maiden first-class century in 1946; a second followed later in the year.

== Test match call-up ==
In the 1947–48 season, the England cricket team toured the West Indies. When the team played in Trinidad, Ganteaume scored 101 and 47 not out in the first match but journalists criticised him for scoring slowly in easy batting conditions. In a second match against the touring side, he scored 5 and 90 but was not selected in the team for the Test match which followed—Ganteaume later suggested his non-selection was a result of his underprivileged background. However, an injury to Jeff Stollmeyer, one of the West Indies' opening batsmen, before the game meant that Ganteaume was called up into the side.

England batted first to score 362, but when the West Indies batted, Ganteaume and his opening partner, George Carew shared a partnership of 173. Once more, Ganteaume was criticised for slow batting, although he later suggested that he had concentrated on scoring singles to allow his in-form partner to face the bowling. On the third day, he carried on batting to reach his century, the first in a Test match by a Trinidadian in Trinidad. The innings took around 270 minutes, but he slowed down as he neared three-figures, and the West Indies' captain sent out a note asking the batsmen to score faster. Other batsmen also batted slowly, and Ganteaume later claimed that England used negative, run-saving tactics to slow the scoring rate. He did not bat in the second innings, when the West Indies needed to score runs quickly in an unsuccessful attempt to win the game. The match was drawn, having been earlier interrupted by rain which cut the playing time, but in the knowledge that quick scoring was vital, Ganteaume's slow batting adversely affected the West Indies' chances of victory.

Ganteaume did not play in the next Test match, he was replaced by John Goddard who came into the team as part of a pre-arranged scheme to rotate the captaincy. Ganteaume was chosen in a preliminary 24-man squad to tour India and Pakistan in 1948–49, but did not make the final selection of 16 players, and was overlooked for the 1950 tour of England. He continued to play irregularly for Trinidad in the following years, but played no further representative cricket until 1957.

== Later career ==
Ganteaume was selected to tour England with the West Indies team in 1957 at the age of 36. He played 19 first-class matches on the tour and scored 800 runs at an average of 27.58. He passed fifty in seven innings, with a top-score of 92 against Glamorgan. Norman Preston, the editor of Wisden Cricketers' Almanack, suggested neither Ganteaume nor any of the other three specialist opening batsmen in the team "came up to expectations", forcing Frank Worrell to open the batting. He never came close to selection for a Test match. After the tour, Ganteaume played just twice more for Trinidad in first-class cricket, and ended his career with 2,785 first-class runs at an average of 34.81 and five centuries. Having played just one Test innings, Ganteaume was left with a Test batting average of 112, the highest career average by a former player.

There are several possible reasons why Ganteaume played no further Test cricket after his single match. Apart from the slow pace of his batting during that hundred—Goddard later suggested that it would have been better for Ganteaume's career to score a rapid 60 than a slow hundred— West Indies' batting was strong at the time and there was plenty of competition for places in the team. Even so, his teammate and later West Indies captain Jeff Stollmeyer suggested that he was unlucky to be left out of subsequent teams. It is also possible that Ganteaume's career was affected by his attitude to authority. The cricket journalist Martin Williamson suggests: "Ganteaume probably paid as much for his anti-establishment attitude as for slow scoring. He was certainly not someone who was going to bow and scrape to the white players who still dominated the region's cricket." In later years, Ganteaume served as a Test selector and was West Indies manager in 1973–74. In 2007, his autobiography, My Story: The Other Side of the Coin was published, in which he criticised the West Indies "establishment" of his playing days. He died at the age of 95 on 17 February 2016. At the time of his death he was the oldest surviving West Indies Test cricketer, and the second oldest in the world.

== See also ==
- One Test Wonder
- Lists of oldest cricketers
