= Anwar Hussain (cricketer) =

Pakistani cricketer (1920–2002)

Personal information
- Full name: Anwar Hussain Khokhar
- Born: 16 July 1920; Lahore, British India
- Died: 9 October 2002 (aged 82); Lahore, Pakistan
- Batting: Right-handed
- Bowling: Right-arm fast-medium
- Relatives: Aslam Khokhar (cousin)

International information
- National side: Pakistan (1952)
- Test debut (cap 2): 16 October 1952 v India
- Last Test: 12 December 1952 v India

Career statistics
Competition	Test	First-class
Matches	4	45
Runs scored	42	1,511
Batting average	7.00	26.98
100s/50s	0/0	0/12
Top score	17	81
Balls bowled	36	2,910
Wickets	1	36
Bowling average	29.00	36.02
5 wickets in innings	0	0
10 wickets in match	0	0
Best bowling	1/25	4/66
Catches/stumpings	0/–	14/–
- Source: ESPNcricinfo, 12 July 2019

Anwar Hussain Khokhar (16 July 1920 – 9 October 2002) (Urdu:انور حسین کھوکھر) was a Pakistani cricketer who was a member of Pakistan's first Test team in 1952.

== Early life and family ==
Born in Lahore, Khokhar was a cousin of another Pakistani cricketer Aslam Khokhar.

== Career ==
Khokhar played first-class cricket in Indian competitions from 1941 to 1947, and in Pakistan from 1947 to 1955. He faced the first ball bowled in first-class cricket in Pakistan when he opened the batting for Sind against West Punjab in December 1947.

His best first-class performances came when he captained Sind against the touring West Indians in 1948–49; he scored 12 and 81 and took 4 for 66 and 1 for 19 in the drawn match. He was selected to play in Pakistan's first representative match a week later against the West Indians, but with little success. He was a member of Pakistan's first touring team later that season, playing in both matches against Ceylon in Colombo. He also played one of the representative matches when Ceylon toured Pakistan in 1949-50.

When the England team toured in 1951–52, he made 48 in Pakistan's second innings, adding a valuable 83 for the sixth wicket with the captain, Abdul Hafeez Kardar, in Pakistan's four-wicket victory that secured the nation's Test status. He played in four of the five Test matches in Pakistan's inaugural series against India in 1952-53 when he was Kardar's vice-captain, but had little personal success. He announced his retirement from first-class cricket in November 1953 without citing a reason, although "power politics... in the cricket affairs" was speculated as the reason behind the decision.

Hussain died in Lahore on 9 October 2002 after suffering from liver cancer.
