= Cotham =

Cotham may refer to:

- Cotham, Bristol, the name of both a council ward of the city of Bristol, England, and a suburb of the city that falls within that ward
  - Cotham Marble, named after Cotham House in Cotham, Bristol
- Cotham, Nottinghamshire, a small village on the east bank of the River Devon, near Newark-on-Trent, England
- Caleb Cotham, American baseball player and coach

== See also ==
- Coatham, a district of Redcar, North Yorkshire
- Coatham Mundeville, a village near Darlington, County Durham
- Cottam (disambiguation)
