= George Carew (cricketer) =

West Indian cricketer (1910–1974)

Personal information
- Full name: George McDonald Carew
- Batting: Right-handed
- Bowling: Slow left-arm orthodox

International information
- National side: West Indies
- Test debut (cap 37): 8 January 1935 v England
- Last Test: 31 December 1948 v India

Career statistics
Competition	Test	First-class
Matches	4	39
Runs scored	170	2,131
Batting average	28.33	34.37
100s/50s	1/-	3/12
Top score	107	107
Balls bowled	18	1,210
Wickets	0	13
Bowling average	–	46.15
5 wickets in innings	–	0
10 wickets in match	–	0
Best bowling	–	2/6
Catches/stumpings	1/–	17/–
- Source: Cricinfo, 30 October 2022

George McDonald Carew (4 June 1910 – 9 December 1974) was a cricketer who played four Test matches for the West Indies between 1935 and 1948. He was a right-hand batsman from Barbados where he ran a taxi business.

He is best remembered for his innings in the Second Test against England at Port of Spain in 1947–48, when he scored 107 in a first wicket partnership with Andy Ganteaume that put on 173 runs. Wisden reported: "Wearing a chocolate-coloured felt hat and chewing gum the whole time, Carew, in an unorthodox display, used the hook and pull freely in a dazzling exhibition." He toured India with the West Indian team later that year but played only one Test.
