= Bapu Joshi =

Indian cricket umpire (1912–1994)

Personal information
- Full name: Anant Ramchandra Joshi
- Born: 10 March 1912
- Died: 2 March 1994 (aged 81)

Umpiring information
- Tests umpired: 12 (1949–1965)
- Source: ESPNcricinfo, 9 July 2013

Bapu Joshi (10 March 1912 – 2 March 1994) was an Indian cricket umpire. He stood in 12 Test matches between 1949 and 1965.

== See also ==
- List of Test cricket umpires
