= Francis Cottam =

English cricketer

Francis Cottam (6 June 1900 – 19 May 1987) was an English cricketer. He was a right-handed batsman and a left-arm slow bowler. He was born and died in Redhill, Surrey.

Cottam made just one first-class appearance, for Essex, during the 1922 season, against Dublin University. He did not bat during the match, but bowled for ten overs without taking a wicket.
