= Andy Cottam =

English cricketer

Personal information
- Full name: Andrew Colin Cottam
- Born: 14 July 1973 (age 53); Northampton, Northamptonshire, England
- Batting: Right-handed
- Bowling: Slow left-arm orthodox

Domestic team information
- Years: Team
- 1992–1996: Somerset
- 1995: Derbyshire
- 1993–1998: Devon

Career statistics
Competition	First-class	List A
Matches	13	6
Runs scored	153	24
Batting average	10.20	12.00
100s/50s	–/–	–/–
Top score	36	22*
Balls bowled	1708	290
Wickets	13	1
Bowling average	63.00	193.00
5 wickets in innings	–	–
10 wickets in match	–	–
Best bowling	2/5	1/45
Catches/stumpings	1/–	1/–
- Source: CricketArchive, 22 December 2015

Andrew Colin Cottam (born 14 July 1973 in Northampton, England) is an English cricket coach and former player. He was a right-handed batsman and a left-arm slow bowler. He played in 2 Under-19 Tests in 1992 and 13 first-class matches between 1992 and 1996. His father is the cricketer and coach Bob Cottam.

== Playing career ==
In 1990 Cottam started playing for Somerset Second XI and Devon. In 1992 he was selected for Under-19's tour of Pakistan and played in the Third Test and 2 one-day matches against Pakistan Under-19s. That summer he played in 6 County Championship matches for Somerset and in an Under-19 Test against Sri Lanka, when he took 4 wickets for 69 in the first innings. However, in 1993 he failed to make the Somerset First XI, apart from a one-day match against Kent.

In 1994 he moved to Northants but did not play for the first team and he signed for Derbyshire in 1995. He played in 4 County Championship matches and in a university game and was released at the end of the season. He returned to Somerset, where his father was director of cricket, and played in 2 County Championship matches in 1996. He played for Somerset Second XI in 1997 and for Devon until 1999.

Although an economy as a bowler of under three per over in first-class cricket was acceptable, Cottam's bowling did not look like it would do more than take the occasional wicket and he was always a tail-end batsman, so his first-class career was inevitably a short one.

== Coaching career ==
Cottam moved to Australia after the conclusion of his playing career to take up a coaching appointment with the Western Australian Cricket Association, specialising in coaching spin bowling. In 2017 he was recruited by Cricket Indonesia to serve as head coach of its men's and women's national teams. In 2021 he accepted an appointment at Bangladesh Krira Shikkha Protishtan, the country's national sports institute.

In June 2023, Cottam was appointed head coach of the Hong Kong women's national cricket team.
