= Tony Lewis =

Welsh cricketer & rugby union footballer

Tony Lewis CBE
Personal information
- Full name: Anthony Robert Lewis
- Born: 6 July 1938 (age 88); Swansea, Wales
- Batting: Right-handed
- Bowling: Leg break

International information
- National side: England

Career statistics
Competition	Tests	First-class
Matches	9	409
Runs scored	457	20495
Batting average	32.64	32.42
100s/50s	1/3	30/86
Top score	125	223
Balls bowled	–	521
Wickets	–	6
Bowling average	–	72.00
5 wickets in innings	–	–
10 wickets in match	–	–
Best bowling	–	3/18
Catches/stumpings	0/–	193/–

Anthony Robert Lewis CBE (born 6 July 1938) is a Welsh former cricketer, who captained England. He later became a journalist, hosting BBC Television cricket coverage between 1986 and 1998, and became president of the Marylebone Cricket Club (MCC).

== Early life ==
Tony Lewis was born in Swansea, the first of two children of Wilfrid Lewis and his wife Marjorie (née Flower). The family moved to Neath after the Second World War. Following his service in the war as a major, Wilfrid managed an insurance office in Neath, and then joined the Civil Service.

Tony Lewis attended the Gnoll School in Neath and Neath Grammar School for Boys, where he learned to play the violin exceptionally well and was selected to play first violin for the National Youth Orchestra of Wales, as well as playing cricket and rugby for the school. He represented the Welsh Secondary Schools v England Schools at cricket for five years and captained his country for three of them. In rugby football he made his first-class debut for Neath at the age of nineteen and followed up with a full season for Gloucester, as well as representing thereafter the Royal Air Force, Cambridge University and Pontypool. He also played cricket for the Royal Air Force and Combined Services. At Christ's College, Cambridge, he read History in which he graduated as BA and MA. In his first university year he was a freshman double blue in rugby union and cricket. He was elected President of the Christ's College Marguerites and in 1962, President of the University Hawks Club, residence of the highest achievers in all Cambridge sports.

== Cricket career ==
Lewis made his first-class cricket debut in 1955 at the age of 17, playing for Glamorgan against Leicestershire in the County Championship while still at Neath Grammar School. He was an amateur cricketer until the governing bodies of cricket decided that all first-class cricketers should sign professional playing contracts beginning in the 1963 season. In his first decade as a Glamorgan player he retained his amateur status, representing the Gentlemen in the Gentlemen v Players matches at Lord's and Scarborough.

He was also chosen as a first violinist by the National Youth Orchestra of Wales in 1955. After doing his national service in the RAF, he established himself in first-class cricket in 1960, when in his first year at Christ's College, he scored 1307 runs for Cambridge University at 43.56, followed by 616 runs at 30.80 when he played for Glamorgan later in the season. He captained Cambridge in his final season there in 1962, when in all matches he made 2188 runs at 40.51, with five centuries. He also topped 2000 runs in 1966, when he made 2190 runs, more than anybody else in the season, at 40.51, including his only double-century, 223 against Kent at Gravesend after Glamorgan had followed on. He captained Glamorgan from 1967 to 1972, taking the county to its second championship in 1969, when Glamorgan went through the season undefeated.

Lewis is the last man to captain England on his Test debut. He led England on a gruelling five-month tour in 1972/73 to India, Pakistan and Sri Lanka. He scored 70 not out in his debut Test in Delhi, which guided England to their first Test victory in India since 1951. England lost the next two Tests, but Lewis went on to score his maiden Test hundred (125) in the Fourth Test in Kanpur. He was nominated Man of the Match in both the Delhi and the Kanpur Tests. He went on to captain England eight times, winning once, losing twice and drawing five times. After the India series, his team went on to draw with Pakistan in a three-Test series. He played in nine Tests. After captaining England in the first 8 of them, he played his last Test in 1973 under Illingworth's captaincy against New Zealand. In the light of his achievements, Lewis was picked as vice captain to Ray Illingworth, when the latter returned from his self-imposed hiatus the following summer. But he played in only one Test in the English season of 1973. Lewis was asked by the selectors to make himself available to lead the England team in the West Indies on the 1973–74 tour, but having had an injury-plagued season in 1973, he declined in order to take up opportunities in writing and broadcasting.

Lewis is one of two England cricket captains to come out of Neath Grammar School, the other being Cyril Walters when he was playing for Worcestershire. Walters was nominated captain for a single Test when R. E. S. Wyatt withdrew at the last moment, and captains were always chosen from the amateurs in the team. Lewis, however, remains the only Glamorgan player to captain England and the only one to lead England on a major Test tour abroad. Lewis and Allan Watkins are the only Glamorgan players who have scored a century in a Test match for England.

In 1968 and for three years, he was one of the founding members of the Sports Council for Wales.

Lewis sat on MCC committees from 1967 (Pitches, Cricket and Registration) and on a long succession of MCC and ECB boards and committees, until he founded MCC's World Cricket Committee in 2006 which he chaired until 2011. The MCC appointed him as Honorary Life Vice President, from the date of his retirement from Committees in 2011. He was the 31st MCC member to be so honoured. He was MCC's Bi-Centenary President for two years: 1998–2000.

== Later career ==
Lewis also played rugby union for Neath and Gloucester before winning a blue for Cambridge in The Varsity Match in 1959. Chronic knee trouble, which had curtailed his rugby career, meant that Lewis retired from cricket at the age of 34, but writing and broadcasting had always been his main pursuit since 1965, when he began writing rugby union reports for The Daily Telegraph. In 1975 he was appointed Cricket and Rugby correspondent of The Sunday Telegraph. He was a founding member of the Sports Council for Wales in 1968 and put in long service to Glamorgan County Cricket Club as chairman, chairman of cricket followed later as president and trustee. His broadcasting extended from Test Match Special to the anchor man of all of BBC television's coverage of cricket, from 1975 to 1999, and he was the initial presenter (10 years) of the popular Radio 4 magazine programme, Sport on Four.

After long service to cricket at Lord's – committee work from 1967 to 2011 – he created, and chaired for five years, the MCC World Cricket Committee, from 2006 to 2011, opposing all cricket decisions that were led by money, race or religion. He initiated MCC research into the use of both the white and pink ball in day/night Test matches. He was MCC President for two years (1998–2000), during which he joined with his predecessor Colin Ingleby-Mackenzie in the work of securing admission to the Club of women members and securing their playing programme while Ch. MCC Cricket 2001–2006. He became, in 2011, the 31st Honorary Life Vice-President of MCC to be nominated by the Club, the highest honour possible to award to a Member.

Lewis turned his high profile in cricket and broadcasting to the benefit of his home country's tourist board. When WTB Chairman for three terms, he made an important strategic change as he studied the passage of American tourists year after year circumnavigating Wales on their visits to the United Kingdom. Their route was from London Heathrow, to Alton Towers, to Scotland, on to Ireland and home again. He urged what he called event-led tourism to Wales; this bore fruit immediately as Wales hosted the Rugby World Cup in 1999, and was followed by his personal leadership between 2000 and 2002 of the successful Wales bid to stage a Ryder Cup on Welsh soil for the first time, at Celtic Manor, Newport, in 2010. He worked for the University College of Wales, Newport, as a consultant for five years. His sporting contribution continued as captain of Royal Porthcawl Golf Club in 2012.

Lewis served eight years as chairman of the Wales Tourist Board and as a member of the British Tourist Authority. For a three-year term he was Chairman of the Welsh National Opera Company. He was also a founding Trustee of the Wales Millennium Centre. His first Committee work for the Marylebone Cricket Club was in 1964, and his last in 2011; apart from being MCC Millennium President from 1998 to 2000, he chaired both the Cricket Committee for five years and initiated and chaired MCC's World Cricket Committee, from 2006 to 2011. He led the research into the Television Review System (DRS); with his predecessor he secured a two-thirds majority of 18,000 MCC members to win women's admittance into full MCC membership. This was exactly ten years before the Equality Act 2010 was law. Lewis led the research and development of the use of the pink cricket ball for day-night Test cricket in order to arrest declines in attendances, especially in the Southern Hemisphere. He chaired and led MCC's work to erect an iconic media centre in 1998 which won high architectural awards. In 2011 the MCC committee bestowed on him its highest possible recognition for his contributions by making him the 31st Honorary Life Vice-President nominated by members of the Club. During this time he was a consultant to World Sport Group and Windsor (later Longreach) Insurance.

Lewis served a year as High Sheriff of Mid Glamorgan for 1998. He was awarded the CBE for services to cricket, broadcasting and Wales, in the 2004 New Year Honours. He is an honorary Fellow of several Welsh universities: Cardiff, Swansea and University of Glamorgan.

From 2003, Lewis was a consultant to University College of Wales, Newport, and, having returned to live in Porthcawl in 2010 accepted the offices of Captain, Royal Porthcawl Golf Club and President, Wales, of the Lord's Taverners charity, both organisations among his lifetime allegiances which he still continues. He continued his freelance writing particularly as a weekly columnist for the Western Mail Magazine, launched January 2015 and in a wide range of freelance work.

In 1962 he married Joan Pritchard, who had attended Neath Grammar School for Girls and the Laban Art of Movement Studio in Addlestone, Surrey. They have two daughters, Joanna and Anabel. Both daughters, former Millfield pupils, are full members of MCC, while his wife, former chair of Governors at Edgarley Preparatory School for over a decade, is one of MCC's few lady Honorary Members.

== Bibliography ==
- Summer of Cricket (1976)
- Playing Days: An Autobiography (1985)
- Double Century : The Story of MCC and Cricket (1987)
- Cricket in Many Lands (1991)
- MCC Masterclass (1994)
- Taking Fresh Guard: A Memoir (2003)
