= Aslam Khokhar =

Pakistani cricketer (1920–2011)

- Aslam Khokhar in 1954

Personal information
- Born: 5 January 1920; Lahore, British Punjab, British India
- Died: 22 January 2011 (aged 91); Lahore, Punjab, Pakistan
- Batting: Right-handed
- Bowling: Legbreak
- Role: All-rounder
- Relatives: Anwar Hussain (cousin)

International information
- National side: Pakistan (1954)
- Only Test: 1 July 1954 v England

Career statistics
Competition	Test	First-class
Matches	1	46
Runs scored	34	1,863
Batting average	17.00	27.80
100s/50s	0/0	2/13
Top score	18	117
Balls bowled	–	1,040
Wickets	–	20
Bowling average	–	28.55
5 wickets in innings	–	1
10 wickets in match	–	0
Best bowling	–	6/26
Catches/stumpings	0/–	18/–
- Source: ESPNcricinfo, 12 June 2017

Mohammad Aslam Khokhar (5 January 1920 – 22 January 2011) was a Pakistani cricketer who played in one Test match in 1954.

== Biography ==
Khokhar was born in Lahore, Punjab to a Khokhar family and was a cousin of Anwar Hussain Khokhar, who was a member of Pakistan's first Test team in 1952.

Aslam Khokhar played in 45 first-class matches between 1938–39 and 1963–64, and scored the first ever century in first-class cricket in Pakistan when, batting for Punjab against Sind in December 1947, he made 117. In the second Test in England, he batted at number nine, scoring 16 and 18. He also umpired 3 Tests in the 1970s.

Khokhar died in a Lahore hospital after a prolonged illness, on 22 January 2011. AT the time of his death, he was Pakistan's oldest surviving Test cricketer.
