= Ken Rickards (cricketer) =

West Indian cricketer

Cricket information
- Batting: Right-handed
- Bowling: Right-arm legbreak

International information
- National side: West Indies
- Test debut (cap 66): 27 March 1948 v England
- Last Test: 31 December 1951 v Australia

Career statistics
Competition	Test	First-class
Matches	2	37
Runs scored	104	2,065
Batting average	34.66	38.96
100s/50s	0/1	2/15
Top score	67	195
Balls bowled	–	212
Wickets	–	1
Bowling average	–	128.00
5 wickets in innings	–	0
10 wickets in match	–	0
Best bowling	–	1/66
Catches/stumpings	0/–	10/–
- Source: CricInfo, 30 October 2022

Kenneth Roy Rickards (22 August 1923 – 21 August 1995) was a West Indian international cricketer who played in two Test matches from 1948 to 1952. He was born in Rollington Town in Jamaica and made his first class debut in 1946.

He played as a professional in the Lancashire League for Haslingden in 1951 in one game, and was brought back to Jamaica by public subscription for the 1953/4 tour by the MCC. However he failed in the final tour match and did not make the Test side.
