= English cricket team in Australia in 1965–66 =

International cricket tour

The England cricket team toured Australia in the 1965–66 season to play a five-match Test series against Australia for The Ashes. The tour was organised by the Marylebone Cricket Club and matches outside the Tests were played under the MCC name.

The series was drawn 1–1 and therefore Australia retained The Ashes.

== Test series summary ==
- 1st Test at Brisbane Cricket Ground – match drawn
- 2nd Test at Melbourne Cricket Ground – match drawn
- 3rd Test at Sydney Cricket Ground – England won by an innings and 93 runs
- 4th Test at Adelaide Oval – Australia won by an innings and 9 runs
- 5th Test at Melbourne Cricket Ground – match drawn

== Bibliography ==
- Harte, Chris (1993). A History of Australian Cricket. London: André Deutsch. ISBN 978-02-33988-25-2.
- Preston, Norman, ed. (1967). Wisden Cricketers' Almanack (104th ed.). London: Sporting Handbooks Ltd. OCLC 867874297.
- Robinson, Ray (1975). On Top Down Under. Australia: Cassell. ISBN 978-07-26973-64-2.
- Ross, Gordon, ed. (1966). Playfair Cricket Annual (19th ed.). London: Playfair Books Ltd. OCLC 773745992.
