= Michael Cottam =

English cricketer

Michael Cottam (born 23 September 1966) was an English cricketer. He was a right-handed batsman and right-arm medium-fast bowler who played for Devon. He was born in Southampton.

Cottam, who represented three different Second XI teams between 1983 and 1986, and who represented Devon in the Minor Counties Championship in 1988, made a single List A appearance for the team, during the 1988 NatWest Trophy, against Nottinghamshire. From the tailend, he did not bat in the match, but he took figures of 0–51 with the ball from twelve overs of bowling.
