= Geoff Arnold =

English cricketer (born 1944)

Personal information
- Full name: Geoffrey Graham Arnold
- Born: 3 September 1944 (age 82); Earlsfield, Surrey, England
- Nickname: Horse
- Height: 6 ft 1 in (1.85 m)
- Batting: Right-handed
- Bowling: Right arm fast-medium
- Role: Bowler

International information
- National side: England
- Test debut (cap 436): 10 August 1967 v Pakistan
- Last Test: 14 July 1975 v Australia
- ODI debut (cap 13): 24 August 1972 v Australia
- Last ODI: 18 June 1975 v Australia

Domestic team information
- Years: Team
- 1963–1977: Surrey
- 1976/77: Orange Free State
- 1978–1982: Sussex

Career statistics
Competition	Test	ODI	FC	LA
Matches	34	14	365	248
Runs scored	421	48	3,952	687
Batting average	12.02	16.00	13.67	8.48
100s/50s	0/1	0/0	0/7	0/0
Top score	59	18*	73	24*
Balls bowled	7,650	714	61,028	12,460
Wickets	115	19	1,130	332
Bowling average	28.29	17.84	21.91	19.45
5 wickets in innings	6	0	46	4
10 wickets in match	0	0	3	0
Best bowling	6/45	4/27	8/41	5/9
Catches/stumpings	9/–	2/–	122/–	53/–
- Source: Cricinfo, 26 November 2009

Geoffrey Graham Arnold (born 3 September 1944) is an English cricketer who played 34 Test matches and 14 One Day Internationals for the England cricket team. His nickname of "Horse" was based on his initials of GG. He was a seam and swing bowler, who finished his first-class cricket career, which lasted from 1963 to 1982, with 1130 wickets at an average of 21.91. He played for Surrey and Sussex, winning the County Championship with the former county in 1971. He was a Wisden Cricketer of the Year in 1972.

== Life and career ==
After touring Pakistan with the MCC Under-25 side in 1966–67, Arnold made his England debut in 1967 against Pakistan, a season during which he claimed 109 wickets. A succession of niggling injuries meant that he had to wait until the early 1970s before he became a fixture in the team. In 1974, he assisted Chris Old in bowling out India for 42 at Lord's. Surprisingly for an out-and-out seam bowler, he was fairly successful everywhere except in the West Indies. In 1972–73 series in India and Pakistan, he claimed 17 wickets (at 17.43), starting with match figures of 9 for 91 – his best – in the England win in Delhi. Against both New Zealand and the West Indies the following summer, Arnold delivered 310 overs and took 31 wickets. He and John Snow destroyed the New Zealand batting, but their potentially devastating bowling partnership fizzled out at that point. Initially joining Surrey as an allrounder, he made a half century in his second innings for England. Dropped after the 1975 Ashes series, he remained effective in county cricket.

In 1978, Arnold moved to Sussex, as a replacement for the then retired Snow, where he remained for five seasons. In later years he occasionally proved a determined lower order batsman.

After his playing career ended, he returned to Surrey as a bowling coach, and assisted at national level with upcoming pace bowlers. Arnold subsequently had a stint as bowling coach for Kent, and is currently performing that role at Northamptonshire.
