= 1963 County Championship =

English cricket tournament

- Dates: 1 May – 6 September 1963
- Administrator: England and Wales Cricket Board
- Cricket format: First-class cricket
- Tournament format: League system
- Champions: Yorkshire (26th title)
- Participants: 17
- Matches: 238
- Most runs: Peter Richardson, (Kent); 1,798
- Most wickets: Ken Palmer, (Somerset); 121

The 1963 County Championship was the 64th officially organised running of the County Championship. Yorkshire won their second consecutive Championship title.

The method for deciding the championship was changed as follows -

- Most points to determine champions
- Follow on restored
- One-day rules apply if the first two-thirds of playing time lost due to weather
- 10 points for a win
- 5 points for a tie
- 2 points for first innings lead in a drawn or lost match
- 1 point for a tie on first innings in a match drawn or lost
- 6 points for a win under one day rules

== Table ==
	Team	P	W	L	D	No Dec	1st Inns Lead	Pts
1	Yorkshire	28	13	3	11	1	7	144
2	Glamorgan	28	11	8	8	1	7	124
3	Somerset	28	10	6	11	1	9	118
=4	Sussex	28	10	6	12	0	8	116
=4	Warwickshire	28	10	3	14	1	8	116
6	Middlesex	28	9	5	11	3	8	106
7	Northamptonshire	28	9	8	11 (Note: Northamptonshire were awarded six points for the draw against Somerset, as they were batting fourth when scores were tied.)	0	5	105
8	Gloucestershire	28	9	7	11	1	5	100
9	Nottinghamshire	28	6	8	13	1	11	82
10	Hampshire	28	7	8	10	3	5	80
11	Surrey	28	5	6	17	0	12	74
12	Essex	28	6	4	17	1	5	70
13	Kent	28	5	6	17	0	9	68
14	Worcestershire	28	4	8	13	3	10	60
15	Lancashire	28	4	10	13	1	9	58
16	Leicestershire	28	3	13	10	2	5	40
17	Derbyshire	28	2	14	9	3	4	28
