= 1965 County Championship =

English cricket tournament

- Dates: 5 May – 3 September 1965
- Administrator: England and Wales Cricket Board
- Cricket format: First-class cricket
- Tournament format: League system
- Champions: Worcestershire (2nd title)
- Participants: 17
- Matches: 238
- Most runs: David Green, (Lancashire); 1,784
- Most wickets: Derek Shackleton, (Hampshire); 133

The 1965 County Championship was the 66th officially organised running of the County Championship. Worcestershire won their second consecutive Championship title.

On 19 and 20 May 1965, the match between Yorkshire and Hampshire, Yorkshire were bowled out for 23 runs in their second innings, their lowest ever first-class total.

== Table ==
- 10 points for a win
- 5 points to each team for a tie
- 5 points to team still batting in a match in which scores finish level
- 2 points for first innings lead in a match drawn or lost
- 1 point for first innings tie in a match lost
- If no play possible on the first two days, and the match does not go into the second innings, the team leading on first innings scores 6 points. If the scores are level, the team batting second scores 3 points.
- Position determined by points gained. If equal, then decided on most wins.
- Each team plays 28 matches.

	Team	P	W	L	D	No Dec	1st Inns Lead	Pts
1	Worcestershire	28	13	4	10	1	7	144
2	Northamptonshire	28	13	4	9	2	5	140
3	Glamorgan	28	12	6	8	2	6	132
4	Yorkshire	28	9	4	14	1	12	114
5	Kent	28	8	5	14	1	8	96
6	Middlesex	28	8	7	12	1	7	94
7	Somerset	28	8	11	8	1	6	92
8	Surrey	28	7	4	15 (Note: Surrey were awarded 6 points for the draw against Lancashire, which they won under one-day rules.)	2	8	92
9	Derbyshire	28	7	9	11	1	8	86
10	Gloucestershire	28	7	8	11	2	6	82
11	Warwickshire	28	5	5	18	0	10	70
12	Hampshire	28	5	4	17	2	8	66
13	Lancashire	28	5	13	9	1	5	60
14	Leicestershire	28	5	11	11	1	4	58
15	Essex	28	4	7	16	1	7	54
16	Sussex	28	4	10	14	0	6	52
17	Nottinghamshire	28	3	11	13	1	9	48
