= Pat Pocock =

Welsh cricketer

Personal information
- Full name: Patrick Ian Pocock
- Born: 24 September 1946 (age 80); Bangor, Caernarvonshire, Wales
- Nickname: Percy
- Height: 6 ft 1 in (1.85 m)
- Batting: Right-handed
- Bowling: Right-arm offbreak

International information
- National side: England (1968–1985)
- Test debut (cap 438): 29 February 1968 v West Indies
- Last Test: 31 January 1985 v India
- Only ODI (cap 84): 26 March 1985 v Pakistan

Domestic team information
- Years: Team
- Surrey: 1964–1986

Career statistics
Competition	Test	ODI
Matches	25	1
Runs scored	206	4
Batting average	6.24	4.00
100s/50s	0/0	0/0
Top score	33	4
Balls bowled	6,650	60
Wickets	67	0
Bowling average	44.41	–
5 wickets in innings	3	–
10 wickets in match	0	–
Best bowling	6/79	–
Catches/stumpings	15/–	0/–
- Source: CricInfo, 1 January 2006

Patrick Ian Pocock (born 24 September 1946) is a Welsh former cricketer, who played in 25 Test matches and one One Day International for the England cricket team between 1968 and 1985.

The cricket correspondent Colin Bateman opined, "The selectors never really trusted Pat Pocock, although he was one of the most authentic spin bowlers of his generation. Pocock's action was textbook high; he spun the ball, varied his angles, and had a sweet loop."

== Life and career ==
Pocock loved playing cricket, and had plenty of theories and experiments if the opposing batsmen got on top. His entire first-class cricket career was spent with Surrey County Cricket Club, and he got his first taste of the vagaries of international selection, when he replaced Fred Titmus, who had lost four toes in a boating accident, on the 1967–68 tour to the West Indies.

He then took 6 for 79 against Australia in the first Test at Old Trafford, Manchester, in 1968, and was then immediately dropped and replaced by Derek Underwood. Pocock was not selected again in the series, and appeared only sporadically thereafter. His next two home Tests were against the West Indies in 1976, but his final recall was some eight years and 86 Tests later; only Derek Shackleton (103 Tests) and Les Jackson (96 Tests) had previously missed more matches between Test appearances. Pocock finished his Test career on a happy note, under the captaincy of David Gower, and in a successful partnership with Phil Edmonds on England's 1984–85 tour of India.

Pocock is also known for having taken seven wickets in eleven balls for Surrey against Sussex in 1972. He captained Surrey in his final season in 1986, having made his debut for them in 1964. He finished with 1,607 first-class wickets at 26.53, with best bowling figures of 9 for 57.
