= Daud Khan (cricketer) =

Pakistani cricketer and umpire (1912–1979)

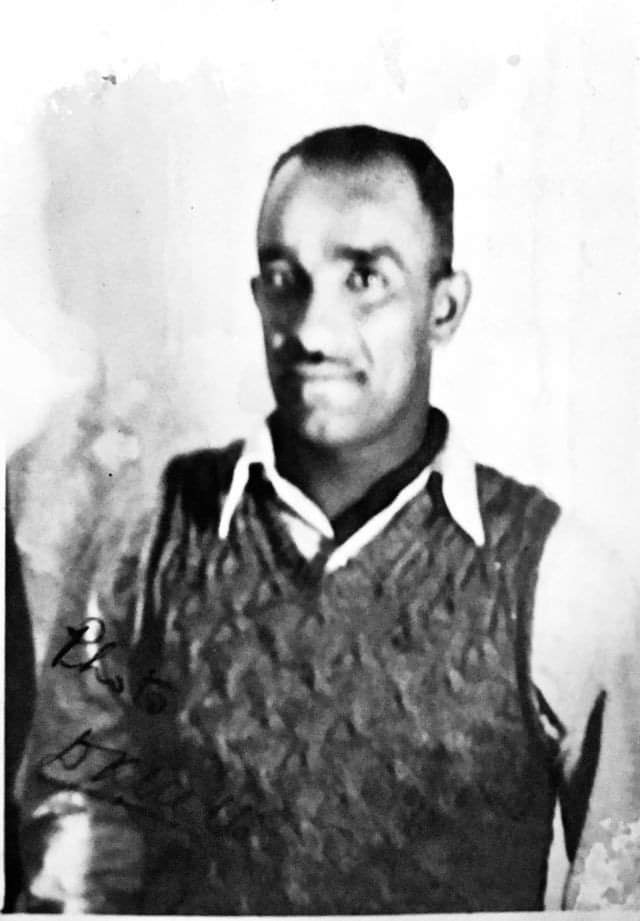

Personal information
- Born: 1912; Karachi, British India
- Died: 21 June 1979 (aged 66–67)
- Batting: Right-handed

Domestic team information
- Years: Team
- 1936-37 to 1947-48: Sind

Umpiring information
- Tests umpired: 14 (1955–1973)
- FC umpired: 136 (1948–1976)

Career statistics
Competition	First-class
Matches	20
Runs scored	764
Batting average	28.29
100s/50s	0/6
Top score	74 not out
Balls bowled	54
Wickets	0
Bowling average	–
5 wickets in innings	–
10 wickets in match	–
Best bowling	–
Catches/stumpings	12/–
- Source: CricketArchive, 6 September 2015

Daud Khan (1912–1979) was a cricket player and umpire. He played for the Sindh cricket team before and after Pakistan's independence from India. He later became a Test umpire.

== Playing career ==
Daud played 20 first-class matches as a middle-order batsman for Sind between 1936 and 1947. His highest score was 74 not out against Bombay in the Ranji Trophy in 1938–39.

== Umpiring career ==
Khan stood as an umpire in 136 first-class matches in Pakistan between 1948 and 1976, most of them in Karachi, including nine finals of the Quaid-e-Azam Trophy. Between 1955 and 1973, he officiated in 14 Tests. Along with Idrees Baig he stood in the first Test ever played in Pakistan, the First Test against India in Dacca beginning on New Year's Day 1955.

The Daud Khan Memorial Cricket Tournament, a 40-over competition held annually among clubs in Karachi, is named in his honour.
