= History of the West Indies cricket team =

The history of the West Indian cricket team begins in the 1880s when the first combined West Indian team was formed and toured Canada and the United States. In the 1890s, the first representative sides were selected to play visiting English sides. Administered by the West Indies Cricket Board ("WICB"), and known colloquially as The Windies, the West Indies cricket team represents a sporting confederation of English-speaking Caribbean countries.

The WICB joined the sport's international ruling body, the Imperial Cricket Conference, in 1926, and played their first official international match, which in cricket is called a Test, in 1928. Although blessed with some great players in their early days as a Test nation, their successes remained sporadic until the 1960s, by which time the side had changed from a white-dominated to a black-dominated side. By the late 1970s, the West Indies had a side recognised as unofficial world champions, a title they retained throughout the 1980s. Their team from the 1970s and 1980s is now widely regarded as having been one of the best in test cricket's history, alongside Don Bradman's Invincibles. During these glory years, the Windies were noted for their four-man fast bowling attack, backed up by some of the best batsmen in the world. The 1980s saw them set a then-record streak of 11 consecutive Test victories in 1984, which was part of a still-standing record of 27 tests without defeat (the other tests being draws), as well as inflicting two 5–0 "blackwashes" against the old enemy of England. Throughout the 1990s and 2000s, however, West Indian cricket declined, in part due to the rise in popularity of athletics and football in West Indian countries, and the team today is struggling to regain its past glory. However, the team has since won the ICC T20 World Cup twice (2012 and 2016, when it was styled World Twenty20), the ICC Champions Trophy once (2004), and the ICC Under 19 Cricket World Cup once (2016).

In their early days in the 1930s, the side represented the British colonies of the West Indies Federation plus British Guyana. The current side represents the now independent states of Antigua and Barbuda, Barbados, Dominica, Grenada, Guyana, Jamaica, Saint Kitts and Nevis, Saint Lucia, Saint Vincent and the Grenadines and Trinidad and Tobago, and the British dependencies of Anguilla, Montserrat and the British Virgin Islands along with the U.S. Virgin Islands and St. Maarten. National teams also exist for the various islands, which, as they are all separate countries, very much keep their local identities and support their local favourites. These national teams take part in the West Indian first-class competition, the Stanford 20/20, the Carib Beer Cup (earlier known as the Busta Cup, Shell Shield and various other names). It is also common for other international teams to play the island teams for warm-up games before they take on the combined West Indies team.

== Early Years and Formation (1890s–1928) ==
=== 1890s–1910s: Introduction and early cricketing culture ===
British colonists introduced cricket to the Caribbean in the 19th century, and it soon became embedded in the social and cultural fabric of the islands. British settlers and soldiers initially played the sport. Still, it gradually gained popularity among the local population, particularly as the Caribbean elite—many of whom had been educated in England—adopted the game as part of their lifestyle. By the late 19th century, cricket was widely played across the region, from Jamaica in the north to Trinidad and Tobago and Barbados in the south.

Cricket in the Caribbean islands grew organically, with each island developing its cricket culture. Friendly matches between local clubs became increasingly common, and by the late 19th century, matches between islands were regularly organised, fostering early rivalries and competition. Barbados, Trinidad and Tobago, Guyana (then British Guiana), and Jamaica were some of the first islands to develop a structured cricketing framework.

In 1891, the first Inter-Colonial Tournament was organised. It became an annual event and played a key role in fostering regional competition and cohesion. The tournament included teams from Barbados, Trinidad and Tobago, and Guyana and eventually expanded to include other islands. This tournament was instrumental in improving the standard of cricket in the region, as it allowed players from different islands to compete against each other regularly.

During this period, several talented Caribbean players emerged, many of whom impressed during regional tournaments and drew the attention of international observers. However, despite this growing talent, the West Indies team was still far from achieving Test status, as the sport was still heavily controlled by the British establishment, which saw the Caribbean colonies primarily as sources of raw materials and labour rather than as equals in the cricketing world.

=== 1920s: Pre-Test era and team formation ===
The 1920s marked a turning point for West Indies cricket. As cricket became more popular across the region, there was a growing desire for a unified team to represent the West Indies internationally. Until now, matches against overseas teams have often been played by individual islands or representative teams that were informally selected. However, the region began to form a more cohesive cricketing identity, setting the stage for the emergence of a full-fledged West Indies cricket team.

In 1923, the West Indies Cricket Board of Control (WICBC) was established, formalising cricket administration across the Caribbean islands. The formation of this governing body was a crucial step in the development of the West Indies cricket team, as it allowed the region to coordinate efforts in selecting and organising tours and lobby for recognition from the Imperial Cricket Conference, the governing body of international cricket at the time.

In the years leading up to their Test debut, the West Indies cricket team embarked on several international tours, gaining valuable experience and exposure to high-level competition. Notable tours included trips to England, where the West Indies played against county teams and English amateurs, and to Canada, where they participated in first-class matches. These tours allowed the West Indian players to hone their skills, learn from international cricketing cultures, and begin building a reputation for themselves on the global stage.

As the 1920s progressed, it became clear that the West Indies cricket team had the potential to compete at the highest levels of the game. With a growing pool of talented players and an increasing desire for recognition, the region began to push for full Test status.

In 1928, the West Indies cricket team reached a historic milestone when they were granted full Test status, becoming the fourth team to join the ranks of international Test cricket after England, Australia, and South Africa. This achievement reflected the region's growing prowess in the sport and the influence of British colonialism, which had fostered the spread of cricket across the empire.

== The early Tests (1930s and 1940s) ==
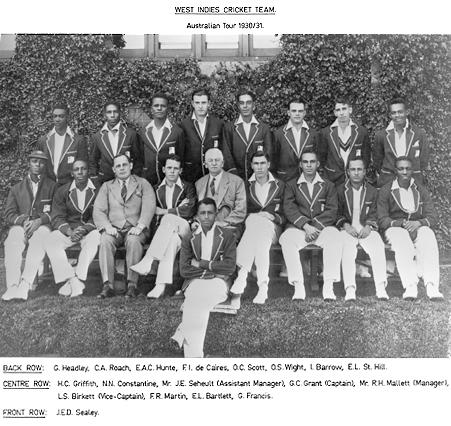
The West Indies team that toured Australia in 1930–31.

The West Indies played 19 Tests in the 1930s in four series against England and one against Australia. The first four of these were played against an England team led by the Honourable Freddie Calthorpe that toured in 1929–30. However, as Harold Gilligan was leading another English team to New Zealand at exactly the same time, this was not a full-strength England side. The series ended one-all, with the West Indies first ever Test victory being recorded on 26 February 1930. West Indian George Headley scored the most runs (703) in the rubber and Learie Constantine took the most wickets (18).

The West Indies toured Australia in 1930–31. They lost the Test series 4–1. The fifth and final Test showed some promise – batting first, the West Indies spent the first three days earning a 250-run lead with five wickets down in their second innings. A bold declaration was backed up by their bowlers, as Herman Griffith took four wickets and West Indies won by 30 runs to their first overseas Test victory. By the time the team left, they had left a good impression of themselves with the Australian public, although at first the team were faced with several cultural differences – for example, their hosts did not at first appreciate that the tourists' Roman Catholic beliefs would mean they would refuse to play golf on Sundays or engage in more ribald behaviour. The West Indian sides of the time were always led by white men, and the touring party to Australia comprised seven whites and eleven "natives", and the West Indian Board of Control wrote to their Australian counterparts saying "that all should reside at the same hotels". Australia at the time had in place its "White Australia" policy, with the Australian Board having to guarantee to the Government that the non-whites would leave at the end of the tour. When the West Indians arrived in Sydney, the whites were immediately given a different hotel from the blacks. They complained, and thereafter their wishes were met. The tour lost a lot of money, part of which was due to the Great Depression then affecting Australia. The West Indians won four and lost eight of their 14 first-class fixtures.

1933 saw another tour of England. Their hosts had just come back from defeating Australia in the infamous Bodyline series, where England's aggressive bowling at the body with a legside field attracted much criticism. England won the three-Test series of three-day Tests against the Windies 2–0. The second, drawn, Test at Old Trafford, Manchester, provided an intriguing footnote to the Bodyline controversy when Manny Martindale and Learie Constantine bowled Bodyline – fast, short-pitched balls aimed at the body – against the Englishmen, the only time they faced it in international cricket. The tactic did not work, as Douglas Jardine, the English captain who ordered his players to bowl it against the Australians, did not flinch as he scored his only Test century, making 127 out of England's 374.

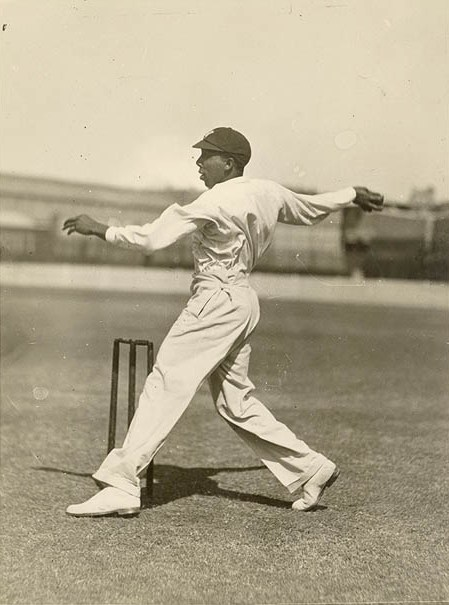
Learie Constantine

Another England tour of the West Indies followed in 1934–35. England won the first Test in Barbados on a poor pitch, affected by rain, and in a match where 309 runs were scored, England took a four-wicket victory. Both sides declared one of their innings closed to have their bowlers take advantage of the poor pitch. The second Test saw the Windies win by 217 runs, and a drawn third Test saw the series go to a decider at Sabina Park in Jamaica. A massive 270 not out from George Headley saw the Windies declare on 535 for 7. Despite a century from Les Ames, England could not avoid going down by an innings and 161 runs – the West Indies had secured their first Test series victory.

The West Indies toured England in 1939. England won the first Test at Lord's easily by 8 wickets, then there was a rain-affected draw in Manchester, and finally a high-scoring draw at the Oval in mid-August. The highlight of the series for the West Indies was George Headley scoring hundreds in both innings in the Lord's Test. With the clouds of World War II seemingly about to envelope Europe, the rest of the tour was cancelled and the Windies returned home. They would play no more Tests until 21 January 1948 saw the start of the first Test the West Indies played since the War, which resulted in a draw against the MCC side from England. The second Test was also drawn, with George Carew and Andy Ganteaume both making centuries. Ganteaume was then dropped, ending with a Test average of 112 – the highest in Test history. The West Indies won the final two Tests chasing sub-100 totals, and wrapped up the series 2–0, their first away-series victory.

In 1948, West Indies toured newly independent India for the first time for a five Test tour. The tour was preceded by a non-Test tour of Pakistan and followed by a similar short tour of Ceylon. After three high-scoring draws against the Indians, the West Indians wrapped up the fourth by an innings before a thrilling fifth Test, which left the Indians six runs away from victory with two wickets in hand as time ran out, so that the West Indies thus won the rubber 1–0. Carrying on from his hundred in the series against England, Everton Weekes set a record of scoring hundreds in five successive Test innings.

== The post-War period (1950s) ==
1950 saw another tour of England, the series saw the emergence for the West Indies of their great spinning duo, Sonny Ramadhin and Alf Valentine. England won the first Test by 202 runs, but Valentine and Ramadhin's bowling would win the series for the visitors. The second Test saw the Windies put on 326 thanks to 106 from Allan Rae before Valentine (4 for 48) and Ramadhin (5 for 66) skittled England in the first innings. A mammoth 168 from Clyde Walcott saw England set a theoretical target of 601. Ramadhin's 6 for 86 and Valentine's 3 for 79 dismissed the hosts for 274. The spinning duo took 12 wickets, Frank Worrell made 261 and Everton Weekes 129 as the third Test went the Windies way by 10 wickets, the fourth saw 14 wickets from Valentine and Ramadhin and centuries from Rae and Worrell as England were defeated by an innings. The West Indies won the series 3–1.

In 1951–1952 the Windies visited Australia. The first Test saw a narrow defeat by three wickets, with the two spinners seemingly continuing their form with twelve wickets between them. The second Test was lost by seven wickets, as Australia replied to the Windies 362 and 290 with 567 (which included centuries from Lindsay Hassett and Keith Miller) and 137 for 2. 6 wickets from Worrell in the third Test saw Australia dismissed for only 82, and the Windies eventually won by six wickets to pull back to two-one down in the series. The fourth Test saw the series lost in a narrow defeat. Worrell, batting with an injured hand, scored 108 and helped the Windies to 272 before Australia made 216 in reply. 203 from the Windies left Australia a target of 260. 5 wickets from Valentine helped reduced the Aussies to 222 for 9, 38 short with 1 wicket remaining. It didn't happen, as some brilliant running between the wicket for Australia by Bill Johnston and Doug Ring saw West Indies lose their composure and the match. The fifth Test saw three batting collapses, as Australia (116 and 377) beat Windies (78 and 213) by 202 runs to finish the rubber four-one winners. The West Indies then went on to New Zealand. In the first Test encounter between the two teams, the visitors scored a five wicket victory. In the second and final Test, Allan Rae scored 99, Jeffrey Stollmeyer 152, Frank Worrell 100 and Clyde Walcott 115 as the West Indies put on 546 for 6 declared. There wasn't enough time to bowl out the opposition twice though, as the hosts made 160 and were following-on at 17 for 1 when stumps were drawn, leaving the Windies series winners.

The Indians toured at the beginning of 1953. The Windies won the second of the five Tests that were played, with the others all being draws. The highlight of these games we Frank Worrell's 237 in the fifth Test, where all the three W's scored hundreds, as the West Indies scored a 1–0 series victory. Len Hutton led an MCC (England) side to the islands in 1953–1954. Sonny Ramadhin again starred for the Windies taking 23 wickets (no other West Indian took more than 8), as Walcott's 698 runs was more than 200 higher than second-placed West Indian, Everton Weekes. The five match rubber was drawn two-all.

Australia came and conquered in 1954–1955. After the Aussies made 515 in the first innings of the first Test, the Windies went down by 9 wickets. Then the Windies 382 was put in the shade by 600 for 9 declared by the visitors as the second Test was drawn. A low-scoring third Test saw Australia (257 and 133 for 2) beat the hosts (182 and 207) by 8 wickets. After Australia scored 668 in the fourth Test, the series was lost, although a double century from captain Denis Atkinson and a world-record stand for the seventh wicket allowed the Windies to reach 510 and draw the Test. The fifth Test saw the West Indies win the toss and bat. Walcott's 155 was the highest score of their 357. The Australians then batted and batted, in total for 245.4 overs in the 6-day Test, as they put on 758 for 8 declared, with five players making centuries. 319 in the West Indies' second innings left them defeated by an innings and 82 runs in the Test, and by three games to nil in the series. Walcott set records by scoring five hundreds, and hundreds in both innings of a match twice. A four-Test tour of New Zealand followed in February 1956. After two wins by an innings and one by 9 wickets, the Windies were surprised by the Kiwis in the fourth, dismissing them for 145 and 77 as they recorded their first ever Test win in their 45th Test.

John Goddard returned to captain the West Indians for a five-Test tour of England in 1957, which was lost three-nil, with England having the better of the two draws. Then 1957–1958 Gerry Alexander led a team that defeated Pakistan three-one. It was in this series in Jamaica that Garry Sobers scored 365 not out to record what was then the highest score in Test match cricket. Alexander went on to lead the West Indies to a three-nil win over five Tests in India, and a 2–1 defeat by Pakistan in a three match rubber in the following winter. In 1959–1960 he led as West Indies went down one-nil at home in a five-match series with England.

== A period of mixed fortunes (1960s) ==
Despite being a region where whites are a minority, until 1960 West Indies were always captained by white cricketers, though this was more social than racial discrimination. Throughout the 1950s, social theorist CLR James, the increasingly political former cricketer Learie Constantine and others called for a black captain. Constantine himself had stood in for Jackie Grant in the field against England on the 1934–35 tour, and George Headley captained the West Indies in the First Test against England in 1947–48 when the appointed, white captain, John Goddard was injured. However, no black was appointed as captain for a whole series until Frank Worrell was chosen to lead West Indies in their tour of Australia in 1960–61. In his three years as captain, Worrell moulded a bunch of talented but raw cricketers into probably the best team in the world.

In 1960, Australia were the best team in the world but on their way down, while West Indies were on their way up. It so happened that when they met, the two teams were of almost equal strength. The result was a series that has been recognised as one of the greatest of all time. The first Test in Brisbane was the first Test ever to end in a tie, which in cricket means the side batting last has been dismissed with scores level. The teams shared the next two Tests. In the fourth, Australia's last pair of Ken Mackay and Lindsay Kline played out the last 100 minutes of the match to earn a draw, while Australia won the final Test and the series by two wickets. One of the days of play was attended by a world-record crowd of 90,800. Such was the impression created by Worrell's team that the newly instituted trophy for the series between the two teams was named the Frank Worrell Trophy.

West Indies beat India 5–0 at home next year, and in 1963, they beat a fine English team by three matches to one. The Lord's Test of this series saw a famous finish. With two balls left, England needed six runs to win, and West Indies one wicket. The non-striker was Colin Cowdrey, who had his left arm in a sling, having fractured it earlier in the day. However, David Allen safely played out the last two balls and the match ended in a draw.

Worrell did, however, serve as the team manager^{[64]} when West Indies hosted Australia in 1964–65.^{[65]} The matches against Australia were bitterly fought, with accusations about Charlie Griffith's action (he was accused of throwing, which is banned in the laws of cricket) and bouncer wars.^{[66]} The West Indies won this series 2–1 to be the unofficial world champions. Sobers was not as good at man-management as Worrell and cracks soon began to appear.^{[67]} Often it was his individual brilliance that made the difference between a win and a loss.^{[68]} Throughout the 1960s, West Indies bowling was led by Wes Hall, Griffith, Lance Gibbs and Sobers himself.^{[69]} Hall and Griffith faded and then retired by the end of the decade,^{[70]} but WI could find no replacement for them till the mid-1970s.

Sobers was at his best in England in 1966,^{[71]} scoring 722 runs and taking 20 wickets in the five Tests. Three times he topped 150, and the 163* at Lord's turned a certain defeat into a near victory. West Indies won 3–1. England toured the West Indies in 1967–68^{[72]} for a series that became noted for England's deliberate slow play.^{[73]} West Indies were forced to follow on in the first Test but saved it without difficulty. The second Test was played on an underprepared wicket at Kingston. England won an important toss and scored 376. The bounce of the wicket having become very uneven, West Indies collapsed to 143 and followed on. On the fourth day in the second innings, a disputed decision led to a crowd riot, and the match had to be stopped for some time.^{[74]} In a curious decision, the West Indian Cricket Board (WICB) agreed to add a 75-minute sixth day to compensate for the lost time.^{[75]} Sobers played an outstanding innings of 113 not out, which allowed West Indies to set England a target of 159 in 155 minutes. England just about saved the game, losing eight wickets for 68. In the fourth Test West Indies gained a first innings lead of 122 at Port-of-Spain, but with the second innings score at 92 for 2, Sobers, frustrated by England's slow over rates and wanting to give himself a chance, albeit a small one, to win, surprisingly declared the innings, a decision for which he was widely criticised at the time.^{[76]} England were set a target of 215 in 165 minutes and they achieved it with 3 minutes to spare. West Indies made one last effort to win the final Test, but England drew it with only wicket left in their second innings. West Indies lost the series 0–1, the first defeat since 1960–61.

Australia and Bill Lawry had their revenge in 1968–69, when West Indies lost the away series 1–3.^{[77]} New Zealand managed to draw the series that followed,^{[78]} and then in 1969 West Indies were defeated 0–2 in England.^{[79]}

== World dominance (1970s) ==
West Indies' woes overflowed into the 1970s. At home in 1970–71, they lost to India for the first time. In the next year, a five Test series against New Zealand cricket team ended with no team coming close to winning one. A major find in the New Zealand series was Lawrence Rowe, who started off with a double century and century on his debut. Under Rohan Kanhai's captaincy, West Indies showed the first signs of revival. Australia won the closely fought 1972–73 series in the Caribbean by two Tests. With Sobers back – but Kanhai still the captain – West Indies defeated England 2–0 in 1973. This included a win by an innings and 226 runs at Lord's, their biggest win against England. The return series in West Indies ended 1–1, though the home team was the better side. Rowe continued his run scoring three centuries including a 302 at Kingston. The final Test of this 1973–74 series marked the end of an era in West Indies cricket – it was the last Test of both Garry Sobers and Rohan Kanhai, and marked the emergence of fast bowler Andy Roberts.

The new captain Clive Lloyd had made his first appearance in Test cricket in 1966 and had since become a fixture in the side. His avuncular, bespectacled appearance and a stoop near the shoulders masked the fact that he was a very fine fielder, especially in the covers, and a devastating stroke player. Lloyd's first assignment was the tour of India in 1974–75. West Indies won the first two Tests comfortably. Gordon Greenidge started his career with 107 and 93 in the first Test. Vivian Richards failed on his debut, but scored 192* in his second. India fought back to win the next two, but Lloyd hit 242* in the final Test to win the series.

Flag of the West Indies cricket team prior to 1999

West Indies won the inaugural World Cup in England in 1975, defeating Australia in the final. Then in 1975–76 they toured Australia, only to lose 1–5 in the six-Test series, and then beat India at home two-one in a four Test series later that same winter. It was in Australia that the quick bowler Michael Holding made his first appearance. Colin Croft and Joel Garner made their debuts the next year, and Malcolm Marshall two years after. In the span of about four years, West Indies brought together a bowling line-up of a quality that had rarely been seen before. The tour of India had seen the debut of Vivian Richards, arguably the finest West Indian batsman ever, and Gordon Greenidge, who joined a strong batting line-up that already included Alvin Kallicharran and opener Roy Fredericks in addition to Rowe and Lloyd. These players formed the nucleus of the side that became recognised as world Test match champions until the beginning of the 1990s.

Next came a tour of England in 1976. In a TV interview before the series, English captain Tony Greig commented that the West Indies tend to do badly under pressure and that "we'll make them grovel". This comment, especially as it came from a South African-born player, touched a raw nerve of the West Indians. Throughout the series, the English batsmen were subjected to what was described by the English press as very hostile bowling, but was rather reflective of a solid pace attack, and what the Windies had faced in Australia before. After the first two Tests ended in draws, West Indies won the next three. Of the many heroes for West Indies, Richards stood out with 829 runs in four Tests. He hit 232 at Trent Bridge and 291 at the Oval. Greenidge scored three hundreds, two of which were on the difficult wicket at Old Trafford. Roberts and Holding shared 55 wickets between them, Holding's 8 for 92 and 6 for 57 on the unhelpful wicket at the Oval being a superlative effort.

West Indies won a home series against a tough Pakistan side in 1976–77. A few months later, the World Series Cricket (WSC) controversy broke out. Most of the West Indian players signed up with Kerry Packer, an Australian TV magnate who was attempting to set up his own international cricket competition. The Australian team that toured West Indies the next year included no Packer players. West Indies Cricket Board fielded a full-strength team under the argument that none of the West Indies players had refused to play, but disputes arose in the matter of payment and about the selection of certain players. Before the third Test, Lloyd resigned his captaincy. Within two days all the other WSC-contracted players also withdrew. Alvin Kallicharran captained the team for the remaining Tests of the series, which the Windies won 3–1.

WICB allowed the WSC players to appear in the 1979 World Cup, and the West Indies retained the title with little difficulty. By the end of 1979, the WSC disputes were resolved. Kallicharran was deposed after losing a six-match series one-nil in India and Lloyd returned as captain for a tour against a full-strength Australia (where the Windies won two-nil, with one draw) and New Zealand. The latter tour was full of controversy. New Zealand won the first Test at Dunedin by one wicket, but West Indies were never happy with the umpiring. West Indian discontent boiled over the next Test at Christchurch. While running into bowl, Colin Croft deliberately shouldered the umpire Fred Goodall. When Goodall went to talk to Lloyd about Croft's behaviour, he had to walk all the way to meet the West Indian captain, as the latter did not move an inch from his position at the slips. After tea on the third day, West Indies refused to take the field unless Goodall was removed. They were persuaded to continue, and it took intense negotiations between the two boards to keep the tour on track. The Kiwis won the three match series after the second and third Tests ended in draws. Nevertheless, the defeat proved to be the West Indies last Test series loss for the next 15 years.

== Dominance, rebels and blackwashes (1980s) ==
West Indies test series' in the 1980s
Location	Season	Opponent	Score (W–L–D)
Australia	1979–80	Australia	2–0–1
New Zealand	1979–80	New Zealand	0–1–2
England	1980	England	1–0–4
Pakistan	1980–81	Pakistan	1–0–3
West Indies	1980–81	England	2–0
Australia	1981–82	Australia	1–1–1
West Indies	1982–83	India	2–0–3
India	1983–84	India	3–0–3
West Indies	1983–84	Australia	3–0–2
England	1984	England	5–0
Australia	1984–85	Australia	3–1–1
West Indies	1984–85	New Zealand	2–0–2
West Indies	1985–86	England	5–0
Pakistan	1986–87	Pakistan	1–1–1
New Zealand	1986–87	New Zealand	1–1–1
India	1987–88	India	1–1–2
West Indies	1987–88	Pakistan	1–1–1
England	1988	England	4–0–1
Australia	1988–89	Australia	3–1–1
West Indies	1988–89	India	3–0–1
West Indies	1989–90	England	2–1–1
	1979–90		46–9–31

The 1980s started with a one-nil victory away to England over five Tests, one-nil away to Pakistan over four Tests, two-nil home to England over four Tests and a one-all draw away to Australia. Then in 1982–83, a West Indian rebel team toured apartheid South Africa. It was led by Lawrence Rowe and included prominent players like Alvin Kallicharran, Colin Croft, Collis King and Sylvester Clarke. WICB banned the players for life (which was later revoked), and some were refused entry back home. However, the rebels managed another tour the next year, which included most of the players of the original team. Despite this loss of talent, the official Windies side continued to dominate. During this time, the West Indies established themselves as one of Test cricket's all-time great sides, peaking perhaps on their tour of England in 1984, where they won the series 5–0, the only time in Test cricket history the touring side has whitewashed a five-test series. This was followed by a second "blackwash" against England at home in 1985–86. At the same time, the West Indies established the then-record of 11 consecutive Test victories, which was part of a still-standing record of 27 Tests without defeat. In the period from 1980 to 1985–86 they won 10 out of 11 Test series, the 1981–82 series in Australia being drawn 1–1. The West Indies' only notable defeat in this period was in the one-day arena, when, to general surprise, they lost to India in the final of the 1983 World Cup.

West Indian captain Lloyd retired from Test cricket at the end of the 1984–85 series against Australia. In total Lloyd had captained West Indies in 74 Test matches, winning 36 of them. Vivian Richards was Lloyd's successor, and continued the run of success. Meanwhile, a change of old guard was also happening. Joel Garner and Michael Holding had retired by 1987. A major find was Curtly Ambrose, who was as tall as Garner and equally effective with the ball. Courtney Walsh, who made his first appearance in 1984, bowled with an action that resembled Holding. Ian Bishop also had a similar action, and was as good a bowler till injuries interrupted his career. Patrick Patterson was faster than all the rest, but had a short career. Marshall still was the finest fast bowler in the world. But the batting was beginning to show signs of weakness, despite the presence of Richards, Greenidge and Desmond Haynes. West Indies failed to qualify for the semifinals of the 1987 World Cup. By the end of the 1980s, while still good were very beatable, they had lost the aura of invincibility that they had till the middle of the decade. Finding good replacements for senior players was again becoming a problem.

== Fall from grace (1990s–2000s) ==
During the early 1990s, the West Indies team was dealt a great blow with the retirement of its star players like Richards, Greenidge, Dujon and Marshall (who all retired after the away series against England in 1991), bringing an end of an era of strength. This left a youthful and inexperienced side. After Richards' retirement the only players with significant experience were Richie Richardson (who was appointed the new captain of the side), Desmond Haynes (who was soon dropped), Gus Logie (who was recalled), Courtney Walsh (who was now the leader of the West Indian pace attack) and Roger Harper (who came and went). However, this did not immediately affect their performance. Richie Richardson proved to be a decent successor to Richards. A new crop of young players emerged such as Brian Lara, Curtly Ambrose, Ian Bishop, Jimmy Adams, Carl Hooper, Phil Simmons, Keith Arthurton and Winston Benjamin. It was five more years before the West Indies lost a series, but they had a number of close shaves before then. Making a comeback to international cricket, South Africa played its first Test match in Bridgetown, a match which was attended by fewer than 10,000 people because of a boycott. Needing 201 to win on the last day, South Africa reached 123 for 2 before Ambrose and Walsh took the remaining 8 wickets for 25 runs. In 1992–93, the West Indies defeated Australia by one run in Adelaide, where a loss would have cost them the series. In 1994–95, the West Indies salvaged a draw in India when, after losing the first Test and drawing the second, they secured a win in the third. In 1992, the West Indies once again failed to qualify for the World Cup semi-finals.

Australia finally defeated the West Indies 2–1 in 1994–95 to become the unofficial world champions of Test cricket. The 1996 World Cup ended with a defeat in the semi-final, which forced Richie Richardson to end his career. The captaincy passed over to Courtney Walsh and then in 1998 to Brian Lara. The West Indies made their first ever official tour to South Africa in 1998–99. It was a disaster, starting with player revolts and ending with a 5–0 defeat. The 1999 World Cup campaign ended in the group stages. The next year, England won a series against the West Indies for the first time in thirty-one years. The West Indies ended the decade with another 5–0 defeat, this time in Australia.

For most of the 1990s, the West Indian batting lineup was dominated by Brian Lara. Lara became a regular in the side after the retirement of Viv Richards in 1991. In 1993–94, he scored 375 against England in Antigua, breaking Sobers' world record for the highest individual score in Test cricket. He continued his fine form playing for Warwickshire in the 1994 English County Championship, posting seven first-class hundreds in eight innings (including the Test match 375). The last of these was 501 not out against Durham, which improved upon Hanif Mohammad's thirty-five-year-old record as the highest score in first-class cricket. The West Indian bowling attack was spearheaded by Curtly Ambrose and Courtney Walsh, the latter setting a then world record of 519 wickets. However, these two had both retired by 2001, and their successors failed to maintain the high standards that Ambrose and Walsh had set. Despite the emergence of some good batsmen like Shivnarine Chanderpaul and Ramnaresh Sarwan, Brian Lara remained the crucial figure of the side.

After a 2–0 defeat by New Zealand in 1999–00, Lara was replaced as captain by Jimmy Adams, who initially enjoyed series wins against Zimbabwe and Pakistan. However, a 3–1 defeat by England and a 5–0 whitewash by Australia saw him replaced by Carl Hooper for the 2000–01 visit by South Africa. By the time Lara was restored to the captaincy in 2002–03, series had been lost to South Africa, Sri Lanka, Pakistan, New Zealand and India. The only series win of note was against India (although Zimbabwe and Bangladesh were also beaten) as the West Indies plummeted to eighth place in the world-rankings, below all the other established Test nations.

After losing the first series of his second captaincy period to world champions Australia, Lara secured success against Sri Lanka and Zimbabwe, before another poor run saw 3–0 defeats in 4-Test series against both South Africa and England. In the drawn fourth Test against England, Lara became the only man to regain the world record for highest individual Test score by scoring 400 not out, once again in Antigua, bettering Matthew Hayden's 380 against Zimbabwe the previous year. The West Indies were then whitewashed 4–0 in England. Lara's last act as captain was to win the 2004 ICC Champions Trophy, a one-day competition second only to the Cricket World Cup, at the Oval, London – a win that was a welcome surprise for the Caribbean which had just been hit by Hurricane Ivan.

=== Player, Board disputes ===
This joy was short-lived as a major dispute broke out in 2005 between the West Indian Players Association (WIPA) and the Cricket Board. The point of contention was clause 5 of the tour contract which gave WICB the sole and exclusive right to arrange for sponsorship, advertising, licensing, merchandising and promotional activities relating to WICB or any WICB Team. Digicel were the sponsors of the West Indian Team, while most of the players had contracts with Cable & Wireless. This conflict, coupled with a payment dispute meant that the West Indies initially announced a team absent Lara and a number of other leading West Indians for South Africa's visit in 2004–05, leading to Shivnarine Chanderpaul becoming captain. Some of these players did, in the end, compete. However, the dispute had not been resolved and rumbled on, leading to a second-string side being named for the tour of Sri Lanka in 2005. A resolution did not arise until October 2005, when a full-strength side was finally named for the 2005–06 tour of Australia. It was on this tour that Brian Lara overtook Australian Allan Border as the highest run-scorer in Test match cricket, despite the West Indies losing the series 3–0.

In 2009, another dispute erupted when many senior players decided not to take part over pay and contract issues. The WICB chose a second-string side to take part in a series against Bangladesh and the Champions Trophy. In 2012, ICC decided to get involved in order to resolve this long standing dispute.

In 2014, another dispute between WICB and West Indian Players Association (WIPA) led to the team's Indian tour being curtailed. The bone of contention was a protracted payment structure.

In 2015, Players has made themselves unavailable for tests, and with Jason Holder being thrust into the role of captaincy, and was met with much distrust between veteran bowlers and Holder and the administration and selectors. As a result, West Indies lost 21 matches by an innings since 1995–2015, when the team never lost more than 4 matches by over an innings combined from 1966 to 1995.

== Rebuilding and T20 success (2010s) ==
When Twenty20 cricket began to be contested full force beginning with the 2007 World Twenty20 in South Africa, the West Indies began to develop and realize an advantage of possessing and developing Richards-style batsmen who could devastate bowling attacks with power. As well, many West Indian batsmen put an emphasis on power to prepare for Twenty20 play as it offered them their most lucrative contracts. Foremost among the hard hitters was Chris Gayle, who both hit the first T20 international century and became the first to hit two.

At the 2012 World Twenty20 in Sri Lanka, the West Indies beat Australia in the semifinals and then beat the hosts by 32 runs to win their third ICC world championship and their first since Richards, Holding. and Lloyd had won the 1979 World Cup. In the 2016 World Twenty20, they beat host India in the semifinals after a successful chase and were still cheered back at their hotel by local and traveling fans as they advanced to face England in the final, which they won by four wickets after Carlos Brathwaite hit four consecutive sixes off Ben Stokes with 19 runs required off the final over. In contrast to being 8th in the ICC Test Rankings and 9th in the ICC ODI Rankings, the West Indies entered the match as second in the ICC T20 rankings behind India.

== Tournament history ==
=== World Cup ===
- 1975: Won
- 1979: Won
- 1983: Runners-up
- 1987: First round
- 1992: 6th place
- 1996: Semifinals
- 1999: First round
- 2003: First round
- 2007: 6th place
- 2011: Quarterfinals
- 2015: Quarterfinals
- 2019: 9th place
- 2023: Failed to qualify

=== ICC Champions Trophy/knockouts trophy ===
- 1998: runners up
- 2000: first round
- 2002: First round
- 2004: Won
- 2006: Runners-up
- 2009: Group stage
- 2013: Group stage
- 2017: failed to qualify(due to ICC rankings)
- 2025: failed to qualify(unable to participate in the 2023 cricket World Cup which was the qualification process for the tournament)

=== ICC World Twenty20/ICC Men's T20 World Cup ===
- 2007: First round
- 2009: Semifinals
- 2010: Super 8
- 2012: Won
- 2014: Semifinals
- 2016: Won
- 2021: Super 12
- 2022: Group Stage
- 2024: Super 8

=== ICC World Test Championship ===
- 2019–21: 8th place
- 2021–23: 8th place

== Bowling attack ==
The West Indies generally play fast bowlers more so than spin bowlers. The West Indian team at any one time will generally consist of four fast bowlers (as opposed to a mixture of fast and spin bowlers). They have on occasion played spin bowlers however, they tend to be batting All-Rounders. Examples include Gus Logie, Carl Hooper, etc. One famous example of their "four-pronged" pace attack (as it has been dubbed) was during the 1980s when the attack generally included :

- Malcolm Marshall (fast bowler)
- Andy Roberts (fast)
- Michael Holding (fast) and
- Joel Garner (fast).

Other pacemen surrounding that quartet included *Patrick Patterson (fast), *Colin Croft (fast) & *Sylvester Clarke (fast).

Their current attack includes:

- Kemar Roach (fast)
- Ravi Rampaul (fast medium) (now retired)
- Tino Best (fast) (now retired)
- Sheldon Cottrell (fast medium)
- Darren Sammy (medium fast) (now retired and recently hired by Cricket West Indies as Head Coach of the West Indies in Test , One Day Internationals and T20 International)
- Jason Holder (fast medium) and
- Dwayne Bravo (fast medium)

Other pacemen of this era include Andre Russell (fast), Miguel Cummins (fast medium), Fidel Edwards (fast), Krishmar Santokie (fast medium), Shannon Gabriel (fast), Lionel Baker (fast medium) Jerome Taylor (fast) and Oshane Thomas (fast).

== See also ==
- West Indian cricket team
- List of West Indian Test cricketers
- West Indian Test match records
- 2007 Cricket World Cup – held in the Caribbean.
- West Indian national cricket captains
- Fire in Babylon, a documentary about the West Indian cricket team during the 1970s and 1980s
- For coverage of cricket more generally, go to the.
