= Hines Johnson =

West Indian cricketer

- Hines Johnson in 1950

Personal information
- Full name: Hophnie Hobah Hines Johnson
- Born: 13 July 1910; Kingston, Jamaica
- Died: 24 June 1987 (aged 76); Miami, USA
- Height: 6 ft 3 in (1.91 m)
- Batting: Right-handed
- Bowling: Right-arm fast

International information
- National side: West Indies
- Test debut (cap 64): 27 March 1948 v England
- Last Test: 20 July 1950 v England

Career statistics
Competition	Test	First-class
Matches	3	28
Runs scored	38	316
Batting average	9.50	17.55
100s/50s	0/0	0/0
Top score	22	39*
Balls bowled	789	4,433
Wickets	13	68
Bowling average	18.30	23.36
5 wickets in innings	2	5
10 wickets in match	1	1
Best bowling	5/41	5/33
Catches/stumpings	0/–	13/–
- Source: CricInfo, 12 January 2020

Hophnie Hobah Hines Johnson (13 July 1910 – 24 June 1987) was a West Indian international cricketer. His first-class cricket career began with his debut for Jamaica in 1935 and lasted until 1951, interrupted by the Second World War. Making his international debut at the age of 37, his Test career lasted just three matches. All three were against England, and the last was in 1950. During his first Test Match, Johnson took five wickets in the first innings and five in the second. He was the first fast bowler to take ten wickets in a single Test for the West Indies, and held the record for best bowling figures by a West Indies player on debut until his 10/97 was bettered by spin bowler Alf Valentine. Johnson was 40 years old when he played his final Test.

== Career ==
Johnson made his first-class debut on 9 March 1935, at the age of 24, playing for Jamaica against the touring Marylebone Cricket Club. In a first-class career which lasted until 1952, he played 28 first-class matches, ten for Jamaica. Three of matches were Tests, and a further fifteen were representing the West Indies on tour outside international matches. He played six first-class matches between 1935 and 1939, all for Jamaica because organised cricket in the region was interrupted by the outbreak of the Second World War.

In 1947–48, the Marylebone Cricket Club under the captaincy of Gubby Allen toured the West Indies, and as England played four Tests against the West Indies. Though the West Indies used three different captains, they won the Test series 2–0 and outplayed England, prompting Norman Preston to comment in Wisden, "There was no question that West Indies deserved their triumph. On current form they must be the strongest cricketing body apart from Australia." As well as the captaincy changing hands, five different fast bowlers were used (not including two medium pace bowlers) each playing a single match, including Hines Johnson.

Johnson debuted in the fourth Test against England, with his team leading 1–0. When the match started on 27 March 1948, Johnson was 37 years old. Statistically he was the most successful of the West Indian fast bowlers who played in the series, taking five wickets in each innings to lay the foundations of victory in the final Test. His haul of 10 wickets for 97 runs marked the first time a fast bowler had taken ten wickets in a match for the West Indies. They were also the best bowling figures in a Test at Kingston, a record that was only broken in 2005. Only fifteen players have taken ten or more wickets in their first Test, and Hines was the first of two West Indians to achieve the feat. The other West Indian bowler was spinner Alf Valentine, who took 11 wickets on debut in 1950; Johnson also played in the match.

The West Indies toured India for five Tests in 1948–49, but Johnson was unable to play. Though the West Indies won the series 1–0 it was felt that a fast bowler of Johnson's calibre might have helped the West Indies turn the draws into victories. Johnson played the second and third Tests of his three-match international career during the West Indies' tour of England in 1950. The team's fast bowlers – Johnson, Prior Jones, and Lance Pierre – were expected to be the key to the team's fortunes, but spinners Alf Valentine and Sonny Ramadhin dominated the bowling, taking 59 wickets between them in the four-Test series. Under John Goddard's captaincy the West Indies fielded just one specialist opening bowler in each Test, with Johnson filling this role in the first and third matches, opening the bowling with first Gerry Gomez and then Frank Worrell. Injury prevented Johnson from bowling in the second innings of the first Test, and in the second match he was replaced by Jones. Johnson returned for the third Test, which proved to be the last of his career, shortly after his 40th birthday.

== Style ==
The Wisden report for Johnson's debut match recorded that "Johnson, standing 6 feet 3 inches, looked a truly great fast bowler. At no time did he attempt to intimidate the England batsmen by pitching short, but maintained a splendid pace, and by persistently keeping the ball well up the pitch compelled his opponents to make strokes."

== See also ==
- List of West Indies cricketers who have taken five-wicket hauls on Test debut
