= English cricket team in the West Indies in 1947–48 =

International cricket tour

The England national cricket team toured the West Indies from January to April 1948 and played four Test matches against the West Indies cricket team. The first two Tests were drawn and West Indies won the last two to take the series 2–0. England were captained by Gubby Allen, though Ken Cranston was stand-in skipper in the first Test. West Indies began with George Headley as captain but he was badly injured in the first Test and replaced for the rest of the series by John Goddard.

== Test series summary ==
=== First Test ===
21, 22, 23, 24, 26 January 1948
(5-day match)
Scorecard

West Indies	v	England
296 (124 overs); GE Gomez 86; JC Laker 7/103 (37 overs)		253 (110.2 overs); J Hardstaff 98; PEW Jones 4/54 (25.2 overs)
351/9d (106 overs); RJ Christiani 99; R Howorth 6/124 (41 overs)		86/4 (45.4 overs); JDB Robertson 51*; JDC Goddard 2/18 (14 overs)

Match drawn
Kensington Oval, Bridgetown, Barbados
Umpires: CS Foster and JH Walcott

- West Indies won the toss and elected to bat.
- 25 January was taken as a rest day.
- CL Walcott, ED Weekes, RJ Christiani, JDC Goddard, W Ferguson, PEW Jones and BBM Gaskin (all WIN), and W Place, D Brookes, GA Smithson, JC Laker and MF Tremlett (all ENG) made their Test debuts.

=== Second Test ===
11, 12, 13, 14, 16 February 1948
(5-day match)
Scorecard

England	v	West Indies
362 (143.3 overs); SC Griffith 140; W Ferguson 5/137 (39 overs)		497 (146 overs); AG Ganteaume 112; HJ Butler 3/122 (32 overs)
275 (113.2 overs); JDB Robertson 133; W Ferguson 6/92 (34.2 overs)		72/3 (16.2 overs); FMM Worrell 28*; HJ Butler 2/27 (8 overs)

Match drawn
Queen's Park Oval, Port of Spain, Trinidad
Umpires: V Guillen and GB Henderson

- England won the toss and elected to bat.
- 15 February was taken as a rest day.
- SC Griffith and JH Wardle (both ENG), and AG Ganteaume and FMM Worrell (both WIN) made their Test debuts.

=== Third Test ===
3, 4, 5, 6 March 1948
(5-day match)
Scorecard

West Indies	v	England
297/8d (105.4 overs); FMM Worrell 131*; K Cranston 4/78 (25 overs)		111 (50.2 overs); L Hutton 31; JDC Goddard 5/31 (14.2 overs)
78/3 (20 overs); CL Walcott 31*; JC Laker 2/34 (9 overs)		263 (f/o) (106.4 overs); J Hardstaff 63; W Ferguson 5/116 (40 overs)

West Indies won by 7 wickets
Bourda, Georgetown, British Guiana
Umpires: J Da Silva and ES Gillette

- West Indies won the toss and elected to bat.
- The match was scheduled for five days but completed in four.
- J Trim and LR Pierre (both WIN) made their Test debuts.

=== Fourth Test ===
27, 29, 30, 31 March, 1 April 1948
(5-day match)
Scorecard

England	v	West Indies
227 (128.5 overs); JDB Robertson 64; HHH Johnson 5/41 (34.5 overs)		490 (146.4 overs); ED Weekes 141; JC Laker 3/103 (36.4 overs)
336 (153 overs); W Place 107; HHH Johnson 5/55 (31 overs)		76/0 (11 overs); JDC Goddard 46*

West Indies won by 10 wickets
Sabina Park, Kingston, Jamaica
Umpires: SC Burke and TA Ewart

- England won the toss and elected to bat.
- 28 March was taken as a rest day.
- KR Rickards, HHH Johnson and ESM Kentish (all WIN) made their Test debuts.

== England squad ==
- Batsmen – Len Hutton, Jack Robertson, Joe Hardstaff junior, Dennis Brookes, Winston Place, Gerald Smithson
- Pace/seam bowlers – Gubby Allen (captain), Harold Butler, Maurice Tremlett
- Spinners – Jim Laker, Johnny Wardle
- All-rounders – Ken Cranston (vice-captain), Dick Howorth, Jack Ikin
- Wicketkeepers – Godfrey Evans, Billy Griffith

== Sources ==
- CricketArchive — tour summary
- Playfair Cricket Annual, 1st edition, 1948
- Wisden Online — 1948
- Wisden Cricketers' Almanack, 85th edition, 1948
