= West Indian cricket team in England in 1950 =

International cricket tour

	West Indies	England
- Dates: 6 May – 5 September 1950
Captains	John Goddard	Norman Yardley; Freddie Brown (4th Test only)

Test series
- Result: West Indies won the 4-match series 3–1
Most runs	Frank Worrell (539)	Len Hutton (333)
Most wickets	Alf Valentine (33)	Alec Bedser (11)

The West Indies cricket team toured England in the 1950 season to play a four-match Test series against England.

West Indies won the series 3–1 with no matches drawn. The second Test at Lord's was the first time that the West Indies had won a match in England; in that match Ramadhin took 5 wickets for 66 runs and 6 for 86, whilst Valentine took 4 for 48 and 3 for 79.

Wisden in 1951 named four West Indian players as Cricketer of the Year. They were Sonny Ramadhin, Alf Valentine, Everton Weekes and Frank Worrell. The fifth player was England wicket-keeper Godfrey Evans. For the source, see Wisden 1951 in Cricinfo.

== West Indies team ==
The following players were selected for the tour:

- John Goddard (captain) (Barbados)
- Robert Christiani (Guyana)
- Gerry Gomez (T&T)
- Hines Johnson (Jamaica)
- Prior Jones (T&T)
- Roy Marshall (Barbados)
- Lance Pierre (T&T)
- Allan Rae (Jamaica)
- Sonny Ramadhin (T&T)
- Jeff Stollmeyer (T&T)
- Kenneth Trestrail (T&T)
- Alf Valentine (Jamaica)
- Clyde Walcott (Barbados)
- Everton Weekes (Barbados)
- Cecil Williams (Barbados)
- Frank Worrell (Barbados)

Eleven of the sixteen players had already appeared in test cricket. Ramadhin and Valentine made their test debuts in this series. Marshall made his test debut in a later series. Trestrail and Williams never played test cricket.

== Test series summary ==
=== First Test ===
8–12 June 1950
(5-day match)
Scorecard

England	v	West Indies
312 (128.3 overs); TG Evans 104; AL Valentine 8/104 (50 overs)		215 (93.5 overs); ED Weekes 52; R Berry 5/63 (31.5 overs)
288 (141.5 overs); WJ Edrich 71; AL Valentine 3/100 (56 overs)		183 (81.2 overs); JB Stollmeyer 78; WE Hollies 5/63 (35.2 overs)

England won by 202 runs
Old Trafford, Manchester
Umpires: F Chester and D Davies

- England won the toss and elected to bat.
- 11 June was taken as a rest day.
- The match was scheduled for five days but completed in four.
- GHG Doggart and R Berry (both ENG), and S Ramadhin and AL Valentine (both WIN) made their Test debuts.

=== Second Test ===
24–29 June 1950
(5-day match)
Scorecard

West Indies	v	England
326 (131.2 overs); AF Rae 106 (274); RO Jenkins 5/116 (35.2 overs)		151 (106.4 overs); C Washbrook 36; S Ramadhin 5/66 (43 overs)
425/6d (178 overs); CL Walcott 168*; RO Jenkins 4/174 (59 overs)		274 (191.3 overs); C Washbrook 114; S Ramadhin 6/86 (72 overs)

West Indies won by 326 runs
Lord's, London
Umpires: D Davies and FS Lee

- West Indies won the toss and elected to bat.
- 25 June was taken as a rest day.
- WGA Parkhouse (ENG) made his Test debut.

=== Third Test ===
20–25 July 1950
(5-day match)
Scorecard

England	v	West Indies
223 (98.4 overs); D Shackleton 42; FMM Worrell 3/40 (17 overs)		558 (174.4 overs); FMM Worrell 261; AV Bedser 5/127 (48 overs)
436 (245.2 overs); C Washbrook 102; S Ramadhin 5/135 (81.2 overs)		103/0 (36.3 overs); JB Stollmeyer 52*

West Indies won by 10 wickets
Trent Bridge, Nottingham
Umpires: F Chester and H Elliott

- England won the toss and elected to bat.
- 23 July was taken as a rest day.
- DJ Insole and D Shackleton (both ENG) made their Test debuts.

=== Fourth Test ===
12–16 August 1950
(5-day match)
Scorecard

West Indies	v	England
503 (194.2 overs); FMM Worrell 138; DVP Wright 5/141 (53 overs)		344 (179.4 overs); L Hutton 202*; JDC Goddard 4/25 (17.4 overs)
		103 (f/o) (69.3 overs); DS Sheppard 29; AL Valentine 6/39 (26.3 overs)

West Indies won by an innings and 56 runs
The Oval, London
Umpires: WH Ashdown and FS Lee

- West Indies won the toss and elected to bat.
- 13 August was taken as a rest day.
- The match was scheduled for five days but completed in four.
- DS Sheppard, AJW McIntyre and MJ Hilton (all ENG) made their Test debuts.

== Sources ==
- CricketArchive and West Indies in England 1950
- Wisden 1951 and West Indies in England 1950
- Playfair Cricket Annual 1951
- Wisden Cricketers' Almanack 1951
- Michael Manley, A History Of West Indies Cricket, Andre Deutsch, 1988
