= List of West Indies cricketers who have taken five-wicket hauls on Test debut =

List of cricketers

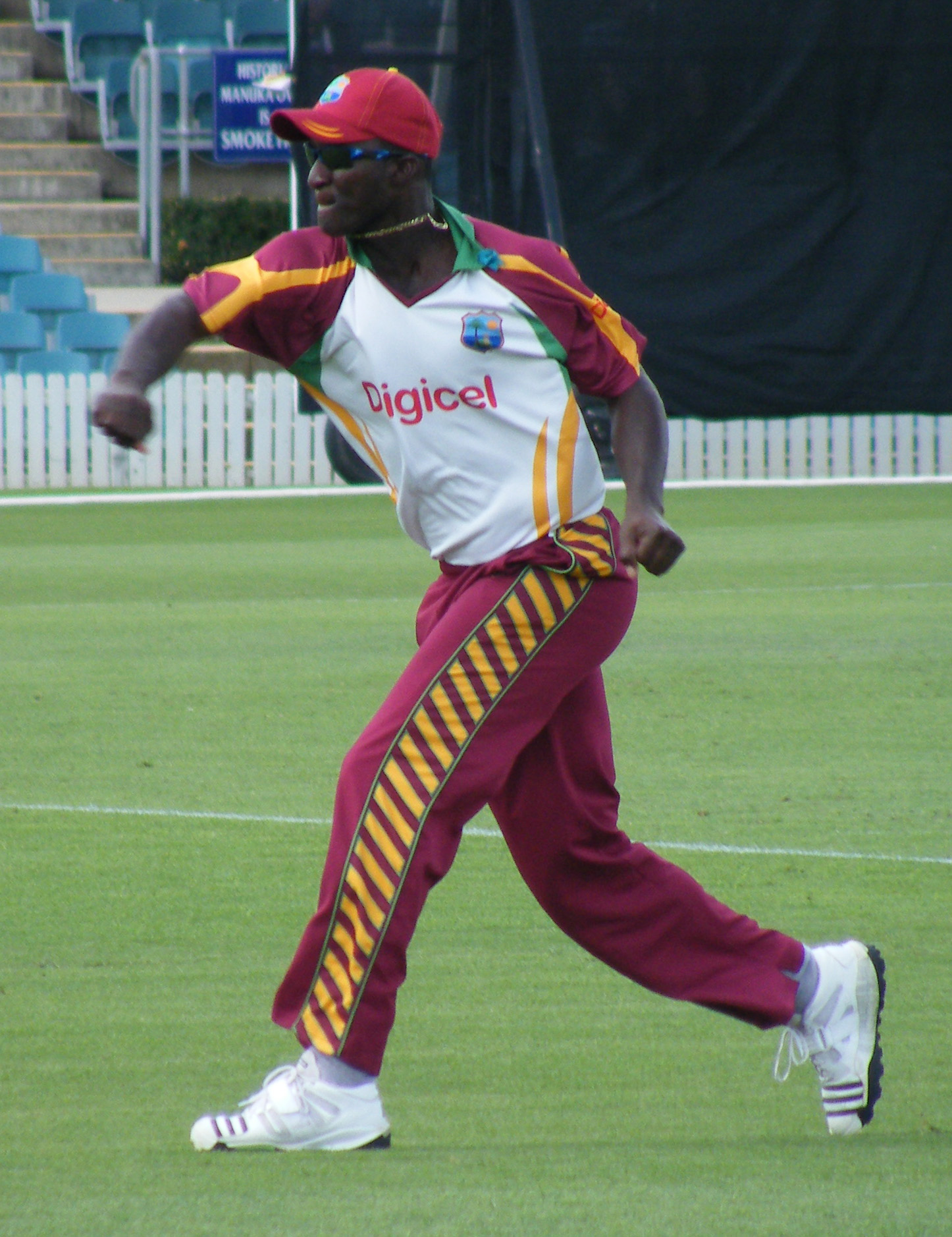
Darren Sammy took a five-wicket haul on Test debut in 2007.

In cricket, a five-wicket haul (also known as a "five-for" or "fifer") refers to a bowler taking five or more wickets in a single innings. This is regarded as a significant achievement. As of November 2026, 181 cricketers have taken a five-wicket haul on their debut in a Test match, with ten of them being taken by West Indian players. They have taken a five-wicket haul on debut against five opponents: four times against England, twice against India and Australia, and once against Pakistan and Sri Lanka each. Of the ten occasions, the West Indies won the match four times, and drew once. The players have taken five-wicket hauls at four venues, two in the West Indies and two overseas. The most common venue for a West Indies player to achieve the feat is Sabina Park in Kingston, Jamaica, where it has occurred five times. Of the overseas hauls, three occurred at Old Trafford in Manchester, England.

Hines Johnson was the first West Indian player to take a five-wicket haul on his Test debut, taking five wickets for 41 runs against England in 1948. Alf Valentine, Darren Sammy and Franklyn Rose took eight, seven and six wickets respectively, while six others have taken five wickets on their debut. Valentine took eight wickets for 104 runs, the best bowling figures by a West Indian bowler on debut, against England in 1950, at Old Trafford, Manchester. He accumulated 11 wickets for 204 runs in the match. Johnson and Valentine are the only West Indians to have taken ten wickets in a match on debut; Johnson is one of only nine bowlers to take two five-wicket hauls on debut. Amongst the bowlers, Johnson is the most economical, with 1.17 runs per over, and Sammy has the best strike rate. (Note: In cricket, a bowler's strike rate is the average number of deliveries bowled for each wicket.) As of 2024, the most recent bowler to achieve the feat was Shamar Joseph, taking five wickets for 94 runs in his debut Test, against Australia at the Adelaide Oval in January, 2024.

== Key ==
Key
Symbol	Meaning
Bowler	The bowler who took the five-wicket haul
‡	10 wickets or more taken in the match
†	The bowler was selected as man of the match
Date	Starting date of the Test match
Ground	The Test cricket ground where the match was played
Against	The team the bowler was playing against
Inn	The innings of the match in which the five-wicket haul was taken
Overs	Number of overs bowled in the innings
Runs	Runs conceded
Wkts	Number of wickets taken
Econ	Bowling economy rate (average runs per over)
Batsmen	The batsmen whose wickets were taken in the five-wicket haul
Result	The result for the West Indies team in that match

== Five-wicket hauls ==
Five-wicket hauls on Test debut by West Indian bowlers
No.	Bowler	Date	Ground	Against	Inn	Overs	Runs	Wkts	Econ	Batsmen	Result
1	Hines Johnson ‡	27 March 1948	Sabina Park, Kingston, Jamaica	England	1	34.5	41	5	1.17	Len Hutton; Jack Robertson; Ken Cranston; Jim Laker; Maurice Tremlett	Won
1	Hines Johnson ‡	27 March 1948	Sabina Park, Kingston, Jamaica	England	3	31.0	55	5	1.77	Jack Robertson; Joe Hardstaff Jr; Gubby Allen; Godfrey Evans; Maurice Tremlett	Won
2	Alf Valentine ‡	8 June 1950	Old Trafford, Manchester, England	England	1	50.0	104	8	2.08	Len Hutton; Reg Simpson; Bill Edrich; Hubert Doggart; Tom Dollery; Norman Yardley; Godfrey Evans; Jim Laker	Lost
3	Jaswick Taylor	26 March 1958	Queen's Park Oval, Port of Spain, Trinidad	Pakistan	2	36.5	109	5	2.95	Imtiaz Ahmed; Saeed Ahmed; Hanif Mohammad; Fazal Mahmood; Haseeb Ahsan	Lost
4	Lester King	13 April 1962	Sabina Park, Kingston, Jamaica	India	2	19.0	46	5	2.42	M. L. Jaisimha; Vijay Mehra; Salim Durani; Vijay Manjrekar; Chandu Borde	Won
5	John Shepherd	12 June 1969	Old Trafford, Manchester, England	England	1	58.5	104	5	1.76	Geoffrey Boycott; Basil D'Oliveira; Alan Knott; Barry Knight; John Snow	Lost
6	Franklyn Rose †	6 March 1997	Sabina Park, Kingston, Jamaica	India	2	33.0	100	6	3.03	V. V. S. Laxman; Rahul Dravid; Sachin Tendulkar; Sourav Ganguly; Mohammad Azharuddin; Abey Kuruvilla	Drawn
7	Nehemiah Perry	13 March 1999	Sabina Park, Kingston, Jamaica	Australia	3	26.0	70	5	2.69	Matthew Elliott; Justin Langer; Steve Waugh; Greg Blewett; Stuart MacGill	Won
8	Fidel Edwards	27 June 2003	Sabina Park, Kingston, Jamaica	Sri Lanka	1	15.4	36	5	2.29	Kumar Sangakkara; Mahela Jayawardene; Thilan Thushara; Muttiah Muralitharan; Prabath Nissanka	Won
9	Daren Sammy	7 June 2007	Old Trafford, Manchester, England	England	3	21.3	66	7	3.06	Michael Vaughan; Paul Collingwood; Ian Bell; Matt Prior; Liam Plunkett; Steve Harmison; Monty Panesar	Lost
10	Shamar Joseph	18 January 2024	Adelaide Oval, Adelaide, Australia	Australia	2	20	94	5	4.70	Steve Smith; Marnus Labuschagne; Cameron Green; Mitchell Starc; Nathan Lyon	Lost

== See also ==
- List of Test cricketers who have taken five wickets on debut
