= Wilfred Ferguson =

West Indian cricketer

Wilf Ferguson
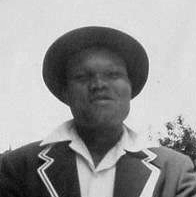

Personal information
- Born: 14 December 1917; Longdenville, Trinidad and Tobago
- Died: 23 February 1961 (aged 43); Port of Spain, Trinidad and Tobago
- Batting: Right-handed
- Bowling: Right-arm legbreak

International information
- National side: West Indies
- Test debut (cap 54): 21 January 1948 v England
- Last Test: 17 March 1954 v England

Career statistics
Competition	Test	First-class
Matches	8	49
Runs scored	200	1,225
Batting average	28.57	23.55
100s/50s	0/2	0/7
Top score	75	90
Balls bowled	2,568	10,504
Wickets	34	165
Bowling average	34.26	31.55
5 wickets in innings	3	11
10 wickets in match	1	2
Best bowling	6/92	7/73
Catches/stumpings	11/0	48/0
- Source: CricInfo, 7 January 2020

Wilfred Ferguson (14 December 1917 – 23 February 1961) was a West Indian cricketer who played in eight Tests from 1947–48 to 1953–54. He played first-class cricket for Trinidad from 1943 to 1956.

== Career ==
Ferguson was a leg-spin bowler and hard-hitting lower-order batsman. In his second first-class match for Trinidad in March 1944 he took 5 for 61 and 4 for 22, and made 60 batting at number nine, in an innings victory over British Guiana. A year later he took 5 for 137 and 6 for 60 in a drawn match against Barbados.

Ferguson was the leading bowler on either side during his debut Test series against England in 1947–48, playing in all four matches and taking 23 wickets at an average of 24.65. In the Second Test on the matting pitch at his home ground in Port of Spain, he took 11 wickets – match figures of 73.2–9–229–11. In Wisden Norman Preston commented that "no one looked as good as Ferguson, the stocky leg-break expert, who at times tossed his deliveries skilfully into the wind. His was a very fine performance ... on the easy-paced matting wicket." In the Fourth Test, batting at number nine, he meted out "drastic punishment" to the England bowlers, scoring 75 in 105 minutes. In his comments on the series, Preston noted that Ferguson "caused much merriment among the crowds when occasionally he removed his cap and revealed a bald head".

Handicapped by shoulder trouble, Ferguson was less successful on the tour of India in 1948–49, playing in three of the five Tests and taking 10 wickets at an average of 44.30. He took his best first-class figures of 7 for 73 in January 1950, when Trinidad beat Jamaica by an innings, but this was the match in which the young spinners Sonny Ramadhin and Alf Valentine made their impressive first-class debuts, and they were preferred to Ferguson when the team to tour England in 1950 was selected shortly afterwards.

Ferguson toured Australia and New Zealand in 1951–52, but although he took wickets in the tour matches he was unable to displace Ramadhin and Valentine from the Test team. In the match against Tasmania in Launceston he took 6 for 45 in the second innings, making use of a gale to deceive the batsmen with flight and spin. He played one final Test against England in 1953–54, having little success except for a brisk 44 opening the batting in the second innings when West Indies were looking for quick runs. Late on the last day, when the match was drifting towards a draw, Ferguson kept wicket, taking good catches standing up to the stumps to dismiss both opening batsmen.
