= International cricket in 1948–49 =

International cricket season

The 1948–49 international cricket season was from September 1948 to April 1949.

== Season overview ==
International tours
Start date	Home team	Away team	Results [Matches]			
Start date	Home team	Away team	Test	ODI	FC	LA
10 November 1948	India	West Indies	0–1 [5]	—	—	—
19 November 1948	Pakistan	West Indies	—	—	0–0 [2]	—
16 December 1948	South Africa	England	0–2 [5]	—	—	—
19 February 1949	Ceylon	West Indies	—	—	0–1 [2]	—
1 April 1949	Ceylon	Pakistan	—	—	0–2 [2]	—

== November ==
=== West Indies in India ===
Test series
No.	Date	Home captain	Away captain	Venue	Result
Test 304	10–14 November	Lala Amarnath	John Goddard	Feroz Shah Kotla Ground, Delhi	Match drawn
Test 305	9–13 December	Lala Amarnath	John Goddard	Brabourne Stadium, Bombay	Match drawn
Test 308	31 Dec–4 January	Lala Amarnath	John Goddard	Eden Gardens, Calcutta	Match drawn
Test 310	27–31 January	Lala Amarnath	John Goddard	Madras Cricket Club Ground, Madras	West Indies by an innings and 193 runs
Test 311	4–8 February	Lala Amarnath	John Goddard	Brabourne Stadium, Bombay	Match drawn

=== West Indies in Pakistan ===
Three-day match series
No.	Date	Home captain	Away captain	Venue	Result
Match 1	19–21 November	Anwar Hussain	Jeff Stollmeyer	Gymkhana Ground, Karachi	Match drawn
Match 2	26–29 November	Mohammad Saeed	John Goddard	Bagh-e-Jinnah, Lahore	Match drawn

== December ==
=== England in South Africa ===
Test series
No.	Date	Home captain	Away captain	Venue	Result
Test 306	16–20 December	Dudley Nourse	George Mann	Kingsmead, Durban	England by 2 wickets
Test 307	27–30 December	Dudley Nourse	George Mann	Ellis Park Stadium, Johannesburg	Match drawn
Test 309	1–5 January	Dudley Nourse	George Mann	Newlands, Cape Town	Match drawn
Test 312	12–16 February	Dudley Nourse	George Mann	Ellis Park Stadium, Johannesburg	Match drawn
Test 313	5–9 March	Dudley Nourse	George Mann	Crusaders Ground, Port Elizabeth	England by 3 wickets

== February ==
=== West Indies in Ceylon ===
Three-day match series
No.	Date	Home captain	Away captain	Venue	Result
Match 1	19–21 February	Fredrick de Saram	John Goddard	P Saravanamuttu Stadium, Colombo	West Indies by an innings and 22 runs
Match 2	26–28 February	Fredrick de Saram	John Goddard	P Saravanamuttu Stadium, Colombo	Match drawn

== April ==
=== Pakistan in Ceylon ===
Unofficial Test series
No.	Date	Home captain	Away captain	Venue	Result
Match 1	1–3 April	Fredrick de Saram	Mohammad Saeed	Colombo Oval, Colombo	Pakistan by an innings and 192 runs
Match 2	8–11 April	Fredrick de Saram	Mohammad Saeed	Colombo Oval, Colombo	Pakistan by 10 wickets
