= International cricket in 1950 =

International cricket season

The 1950 International cricket season was from April 1950 to August 1950.

== Season overview ==
International tours
Start date	Home team	Away team	Results [Matches]			
Start date	Home team	Away team	Test	ODI	FC	LA
8 June 1950	England	West Indies	3–1 [4]	—	—	—
12 August 1950	Netherlands	England	—	—	0–0 [2]	—

== June ==
=== West Indies in England ===
Test series
No.	Date	Home captain	Away captain	Venue	Result
Test 323	8–12 June	Norman Yardley	John Goddard	Old Trafford Cricket Ground, Manchester	England by 202 runs
Test 324	24–29 June	Norman Yardley	John Goddard	Lord's, London	West Indies by 326 runs
Test 325	20–25 July	Norman Yardley	John Goddard	Trent Bridge, Nottingham	West Indies by 10 wickets
Test 326	12–16 August	Freddie Brown	John Goddard	Kennington Oval, London	West Indies by an innings and 56 runs

== August ==
=== England in Netherlands ===
Two-day Match
No.	Date	Home captain	Away captain	Venue	Result
Match 1	12–13 August	Not mentioned	Not mentioned	VRA ground, Amsterdam	Match drawn
Match 2	26–27 August	Not mentioned	Not mentioned	Rood & Wit ground, Haarlem	Match drawn
