= Harold Walcott =

West Indian cricket umpire (died 1995)

Personal information
- Full name: J Harold Walcott
- Died: 30 April 1995; Christ Church, Barbados

Umpiring information
- Tests umpired: 4 (1948–1958)
- Source: Cricinfo, 17 July 2013

J. Harold Walcott (died 30 April 1995) was a West Indian cricket umpire. He stood in four Test matches between 1948 and 1958. He was the uncle of the West Indian cricketer Clyde Walcott.

== See also ==
- List of Test cricket umpires
