= International cricket in 1957 =

International cricket season

The 1957 International cricket season was from April 1957 to August 1957, which consisted only a single international tour.

== Season overview ==
International tours
Start date	Home team	Away team	Results [Matches]			
Start date	Home team	Away team	Test	ODI	FC	LA
30 May 1957	England	West Indies	3–0 [5]	—	—	—

== May ==
=== West Indies in England ===
Test series
No.	Date	Home captain	Away captain	Venue	Result
Test 439	30 May–4 June	Peter May	John Goddard	Edgbaston Cricket Ground, Birmingham	Match drawn
Test 440	20–22 June	Peter May	John Goddard	Lord's, London	England by an innings and 36 runs
Test 441	4–9 July	Peter May	John Goddard	Trent Bridge, Nottingham	Match drawn
Test 442	25–27 July	Peter May	John Goddard	Headingley Cricket Ground, Leeds	England by an innings and 5 runs
Test 443	22–24 August	Peter May	John Goddard	Kennington Oval, London	England by an innings and 237 runs
