= Godfrey Evans =

English cricketer

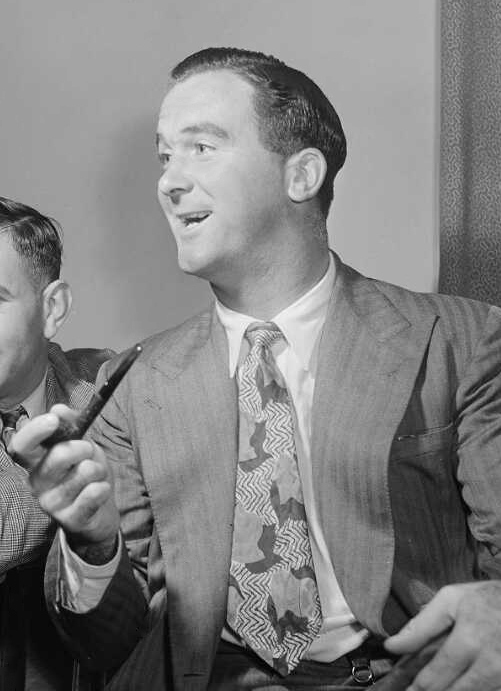
- Evans in 1951

Personal information
- Full name: Thomas Godfrey Evans
- Born: 18 August 1920; Finchley, Middlesex, England
- Died: 3 May 1999 (aged 78); Northampton, Northamptonshire, England
- Nickname: Godders
- Height: 5 ft 9 in (1.75 m)
- Batting: Right-handed
- Bowling: Right arm leg break
- Role: Wicket-keeper-Batsman

International information
- National side: England
- Test debut (cap 315): 17 August 1946 v India
- Last Test: 20 June 1959 v India

Domestic team information
- Years: Team
- 1939–1967: Kent

Career statistics
| Competition | Test | First-class |
|---|---|---|
| Matches | 91 | 465 |
| Runs scored | 2,439 | 14,882 |
| Batting average | 20.49 | 21.22 |
| 100s/50s | 2/8 | 7/62 |
| Top score | 104 | 144 |
| Balls bowled | 0 | 287 |
| Wickets | – | 2 |
| Bowling average | – | 122.50 |
| 5 wickets in innings | – | 0 |
| 10 wickets in match | – | 0 |
| Best bowling | – | 2/50 |
| Catches/stumpings | 173/46 | 816/250 |
- Source: CricInfo, 15 August 2022

Thomas Godfrey Evans CBE (18 August 1920 – 3 May 1999) was an English cricketer who played for Kent and England. Described by Wisden as 'arguably the best wicket-keeper the game has ever seen', Evans collected 219 dismissals in 91 Test match appearances between 1946 and 1959 and a total of 1066 in all first-class matches. En route he was the first wicket keeper to reach 200 Test dismissals and the first Englishman to reach both 1000 runs and 100 dismissals and 2000 runs and 200 dismissals in Test cricket. He was a Wisden Cricketer of the Year in 1951.

== Early career ==
As a teenager Godfrey Evans was a good all-round sportsman, gaining his colours and captaining the cricket, football and hockey teams at Kent College, Canterbury. He was also a very good boxer, winning all his amateur and professional fights, but at the age of 17 was forced by the Kent committee to choose between cricket and boxing. He worked on the ground staff at Dover in 1937, operating the scoreboard on the occasion that Kent made 219 runs in 71 minutes to beat Gloucestershire.

He made his Kent debut on 22 July 1939 against Surrey at Blackheath. He made 8 in the first innings as the match ended in a draw. World War II, during which he was in the Royal Army Service Corps, interrupted his career but a strong first season back in 1946 earned him a Test call-up.

== Test career ==
=== First Test and tour ===
Evans made his Test debut in 1946 against India, when he was chosen for the third Test at The Oval, replacing Paul Gibb. In a largely rain-affected contest he didn't bat nor take any dismissals.

Evans was selected as a member of Wally Hammond's side to tour Australia in 1946/47. After Gibb had played the first Test, Evans got his chance in the second at Melbourne. Australia won the match by an innings having scored 659/8 declared in their first innings, in 173 overs of English bowling Evans did not concede any byes, with Wisden commenting he 'kept wicket magnificently'. Evans did not concede a bye in Australia's first innings of 365 at Adelaide in the third Test either, this took the tally past 1,000 runs before he conceded his first bye in Ashes Tests. In the Fourth Test at Adelaide, Evans shared in a vital ninth wicket partnership with Denis Compton, England were in danger of losing the Test at 255/8 but Evans played a fine defensive innings, scoring 10 not out in 133 minutes, this enabled Compton to complete his second century of the match and Hammond the chance to declare. Evans took 97 minutes before scoring his first run, a Test record which stood until 1999 when beaten by Geoff Allott.

A short tour of New Zealand followed the Ashes series; rain heavily affected the only Test match, but in the Marylebone Cricket Club (MCC)'s tour match against Otago Evans completed his maiden first-class century. His innings of 101 came from 170 runs which were scored while he was at the wicket with Jack Ikin.

=== Ever present ===
In the 1947 home series with South Africa, Evans played in all five Tests scoring 209 runs at 41.80 and taking 14 dismissals. In the first Test at Trent Bridge he scored his maiden Test fifty with an innings of 74 that contained 14 fours. In the fifth Test at The Oval, Evans had scores of 45 and 39 not out, the second innings came in 29 minutes as England looked to score quick runs before a declaration.

England toured the West Indies in January 1948, Evans as first choice keeper played all four Tests scoring 128 runs at 18.28 and claiming seven victims. Of his series performance Wisden wrote: "Evans delighted the native crowds with his spectacular wicket-keeping, but as a batsman he accomplished little".

During the 1948 Ashes Evans was once again an ever-present, scoring 188 runs at 26.85 and taking 12 dismissals. His most notable act of the series were two missed stumpings as Australia successfully chased down, a Test record, 404 in the fourth Test at Headingley. The first chance occurred when Arthur Morris was on 32 (he would score 182), the second chance when Donald Bradman was on 108; he finished with 173 not out.

=== Drop and return ===
On the tour of South Africa in 1948/49 Evans was dropped after 22 consecutive Tests, a record sequence for a wicket-keeper at that time. He did play the first three Tests but after scoring 49 runs in five innings was replaced for the final two Tests by Billy Griffith. Evans regained his place in the team for the home series against New Zealand in 1949, in the four Test series which ended 0–0 Evans scored 61 runs in four innings and took 12 dismissals.

West Indies were the tourists in 1950, in the first Test at Old Trafford, Evans made his maiden Test century. He came to the wicket with England 88/5 in the first innings, but together with Trevor Bailey they recovered the innings with a partnership of 161 runs. Evans score of 104 contained 17 fours with Wisden commenting that he "neglected no opportunity to hit hard". In the third Test Evans added a fifty, his score of 68 coming from 83 added while he was at the wicket, the batting performance coming after he had conceded just two byes in West Indies' first innings total of 558. England lost the match by 10 wickets, a second successive defeat. A broken thumb stopped Evans from playing in the fourth Test of the series; his replacement, Arthur McIntyre, scored 4 and 0 as England sustained an innings defeat to lose the series 3–1.

=== Second Ashes tour ===
"Evans is a grand keeper. On this tour he proved that he is the outstanding keeper in the world today. I have never seen a better keeper than Tallon as he was in England in 1948 ... but that time has passed. Evans is now the world best. That's the way things go and the way we Australians are supposed to like it. Evans reminds me always of a fox terrier. He simply cannot stand still whilst on the cricket field. He moves with short, quick steps, dives, literally dives, at the ball when it is returned badly out of his reach ..." – Bill O'Reilly

Evans was back in the England team for the 1950/51 Ashes, although McIntyre did remain in the XI, as a specialist batsman, for the first Test. In the Brisbane match Evans took two noteworthy catches, the first from a Neil Harvey leg glance off the bowling of Alec Bedser, he moved so quickly to the leg side, that according to Neville Cardus, he made the catch look easy. The second dismissal was off the bowling of Freddie Brown, a Sam Loxton cut struck Evans on the gloves and rebounded forward, Evans dived headlong catching the ball inches above the ground. In the second Test at Melbourne, England were 126/7 in their first innings in response to Australia's 194. Evans, batting at nine, scored 49 which enabled a first innings lead although he failed in the second innings as England unsuccessfully chased 179. Australia won the next two Tests so arrived back at Melbourne for the fifth and final Test with the chance of completing a Whitewash, however this was averted with an eight wicket win by England. This was, at the fourteenth attempt, Evans's first time on the winning side in an Ashes Test. It also marked Australia's first post-war defeat in their 26th Test.

The end of series report in Wisden commented that: "Evans did not miss one Test catch, but he caught some which became chances only through lightning mental reaction plus acrobatic agility" commenting on his batting added: "Evans played one praiseworthy innings in the second Test but in others inability to curb his natural ebullience caused him to do less than justice to his talents."

The tour ended with a two Tests in New Zealand, Evans played both matches his most noteworthy act occurred in the second Test at Wellington where he conceded 30 byes in New Zealand's second innings total of 189. This was, and remained, the highest number of byes he conceded in a Test innings.

=== 1951 ===
At the start of the 1951 season Evans was chosen as one of the five Wisden Cricketers of the Year for his performances in the 1950 season, the other four recipients of the award – Sonny Ramadhin, Alf Valentine, Everton Weekes and Frank Worrell – were members of the victorious West Indian tourists.

The 1951 home Test series with South Africa proved to be a poor one for Evans, who was dropped for the final two Tests of the summer having scored just seven runs in the first three Tests. His keeping was not up to his usual standards either, in the South Africa second innings at Old Trafford he conceded 13 byes, significant in a low score of 191.

An MCC 'A' team toured India that winter and Evans was approached, however he declined the invitation believing that the constant cricket of the past five years had been the cause for his drop in form.

=== Batting at his best ===
Evans would play India the following year, as he returned to the Test team for the home series between the two countries. In the first Test at Leeds, Evans scored 66 in 97 minutes, a vital innings as England were 182/5 when Evans came to the wicket responding to India's 293. England won the match by seven wickets after India collapsed to 0/4 in their second innings. The second Test at Lord's was a significant match for Evans with bat and gloves. In India's first innings Evans took what Wisden described as a "brilliant stumping off a ball which had turned sharply towards the slips", the dismissal was Evans's 100th at Test level, he became the first English wicket-keeper to reach the landmark and the second keeper after Bert Oldfield. In England's response Evans scored his second Test century, scoring 104 in 135 minutes with 16 boundaries, his scoring was so quick that he nearly reached 100 in a session, he lunched on 98 not out. He shared a 159-run sixth wicket partnership with Tom Graveney as England scored quickly to build a 302-run first innings lead. England won the match by eight wickets despite Vinoo Mankad scoring 184 in the second innings.

Evans good batting form continued to the third Test at Old Trafford, where he passed 50 for a third successive Test innings. Again he demonstrated his quick scoring abilities with an innings of 71 in 78 minutes, the other England batsman were more cautious and the total progressed by only 84 while Evans was batting. England dismissed India for 58 and 82 to win the match and the series. The final Test at The Oval was a rain affected draw, Evans scored one to finish the series with an aggregate of 242 runs at 60.50, with the gloves he took eight dismissals.

=== Ashes success ===
In the first Test of the 1953 Ashes, Evans took two catches off the bowling of Trevor Bailey as Australia collapsed from 237/3 to 247 all out. In England's innings he scored eight runs batting at eight, as England totalled 144. The match was drawn after rain heavily disrupted the final two days. The second Test at Lord's was also drawn, England went into the final day on 20/3 but were able to bat through to the close losing just four further wickets, Evans came to the wicket after the fall of the sixth wicket with sixty-five minutes of play left, but together with Freddie Brown they batted out the final overs, Evans finished on 11 not out.

The third Test at Old Trafford followed the same course, ending in a draw after rain washed out the fourth day and much of the second, although it was an eventful match for Evans. In Australia's first innings he took three dismissals; however he dropped two earlier chances to dismiss Neil Harvey and Alan Davidson, the miss of Harvey was costly as he went on to make 122, having been 52 at the time. In England's innings, Evans scored a quick 44 not out in 39 minutes on what was at that stage a wet wicket. Evans took three further dismissals in Australia's second innings as they collapsed to 35/8. At Leeds, more rain and England's defensive batting ensured a fourth draw of the series. Batting first England scored 167 in 109.4 overs, Evans's contribution was 25 runs in 90 minutes. Three England players suffered injuries during the course of the innings; the third of these was Bailey who twisted his knee as he attempted to make his ground after a mix up with Evans. Facing a 99-run deficit, England continued to bat slowly in their second innings adding 275 in 177.3 overs, Bailey batted over four hours with the tail on the final day to leave Australia one hour and fifty-five minutes to chase 177; they were 30 short when play ended.

After four draws, the fifth and final Test at The Oval was the series decider. Australia, after winning the toss for the fifth time in the series, chose to bat first and scored 275, Evans taking four catches. England gained a first innings lead of 31; Evans innings of 28 included two hooked fours from a Ray Lindwall over. England took control of the match on the third day as the Australian batsmen struggled against spinners Tony Lock and Jim Laker and were dismissed for 162. England completed an eight-wicket victory the next day to win the Ashes, which Australia had held since 1934. Evans finished the series with 117 runs at 23.40 and 16 dismissals.

=== Retaining the Ashes ===
England toured the West Indies in 1953/54, after losing the first two Tests England came back to draw the series 2–2 with wins in the third and fifth Tests. Evans missed the fourth Test with an injury and was replaced by Dick Spooner, however Evans returned for the fifth Test where he played the longest innings of his career, batting 142 minutes for 28. Although not the largest innings of his career it was an important one as he shared a 108-run partnership with Len Hutton, whose double century built England a substantial first innings lead. Evans finished the series with 72 runs at 12.00 and six dismissals.

The tourists to England in 1954 were Pakistan, elected Test members two years previous they caused a shock by beating England in the final Test at The Oval to gain a series draw. In a wet summer all four Test matches were affected by rain. Evans highest two scores of the series – 25 and 31 – came in the first and third Tests, which were both drawn. In the fourth Test he was promoted to number six in the batting order as England omitted Trevor Bailey and chose five specialist bowlers. It proved unsuccessful as England collapsed chasing 168, Wisden noting England's 'tail proved far too long for a Test Match'. Evans scored 0 and 3 in his two innings, but by taking three catches he became the Test record holder for dismissals. A catch to take the wicket of Abdul Kardar was his 131st dismissal in Tests, taking him past the previous highest total of 130 by Bert Oldfield.

Evans made a third tour to Australia in 1954/55. He missed the first Test, after failing to recover from sunstroke. His deputy, Keith Andrew, came into the team to make his Test debut. Evans returned to the team for the second Test, but fared poorly with the bat scoring three and four. In the third Test at Melbourne he added some useful runs, in the first innings he scored 20 in a 54-run sixth wicket stand with Colin Cowdrey, in the second he added 22. He took five catches in the match including a leg-side one to dismiss Neil Harvey which began Australia's collapse from 77/2 to 111 all out. Neville Cardus described the catch: "Harvey flicked the seventh ball of the morning (from Tyson) round the corner and this time Evans dived full length to the right, clutching the ball in his out-stretched glove". In the fourth Test Evans made his highest score of the series, an innings of 37 in 36 minutes, sharing a 51-run partnership with Trevor Bailey. After Australia were dismissed for 111 in their second innings (for the second successive match), it set England a target of 94 to win the match. Evans came to the wicket with only four needed and with only one needed he scored a boundary that won the match and retained the Ashes. The fifth and final Test was disrupted by heavy rain in New South Wales which had also led to the Hunter Valley floods. The match was drawn after no play was possible until the fourth day, Evans scored 10 in England's innings and took two catches.

In the four Tests he played Evans scored 102 runs and took 13 catches. Wisden praised Evans, writing: "Always brimful of energy no matter how exhausting the heat of the day, he was an inspiration to the whole team and especially the bowlers."

=== Third Ashes success ===
After the Ashes there was a two Test series in New Zealand, Evans had a poor tour with the bat, scoring ducks in both Tests. In the intervening tour match with Wellington he also struggled, scoring one and a duck.

In 1955, South Africa toured England for a five Test series. Evans played the first three matches before an injury forced him to miss the final two. England won the first Test at Trent Bridge by an innings; Evans contributed 12 runs in England's innings and took two catches, the second was his 150th Test dismissal. In the second Test at Lord's Evans took seven dismissals, a record for his Test career. England won the match despite having trailed by 171 runs on first innings. During the third Test Evans fractured the little finger of his right hand in two places, Tom Graveney kept wicket in his absence. In England's second innings Evans, with hand in plaster, batted at number eleven and scored 36 runs including seven boundaries. He shared a 48-run partnership with Trevor Bailey that increased South Africa's target from 97 to 145. It proved in vain though as the tourists reached the required total with three wickets remaining.

Australia toured in 1956 and Evans was an ever present in the England side who won the Test series 2–1. Evans scored 115 runs at 19.16, three of his seven innings were ducks. His highest score came in the fourth Test at Old Trafford where he scored 47 in 29 minutes with five fours and two sixes. England won the match, and retained the Ashes, after Jim Laker's unprecedented 19 wickets. Evans took nine dismissals in the series but seven of these came in one match – the second Test.

=== Milestones ===
England toured South Africa in 1956/57. Evans played in all five Tests of a series that was drawn 2–2. In the second Test Evans scored 62 during England's first innings, he shared in a 93-run sixth wicket stand with Colin Cowdrey, it was the largest partnership of the match. Evans innings was his first Test score of more than fifty runs since 1952. When on four he reached a career total of 2,000 Test runs, only the second wicket-keeper after Les Ames to achieve the milestone. England led the series 2–1 but lost the final Test at Port Elizabeth in controversial circumstances. The match was played on a pitch that had been re-laid only three months previous, the wicket was slow and the ball kept 'exceptionally low' according to Wisden. The match produced a scoring rate of 1.40, the lowest ever in a Test match. Evans scored 21 in England's second innings but the tourists fell 58 runs short of their target. He also took six catches and in the difficult conditions conceded just one bye. Wisden commented that it was: "an extraordinary performance by an extraordinary man". Evans took a total of 20 dismissals in the series, a record for his career.

In 1957, the West Indies toured England for a five Test series. England dominated, winning 3–0 (all innings victories) and they were best placed in the two drawn matches. Evans played in all five Tests, scoring 201 runs and taking 15 dismissals. In the second Test at Lord's Evans scored 82 in 115 minutes, batting at number eight he shared a seventh wicket partnership of 174 in 115 minutes with Colin Cowdrey. The stand was an English record for the wicket and was the largest of Evans career. In the fourth Test at Headingley Evans didn't concede a bye and by catching Collie Smith claimed his 200th Test dismissal, becoming the first to reach the landmark.

New Zealand toured England in 1958, the hosts won the five Test series 4–0, with three of those victories by an innings. Evans was once again an ever present in the team but his batting was poor with 28 runs at an average 5.60. Nevertheless, he did break one record in the series, by playing the fifth Test at The Oval he made his 86th Test appearance passing the previous record held by Wally Hammond.

In the ICC Test Player Batting Rankings, he was:

- Highest Rating – 442 on 21 July 1952 (v India, Old Trafford, 3rd Test)
- Highest Ranking – 24th on 9 January 1951 (v Australia, Sydney, 3rd Test)

=== Final Tests ===
Evans made his fourth tour to Australia in 1958/59, but it was a disappointing one for him and the team. England went into the series as favourites, having won the previous three Ashes series, but lost convincingly 4–0. Evans played three Test matches, missing the third with a finger injury and, despite his returning for the fourth, a recurrence of that injury resulted in his missing the fifth. With the bat Evans scored 27 runs in six innings, four of which totalled only four runs. Wisden wrote that Evans was among several established players who showed a 'decline in power'.

In 1959, India toured England, in the first home series since the Ashes defeat a number of experienced players were dropped. However, Evans remained and in the first Test of the summer he justified his selection with a run-a-ball innings of 73, which contained 12 boundaries. Norman Preston in Wisden described it as 'daring hitting' which 'reduced the hitherto keen Indian bowling to a thing of shreds and patches'. In the second Test at Lord's Evans missed four stumpings off Tommy Greenhough in the space of a quarter of an hour, he otherwise kept well and didn't concede a bye in the match. Evans was dropped from the team for the next Test 'in the interests of team building', the reason given by the selectors. His England test cap number is 315.

== Records and statistics ==
| | | Batting | | | | Fielding | |
| Opposition | Matches | Runs | Average | High score | 100s/50s | Catches | Stumpings |
|---|---|---|---|---|---|---|---|
| Australia | 31 | 783 | 17.79 | 50 | 0/1 | 64 | 12 |
| India | 7 | 315 | 52.50 | 104 | 1/3 | 7 | 5 |
| New Zealand | 14 | 142 | 10.92 | 27 | 0/0 | 22 | 6 |
| Pakistan | 4 | 63 | 12.60 | 31 | 0/0 | 6 | 1 |
| South Africa | 19 | 511 | 18.25 | 74 | 0/2 | 46 | 13 |
| West Indies | 16 | 625 | 27.17 | 104 | 1/2 | 28 | 9 |
| Overall | 91 | 2,439 | 20.49 | 104 | 2/8 | 173 | 46 |

== After cricket ==
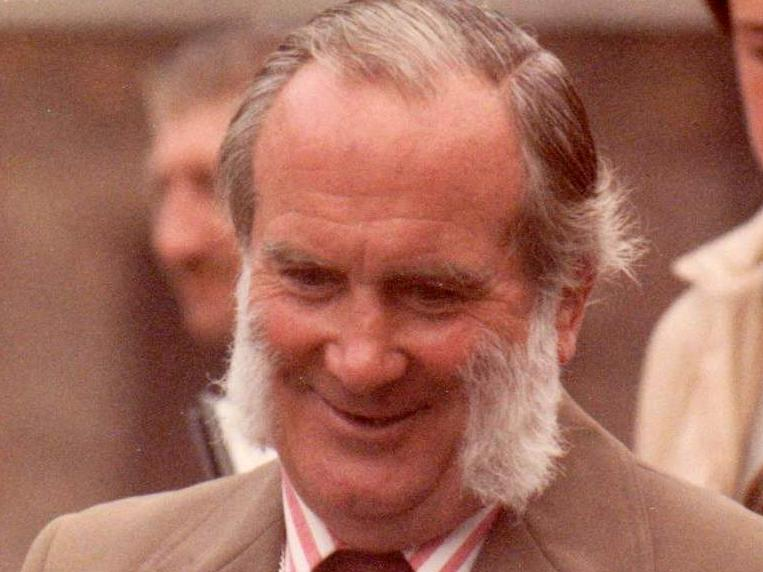
Evans at an England vs Australia veterans match at The Oval in 1980

After his retirement from professional cricket Evans ran the Jolly Drover pub at Hill Brow, Hampshire, then on the main A3 road, sporting the muttonchop whiskers he had admired in his grandfather. He published two memoirs: Behind the Stumps (1951) and The Gloves are Off (1960). The pub was adorned with cricketing photographs and Evans was always ready to reminisce about his cricketing days. He became a cricket expert for bookmakers Ladbrokes, famously offering odds of 500 to 1 on an England victory against Australia at Headingley in 1981, the match in which Ian Botham and Bob Willis fought back from following-on at 227 runs behind to achieve an improbable victory. Evans was also a commentator for ITV's coverage of Cricket during the late 1960s/early 1970s alongside Rex Alston.

Evans played himself in an episode of the television adaptation of the play Outside Edge.

He also appeared as himself along with Colin Cowdrey and Frank Tyson in the 1956 episode of Hancock's Half Hour titled "The Test Match".

Godfrey Evans died on 3 May 1999, survived by his wife, Angela, and a daughter Abigail (b. 1975), now Abigail Farndon.
