= Campbell Foster =

West Indian cricket umpire (1914–1978)

Personal information
- Full name: Campbell Seymore Foster
- Born: 2 November 1914; Barbados
- Died: 17 December 1978 (aged 64); Bridgetown, Barbados

Umpiring information
- Tests umpired: 1 (1948)
- Source: Cricinfo, 6 July 2013

Campbell Foster (2 November 1914 – 17 December 1978) was a West Indian cricket umpire. He stood in one Test match, West Indies vs. England, in 1948. He also played in two first-class matches for the Barbados cricket team in 1936/37 and 1937/38.

== See also ==
- List of Test cricket umpires
