= Robert Christiani =

West Indian cricketer

Personal information
- Born: 19 July 1920; Georgetown, British Guiana
- Died: 4 January 2005 (aged 84); Toronto, Canada
- Height: 5 ft 10 in (1.78 m)
- Batting: Right-handed
- Bowling: Right-arm offbreak

International information
- National side: West Indies
- Test debut (cap 53): 21 January 1948 v England
- Last Test: 24 February 1954 v England

Career statistics
Competition	Test	First-class
Matches	22	88
Runs scored	896	5,103
Batting average	26.35	40.50
100s/50s	1/4	12/27
Top score	107	181
Balls bowled	234	1,609
Wickets	3	18
Bowling average	36.00	60.44
5 wickets in innings	0	0
10 wickets in match	0	0
Best bowling	3/52	3/11
Catches/stumpings	19/2	96/12
- Source: CricInfo, 15 October 2020

Robert Julian Christiani (19 July 1920 – 4 January 2005) was a West Indian cricketer who played in 22 Tests from 1947–48 to 1953–54. At domestic level he played first-class cricket for British Guiana.

Christiani played his first Test in January 1948, playing against England; it was the West Indies first match since 1939 due to the interruption of the Second World War and he was one of seven debutantes fielded by the West Indies. Christiani was dismissed on 99, and is one of just three players in the history of Test cricket to have been dismissed one short of a century on debut. Christiani made his maiden Test century later that year, in November when the West Indies toured India. He was one of four people to reach three figures in the West Indies innings, at the time equalling the record set by England. It was the only time Christiani reached 100 in his 22-Test career.

At 5 foot 10 inches tall, Christiani was a skilled wicket-keeper, though only kept wicket once in Test matches. On that occasion he was a stand in for Clyde Walcott who was off the field with an injury; to underline his ability behind the stumps he affected two stumpings. According to Sir Everton Weekes, Christiani was a "very good team man, very unselfish and a very fine player who didn't use all the talent he had as well as he could have ... He was the type of batsman that would get into the 40s and wouldn't carry on." After the end of his playing career, Christiani emigrated to Canada. He settled in Toronto where he died in 2005. Christiani suffered from Alzheimer's disease. Three of Robert's brothers were also cricketers: Cyril, his elder brother, represented the West Indies in four Tests, while his two brothers (Harry and Bertie) followed in Robert's footsteps, playing for British Guiana.

Christiani also played field hockey and association football, representing British Guiana in the latter as a goalkeeper
