= Donald Weekes =

English cricketer (1930–2013)

Personal information
- Full name: Donald James Weekes
- Born: 8 May 1930; Horsham, Sussex, England
- Died: 24 September 2013 (aged 83); Bromley, London, England
- Batting: Right-handed
- Bowling: Right-arm fast
- Relatives: Everton Weekes (uncle); Leonard Bates (father-in-law)

Domestic team information
- Years: Team
- 1952: Sussex

Career statistics
Competition	First-class
Matches	1
Runs scored	0
Batting average	0.00
100s/50s	–/–
Top score	0
Balls bowled	36
Wickets	–
Bowling average	–
5 wickets in innings	–
10 wickets in match	–
Best bowling	–
Catches/stumpings	–/–
- Source: Cricinfo, 27 November 2011

Donald James Weekes (8 May 1930 – 24 September 2013) was an English cricketer. Weekes was a right-handed batsman who bowled right-arm fast. He was born at Horsham, Sussex.

Weekes made a single first-class appearance for Sussex against Oxford University at University Parks, Oxford in 1952. In a drawn match, he bowled a total of six wicketless overs, while in his only batting innings he was dismissed for a duck by Henry Joynt. This was his only major appearance for Sussex.

His uncle was the West Indian Test cricketer Sir Everton Weekes, while his father-in-law, Leonard Bates, played first-class cricket for Warwickshire.

Donald Weekes died in Bromley, London on 24 September 2013, at the age of 83.
