= West Indian =

Native or inhabitant of the West Indies

A West Indian is a native or inhabitant of the West Indies (the Antilles and the Lucayan Archipelago). According to the Oxford English Dictionary (OED), the term West Indian in 1597 described the indigenous inhabitants of the West Indies, by 1661 the term defined "an inhabitant or native of the West Indies, of European origin or descent." In the 1950s, coinciding with decolonization and the arrival of Afro-Caribbean migrants in the United Kingdom, West Indian referred to those who were of African descent. Inclusively, in 1961 all inhabitants of the West Indies Federation were termed West Indian regardless of their descent, besides West Indian Indo-Caribbean people, who were sometimes referred to, rather confusingly, as East Indian West Indian. The OED now defines it simply as a citizen of any West Indies nation. Some West Indian people reserve this term for citizens or natives of the British West Indies only, to the exclusion of not just the Hispanophones, but also French and Dutch West Indians.

== See also ==
- Caribbean people
- History of colonialism
- History of the West Indian cricket team
- Spanish colonization of the Americas
- West Indian American
