= J. Da Silva =

West Indian cricket umpire

Umpiring information
- Tests umpired: 1 (1948)
- Source: Cricinfo, 5 July 2013

J. Da Silva is a former West Indian cricket umpire. He stood in one Test match, West Indies vs. England, in 1948.

== See also ==
- List of Test cricket umpires
