= Prior Jones =

West Indian cricketer (1917–1991)

- Jones in 1950

Personal information
- Full name: Prior Erskine Waverley Jones
- Born: 6 June 1917; Princes Town, Trinidad
- Died: 21 November 1991 (aged 74); Port of Spain, Trinidad
- Batting: Right-handed
- Bowling: Right-arm fast

International information
- National side: West Indies
- Test debut (cap 57): 21 January 1948 v England
- Last Test: 30 November 1951 v Australia

Domestic team information
- Years: Team
- 1940/41–1950/51: Trinidad

Career statistics
Competition	Test	First-class
Matches	9	61
Runs scored	47	775
Batting average	5.22	14.09
100s/50s	0/0	0/1
Top score	10*	60*
Balls bowled	1,842	1,842
Wickets	25	169
Bowling average	30.03	26.81
5 wickets in innings	1	6
10 wickets in match	0	1
Best bowling	5/85	7/29
Catches/stumpings	4/–	33/–
- Source: Cricinfo, 11 August 2016

Prior Erskine Waverley Jones (6 June 1917 – 21 November 1991) was a West Indian cricketer who played in nine Test matches from 1947–48 to 1951–52.

A fast bowler, Jones played first-class cricket for Trinidad from 1940–41 to 1950–51. He toured India with the West Indian team in 1948–49, England in 1950, and played his last first-class matches on the tour to Australia and New Zealand in 1951–52. His best Test figures were 5 for 85 against India at Bombay in 1948–49. His best first-class figures were 7 for 29 against Yorkshire in 1950; and his best match figures were 10 for 62 (4 for 39 and 6 for 23) against Ceylon in 1948–49.

Jones also captained Trinidad at soccer.
