= Jeff Stollmeyer =

West Indian cricketer (1921–1989)

Jeffrey Stollmeyer
Personal information
- Born: 11 March 1921; Santa Cruz, Trinidad
- Died: 10 September 1989 (aged 68); Melbourne, Florida, United States
- Batting: Right-handed
- Bowling: Legbreak, googly

International information
- National side: West Indies
- Test debut (cap 47): 23 June 1939 v England
- Last Test: 26 April 1955 v Australia

Career statistics
Competition	Tests	First-class
Matches	32	117
Runs scored	2,159	7,942
Batting average	42.33	44.61
100s/50s	4/12	14/38
Top score	160	324
Balls bowled	990	4,413
Wickets	13	55
Bowling average	39.00	45.12
5 wickets in innings	0	0
10 wickets in match	0	0
Best bowling	3/32	3/32
Catches/stumpings	20/0	92/0
- Source: CricInfo, 30 May 2019

Jeffrey Baxter Stollmeyer (11 March 1921 – 10 September 1989) was a Trinidad and Tobago cricketer who played as an opening batsman. He played 32 Test matches for the West Indies, captaining 13 of these. He was also a senator.

== Early life ==
Stollmeyer was born in Santa Cruz, Trinidad and Tobago.

== Career ==
=== Cricket ===
Described as "tall and graceful with a good range of strokes marked especially by the drive" by Wisden, he played in his first Test at the age of eighteen and made a 59 in his debut innings at Lord's. He also had a famous opening partnership alongside Jamaican batsman Allan Rae with the duo averaging a lofty 71 in their 13 tests as a pair. Stollmeyer gained the captaincy during the 1951–52 tour of Australia after John Goddard stood down in that series. He retained the captaincy during the West Indies' next three series, all of which were played at home.

=== Post-playing career ===
After his playing career, Stollmeyer had a long and distinguished career in cricket administration. He served as President of the West Indies Board of Control from 1974 until 1981, a tenure distinguished by his opposition to Kerry Packer's World Series Cricket. In 1979 he was awarded Trinidad and Tobago's Chaconia Medal (Gold). Stollmeyer released his autobiography Everything Under the Sun in 1983.

== Legacy ==
In June 1988 Stollmeyer was celebrated on the $2.50 Trinidad and Tobago stamp alongside the Barbados Cricket Buckle.

== Personal life ==
Stollmeyer died on 10 September 1989 in a hospital in Melbourne, Florida, after suffering wounds from home invaders in his home in Port-of-Spain.

Stollmeyer's older brother Vic also played Test cricket for the West Indies while another brother, Hugh was one of Trinidad's great painters who influenced the Caribbean art movement. Stollmeyer's nephew John is a former footballer who played 31 games for the United States.

== See also ==
- List of cricketers who were murdered

Preceded by John Goddard	West Indies Test cricket captains 1951/2 – 1954/5	Succeeded by Denis Atkinson
