= Lance Pierre =

West Indian cricketer

- Lance Pierre in 1950

Personal information
- Born: 5 June 1921; Port of Spain, Trinidad and Tobago
- Died: 4 January 1989 (aged 67); Port of Spain, Trinidad and Tobago
- Batting: Right-handed
- Bowling: Right-arm fast-medium

International information
- National side: West Indies
- Only Test (cap 62): 3 March 1948 v England

Career statistics
Competition	Test	First-class
Matches	1	35
Runs scored	–	131
Batting average	–	6.23
100s/50s	–	0/0
Top score	–	23
Balls bowled	42	5,047
Wickets	0	102
Bowling average	–	24.72
5 wickets in innings	–	4
10 wickets in match	–	0
Best bowling	–	8/51
Catches/stumpings	0/–	14/–
- Source: CricInfo, 9 March 2021

Lancelot Richard Pierre (5 June 1921 – 14 April 1989) was a West Indian cricketer who played in one Test match in 1948.

== Career ==
Pierre was a fast bowler who played for Trinidad from 1940–41 to 1949–50. He played in the Third Test in Georgetown in 1947–48 against England, which the West Indies won, although Pierre did not bat or take a wicket. He toured England in 1950, taking his best first-class figures of 8 for 51 against Lancashire.
