= Alf Valentine =

West Indian cricketer

Personal information
- Full name: Alfred Louis Valentine
- Born: 28 April 1930; Kingston, Jamaica
- Died: 11 May 2004 (aged 74); Orlando, Florida, United States
- Batting: Right-handed
- Bowling: Slow left-arm
- Role: Bowler

International information
- National side: West Indies
- Test debut (cap 71): 8 June 1950 v England
- Last Test: 18 April 1962 v India

Career statistics
| Competition | Test | First-class |
|---|---|---|
| Matches | 36 | 125 |
| Runs scored | 141 | 470 |
| Batting average | 4.70 | 5.00 |
| 100s/50s | 0/0 | 0/0 |
| Top score | 14 | 24* |
| Balls bowled | 12,953 | 33,828 |
| Wickets | 139 | 475 |
| Bowling average | 30.32 | 26.21 |
| 5 wickets in innings | 8 | 32 |
| 10 wickets in match | 2 | 6 |
| Best bowling | 8/104 | 8/26 |
| Catches/stumpings | 13/– | 45/– |
- Source: CricInfo, 7 January 2020

Alfred Louis Valentine (28 April 1930 – 11 May 2004) was a West Indian cricketer in the 1950s and 1960s. He is most famous for his performance in the West Indies' 1950 tour of England, which was immortalised in the Victory Calypso.

== The 1950 tour ==
The West Indies toured England in 1950. They had a good batting line-up including the "three W's" (Clyde Walcott, Everton Weekes and Frank Worrell), but they were unusually short of bowlers. They took two young spinners, 20-year-old Alf Valentine and 21-year-old Sonny Ramadhin, who had only played two first-class matches each. Valentine in particular was a surprising choice as he had only taken two wickets in those matches at an average of 95, but somehow he had caught the eye of the West Indies captain, John Goddard.

Valentine did not impress in the first few matches of the tour, and was not certain to be in the Test team, until he took 8 for 26 and 5 for 41 in the final warm-up match before the Tests. The West Indies beat Lancashire by an innings and 220 runs.

He justified his selection for the Test side when in the first innings of the first Test, he took the first eight wickets, five of them before lunch on the first day. He finished with 8 for 104 in the innings, and 11 for 204 in the match off 106 overs. He was the first bowler ever to take eight wickets in his first Test innings, a feat which has only been achieved three times since as of December 2012.

England won that match, but in the second Test, at Lord's, the West Indies recorded a 326-run victory, thanks to Clyde Walcott's 168 not out in the second innings, and to the bowling of Ramadhin (11 for 152) and Valentine (7 for 127). This was West Indies' first ever Test victory in England, and it was commemorated in the famous Victory Calypso:

Second Test and West Indies won
With those two little pals of mine
Ramadhin and Valentine

The West Indies' success continued as they won the third and fourth Tests to record a series victory, Valentine taking five wickets in the third Test and ten wickets in the fourth Test. He bowled 92 overs in the second innings of the third Test, then a Test record. In all, Valentine took 33 wickets in the series at an average of 20.42. He bowled a massive 422.5 overs, conceding only 1.59 runs per over.

In the tour as a whole, Valentine bowled 1185.2 overs in 21 matches. He took 123 wickets at an average of only 17.94, conceding only 1.86 runs per over. He took five wickets in an innings ten times, including an analysis of 13.2-9-6-5 against Kent. With this record, it was no surprise when he was chosen as one of the Wisden Cricketers of the Year in 1951.

== Later career ==
Valentine's career never quite reached the spectacular heights of the 1950 tour again. In purely statistical terms, the 1950 warm-up match against Lancashire was his career-best first-class match, and his first Test was his career-best Test match. In the West Indies' next Test series, in Australia in 1951–52, he took 24 wickets in five matches; and when India visited the West Indies in 1953, he took 28 wickets, again in five matches. In 1954 he became the first West Indian to reach 100 Test wickets, in only his 19th Test. But in his last 20 Test matches, from 1954 to 1962, he only took 46 wickets at an average of 40.63. He was still an effective containing bowler, conceding only 2.06 runs per over in those later years, but he didn't have the attacking effectiveness of his dramatic debut. On the 1957 tour of England he suffered a complete loss of confidence.

After his last Test, he served as the national coach of Jamaica.

== Personal ==
Born in Kingston, Jamaica, Valentine was married twice. He had four daughters with his first wife, Gwendolyn, who died. He moved to Florida with his second wife, Jacquelyn, where they fostered dozens of children whose parents were in prison. He died in Orlando, Florida in 2004, aged 74.

== See also ==
- West Indian cricket team
- Victory Calypso
- List of West Indies cricketers who have taken five-wicket hauls on Test debut
