= Clyde Walcott =

West Indian Test cricketer

Sir Clyde Walcott OBE KA GCM
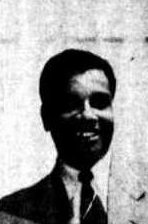

Personal information
- Full name: Clyde Leopold Walcott
- Born: 17 January 1926; Saint Michael, Barbados
- Died: 26 August 2006 (aged 80); Barbados
- Height: 6 ft 2 in (1.88 m)
- Batting: Right-handed
- Bowling: Right-arm fast-medium
- Role: Wicket-keeper

International information
- National side: West Indies
- Test debut (cap 58): 21 January 1948 v England
- Last Test: 31 March 1960 v England

Domestic team information
- Years: Team
- 1941–1956: Barbados
- 1954–1964: British Guiana

Career statistics
Competition	Test	First-class
Matches	44	146
Runs scored	3,798	11,820
Batting average	56.68	56.55
100s/50s	15/14	40/54
Top score	220	314*
Balls bowled	1,194	3,487
Wickets	11	35
Bowling average	37.09	36.25
5 wickets in innings	0	1
10 wickets in match	0	0
Best bowling	3/50	5/41
Catches/stumpings	53/11	174/33
Medal record
Men's Cricket
Representing West Indies as Manager
ICC Cricket World Cup
Winner	1975 England
Winner	1979 England
- Source: CricketArchive, 8 January 2009

Clyde Walcott

2nd President of International Cricket Council
- In office 1993 - 1997
- Preceded by: Colin Cowdrey
- Succeeded by: Jagmohan Dalmiya

Sir Clyde Leopold Walcott OBE KA GCM (17 January 1926 – 26 August 2006) was a West Indian cricketer. Walcott was a member of the "three W's", the other two being Everton Weekes and Frank Worrell: all were very successful batsmen from Barbados, born within a short distance of each other in Bridgetown, Barbados in a period of 18 months from August 1924 to January 1926; all made their Test cricket debut against England in 1948. In the mid-1950s, Walcott was arguably the best batsman in the world. He was the manager of the West Indian squads which won the 1975 Cricket World Cup and the 1979 Cricket World Cup. In later life, he had an active career as a cricket administrator, and was the first non-English and non-white chairman of the International Cricket Council.

== Early and private life ==
Walcott was born in New Orleans (Bridgetown), St. Michael, Barbados. His father was a printing engineer with the Barbados Advocate newspaper. He was educated at Combermere School and, from the age of 14, at Harrison College in Barbados. He took up wicket-keeping at Harrison College and also learned to bowl inswingers.

He married Muriel Ashby in 1951. They had two sons together. His brother, Keith Walcott, and a son, Michael Walcott, both played first-class cricket for Barbados.

== Cricketing career ==
Walcott first played first-class cricket for Barbados in 1942, as a 16-year-old schoolboy. He made his first impression in February 1946, when, on a matting wicket, he scored 314 not out for Barbados against Trinidad as part of an unbroken stand of 574 for the fourth wicket with schoolfriend Frank Worrell (255 not out), setting a world record for any partnership in first-class cricket that remains a record in the West Indies.

He played his first Test in January 1948, the drawn 1st Test against England at Bridgetown. Powerfully built, weighing 15 stone and 6"2' tall, he was an accomplished strokeplayer. From a crouched stance, he was particularly strong off the back foot, and quick to cut, drive or pull. Despite his height, Walcott also kept wicket for his country in his first 15 Tests, his versatility enabling to retain his position in the side despite some poor batting performances in his first few matches. By the time a back injury forced him to relinquish the gloves, his batting had improved sufficiently to enable him to keep his place. He became a good slip fielder, and was an occasional fast-medium bowler.

In 1950, his unbeaten 168 in the second innings of the 2nd Test at Lord's helped the team to its first Test victory, and ultimately first series win in England, assisted by the spin bowling of Sonny Ramadhin and Alf Valentine. He scored a century in both innings of two Tests in the series against Australia in 1955, when he became the first batsman to score five centuries in a single Test series, totalling 827 runs from 10 innings. He was dismissed for a duck only once in Tests, lbw to Ray Lindwall in the 1st Test against Australia at Brisbane in 1951.

He played for Enfield in the Lancashire League from 1951 to 1954, and moved to Georgetown in Guyana (then British Guiana) in 1954, to work for the British Guiana Sugar Producers' Association. He also played first-class cricket for British Guiana, and by 1956 he was captaining the side. In retirement, he returned to Barbados in 1970.

He was a Wisden Cricketer of the Year in 1958.

== Cricket and Social Welfare Organiser ==
Between 1954 and 1970, and largely in parallel with his cricketing career, Walcott had an influential role with the Sugar Producers' Association in Guyana as a cricket and social welfare organiser on the country's vast sugar estates. In those roles he engineered huge strides in the development of cricket among poor, mainly Indo-Guyanese plantation workers, widening access to the game, upgrading facilities, organising clubs and competitions and improving coaching techniques.

This led directly to the emergence of a number of world-class Indo-Guyanese cricketers – including Rohan Kanhai and Joe Solomon – from an area of the Caribbean that had hitherto been unknown and overlooked as a source of talent.

Walcott's biographer, Peter Mason, argues in Clyde Walcott: Statesman of West Indies Cricket that his work in British Guiana "revitalised the colony’s fortunes in the regional game, while helping to develop an array of brilliant new Guyanese players who became the backbone of West Indies success for years to come".

Simultaneously, says Mason, "he stimulated new self-worth and a more tangible Caribbean identity among the Indian population of the sugar estates on which he worked", while also doing much to enhance living and working conditions as part of the Sugar Producers' Association’s long-running programme of improvements.

== Retirement ==
Walcott retired from playing Test cricket in 1960. His early retirement from international cricket was attributed by many to his dissatisfaction with West Indian cricket politics relating to the captaincy, but he himself attributed it to disputes over pay. He retired from first-class cricket in 1964. He was awarded the OBE in 1966 for services to cricket in Barbados, Guyana and the West Indies.

In retirement, he had an active career as a cricket administrator. He managed and coached various cricket teams, and was later a cricket commentator in Barbados. He was President of the Guyana Cricket Board of Control from 1968 to 1970, and then a vice-president of the Barbados Cricket Association. He was chairman of the West Indies selectors from 1973 to 1988, and managed the West Indies teams that won the Cricket World Cup in 1975 and 1979, and also in 1987. He was president of the West Indies Cricket Board from 1988 to 1993. He was awarded the Barbados Gold Crown of Merit in 1991, and became a Knight of St Andrew in the Order of Barbados in 1993.

He ended his career at the ICC. He was an International Cricket Council match referee in three matches in 1992, and became chairman of the International Cricket Council from 1993, the first non-English person and the first black man to hold the position. He was knighted for services to cricket in 1994. Both of the other two "Ws" were also knighted, Weekes in 1995 and Worrell in 1964, only three years before his early death. He became the ICC Cricket Chairman in 1997, in charge of the ICC Code of Conduct, and oversaw investigations into allegations of match fixing. He retired in 2000.

When Arsenal footballer Theo Walcott was first selected for the England football team in 2006, there were rumors that Sir Clyde was his great uncle. In an article in The Sunday Telegraph, Sir Clyde said "he's definitely not a relative".

He published two autobiographies, Island Cricketers in 1958 and Sixty Years on the Back Foot in 1999. After Walcott's death, Michael Holding, the former West Indian fast bowler who made his debut when Walcott was manager, said: "Another good man gone – he is not only a West Indies legend but a legend of the world."

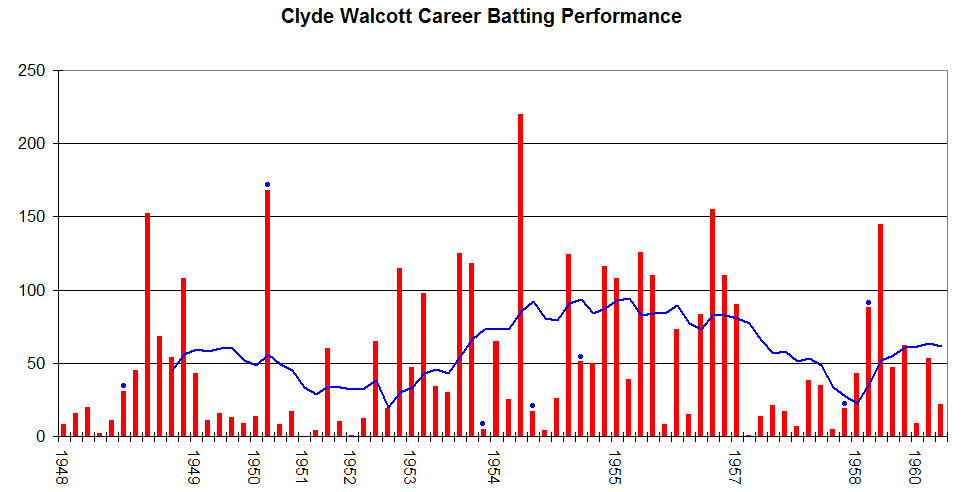
Clyde Walcott's career performance graph.

== Legacy ==
Peter Mason has described Walcott as "one of the dominant personalities of international cricket across five decades" and suggests that "no other single individual, both as a player and an administrator, has done more to help West Indies cricket", while "few have made a bigger impact on cricket in general".

== Notes ==
Preceded by Colin Cowdrey	President of the ICC; 1993-1997	Succeeded by Jagmohan Dalmiya
