= Sonny Ramadhin =

West Indian cricketer (1929–2022)

Sonny Ramadhin, CM
Personal information
- Born: 1 May 1929; Esperance, Trinidad and Tobago
- Died: 27 February 2022 (aged 92); Delph, England
- Batting: Right-handed
- Bowling: Right-arm off break

International information
- National side: West Indies (1950–1960)
- Test debut (cap 70): 8 June 1950 v England
- Last Test: 30 December 1960 v Australia

Career statistics
Competition	Test	First-class
Matches	43	184
Runs scored	361	1,092
Batting average	8.20	8.66
100s/50s	0/0	0/0
Top score	44	44
Balls bowled	13,939	44,937
Wickets	158	758
Bowling average	28.98	20.24
5 wickets in innings	10	51
10 wickets in match	1	15
Best bowling	7/49	8/15
Catches/stumpings	9/–	38/–
- Source: ESPNCricInfo, 7 January 2020

Sonny Ramadhin, CM (1 May 1929 – 27 February 2022) was a West Indian cricketer, and was a dominant bowler of the 1950s. He was the first of many West Indian cricketers of Indian origin, and was one of the five Wisden Cricketers of the Year in 1951. He is most famous for his performance in the West Indies' 1950 tour of England, which was immortalised in the song "Victory Calypso". He was also well known for his ability to turn the ball both ways and he was also largely known for using three short-legs along with close in fielders on the off-side during his playing days in order to exert more pressure on the batsmen. He was referred to as "a small neat man whose shirt-sleeves were always buttoned at the wrist". He was the last surviving member of the 1950 West Indies team that secured the West Indies' first-ever Test series win in England.

== Biography ==
Ramadhin was born in Esperance Village, near San Fernando, Trinidad and Tobago, on 1 May 1929. His birth certificate did not record a first name; he was listed simply as "boy", and he later adopted his nickname "Sonny" as his given name. He was introduced to cricket at the Canadian Mission School in Duncan Village, although he did not bowl while in school. Under the captaincy and coaching of Oscar Roach, who was also from Esperance Village, he went on to play for the Palmiste Club and the Trinidad Leaseholds team. It is also believed that he developed his spin bowling under Roach's guidance.

== Career ==
=== Breakthrough 1950 England tour ===
His trials for the West Indian team were two first-class matches bowling for Trinidad versus Jamaica, where he took 12 wickets at an average of 19.25. This performance led to his selection for the 1950 tour to England at the age of 21.

He made his test debut, along with Alf Valentine, in the first Test of that same Test series against England which started on 8 June 1950. He thus became the first cricketer of East Indian origin to play for the West Indies in international cricket. Ramadhin was named as KT Ramadhin in the English newspapers, to his surprise: "The kids at school had called me Sonny so I adopted that. But when I got to England they insisted that nobody could go through life without initials. The next time I picked up the paper I'd become K T Ramadhin. I never did find out what my new English names were supposed to be." The inclusion of both Valentine and Ramadhin for the test series was initially deemed as a surprise call in cricketing circles, especially someone like Ramadhin who received his maiden test call-up after having featured in only two first-class matches.

England won the first match of the series at Old Trafford, but in the second Test, at Lord's, the West Indies recorded a 326-run victory, thanks to Clyde Walcott's 168 not out in the second innings, and to the bowling of Ramadhin (11 for 152) and Valentine (7 for 127).

This was West Indies' first ever Test victory in England, and it was commemorated in the famous "Victory Calypso":

Second Test and West Indies won
With those two little pals of mine
Ramadhin and Valentine

The 1950 win by the West Indies led Lord Beginner to write the first in a deluge of calypsos celebrating West Indian cricketers, giving rise to calypso cricket. Ramadhin bowled the leg-break and off-break without a discernible change in his action.

He and fellow spinner Alf Valentine continued to dominate and wreaking havoc on the English batting in the 1950 series, taking 59 wickets between them. They also bowled in tandem for several overs in their debut series (Ramadhin bowled 377.5 overs while Valentine ended up bowling 422.3 overs). West Indies won the series by three matches to one, which was their first series victory in England. West Indies also notably secured historic win at Lord's for the first time during the series. The Wisden heaped praise on his bowling performance in England by stating "No blame could be attached to pitch... Ramadhin bowled with the guile of a veteran. He pitched a tantalizing length, bowled straight at the wicket and spun enough to beat the bat." He also received praise from former English player Denis Compton who described Ramadhin as "the best match winning bowler in the world".

=== Post 1950 series ===
When England returned to the West Indies in early 1954, Ramadhin took 13 wickets in the first two Tests and was instrumental in West Indies' victory. He was the first bowler to take two five-wicket hauls in his first two Test matches, against England. In the 1957 tour of England Ramadhin still exerted his hold over batsmen, taking 7/49 to dismiss England for 186 in the first innings of the First Test at Edgbaston. The West Indies made 474 in its first innings. Then Colin Cowdrey joined Peter May at 113/3 in the second innings, still 175 runs behind. May and Cowdrey padded away any ball from Ramadhin outside off stump, where they could not be given out leg before wicket. May made 285 not out and Cowdrey 154 and together added 411 runs in 511 minutes, the third highest stand in Test cricket at the time, the highest for the fourth wicket until 2009, the highest stand ever made for England and the highest stand against the West Indies by any team. Ramadhin was forced to bowl 98–35–179–2, the most overs by a bowler in a first class innings. England won the series 3–0.

== Later years ==
He decided to play in Lancashire League as a professional and then decided to play first-class cricket for Lancashire after ending a prolific international career which spanned for a decade. His international career came to a close in 1960 when Lance Gibbs started to make an impact as the lead spinner for West Indies especially taking over the reins from Ramadhin in historic test series against Australia in 1960–61.

He ended up his international career having taken 158 test wickets in 43 appearances.

In 1964/65 he played for Lancashire, terminating his contract abruptly when he lost form. From 1968 until 1972, he represented Lincolnshire in the Minor Counties Championship.

In June 1988, Ramadhin was celebrated on the 75c Trinidad and Tobago stamp alongside the Barbados Cricket Buckle.

== Personal life and death ==
Ramadhin settled in England after retiring from international cricket. From 1965 until 1990, he and his wife ran the White Lion pub in Delph, and he spent nearly 12 years living in the village towards the end of his life. He served as President of Friarmere Cricket Club for a considerable number of years. His son Craig Ramadhin eventually played for Friarmere Cricket Club for about 50 years.

Ramadhin died on 27 February 2022, at the age of 92. His grandson, Kyle Hogg was a fast bowler who played for Lancashire between 2001 and 2014. His son-in-law Willie Hogg also played first-class cricket for Lancashire.
