= John Goddard (cricketer) =

West Indian cricketer (1919–1987)

John Goddard OBE
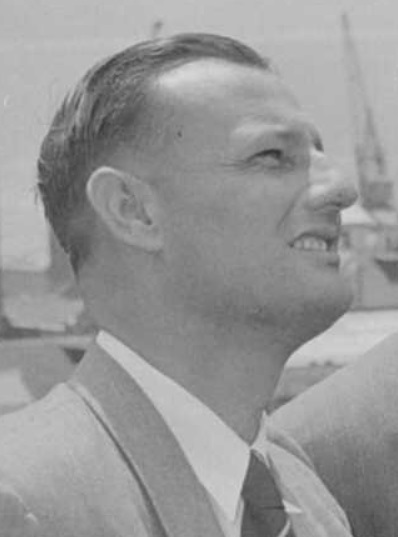
- John Goddard in 1956

Personal information
- Full name: John Douglas Claude Goddard
- Born: 21 April 1919; Fontabelle, St Michael, Barbados
- Died: 26 August 1987 (aged 68); London, England
- Batting: Left-handed
- Bowling: Right-arm medium Right-arm off-break

International information
- National side: West Indies
- Test debut (cap 56): 21 January 1948 v England
- Last Test: 24 August 1957 v England

Domestic team information
- Years: Team
- 1936/37–1957/58: Barbados

Career statistics
Competition	Tests	First-class
Matches	27	111
Runs scored	859	3,769
Batting average	30.67	33.35
100s/50s	0/4	5/17
Top score	83*	218*
Balls bowled	2,931	10,295
Wickets	33	146
Bowling average	31.81	26.33
5 wickets in innings	1	4
10 wickets in match	0	0
Best bowling	5/31	5/20
Catches/stumpings	22/0	94/0
- Source: CricInfo, 30 May 2019

John Douglas Claude Goddard OBE (21 April 1919 – 26 August 1987) was a cricketer from Barbados who captained the West Indies in 22 of his 27 Test matches between 1948 and 1957.

== Early life and career with Barbados ==
Goddard was born in Fontabelle, Saint Michael, Barbados, into a family that controlled one of the leading trading companies in Barbados. He attended The Lodge School in Barbados, where he excelled at cricket, soccer and athletics.

He played for Barbados from 1936–37 to 1957–58. A middle-order batsman, he scored five first-class centuries in his career, all for Barbados in the period from 1942–43 to 1946–47, when in 12 matches he made 1219 runs at an average of 67.72. His highest score was 218 not out, against Trinidad in 1943–44, when he and Frank Worrell added 502 in 404 minutes in an unbroken partnership for the fourth wicket.

Goddard captained Barbados from 1946–47 until his retirement after the 1957–58 season. Of the 13 matches in which he captained the team, they lost only once, a narrow loss to the touring MCC in 1953–54.

== Test career to 1950 ==
Goddard made his Test debut in the West Indies' first series after the Second World War, when England toured in 1947–48. Goddard played in all four Tests, taking over the captaincy in the Third and Fourth Tests. His medium-paced bowling was more successful than his batting (he ran through the England top order in the Third Test to take 5 for 31, and in the series he took 11 wickets at 26.09 and made 122 runs at 24.40) but it was in captaincy that he excelled. The first two Tests had been drawn, but under Goddard, West Indies won the last two easily. After the Third Test, Wisden announced that West Indies had "discovered a really efficient captain"; after the Fourth Test it spoke of his "inspiring leadership" and called him "a great captain".

He led the West Indies in 1948–49 on their first tour of India, winning the five match series 1–0. Wisden noted: "The West Indian team found great inspiration in the leadership of Goddard, whose sound judgment and circumspection were attributes that counted so much for the success of the tour. A talented player and expert tactician, he commanded the respect of his men and so got the best out of them." He made 190 runs at 47.50 and took 9 wickets at 39.00 in the series.

The 1950 tour of England was a triumph for the West Indies. In their three previous tours of England they had never won a Test match – this time they won the series 3–1. Wisden commented: "A heavy responsibility falls on any touring captain, and Goddard with his strong personality showed ability to control his men both on and off the field. All of them had the utmost faith in him ... there can be no question that the flourishing state of cricket in the Caribbean to-day is partly due to his shrewdness and leadership." Goddard made only 106 runs at 26.50 batting at number eight, and bowled only 74.4 overs in the four Tests, taking 6 wickets at 20.33.

At this stage Goddard had captained West Indies in 11 Tests, winning six and losing only one.

== Test career after 1950 ==
Goddard was appointed Officer of the Order of the British Empire (OBE) in the 1951 Birthday Honours for services to sport in Barbados.

The tour of Australia in 1951–52, however, resulted in a 4–1 win to Australia, and the 1–0 victory in the two-Test series that followed in New Zealand was insufficient compensation. Goddard made 182 runs at 26.00 and took 5 wickets at 32.20 in the six Tests he played (he stood down for the Fifth Test, allowing Jeff Stollmeyer to captain the side – to a 202-run defeat).

By this time his captaincy was beginning to arouse dissent. As Australia inched towards a one-wicket victory in the Fourth Test in Melbourne, Goddard argued on the field with Stollmeyer and Gerry Gomez about who should bowl, and Sonny Ramadhin, who had bowled 39 overs and taken three wickets, got fed up and walked off the field. After the tour, Stollmeyer, who had been Goddard's vice-captain in India, England, Australia and New Zealand, said that Goddard had received too much credit for the success of the 1950 tour, and that the other senior players of the side had received too little. His comments led to long-standing animosities and divisions in the West Indian camp. Later, when Goddard was picked to captain the team in the tour of England in 1957, Stollmeyer quit first-class cricket for good.

Goddard did not play in the home series against India in 1952–53, England in 1953–54, or Australia in 1954–55, when Stollmeyer was the captain for most of the time. He returned to the side as player-manager of the team to New Zealand in 1955–56, when Denis Atkinson was captain and Stollmeyer did not tour. Playing in the first three Tests of the four-match series, Goddard scored 147 runs for once out, including his highest Test score of 83 not out in the Second Test at Christchurch, when he added 143 for the seventh wicket with Atkinson after West Indies had been 169 for 6. West Indies won all three Tests, then lost the Fourth, in which Goddard did not play.

The 1957 tour to England resulted in a 3–0 defeat in the five-match series. Goddard himself made only 112 runs at 16.00 and took 2 wickets at 64.00. His resolute defence helped the team draw the First and Third Tests. In the Third, West Indies followed on 247 runs behind and were 194 for 6 when Goddard came to the wicket, and he made 61 in 215 minutes in a partnership of 154 with Collie Smith that left England too little time to score the winning runs.

His final tally from 22 Tests as captain was eight wins, seven losses and seven draws.

Apart from his captaincy and his batting and bowling, he was also a fine fielder close to the wicket, "notably at silly mid-off".

== Later life ==
Goddard was company accountant and a director of Goddard Enterprises Limited, a trading company founded by his father in Barbados in 1921. He served on the Barbados Cricket Association board of management from 1952 to 1965, the last five years as vice-president, and also helped to select Barbados teams in the 1960s.

He was a brother of noted author, lecturer and mystic Neville Goddard. Goddard died suddenly in London in 1987 while visiting for the celebrations of the bicentenary of the MCC.

Preceded by Gerry Gomez	West Indies Test cricket captains 1947–48 – 1951–52	Succeeded by Jeffrey Stollmeyer
Preceded by Denis Atkinson	West Indies Test cricket captains 1957	Succeeded by Gerry Alexander
