= West Indian cricket team in India in 1958–59 =

International cricket tour

	India	West Indies
- Dates: 5 November 1958 – 15 February 1959
Captains	Polly Umrigar (1st Test); Ghulam Ahmed (2nd and 3rd Tests); Vinoo Mankad (4th Test); Hemu Adhikari (5th Test)	Gerry Alexander

Test series
- Result: West Indies won the 5-match series 3–0
Most runs	Polly Umrigar (337)	Garfield Sobers (557)
Most wickets	Subhash Gupte (22)	Wes Hall (30)

The West Indies cricket team toured India from November 1958 to February 1959 and played a five-match Test series against the India national cricket team. The West Indies won the series 3–0. The West Indies were captained by Gerry Alexander while India used four different captains in the series, Ghulam Ahmed leading in two Tests. They also played 12 other first-class fixtures, winning six of them and the rest ending in draws. They finished the tour undefeated.

== Touring party ==
The West Indies Cricket Board announced a 16-man squad for the India tour on 1 April 1958 led by Frank Worrell. However, Worrell withdrew from the tour in May. John Holt and Wes Hall were added to the squad in August.

The squad included:

- Gerry Alexander (c)
- Eric Atkinson
- Basil Butcher
- Robin Bynoe
- Lance Gibbs
- Roy Gilchrist
- Wes Hall
- Jackie Hendriks (wk)
- John Holt
- Conrad Hunte
- Rohan Kanhai
- Sonny Ramadhin
- Willie Rodriguez
- Collie Smith
- Garfield Sobers
- Joe Solomon
- Jaswick Taylor

== Tour matches ==
=== Three-day: Hyderabad v West Indians ===
29–31 January 1959
Scorecard

Hyderabad	v	West Indians
232 (88.1 overs); Habib Ahmed 50; Sonny Ramadhin 4/45 (24 overs)		315 (72.5 overs); Conrad Hunte 80; M. Jairam 4/101 (30 overs)
137 (49 overs); M. L. Jaisimha 52; Willie Rodriguez 3/24 (7 overs)		57/0 (9.3 overs); Conrad Hunte 41*

West Indians won by 10 wickets
Fateh Stadium, Hyderabad

- Hyderabad won the toss and elected to bat.
- Wes Hall (West Indians) claimed his 100th wicket in first-class matches.
- Mehboob Nausheer, Edulji Aibara, Ahmed Rafiuddin and Ghulam Ahmed (all Hyderabad) played their final first-class match.

Opting to bat first after having won the toss, Hyderabad made 232, with Habib Ahmed top-scoring with a half-century. The West Indians began strongly and were at 242/3 at one stage, before the new ball was taken by the hosts. M. Jairam made the best of it, and claimed wickets which included Basil Butcher and Rohan Kanhai. His five-over spell with the new ball ended with figures 4/17. The visitors were all out for 315, having secured an 83-run lead over Hyderabad. The hosts began their second innings poorly, with both openers being dismissed cheaply after struggling against the bowling of Wes Hall and Eric Atkinson, before closing day 2 at 19/2. The first session saw them collapse offering barely any resistance to the West Indian bowling, barring M. L. Jaisimha, Edulji Aibara and Ahmed. They were dismissed for 137. The West Indians reached the target of 55 runs in 32 minutes without losing a wicket.

=== Three-day: North Zone v West Indians ===
13–15 February 1958
Scorecard

West Indians	v	North Zone
76 (22 overs); Willie Rodriguez 15; Dattu Phadkar 5/29 (11 overs)		59 (24 overs); Bhupinder Singh 25; Lance Gibbs 5/22 (11 overs)
228 (64 overs); Rohan Kanhai 79; Dattu Phadkar 4/53 (19 overs)		172 (66.2 overs); Swaranjit Singh 60; Lance Gibbs 5/39 (29.2 overs)

West Indians won by 73 runs
Gandhi Sports Complex Ground, Amritsar

- North Zone won the toss and elected to field.
- Sivaji Bose (North Zone) played his last first-class match.

The last match of the tour began with the visitors collapsing for a total of 76 runs and bowling out their opposition for 59 all inside four hours of play on day 1. Before tea, a combined total of 21 wickets had fallen. At close of play, the West Indians were at 106/1, having added 80 runs for the second wicket through Rohan Kanhai and Collie Smith. Kanhai became the second West Indian, after Garfield Sobers to reach 1,000 runs for the tour. Dew on the pitch the following morning meant the West Indians struggled against the bowling of Narain Swamy, Swaranjit Singh and Dattu Phadkar. However, they reached 228 before being bowled out; the North Zone became the first team to claim all 20 wickets of the West Indians during the tour. North Zone's fourth innings chase of 246 closed on day 2 at 77/3. They were dismissed for 172 on the final day. The only notable partnership came from captain Swaranjit Singh (60) and Yogendra Chowdhury (36), who put on 84 runs for the fourth wicket. The final five wickets added a mere 30 runs before collapsing in under an hour. The match ended with more than three hours to spare.

== Test series summary ==
=== First Test ===
28 November–3 December 1958
Scorecard

West Indies	v	India
227 (101.1 overs); Rohan Kanhai 66; Subhash Gupte 4/86 (33 overs)		152 (68.2 overs); Polly Umrigar 55; Roy Gilchrist 4/39 (23.2 overs)
323/4d (112 overs); Garfield Sobers 142*; Ghulam Guard 2/69 (17 overs)		289/5 (132 overs); Pankaj Roy 90; Roy Gilchrist 2/75 (41 overs)

Match drawn
Brabourne Stadium, Bombay
Umpires: Jamshed Patel (Ind) and M. G. Vijayasarathi (Ind)

- West Indies won the toss and elected to bat.
- Chandu Borde, Ghulam Guard and Manohar Hardikar (all Ind), and Basil Butcher and Wes Hall (both Win) made their Test debuts.
- 1 December was taken as a rest day.
- Collie Smith (Win) and Gulabrai Ramchand (Ind) passed 1,000 runs while Polly Umrigar (Ind) passed 2,000 runs in Tests.
- Subhash Gupte became the second India player to claim 100 Test wickets.

=== Second Test ===
12–17 December 1958
Scorecard

West Indies	v	India
222 (85.3 overs); Gerry Alexander 70; Subhash Gupte 9/102 (34.3 overs)		222 (101.4 overs); Polly Umrigar 57; Wes Hall 6/50 (28.4 overs)
443/7d (127 overs); Garfield Sobers 198; Gulabrai Ramchand 2/114 (40 overs)		240 (101.1 overs); Nari Contractor 50; Wes Hall 5/76 (32 overs)

West Indies won by 203 runs
Green Park Stadium, Kanpur
Umpires: Mohammad Yunus (Ind) and Jamshed Patel (Ind)

- West Indies won the toss and elected to bat.
- 15 December was taken as a rest day.
- Vasant Ranjane (Ind) and Joe Solomon (Win) made their Test debuts.

=== Third Test ===
31 December 1958–4 January 1959
Scorecard

West Indies	v	India
614/5d (162.1 overs); Rohan Kanhai 256; Surendranath 2/168 (46 overs)		124 (62.5 overs); Polly Umrigar 44*; Roy Gilchrist 3/18 (23 overs)
		154 (f/o) (49 overs); Vijay Manjrekar 58*; Roy Gilchrist 6/55 (21 overs)

West Indies won by an innings and 336 runs
Eden Gardens, Calcutta
Umpires: Mohammad Yunus (Ind) and Noshirvan Nagarwala (Ind)

- West Indies won the toss and elected to bat.
- Ramnath Kenny and Surendranath (both Ind) made their Test debuts.
- Rohan Kanhai made his first century and the highest individual by a West Indies player against India in a Test (256).
- 2 January was taken as a rest day.

=== Fourth Test ===
21–26 January 1959
Scorecard

West Indies	v	India
500 (181 overs); Basil Butcher 142; Vinoo Mankad 4/95 (38 overs)		222 (78.1 overs); A. G. Kripal Singh 53; Garfield Sobers 4/26 (18.1 overs)
168/5d (76 overs); John Holt 81*; Subhash Gupte 4/78 (30 overs)		151 (70 overs); Chandu Borde 56; Roy Gilchrist 3/36 (17 overs)

West Indies won by 295 runs
Nehru Stadium, Madras
Umpires: Bapu Joshi (Ind) and M. G. Vijayasarathi (Ind)

- West Indies won the toss and elected to bat.
- Apoorva Sengupta (Ind) made his Test debut.
- 23 January was taken as a rest day.
- Rohan Kanhai and Garfield Sobers (both Win) passed 1,000 and 2,000 runs respectively in Tests.
- Roy Gilchrist (Win) claimed his 50th wicket in Tests.

=== Fifth Test ===
6–11 February 1959
Scorecard

India	v	West Indies
415 (141.3 overs); Chandu Borde 109; Wes Hall 4/66 (26 overs)		644/8d (214 overs); John Holt 123; Ramakant Desai 4/169 (49 overs)
275 (111.2 overs); Chandu Borde 96; Collie Smith 5/90 (42 overs)

Match drawn
Feroz Shah Kotla Ground, Delhi
Umpires: Santosh Ganguli (Ind) and Noshirvan Nagarwala (Ind)

- India won the toss and elected to bat.
- Ramakant Desai (Ind) made his Test debut.
- Chandu Borde (Ind) scored his first Test century.
- 9 February was taken as a rest day.
- John Holt passed 1,000 runs in Tests.
