= Pakistani cricket team in the West Indies in 1957–58 =

International cricket tour

The Pakistan national cricket team toured the West Indies from January to March 1958 and played a five-match Test series against the West Indies cricket team which the West Indies won 3–1. Pakistan were captained by Abdul Hafeez Kardar; West Indies by Gerry Alexander. The series was noted for high-scoring feats with Hanif Mohammad scoring 337 in 970 minutes at Bridgetown and then Garfield Sobers scoring a then world record 365 not out at Sabina Park. Sobers shared a second wicket partnership of 446 with Conrad Hunte who scored 260.

== Test series summary ==
=== First Test ===
17, 18, 20, 21, 22, 23 January 1958
(6-day match)
Scorecard

West Indies	v	Pakistan
579/9d (172.2 overs); ED Weekes 197; Mahmood Hussain 4/153 (41.2 overs)		106 (42.2 overs); Imtiaz Ahmed 20; R Gilchrist 4/32 (15 overs)
28/0 (11 overs); RB Kanhai 17*		657/8d (f/o) (319 overs); Hanif Mohammad 337; AL Valentine 2/109 (39 overs)

Match drawn
Kensington Oval, Bridgetown, Barbados
Umpires: HBD Jordan and JH Walcott

- West Indies won the toss and elected to bat.
- 19 January was taken as a rest day.
- Saeed Ahmed, Haseeb Ahsan and Nasim-ul-Ghani (all PAK), and ES Atkinson and CC Hunte (both WIN) made their Test debuts.
- At the time Hanif Mohammad's 337 was the second-highest score in Test cricket, behind L Hutton's 364 in 1938.
- The 551 run difference between the Pakistan 1st and 2nd innings is still the biggest difference in innings in Test match history.

=== Second Test ===
5, 6, 7, 8, 10, 11 February 1958
(6-day match)
Scorecard

West Indies	v	Pakistan
325 (131.1 overs); RB Kanhai 96; Nasim-ul-Ghani 3/42 (13.1 overs)		282 (86.3 overs); W Mathias 73; OG Smith 4/71 (25 overs)
312 (130.2 overs); GS Sobers 80; Fazal Mahmood 4/89 (51 overs)		235 (104.5 overs); Hanif Mohammad 81; R Gilchrist 4/61 (19 overs)

West Indies won by 120 runs
Queen's Park Oval, Port of Spain, Trinidad
Umpires: EN Lee Kow and EL Lloyd

- West Indies won the toss and elected to bat.
- 9 February was taken as a rest day.
- LR Gibbs, EDAS McMorris and IS Madray (all WIN) made their Test debuts.

=== Third Test ===
26, 27, 28 February, 1, 3, 4 March 1958
(6-day match)
Scorecard

Pakistan	v	West Indies
328 (102 overs); Imtiaz Ahmed 122; ES Atkinson 5/42 (21 overs)		790/3d (208.1 overs); GS Sobers 365*; Fazal Mahmood 2/247 (85.2 overs)
288 (96.3 overs); Wazir Mohammad 106; ES Atkinson 3/36 (18 overs)

West Indies won by an innings and 174 runs
Sabina Park, Kingston, Jamaica
Umpires: P Burke and TA Ewart

- Pakistan won the toss and elected to bat.
- 2 March was taken as a rest day.
- Sobers' 365* was the highest score in Test cricket, until overtaken by BC Lara in 1993–94.

=== Fourth Test ===
13, 14, 15, 17, 18, 19, March 1958
(6-day match)
Scorecard

Pakistan	v	West Indies
408 (125.1 overs); Saeed Ahmed 150; R Gilchrist 4/102 (28 overs)		410 (133.4 overs); CL Walcott 145; Nasim-ul-Ghani 5/116 (41.4 overs)
318 (139.1 overs); Wazir Mohammad 97*; LR Gibbs 5/80 (42 overs)		317/2 (93.1 overs); CC Hunte 114; Fazal-ur-Rehman 1/43 (17 overs)

West Indies won by 8 wickets
Bourda, Georgetown, British Guiana
Umpires: ES Gillette and FCP Kippins

- Pakistan won the toss and elected to bat.
- 16 March was taken as a rest day.
- Fazal-ur-Rehman (PAK) made his Test debut.

=== Fifth Test ===
26, 27, 28, 29, 31 March 1958
(6-day match)
Scorecard

West Indies	v	Pakistan
268 (93.1 overs); OG Smith 86; Fazal Mahmood 6/83 (32 overs)		496 (177.5 overs); Wazir Mohammad 189; JO Taylor 5/109 (36.5 overs)
227 (65.5 overs); CL Walcott 62; Nasim-ul-Ghani 6/67 (30.5 overs)

Pakistan won by an innings and 1 run
Queen's Park Oval, Port of Spain, Trinidad
Umpires: EL Lloyd and G Williams

- West Indies won the toss and elected to bat.
- The match was scheduled for six days but was completed in five days.
- 30 March was taken as a rest day.
- JO Taylor (WIN) made his Test debut.
