= Australian cricket team in the West Indies in 1954–55 =

International cricket tour

The Australian cricket team toured the West Indies in the 1954–55 season to play a five-match Test series against the West Indies. Australia won the series 3–0 and were extremely popular tourists.

== Australian squad ==
The original squad selected were as follows:

- Batsmen – Colin McDonald, Neil Harvey, Peter Burge, Arthur Morris, Les Favell, Bill Watson
- Fast bowlers – Ray Lindwall, Alan Davidson, Bill Johnston
- Spinners – Ian Johnson (captain), Jack Hill
- All rounders – Richie Benaud, Keith Miller, Ron Archer
- Wicketkeepers – Gil Langley, Len Maddocks

== Test series summary ==
=== First Test ===
26, 28, 29, 30, 31 March 1955
(6-day match)
Scorecard

| Australia | v | West Indies |
| 515/9d (201 overs); KR Miller 147; CL Walcott 3/50 (26 overs) | | 259 (101 overs); CL Walcott 108; RR Lindwall 4/61 (24 overs) |
| 20/1 (5.2 overs); LV Maddocks 12*; ED Weekes 1/8 (2.2 overs) | | 275 (f/o) (96.1 overs); OG Smith 104; KR Miller 3/62 (28 overs) |

Australia won by 9 wickets
Sabina Park, Kingston, Jamaica
Umpires: P Burke and TA Ewart

- Australia won the toss and elected to bat.
- 27 March was taken as a rest day.
- The match was scheduled for six days but completed in five.
- GL Gibbs and OG Smith (both WIN) made their Test debuts.

=== Second Test ===
11, 12, 13, 14, 15, 16 April 1955
(6-day match)
Scorecard

| West Indies | v | Australia |
| 382 (104.5 overs); ED Weekes 139; RR Lindwall 6/95 (24.5 overs) | | 600/9d (201 overs); RN Harvey 133; S Ramadhin 2/90 (32 overs) |
| 273/4 (62 overs); CL Walcott 110; RG Archer 3/37 (8 overs) |

Match drawn
Queen's Park Oval, Port of Spain, Trinidad
Umpires: HBD Jordan and EN Lee Kow

- West Indies won the toss and elected to bat.
- LS Butler (WIN) made his Test debut.

=== Third Test ===
26, 27, 28, 29 April 1955
(6-day match)
Scorecard

| West Indies | v | Australia |
| 182 (43.5 overs); ED Weekes 81; R Benaud 4/15 (3.5 overs) | | 257 (134.3 overs); R Benaud 68; GS Sobers 3/20 (16 overs) |
| 207 (75.2 overs); CL Walcott 73; IWG Johnson 7/44 (22.2 overs) | | 133/2 (58.5 overs); RN Harvey 41*; NE Marshall 1/22 (13 overs) |

Australia won by 8 wickets
Bourda, Georgetown, British Guiana
Umpires: ES Gillette and EN Lee Kow

- West Indies won the toss and elected to bat.
- The match was scheduled for six days but completed in four.
- CC Depeiaza and NE Marshall (both WIN) made their Test debuts.

=== Fourth Test ===
14, 16, 17, 18, 19, 20 May 1955
(6-day match)
Scorecard

| Australia | v | West Indies |
| 668 (235.5 overs); KR Miller 137; DT Dewdney 4/125 (33 overs) | | 510 (157.1 overs); DS Atkinson 219; R Benaud 3/73 (31.1 overs) |
| 249 (109.2 overs); IWG Johnson 57; DS Atkinson 5/56 (36.2 overs) | | 234/6 (72 overs); CL Walcott 83; RG Archer 1/11 (7 overs) |

Match drawn
Kensington Oval, Bridgetown, Barbados
Umpires: HBD Jordan and EN Lee Kow

- Australia won the toss and elected to bat.
- 15 May was taken as a rest day.
- DT Dewdney (WIN) made his Test debut.

The Australian first innings total of 668 at Bridgetown is still the highest Test match innings that does not feature an individual score of 150.

=== Fifth Test ===
11, 13, 14, 15, 16, 17 June 1955
(6-day match)
Scorecard

| West Indies | v | Australia |
| 357 (94.2 overs); CL Walcott 155; KR Miller 6/107 (25.2 overs) | | 758/8d (245.4 overs); RN Harvey 204; FM King 2/126 (31 overs) |
| 319 (117.5 overs); CL Walcott 110; R Benaud 3/76 (29.5 overs) |

Australia won by an innings and 82 runs
Sabina Park, Kingston, Jamaica
Umpires: P Burke and TA Ewart

- West Indies won the toss and elected to bat.
- 12 June was taken as a rest day.
- HA Furlonge (WIN) made his Test debut.

CL Walcott sets a record for the highest aggregate of runs in a Test series (827) without scoring a double-century.
