= English cricket team in the West Indies in 1953–54 =

International cricket tour

The English cricket team in the West Indies in 1953–54 played five Test matches, five other first-class matches and seven other games, three of them on a two-week stop-over in Bermuda that included Christmas.

Ultimately the tour could be considered a success for England in cricketing terms, as they came back from 2–0 down to draw the series 2–2 against strong opposition. However the tour had its problems, both on and off the field. The West Indians were disappointed by the English party's reluctance to socialise and the defensive nature of much of their cricket. The English players were dissatisfied with the quality of some of the umpiring. There was crowd trouble at two of the Tests. Tony Lock was called for throwing in the first Test.

== English team ==
The team of 16 selected by MCC for the tour was arguably the strongest available. It was the first England touring team in modern times to be led by a professional captain.

The team was:

- Leonard Hutton, captain
- Charles Palmer, player/manager
- Trevor Bailey
- Denis Compton
- Godfrey Evans, wicketkeeper
- Tom Graveney
- Jim Laker
- Tony Lock
- Peter May
- Alan Moss
- Dick Spooner, wicketkeeper
- Brian Statham
- Ken Suttle
- Fred Trueman
- Johnny Wardle
- Willie Watson

Only Palmer, Moss and Suttle had not played Test cricket before the tour, and only Suttle did not play in any of the Tests on the tour.

== West Indian team ==
The West Indies had played a home five-Test series against the Indians early in 1953, winning the series by 1–0 with four matches drawn. Of the team that played India, Allan Rae had retired and wicketkeeper Ralph Legall was not chosen for any of the Tests against England. The following existing Test players were selected in the sides to play England:

- Jeff Stollmeyer, captain
- Robert Christiani
- Gerry Gomez
- Frank King
- Bruce Pairaudeau
- Sonny Ramadhin
- Alf Valentine
- Clyde Walcott
- Everton Weekes
- Frank Worrell

In addition, four players who had played in earlier Test series were recalled:

- Denis Atkinson
- Wilfred Ferguson
- George Headley
- Esmond Kentish

The West Indies introduced four players new to Test cricket during the series:

- Michael Frederick
- John Holt (Jr)
- Cliff McWatt, wicketkeeper
- Garfield Sobers

== Test series summary ==
Five Test matches were played. The West Indies won the first two, England the third. The fourth match was left drawn after six days and England won the fifth and final match to draw the series.

=== First Test ===
15, 16, 18, 19, 20, 21 January 1954
(6-day match)
Scorecard

West Indies	v	England
417 (155.4 overs); JKC Holt 94; JB Statham 4/90 (36 overs)		170 (89.2 overs); PBH May 31; S Ramadhin 4/65 (35 overs)
209/6d (67 overs); ED Weekes 90*; GAR Lock 2/36 (14 overs)		316 (129.3 overs); W Watson 116; ESM Kentish 5/49 (29 overs)

West Indies won by 140 runs
Sabina Park, Kingston, Jamaica
Umpires: P Burke and TA Ewart

- West Indies won the toss and elected to bat.
- 17 January was taken as a rest day.
- MC Frederick, JKC Holt and CA McWatt (all WIN), and AE Moss (ENG) made their Test debuts.

The West Indies introduced three new players – Frederick, Holt and McWatt – and recalled Headley and Kentish. In so doing, Headley became the oldest cricketer to play for West Indies. With consistent batting, West Indies made 417, with five players reaching 50 and Holt top-scoring with 94. After Holt was out, adjudged lbw, the wife and son of the umpire, Perry Burke, were attacked in the crowd, though they were not seriously hurt. England's reply was woeful, Ramadhin and Valentine taking seven wickets in a total of 170 all out. West Indies captain Stollmeyer was booed by the crowd for not enforcing the follow-on, and he declared at 209 for six wickets, setting England 457 to win. At 277 for two, with Watson making a century, the game looked even. But England lost seven wickets for eight runs and were all out for 316, Kentish taking five wickets for 49 runs. Lock was no-balled for throwing, the first such instance in a Test match since Ernie Jones at Melbourne for Australia against England in 1897–98.

=== Second Test ===
6, 8, 9, 10, 11, 12 February 1954
(6-day match)
Scorecard

West Indies	v	England
383 (125.1 overs); CL Walcott 220; JC Laker 4/81 (30.1 overs)		181 (150.5 overs); L Hutton 72; S Ramadhin 4/50 (53 overs)
292/2d (96 overs); JKC Holt 166; JB Statham 1/49 (15 overs)		313 (139.4 overs); DCS Compton 93; S Ramadhin 3/71 (37 overs)

West Indies won by 181 runs
Kensington Oval, Bridgetown, Barbados
Umpires: HBD Jordan and JH Walcott

- West Indies won the toss and elected to bat.
- 7 February was taken as a rest day.
- CH Palmer (ENG) made his Test debut.

Walcott scored 220 out of a first-innings total of 383. England then batted painfully slowly, taking 150 overs to make 181 runs. Stollmeyer again did not enforce the follow-on: Holt made a maiden Test century, 166 out of a total of 292 for two declared. Needing 495 to win, England reached 258 for three before another collapse left them all out for 313.

=== Third Test ===
24, 25, 26, 27 February, 1, 2 March 1954
(6-day match)
Scorecard

England	v	West Indies
435 (220 overs); L Hutton 169; S Ramadhin 6/113 (67 overs)		251 (105.5 overs); ED Weekes 94; JB Statham 4/64 (27 overs)
75/1 (20.1 overs); TW Graveney 33*; DS Atkinson 1/34 (7 overs)		256 (f/o) (117.3 overs); JKC Holt 64; JH Wardle 3/24 (12.3 overs)

England won by 9 wickets
Bourda, Georgetown, British Guiana
Umpires: ES Gillette and B Menzies

- England won the toss and elected to bat.
- 28 February was taken as a rest day.

England batted first and made 435 through Hutton's 169 and consistent batting from the others. Though Weekes made 94 and McWatt and the injured Holt added 99 for the eighth wicket, West Indies were all out for 251. The crowd threw bottles and other objects when McWatt was adjudged run out, but Hutton refused to take his players from the pitch. Following on, West Indies fared little better, scoring 256 and leaving England just 73 to win. Moss, who made his debut in the first Test, took five wickets.

=== Fourth Test ===
17, 18, 19, 20, 22, 23 March 1954
(6-day match)
Scorecard

West Indies	v	England
681/8d (198.4 overs); ED Weekes 206; DCS Compton 2/40 (8.4 overs)		537 (221.2 overs); Peter May 135; CL Walcott 3/52 (34 overs)
212/4d (55 overs); FMM Worrell 56; TE Bailey 2/20 (12 overs)		98/3 (30 overs); W Watson 32; S Ramadhin 1/6 (7 overs)

Match drawn
Queen's Park Oval, Port of Spain, Trinidad
Umpires: EE Achong and K Woods

- West Indies won the toss and elected to bat.
- 21 March was taken as a rest day.

On a batsman's wicket, the sides took the first five days to complete the first two innings. West Indies' 681 for eight declared was the highest score by a West Indies cricket team: Weekes made 206, Worrell 167 and Walcott 124. England made 537 in reply, with centuries from May and Compton and 92 from Graveney. The game petered out on the sixth day.

=== Fifth Test ===
30, 31 March, 1, 2, 3 April 1954
(6-day match)
Scorecard

West Indies	v	England
139 (60.4 overs); CL Walcott 50; TE Bailey 7/34 (16 overs)		414 (176.5 overs); L Hutton 205; GS Sobers 4/75 (28.5 overs)
346 (170 overs); CL Walcott 116; JC Laker 4/71 (50 overs)		72/1 (15.5 overs); PBH May 40*; FM King 1/21 (4 overs)

England won by 9 wickets
Sabina Park, Kingston, Jamaica
Umpires: P Burke and TA Ewart

- West Indies won the toss and elected to bat.
- The match was scheduled for six days but completed in five.
- GS Sobers (WIN) made his Test debut.

West Indies, winning the toss, were bowled out for 139 on what had appeared to be a perfect pitch for batting. Bailey took seven wickets for 34 runs, his best Test return. England's reply of 414 was based on a double century for Hutton and some later hitting by Wardle. Facing arrears of 275, West Indies lost wickets consistently, and though Walcott made his third century of the series, England needed just 72 to win. The match was the Test debut of Sobers, aged 17: he scored 14 not out and 26 and took four wickets.

== Other matches ==
The MCC team played five first-class matches, winning against Jamaica, Barbados, British Guiana (Guyana) and Trinidad and drawing a second match against Jamaica.

- In the match against Barbados, in which MCC recorded their first victory for 50 years, Suttle top-scored in both MCC innings, but still failed to be picked for the Tests. He never played for England.
- In the match against British Guiana, Watson scored 257 and Graveney 231 as MCC made 607. Their fourth wicket stand of 402 is, as of 2012, the 14th highest of all fourth wicket partnerships in first-class cricket.

In minor matches, MCC won one and drew two in Bermuda, won one and drew one in Jamaica, beat the Leeward Islands and drew with the Windward Islands, the latter two teams not being first-class in 1954.

== Issues arising from the tour ==
Wisden Cricketers' Almanack 1955 edition reported that the tour was beset by controversy. Billed as a kind of world championship, the Test series was subject to much partisanship on the part of both West Indians and English expatriates; umpiring decisions added to the controversy, with the MCC team feeling hard done by over several decisions by local umpires and the crowds reacting with violence over two decisions that went England's way in the First and Third Tests. Wisden recommended that the West Indies draw up a panel of umpires from all the countries rather than using local umpires in each match. But it also had harsh words for England players whose dissent was made public, and also for the excessive caution of the England team in the Second Test. The experiment of using a player-manager on a controversial tour, Wisden said, was also "not to be commended".

== External sources ==
- England in West Indies, 1953-54 at Cricinfo
- CricketArchive – tour itinerary
- The second-most controversial tour in history
