= Leslie Clark (disambiguation) =

Leslie Clark may refer to:

- Les Clark (1907–1979), American animator and director
- Leslie Clark (engineer) (born 1944), British structural engineer
- Leslie Clark (umpire) (1903–1974), New Zealand cricket umpire
- Leslie Clark (cricketer) (born 1930), New Zealand cricketer and son of the umpire
