= International cricket in 1953–54 =

International cricket season

The 1953–54 international cricket season was from September 1953 to April 1954.

== Season overview ==
International tours
Start date	Home team	Away team	Results [Matches]			
Start date	Home team	Away team	Test	ODI	FC	LA
19 November 1953	India	Commonwealth	—	—	2–2 [5]	—
11 December 1953	South Africa	New Zealand	4–0 [5]	—	—	—
31 December 1953	Ceylon	Pakistan	—	—	0–1 [1]	—
15 January 1954	West Indies	England	2–2 [5]	—	—	—
30 January 1954	Ceylon	India	—	—	1–0 [1]	—
12 February 1954	New Zealand	Fiji	—	—	1–0 [1]	—
5 March 1954	Australia	New Zealand	—	—	0–2 [3]	—

== November ==
=== Commonwealth in India ===
Unofficial Test series
No.	Date	Home captain	Away captain	Venue	Result
Match 1	19–23 November	Polly Umrigar	Ben Barnett	New Delhi	India by an innings and 15 runs
Match 2	3–7 December	Polly Umrigar	Ben Barnett	Bombay	Match drawn
Match 3	31 Dec–3 January	Polly Umrigar	Ben Barnett	Calcutta	Commonwealth XI by 6 wickets
Match 4	13–17 January	Polly Umrigar	Ben Barnett	Madras	India by an innings and 50 runs
Match 5	31 Jan–4 February	Polly Umrigar	Ben Barnett	Lucknow	Match drawn

== December ==
=== New Zealand in South Africa ===
Test series
No.	Date	Home captain	Away captain	Venue	Result
Test 377	11–15 December	Jack Cheetham	Geoff Rabone	Kingsmead, Durban	South Africa by an innings and 58 runs
Test 378	24–29 December	Jack Cheetham	Geoff Rabone	Ellis Park Stadium, Johannesburg	South Africa by 132 runs
Test 379	1–5 January	Jack Cheetham	Geoff Rabone	Newlands, Cape Town	Match drawn
Test 381	29 Jan–2 February	Jack Cheetham	Bert Sutcliffe	Ellis Park Stadium, Johannesburg	South Africa by 9 wickets
Test 382	5–9 February	Jack Cheetham	Bert Sutcliffe	Crusaders Ground, Port Elizabeth	South Africa by 5 wickets

=== Pakistan in Ceylon ===
First-class Match
No.	Date	Home captain	Away captain	Venue	Result
FC Match	31 Dec–3 January	Fredrick de Saram	Abdul Kardar	P Saravanamuttu Stadium, Colombo	Pakistan Services by 4 wickets

== January ==
=== England in the West Indies ===
Test Series
No.	Date	Home captain	Away captain	Venue	Result
Test 380	15–21 January	Jeffrey Stollmeyer	Leonard Hutton	Sabina Park, Kingston	West Indies by 140 runs
Test 383	6–12 February	Jeffrey Stollmeyer	Leonard Hutton	Kensington Oval, Bridgetown	West Indies by 181 runs
Test 384	24 Feb–2 March	Jeffrey Stollmeyer	Leonard Hutton	Bourda, Georgetown	England by 9 wickets
Test 385	17–23 March	Jeffrey Stollmeyer	Leonard Hutton	Queen's Park Oval, Port of Spain	Match drawn
Test 386	30 Mar–3 April	Jeffrey Stollmeyer	Leonard Hutton	Sabina Park, Kingston	England by 9 wickets

=== India in Ceylon ===
MJ Gopalan Trophy
No.	Date	Home captain	Away captain	Venue	Result
FC Match	30 Jan–1 February	Not mentioned	Not mentioned	Nondescripts Cricket Club Ground, Colombo	Ceylon by an innings and 108 runs

== February ==
=== Fiji in New Zealand ===
First-class match
No.	Date	Home captain	Away captain	Venue	Result
FC Match	12–15 January	(Otago) Lankford Smith	Patrick Raddock	Carisbrook, Dunedin	Otago by 2 wickets

== March ==
=== New Zealand in Australia ===
First-class series
No.	Date	Home captain	Away captain	Venue	Result
FC 1	5–9 March	(Western Australia) Keith Carmody	Bert Sutcliffe	WACA Ground, Perth	New Zealand by 184 runs
FC 2	12–16 March	(South Australia) Phil Ridings	Bert Sutcliffe	Adelaide Oval, Adelaide	New Zealand by 8 wickets
FC 3	19–23 March	(Victoria (state)) Ian Johnson	Bert Sutcliffe	Melbourne Cricket Ground, Melbourne	Match drawn
