= Badge Menzies =

West Indian cricket umpire

Personal information
- Born: 1901; British Guiana
- Died: December 1965 (aged 63–64); British Guiana

Umpiring information
- Tests umpired: 1 (1954)
- Source: Cricinfo, 12 July 2013

Badge Menzies (1901 – December 1965) was a West Indian cricket umpire and groundsman from British Guiana. He umpired in one Test match, between West Indies and England, in 1954.

Of Indian and Scottish heritage, Menzies was for many years the groundsman at the Bourda cricket ground in Georgetown, British Guiana, where he often stayed in the groundsman's residence under the main pavilion. At the time the Bourda pitch had the reputation of being the best turf pitch in the Caribbean. He umpired two first-class matches at Bourda in 1944, but thereafter restricted himself to his work on the ground.

After disputes over the standard of the umpiring during the early matches of the English tour of 1953–54, Menzies was asked to umpire the Third Test at Bourda, along with Wing Gillette, replacing the originally appointed umpires. The Test was played amid general unrest in British Guiana, and on the fourth day, when Menzies gave the West Indian player Clifford McWatt run out, there was a minor riot in which members of the crowd threw bottles and wooded crates onto the field. Menzies' decision was correct, but such was the mood of the crowds that he needed police protection for the rest of the match.

Menzies did not umpire another first-class match, and went back to his groundskeeping work in Georgetown. He was also called in after the English tour to supervise the laying of a new turf pitch to replace the matting pitch at Queen's Park Oval in Port of Spain.

== See also ==
- List of Test cricket umpires
