= West Indian Test match records =

This list outlines key records relating to the West Indies cricket team.

== Highest Test innings total ==
- Home: 790–3 declared vs. Pakistan Kingston, 1957–58
- Away: 692–8 declared vs. England The Oval, 1995

== Lowest Test innings total ==
- Home: 27 vs. Australia Kingston, 2025–26
- Away: 53 vs. Pakistan Faisalabad, 1986–87

== Highest individual Test innings ==
- Home: 400* Brian Lara vs. England St. John's, 2003–04
- Away: 291 Viv Richards vs. England The Oval, 1976

== Highest wicket stands ==
Wicket	Total	Batsman	vs	Venue	Year
1st	298	Gordon Greenidge / Desmond Haynes	England	St John's	1989–1990
2nd	446	Conrad Hunte / Garry Sobers	Pakistan	Jamaica	1957–1958
3rd	338	Everton Weekes / Frank Worrell	England	Port of Spain	1953–1953
4th	399	Frank Worrell / Garry Sobers	England	Bridgetown	1959–1960
5th	322	Brian Lara / Jimmy Adams	Australia	Kingston	1998–1999
6th	282*	Brian Lara / Ridley Jacobs	England	St. John's	2003–2004
7th	347	Denis Atkinson / Clairmonte Depeiaza	Australia	Bridgetown	1954–1955
8th	148	Jimmy Adams / Franklyn Rose	Zimbabwe	Kingston	1999–2000
9th	161	Clive Lloyd / Andy Roberts	India	Calcutta	1983–1984
10th §	106	Carl Hooper / Courtney Walsh	Pakistan	St John's	1992–1993

== Best bowling in an innings ==
- Home: 9–95, Jack Noreiga, vs. India, Port of Spain, 1970–71
- Away: 8–92 Michael Holding, vs. England, The Oval, 1976

== Best bowling in a match ==
- Home: 11–84 Curtly Ambrose, vs. England, Port of Spain, 1989–1990
- Away: 14–149 Michael Holding, vs. England, The Oval, 1976

== Biggest win ==
- Innings and 336 runs, vs. India, Calcutta, 1958–59

== Biggest defeat ==
- Innings and 237 runs, vs. England, The Oval, 1957

== See also ==
- List of Test cricket records
