= Hammond Furlonge =

West Indian cricketer (1934–2025)

Personal information
- Full name: Hammond Allan Furlonge
- Born: 19 June 1934; Apex Oilfields, near Fyzabad, Trinidad
- Died: 6 May 2025 (aged 90); Trinidad
- Batting: Right-handed
- Relatives: Carl Furlonge (brother); Kenneth Furlonge (brother)

International information
- National side: West Indies
- Test debut: 11 June 1955 v Australia
- Last Test: 9 March 1956 v New Zealand

Domestic team information
- Years: Team
- 1954/55–1960/61: Trinidad

Career statistics
Competition	Test	First-class
Matches	3	16
Runs scored	99	808
Batting average	19.80	32.32
100s/50s	0/1	2/3
Top score	64	150*
Balls bowled	–	36
Wickets	–	0
Bowling average	–	–
5 wickets in innings	–	–
10 wickets in match	–	–
Best bowling	–	–
Catches/stumpings	0/–	7/–
- Source: Cricinfo, 7 July 2025

Hammond Allan Furlonge (19 June 1934 – 6 May 2025) was a Trinidadian cricketer who played in three Test matches for the West Indies, one against Australia in 1955 and two against New Zealand in 1956.

== Cricket career ==
Furlonge made his first-class debut for Trinidad in 1954-55, opening the batting with Jeff Stollmeyer. In his third match, against the touring Australians, he scored 57 and 150 not out. He was included in the team for the Fifth Test, opening with John Holt, and making 4 and 28.

He toured New Zealand with the West Indies team in 1955-56. He failed to score in the Second Test, but returned for the Fourth Test when he top-scored in the first innings with 64 in a total of 145 all out in a low-scoring match, New Zealand's first Test victory. Dick Brittenden said of this innings that Furlonge's "accentuated two-eyed stance should have made him especially vulnerable to the seamers, but he played with skill and a stout heart for 210 minutes".

Furlonge played a few more matches for Trinidad over the next six seasons, scoring 106 and 45 against Barbados in 1960-61 (his only game as captain), and played his last first-class match in 1961-62.

== Personal life and death ==
His brothers Carl and Kenneth also played for Trinidad. The one match they all played together was the one against Barbados when Hammond captained the side.

Hammond Furlonge died on 6 May 2025, at the age of 90.
