= West Indian cricket team in New Zealand in 1955–56 =

International cricket tour

The West Indies cricket team toured New Zealand between January and March 1956 and played a four-match Test series against the New Zealand national cricket team. West Indies won the series 3–1.

== West Indies team ==
- Denis Atkinson (captain)
- John Goddard (player-manager)
- Alfie Binns
- Clairmonte Depeiaza
- Tom Dewdney
- Wilfred Edun
- Hammond Furlonge
- Frank King
- Bruce Pairaudeau
- Sonny Ramadhin
- Alphonso Roberts
- Collie Smith
- Gary Sobers
- Alf Valentine
- Everton Weekes

== Test series summary ==
=== First Test ===
3, 4, 6 February 1956
(4-day match)
Scorecard

New Zealand	v	West Indies
74 (62.2 overs); JW Guy 23; S Ramadhin 6/23 (21.2 overs)		353 (112.5 overs); ED Weekes 123; RW Blair 4/90 (22.5 overs)
208 (110.2 overs); JEF Beck 66; OG Smith 3/42 (18 overs)

West Indies won by an innings and 71 runs
Carisbrook, Dunedin
Umpires: LG Clark and AE Jelley

- New Zealand won the toss and elected to bat.
- 5 February was taken as a rest day.
- The match was scheduled for four days but completed in three.
- AF Lissette (NZ) made his Test debut.

=== Second Test ===
18, 20, 21 February 1956
(4-day match)
Scorecard

West Indies	v	New Zealand
386 (136.5 overs); ED Weekes 103; JR Reid 3/68 (24 overs)		158 (75.5 overs); AR MacGibbon 31*; S Ramadhin 5/46 (26 overs)
		164 (f/o) (60.4 overs); JR Reid 40; AL Valentine 5/32 (22.4 overs)

West Indies won by an innings and 64 runs
Lancaster Park, Christchurch
Umpires: J Cowie and WJC Gwynne

- West Indies won the toss and elected to bat.
- 19 February was taken as a rest day.
- The match was scheduled for four days but completed in three.
- IM Sinclair (NZ) made his Test debut.
- SC Guillen made his Test debut for New Zealand, having appeared in five Tests for West Indies.

=== Third Test ===
3, 5, 6, 7 March 1956
(4-day match)
Scorecard

West Indies	v	New Zealand
404 (135.5 overs); ED Weekes 156; JR Reid 3/85 (32.5 overs)		208 (140 overs); JEF Beck 55; DS Atkinson 2/20 (12.2 overs)
13/1 (5.2 overs); BH Pairaudeau 8 AR MacGibbon 1/6 (3 overs)		208 (f/o) (106.5 overs); DD Taylor 77; DS Atkinson 5/66 (31 overs)

West Indies won by 9 wickets
Basin Reserve, Wellington
Umpires: LG Clark and WJC Gwynne

- West Indies won the toss and elected to bat.
- 4 March was taken as a rest day.
- RT Barber (NZ) made his Test debut.

=== Fourth Test ===
9, 10, 12, 13 March 1956
(4-day match)
Scorecard

New Zealand	v	West Indies
255 (166.5 overs); JR Reid 84; DT Dewdney 5/21 (19.5 overs)		145 (78.3 overs); HA Furlonge 64; HB Cave 4/22 (27.3 overs)
157/9d (80 overs); SC Guillen 41; DS Atkinson 7/53 (40 overs)		77 (45.1 overs); ED Weekes 31; HB Cave 4/21 (13.1 overs)

New Zealand won by 190 runs
Eden Park, Auckland
Umpires: JC Harris and TM Pearce

- New Zealand won the toss and elected to bat.
- 11 March was taken as a rest day.
- AT Roberts (WIN) made his Test debut.
- This was New Zealand’s first Test victory after 26 years as a Test-playing nation.
