= Roy Marshall =

Barbadian cricketer (1930–1992)

Personal information
- Full name: Roy Edwin Marshall
- Born: 25 April 1930; Saint Thomas, Barbados, British West Indies
- Died: 27 October 1992 (aged 62); Taunton, Somerset, England
- Height: 6 ft 0 in (1.83 m)
- Batting: Right-handed
- Bowling: Right-arm off-break
- Relatives: Norman Marshall (brother)

International information
- National side: West Indies
- Test debut (cap 72): 9 November 1951 v Australia
- Last Test: 15 February 1952 v New Zealand

Domestic team information
- Years: Team
- 1945/46–1952/53: Barbados
- 1953–1972: Hampshire

Career statistics
Competition	Test	FC	LA
Matches	4	602	75
Runs scored	143	35,725	2,190
Batting average	20.42	35.94	32.20
100s/50s	0/0	68/185	2/12
Top score	30	228*	140
Balls bowled	52	12,113	–
Wickets	0	176	–
Bowling average	–	28.93	–
5 wickets in innings	–	5	–
10 wickets in match	–	0	–
Best bowling	–	6/36	–
Catches/stumpings	1/–	294/–	16/–
- Source: Cricinfo, 5 January 2009

Roy Edwin Marshall (25 April 1930 – 27 October 1992) was a Barbadian cricketer who played in four Test matches for the West Indies and had an extensive domestic career with Hampshire in English county cricket. Marshall was born in Saint Thomas, Barbados. He made his debut in first-class cricket at the age of 15 for Barbados in January 1946, and three years later he established himself in the Barbadian side as an attacking opening batsman. After several strong performances for Barbados in West Indian domestic cricket, he was selected in the West Indian representative team. He played Test cricket between November 1951 and February 1952, making two appearances apiece against Australia and New Zealand. With several players surpassing him in the pecking order for Test selection, coupled with a disagreement with his teammates, he decided to end his brief international career and pursue a career in English county cricket.

Marshall joined Hampshire in 1953, and after completing his two-year residential qualification period he established himself as one of their opening batsmen. He would form a successful opening partnership with Jimmy Gray that spanned over a decade and was considered at the time the strongest in county cricket. He became a consistent and attacking opening batsman for Hampshire, and in 1959 he was chosen as one of five Wisden Cricketers of the Year. He was a member of the Hampshire side which won their first County Championship in 1961, and was appointed Hampshire's first professional captain in 1966. He held the captaincy until 1970, and retired in 1972. For Hampshire, he made 504 first-class appearances and scored 30,303 runs, a total for the county that is only surpassed by Phil Mead, who played for Hampshire between 1905 and 1936. In retirement, he moved to Taunton where he coached cricket at King's College and was a publican. He was appointed chairman of the Somerset County Cricket Club committee in 1987, a position he held until 1991, when ill-health forced him to step down. He died from skin cancer in October 1992.

== Cricket ==
=== Early cricket and Test career ===
The son of a wealthy plantation owner of Scottish descent, Roy Marshall was born in Farmers Plantation in Saint Thomas, Barbados. He was educated in Barbados at The Foundation School, where he initially developed his skills as a cricketer. Seeing potential in his son's skills, his father moved him to The Lodge School to further develop his cricketing prospects. By attending The Lodge School, considered one of the nurseries of Barbadian cricket, he was able to partake in the First Division of the National Men's League, the highest level of club cricket on the island. This enabled him to play alongside many of the leading Barbadian cricketers of the time. His success as a batsman for The Lodge gained him a place in a trial match for selection to the Barbadian team for their tour to Trinidad and Tobago; his scores of 72 and 80 runs earned him selection for that tour. Thus whilst still a schoolboy, Marshall made his debut in first-class cricket in January 1946, aged 15, against Trinidad at Port-of-Spain. On debut he struggled with nerves, making only 2 runs in the lone innings in which he batted.

He did not appear for Barbados again until 1949, playing in the interim for the elite Wanderers Club. Strong performances in club cricket led to his recall to the Barbadian team, where he met with immediate success in two matches against Trinidad at Bridgetown. In the first match he made a century (149 runs) opening the batting alongside Charlie Taylor, sharing in an opening partnership of 278 runs. In the second match, he made a second century (110 runs), which was also complemented by a half century (57 runs). His success continued the following season against British Guiana, with Marshall making 191 runs opening the batting. This earned him selection to the West Indian team for their tour of England in 1950, where he was chosen as a third opening batsman behind the Jamaican Allan Rae and the Trinidadian Jeff Stollmeyer. At 20 years of age, he was the youngest member of the sixteen-man squad.

On the journey across the Atlantic he contracted measles, and in England news reached him of the death of his father back in Barbados from a heart attack. Despite these hardships, Marshall played in twenty first-class tour matches, mostly against English county sides, scoring 1,117 runs at an average of 39.89. He made three centuries on the tour, notably scoring 135 runs against Hampshire at Southampton, which bought him to the attention of their captain and secretary Desmond Eagar. Despite playing well in the tour matches, he was unable to dislodge either Rae or Stollmeyer from the Test team. The following year he played in England in the Lancashire League for Lowerhouse, before returning to the West Indies to play first-class cricket. He was selected for the West Indies 1951–52 tour of Australia and New Zealand, where he made his Test debut against Australia at Brisbane on 9 November. Marshall scored 28 and 30 from the lower middle order, but did not feature in the 2nd Test. He returned to play in the 3rd Test at Adelaide, where a pulled muscle in his leg saw him bat with a runner for over 100 minutes. The injury subsequently kept him out of the 4th and 5th Tests. The tour then travelled to New Zealand, where Marshall played in both Test matches against New Zealand at Christchurch and Auckland. His four Test matches during the tour yielded him 143 runs at an average of 20.42, with a highest score of 30.

Returning to the West Indies, he played just once more for Barbados against the touring Indian national team in January 1953, but did not fare well in the match, making 25 runs in Barbados's only innings of 606 for 7 declared. With the emergence of John Holt, Conrad Hunte, and Bruce Pairaudeau, Marshall fell down the Test pecking-order. This, coupled with disagreements with senior Trinidadian members of the Test team, convinced Marshall to end his Test career and seek to further his career in England. Writing in 1998, Keith Sandiford opined that had he not decided to quit Test cricket at his peak, he may well have contributed more to West Indian cricket and provided a suitable opening partner for Hunte, who consistently lacked a reliable opening partner.

=== Move to England ===
==== Early years at Hampshire ====
After playing a second season in the Lancashire League for Lowerhouse in 1953, Marshall was offered a contract by Hampshire, just as he was on the verge of returning to Barbados; the contract offer came as a direct result of impressing Eagar when he played for the West Indians against Hampshire on their 1950 tour. Upon accepting the offer, Marshall began his two-year qualification period to play for Hampshire. Due to the qualification rules of the time, which required a player to be resident in the county he wished to represent for two years, he was unable to play in the County Championship. He could play in friendly matches, and thus made his debut for Hampshire against the Marylebone Cricket Club (MCC) at Lord's in 1953. In the same season he played against the touring Australians, making 71 runs in 85 minutes on a pitch described as "fierce", with Marshall striking five sixes during his innings. During the winter of 1953, he toured India with the Commonwealth XI led by the Australian Ben Barnett. He played in 17 first-class matches on the tour, scoring 761 runs, but did not score a century. In the absence of fast bowlers in the team, Marshall was utilised as a medium pace bowler tasked with swinging the ball; he bowled 254 overs, claiming 25 wickets. Whilst still waiting to qualify to play in the County Championship in 1954, Marshall featured in four friendly first-class matches. The first for Hampshire came against the touring Pakistanis, later playing two matches for the Commonwealth XI, which were separated by an appearance for the South in the North-versus-South fixture at Torquay.

Marshall completed his qualification period ahead of the 1955 season, making him eligible for the County Championship. As an opening batsman alongside Jimmy Gray, his batting played a large part in taking Hampshire to a third-placed finish in the County Championship, having finished fourteenth in 1954. In 28 matches in the 1955 County Championship, he scored 1,705 runs at an average of 34.79, making two centuries; whilst in all first-class matches, he scored over 2,100 runs. He also had success as an off-break bowler in 1955, taking 28 wickets at an average of 15.67. Against Yorkshire at Bradford, he took 6 for 44 to lead Hampshire to an innings victory. By the end of the season, he had topped Hampshire's bowling averages. The summer of 1956 was characterised by its wet weather, with Marshall taking time to adapt to the resultant wet pitches. As a consequence he was less successful, averaging under 30 across the season with the bat. Though he continued to excel with the ball, taking 36 wickets at an average of 20.55, which included career–best figures of 6 for 36 against Surrey at Portsmouth, on what was later described as a "responsive strip" by Sandiford.

Following the 1956 season, Marshall toured Jamaica with an ad hoc team managed by and named for the Duke of Norfolk. He was easily the most successful batsman on the tour, scoring over 1,000 runs across all fixtures, including 273 runs in the three first-class fixtures against Jamaica. In the 1957 season, he made an attacking century (107 runs) made in 66 minutes against Nottinghamshire in June; this was the fastest century by a Hampshire batsman since 1927. Later in the season against Surrey, he contributed 56 runs in Hampshire's first innings and 110 runs, made in 111 minutes, in their second. These scores were made as Hampshire were dismissed for 120 in their first innings and 153 in their second. Marshall scored 1,888 runs at an average of 32.55 during the season. However, Sandiford noted that he was hampered throughout it by having a tendency to give away his wicket when well established in his innings. He was subsequently selected to play in the season-ending North-versus-South and The Rest-versus-Surrey fixtures.

==== Wisden Cricketer of the Year ====
Marshall had a prolific season in 1958, with his batting assisting Hampshire to second place in the County Championship. He headed their batting averages, scoring 2,188 runs from 33 matches at an average of 39.22, making five centuries and eleven half centuries. Wisden opined that "Match after match, Marshall provided the runs which made victory possible". This was perhaps best encapsulated against Kent in late May, when Hampshire had been set 305 runs for victory, with just four and a half hours left in the match. He made 131 runs in 210 minutes, helping take Hampshire to victory by five wickets. Thereafter followed a series of strong batting performances by Marshall. A week after scoring 193 runs against Oxford University in June, his 122 runs made in just over two hours contributed to a five wickets victory against Gloucestershire. He made further quick-fire scores later in July, with 115 runs made in 123 minutes against Lancashire, and days later 138 runs made in 130 minutes against Nottinghamshire. In recognition of his performances in the 1958 season, Marshall was named one of the five Wisden Cricketers of the Year for 1959, alongside his teammate Derek Shackleton.

Marshall again exceeded 2,000 runs for a season in 1959, with 2,426 at an average of 40.43. As the season progressed, he formed with Jimmy Gray what Sandiford considered to be the most reliable opening partnership in county cricket at the time. Together, they established a Hampshire record partnership for the first wicket, with an opening stand of 214 runs against Gloucestershire; they would better this in 1960, with a stand of 249 against Middlesex. Marshall's quick run-scoring during 1959 was credited with Hampshire gaining 26 batting bonus points. (Note: Batting bonus points were awarded to a team based on their first innings batting performance. In the 1959 County Championship, batting bonus points were assigned as follows: 2 points for first innings lead; 2 bonus points for the side leading on first innings runs if they also scored faster on runs per over in their first innings at the time of passing their opponent's score.) He made several quick-scoring centuries, notably a match-winning 143 made in just under three hours against Yorkshire, and 133 runs against Oxford University, compiled at nearly a run-a-minute. In June, Marshall scored a quick-fire half century against Somerset, with Hampshire winning off the final ball, having been set 179 runs to win in two hours. He took part in the season ending Scarborough Festival, playing in the Gentlemen v Players match; as a paid professional he represented the Players, in contrast to unpaid amateurs who played for the Gentlemen. He played a match during the festival for T. N. Pearce's XI against the touring Indian national team. He toured South Africa with a Commonwealth XI captained by Denis Compton during the winter of 1959, but made only 100 runs in the three first-class matches that constituted the tour.

Marshall enjoyed another prolific season in 1960. He surpassed 2,000 runs for the third successive season, making 2,380 runs at an average of 41.75, with five centuries. His scoring method remained quick, with a century (127 runs) in 85 minutes against Glamorgan at Swansea in May. His century (111 runs) against Leicestershire in June was described by Wisden as "fast and graceful"; it was in June against the touring South Africans that he became the first West Indian to score 15,000 first-class runs. He was an instrumental part of Hampshire's first County Championship title in 1961, making 2,455 runs in the County Championship at an average of 43.83; he would make four centuries and 15 half-centuries in the Championship. His rapid run-scoring proved the difference between Hampshire drawing and winning matches, with a number of crucial innings during run chases at various stages in the season. He made the first double-century of his career, making 212 against Surrey at Bournemouth in July. He would end the season as Hampshire's leading run-scorer, in addition to leading their batting averages. In the winter, he took part in the International XI World Tour led by Richie Benaud and Everton Weekes that visited Southern Rhodesia, East Pakistan, New Zealand, and Pakistan.

Hampshire could not repeat their 1961 success the following season, finishing tenth in the County Championship. In June, Marshall was afflicted with German measles, which caused him to miss a number of fixtures. Despite this, he still managed to appear in 28 first-class matches and scored 2,124 runs at an average of 43.34. Amongst his six centuries in 1962 was his highest career-score, 228 not out against the touring Pakistanis in July. In the preceding month, he became the first West Indian to score 20,000 first-class runs, and with 32 first-class centuries by the end of the season, this constituted another West Indian record. He began the 1963 season by making his first-class appearance for the MCC. The weather was persistently wet during 1963, which had an adverse effect on pitches. As a result, most of the Hampshire batsmen struggled; however, Marshall was the exception. He scored 1,800 runs at an average of 34.61, contributing several important performances. He made 161 runs against Surrey in August, out of a total of 253 for 6 declared, whilst against Warwickshire he defied the bowling of Tom Cartwright and Albert Wright who had taken between them 15 wickets in the match, to score 124 runs. Marshall was a member of Hampshire's team for their inaugural appearance in List A one-day cricket against Derbyshire in the 1963 Gillette Cup.

In early January 1964, he played two first-class matches against Jamaica with the International Cavaliers. Marshall's 1964 season was restricted by injury to 26 matches, resulting in him scoring less than 1,500 runs in a season for the first time since 1956. He still made notable contributions, characterised by his quick-scoring. Against Derbyshire in May, he made his century (106 runs) before lunch. Against Glamorgan the following month he scored 102 runs in 105 minutes, in Hampshire's first innings total of 225, and later in the season against the same opposition he scored 163 runs in 217 minutes. A week later he made a century against Oxford University, his fiftieth first-class century. In September, he played for Frank Worrell's West Indian XI against an England XI, without distinguishing himself. Marshall's 1965 season was characterised by a struggle for consistency, with him converting only two half-centuries into centuries. His 29 matches saw him pass 1,500 runs for the season, though his average of 30.48 was lower when compared with preceding seasons. He made one of his two centuries against Oxford University, with his 125 runs in 102 minutes being the fastest first-class century that season. His century, which formed an unbeaten 190 runs opening partnership with Mike Barnard, was crucial in Hampshire's victory with 13 minutes left in the match.

==== Captaincy and retirement ====
It was announced in October 1965 that Marshall would be succeeding the retiring Colin Ingleby-Mackenzie as Hampshire captain, thus becoming the first professional to hold the post. Prior to his appointment, the captaincy had traditionally been held by a player with amateur status. With the abolition of amateur status by the MCC in 1962, the role of captain would be assumed by a professional. He inherited a Hampshire side that was entering a period of decline, having to contend with the retirements of both Ingleby-Mackenzie and Gray, and the decline in form of Danny Livingstone. In his inaugural season as captain, he led Hampshire to eleventh in the County Championship and to the semi-final of the Gillette Cup. Seemingly unburdened by the responsibility of captaincy, Marshall maintained good form with the bat. He scored 1,882 runs at an average of 36.19 in first-class matches, with three centuries. He recorded his maiden one-day half-century in the Gillette Cup quarter-final against Surrey, making 85 runs. In 1967, Marshall acquired a new opening partner in Barry Reed; together in mid-July, they would compile an opening stand of 233 runs against Northamptonshire, with Marshall contributing 160 runs, his highest score of the season. Marshall made 29 appearances during the season, scoring 1,493, though his batting average notably dropped to 31.76. He made his maiden one-day century against minor county Lincolnshire in the first round of the 1967 Gillette Cup, with 102 runs in 95 minutes.

Marshall moved himself to the middle order following a poor start to the 1968 season, allowing the newly signed South African Barry Richards to open with Reed. Despite passing the landmark of 30,000 first-class runs, the 1968 season was poor by Marshall's previous standards. From 31 first-class matches, he scored 1,208 runs at an average of 26.84, making only one century. He made his second one-day century in the Gillette Cup second round, making 140 runs against minor county Bedfordshire. A series of injuries in 1969, including a broken thumb which kept him out for two weeks, restricted his first-class appearances to just nineteen. As a result, he failed to pass a thousand runs in a season for the first time in his Hampshire career. In a season in which the one-day format was expanded with the introduction of the Player's County League, Marshall led Hampshire to a second-placed finish in its inaugural running, just one point behind winners Lancashire. His batting form recovered in 1970, with him scoring 1,590 runs at an average of 40.76. Whilst he made only two centuries, he did surpass fifty runs on twelve occasions. Against Middlesex in May, he scored an unbeaten 189 runs and established, alongside Livingstone, a new Hampshire record for the fourth wicket, with a partnership of 263 runs. In Hampshire's second innings, he scored a quick-fire 73, which he made in under an hour. Marshall captained Hampshire to the quarter-final of the Gillette Cup, in addition to playing in fourteen matches in the 1970 John Player League. In terms of runs scored, the 1970 season was to be his most productive in one-day cricket, with 442 runs at an average of 31.57.

In November 1970, Marshall was afforded a testimonial for the forthcoming 1971 season. He was removed from the captaincy by the Hampshire committee in December, being replaced by vice-captain and assistant-secretary Richard Gilliat. He remained at Hampshire following the loss of the captaincy, playing fluently in 1971. He scored 1,543 runs at an average of 38.57, making three centuries. He notably scored 122 runs against the touring Pakistanis at Portsmouth in May, despite having sprained his rib muscles. His seventeen one-day appearances yielded him 391 runs in 1971, with three half-centuries. Marshall made eighteen first-class appearances in 1972, but managed to score 1,039 runs at an average of 41.56. He made two centuries during the season, including a double-century (203 runs) against Derbyshire in mid-August. His fifteen appearances in one-day cricket saw him score 288 runs, with one half-century. Marshall announced his retirement in September 1972, at the age of 42. His place in the team was largely filled by fellow West Indian Gordon Greenidge.

==== Playing style and records ====
Marshall wore thick glasses throughout his career. Though he was not powerfully built, he was an attacking batsman, a trait he put down to learning to play on hard concrete and matting pitches at his father's plantation. His stroke play was characterised by good shot timing, which made up for what he lacked in physique. Marshall's attacking style, at a time when county batting was considered very defensive, made him one of the most popular county cricketers of the 1950s and 1960s. Discussing Marshall, John Arlott noted that "Few cricketers have had the quality to draw people to cricket grounds". With his stroke play, he was particularly adept at playing a late upper cut against fast bowlers, which would clear the fielder on the third-man boundary; however, he was known to avoid playing the hook shot against fast bowlers. According to Gideon Haigh, Marshall confessed to having a fear of fast bowlers and felt nervous facing them. Wisden opined that he "drove handsomely", and noted that he would take advantage when a ball was pitched on, or just outside, off-stump, by cutting or slashing with "devastating power". His unorthodox batting was demonstrated by his ability to cut sixes over point. Arlott observed that he scored the majority of his runs square of the wicket. When playing spin bowlers, Wisden remarked that he would insist on playing them from within his crease. Marshall was an accurate off-break bowler, but was seldom used later in his career, particularly when he began to become afflicted with arthritis. Such was his ability as an off-break bowler early in his career that A. A. Thomson considered him to be an all-rounder in 1956. Bridgette Lawrence and Reginald Scarlett remarked how he could be relied upon to break frustrating partnerships. His bowling was complemented by his ability to occasionally bowl medium-pace and leg-break deliveries. Sandiford considered him to have been a "brilliant fieldsman", who was renowned for his strong throw when fielding from the deep.

His captaincy method was often cautious and defensive, which contrasted with manner in which he batted. His defensive attitude drew criticism from Garfield Sobers, in a wider critique of the defensive attitude of some county captains. The negative aspects of his captaincy were also noted by Hampshire's Barbadian fast-bowler John Holder, who remarked that "It was one of the strangest anomalies of county cricket at the time that arguably the most forceful, entertaining, attacking batsman of his generation should have been one of the most negative captains". Wisden remarked how his "very keen cricket brain and strong opinions" added to the depth of his captaincy, but observed that despite possessing tactical knowledge and insights, these qualities did not ultimately lead to a successful tenure as captain.

In 605 first-class appearances during his career, Marshall scored 35,725 runs at an average of 35.94. He made 68 first-class centuries, and 185 half-centuries. In terms of runs scored, amongst West Indians he has the third-highest first-class aggregate, behind Greenidge and Viv Richards. For Hampshire, his 30,303 first-class runs are only surpassed by the 48,892 made by Phil Mead, who played for Hampshire between 1905 and 1936. With his off-break bowling, Marshall took 176 wickets in first-class cricket at a bowling average of 28.93; 99 of these came for Hampshire, at a respectable average of 24.27. He took five wickets in an innings on five occasions. In the field, he took 293 catches. Playing one-day cricket during its nascent years, Marshall made 75 appearances in the format, scoring 2,190 runs at an average of 32.20.

== Later life, death and legacy ==
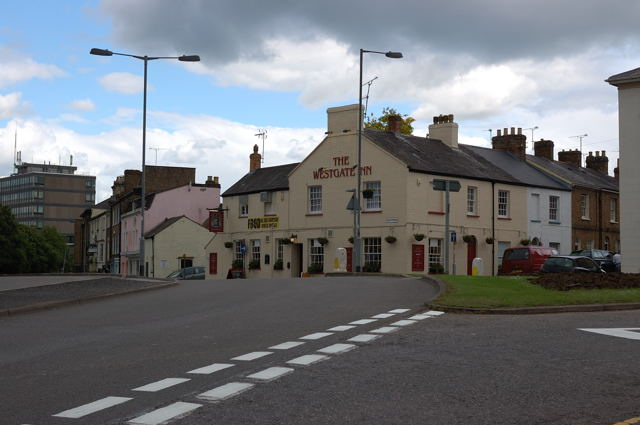
Marshall was the landlord of The Westgate Inn in Taunton (pictured).

Following his retirement, Marshall was afforded life membership of Hampshire and given a place on its cricket committee. After retiring from the professional game, he continued to play club cricket in Southampton for Deanery and would participate in cricket tours of a more social nature, while also finding time to adjudicate Man of the Match awards in one-day games. Besides retaining an active interest in cricket, he also took up golf, which he played with a good handicap. After a period of employment as a travelling sales superintendent, Marshall moved to Taunton. There, he coached cricket at King's College, where amongst those he coached were Richard Harden and Roger Twose. In 1978, he bought a pub in Taunton, The Westgate Inn.

Marshall was appointed, much to his bemusement, chairman of the Somerset committee in 1987. His appointment followed the 'Somerset Revolution' of 1986–87, that had seen Ian Botham resign and Viv Richards sacked. He remained chairman until he was forced to give up the position in 1991, having been diagnosed with skin cancer. The disease cost Marshall his right eye the same year, and as his health declined he was admitted to a hospice in Taunton, where he died on 27 October 1992. He was survived by his wife, Shirley, whom he had met playing in the Lancashire League, and their three daughters. He was also survived by his brother, Norman, who played a single Test for the West Indies in 1955, and his cousin, also called Roy Marshall, who was an academic lawyer and the third vice-chancellor of the University of the West Indies.

Four months prior to his death, he had been honoured by the Barbados Cricket Association during their commemorations marking 100 years of cricket on the island. At Hampshire's new home ground, the Rose Bowl, the main entry road into the ground was named in honour of both Marshall and another West Indian of the same surname, Malcolm Marshall. In 2015, an honours board was unveiled at the Rose Bowl by Trevor Jesty, honouring Hampshire's Wisden Cricketers of the Year.

== Works cited ==
- Arlott, John (1979). John Arlott's Book Of Cricketers. London: Sphere Books. ISBN 978-0-7188-2306-1 – via Internet Archive.
- Lawrence, Bridgette; Scarlett, Reg (1988). 100 Great Westindian Test Cricketers. London: Hansib. ISBN 978-1-870518-65-9 – via Internet Archive.
- Murtagh, Andrew (2016). Test of Character. Brighton: Pitch Publishing Limited. ISBN 978-1-78531-242-7.
- Sandiford, Keith A. P. (1998). Cricket Nurseries of Colonial Barbados. Mona, Jamaica: University of the West Indies Press. ISBN 978-976-640-046-0.
- Sandiford, Keith A. P. (2005). Roy Edwin Marshall: His Record Innings-by-Innings. Nottingham: ACS. ISBN 978-1-905138-15-9.
- Thomson, A. A. (1991) [1956]. Pavilioned in Splendour. London: Pavilion. ISBN 978-1-85145-658-1.
- Wagg, Stephen (2005). Cricket and National Identity in the Postcolonial Age. Abingdon-on-Thames: Taylor & Francis. ISBN 978-1-134-22719-8.
- Wilde, Simon (2013). Wisden Cricketers of the Year: A Celebration of Cricket's Greatest Players. London: John Wisden & Co. ISBN 978-1-4081-4084-0.

Sporting positions
Preceded by Colin Ingleby-Mackenzie	Hampshire cricket captain 1966–1970	Succeeded by Richard Gilliat
