= McWatt =

McWatt is a surname. Notable people with the surname include:

- Cliff McWatt (1922–1997), West Indian cricketer
- Mark McWatt (born 1947), Guyanese writer and educator
- Tessa McWatt (born 1959), Guyanese-born Canadian writer
- McWatt, fictional character in the novel Catch-22
