= Norman Marshall =

Norman Marshall may refer to:

- Norman Marshall (cricketer) (1924–2007), West Indian cricketer
- Norman Marshall (theatre director) (1901–1980), English theatrical director, producer and manager
- Norman Bertram Marshall (1915–1996), British marine biologist and ichthyologist
- Norm Marshall (1918–2008), Canadian radio and television broadcaster
