= Tom Dewdney =

Jamaican cricketer

Personal information
- Full name: David Thomas Dewdney
- Born: 23 October 1933 (age 93); Kingston, Jamaica
- Batting: Right-handed
- Bowling: Right-arm fast

International information
- National side: West Indies
- Test debut: 14 May 1955 v Australia
- Last Test: 13 March 1958 v Pakistan

Domestic team information
- Years: Team
- 1954/55–1957/58: Jamaica

Career statistics
Competition	Test	First-class
Matches	9	40
Runs scored	17	171
Batting average	2.42	5.70
100s/50s	0/0	0/0
Top score	5*	37*
Balls bowled	1,641	5,566
Wickets	21	92
Bowling average	38.42	30.73
5 wickets in innings	1	4
10 wickets in match	0	0
Best bowling	5/21	7/55
Catches/stumpings	0/–	6/–
- Source: Cricinfo, 30 October 2022

David Thomas Dewdney (born 23 October 1933) is a West Indian former international cricketer who played in nine Test matches between 1955 and 1958.

After only two first-class matches for Jamaica in 1954–55 in which he took three wickets, Tom Dewdney was selected to open the bowling in the Fourth and Fifth Tests against Australia later that season. He took 4 for 125 in the first innings of the Fourth Test, and was selected to tour New Zealand in 1955–56. He took eight wickets in the three Tests he played there, and "added to his stature as a promising new-ball bowler". He took 5 for 21 off 19.5 overs in the first innings of the Fourth Test in Auckland.

He took his best first-class figures of 7 for 55 against a Duke of Norfolk's XI composed mostly of English Test players in 1956–57, and was selected to tour England in 1957. He was reasonably successful in the first-class matches, taking 36 wickets at 27.05, including 5 for 69 against Gloucestershire and 5 for 38 (finishing the innings with a hat-trick) against Hampshire, but Roy Gilchrist and Frank Worrell were preferred as opening bowlers in the Tests, and he played only in the Fifth Test, replacing Gilchrist, who was sick, and taking one wicket.

He played three Tests against the touring Pakistan team in 1957–58, taking 7 wickets at 46.71. They were his last Tests, and his last first-class matches for two and a half years.

Dewdney was in the car driven by Garry Sobers when it collided with a truck and caused the death of fellow West Indies player Collie Smith in England in September 1959. They had all been playing league cricket in England that season. Dewdney and Sobers spent some time in hospital recovering from their injuries.

He toured Australia in 1960–61, taking five wickets in six first-class matches. After one festival match at Hastings in 1961, his first-class career was over.
