= Michael Frederick =

Michael Frederick may refer to:

- Michael Frederick (cricketer), Barbadian cricketer
- Minairo "Michael" Frederick, Australian rules footballer
- Mike Frederick, American football defensive end
