= Edun =

Edun is a surname. Notable people include:

- Adegboyega Edun, Nigerian leader of the Egba people
- Adetomiwa Edun, British actor of Nigerian and Ghanaian origin
- Alice Edun, singer of Nigerian-Russian descent
- Denrele Edun (born 1983), Nigerian television host
- Tayo Edun (born 1998), English footballer
- Wilfred Edun (1930–1990), cricketer from British Guiana
