= Barney Clark =

Barney Clark may refer to:

- Leslie Clark (umpire) (1903–1974), New Zealand cricketer and cricket umpire also known as Barney
- Barney Clark (patient) (1921–1983), recipient of an artificial heart implanted on December 1, 1982
- Barney Clark (actor) (born 1993), English actor
