= Leslie Walcott =

Barbadian cricketer

Personal information
- Full name: Leslie Arthur Walcott
- Born: 18 January 1894; Fontabelle, Barbados
- Died: 27 February 1984 (aged 90); Flint Hall, Saint Michael, Barbados
- Batting: Right-handed
- Bowling: Right-arm leg-break
- Role: Occasional wicket-keeper

International information
- National side: West Indies
- Only Test (cap 21): 11 January 1930 v England

Domestic team information
- Years: Team
- 1925–1936: Barbados

Career statistics
Competition	Test	First-class
Matches	1	12
Runs scored	40	555
Batting average	40.00	30.83
100s/50s	0/0	0/5
Top score	24	73*
Balls bowled	48	780
Wickets	1	16
Bowling average	32.00	29.50
5 wickets in innings	0	0
10 wickets in match	0	0
Best bowling	1/17	3/30
Catches/stumpings	0/0	8/1
- Source: CricketArchive, 9 February 2011

Leslie Arthur Walcott (18 January 1894 – 27 February 1984) was a West Indian cricketer who played for Barbados between 1925–26 and 1935-36 as a batsman, off-spinner and, in 1934-35, wicket-keeper.

In January 1930 he scored 73 not out against the MCC and was selected to play shortly afterwards in the first Test played at home by the West Indies, against England at Bridgetown. He made 24 and 16 not out and took the wicket of George Gunn. He was one of four players omitted for the Second Test, and played no further Test cricket.

He continued playing for Barbados until he was 42, captaining the side in several matches.

Walcott was born at Saint Michael Parish, Barbados. He was educated at Combermere School and Harrison College. In 1923 he became games master at Harrison College, and in 1932 moved to The Lodge School. There he made a significant contribution and coached several Barbadian players including Wilfred Farmer, Michael Frederick, John Goddard, Ken Goddard, Roy Marshall and Laurie Johnson.

Walcott died at Saint Michael Parish, Barbados at the age of 90. He was not related to Clyde Walcott.
