= Don Taylor (cricketer) =

New Zealand cricketer (1923–1980)

- Taylor in 1949

Personal information
- Full name: Donald Dougald Taylor
- Born: 2 March 1923; Auckland, New Zealand
- Died: 5 December 1980 (aged 57); Epsom, New Zealand
- Batting: Right-handed
- Bowling: Right-arm offbreak

International information
- National side: New Zealand (1947-1956)
- Test debut (cap 45): 21 March 1947 v England
- Last Test: 9 March 1956 v West Indies

Domestic team information
- Years: Team
- 1946/47–1959/60: Auckland
- 1950–1953: Warwickshire

Career statistics
Competition	Test	First-class
Matches	3	95
Runs scored	159	3,772
Batting average	31.80	23.28
100s/50s	0/1	1/22
Top score	77	143
Balls bowled	–	1,927
Wickets	–	32
Bowling average	–	33.21
5 wickets in innings	–	0
10 wickets in match	–	0
Best bowling	–	4/24
Catches/stumpings	2/–	62/–
- Source: Cricinfo, 1 April 2017

Donald Dougald Taylor (2 March 1923 – 5 December 1980) was a New Zealand cricketer who played in three Test matches from 1947 to 1956. His nickname was "Bloke", because of his frequent use of the word.

== Early life ==
Taylor was born in Auckland, where he attended Mount Albert Grammar School. He served as a driver with the New Zealand Army in World War Two.

== Cricket career ==
The New Zealand Test team, March 1947. Taylor is on the right of the middle row, next to the manager.

A middle-order batsman, Taylor made his first-class debut in 1946–47, when he scored 205 runs at 51.25 to help Auckland win the Plunket Shield. In their last match of the season Auckland needed 236 to beat Canterbury and were 76 for 4 when Taylor came to the wicket. He scored 98 not out in an unbroken match-winning partnership of 161 with Bert Sutcliffe. Later that season he made 12 batting at number five in his first Test, against England.

Taylor played for Auckland from 1946–47 to 1948–49, then as a professional for Warwickshire from 1950 to 1953, without establishing himself in the county side, then returned to New Zealand to play for Auckland from 1953–54 to 1960–61. Batting for Auckland against Canterbury in 1948-49 Taylor and his partner Bert Sutcliffe achieved a world record by taking part in two opening partnerships of over 200 runs in the one match – 220 and 286. His 143 in the second innings of this match was his only first-class century. His highest score for Warwickshire was 90 not out against Nottinghamshire.

Nine years after his first Test, Taylor was recalled to the Test team in 1955–56 against the West Indies after making 254 runs at 36.28 that season in the Plunket Shield. Batting at number four in the Third Test he made 43 and 77, top-scoring for New Zealand, and he was retained for the Fourth Test, which was New Zealand's first Test victory; Taylor made 11 and 16. He never played for New Zealand again, but John Reid, who captained the unsuccessful New Zealand team in England in 1958, thought Taylor should have been included in the team for his batting skill and experience.

After his playing career ended, Taylor served as a selector for Auckland in the 1960s. He was president of his club, Suburbs-New Lynn, at the time of his death in 1980.

== Personal life ==
Taylor and his wife Connie had a son and a daughter. He died suddenly in Auckland in December 1980, aged 57.
