= Apoorva Sengupta =

Indian cricket player. (1939–2013)

Personal information
- Full name: Apoorva Kumar Sengupta
- Born: 3 August 1939; Lucknow, United Provinces, British India
- Died: 14 September 2013 (aged 74); New Delhi, India
- Batting: Right-handed
- Bowling: Legbreak googly

International information
- National side: India
- Only Test (cap 89): 21 January 1959 v West Indies

Career statistics
Competition	Test	First-class
Matches	1	45
Runs scored	9	1695
Batting average	4.50	26.48
100s/50s	0/0	2/8
Top score	8	146*
Balls bowled	–	1231
Wickets	–	21
Bowling average	–	31.14
5 wickets in innings	–	1
10 wickets in match	–	0
Best bowling	–	6/32
Catches/stumpings	0/–	24/–
- Source: ESPNcricinfo

Lieutenant General Apoorva Kumar Sengupta (3 August 1938 – 14 September 2013) was an Indian army officer and cricketer who played in one Test in 1959. According to Christopher Martin-Jenkins, he was a "very good allrounder, right hand opening batsman, leg-break and googly bowler and slip field".

== Cricket career ==
Sengupta's only Test appearance came in the middle of a major controversy in Indian cricket. Ghulam Ahmed announced his retirement a few days before the Madras Test against the West Indies in 1958–59, and Vijay Manjrekar dropped out due to an injury. This led to a confusing situation where Jasu Patel, A. G. Kripal Singh, Manohar Hardikar and Sengupta were all considered. The captain Polly Umrigar wanted Hardikar but he could not catch the last flight from Bombay to Madras. Sengupta, originally a standby, was Umrigar's next choice but when R.K. Patel, the President of the BCCI, insisted that he pick Jasu Patel, Umrigar resigned the night before the match. In the end, Sengupta and Kripal Singh played. Sengupta opened the innings as Nari Contractor was unwell. He was caught at second slip off a bouncer by Wes Hall for 1. In the second innings while making only 8, he played a late cut and a drive off Roy Gilchrist.

He had made his first-class debut earlier in that season for Services against the West Indian touring team, scoring 32 and 100 not out. According to Dicky Rutnagur, he displayed a stern defence and marvellous temperament. He scored from deflections, and drives through cover and extra cover but lacked the strength. In the second innings, Sengupta struggled to spot the googly of Garfield Sobers. He was run out at the bowler's end by Rohan Kanhai. After the umpire Bapu Joshi gave Sengupta out, Kanhai withdrew the appeal as he did not have the ball in his hand when he broke the wicket. Sengupta completed his hundred in 270 minutes. This was one of the only three hundreds that West Indies conceded in the 16 match tour.

Two months later he took 6 for 32 against Delhi on his first appearance in the Ranji Trophy. These two performances had led to his selection for the Test match. He continued to play first-class cricket for ten years. His only other hundred was 146 not out scored against Bombay in the 1959-60 Ranji Trophy semi-final.

== Military career ==
Sengupta served as an officer in the Indian army and was awarded PVSM and AVSM. He rose to the rank of Lieutenant General (3 star). He was also selected to serve as the defense attache for USA and Canada, based in Washington DC.

After retiring from the Indian army, he lived with his wife Meena Sengupta in New Delhi. They had two children, Amitabh and Surojit Sengupta. Sengupta died in the R&R hospital in New Delhi on 14 September 2013.
