= Ron Archer =

Australian cricketer

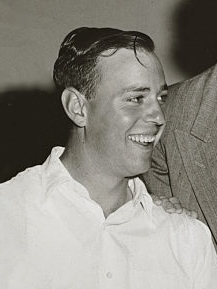
- Archer in 1954

Personal information
- Born: 25 October 1933; Highgate Hill, Queensland, Australia
- Died: 27 May 2007 (aged 73); Brisbane, Queensland, Australia
- Batting: Right-handed
- Bowling: Right-arm fast

International information
- National side: Australia
- Test debut (cap 193): 6 February 1953 v South Africa
- Last Test: 11 October 1956 v Pakistan

Career statistics
Competition	Test	First-class
Matches	19	98
Runs scored	713	3,768
Batting average	24.58	31.93
100s/50s	1/2	4/21
Top score	128	148
Balls bowled	3,576	15,618
Wickets	48	255
Bowling average	27.45	23.36
5 wickets in innings	1	9
10 wickets in match	0	1
Best bowling	5/53	7/56
Catches/stumpings	20/–	106/–
- Source: CricInfo, 10 June 2022

Ronald Graham Archer AM (25 October 1933 – 27 May 2007) was an Australian Test cricketer. He was born in the inner Brisbane suburb of Highgate Hill, was educated at Brisbane's Anglican Church Grammar School and played in 19 Tests from 1953 to 1956.

He was the younger brother of Ken Archer, who also played Test cricket for Australia.

A highly gifted all rounder, Archer's career was cruelly cut short by a serious knee injury in the one-off Test against Pakistan in Karachi in 1956 when he was just 23. A permanent fixture in the team from his debut against South Africa at Melbourne in 1952–53 until stricken by injury in 1956 Archer was a stylish middle order batsman and robust opening bowler. When England toured Australia in 1954–55 he topped the Australian bowling averages with 13 wickets (16.53). In the 2nd Test at Sydney he took 3–12 and 3–53 and his 49 was the highest score in the Australian first innings. After a slow start he excelled on the West Indian tour of 1955, recording 84 in Trinidad, 98 at Bridgetown and a maiden test hundred at Kingston to finish the series with 364 runs at 60.66. Showcasing his all round talent he took 18 wickets at 25.05 in England in 1956 but fell injured in Pakistan on the way home. Just before Australia went to South Africa in 1957, Archer worsened his knee injury by jumping off the roof a tanker at his Shell service station and withdrew from contention.

He played in 1958–59 as a specialist batsmen but though he averaged over 40 for Queensland his knee would not allow him to continue in the game. After retiring from the playing field he worked as a TV executive, became Cricket Australia's Code of Behaviour Commissioner and officiated as an International Cricket Council match referee. He was made a life member of the Queensland Cricket Association for his services to cricket.

Archer died of lung cancer in Brisbane on 27 May 2007.

Cricket Australia Chairman Creagh O'Connor paid the following tribute "Ron Archer had a brief and very successful Test career which was tragically cut short by an injury of the type that modern sports medicine would today probably have overcome...But while his international playing career was too short, he still devoted an energetic and cheerful lifetime of support to the game that he loved, contributing right up until his final summer."

On 12 June 1995, Archer was named a Member of the Order of Australia in recognition of services to the community, cricket and business. On 14 July 2000, Archer was awarded the Australian Sports Medal for his cricketing achievements. In 2009 Archer was inducted into the Queensland Sport Hall of Fame.
