= Boys' Town Cricket Club =

- One Day name: Beavers

Personnel
- Captain: Samalie Brown
- Coach: Ricardo McGeachy Snr

Team information
- Colors: Red and Black
- Founded: c1940
- Home ground: Boys' Town

History
- Senior Cup wins: 1960, 1970, 1973, 2003

Boys' Town Cricket Club is a cricket club based in the Trenchtown neighbourhood of Kingston, Jamaica. The club developed from the Boys' Town institution, a community organisation founded by Hugh Sherlock, a Methodist minister and writer of the Jamaican national anthem, to provide education and sporting opportunities for poor children. Boys' Town is considered a working class club that "drew talent that the middle-class clubs were not open to nurturing".

The West Indian Test cricketer Collie Smith played for Boys' Town before his death in a motor vehicle accident in England in 1959. The next year, the West Indian Test captain Frank Worrell led Boys' Town to victory for the first time in the Senior Cup—the premier cricket championship in Jamaica.

In 2003, the club won the Senior Cup for the first time since 1973.

== See also ==
- Boys' Town F.C.
