= Lennox Butler =

West Indian cricketer

Cricket information
- Batting: Right-handed
- Bowling: Right-arm fast-medium

International information
- National side: West Indies
- Only Test: 11 April 1955 v Australia

Career statistics
Competition	Test	First-class
Matches	1	11
Runs scored	16	161
Batting average	16.00	14.63
100s/50s	0/0	0/0
Top score	16	44
Balls bowled	240	2,276
Wickets	2	29
Bowling average	75.50	33.34
5 wickets in innings	0	1
10 wickets in match	0	0
Best bowling	2/151	5/89
Catches/stumpings	0/–	2/0
- Source: CricInfo, 30 October 2022

Lennox Stephen "Bunny" Butler (9 February 1929 - 1 September 2009) was a West Indian international cricketer who played in one Test match, in 1955.
