= Neelam Sanjiva Reddy Stadium =

Cricket ground in Anantapur, Andhra Pradesh, India

Coordinates: 14°40′41.80″N 77°35′25.11″E

Neelam Sanjeeva Reddy Stadium
- District College Stadium

Ground information
- Location: Anantapur, India
- Establishment: 1964 (first recorded match)
- Capacity: 10,000
- End names
- n/a

Team information
Andhra Pradesh	(1964–1986)
- As of 14 July 2014; Source: Ground profile

Neelam Sanjeeva Reddy Stadium or as District College Stadium is a cricket ground in Anantapur, Andhra Pradesh, India. Having originally been called the District College Stadium, it was later named after Neelam Sanjiva Reddy, the sixth President of India.

The ground first held a first-class match in 1964 when Andhra Pradesh played Madras in the 1963/64 Ranji Trophy. The following first-class match held there in the same year saw the Rest of India play Bombay in the 1986/87 Ranji Trophy. From 1964 to 1986, the ground held four further first-class matches, the last of which saw Andhra Prasdeh play Hyderabad.
