= Alan Clark (cricketer) =

New Zealand cricketer (1930–2017)

Personal information
- Full name: Leslie Alan Clark
- Born: 16 December 1930; Wellington, New Zealand
- Died: 21 September 2017 (aged 86); Auckland, New Zealand
- Batting: Right-handed
- Bowling: Right-arm medium
- Relatives: Barney Clark (father)

Domestic team information
- Years: Team
- 1955/56–1957/58: Wellington
- 1958/59–1959/60: Otago
- 1960/61–1961/62: Auckland

Career statistics
Competition	First-class
Matches	37
Runs scored	720
Batting average	15.65
100s/50s	0/1
Top score	68*
Balls bowled	6,735
Wickets	91
Bowling average	23.35
5 wickets in innings	3
10 wickets in match	0
Best bowling	6/29
Catches/stumpings	22/–
- Source: Cricinfo, 10 August 2025

Leslie Alan Clark (16 December 1930 – 21 September 2017) was a New Zealand cricketer. He played 37 matches of first-class cricket for Wellington, Otago and Auckland between 1955 and 1962. His father, Barney Clark, was a cricket umpire who also played two first-class matches for Otago in the 1929–30 season.

Clark was born at Wellington in 1930, the son of Leslie ("Barney") and Doris Clark. A right-arm medium-pace bowler and useful lower-order batsman, he played age-group cricket for Wellington sides from the 1949–50 season and played for New Zealand Universities before making his senior debut for Wellington in a December 1955 Plunket Shield match against Central Districts. Opening the bowling, he took 5 for 52 in the second innings on debut, and retained his place in the side for the remainder of the season. He played 14 times for Wellington over three seasons, including against the touring West Indians in 1955–56. He played in a trial match for the New Zealand Test team at the end of the 1957–58 season but did not play for the New Zealand team in international matches. He moved to Otago for two seasons, playing 10 times, before moving to Auckland in 1960. He captained Auckland in the 1960–61 and 1961–62 seasons. In his first match for Auckland he led the team to victory over Northern Districts, taking his best first-class figures of 6 for 29 in the second innings.

The demands of Clark's work in advertising prevented him from playing further first-class cricket after the 1961–62 season. After he retired from playing, Clark became a selector for Auckland.

Clark died at Auckland in 2017 after living in a nursing home for a period. He was aged 86.
