= Charles Palmer (cricketer) =

English cricketer

Charles Palmer CBE
Personal information
- Full name: Charles Henry Palmer
- Born: 15 May 1919; Old Hill, Staffordshire, England
- Died: 31 March 2005 (aged 85); Leicester, England
- Batting: Right-handed
- Bowling: Right-arm medium Right-arm offbreak

International information
- National side: England
- Only Test: 6 February 1954 v West Indies

Career statistics
Competition	Test	First-class
Matches	1	336
Runs scored	22	17,458
Batting average	11.00	31.74
100s/50s	0/0	33/98
Top score	22	201
Balls bowled	30	26,621
Wickets	0	365
Bowling average	–	25.15
5 wickets in innings	–	5
10 wickets in match	–	0
Best bowling	–	8/7
Catches/stumpings	0/–	147/–
- Source: ESPNcricinfo, 23 November 2019

Charles Henry Palmer CBE (15 May 1919 – 31 March 2005) was an English cricketer, who played for Leicestershire and Worcestershire from 1938 to 1959. He was born at Old Hill in Staffordshire. Palmer also played one Test match for England. He later went on to become a respected cricket administrator. He was awarded his CBE in 1984 for services to cricket in the Queen's Birthday Honours.

== Life and career ==
Palmer was a small man (five foot seven inches tall, only a slight build) with poor eyesight who played wearing glasses. Trevor Bailey joked that he looked "a natural for the role of a hen-pecked bank clerk in a farce". This did not stop him becoming a fine batsman and slow medium bowler because he "possessed deceptively strong wrists" which enabled him to play shots like the cut and drive with excellent timing. Palmer first played cricket for Worcestershire in 1938, before World War II and a teaching career intervened, although he still played a few games for the Bombay Europeans in Indian domestic cricket in 1946, with some games for Worcestershire. In 1948, he scored 85 in a morning's play against Don Bradman's Australian tourists (the "Invincibles") with Ray Lindwall and Keith Miller both bowling. Bradman praised his effort but it did not bring a test match selection at that time. Palmer did tour South Africa with MCC in 1948–49 but didn't play in any of the tests there.

He joined Leicestershire as captain and secretary in 1950, and passed 1,000 runs in each of the eight full seasons he played for them. In 1953, Leicestershire finished third in the County Championship, the highest they had achieved at that stage since entering the competition in 1895. As late as August that season, the team were top of the table for the first time ever and Palmer was praised as: "A leader without flourish, but indeed a leader".

On the back of this, he was appointed player-manager of the England tour side to the West Indies in 1953–54, which was captained by Len Hutton, and it was here that he won his only Test cap, making 22 and 0 and taking no wickets in the five overs he bowled. The series was played in bad temper, but Palmer's good-natured style helped the situation.

Palmer played two memorable innings for the Gentlemen versus the Players in matches at Lord's in 1952 and 1955, scoring 127 and 154 against some of the best bowlers in the country. In 1955, Palmer was responsible for one of the most remarkable spells of bowling in cricketing history. Putting himself on to bowl against Surrey to allow his main two bowlers to change ends, he took 8 wickets for 7 runs, with his figures at one stage being 12-12-0-8. Ironically, his figures were "spoiled" by Jim Laker whose eight for two in 1950 is the world record return by a bowler taking eight wickets. A catch was dropped from a swing by Laker which deprived Palmer of a nine for none return and Laker then managed to edge a few more so that Palmer finished with eight for seven. Even worse for Palmer was that Surrey still won the match by seven wickets.

A curiosity of Palmer's bowling was his fascination with what is called the "donkey drop". This is usually an accidental delivery that flies high because the ball has been released too soon. Palmer used it deliberately, sending it twenty feet or so high with the intention of it dropping behind the batsman and onto his stumps. It sometimes paid off and in 1957 when leading Leicestershire against the touring West Indians, Palmer claimed the wickets of no less than Frank Worrell and Rohan Kanhai with it.

After retiring as a cricketer, Palmer was appointed chairman of Leicestershire, he became a member of the Marylebone Cricket Club (MCC) committee, was President of the MCC in 1978–79, and chairman of the Test and County Cricket Board between 1983 and 1985. He died, at the age of 85, in March 2005.
