= Cliff McWatt =

West Indian cricketer (1922–1997)

Clifford McWatt
Personal information
- Full name: Clifford Aubrey McWatt
- Born: 1 February 1922; Georgetown, British Guiana
- Died: 20 July 1997 (aged 75); Ottawa, Canada
- Batting: Left-handed
- Role: Wicket-keeper

International information
- National side: West Indies

Career statistics
Competition	Tests	First-class
Matches	6	41
Runs scored	202	1,673
Batting average	28.85	28.84
100s/50s	0/2	2/7
Top score	54	128
Balls bowled	24
Wickets	1	2
Bowling average	16.00	52.50
5 wickets in innings	0	0
10 wickets in match	0	0
Best bowling	1/16	1/16
Catches/stumpings	9/1	45/6
- Source: Cricinfo

Clifford Aubrey McWatt (1 February 1922 – 20 July 1997) was a West Indian cricketer who played in six Tests in 1954 and 1955.

A wicket-keeper and useful lower-order batsman, McWatt made 54 and 36 not out against England on his Test debut in the First Test in Kingston in 1953–54, sharing seventh-wicket partnerships of 88 in the first innings with Gerry Gomez and 90 (unbroken) in the second innings with Everton Weekes. West Indies won easily. He played all five Tests in that series. The next season, he replaced Alfred Binns for the Second Test against Australia before being replaced in turn by Clairmonte Depeiaza for the Third Test.

He played for British Guiana from 1943–44 to 1956–57, and toured India, Pakistan and Ceylon in 1948–49 as the reserve wicket-keeper with the West Indian team. His highest first-class score was 128, for British Guiana against Trinidad in 1953–54.

McWatt moved to Canada in 1986, where he died on 20 July 1997 as a result of a car crash.
