= K. Woods =

West Indian cricket umpire

Umpiring information
- Tests umpired: 1 (1954)
- Source: Cricinfo, 17 July 2013

K. Woods was a former West Indian cricket umpire. He stood in one Test match, West Indies vs. England, in 1954.

== See also ==
- List of Test cricket umpires
- English cricket team in West Indies in 1953–54
