= Esmond Kentish =

Jamaican cricketer

Personal information
- Full name: Esmond Seymour Maurice Kentish
- Born: 21 November 1916; Cornwall Mountain, Westmoreland, Jamaica
- Died: 10 June 2011 (aged 94); Jamaica
- Batting: Right-handed
- Bowling: Right-arm fast-medium

International information
- National side: West Indies (1948–1954)
- Test debut (cap 65): 27 March 1948 v England
- Last Test: 15 January 1954 v England

Career statistics
| Competition | Test | First-class |
|---|---|---|
| Matches | 2 | 27 |
| Runs scored | 1 | 109 |
| Batting average | 1.00 | 13.62 |
| 100s/50s | 0/0 | 0/0 |
| Top score | 1* | 15* |
| Balls bowled | 540 | 4,375 |
| Wickets | 8 | 78 |
| Bowling average | 22.25 | 26.71 |
| 5 wickets in innings | 1 | 4 |
| 10 wickets in match | 0 | 0 |
| Best bowling | 5/49 | 5/36 |
| Catches/stumpings | 1/– | 6/– |
- Source: CricketArchive, 3 October 2019

Esmond Seymour Maurice Kentish (21 November 1916 – 10 June 2011) was a West Indian international cricketer who played in two Test matches from 1948 to 1954.

He was born in Cornwall Mountain, Westmoreland, Jamaica, and attended Cornwall College in Montego Bay,. and Mico Teachers' Training College in Kingston. He was Deputy Governor of the Bank of Jamaica.

== Cricket career ==
Kentish made his Test debut in the fourth Test of the West Indies vs England series in the 1947/48 season. He had match bowling figures of 3–106 as the West Indies won by ten wickets. He didn't play Test cricket again for the West Indies until the first Test of the West Indies vs England series in the 1953/54 season. He went wicketless in England's first innings, but took 5–49 in their second as the West Indies won by 140 runs.

Later he went to Oxford University to study at St John's College. He played 14 matches for Oxford University in 1956, taking 44 wickets at an average of 25.77. At 39, he was the oldest player to play in the University Match.

== Death ==
Kentish died on 10 June 2011 aged 94. At the time he was the oldest living West Indian Test cricketer.
