= Bill Gwynne =

New Zealand cricket umpire

Personal information
- Full name: William Joseph Chatten Gwynne
- Born: 28 June 1913; Dunedin, New Zealand
- Died: 10 November 1991 (aged 78); Invercargill, New Zealand

Umpiring information
- Tests umpired: 3 (1956–1966)
- Source: Cricinfo, 7 July 2013

William Joseph Chatten Gwynne (28 June 1913 – 10 November 1991) was a New Zealand cricket umpire. He stood in three Test matches between 1956 and 1966. In all, he umpired 24 first-class matches between 1956 and 1966, all but four of them at the Carisbrook ground in Dunedin.

Gwynne married Joan Isaac in the Dunedin suburb of Caversham in October 1937. He served overseas with the New Zealand Army in World War II. Joan died in Invercargill in November 1989, and Bill also died there, in November 1991, aged 78.

== See also ==
- List of Test cricket umpires
