= Wilfred Edun =

West Indian cricketer

Personal information
- Full name: Wilfred Khalil Edun
- Born: 30 June 1930; Georgetown, British Guiana
- Died: 17 June 1990 (aged 59); Georgetown, Guyana
- Batting: Right-handed
- Bowling: Right-arm medium-fast

Domestic team information
- Years: Team
- 1954-55 to 1959-60: British Guiana

Career statistics
Competition	First-class
Matches	7
Runs scored	136
Batting average	19.42
100s/50s	0/0
Top score	36
Balls bowled	834
Wickets	10
Bowling average	39.50
5 wickets in innings	0
10 wickets in match	0
Best bowling	3/28
Catches/stumpings	5/–
- Source: Cricket Archive, 13 September 2013

Wilfred Khalil "Sonny" Edun (30 June 1930 – 17 June 1990) was a cricketer from British Guiana who toured New Zealand with the West Indies team in 1955–56, but did not play Test cricket.

A middle and lower-order batsman and opening bowler, Edun made his first-class debut for British Guiana in the 1954–55 season. He made his two highest first-class scores, 36 and 33, in his first game, against Barbados. After three games that season in which he scored 125 runs and took 3 wickets he was selected to tour New Zealand.

He played only two first-class matches in New Zealand, taking 2 for 21 and 3 for 28 in an innings victory over Wellington. He played in most of the minor matches, with moderate success.

After the tour he played one game for British Guiana in 1956–57 and once more in 1959–60, with little success. He became a cricket administrator in Guyana.
