= Jaswick Taylor =

West Indian cricketer

Cricket information
- Batting: Right-handed
- Bowling: Right-arm fast-medium

International information
- National side: West Indies
- Test debut: 26 March 1958 v Pakistan
- Last Test: 20 February 1959 v Pakistan

Career statistics
Competition	Test	First-class
Matches	3	18
Runs scored	4	62
Batting average	2.00	5.63
100s/50s	0/0	0/0
Top score	4*	18
Balls bowled	672	2,879
Wickets	10	50
Bowling average	27.30	26.21
5 wickets in innings	1	3
10 wickets in match	0	0
Best bowling	5/109	5/36
Catches/stumpings	0/–	4/–
- Source: CricInfo, 14 January 2020

Jaswick Ossie Taylor (3 January 1932 – 13 November 1999) was a West Indian cricketer who played in three Tests from 1958 to 1959. On his debut, he took five wickets in the first innings against Pakistan in Port of Spain.

== See also ==
- List of West Indies cricketers who have taken five-wicket hauls on Test debut
