= Kenneth Furlonge =

Trinidadian cricketer

Personal information
- Born: 20 August 1937 (age 89); Trinidad
- Source: ESPNcricinfo, 14 November 2016

Kenneth Furlonge (born 20 August 1937) is a Trinidadian former cricketer. He played eighteen first-class matches for Trinidad and Tobago between 1957/58 and 1968/69.
