= Norman Marshall (cricketer) =

West Indian cricketer

Cricket information
- Batting: Right-handed
- Bowling: Right-arm offbreak

International information
- National side: West Indies
- Only Test (cap 89): 26 April 1955 v Australia

Domestic team information
- Years: Team
- 1940/41–1953/54: Barbados
- 1954/55–1955/56: Trinidad and Tobago
- 1956/57–1958/59: Barbados

Career statistics
Competition	Test	First-class
Matches	1	33
Runs scored	8	1,337
Batting average	4.00	30.38
100s/50s	0/0	2/5
Top score	8	134
Balls bowled	279	8,672
Wickets	2	90
Bowling average	31.00	31.72
5 wickets in innings	0	2
10 wickets in match	0	0
Best bowling	1/22	6/117
Catches/stumpings	0/–	6/–
- Source: CricInfo, 30 October 2022

Norman Edgar Marshall (27 February 1924 – 11 August 2007) was a West Indian international cricketer. He was born in the Welchman Hall Plantation, Saint Thomas, Barbados and played in a Test match against Australia in 1955. His brother Roy also played Test cricket for the West Indies and scored over 30,000 first class runs, mostly for Hampshire.

Marshall was an all-rounder who bowled off-spin and played in the middle order as an attacking right-handed batsman. He played most of his first class cricket for Barbados but appeared for Trinidad four times while he was working there in 1954 and 1955. His top score was 134 for Barbados against British Guiana in 1951–52, and his best bowling figures were 6 for 117 against Jamaica in 1946–47.

He played for the Wanderers Club in Barbados, and spent some time working and playing cricket in Peru and Venezuela after his first-class cricket career ended.
