= Sandy Lloyd =

West Indian cricket umpire

Personal information
- Full name: E. L. Lloyd

Umpiring information
- Tests umpired: 3 (1958–1960)
- Source: Cricinfo, 10 July 2013

E. L. "Sandy" Lloyd was a West Indian cricket umpire. He stood in three Test matches between 1958 and 1960. In all, he stood in seven first-class matches between 1956 and 1960, all of them at Queen's Park Oval in Port of Spain, Trinidad.

== See also ==
- List of Test cricket umpires
