= Leslie Clark (engineer) =

British engineer (born 1944)

Leslie Arthur Clark
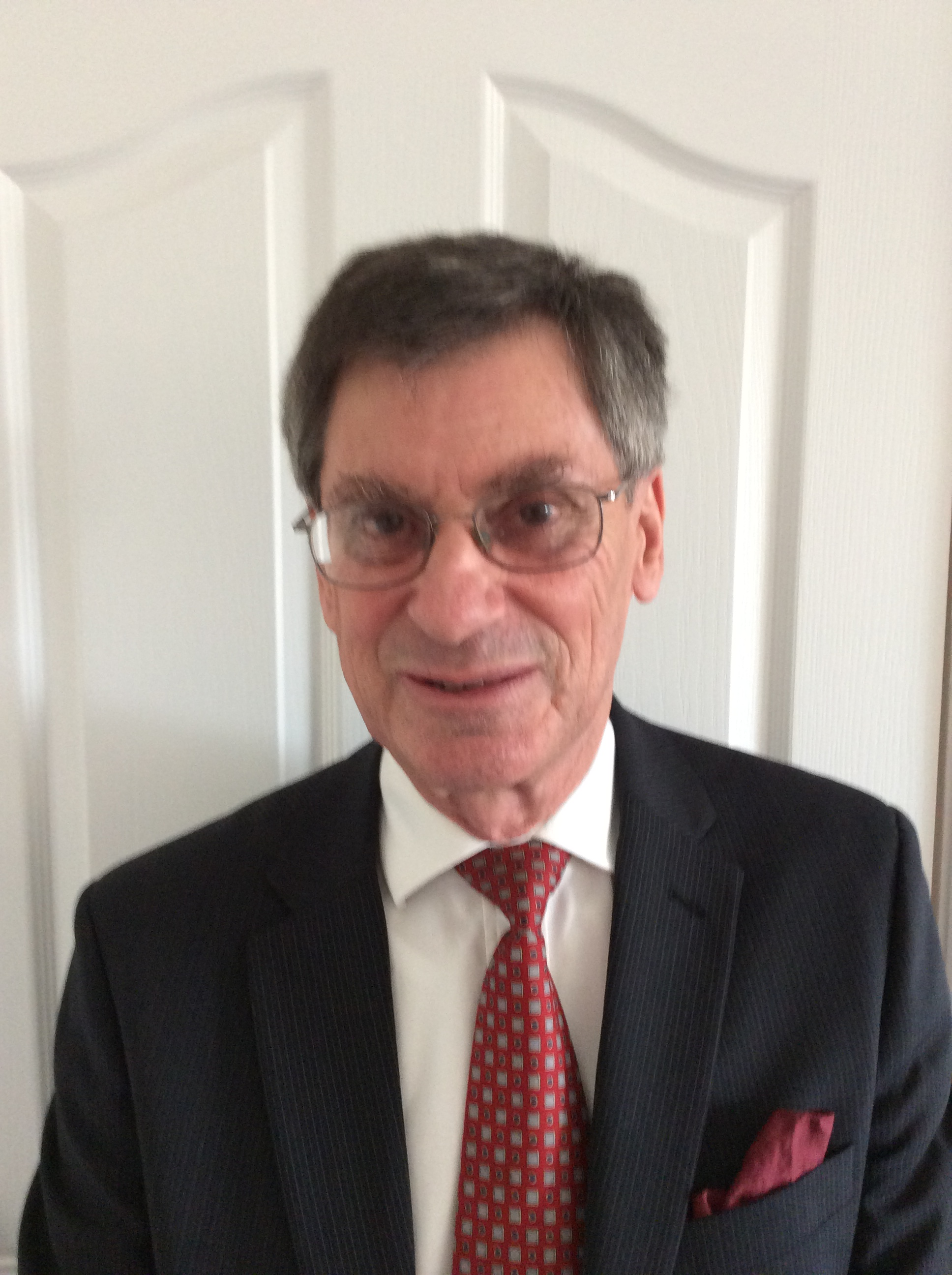
- Born: 1944 (age 81–82); Ilford, London
- Education: Ilford County High School. State Scholar, University of Sheffield
- Engineering career
- Discipline: Structural engineer
- Institutions: Institution of Structural Engineers; Institution of Civil Engineers
- Awards: Oscar Faber Award, Institution of Structural Engineers 1988

Leslie Arthur Clark is a British structural engineer born in 1944 in Ilford, London.

== Early life and education ==
Clark won a State Scholarship (UK) in 1962 to read Civil Engineering at the University of Sheffield. After graduating in 1965 he stayed at Sheffield to research for a PhD in very high strength reinforced concrete in collaboration with McCall & Co Ltd.

== Career ==
After completing his PhD Clark joined the Cement & Concrete Association (C&CA) (the Mineral Products Association since 2009). He worked as a researcher, consultant and lecturer mainly on concrete bridges and was involved with the development of the bridge design code BS 5400:Part 4. He was a visiting lecturer at the University of Surrey. In 1978 Clark moved to the University of Birmingham as a lecturer. He was promoted to Senior Lecturer in 1986, Professor of Structural Engineering in 1991, Head of Department of Civil Engineering in 2000, Dean of Engineering & Physical Sciences in 2002 and Pro-Vice-Chancellor for Estates & Infrastructure in 2005. He led a research team working on concrete bridge structures and helped to draft European Standard ENV1992-2. In 1998 he was asked by the then Construction Minister of the UK to chair an Expert Group on the thaumasite sulphate reaction in concrete.

Clark has been a Visiting Professor in Malaysia, an Honorary Professor in Hong Kong and was instrumental in negotiating the Institution of Structural Engineers agreement with the National Administration Board of Structural Engineering Registration of the People's Republic of China.

Clark was President of the Institution of Structural Engineers in 1998-99. He retired as Head of School and Pro-Vice Chancellor of Estates and Infrastructure in 2009 and became Chairman of the UK Certification Authority for Reinforcing Steels (CARES) in 2010.

== Awards and honours ==
- OBE 2000
- Mappin Medal 1964 University of Sheffield
- Henry Adams Diploma, Institution of Structural Engineers 1987 and 1990
- Thomas Telford Premium, Institution of Civil Engineers 1989 and 2007.
- The Annual Clark Lecture at the University of Birmingham is in honour of Emeritus Professor Leslie Clark

== Selected publications ==
- Clark, L.A. The provision of tension and compression reinforcement to resist in-plane forces
- Clark, L.A. and Thorogood, P. Serviceability behaviour of reinforced concrete half joints.
- Jones, A.E.K. and Clark, L.A. The effects of restraint on ASR expansion of reinforced concrete.
- Jones, A.E.K and Clark, L.A. The effects of ASR on the properties of concrete and the implications for assessment
- Williamson, S.J. and Clark, L.A. The influence of the permeability of concrete cover on reinforcement corrosion
