= Michael Frederick (cricketer) =

Jamaican cricketer

Personal information
- Full name: Michael Campbell Frederick
- Born: 6 March 1927; St Peter, Barbados
- Died: 18 June 2014 (aged 87); May Pen, Jamaica
- Batting: Right-handed
- Bowling: Right-arm medium

International information
- National side: West Indies
- Only Test: 15 January 1954 v England

Domestic team information
- Years: Team
- 1944/45: Barbados
- 1949: Derbyshire
- 1953/54: Jamaica

Career statistics
Competition	Test	First-class
Matches	1	6
Runs scored	30	294
Batting average	15.00	29.40
100s/50s	0/0	0/3
Top score	30	84
Catches/stumpings	0/–	3/–
- Source: CricketArchive, January 2012

Michael Campbell Frederick (6 May 1927 – 18 June 2014) was a Barbadian cricketer who played one Test for the West Indies in 1954 and first-class cricket for Barbados in 1944–45, Derbyshire in 1949 and Jamaica in 1953–54.

Frederick was born at Mile and a Quarter, St Peter, Barbados. He was educated at The Lodge School, well known as the cradle of cricket in Barbados, where he benefited from the coaching of Leslie Arthur "Bessie" Walcott. He played as a 17-year-old for Barbados in 1944–45, playing one first-class match against British Guiana.

He went to England in time for the 1946 season and played an assortment of friendly matches for Derbyshire. He played for the Swarkestone Cricket Club, and from 1948 to 1950 he played for Derbyshire's second team, alongside fellow Barbadian Laurie Johnson. Johnson played fairly regularly in the first team in the 1949 season, but Frederick played only two first-class games, in one of which he was top scorer with 84.

Frederick next appeared in first-class cricket in the West Indies in 1953–54, playing in two matches for Jamaica against the MCC tourists. He scored a 50 in each match, and was drafted as an opening batsman for the First Test against England in 1954 at Sabina Park, Kingston. He scored 30 in the second innings after a duck in the first innings, and West Indies won the match by 140 runs. Frederick was dropped for the Second Test, and did not play first-class cricket again.

He died after a fall. He was survived by his wife Eva, a sister of R. James deRoux, and their children Andrew, Charles and Catherine.

His cousin Robin Bynoe also played for the West Indies.
