= Willie Rodriguez =

West Indian cricketer

Personal information
- Full name: William Vicente Rodriguez
- Born: 25 June 1934 (age 92); St Clair, Port of Spain, Trinidad and Tobago
- Batting: Right-handed
- Bowling: Leg-break and googly
- Role: All-rounder

International information
- National side: West Indies
- Test debut (cap 117): 7 March 1962 v India
- Last Test: 19 March 1968 v England

Domestic team information
- Years: Team
- 1953/54–1969/70: Trinidad and Tobago

Career statistics
Competition	Test	FC	LA
Matches	5	64	1
Runs scored	96	2,061	6
Batting average	13.71	24.83	6.00
100s/50s	0/1	1/9	0/0
Top score	50	105	6
Balls bowled	573	5,787	–
Wickets	7	119	–
Bowling average	53.42	28.08	–
5 wickets in innings	0	8	–
10 wickets in match	0	0	–
Best bowling	3/51	7/90	–
Catches/stumpings	3/–	36/–	0/–
- Source: CricketArchive, 31 January 2010

William Vicente Rodriguez (born 25 June 1934) is a former West Indian international cricketer who played in five Test matches from 1962 to 1968.

Rodriguez was born in St Clair, Port of Spain, Trinidad and Tobago. After three first-class matches for Trinidad over five seasons, which included a century against the touring Pakistanis in 1957–58, Rodriguez was selected to tour India and Pakistan with the West Indian team in 1958–59. Apart from figures of 7 for 90 against Indian Universities he had little success with bat or ball, and did not play in any of the Tests.

He played in the Second and Fourth Tests against India in 1961–62, scoring 50 and taking 3 for 51 with his leg-spin in the Fourth Test at Port of Spain. His tour of England in 1963 was hampered by a cartilage injury, but after making 93 in over four hours as an opener against Yorkshire he was selected to replace Joey Carew as an opener in the Fifth Test, and made 5 and 28. He played in the Fifth Test against Australia in 1964–65, but without success.

From this point in his first-class career his batting fell away while his bowling improved: from 1965–66 to 1969–70 he made 507 runs at 18.10 with only one fifty, but took 69 wickets at 22.21, taking five or more wickets in an innings seven times. For Trinidad against the touring MCC in 1967–68 he took 6 for 51, and he replaced David Holford for the Fourth Test. He took four wickets, but England won, and he was replaced by Holford.

He took 5 for 42 against Windward Islands and 6 for 30 against Barbados in 1968–69, and in 1969–70, his last season, 5 for 12 against Guyana and 5 for 76 against Jamaica. All four performances were at Trinidad's home ground of Port of Spain. In all first-class matches at Port of Spain he took 67 wickets at 22.86.

Rodriguez also played football and represented the British Caribbean Football Association touring side in 1959. Crystal Palace F.C. described him as "a very versatile player specialising at Back and Centre Half (Stopper). Balanced, cultured, and an artist in the use of the ball, he is a model of constructive full back play."

He managed the West Indies cricket team that toured Australasia in 1979–80. The Australian leg of the tour was a success, but the New Zealand series, which New Zealand won 1–0, was marred by poor on-field behaviour by some West Indian players and poor decisions by the New Zealand umpires. Rodriguez complained publicly about the umpiring, claiming that it was heavily biased towards the New Zealanders.
