= Mohammad Yunus (umpire) =

Indian cricket umpire (1915–1992)

Personal information
- Born: 15 December 1915; Secunderabad, India
- Died: 16 November 1992 (aged 76); Hyderabad, India

Umpiring information
- Tests umpired: 5 (1958–1965)
- Source: ESPNcricinfo, 13 July 2013

Mohammad Yunus (15 December 1915 – 16 November 1992) was an Indian cricket umpire. He stood in five Test matches between 1958 and 1965.

== See also ==
- List of Test cricket umpires
