= Ghulam Guard =

Indian cricketer

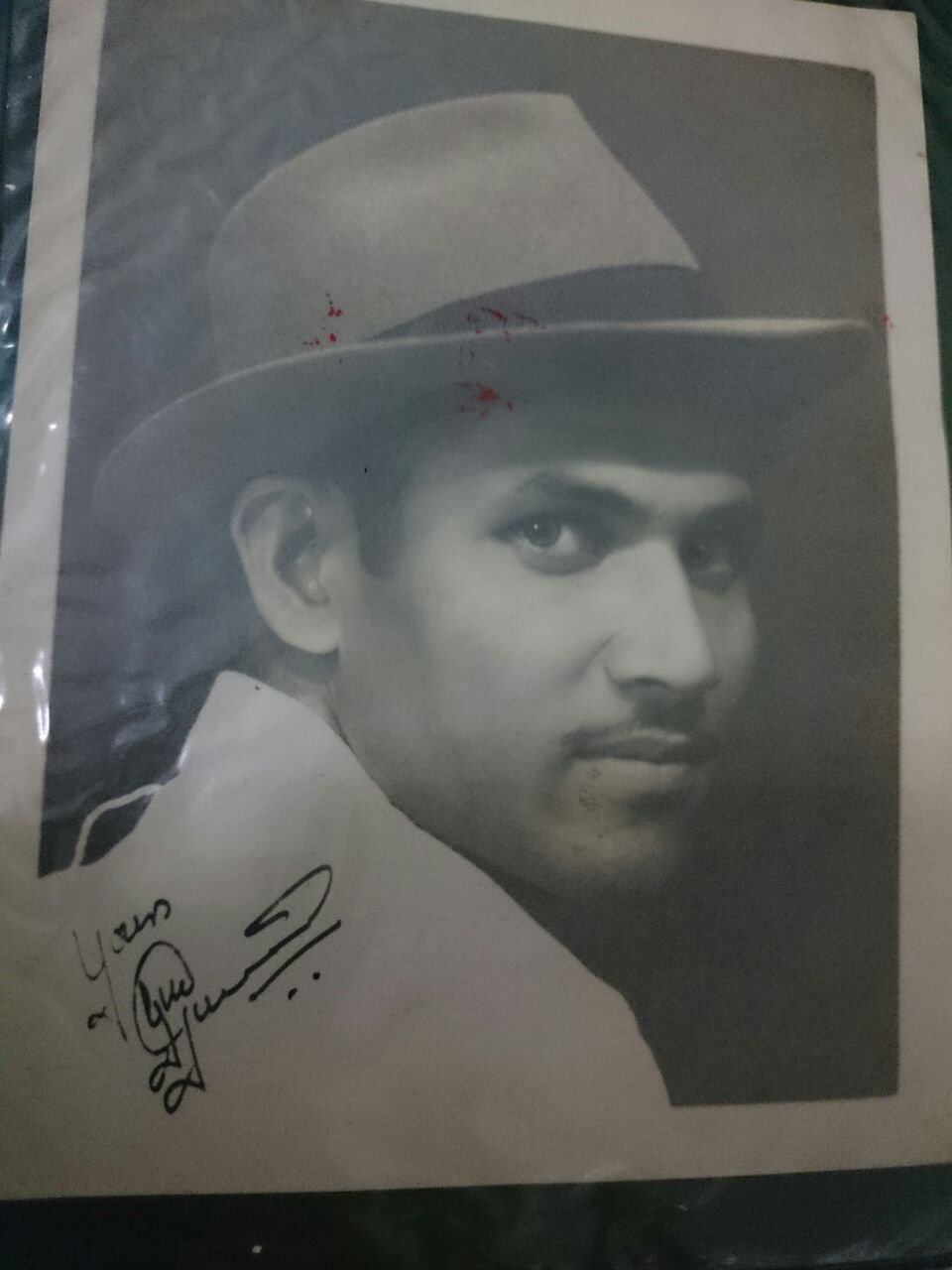

Personal information
- Full name: Ghulam Mustafa Guard
- Born: 12 December 1925; Surat, British India
- Died: 13 March 1978 (aged 52); Ahmedabad, Gujarat, India
- Batting: Right-handed
- Bowling: Left-arm fast-medium

International information
- National side: India
- Test debut (cap 84): 28 November 1958 v West Indies
- Last Test: 1 January 1960 v Australia

Career statistics
Competition	Test	First-class
Matches	2	41
Runs scored	11	238
Batting average	5.50	11.90
100s/50s	0/0	0/0
Top score	7	26
Balls bowled	396	5,920
Wickets	3	124
Bowling average	60.66	20.53
5 wickets in innings	0	9
10 wickets in match	0	0
Best bowling	2/69	6/46
Catches/stumpings	2/–	13/–
- Source: ESPNcricinfo, 20 November 2022

Ghulam Mustafa Guard (12 December 1925 – 13 March 1978) was an Indian cricketer who played in two Test matches from 1958 to 1960.

Ghulam Guard, 'a tall, high-shouldered man, who shuffled up to the wicket in twelve steps and ran the ball away from the right-handed batsmen at distinctly above medium pace, especially when fresh', was the first left-hander to open the bowling for India. At 6' 3", he was the tallest cricketer to play for India between Ladha Ramji in the 1930s and Abey Kuruvilla in the nineties. Guard bowled successfully in Indian domestic cricket for Bombay and Gujarat for more than 15 years from 1946 to 1947.

But he was almost 33 before he was picked for his first Test appearance, the first match against West Indies at Bombay (Mumbai) in 1958–59. He took three good wickets – John Holt (Jr), Conrad Hunte, and Gary Sobers – but was dropped for the rest of the series, and did not tour England in 1959.

Guard reappeared in the third Test against Australia in 1959–60, also at Bombay (Mumbai), but failed to take a single wicket and was again dropped. That season, his wickets, allied to a strong batting line-up, were instrumental in Bombay's winning of the Ranji Trophy, and he took nine wickets for 135 runs against Mysore in the trophy final. He took 31 wickets in the season at an average of 15.

He went on to become the Superintendent of Police in Gujarat.
