= Carl Furlonge =

Trinidadian cricketer

Personal information
- Full name: Carl Dominique Furlonge
- Born: 22 November 1932; Trinidad
- Died: 18 December 2015 (aged 83)
- Source: Cricinfo, 22 March 2016

Carl Furlonge (22 November 1932 – 18 December 2015) was a Trinidad cricketer. He played first-class cricket for Trinidad and Tobago between 1952 and 1971.
