= Commonwealth XI cricket team in India in 1953–54 =

International cricket tour

A Commonwealth XI cricket team toured India in the 1953–54 season and played 21 first-class matches, including five against an All-India XI. In India, the team was known as the Silver Jubilee Overseas Cricket Team, or SJOC, as the tour was arranged to mark the 25th anniversary of the Board of Control for Cricket in India.

Captained by Ben Barnett, who also kept wicket, the team had several well-known players, including Frank Worrell, Sonny Ramadhin, Roy Marshall, Peter Loader and Reg Simpson. The series was won by India, 2–1.

== Sources ==
- Wisden Cricketers' Almanack 1955, pp. 812–840.
