= Swaranjit Singh =

Indian cricketer (born 1932)

Personal information
- Born: 18 July 1932 (age 94); Amritsar, Punjab, India
- Batting: Left-handed
- Bowling: Right-arm medium

Domestic team information
- Years: Team
- 1950-51 to 1958-59: Eastern Punjab
- 1951-52 to 1958-59: North Zone
- 1954 to 1956: Cambridge University
- 1956 to 1958: Warwickshire
- 1959-60 to 1961-62: Bengal

Career statistics
Competition	First-class
Matches	88
Runs scored	3,709
Batting average	27.07
100s/50s	4/19
Top score	145
Balls bowled	13,525
Wickets	183
Bowling average	29.89
5 wickets in innings	7
10 wickets in match	1
Best bowling	6/20
Catches/stumpings	33/0
- Source: CricketArchive

Swaranjit Singh (born 18 July 1932) is a former Indian first-class cricketer.

Singh was a left-handed batsman and right-arm medium-pace bowler who played for Eastern Punjab and Bengal in India as well as Cambridge University and Warwickshire in England between 1950 and 1962.

Swaranjit Singh was educated at Khalsa College, Amritsar and Punjab University before going to England to study at Christ's College, Cambridge. While he was a student at Christ's College in the 1950s, he married a fellow student from Germany. Manmohan Singh, who later became Prime Minister of India, attended their wedding. Swaranjit and his wife Irmengard, who converted to Sikhism, settled in Amritsar.
