= Bruce Pairaudeau =

West Indian cricketer (1931–2022)

- Pairaudeau in 1963

Personal information
- Full name: Bruce Hamilton Pairaudeau
- Born: 13 April 1931; Georgetown, British Guiana
- Died: 9 October 2022 (aged 91); New Zealand
- Batting: Right-handed
- Bowling: Legbreak googly

International information
- National side: West Indies
- Test debut: 21 January 1953 v India
- Last Test: 25 July 1957 v England

Domestic team information
- Years: Team
- 1946/47–1957/58: British Guiana
- 1958/59–1966/67: Northern Districts

Career statistics
Competition	Test	First-class
Matches	13	89
Runs scored	454	4,930
Batting average	21.61	32.01
100s/50s	1/3	11/25
Top score	115	163
Balls bowled	6	76
Wickets	0	0
Bowling average	–	–
5 wickets in innings	–	–
10 wickets in match	–	–
Best bowling	–	–
Catches/stumpings	6/–	64/–
- Source: Cricinfo, 17 October 2022

Bruce Hamilton Pairaudeau (14 April 1931 – 9 October 2022) was a West Indian cricketer who played in 13 Test matches between 1953 and 1957. Born in British Guiana, he moved to New Zealand in the late 1950s.

== Early life ==
Pairaudeau was born in Georgetown, Guyana, on 14 April 1931. He was picked for his first first-class match for British Guiana before his 16th birthday, before scoring a century in his third match aged 16 years and five months. However, opportunities for first-class cricket were rare in West Indian cricket at this stage, and Pairaudeau went to England in 1950 to play Lancashire League cricket with Burnley.

== West Indian career ==
In late 1952, Pairaudeau returned to British Guiana and did well enough in two first-class matches to be drafted into the team for the First Test against India in January 1953. Batting at No 6, Pairaudeau scored 115 and put on 219 for the fifth wicket with Everton Weekes. For the remaining four Tests in the series he was promoted to open the innings and, though he made only one score of more than 50, he finished the series with 257 runs at an average of more than 32.

The following winter against the England tourists, though, Pairaudeau was picked for only two of the Tests, scoring 71 in the second match but failing in the fourth. When the Australians toured in 1954–55, he was not chosen at all.

Pairaudeau was selected, however, for the somewhat makeshift West Indies side which toured New Zealand in 1955–56. Lacking Clyde Walcott and Frank Worrell of the established West Indian batsmen, the side often struggled for runs, and Pairaudeau scored just 101 runs in six innings in the four Tests. The Fourth Test of the series at Auckland provided New Zealand with its first-ever victory in Test cricket.

Pairaudeau played on the tour of England in 1957. He hit 127 against Cambridge University and a career-best 163 against Hampshire, but in 31 other innings on the tour he managed fewer than 500 runs. He played in the First and Fourth Tests, but failed to get into double figures in his four innings. However, during the first innings of opening Test at Edgbaston, he did spend over eight and a half hours in the middle, despite being bowled by Fred Trueman for one run. He spent three and a quarter hours acting as a runner for Clyde Walcott, and then a further five hours running for Frank Worrell, who were both injured. This series was to be the end of his Test career, at the age of 26.

== New Zealand career ==
Having enjoyed his tour of New Zealand in 1956, and foreseeing unrest in British Guiana as it headed towards independence, Pairaudeau emigrated to New Zealand in 1958, settling in Hamilton, where he scored a century in his first club match. Shortly afterwards he began playing Plunket Shield cricket for Northern Districts. In his first Plunket Shield season he scored 50 or more runs in six consecutive innings. Consistent rather than spectacular – he scored only one century in eight seasons in New Zealand – he was a regular in the side for seven seasons. He captained Northern Districts from 1961–62 to 1964–65, and in 1962–63 he led them to their first-ever title in the Plunket Shield.

In 1958–59 Pairaudeau was the second-highest run-scorer in the Plunket Shield, with 412 runs in five matches, and in 1961–62 he was the leading run-scorer, with 380 runs in five matches. He became eligible to represent New Zealand in 1962, but his batting form fell away, and younger men were preferred for the Test team. He played his last first-class match during the 1966–67 season. He played Hawke Cup cricket for Waikato from 1961 to 1968.

== Personal life ==
Pairaudeau was married to Gillian until her death in August 2020. Together, they had two children. One of them, Toni, predeceased him.

Pairaudeau worked in insurance in British Guiana. After moving to New Zealand, he spent the rest of his working career with an insurance company in Hamilton. Pairaudeau continued to play club cricket until the age of 48. At the time of his death he was the oldest living Northern Districts player.

Pairaudeau died on 9 October 2022 after a brief illness, aged 91.
