= Ben Barnett =

Australian cricketer (1908–1979)

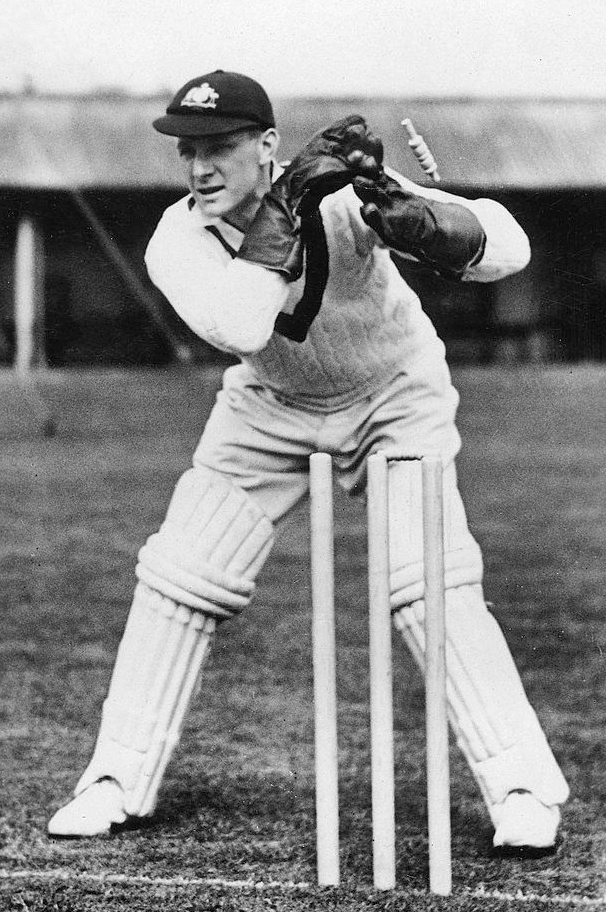

Personal information
- Full name: Benjamin Arthur Barnett
- Born: 23 March 1908; Auburn, Victoria, Australia
- Died: 29 June 1979 (aged 71); Newcastle, New South Wales, Australia
- Batting: Left-handed
- Role: Wicketkeeper-batsman

International information
- National side: Australia
- Test debut (cap 160): 10 June 1938 v England
- Last Test: 20 August 1938 v England

Domestic team information
- Years: Team
- 1929-30 to 1946-47: Victoria
- 1951 to 1964: Buckinghamshire

Career statistics
Competition	Tests	First-class
Matches	4	173
Runs scored	195	5531
Batting average	27.85	27.51
100s/50s	0/1	4/31
Top score	57	131
Balls bowled	0	24
Wickets	–	1
Bowling average	–	20.00
5 wickets in innings	–	0
10 wickets in match	–	0
Best bowling	–	1/3
Catches/stumpings	3/2	216/141
- Source: Cricinfo

Benjamin Arthur Barnett AM (23 March 1908 – 29 June 1979) was an Australian cricketer and sporting administrator. In a first-class cricket career lasting over 30 years, the pinnacle was appearing in four Tests appearances in 1938. After retiring from playing, he was an Australian representative on the International Cricket Conference (ICC) and served two years as president of the International Lawn Tennis Federation.

== Life and career ==
Barnett was educated at Scotch College in Melbourne. One of six siblings, he played cricket for Hawthorn-East Melbourne and Victoria during the 1920s and 1930s. He toured England as reserve wicket-keeper for the 1934 Australian Test team and his subsequent selection as principal wicket-keeper for the 1938 team attracted some controversy, other contenders being the ageing Bert Oldfield and the younger Don Tallon. Barnett played in all four Tests in the series.

Barnett's cricket career was interrupted by World War II, when he volunteered for the army and served with 8th Divisional Signals in Singapore. When Singapore fell to the Japanese in 1942, Barnett was incarcerated first in Changi Prison and subsequently in Thailand on the railway. Acting as adjutant for 8th Div Sigs, Barnett maintained records which are now held in the Australian War Memorial (Canberra) and also the Signals Museum in Wantirna, Melbourne.

After the war, Barnett settled in England with his wife Mollie and sons Ian and Ross. Working at the time for the Australian pharmaceutical firm Aspro-Nicholas, he played Minor Counties cricket for Buckinghamshire. At the age of 45, he captained the Commonwealth XI team that toured India in 1953-54. He played in 16 of the 21 first-class matches spread over four months, and played in all five of the matches against India. He played numerous matches for Commonwealth XI teams in England between 1950 and his last first-class match in 1961, when he was 53.

As an administrator he represented Australia in the UK for both cricket and tennis and was voted President of the International Lawn Tennis Federation in 1969, a position he held for two years. He retired in 1974, and returned to Australia. He was appointed a Member of the Order of Australia in 1977 for service to sport.

Barnett died in Newcastle, New South Wales in 1979 at the age of 71.

== See also ==
- List of Victoria first-class cricketers
