= Eric Lee Kow =

West Indian cricket umpire

Personal information
- Full name: Eric Nicholas Lee Kow
- Born: 1912
- Died: 7 April 1961 (aged 48–49); Port of Spain, Trinidad

Umpiring information
- Tests umpired: 9 (1953–1960)
- Source: Cricinfo, 10 July 2013

Eric Lee Kow (1912 – 7 April 1961) was a West Indian cricket umpire. He stood in nine Test matches between 1953 and 1960.

== See also ==
- List of Test cricket umpires
