= Perry Burke =

West Indian cricket umpire

Personal information
- Born: c.1920

Umpiring information
- Tests umpired: 6 (1954–1960)
- Source: Cricinfo, 2 July 2013

R. C. "Perry" Burke (born c.1920) is a former West Indies cricket umpire from Jamaica. He stood in six Test matches between 1954 and 1960. Overall, he umpired 14 first-class matches, all of them in Kingston, Jamaica, between 1948 and 1960.

During England's tour to the West Indies in 1953–54, Burke gave John Holt out lbw in the first Test in Kingston. As a result, Burke's family was attacked in the crowd.

Burke's father, Sam, was also an umpire.

Outside of cricket, Burke worked in a government printing office in Kingston.

== See also ==
- List of Test cricket umpires
