= Leslie Clark (umpire) =

New Zealand cricket umpire

Personal information
- Full name: Leslie Gordon Clark
- Born: 30 December 1903; Christchurch, New Zealand
- Died: 26 September 1974 (aged 70); Wellington, New Zealand
- Role: Wicket-keeper
- Relatives: Alan Clark (son)

Domestic team information
- Years: Team
- 1929/30: Otago

Umpiring information
- Tests umpired: 2 (1956)
- Source: Cricinfo, 3 July 2013

Leslie Gordon "Barney" Clark (30 December 1903 – 26 September 1974) was a New Zealand cricket umpire. He stood in two Test matches in 1956. He also played two first-class matches for Otago in the 1929–30 season. He was the father of cricketer Alan Clark who played for Otago and Auckland.

Clark was born at Christchurch in 1903 and educated at Lyttleton District High School. He played club cricket in Wellington for Midland Cricket Club before moving to Invercargill in 1929. He played as a wicket-keeper and was described as "one of ... the most outstanding cricketers" in the club side when he returned to Wellington in January 1930 where he captained Midland Cricket Club. He also played rugby union as a full-back. He had played both of his first-class matches for Otago during the 1929–30 season, making his debut against Auckland over the Christmas period before playing for the side against the touring England Test side over the New Year holiday. On both occasions he played as the side's wicket-keeper, scoring a total of five runs and taking two catches.

Beginning in the 1951–52 season, Clark stood as an umpire in matches in New Zealand. He stood in two of the four Test matches during the 1955–56 tour by the West Indies and in 1956–57 in two of the three first-class matches played by a touring Australian side against the New Zealand side. Overall he umpired nine first-class matches between 1953 and 1957. He continued umpiring at lower levels until 1970 and was the president of the Wellington Cricket Umpires' Association and, at the time of his death, president of the New Zealand Cricket Umpires' Association.

Clark died at Wellington in 1974, aged 70. An obituary was published in the New Zealand Cricket Almanack.

== See also ==
- List of Test cricket umpires
