= Eric Atkinson =

West Indian cricketer (1927–1998)

Cricket information
- Batting: Right-handed
- Bowling: Right-arm medium-fast

International information
- National side: West Indies
- Test debut: 17 January 1958 v Pakistan
- Last Test: 26 March 1959 v Pakistan

Career statistics
Competition	Test	First-class
Matches	8	29
Runs scored	126	696
Batting average	15.75	21.75
100s/50s	0/0	0/3
Top score	37	77
Balls bowled	1,634	4,197
Wickets	25	61
Bowling average	23.55	26.72
5 wickets in innings	1	4
10 wickets in match	0	0
Best bowling	5/42	6/10
Catches/stumpings	2/–	14/–
- Source: CricInfo, 30 October 2022

Eric St Eval Atkinson (6 November 1927 – 29 May 1998) played eight Test matches for the West Indies. He was the younger brother of Denis Atkinson, and the two were the third pair of brothers to play together for the West Indies. His first Test, against Pakistan at Bridgetown in 1957–58, was Denis's last.

Atkinson was primarily a seam bowler, taking 25 wickets in his one-year Test career. His best Test bowling figures came in against Pakistan in 1957–58, where he took 5 for 42 in the first innings of the Third Test – before Garry Sobers hit a Test record 365 not out and Pakistan went down by an innings and 174 runs.

He made his first-class debut for Barbados in 1949-50 and up to the end of the 1956–57 season he had played 11 matches for Barbados, scoring 411 runs at 29.37 and taking 5 wickets at 96.00. He struck form with the ball in first match of the 1957–58 season, taking 4 for 70 for Barbados against the touring Pakistanis.

He made his Test debut a few days later and from that point played only for West Indian representative teams. He played the First, Third and Fifth Tests against Pakistan. He toured India and Pakistan in 1958–59, playing three Tests in India and two in Pakistan, then retired.

In consecutive matches against East Zone and South Zone in India he took 12 wickets at 7.25, including his career-best figures of 6 for 10 when he and Wes Hall bowled unchanged to dismiss East Zone for 39. His highest score was 77 against E.W. Swanton's XI in 1955–56.
