= Denis Atkinson =

West Indian cricketer

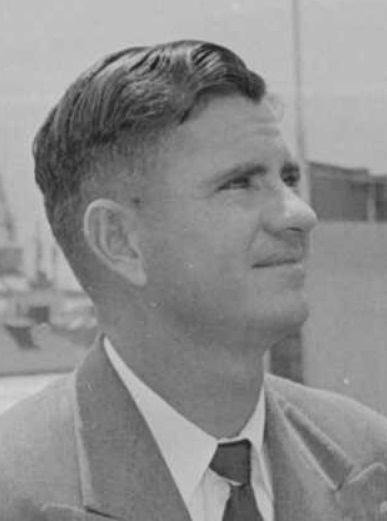
- Atkinson in 1956

Personal information
- Born: 9 August 1926; Rockley, Christ Church, Barbados
- Died: 9 November 2001 (aged 75); Barbados
- Batting: Right-handed
- Bowling: Right-arm medium Right-arm off-spin
- Role: All-rounder

International information
- National side: West Indies
- Test debut (cap 67): 10 November 1948 v India
- Last Test: 17 January 1958 v Pakistan

Career statistics
Competition	Tests	First-class
Matches	22	78
Runs scored	922	2,812
Batting average	31.79	28.40
100s/50s	1/5	5/14
Top score	219	219
Balls bowled	5,201	15,821
Wickets	47	200
Bowling average	35.04	26.45
5 wickets in innings	3	6
10 wickets in match	0	2
Best bowling	7/53	8/58
Catches/stumpings	11/0	39/0
- Source: CricInfo, 30 May 2019

Denis St Eval Atkinson (9 August 1926 – 9 November 2001) was a West Indian cricketer who played 22 Test matches in the 1950s as an all-rounder, hitting 922 runs and taking 47 wickets. He also played first-class cricket for Barbados and Trinidad.

Atkinson holds the Test record for the highest seventh-wicket partnership – as captain, he made a stand of 347 with Clairmonte Depeiaza against Australia in 1954–55 to put up a total of 510 in the first innings of a drawn match. Atkinson also led West Indies to a series win in New Zealand the following year.

He also holds the record for bowling the highest number of wicketless overs in a Test innings. He recorded 72 overs, 29 maidens, no wicket for 137 runs for the West Indies against England at Edgbaston, Birmingham, in 1957.

When Gary Sobers was a boy Atkinson encouraged him by asking him to bowl to him at practice. Atkinson, who played for the Wanderers Cricket Club in Barbados, was able to leave work at his insurance office early for extra batting practice, and he used to put a shilling on top of the stumps and tell Sobers he could have it if he knocked it off. Sobers said, "it was through him that I eventually received recognition". Atkinson's younger brother Eric also played Test cricket. Eric's first Test match, against Pakistan at Bridgetown in 1957–58, was Denis's last.

== Personal life ==
Atkinson was a fan of fishing and horse racing. He and his wife Betty had five daughters.

Preceded by Jeffrey Stollmeyer	West Indies Test cricket captains 1954/5 – 1955/6	Succeeded by John Goddard
