= Collie Smith =

Jamaican cricketer

- Smith in 1957

Personal information
- Full name: O'Neil Gordon Smith
- Born: 5 May 1933; Boys Town, Kingston, Jamaica
- Died: 9 September 1959 (aged 26); Stoke-on-Trent, Staffordshire, England
- Batting: Right-handed
- Bowling: Right-arm off-break
- Role: All-rounder

International information
- National side: West Indies
- Test debut (cap 86): 26 March 1955 v Australia
- Last Test: 31 March 1959 v Pakistan

Domestic team information
- Years: Team
- 1954/55–1957/58: Jamaica

Career statistics
Competition	Test	First-class
Matches	26	70
Runs scored	1,331	4,031
Batting average	31.69	40.31
100s/50s	4/6	10/20
Top score	168	169
Balls bowled	4,431	9,635
Wickets	48	121
Bowling average	33.85	31.02
5 wickets in innings	1	2
10 wickets in match	0	0
Best bowling	5/90	5/63
Catches/stumpings	9/–	39/–
- Source: CricketArchive, 4 September 2009

O'Neil Gordon "Collie" Smith (5 May 1933 – 9 September 1959) was a West Indian international cricketer.

A hard-hitting batsman and off-spin bowler, Smith was rated highly in West Indies. He idolised Jim Laker, for which reason he was nicknamed "Jim" for a time.

== Test career ==
In his third first-class match, he hit 169 for Jamaica against the touring Australians in 1954–55, and was immediately included in the side for the First Test. He started his Test career scoring 104 on debut against Australia. But after a "pair" in the next match, he was dropped. He returned for the Fourth and Fifth Tests, and finished the series with 206 runs at 25.75 and 5 wickets at 68.00.

He toured New Zealand in 1955–56, scoring 64 in the First Test and putting on 162 for the fourth wicket with Everton Weekes in 100 minutes. He was less successful with the bat in the next three Tests, finishing the series with 78 runs at 15.60, but his off-spin bowling brought 13 wickets at 18.53, including 2 for 1 and 4 for 75 in the Second Test.

In England in 1957, he scored 161 in the First Test and 168 in the Third Test, once driving Brian Statham into the car park. He was chosen as one of the Wisden Cricketers of the Year; in his citation, he was praised for his batting, bowling, and "magnificent fielding".

In 1957–58 he made 283 runs at 47.16 and took 13 wickets at 38.00 against Pakistan in the West Indies. In India in 1958–59, he scored 287 runs at 35.87 and took 9 wickets at 29.66. In the Fifth Test at Delhi, he scored 100 and took 3 for 94 and 5 for 90. In the three Tests in Pakistan he was less successful, scoring 81 runs at 16.20 and taking 3 wickets at 20.00.

== Death ==
During 1958 and 1959 he played for Burnley in the Lancashire League, where in 1959 he set a league record of 306*. He died from injuries sustained in a car accident in 1959 at the age of 26.

The accident happened at 4:45am on 7 September, while he was travelling with his West Indian teammates Garry Sobers and Tom Dewdney. They were driving to London to attend a charity match, Sobers being the driver. The trip had already been delayed because of the traffic. The car ran into a 10-ton cattle truck driven by a Mr. Andrew Saunders. The accident happened on the A34 near Stone in Staffordshire.

Smith was sleeping in the back seat and was thrown forward. His injuries seemed minor initially and Smith even told Sobers, in reference to Dewdney, "Don't worry about me. Look after the big fellow." But his spine was injured badly and he soon went into a coma. He died without regaining consciousness three days later. His body was taken to Jamaica, where 60,000 people attended the funeral. His tombstone in Jamaica's May Pen Cemetery is engraved: "Keen Cricketer, Unselfish Friend, Worthy Hero, Loyal Disciple, Happy Warrior." Sobers and Dewdney were not seriously injured, suffering lacerations and bruises.

Sobers was issued with a notice of intended prosecution. On 11 November at Stone Magistrates' Court, Sobers was found guilty of careless driving. The prosecutor said that Sobers had failed to take a bend and was in collision with a cattle truck travelling in the opposite direction. Sobers was fined £10 with £16 17s costs and had his licence suspended for a month. Sobers pleaded not guilty, claiming that he had been dazzled by oncoming headlights.

A biography titled The Happy Warrior was written by Ken Chaplin a year after Smith's death. He had the nicknames "Mighty Mouse" and "Wayside Preacher" because he liked reading the lesson in church.

The road passing Boys Town Club in Trench Town, Smith's birthplace, is named Collie Smith Drive in his memory.

== Notes ==
- Garry Sobers and Brian Scovell, Twenty Years at the Top
- Christopher Martin-Jenkins, The Complete Who's Who of Test Cricketers
