= Tom Ewart =

West Indian cricket umpire (died 1989)

Personal information
- Full name: Tom A Ewart
- Died: 28 April 1989
- Role: Umpire

Umpiring information
- Tests umpired: 7 (1948–1958)
- Source: Cricinfo, 6 July 2013

Tom Ewart (date of birth unknown, died 28 April 1989) was a West Indian cricket umpire. He stood in seven Test matches between 1948 and 1958.

== See also ==
- List of Test cricket umpires
