= Roy Gilchrist =

Jamaican cricketer

Personal information
- Full name: Roy Gilchrist
- Born: 28 June 1934; St Thomas, Jamaica
- Died: 18 July 2001 (aged 67); Portmore, St Catherine, Jamaica
- Batting: Right-handed
- Bowling: Right arm fast
- Role: Bowler

International information
- National side: West Indies (1957–1959)
- Test debut (cap 93): 30 May 1957 v England
- Last Test: 11 February 1959 v India

Domestic team information
- Years: Team
- 1956–1962: Jamaica
- 1962–1963: Hyderabad

Career statistics
Competition	Tests	First-class
Matches	13	42
Runs scored	60	258
Batting average	5.45	7.81
100s/50s	0/0	0/0
Top score	12	43 not out
Balls bowled	3,227	8,391
Wickets	57	167
Bowling average	26.68	26.00
5 wickets in innings	1	7
10 wickets in match	0	1
Best bowling	6/55	6/16
Catches/stumpings	4/–	10/–
- Source: Cricinfo, 3 March 2009

Roy Gilchrist (28 June 1934 – 18 July 2001) was a Jamaican cricketer who played 13 Tests for the West Indies in the 1950s. He was born in Saint Thomas, Jamaica and died of Parkinson's disease in St Catherine, Jamaica at the age of 67.

Gilchrist's Test career might have been longer had he not been sent home halfway through West Indies' 1958–59 tour of the Indian subcontinent after disagreements with captain Gerry Alexander. One cause of this was Gilchrist's "penchant for bowling beamers from 18 yards" as Cricinfo has put it, as well as off-field arguments. This involved deliberately overstepping the bowling mark by four yards to come closer to the batsman and intimidate him. In the Fourth Test at Nagpur, after Indian batsman A. G. Kripal Singh had struck three consecutive boundaries and taunted him, Gilchrist deliberately overstepped the bowling mark by six metres and delivered a bouncer which hit the Sikh batsman on the head, dislodging his turban.

In the following match, against North Zone, Gilchrist unleashed a barrage of beamers against Swaranjit Singh, whom Alexander had known at Cambridge. He ignored his captain's instruction to cease this form of attack. During the lunch interval Alexander substituted him, and he was subsequently sent home, while the other players proceeded to Pakistan for the remainder of the tour. Alexander told him: "You will leave by the next flight. Good afternoon". This marked the end of his Test career. There were suggestions that he had pulled a knife on Alexander.

He later attracted attention while playing in the Lancashire League by removing a stump from the playing arena and striking an opposition batsman in the head.

Gilchrist was said to be one of only four bowlers ever to have actually hit the sightscreen after first bounce on the pitch, on the full. (There is some doubt about this, as the scorebook for the match in question, however, showed only three extras).

After the end of Gilchrist's Test career he spent many years playing in the English Lancashire League. He was successful there, reaching 100 wickets each season until 1979, but there were continued stories of his violent temper. In 1967, Gilchrist was sentenced to three months' probation after attacking his wife Novlyn during an argument. The judge in the case said: "I hate to think English sport has sunk so far that brutes will be tolerated because they are good at games."
