= Clairmonte Depeiaza =

West Indian cricketer (1928–1995)

Cricket information
- Batting: Right-handed
- Bowling: Right-arm unknown

International information
- National side: West Indies
- Test debut (cap 88): 26 April 1955 v Australia
- Last Test: 18 February 1956 v New Zealand

Domestic team information
- Years: Team
- 1951/52–1956/57: Barbados

Career statistics
Competition	Test	First-class
Matches	5	16
Runs scored	187	623
Batting average	31.16	32.78
100s/50s	1/-	1/4
Top score	122	122
Balls bowled	30	30
Wickets	0	0
Bowling average	–	–
5 wickets in innings	–	–
10 wickets in match	–	–
Best bowling	–	–
Catches/stumpings	7/4	31/9
- Source: , 15 August 2022

Cyril Clairmonte Depeiaza (10 October 1928 – 10 November 1995) was a West Indian cricketer.

Depeiaza was born in Mount Standfast, Saint James Parish, Barbados. A wicketkeeper, he played in the Barbados Cricket League. He played first-class cricket for Barbados from 1951–52 to 1956–57, and toured New Zealand with the West Indian team in 1955–56. He played the last three Tests against Australia in 1954–55, and the first two against New Zealand in 1955–56. In the first Test of the New Zealand tour he did not keep wicket – Alfie Binns was preferred – and he bowled for the only time in his first-class career.

In a brief international Test career, he is best known for a world Test record 7th wicket partnership with Denis Atkinson of 347 in which he made his only first-class hundred of 122. The pair came together with the score at 147 for 6 in reply to Australia's first innings of 668. Their partnership record still stands.

During the partnership he was hit on the chest numerous times by short balls from Keith Miller and Ray Lindwall, leading to a suggestion from the father of his Barbados team-mate John Goddard that he wear a piece of protective foam rubber around his chest. This was the first known instance of a chest protector used in Test cricket. Following the innings, the crowd collected $1000 for him.

Nicknamed "The Leaning Tower of Depeiaza" because of the way he leaned forward in his defensive shots, Depeiaza worked as a customs clerk. He moved to England and played league for Heywood, Stockport and Minor Counties cricket in the 1960s and 1970s. He died in 1995 at Manchester, England.

== Sources ==
- Sobers, G. (1988) Twenty Years at the Top, MacMillan London, ISBN 978-0-330-30868-7.
