= Wing Gillette =

West Indian cricket umpire

Personal information
- Full name: E. S. Gillette
- Born: 1916 or 1917; British Guiana
- Died: 8 September 1996 (aged 79); Florida, United States

Umpiring information
- Tests umpired: 5 (1948–1958)
- Source: Cricinfo, 6 July 2013

E. S. "Wing" Gillette (born 1916 or 1917, died 8 September 1996) was a cricket umpire from British Guiana. He stood in five Test matches played by West Indies between 1948 and 1958. He umpired 14 first-class matches, all of them at the Bourda ground in Georgetown, between October 1947 and March 1958.

Gillette, of Chinese background, worked as a commission agent in Georgetown. He captained the British Guiana cricket club in Georgetown until he retired from playing in 1954 in order to concentrate on umpiring. He later moved to Florida, where he lived in Orlando and worked as an importer. He died there in September 1996, aged 79, survived by three daughters.

== See also ==
- List of Test cricket umpires
