= International cricket in 1960–61 =

International cricket season

The 1960–61 international cricket season was from September 1960 to April 1961.

== Season overview ==
International tours
Start date	Home team	Away team	Results [Matches]			
Start date	Home team	Away team	Test	ODI	FC	LA
23 September 1960	Ceylon	Pakistan	—	—	0–0 [1]	—
2 December 1960	India	Pakistan	0–0 [5]	—	—	—
9 December 1960	Australia	West Indies	2–1 [5]	—	—	—
24 February 1962	New Zealand	Marylebone	—	—	0–1 [1]	—
17 March 1961	Ceylon	India	—	—	1–0 [1]	—

== September ==
=== Pakistan in Ceylon ===
First-class Match
No.	Date	Home captain	Away captain	Venue	Result
FC Match	23–25 September	Conroy Gunasekera	Shujauddin Butt	P Saravanamuttu Stadium, Colombo	Match drawn

== December ==
=== Pakistan in India ===
Test series
No.	Date	Home captain	Away captain	Venue	Result
Test 497	2–7 December	Nari Contractor	Fazal Mahmood	Brabourne Stadium, Bombay	Match drawn
Test 499	16–21 December	Nari Contractor	Fazal Mahmood	Green Park, Kanpur	Match drawn
Test 501	30 Dec–4 January	Nari Contractor	Fazal Mahmood	Eden Gardens, Calcutta	Match drawn
Test 503	13–18 January	Nari Contractor	Fazal Mahmood	Corporation Stadium, Madras	Match drawn
Test 505	8–13 February	Nari Contractor	Fazal Mahmood	Feroz Shah Kotla Ground, Delhi	Match drawn

=== West Indies in Australia ===
Frank Worrell Trophy Test series
No.	Date	Home captain	Away captain	Venue	Result
Test 498	6–11 December	Richie Benaud	Frank Worrell	The Gabba, Brisbane	Match tied
Test 500	1–6 January	Richie Benaud	Frank Worrell	Melbourne Cricket Ground, Melbourne	Australia by 7 wickets
Test 502	10–15 January	Richie Benaud	Frank Worrell	Sydney Cricket Ground, Sydney	West Indies by 222 runs
Test 504	24–29 January	Richie Benaud	Frank Worrell	Adelaide Oval, Adelaide	Match drawn
Test 506	7–12 February	Richie Benaud	Frank Worrell	Melbourne Cricket Ground, Melbourne	Australia by 2 wickets

== February ==
=== MCC in New Zealand ===
First-class Match
No.	Date	Home captain	Away captain	Venue	Result
FC Match	24–27 February	Lord Cobham	Dennis Silk	Eden Park, Auckland	Marylebone by 25 runs

== March ==
=== India in Ceylon ===
MJ Gopalan Trophy
No.	Date	Home captain	Away captain	Venue	Result
FC Match	17–19 March	Conroy Gunasekera	Kripal Singh	P Saravanamuttu Stadium, Colombo	Ceylon by 160 runs
