= International cricket in 1957–58 =

International cricket season

The 1957–58 international cricket season was from September 1957 to April 1958.

== Season overview ==
International tours
Start date	Home team	Away team	Results [Matches]			
Start date	Home team	Away team	Test	ODI	FC	LA
23 December 1957	South Africa	Australia	0–3 [5]	—	—	—
17 January 1958	West Indies	Pakistan	3–1 [5]	—	—	—
14 March 1958	India	Ceylon	—	—	1–0 [1]	—

== December ==
=== Australia in South Africa ===
Test series
No.	Date	Home captain	Away captain	Venue	Result
Test 444	23–28 December	Jackie McGlew	Ian Craig	New Wanderers Stadium, Johannesburg	Match drawn
Test 445	31 Jan–3 January	Clive van Ryneveld	Ian Craig	Newlands, Cape Town	Australia by an innings and 141 runs
Test 447	24–29 January	Clive van Ryneveld	Ian Craig	Kingsmead, Durban	Match drawn
Test 449	7–12 February	Clive van Ryneveld	Ian Craig	New Wanderers Stadium, Johannesburg	Australia by 10 wickets
Test 451	28 Feb–4 March	Clive van Ryneveld	Ian Craig	Crusaders Ground, Port Elizabeth	Australia by 8 wickets

== January ==
=== Pakistan in the West Indies ===
Test Series
No.	Date	Home captain	Away captain	Venue	Result
Test 446	17–23 January	Gerry Alexander	Abdul Kardar	Kensington Oval, Bridgetown	Match drawn
Test 448	5–11 February	Gerry Alexander	Abdul Kardar	Queen's Park Oval, Port of Spain	West Indies by 120 runs
Test 450	26 Feb–4 March	Gerry Alexander	Abdul Kardar	Sabina Park, Kingston	West Indies by an innings and 174 runs
Test 452	13–19 March	Gerry Alexander	Abdul Kardar	Bourda, Georgetown	West Indies by 8 wickets
Test 453	26–31 March	Gerry Alexander	Abdul Kardar	Queen's Park Oval, Port of Spain	Pakistan by an innings and 1 run

== March ==
=== Ceylon in India ===
MJ Gopalan Trophy
No.	Date	Home captain	Away captain	Venue	Result
FC Match	14–16 March	Coimbatarao Gopinath	Vernon Prins	Kajamalai Stadium, Tiruchi	India by 2 wickets
First class match
No.	Date	Home captain	Away captain	Venue	Result
FC Match	21–23 March	Linganath Subbu	Vernon Prins	The Central College Ground, Bangalore	Match drawn
