= International cricket in 1961–62 =

International cricket season

The 1961–62 international cricket season was from September 1961 to April 1962.

== Season overview ==
International tours
| Start date | Home team | Away team | Results [Matches] | | | |
| Start date | Home team | Away team | Test | ODI | FC | LA |
|---|---|---|---|---|---|---|
| 12 October 1961 | Australia | New Zealand | — | — | 2–0 [3] | — |
| 21 October 1961 | Pakistan | England | 0–1 [3] | — | — | — |
| 11 November 1961 | India | England | 2–0 [5] | — | — | — |
| 8 December 1961 | South Africa | New Zealand | 2–2 [5] | — | — | — |
| 30 January 1962 | India | Ceylon | — | — | 0–1 [1] | — |
| 16 February 1962 | West Indies | India | 5–0 [5] | — | — | — |
| 16 February 1962 | Ceylon | Marylebone | — | — | 0–1 [1] | — |
| 31 March 1962 | India | International XI | — | — | 0–0 [1] | — |

== October ==
=== New Zealand in Australia ===
3-day Match series
| No. | Date | Home captain | Away captain | Venue | Result |
|---|---|---|---|---|---|
| Match 1 | 12–14 October | (Western Australia) Barry Shepherd | John Reid | WACA Ground, Perth | Match drawn |
| Match 2 | 2–5 March | (South Australia) Les Favell | John Reid | Adelaide Oval, Adelaide | South Australia by 6 wickets |
| Match 3 | 9–12 March | (New South Wales) Richie Benaud | John Reid | Sydney Cricket Ground, Sydney | New South Wales by 59 runs |

=== England in Pakistan ===
Test series
| No. | Date | Home captain | Away captain | Venue | Result |
|---|---|---|---|---|---|
| Test 512 | 21–26 October | Imtiaz Ahmed | Ted Dexter | Gaddafi Stadium, Lahore | England by 5 wickets |
| Test 521 | 19–24 January | Imtiaz Ahmed | Ted Dexter | Bangabandhu National Stadium, Dacca | Match drawn |
| Test 522 | 2–7 February | Imtiaz Ahmed | Ted Dexter | National Stadium, Karachi | Match drawn |

== November ==
=== England in India ===
Test series
| No. | Date | Home captain | Away captain | Venue | Result |
|---|---|---|---|---|---|
| Test 513 | 11–16 November | Nari Contractor | Ted Dexter | Brabourne Stadium, Bombay | Match drawn |
| Test 514 | 1–6 December | Nari Contractor | Ted Dexter | Green Park, Kanpur | Match drawn |
| Test 516 | 13–18 December | Nari Contractor | Ted Dexter | Feroz Shah Kotla Ground, Delhi | Match drawn |
| Test 518 | 30 Dec–4 January | Nari Contractor | Ted Dexter | Eden Gardens, Calcutta | India by 187 runs |
| Test 520 | 10–15 January | Nari Contractor | Ted Dexter | Corporation Stadium, Madras | India by 128 runs |

== December ==
=== New Zealand in South Africa ===
Test series
| No. | Date | Home captain | Away captain | Venue | Result |
|---|---|---|---|---|---|
| Test 515 | 8–12 December | Jackie McGlew | John Reid | Kingsmead, Durban | South Africa by 30 runs |
| Test 517 | 26–29 December | Jackie McGlew | John Reid | New Wanderers Stadium, Johannesburg | Match drawn |
| Test 519 | 1–4 January | Jackie McGlew | John Reid | Newlands, Cape Town | New Zealand by 72 runs |
| Test 523 | 2–5 February | Jackie McGlew | John Reid | New Wanderers Stadium, Johannesburg | South Africa by an innings and 51 runs |
| Test 524 | 16–20 February | Jackie McGlew | John Reid | Crusaders Ground, Port Elizabeth | New Zealand by 40 runs |

== January ==
=== Ceylon in India ===
MJ Gopalan Trophy
| No. | Date | Home captain | Away captain | Venue | Result |
|---|---|---|---|---|---|
| FC Match | 30–31 January | Kripal Singh | Conroy Gunasekera | Kajamalai Stadium, Tiruchi | Ceylon by an innings and 66 runs |

== February ==
=== India in the West Indies ===
Test Series
| No. | Date | Home captain | Away captain | Venue | Result |
|---|---|---|---|---|---|
| Test 525 | 16–20 February | Frank Worrell | Nari Contractor | Queen's Park Oval, Port of Spain | West Indies by 10 wickets |
| Test 526 | 7–12 March | Frank Worrell | Nari Contractor | Sabina Park, Kingston | West Indies by an innings and 18 runs |
| Test 527 | 23–28 March | Frank Worrell | Mansoor Ali Khan Pataudi | Kensington Oval, Bridgetown | West Indies by an innings and 30 runs |
| Test 528 | 4–9 April | Frank Worrell | Mansoor Ali Khan Pataudi | Queen's Park Oval, Port of Spain | West Indies by 7 wickets |
| Test 529 | 13–18 April | Frank Worrell | Mansoor Ali Khan Pataudi | Sabina Park, Kingston | West Indies by 123 runs |

=== MCC in Ceylon ===
First-class Match
| No. | Date | Home captain | Away captain | Venue | Result |
|---|---|---|---|---|---|
| FC Match | 16–18 February | Conroy Gunasekera | Ted Dexter | P Saravanamuttu Stadium, Colombo | Marylebone by 8 wickets |

== March ==
=== International XI in India ===
First-class Match
| No. | Date | Home captain | Away captain | Venue | Result |
|---|---|---|---|---|---|
| Match | 31 Mar–3 April | Gulabrai Ramchand | Richie Benaud | Brabourne Stadium, Bombay | Match drawn |
