= List of West Indies cricket captains =

This is a list of all men, boys and women who have captained the West Indies cricket team at official international level in at least one match. The West Indies became a full member of the Imperial Cricket Conference (now the International Cricket Council) on 31 May 1926 at the same time as India and New Zealand. It played its first test match in 1928 against England at Lord's. Their first game against other opposition came in 1930/31 when they played Australia.

In the mid-1980s there were two rebel West Indian tours to South Africa, which was at that time banned from official competition because of the apartheid régime then in force there. None of the matches from the rebel tours were recognised as official Test matches and all players who toured South Africa at the time were banned from official international cricket matches for life. The captains of those West Indies sides are listed below.

Prior to becoming a member of the ICC, the first combined West Indies team was formed in 1884 and toured Canada and the United States in 1886 under the captaincies of Charles Guy Austin Wyatt of Demerara and Laurence Fyfe of Jamaica (also vice captain under Wyatt). In a return tour by the United States in 1888, the combined West Indian team was captained by Edward Wright. Combined West Indian teams have played more regular first-class cricket under the name "West Indies" since 1897 usually against amateur sides touring from England, such as Lord Brackley's XI or RA Bennett's XI, but from 1912 onwards the MCC also played on tour against the West Indies. The West Indies also toured England in 1900, 1906 and 1923 with the opposition usually being various English first-class and minor county sides. Other opposition during these tours included amateur sides, the MCC, an England XI (once) and Scotland and Ireland (once each). Some of the matches played on the various West Indies tours of England were deemed not to be first-class matches. During this time (1897 to 1926) the various West Indies captains were Aucher Warner, Stanley Sproston (non-first-class matches only), Harold Austin, Clement King, Alfred Harrigan, Edwin Moulder, William Sherlock, Percy Tarilton, Malcolm Austin and Karl Nunes

== Men's cricket ==
=== Test match captains ===
This is a list of cricketers who have captained the West Indian cricket team for at least one Test match. Development of the Test captaincy of West Indies falls into three eras –

- The period of white captaincy
- Rise to become the dominant Test nation
- Slide from Test domination.

The table of results is complete up to the second and final Test match for the West Indies in the 2026-27 West Indian tour of Bangladesh. Where a player has a dagger (†) next to a Test match series in which he captained at least one Test, that denotes that player deputised for the appointed captain or were appointed for a minor proportion in a series.

West Indian Test match captains
Number	Name	Year	Opposition	Location	Played	Won	Lost	Drawn
1	Karl Nunes	1928	England	England	3	0	3	0
1	Karl Nunes	1929/30†	England	West Indies	1	0	0	1
1	Karl Nunes	Total			4	0	3	1
2	Teddy Hoad	1929/30†	England	West Indies	1	0	0	1
3	Nelson Betancourt	1929/30†	England	West Indies	1	0	1	0
4	Maurice Fernandes	1929/30†	England	West Indies	1	1	0	0
5	Jackie Grant^{1}	1930/1	Australia	Australia	5	1	4	0
5	Jackie Grant^{1}	1933	England	England	3	0	2	1
5	Jackie Grant^{1}	1934/5	England	West Indies	4	2	1	1
5	Jackie Grant^{1}	Total			12	3	7	2
6	Rolph Grant^{1}	1939	England	England	3	0	1	2
7	George Headley	1947/8†	England	West Indies	1	0	0	1
8	Gerry Gomez	1947/8†	England	West Indies	1	0	0	1
9	John Goddard	1947/8	England	West Indies	2	2	0	0
9	John Goddard	1948/9	India	India	5	1	0	4
9	John Goddard	1950	England	England	4	3	1	0
9	John Goddard	1951/2	Australia	Australia	4	1	3	0
9	John Goddard	1951/2	New Zealand	New Zealand	2	1	0	1
9	John Goddard	1957	England	England	5	0	3	2
9	John Goddard	Total			22	8	7	7
10	Jeffrey Stollmeyer	1951/2†	Australia	Australia	1	0	1	0
10	Jeffrey Stollmeyer	1952/3	India	West Indies	5	1	0	4
10	Jeffrey Stollmeyer	1953/4	England	West Indies	5	2	2	1
10	Jeffrey Stollmeyer	1954/5†	Australia	West Indies	2	0	1	1
10	Jeffrey Stollmeyer	Total			13	3	4	6
11	Denis Atkinson	1954/5	Australia	West Indies	3	0	2	1
11	Denis Atkinson	1955/6	New Zealand	New Zealand	4	3	1	0
11	Denis Atkinson	Total			7	3	3	1
12	Gerry Alexander	1957/8	Pakistan	West Indies	5	3	1	1
12	Gerry Alexander	1958/9	India	India	5	3	0	2
12	Gerry Alexander	1958/9	Pakistan	Pakistan	3	1	2	0
12	Gerry Alexander	1959/60	England	West Indies	5	0	1	4
12	Gerry Alexander	Total			18	7	4	7
13	Frank Worrell	1960/1	Australia	Australia	5	1	2	2^{2}
13	Frank Worrell	1961/2	India	West Indies	5	5	0	0
13	Frank Worrell	1963	England	England	5	3	1	1
13	Frank Worrell	Total			15	9	3	3^{2}
14	Garfield Sobers^{3}	1964/5	Australia	West Indies	5	2	1	2
14	Garfield Sobers^{3}	1966	England	England	5	3	1	1
14	Garfield Sobers^{3}	1966/7	India	India	3	2	0	1
14	Garfield Sobers^{3}	1967/8	England	West Indies	5	0	1	4
14	Garfield Sobers^{3}	1968/9	Australia	Australia	5	1	3	1
14	Garfield Sobers^{3}	1968/9	New Zealand	New Zealand	3	1	1	1
14	Garfield Sobers^{3}	1969	England	England	3	0	2	1
14	Garfield Sobers^{3}	1970/1	India	West Indies	5	0	1	4
14	Garfield Sobers^{3}	1971/2	New Zealand	West Indies	5	0	0	5
14	Garfield Sobers^{3}	Total			39	9	10	20
15	Rohan Kanhai	1972/3	Australia	West Indies	5	0	2	3
15	Rohan Kanhai	1973	England	England	3	2	0	1
15	Rohan Kanhai	1973/4	England	West Indies	5	1	1	3
15	Rohan Kanhai	Total			13	3	3	7
16	Clive Lloyd	1974/5	India	India	5	3	2	0
16	Clive Lloyd	1974/5	Pakistan	Pakistan	2	0	0	2
16	Clive Lloyd	1975/6	Australia	Australia	6	1	5	0
16	Clive Lloyd	1975/6	India	West Indies	4	2	1	1
16	Clive Lloyd	1976	England	England	5	3	0	2
16	Clive Lloyd	1976/7	Pakistan	West Indies	5	2	1	2
16	Clive Lloyd	1977/8†	Australia	West Indies	2	2	0	0
16	Clive Lloyd	1979/80	Australia	Australia	2	2	0	0
16	Clive Lloyd	1979/80	New Zealand	New Zealand	3	0	1	2
16	Clive Lloyd	1980	England	England	4	1	0	3
16	Clive Lloyd	1980/1	Pakistan	Pakistan	4	1	0	3
16	Clive Lloyd	1980/1	England	West Indies	4	2	0	2
16	Clive Lloyd	1981/2	Australia	Australia	3	1	1	1
16	Clive Lloyd	1982/3	India	West Indies	5	2	0	3
16	Clive Lloyd	1983/4	India	India	6	3	0	3
16	Clive Lloyd	1983/4	Australia	West Indies	4	3	0	1
16	Clive Lloyd	1984	England	England	5	5	0	0
16	Clive Lloyd	1984/5	Australia	Australia	5	3	1	1
16	Clive Lloyd	Total			74	36	12	26
17	Alvin Kallicharran	1977/8	Australia	West Indies	3	1	1	1
17	Alvin Kallicharran	1978/9	India	India	6	0	1	5
17	Alvin Kallicharran	Total			9	1	2	6
18	Deryck Murray	1979/80†	Australia	Australia	1	0	0	1
19	Viv Richards	1980†	England	England	1	0	0	1
19	Viv Richards	1983/4	Australia	West Indies	1	0	0	1
19	Viv Richards	1984/5	New Zealand	West Indies	4	2	0	2
19	Viv Richards	1985/6	England	West Indies	5	5	0	0
19	Viv Richards	1986/7	Pakistan	Pakistan	3	1	1	1
19	Viv Richards	1986/7	New Zealand	New Zealand	3	1	1	1
19	Viv Richards	1987/8	India	India	4	1	1	2
19	Viv Richards	1987/8	Pakistan	West Indies	2	1	0	1
19	Viv Richards	1988	England	England	5	4	0	1
19	Viv Richards	1988/9	Australia	Australia	5	3	1	1
19	Viv Richards	1988/9	India	West Indies	4	3	0	1
19	Viv Richards	1989/90	England	West Indies	3	2	1	0
19	Viv Richards	1990/1	Australia	West Indies	5	2	1	2
19	Viv Richards	1991	England	England	5	2	2	1
19	Viv Richards	Total			50	27	8	15
20	Gordon Greenidge	1987/8†	Pakistan	West Indies	1	0	1	0
21	Desmond Haynes	1989/90†	England	West Indies	1	0	0	1
21	Desmond Haynes	1990/1	Pakistan	Pakistan	3	1	1	1
21	Desmond Haynes	Total			4	1	1	2
22	Richie Richardson	1991/2	South Africa	West Indies	1	1	0	0
22	Richie Richardson	1992/3	Australia	Australia	5	2	1	2
22	Richie Richardson	1992/3	Pakistan	West Indies	3	2	0	1
22	Richie Richardson	1993/4	Sri Lanka	Sri Lanka	1	0	0	1
22	Richie Richardson	1993/4	England	West Indies	4	3	1	0
22	Richie Richardson	1994/5	Australia	West Indies	4	1	2	1
22	Richie Richardson	1995	England	England	6	2	2	2
22	Richie Richardson	Total			24	11	6	7
23	Courtney Walsh	1993/4†	England	West Indies	1	0	0	1
23	Courtney Walsh	1994/5	India	India	3	1	1	1
23	Courtney Walsh	1994/5	New Zealand	New Zealand	2	1	0	1
23	Courtney Walsh	1995/6	New Zealand	West Indies	2	1	0	1
23	Courtney Walsh	1996/7	Australia	Australia	5	2	3	0
23	Courtney Walsh	1996/7	India	West Indies	4	0	0	4
23	Courtney Walsh	1996/7	Sri Lanka	West Indies	2	1	0	1
23	Courtney Walsh	1997/8	Pakistan	Pakistan	3	0	3	0
23	Courtney Walsh	Total			22	6	7	9
24	Brian Lara	1996/7†	India	West Indies	1	1	0	0
24	Brian Lara	1997/8	England	West Indies	6	3	1	2
24	Brian Lara	1998/9	South Africa	South Africa	5	0	5	0
24	Brian Lara	1998/9	Australia	West Indies	4	2	2	0
24	Brian Lara	1999/2000	New Zealand	New Zealand	2	0	2	0
24	Brian Lara	2002/3	Australia	West Indies	4	1	3	0
24	Brian Lara	2003	Sri Lanka	West Indies	2	1	0	1
24	Brian Lara	2003/4	Zimbabwe	Zimbabwe	2	1	0	1
24	Brian Lara	2003/4	South Africa	South Africa	4	0	3	1
24	Brian Lara	2003/4	England	West Indies	4	0	3	1
24	Brian Lara	2004	Bangladesh	West Indies	2	1	0	1
24	Brian Lara	2004	England	England	4	0	4	0
24	Brian Lara	2006	India	West Indies	4	0	1	3
24	Brian Lara	2006/7	Pakistan	Pakistan	3	0	2	1
24	Brian Lara	Total			47	10	26	11
25	Jimmy Adams	1999/2000	Zimbabwe	West Indies	2	2	0	0
25	Jimmy Adams	1999/2000	Pakistan	West Indies	3	1	0	2
25	Jimmy Adams	2000	England	England	5	1	3	1
25	Jimmy Adams	2000/1	Australia	Australia	5	0	5	0
25	Jimmy Adams	Total			15	4	8	3
26	Carl Hooper	2000/1	South Africa	West Indies	5	1	2	2
26	Carl Hooper	2001	Zimbabwe	Zimbabwe	2	1	0	1
26	Carl Hooper	2001/2	Sri Lanka	Sri Lanka	3	0	3	0
26	Carl Hooper	2001/2	Pakistan	Sharjah	2	0	2	0
26	Carl Hooper	2001/2	India	West Indies	5	2	1	2
26	Carl Hooper	2002	New Zealand	West Indies	2	0	1	1
26	Carl Hooper	2002/3	India	India	3	0	2	1
26	Carl Hooper	Total			22	4	11	7
27	Ridley Jacobs	2002/3	Bangladesh	Bangladesh	2	2	0	0
28	Shivnarine Chanderpaul	2004/5	South Africa	West Indies	4	0	2	2
28	Shivnarine Chanderpaul	2004/5	Pakistan	West Indies	2	1	1	0
28	Shivnarine Chanderpaul	2005	Sri Lanka	Sri Lanka	2	0	2	0
28	Shivnarine Chanderpaul	2005/6	Australia	Australia	3	0	3	0
28	Shivnarine Chanderpaul	2005/6	New Zealand	New Zealand	3	0	2	1
28	Shivnarine Chanderpaul	Total			14	1	10	3
29	Ramnaresh Sarwan	2007	England	England	2	0	1	1
29	Ramnaresh Sarwan	2008	Australia	West Indies	2	0	1	1
29	Ramnaresh Sarwan	Total			4	0	2	2
30	Daren Ganga	2007†	England	England	2	0	2	0
31	Chris Gayle	2007/8	South Africa	South Africa	2	1	1	0
31	Chris Gayle	2007/8	Sri Lanka	West Indies	2	1	1	0
31	Chris Gayle	2008†	Australia	West Indies	1	0	1	0
31	Chris Gayle	2008/09	New Zealand	New Zealand	2	0	0	2
31	Chris Gayle	2008/09	England	West Indies	5	1	0	4
31	Chris Gayle	2009	England	England	2	0	2	0
31	Chris Gayle	2009/10	Australia	Australia	3	0	2	1
31	Chris Gayle	2010	South Africa	West Indies	3	0	2	1
31	Chris Gayle	Total			20	3	9	8
32	Dwayne Bravo	2007/8†	South Africa	South Africa	1	0	1	0
33	Floyd Reifer	2009	Bangladesh	West Indies	2	0	2	0
34	Darren Sammy	2010/11	Sri Lanka	Sri Lanka	3	0	0	3
34	Darren Sammy	2011	Pakistan	West Indies	2	1	1	0
34	Darren Sammy	2011	India	West Indies	3	0	1	2
34	Darren Sammy	2011	Bangladesh	Bangladesh	2	1	0	1
34	Darren Sammy	2011	India	India	3	0	2	1
34	Darren Sammy	2011/12	Australia	West Indies	3	0	2	1
34	Darren Sammy	2012	England	England	3	0	2	1
34	Darren Sammy	2012	New Zealand	West Indies	2	2	0	0
34	Darren Sammy	2012/13	Bangladesh	Bangladesh	2	2	0	0
34	Darren Sammy	2012/13	Zimbabwe	West Indies	2	2	0	0
34	Darren Sammy	2013/14	India	India	2	0	2	0
34	Darren Sammy	2013/14	New Zealand	New Zealand	3	0	2	1
34	Darren Sammy	Total			30	8	12	10
35	Denesh Ramdin	2014	New Zealand	West Indies	3	1	2	0
35	Denesh Ramdin	2014	Bangladesh	West Indies	2	2	0	0
35	Denesh Ramdin	2014/15	South Africa	South Africa	3	0	2	1
35	Denesh Ramdin	2014/15	England	West Indies	3	1	1	1
35	Denesh Ramdin	2015	Australia	West Indies	2	0	2	0
35	Denesh Ramdin	Total			13	4	7	2
36	Jason Holder	2015/16	Sri Lanka	Sri Lanka	2	0	2	0
36	Jason Holder	2015/16	Australia	Australia	3	0	2	1
36	Jason Holder	2016	India	West Indies	4	0	2	2
36	Jason Holder	2016	Pakistan	UAE	3	1	2	0
36	Jason Holder	2016/17	Pakistan	West Indies	3	1	2	0
36	Jason Holder	2017	England	England	3	1	2	0
36	Jason Holder	2017	Zimbabwe	Zimbabwe	2	1	0	1
36	Jason Holder	2017/18	New Zealand	New Zealand	1	0	1	0
36	Jason Holder	2018	Sri Lanka	West Indies	3	1	1	1
36	Jason Holder	2018	Bangladesh	West Indies	2	2	0	0
36	Jason Holder	2018/19	India	India	1	0	1	0
36	Jason Holder	2018/19	England	West Indies	2	2	0	0
36	Jason Holder	2019	India	West Indies	2	0	2	0
36	Jason Holder	2019/20	Afghanistan	India	1	1	0	0
36	Jason Holder	2020	England	England	3	1	2	0
36	Jason Holder	2020/21	New Zealand	New Zealand	2	0	2	0
36	Jason Holder	Total			37	11	21	5
37	Kraigg Brathwaite	2017/18†	New Zealand	New Zealand	1	0	1	0
37	Kraigg Brathwaite	2018/19†	India	India	1	0	1	0
37	Kraigg Brathwaite	2018/19	Bangladesh	Bangladesh	2	0	2	0
37	Kraigg Brathwaite	2018/19†	England	West Indies	1	0	1	0
37	Kraigg Brathwaite	2020/21	Bangladesh	Bangladesh	2	2	0	0
37	Kraigg Brathwaite	2020/21	Sri Lanka	West Indies	2	0	0	2
37	Kraigg Brathwaite	2021	South Africa	West Indies	2	0	2	0
37	Kraigg Brathwaite	2021	Pakistan	West Indies	2	1	1	0
37	Kraigg Brathwaite	2021/22	Sri Lanka	Sri Lanka	2	0	2	0
37	Kraigg Brathwaite	2021/22	England	West Indies	3	1	0	2
37	Kraigg Brathwaite	2022	Bangladesh	West Indies	2	2	0	0
37	Kraigg Brathwaite	2022/23	Australia	Australia	2	0	2	0
37	Kraigg Brathwaite	2022/23	Zimbabwe	Zimbabwe	2	1	0	1
37	Kraigg Brathwaite	2022/23	South Africa	South Africa	2	0	2	0
37	Kraigg Brathwaite	2023	India	West Indies	2	0	1	1
37	Kraigg Brathwaite	2023/24	Australia	Australia	2	1	1	0
37	Kraigg Brathwaite	2024	England	England	3	0	3	0
37	Kraigg Brathwaite	2024	South Africa	West Indies	2	0	1	1
37	Kraigg Brathwaite	2024/25	Bangladesh	West Indies	2	1	1	0
37	Kraigg Brathwaite	2024/25	Pakistan	Pakistan	2	1	1	0
37	Kraigg Brathwaite	Total			39	10	22	7
38	Roston Chase	2025	Australia	West Indies	3	0	3	0
38	Roston Chase	2025/26	India	India	2	0	2	0
38	Roston Chase	2025/26	New Zealand	New Zealand	3	0	2	1
38	Roston Chase	2026	Sri Lanka	West Indies	2	1	0	1
38	Roston Chase	2026	Pakistan	West Indies	2	1	1	0
38	Roston Chase	2026/27	Bangladesh	Bangladesh	2	1	0	1
38	Roston Chase	Total			14	3	8	3
Grand total					598	188	224	186^{2}

Notes:

- ^{1} Jackie and Rolph Grant were brothers
- ^{2} Includes one tie
- ^{3} Garfield Sobers also captained the Rest of the World team in England in 1970 and in Australia in 1971/2. These series were arranged to replace planned tours of those countries by South Africa, which were cancelled because of the apartheid policies followed by the South African government of the time.

=== Men's ODI captains ===
This is a complete list of every man who has captained the West Indies in at least one One Day International. It is complete up to third and final match for the West Indies in the 2026-27 West Indian tour of India.

West Indian ODI captains
Number	Name	Period of captaincy	Played	Won	Tied	Lost	No result
1	Rohan Kanhai	1973	2	1	0	1	0
2	Clive Lloyd	1975–1985	84	64	1	18	1
3	Deryck Murray	1978–1979	2	2	0	0	0
4	Alvin Kallicharan	1978	1	0	0	1	0
5	Viv Richards	1980–1991	105	67	0	36	2
6	Michael Holding	1984	2	2	0	0	0
7	Gordon Greenidge	1988	8	6	0	2	0
8	Desmond Haynes	1989–1993	7	3	0	4	0
9	Jeff Dujon	1990	1	1	0	0	0
10	Richie Richardson	1991–1996	87	46	3	36	2
11	Courtney Walsh	1994–1997	43	22	0	20	1
12	Brian Lara	1994–2007	125	59	0	59	7
13	Carl Hooper	1997–2003	49	23	0	24	2
14	Jimmy Adams	1999–2001	26	10	1	14	1
15	Sherwin Campbell	2001	1	0	0	1	0
16	Ridley Jacobs	2002	4	2	0	1	1
17	Ramnaresh Sarwan	2004–2008	5	4	0	1	0
18	Shivnarine Chanderpaul	2005–2006	16	2	0	14	0
19	Sylvester Joseph	2005	1	0	0	1	0
20	Chris Gayle	2007–2010	53	17	0	30	6
21	Dwayne Bravo	2007–2014	37	17	2	18	0
22	Floyd Reifer	2009	6	0	0	6	0
23	Darren Sammy	2010–2013	51	19	1	30	1
24	Denesh Ramdin	2011	1	1	0	0	0
25	Kieron Pollard	2013–2022	24	13	0	11	0
26	Jason Holder	2015–2019	86	24	2	54	6
27	Marlon Samuels	2015	1	0	0	1	0
28	Jason Mohammed	2017-2021	4	0	0	4	0
29	Rovman Powell	2018	3	1	0	2	0
30	Nicholas Pooran	2022–2023	17	4	0	13	0
31	Shai Hope	2023–present	57	23	2	30	2
32	Roston Chase	2023	1	1	0	0	0
Grand total			910	434	12	432	32

=== Men's Twenty20 International captains ===
This is a complete list of every man who has captained the West Indies in at least one Twenty20 international. It is complete up to the fifth and final T20I match for the West Indies in the 2026-27 West Indian tour of India.

The first Twenty20 International involving West Indies was played in February 2006 against New Zealand in Auckland. This match was the first tied Twenty20 International and also involved the first bowl-out (won by New Zealand).

Two years later in December 2008, another match between New Zealand and West Indies at the same venue in Auckland was also tied and this match involved the first elimination over/Super Over (won by West Indies) which is meant to replace the bowl-out.

The first Twenty20 International played in the West Indies was played on 20 June 2008 against Australia in Bridgetown, Barbados.

West Indian Twenty20 International captains
No.	Name	Span	Played	Won	Tied	Lost	NR
1	Shivnarine Chanderpaul	2006	1	0	1	0	0
2	Chris Gayle	2007–2010	17	6	1	10	0
3	Ramnaresh Sarwan	2007	2	0	0	2	0
4	Dwayne Bravo	2007–2014	6	3	0	3	0
5	Denesh Ramdin	2009–2010	3	1	0	2	0
6	Floyd Reifer	2009	1	1	0	0	0
7	Darren Sammy	2011–2016	47	27	1	17	2
8	Carlos Brathwaite	2016–2019	30	11	0	17	2
9	Jason Mohammed	2018	3	0	0	3	0
10	Jason Holder	2019	3	0	0	3	0
11	Kieron Pollard	2019–2022	39	13	0	21	5
12	Nicholas Pooran	2021–2022	23	8	0	14	1
13	Rovman Powell	2022–2025	37	19	0	17	1
14	Brandon King	2024-2026	6	4	0	2	0
15	Roston Chase	2024-2026	3	2	0	1	0
16	Shai Hope	2025-present	36	15	0	19	2
17	Akeal Hosein	2025	3	1	0	2	0
Grand total			259	111	3	134	13

=== Captains in Men's ICC tournaments ===
WI Captains in ICC Tournaments
Tournament	Name	Captain's Country	Format	Played	Won	Lost	Tied/NR	Stand	Winning rate
1975 Cricket World Cup	Clive Lloyd	Guyana	60 overs	5	5	0	0	Champions	100%
1979 Cricket World Cup	Clive Lloyd	Guyana	60 overs	5	4	0	1	Champions	80%
1983 Cricket World Cup	Clive Lloyd	Guyana	60 overs	8	6	2	0	Runners-up	75%
1987 Cricket World Cup	Viv Richards	Antigua and Barbuda	50 overs	6	3	3	0	Group stage	50%
1992 Cricket World Cup	Richie Richardson	Antigua and Barbuda	50 overs	6	3	3	0	Group stage	50%
1996 Cricket World Cup	Richie Richardson	Antigua and Barbuda	50 overs	7	3	4	0	Semi Finals	42.3%
1998 ICC KnockOut Trophy	Brian Lara	Trinidad and Tobago	50 overs	3	2	1	0	Runners-up	75%
1999 Cricket World Cup	Brian Lara	Trinidad and Tobago	50 overs	5	3	2	0	Group Stage	60%
2000 ICC KnockOut Trophy	Sherwin Campbell	Barbados	50 overs	1	0	1	0	Group Stage	0
2002 ICC Champions Trophy	Carl Hooper	Guyana	50 overs	2	1	1	0	Group Stage	50%
2003 Cricket World Cup	Carl Hooper	Guyana	50 overs	6	3	2	1	Super Six	50%
2004 ICC Champions Trophy	Brian Lara	Trinidad and Tobago	50 overs	4	4	0	0	Champions	100%
2006 ICC Champions Trophy	Brian Lara	Trinidad and Tobago	50 overs	8	5	3	0	Runners-up	62.5%
2007 Cricket World Cup	Brian Lara	Trinidad and Tobago	50 overs	10	5	5	0	Super 8	50%
2007 World Twenty20	Ramnaresh Sarwan	Guyana	20 overs	2	0	2	0	Group Stage	0%
2009 World Twenty20	Chris Gayle	Jamaica	20 overs	6	4	3	0	Semi Finals	50%
2009 ICC Champions Trophy	Floyd Reifer	Barbados	50 overs	3	0	3	0	Group Stage	0%
2010 World Twenty20	Chris Gayle	Jamaica	20 overs	5	3	2	0	Super 8	60%
2011 Cricket World Cup	Darren Sammy	Saint Lucia	50 overs	7	3	4	0	Quarter-Finals	43%
2012 World Twenty20	Darren Sammy	Saint Lucia	20 overs	7	3	2	2	Champions	43%
2013 ICC Champions Trophy	Dwayne Bravo	Trinidad and Tobago	50 overs	3	1	1	1	Group Stage	20%
2014 World Twenty20	Darren Sammy	Saint Lucia	20 overs	5	3	2	0	Semi Finals	60%
2015 Cricket World Cup	Jason Holder	Barbados	50 overs	7	3	4	0	Quarter-Finals	43%
2016 World Twenty20	Darren Sammy	Saint Lucia	20 overs	6	5	1	0	Champions	83.33%
2019 Cricket World Cup	Jason Holder	Barbados	50 overs	9	2	6	1	Group Stage	22.22%
2021 World Twenty20	Kieron Pollard	Trinidad and Tobago	20 overs	5	1	4	0	Group Stage	20%
2022 Men's T20 World Cup	Nicholas Pooran	Trinidad and Tobago	20 overs	3	1	2	0	Group Stage	33.33%
2024 Men's T20 World Cup	Rovman Powell	Jamaica	20 overs	7	5	2	0	Super 8	71%
2026 Men's T20 World Cup	Shai Hope	Barbados	20 overs	7	5	2	0	Super 8	71%

=== Other men's captains ===
In addition to the above official Tests and ODIs, there have been West Indian captains of other leading sides. The Rest of the World teams that played in England and Australia in 1970 and 1971/2 respectively were captained by a West Indian. World Series Cricket featured a West Indian side, and finally, there were two rebel West Indian tours to apartheid South Africa.

==== Rest of the World, 1970 and 1971/2 ====
When the South African tour to England due to take place in 1970 was cancelled, five matches were arranged against a Rest of the World team, all of which were recognised as Tests at the time, although they were later stripped of Test status. A similar situation also arose with the proposed South African tour of Australia that was due to take place in 1971/2, when the Rest of the World team also played two one-day matches. (There were to be three games, but one was abandoned without a ball being bowled.) These matches do not have official ODI status. The Rest of the World team was captained by a West Indian, Garfield Sobers.

Rest of the World Test match captains
Number	Name	Year	Opposition	Location	Played	Won	Lost	Drawn
1	Garfield Sobers	1970	England	England	5	4	1	0
1	Garfield Sobers	1971/2	Australia	Australia	5	2	1	2
1	Garfield Sobers	Total			10	6	2	2

Rest of the World ODI captains
Number	Name	Period of captaincy	Played	Won	Tied	Lost	No result
1	Garfield Sobers	1971/2	2	1	0	1	0

==== World Series Cricket, 1977/8 to 1978/9 ====
In 1977/8 Kerry Packer financed a breakaway cricket movement by signing up top players from Australia, the West Indies and other cricket nations around the world. Three sides were constructed: an Australian team, a West Indian team and a World team, with the World teams including some West Indians too. The teams played a mixture of unofficial Test matches, styled as Supertests, and unofficial ODIs. Unlike the Australian players, who were barred from playing official cricket until the rift was healed after the 1978/9 season, the West Indian players were permitted to play official cricket as well as compete in World Series Cricket.

West Indian Supertest match captains
Number	Name	Year	Opposition	Location	Played	Won	Lost	Drawn
1	Clive Lloyd	1977/8	Australia	Australia	3	2	1	0
1	Clive Lloyd	1978/9	World XI	Australia	1	0	1	0
1	Clive Lloyd	1978/9	Australia	Australia	2	0	1	1
1	Clive Lloyd	1978/9	Australia	West Indies	5	1	1	3
1	Clive Lloyd	Total			11	3	4	4

West Indian WSC ODI captains
Number	Name	Period of captaincy	Played	Won	Tied	Lost	No result
1	Clive Lloyd	1977/8-1978/9	39	24	0	11	4

==== Rebel tour to South Africa, 1982/3 and 1983/4 ====
In 1982/3 and 1983/4 a group of West Indian cricketers toured apartheid South Africa. The West Indies Cricket Board banned all the tourists from cricket for life, and such was the furore caused by the visits that many of the cricketers ceased to be welcome in their home islands. The rebel West Indian squad played a series of Tests and ODIs, none of which have official status.

West Indian rebel Test match captains
Number	Name	Year	Opposition	Location	Played	Won	Lost	Drawn
1	Lawrence Rowe	1982/3	South Africa	South Africa	2	1	1	0
1	Lawrence Rowe	1983/4	South Africa	South Africa	3	1	1	1
1	Lawrence Rowe	Total			5	2	2	1
2	Alvin Kallicharan	1983/1984†	South Africa	South Africa	1	1	0	0
Grand total					6	3	2	1

West Indian rebel ODI captains
Number	Name	Period of captaincy	Played	Won	Tied	Lost	No result
1	Lawrence Rowe	1982/3-1983/4	11	7	0	4	0
2	Alvin Kallicharan	1983/4	1	1	0	0	0
Grand total			12	8	0	4	0

== Women's cricket ==
=== Test match captains ===
This is a list of cricketers who have captained the West Indian women's cricket team for at least one women's Test match. The table of results is complete to the Test against Pakistan in 2003/4.

West Indian women's Test match captains
Number	Name	Year	Opposition	Location	Played	Won	Lost	Drawn
1	Louise Browne	1975/6	Australia	West Indies	2	0	0	2
1	Louise Browne	1976/7	India	India	6	1	1	4
1	Louise Browne	Total			8	1	1	6
2	Patricia Whittaker	1979	England	England	3	0	2	1
3	Stephanie Power	2003/4	Pakistan	Pakistan	1	0	0	1
Grand total					12	1	3	8

=== Women's One-Day International captains ===
This is a list of cricketers who have captained the West Indian women's cricket team for at least one women's one-day international. The table of results is complete to the third and final match for the team in the 2026-27 West Indian women's tour of Zimbabwe.

West Indian women's ODI captains
Number	Name	Year	Played	Won	Tied	Lost	No result
1	Grace Williams	1979	1	0	0	1	0
2	Patricia Whittaker	1979	1	1	0	0	0
3	Rita Scott	1993	1	0	0	1	0
4	Ann Browne	1993-1998	9	3	0	6	0
5	Marlene Needham	1997	1	0	0	1	0
6	Verena Felician	2003	6	0	0	6	0
7	Stephanie Power	2003–2005	25	13	0	11	1
8	Envis Williams	2004	1	0	0	1	0
9	Nadine George	2008	10	5	0	4	1
10	Chedean Nation	2008	3	3	0	0	0
11	Merissa Aguilleira	2009–2015	74	39	1	32	2
12	Anisa Mohammed	2010-2022	7	1	0	6	0
13	Stafanie Taylor	2013–2022	61	24	1^{2}	33	3
14	Shakera Selman	2016	1	0	0	1	0
15	Deandra Dottin	2021	1	0	1^{1}	0	0
16	Hayley Matthews	2022-present	42	18	0	22	2
17	Shemaine Campbelle	2023-2025	5	0	0	5	0
Grand total			249	107	3	130	9

Notes

- ^{1} West Indies women won the One Over Eliminator against South Africa women in the fifth WODI of the 2021 South Africa women's tour of the West Indies
- ^{2} West Indies women won the One Over Eliminator against South Africa women in the second WODI of the 2021-22 West Indies women's tour of South Africa

=== Women's Twenty20 International captains ===
This is a complete list of every woman who has captained the West Indies in at least one twenty20 international. It is complete up to the third and final match for the team in the 2026-27 West Indian women's tour of Zimbabwe. In 2010 West Indies women took their first international T20 title by winning the 2010 ICC Women's Cricket Challenge. The first Twenty20 International involving West Indies women was played in June 2008 against Ireland in Dublin.

West Indian Twenty20 International captains
Number	Name	Period of captaincy	Played	Won	Tied	Lost	No result
1	Nadine George	2008	3	3	0	0	0
2	Merissa Aguilleira^{1,2}	2009–2015, 2019	73	39	3^{3,5,7}	29	2
3	Anisa Mohammed	2010–2021	9	2	0	6	1
4	Stafanie Taylor	2012–2022	56	29	2^{4,6}	25	1
5	Shemaine Campbelle	2012	1	1	0	0	0
6	Hayley Matthews	2022-2026	63	26	1	35	1
7	Karishma Ramharack	2025	1	1	0	0	0
8	Chinelle Henry	2026-present	4	3	0	0	1
Grand total			212	105	6	95	6

Notes:

- ^{1} Also captained two warm-up matches against Pakistan and Sri Lanka which were both won by West Indies.
- ^{2} After the 2010 Sri Lanka women's tour to the West Indies, Pakistan played an apparently unofficial 3-match series in preparation for the Women's World Twenty20. Aguilleira captained WI women entirely in this series which WI women won 2–1. This was followed by two official warm-up matches (in which Aguilleira also captained WI women), one against Pakistan women again (won by Pakistan) and one against New Zealand women (won by West Indies women).
- ^{3} West Indies won the Super Over in this match by 3 runs with WI scoring 10/1 and Pakistan scoring 7/1
- ^{4} West Indies won the One Over Eliminator in this match with England scoring 6/1 and West Indies replying with 9/0
- ^{5} New Zealand won the One Over Eliminator in this match with West Indies scoring 5/2 and New Zealand replying with 8/0
- ^{6} West Indies won the One Over Eliminator in this match with Pakistan scoring 3/2 and West Indies replying with 6/1
- ^{7} West Indies won the One Over Eliminator in this match with West Indies scoring 18/0 and Pakistan replying with 1/2

== Youth cricket ==
=== Youth Test match captains ===
This is a list of cricketers who have captained the West Indian U-19 cricket team for at least one under-19 Test match. The table of results is complete to the second and final youth Test match of the 2023 tour of Sri Lanka by the West Indies U-19 team and includes the only youth Test match of the 2011 Dubai Series between the West Indies U-19 team and the Australia U-19 team and the third Test against England in 2001.

West Indian Under-19 Test match captains
Number	Name	Year	Opposition	Location	Played	Won	Lost	Drawn
1	Colin Murray	1974	England	England	3	1	0	2
2	Timur Mohamed	1976	England	West Indies	1	0	1	0
3	Austin White	1978	England	England	3	0	1	2
4	Marlon Tucker	1979/80	England	West Indies	3	2	0	1
5	Roger Harper	1982	England	England	3	2	0	1
6	Zorol Barthley	1984/5	England	West Indies	3	2	0	1
7	Brian Lara	1987/8	Australia	Australia	1	1	0	0
8	Sherwin Campbell	1990	Australia	West Indies	3	0	2	1
9	Ian Bradshaw	1993	England	England	3	0	1	2
10	Andre Percival	1994/5	England	England	3	1	0	2
11	Gareth Breese	1995/6	Pakistan	Pakistan	3	2	0	1
12	Shirley Clarke	1996/7	Pakistan	West Indies	3	0	0	3
13	Brenton Parchment	2001	England	England	3	1	0	2
14	Kraigg Brathwaite	2011	Australia	UAE	1	1	0	0
15	Nathan Sealy	2023	Sri Lanka	Sri Lanka	2	0	1	1
Grand total					38	13	6	19

=== Youth One-Day International captains ===
This is a list of cricketers who have captained the West Indian U-19 cricket team for at least one U-19 One Day International. The table of results is complete to the fifth and final youth ODI match for the West Indies U-19 team of the 2026 Under-19 Men's Cricket World Cup. West Indies U-19s' best result in an U-19 World Cup has been as champions in 2016. Previously they were a finalist in 2003/04 and 2007/08 they won the plate final for the U-19 World Cup.

West Indian Under-19 ODI captains
Number	Name	Year	Played	Won	Tied	Lost	No result
1	Timur Mohamed	1976	1	0	0	1	0
2	Austin White	1978	1	0	0	1	0
3	Roger Harper	1982	2	0	0	2	0
4	Zorol Barthley	1985	2	1	0	1	0
5	Brian Lara	1988	8	5	0	3	0
6	Ian Bradshaw	1993	2	0	0	2	0
7	Rawl Lewis	1995	2	1	0	1	0
8	Andre Percival	1995	1	0	0	1	0
9	Gareth Breese	1995	3	1	0	2	0
10	Shirley Clarke	1996	3	2	0	1	0
11	Sylvester Joseph	1998	7	4	0	3	0
12	Ryan Hinds	2000	5	3	0	2	0
13	Marlon Samuels	2000	1	1	0	0	0
14	Brenton Parchment	2001	3	2	0	1	0
15	Narsingh Deonarine	2002	7	4	0	3	0
16	Denesh Ramdin	2004	12	7	0	5	0
17	Leon Johnson	2006	8	3	0	5	0
18	Jason Mohammed	2006	1	0	0	1	0
19	Shamarh Brooks	2008	8	4	0	4	0
20	Steven Jacobs	2008	1	1	0	0	0
21	Andre Creary	2010	4	2	0	2	0
22	Yannick Ottley	2010	2	2	0	0	0
23	Kraigg Brathwaite	2011/12	16	8	0	8	0
24	Ramaal Lewis	2013/14	13	6	0	7	0
25	Jeremy Solozano	2013	1	0	0	1	0
26	Shimron Hetmyer	2015/16	9	5	0	4	0
27	Emmanuel Stewart	2017	14	8	0	6	0
28	Kimani Melius	2019–2020	12	6	0	5	1
29	Ackeem Auguste	2021-2022	5	1	0	4	0
30	Giovonte Depeiza	2021-2022	4	2	0	2	0
31	Matthew Nandu	2022–2023	3	2	0	1	0
32	Stephan Pascal	2023–2024	8	4	0	3	1
33	Joshua Dorne	2025-present	19	12	0	7	0
Grand total			188	97	0	89	2

=== Youth Women's Twenty20 International captains ===
This is a list of cricketers who have captained the West Indies women's under-19 cricket team for at least one U-19 Twenty20 International. The table of results is complete to the fifth and final youth ODI match for the WI women's U-19 in the 2023 ICC Under-19 Women's T20 World Cup where the team advanced to the Super 6 stage before being eliminated.

West Indian Women's Under-19 T20 captains
Number	Name	Year	Played	Won	Tied	Lost	No result
1	Ashmini Munisar	2023	5	2	0	3	0
Grand total			5	2	0	3	0

== Most successful captains ==
The West Indian team's greatest successes in One Day Internationals came in 1975 and 1979, when they won the Cricket World Cup under the captaincy of Clive Lloyd, and in 2004 when they won the ICC Champions Trophy under the captaincy of Brian Lara. The West Indies' most successful captains in Test cricket are Viv Richards (who has won 27 of his 50 Tests), Clive Lloyd (who won 36 of his 74 Tests), Frank Worrell (who won 9 of his 15 Tests) and Richie Richardson (who won 11 of his 24 Tests). In one-day internationals the West Indies' most successful captain is Clive Lloyd, who won 64 of his 84 matches. The successes of the senior men's team in international tournaments was never replicated at the youth level until the 2016 U-19 Cricket World Cup when Shimron Hetmyer lead the West Indies Under-19 team to their first ICC Under-19 Cricket World Cup title. For the most recent international format of cricket, Twenty20 Internationals, the West Indies' best result in an international tournament was achieved in the 2012 ICC World Twenty20 and 2016 ICC World Twenty20 where the team won the ICC World Twenty20 under the captaincy of Darren Sammy. Stafanie Taylor led the West Indies' women's team to their best result in an international Twenty20 tournament when the team won the 2016 ICC Women's World Twenty20. Prior to that Merissa Aguilleira led West Indies women to the semi-finals in the 2010 ICC Women's World Twenty20, the 2012 ICC Women's World Twenty20 and the 2014 ICC Women's World Twenty20 and also led the women to their first title in an international Women's Twenty20 tournament during the 2010 ICC Women's Cricket Challenge. Both the West Indies' men's and women's teams made it to the semi-finals of the 2012 ICC World Twenty20 and 2012 ICC Women's World Twenty20 under the captaincies of Darren Sammy and Merissa Aguilleira respectively; the third time the men's and women's teams from the same country have done this in the ICC World Twenty20 after Australia's men and women's teams achieved the feat in 2010 and 2012. This feat was repeated for the 2014 ICC World Twenty20 and 2014 ICC Women's World Twenty20 when the West Indies' men's and women's teams made it to the semi-finals again under the captaincies of Darren Sammy and Merissa Aguillera. This was bettered in 2016 when both the West Indies' men's and women's teams not only made it to the semi-finals but won the tournaments for the 2016 ICC World Twenty20 and 2016 ICC Women's World Twenty20 under the captaincies of Darren Sammy and Stafanie Taylor. Along with men and women's teams from New Zealand (in 2016), England (2016), South Africa (2014), and Australia (2012 and 2010) who also made it the semi-finals in the previous tournaments, this was the eighth time men's and women's teams from the same country have reached the semi-finals in the same year of the ICC World Twenty20. It was also only the second time (after Australia in 2010) that men's and women's teams from the same country have reached the final in the same year of the ICC's premier Twenty20 tournaments. Merissa Aguilleira also led the West Indies women to its best result in Women's ODI cricket when the team finished second in the 2013 Women's Cricket World Cup (bettering their previous best finish in the Women's World Cup of fifth place in 2005). Their previous best result had been under Stephanie Power when she led the West Indies to second place in the 2003 IWCC Trophy. Aguilleira is also the most successful West Indies women's captain in one-day internationals, winning 32 of 55 matches. The only women's captain who has led her side to a victory in a women's Test match is Louise Browne in the 1976/77 Test series against India.

== See also ==
- List of West Indian Test cricketers
- List of West Indian ODI cricketers
- Development of the Test captaincy of West Indies
