= International cricket in 1959–60 =

International cricket season

The 1959–60 international cricket season was from September 1959 to April 1960.

== Season overview ==
International tours
Start date	Home team	Away team	Results [Matches]			
Start date	Home team	Away team	Test	ODI	FC	LA
13 November 1959	Pakistan	Australia	0–2 [3]	—	—	—
12 December 1959	India	Australia	1–2 [5]	—	—	—
6 January 1960	West Indies	England	0–1 [5]	—	—	—
23 January 1960	India	Ceylon	—	—	1–0 [1]	—

== November ==
=== Australia in Pakistan ===
Test series
No.	Date	Home captain	Away captain	Venue	Result
Test 479	13–18 November	Fazal Mahmood	Richie Benaud	Bangabandhu National Stadium, Dhaka	Australia by 8 wickets
Test 480	21–26 November	Imtiaz Ahmed	Richie Benaud	Lahore Stadium, Lahore	Australia by 7 wickets
Test 481	4–9 December	Fazal Mahmood	Richie Benaud	National Stadium, Karachi	Match drawn

== December ==
=== Australia in India ===
Test series
No.	Date	Home captain	Away captain	Venue	Result
Test 482	12–16 December	Gulabrai Ramchand	Richie Benaud	Feroz Shah Kotla Ground, Delhi	Australia by an innings and 127 runs
Test 483	19–24 December	Gulabrai Ramchand	Richie Benaud	Green Park, Kanpur	India by 119 runs
Test 484	1–6 January	Gulabrai Ramchand	Richie Benaud	Brabourne Stadium, Bombay	Match drawn
Test 486	13–17 January	Gulabrai Ramchand	Richie Benaud	Corporation Stadium, Madras	Australia by an innings and 55 runs
Test 487	23–28 January	Gulabrai Ramchand	Richie Benaud	Eden Gardens, Calcutta	Match drawn

== January ==
=== England in the West Indies ===
Test Series
No.	Date	Home captain	Away captain	Venue	Result
Test 485	6–12 January	Gerry Alexander	Peter May	Kensington Oval, Bridgetown	Match drawn
Test 488	28 Jan–3 February	Gerry Alexander	Peter May	Queen's Park Oval, Port of Spain	England by 256 runs
Test 489	17–23 February	Gerry Alexander	Peter May	Sabina Park, Kingston	Match drawn
Test 490	9–15 March	Gerry Alexander	Colin Cowdrey	Bourda, Georgetown	Match drawn
Test 491	25–31 March	Gerry Alexander	Colin Cowdrey	Queen's Park Oval, Port of Spain	Match drawn

=== Ceylon in India ===
MJ Gopalan Trophy
No.	Date	Home captain	Away captain	Venue	Result
FC Match	23–25 January	Kripal Singh	Vernon Prins	Kajamalai Stadium, Tiruchi	India by 8 wickets
