= International cricket in 1956–57 =

International cricket season

The 1956–57 international cricket season was from September 1956 to April 1957.

== Season overview ==
International tours
Start date	Home team	Away team	Results [Matches]			
Start date	Home team	Away team	Test	ODI	FC	LA
11 October 1956	Pakistan	Australia	1–0 [1]	—	—	—
19 October 1956	India	Australia	0–2 [3]	—	—	—
10 November 1956	Ceylon	India	—	—	0–0 [2]	—
24 December 1956	South Africa	England	2–2 [5]	—	—	—
30 December 1956	India	England	—	—	0–2 [2]	—
2 March 1957	Jamaica	England	—	—	0–2 [3]	—
13 April 1957	Ceylon	India	—	—	1–0 [1]	—

== October ==
=== Australia in Pakistan ===
One-off Test match
No.	Date	Home captain	Away captain	Venue	Result
Test 430	11–17 February	Abdul Kardar	Ian Johnson	National Stadium, Karachi	Pakistan by 9 wickets

=== Australia in India ===
Test series
No.	Date	Home captain	Away captain	Venue	Result
Test 431	19–23 October	Polly Umrigar	Ian Johnson	Corporation Stadium, Madras	Australia by an innings and 5 runs
Test 432	26–31 October	Polly Umrigar	Ray Lindwall	Brabourne Stadium, Bombay	Match drawn
Test 433	2–6 November	Polly Umrigar	Ian Johnson	Eden Gardens, Calcutta	Australia by 94 runs

== November ==
=== India in Ceylon ===
Two-day Match series
No.	Date	Home captain	Away captain	Venue	Result
FC Match	10–12 November	Vernon Prins	Polly Umrigar	P Saravanamuttu Stadium, Colombo	Match drawn
FC Match	17–19 November	Gamini Goonesena	Polly Umrigar	P Saravanamuttu Stadium, Colombo	Match drawn

== December ==
=== England in South Africa ===
Test series
No.	Date	Home captain	Away captain	Venue	Result
Test 434	24–29 December	Clive van Ryneveld	Peter May	New Wanderers Stadium, Johannesburg	England by 131 runs
Test 435	1–5 January	Jackie McGlew	Peter May	Newlands, Cape Town	England by 312 runs
Test 436	25–30 January	Clive van Ryneveld	Peter May	Kingsmead, Durban	Match drawn
Test 437	15–20 February	Clive van Ryneveld	Peter May	New Wanderers Stadium, Johannesburg	South Africa by 17 runs
Test 438	1–5 March	Clive van Ryneveld	Peter May	Crusaders Ground, Port Elizabeth	South Africa by 58 runs

=== England in India ===
First-class series
No.	Date	Home team	Away team	Venue	Result
Match 1	30 Dec–1 January	Dr Roy's XI	C. G. Howard's XI	Eden Gardens, Calcutta	C. G. Howard's XI by 142 runs
Match 2	5–8 January	President's XI	C. G. Howard's XI	Brabourne Stadium, Bombay	C. G. Howard's XI by 152 runs

== March ==
=== England in the West Indies ===
First-class series
No.	Date	Home captain	Away captain	Venue	Result
Match 1	2–5 March	Allan Rae	Desmond Eagar	Sabina Park, Kingston	Match drawn
Match 2	15–19 March	Allan Rae	Desmond Eagar	Sabina Park, Kingston	Duke of Norfolk's XI by 3 wickets
Match 3	21–26 March	Allan Rae	Desmond Eagar	Sabina Park, Kingston	Duke of Norfolk's XI by 7 wickets

== April ==
=== India in Ceylon ===
MJ Gopalan Trophy
No.	Date	Home captain	Away captain	Venue	Result
FC Match	13–15 April	Not mentioned	Not mentioned	P Saravanamuttu Stadium, Colombo	Ceylon by 5 wickets
