= Asgarali =

Asgarali is a surname. Notable people with the surname include:

- Gregory Asgarali (born 1947), Trinidadian cricketer
- Nyron Asgarali (1920–2006), Trinidadian cricketer
