= International cricket in 1958–59 =

International cricket season

The 1958–59 international cricket season was from September 1958 to April 1959.

== Season overview ==
International tours
Start date	Home team	Away team	Results [Matches]			
Start date	Home team	Away team	Test	ODI	FC	LA
28 November 1958	India	West Indies	0–3 [5]	—	—	—
5 December 1958	Australia	England	4–0 [5]	—	—	—
20 February 1959	Pakistan	West Indies	2–1 [3]	—	—	—
27 February 1959	New Zealand	England	0–1 [2]	—	—	—
7 March 1959	Ceylon	India	—	—	0–0 [1]	—

== November ==
=== West Indies in India ===
Test series
No.	Date	Home captain	Away captain	Venue	Result
Test 459	28 Nov–3 December	Ghulam Ahmed	Gerry Alexander	Brabourne Stadium, Bombay	Match drawn
Test 461	12–17 December	Ghulam Ahmed	Gerry Alexander	Green Park, Kanpur	West Indies by 203 runs
Test 463	31 Dec–4 January	Ghulam Ahmed	Gerry Alexander	Eden Gardens, Calcutta	West Indies by an innings and 336 runs
Test 465	21–26 January	Vinoo Mankad	Gerry Alexander	Corporation Stadium, Madras	West Indies by 295 runs
Test 467	6–11 February	Hemu Adhikari	Gerry Alexander	Feroz Shah Kotla Ground, Delhi	Match drawn

== December ==
=== England in Australia ===
The Ashes Test series
No.	Date	Home captain	Away captain	Venue	Result
Test 460	5–10 December	Richie Benaud	Peter May	The Gabba, Brisbane	Australia by 8 wickets
Test 462	31 Dec–5 January	Richie Benaud	Peter May	Melbourne Cricket Ground, Melbourne	Australia by 8 wickets
Test 464	9–15 January	Richie Benaud	Peter May	Sydney Cricket Ground, Sydney	Match drawn
Test 466	30 Jan–5 February	Richie Benaud	Peter May	Adelaide Oval, Adelaide	Australia by 10 wickets
Test 468	13–18 February	Richie Benaud	Peter May	Melbourne Cricket Ground, Melbourne	Australia by 9 wickets

== February ==
=== West Indies in Pakistan ===
Test series
No.	Date	Home captain	Away captain	Venue	Result
Test 469	20–25 February	Fazal Mahmood	Gerry Alexander	National Stadium, Karachi	Pakistan by 10 wickets
Test 471	6–8 March	Fazal Mahmood	Gerry Alexander	Bangabandhu National Stadium, Dacca	Pakistan by 41 runs
Test 473	26–31 March	Imtiaz Ahmed	Gerry Alexander	Bagh-e-Jinnah Stadium, Lahore	West Indies by an innings and 156 runs

=== England in New Zealand ===
Test series
No.	Date	Home captain	Away captain	Venue	Result
Test 470	27 Feb–2 March	John Reid	Peter May	AMI Stadium, Christchurch	England by an innings and 99 runs
Test 472	14–18 March	John Reid	Peter May	Eden Park, Auckland	Match drawn

== March ==
=== India in Ceylon ===
MJ Gopalan Trophy
No.	Date	Home captain	Away captain	Venue	Result
FC Match	7–9 March	Vernon Prins	Coimbatarao Gopinath	P Saravanamuttu Stadium, Colombo	Match drawn
