= West Indian cricket team in England in 1957 =

International cricket tour

The West Indies cricket team toured England in the 1957 season to play a five-match Test series against England.

England won the series 3-0 with two matches drawn. West Indies' spinners Sonny Ramadhin and Alf Valentine were unable to repeat the success they had on the 1950 tour, and though the young Wes Hall was in the team, the fast bowling was not yet as potent as it would be in a few years, and Hall did not play in the Tests.

== West Indies side ==
The West Indies team was captained by John Goddard, who had led the successful 1950 team. The vice-captain was Clyde Walcott but towards the end of the tour, when both Goddard and Walcott were injured, the team was captained in some matches by Frank Worrell who "showed unmistaken gifts of leadership", according to Wisden Cricketers' Almanack.

The full side was:

- John Goddard, captain
- Clyde Walcott, vice-captain
- Gerry Alexander, wicketkeeper
- Nyron Asgarali
- Denis Atkinson
- Tom Dewdney
- Andy Ganteaume
- Roy Gilchrist
- Wes Hall
- Rohan Kanhai
- Bruce Pairaudeau
- Sonny Ramadhin
- Collie Smith
- Gary Sobers
- Alf Valentine
- Everton Weekes
- Frank Worrell

Kanhai was used as the reserve wicketkeeper and, because his batting was deemed stronger than Alexander's, was used as the wicketkeeper in the first three Test matches, though Wisden said that he was "little more than a stopper". Ganteaume, a wicketkeeper during his early career with Trinidad, did not keep wicket on the tour.

Alexander, Asgarali, Gilchrist, Hall and Kanhai had not played Test cricket before this tour; all except Hall made their Test debuts during the series. Of the other players who had played Test cricket before 1957, only Ganteaume did not make an appearance during the Test series.

== Test series summary ==
=== First Test ===
30 May–4 June 1957
(5-day match)
Scorecard

England	v	West Indies
186 (79.4 overs); PE Richardson 47; S Ramadhin 7/49 (31 overs)		474 (191.4 overs); OG Smith 161; JC Laker 4/119 (54 overs)
583/4d (258 overs); PBH May 285*; S Ramadhin 2/179 (98 overs)		72/7 (60 overs); ED Weekes 33; GAR Lock 3/31 (27 overs)

Match drawn
Edgbaston, Birmingham
Umpires: D Davies and CS Elliott

- England won the toss and elected to bat.
- 2 June was taken as a rest day.
- RB Kanhai and R Gilchrist (both WIN) made their Test debuts.
- S Ramadhin's 98 overs remains the first-class record for balls bowled in an innings.

=== Second Test ===
20–22 June 1957
(5-day match)
Scorecard

West Indies	v	England
127 (51.3 overs); RB Kanhai 34; TE Bailey 7/44 (21 overs)		424 (123.3 overs); MC Cowdrey 152; R Gilchrist 4/115 (36.3 overs)
261 (96.1 overs); ED Weekes 90; TE Bailey 4/54 (22 overs)

England won by an innings and 36 runs
Lord's, London
Umpires: D Davies and CS Elliott

- West Indies won the toss and elected to bat.
- The match was scheduled for five days but completed in three.
- DV Smith (ENG) and NS Asgarali (WIN) made their Test debuts.

=== Third Test ===
4–9 July 1957
(5-day match)
Scorecard

England	v	West Indies
619/6d (212 overs); TW Graveney 258; OG Smith 2/61 (25 overs)		372 (160.4 overs); FMM Worrell 191*; FS Trueman 5/63 (30 overs)
64/1 (17 overs); TW Graveney 28*; R Gilchrist 1/21 (7 overs)		367 (f/o) (148.2 overs); OG Smith 168; JB Statham 5/118 (41.2 overs)

Match drawn
Trent Bridge, Nottingham
Umpires: JS Buller and FS Lee

- England won the toss and elected to bat.
- 7 July was taken as a rest day.
- DW Richardson (ENG) made his Test debut.

=== Fourth Test ===
25–27 July 1957
(5-day match)
Scorecard

West Indies	v	England
142 (85.3 overs); RB Kanhai 47; PJ Loader 6/36 (20.3 overs)		279 (124.2 overs); PBH May 69; FMM Worrell 7/70 (38.2 overs)
132 (36.2 overs); CL Walcott 35; PJ Loader 3/50 (14 overs)

England won by an innings and 5 runs
Headingley, Leeds
Umpires: JS Buller and D Davies

- West Indies won the toss and elected to bat.
- The match was scheduled for five days but completed in three.
- FCM Alexander (WIN) made his Test debut.

=== Fifth Test ===
22–24 August 1957
(5-day match)
Scorecard

England	v	West Indies
412 (176.3 overs); TW Graveney 164; S Ramadhin 4/107 (53.3 overs)		89 (56.4 overs); GS Sobers 39; GAR Lock 5/28 (21.4 overs)
		86 (f/o) (41 overs); GS Sobers 42; GAR Lock 6/20 (16 overs)

England won by an innings and 237 runs
The Oval, London
Umpires: DE Davies and FS Lee

- England won the toss and elected to bat.
- The match was scheduled for five days but completed in three.

== External sources ==
- CricketArchive – tour summaries

== Annual reviews ==
- Playfair Cricket Annual 1958
- Wisden Cricketers' Almanack 1958
