= Van Ryneveld =

van Ryneveld is an Afrikaans surname. Notable people with the surname include:

- Clive van Ryneveld (1928–2018), South African cricketer
- Pierre van Ryneveld (1891–1972), South African World War I flying ace, Royal Air Force officer, and South African Air Force general
