= Nyron =

Nyron is a male given name. Notable people with this name include:

- Nyron Asgarali (1920–2006), West Indian cricket player
- Nyron Nosworthy (born 1980), English-born Jamaican football player
- Nyron Wau (born 1982), Dutch football player
