= Nyron Asgarali =

Trinidadian cricketer (1920–2006)

Personal information
- Full name: Nyron Sultan Asgarali
- Born: 28 December 1920; Saint James, Port of Spain, Trinidad
- Died: 5 November 2006 (aged 85); Trinidad and Tobago
- Batting: Right-handed
- Bowling: Right-arm medium
- Relatives: Gregory Asgarali (son)

International information
- National side: West Indies
- Test debut: 20 June 1957 v England
- Last Test: 22 August 1957 v England

Career statistics
Competition	Test	FC
Matches	2	50
Runs scored	62	2,761
Batting average	15.50	32.86
100s/50s	0/0	7/8
Top score	29	141*
Balls bowled	–	2,235
Wickets	–	23
Bowling average	–	42.00
5 wickets in innings	–	0
10 wickets in match	–	0
Best bowling	–	4/72
Catches/stumpings	0/–	29/–
- Source: Cricinfo, 30 October 2022

Nyron Sultan Asgarali (28 December 1920 – 5 November 2006) was a Trinidadian cricketer who played in two Test matches on the West Indian tour of England in 1957.

Asgarali was a right-handed opening batsman and an occasional medium-paced bowler whose first-class cricket career lasted more than 20 years but included only 50 matches, 21 of them on the 1957 tour of England.

Asgarali was 30 before he made a first-class century, but then made several in inter-island and other matches for Trinidad and Tobago. He also spent several years playing Lancashire League cricket and his knowledge of English conditions was probably a contributory factor in his selection for the 1957 tour at the age of 36. The tour marked the transition between the early 1950s batting dominance of the Three Ws (Everton Weekes, Clyde Walcott, and Frank Worrell) and the emergence of new talent in Garfield Sobers, Rohan Kanhai, and Collie Smith, and Asgarali was seen as a back-up rather than a front-line batsman. But consistent scoring in county games, plus unexpected defeat in the first Test at Edgbaston, led to him being called up for the second Test at Lord's. He made a first-innings duck, and, batting at No 4, a second-innings 26, and was then dropped. Recalled for the final Test at The Oval, he made his highest Test score of 29 out of a total of 89 – Worrell was dismissed early, but Asgarali and Sobers, who made 39, took the score to 68 before the second wicket fell, so the last nine wickets fell for just 21 runs.

On the 1957 tour as a whole, Asgarali made 1,011 runs at an average just below 30.

Asgarali made no further Test appearances, though he played in first-class games in Trinidad into his forties. His son, Gregory, was also a first-class cricketer for Trinidad and Tobago.
