= Development of the Test captaincy of West Indies =

This is a chronological list of defining events in the Development of the Test captaincy of the West Indies cricket team.

== 1920s ==
January 1928

H.B.G.Austin, President of the new West Indies Cricket Board of Control, assumed captaincy of the first Test-playing tour of England in 1928. However, at the age of 50, he was to stand aside before the tour.

Karl Nunes appointed captain instead for inaugural West Indies tour of England. "Leadership was a white function. So in the economy, so in cricket."

M.C.C. Committee member Mr R H Mallett, 70, was charged to act as West Indian team manager, as he had done in 1906 and 1923.

== 1930s ==
February 1930

The West Indies Board named different captains for the four Tests against touring M.C.C. from the colony where each match was played, including 42-year-old Nelson Betancourt who was the choice in Trinidad for his sole Test appearance.

April 1930

R.H.Mallett, about to return to England after managing the 1929–30 MCC touring party, met the West Indies Board and recommended Jackie Grant as captain for the Australian tour, even though Grant had no experience of captaincy and had never played in West Indies before. In his biography Grant confessed "I was younger than all of the sixteen players, save three; and most of these sixteen had already played for the West Indies, while I had not. Yet I was the captain. It could not be disputed that my white colour was a major factor in my being given this post."

"A policy at the time was to choose a nucleus of six players for the Test team and then complete the eleven with others from the 'home' territory," wrote Michael Manley. This is a bit of an exaggeration – a nucleus of seven or eight perhaps, because team selection was now in the hands of the West Indies Cricket Board rather than the colony where the Test match was played.

1933 to 1934–35

Jack Grant was heavily engaged in education in Grenada but was retained as West Indian captain for the 1933 tour of England and for the visit by MCC in 1934–35.

When injury forced Grant to leave the field in the Kingston Test, he asked Learie Constantine to take over.

1938–39

The Board appointed one selector to represent each region: For the 1939 tour party none had strong cricketing credentials.

"In selecting captains .. the authorities were not consciously against Headley and Constantine…… the selectors acted to preserve opportunity for their own class… confident that the best interests of the sport were being protected." (Michael Manley)

February 1939

When Jackie Grant gave up cricket to become a missionary (like his grandfather), his brother Rolph Grant became captain for the 1939 tour rather than George Headley "The appointment of Rolph Grant was historically necessary, for British colonialism based itself on the idea that the colonised were inferior people who were incapable of self-rule. The whites in the colonies subscribed to this fallacy, so they could not appoint a black skipper : to do so would have been tantamount to rejecting the cardinal logic of colonialism."

== 1940s ==
1947–48

"N.N. Nethersole, lawyer and deputy leader of Norman Manley's People's National Party, launched his campaign on George Headley's behalf." He challenged the Cricket Board's outlook that property ownership endows with the characteristics of leadership. '"[His] constancy and judgement, necessary for national and international negotiation, may well have been sharpened by the arguments and the efforts to avoid pitfalls of insularity in selection in the board room of the West Indian Cricket Board of Control.'

For one Test in Barbados George Headley became the first black man appointed to captain West Indies. But then Gerry Gomez and John Goddard were given the captaincy in the remainder of the series against England.

1948–49

John Goddard was appointed for the tour of India, and a year later after some hesitation confirmed that he would also be available to lead West Indies in England in 1950.

The selectors were Edgar Marsden (Trinidad), Noel Nethersole (Jamaica), Frederick Clairmonte (Barbados) and Alec Drayton and Maurice Green (British Guiana), while the on-tour committee was simply made up of the white members of the team – Goddard, Gomez and Stollmeyer.

== 1950s ==
April 1951

Goddard was retained as captain for tour of Australia. However, his criticisms of the Board for agreeing to the match itinerary for the Australian tour led to him being excluded from West Indian team for three years. During the series against Australia, West Indies lost 4–1, as the senior players declined to offer him any on the field advice after they felt he had taken all the credit for the victory in England in 1950. "He succumbed to his own tactical deficiencies" (Michael Manley).

1952–53

Jeffrey Stollmeyer became captain starting with a Test series against the visiting 1953 Indians. His cricket knowledge unquestionably made him worthy of the position of captain.

1954–55

Denis Atkinson, Stollmeyer's deputy, led West Indies in three of the five Tests against Australia. "About 2,000 people protested, at the Kingston Race Course, against the appointment of Atkinson, the Barbados all-rounder, as captain of the West Indies for the fourth and fifth Tests against the Australians. They wanted Frank Worrell, who was named vice-captain."

1955–56

Atkinson nevertheless was kept on as captain of a West Indian team in New Zealand in 1955-56, with John Goddard manager (these appointments made nearly two years before the tour so they were not connected with Atkinson being rewarded for scoring a double century against Australia).

WI Board representatives such as Noel Pierce (Barbados) continued to man the selection panel but non-whites like the British Guiana secretary Ken Wishart who had opposed Atkinson's captaincy, and Berkeley Gaskin, and players a cut above like Gerry Gomez began to be appointed, as in 1957.

October 1956

For the 1957 England tour "John Goddard was restored from retirement as captain (passing over more suitable candidates in Jeffrey Stollmeyer and even Denis Atkinson), and Clyde Walcott replaced Worrell as vice-captain – it was still several years before a black man could be accepted as full captain. He (Walcott) would not have been the "easier option" which the administrators had imagined." Goddard was a failure as captain. "That his selection in 1957 was a travesty was not his fault" (Manley).

1958

Gerry Alexander was appointed captain for home series against Pakistan 1957–58 and for the next two years. An "Alexander Must Go" campaign was mounted by CLR James, then the editor of The Nation. "The idea of Alexander captaining a side on which Frank Worrell is playing," he wrote, "is to me quite revolting." Whether or not James was aware at the time that Worrell had in fact allegedly been offered the captaincy, but declined it while he completed his economics degree at Manchester University – which kept him out of the side in 1958 and 1959 while Alexander was captain – is not clear. The fact that Alexander had in fact only played two Tests before, neither with any great distinction, only added further to the controversy over his appointment, since it was questionable whether he was even worth his place in the side at the time. Alexander, in fact, made a decent job of the captaincy and restored some focus to a side very much in transition – as well as improving his own form with both bat and gloves. His term as captain coincided with the retirement of batting greats Everton Weekes and Clyde Walcott, the decline of the great spin-bowlers Ramadhin and Valentine, and the debuts of men such as Conrad Hunte, Rohan Kanhai, Gary Sobers, Lance Gibbs and Wes Hall, all of whom became stars of the side in the next decade. He failed to deal so well with fast bowler Roy Gilchrist, although this was largely Gilchrist's own fault due to a habit of persistently bowling dangerous bouncers and beamers.

== 1960s ==
1960

"Alexander told the selectors that the time had come for Worrell to take over the leadership but they pressed him to continue. He eventually agreed with some reluctance" (Manley). He is generally thought of as the last white man to captain West Indies (though in fact, while fair-skinned, he was mixed race). While he was leading the Test side against England, it was announced that Frank Worrell would take the team to Australia.

1960–61 to 1963

Gerry Gomez was appointed Chairman of Selectors and also manager of the tour of Australia. "I shall not let this question rest," thundered C L R James in The Nation, "This fooling with West Indies' captaincy has gone on too long".

Worrell was at last made captain for the Australia and England tours, and he proved to be an outstanding captain. "Graceful, poised and dignified, Worrell embodied all that was noble and deeply attractive in the West Indian character. Articulate, sensitive and West Indian to the core, he gave substance to the view that unity should be the hallmark of the region and its cricket team. He transformed a bunch of talented and individual players into a unified team." Allan Rae, former opening batsman and a lawyer who would soon become a catalyst for progress on the Board, was now a selector.

1964

On his retirement, Worrell recommended that Garfield Sobers should take over as captain in preference to long-serving understudy Conrad Hunte. "There was speculation that Hunte's continuous proselytising for his [moral rearmament] beliefs even within the dressing-room told against him." (Cricinfo) Sobers led West Indies in 39 Test matches and won series victories against all comers. Sir Frank Worrell was made team manager against Australia 1964–65. His potential managerial contribution to West Indies cricket was cut short by his early death in 1967.

March 1968

Sobers faltered at Port of Spain, in the 4th Test against England when his declaration on the final day saw England scramble home with just three minutes left in the game. Team manager Everton Weekes distanced himself from the decision to make the declaration.

West Indies did not win another series under Sobers.

== 1970s ==
1970

Sobers captained the Rest of The World sides against England (and again in Australia). At the end of the series the "politically unconscious Sobers" (Manley) participated in a double wicket tournament in Rhodesia, causing uproar and demands that he should be sacked as captain. He was forced to apologise, and, with no alternative captain in view, "a grateful Caribbean grabbed the apology with both hands." (Manley)

1973

Sobers declared himself unavailable as a player on being asked by the West Indies Cricket Board of Control to prove his fitness, so he was replaced as captain by Rohan Kanhai for the 1973 home series against Australia. Sobers had "... led a strong side effectively but not shown the capacity to lift a weak or ageing side" (Manley)

"Cecil Marley, president of the West Indies Cricket Board, asked me who I would recommend as my successor," wrote Sobers. "I opted initially for David Holford but I didn't think he would be accepted as my nomination because he was my relative. I offered Clive Lloyd as an alternative choice but Clive had not even been invited to join the squad, so my third choice would be Rohan Kanhai."

Kanhai retained the captaincy for the 1973 tour of England, which West Indies won 2–0. "Kanhai is credited with restoring both discipline and morale to the side" (Manley).

Suggestions of regional bias caused by each territory having a representative on the selection panel led to a reduction to three selectors only. This panel would be joined by the captain.

25 May 1974

Clive Lloyd was appointed captain for the 1974–75 tour of India. Lloyd lasted as captain for ten years, working to make cricketers from different nations and backgrounds a proud, unified team throughout his time. He won the one-day World Cup tournaments in 1975 and again in 1979.

1976

West Indies retained the Wisden Trophy against England 3–0: "A third factor is apt to be overlooked because of the brilliance of the batting and bowling. It was Lloyd's captaincy. He led his men with a sure touch, kept them together, maintained discipline and began to act as the father figure of the side" (Manley). Clyde Walcott resumed as team manager, "As a manager who had played the game, he lent credibility to what he was trying to instill in the players," said Deryck Murray

1977–78

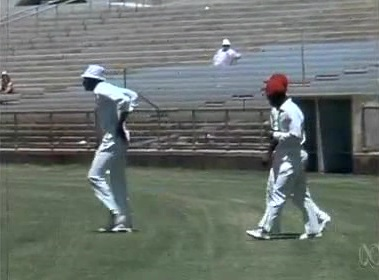
Clive Lloyd leading out the West Indian WSC team

Clive Lloyd joined Kerry Packer's World Series Cricket (WSC) in 1977. He quit the West Indies captaincy when Haynes, Austin and Murray were dropped from the team for playing in Packer's World Series and all the remaining WSC members in the team including Richards, Greenidge, Garner, Roberts and Holding also immediately dropped out.

Alvin Kallicharran became stand-in captain for the remainder of the series against Australia and on the tour of India in 1978-79.

1979–80

Clive Lloyd was reinstated for the 1979 World Cup and 1979–80 tour of Australia. Walcott was again World Cup manager. Apologies were required after players made indisciplined responses to umpiring decisions in New Zealand (Willie Rodriguez was then manager) but the team kept winning. One factor was that Dennis Waight, engaged as trainer and physio, enforced a rigorous training regime.

== 1980s ==
1982–83

A West Indian rebel team led by Lawrence Rowe toured South Africa. It included players like Alvin Kallicharran, Colin Croft, Collis King and Sylvester Clarke. Deprived of its full-strength, West Indies lost the 1983 World Cup to India.

1983-4

Lloyd was persuaded to change his mind after 1983 World Cup and stay on as captain for the tour of India and a triangular ODI tournament. Clive Lloyd's career as West Indies captain came to an end after series in Australia in 1984–85.

1985

Vivian Richards was appointed captain starting with ODI series in Pakistan. Vice-captain Desmond Haynes captained the West Indies touring party on a Test visit to Pakistan.

== 1990s ==
1991

Richards is the only West Indies captain never to lose a Test series, which reflected his fierce will to win and the way he drove his team. After 50 Tests in which he retained West Indies' place as the prevailing force in world Test cricket, Viv Richards retired as West Indies Test captain. "He was impatient with error... but commanded respect and loyalty of the troops whom he led because he was a great player." (Manley)

1991–92

Jackie Hendriks was Chairman of Selectors when the Board appointed Richie Richardson. Desmond Haynes, the man being groomed for the role and Richards' vice-captain, was elbowed out of the captaincy ..... "that was when the Board failed to understand the importance of the influence of Haynes as a senior member of the Lloyd/Richards era being needed to make the transition, to bring the culture, the work ethic and the spirit of domination to another group."

1992

A poor showing by the West Indies in the 1992 World Cup in Australia and a young team reeling from the retirement of Richards, Greenidge and Marshall led to the West Indies calling on former skipper Rohan Kanhai as their first coach, appointed by the WICB in autumn 1992.

1994

Courtney Walsh appointed stand-in captain for the tours of India and New Zealand after Richie Richardson was ordered to rest because of "acute fatigue syndrome".

Kanhai complained about disciplinary problems among the West Indian players, and relinquished the job in 1995.

1994–95

Richardson returned as captain for the home series against Australia but without Haynes to give his support "WICB's controversial eligibility rule was used to exclude Haynes, the Barbadian batsmen, from the home series against Australia. Haynes, who was 39 at the time, had missed one match during that year's regional competition because of a professional contract with Western Province in South Africa and was left out of the West Indies team."

1995–96

Wes Hall manager in England with Andy Roberts as coach. Disciplinary measures needed : Winston Benjamin was sent home from the tour of England.

At the end of the 1996 World Cup during which Kenya surprisingly beat West Indies at Pune, Richie Richardson resigned as captain. Andy Roberts was sacked as coach, and Wes Hall ended his term as team manager.

March 1996

Courtney Walsh became captain. The WICB persuaded Clive Lloyd who lived in England and was detached from the politics of West Indies cricket, to become Manager. Walsh was given a say in selection but Lloyd said that as manager he too should be on the selection panel proper, not simply on tour.

March 1997

Brian Lara became captain for the first time in the third Test against India in the absence of the injured Courtney Walsh and won the match by 38 runs so that WI won the series 1–0.

January 1998

Brian Lara appointed West Indies captain to succeed Courtney Walsh, who was sacked after West Indies tour of Pakistan. (Walsh did well initially with series wins over New Zealand, India and Sri Lanka. A loss to Australia and a whitewash in Pakistan followed).

The WICB initially rejected the selectors' recommendation of Brian Lara as captain instead of Courtney Walsh but Lara nevertheless appointed, and won the series against Mike Atherton's England.

1998–99

Holed up in a London Airport hotel on its way to South Africa, the team made demands on conditions and retainer contracts : Lara as captain and Hooper as vice captain were sacked, then reinstated. "The junior players found themselves dragged into a dispute in which the seniors were largely seeking a pay increase for themselves" (Wisden).

West Indies manager Clive Lloyd thought it was a mistake to go ahead with 1998–99 South Africa tour after the players' protest over pay and conditions, made in London between planes to South Africa. Bryan Davis, a critic, said 'Brian [Lara] is an enigma and he displays the best of himself and the worst. Being one of the leaders put him into a powerful position and that really started the decline of West Indies cricket'".

March 1999

Criticism grew and Lara's captaincy became beset by difficulties. Marshall was unable to continue as coach while undergoing cancer treatment, so Viv Richards carried out the coaching role with manager Clive Lloyd. Then vice-captain Carl Hooper suddenly retired and withdrew from 1999 World Cup team.

October 1999

Malcolm Marshall's three-year term as coach and Lloyd's stint as manager ended.

Marshall died on 4 November.

== 2000s ==
Feb 2000

On 25 February 2000 Lara resigns as West Indies captain after New Zealand defeat, owing to lack of success in two years in the post, and took a sabbatical.

March 2000

Jimmy Adams appointed skipper for the series at home against Zimbabwe and then in England. Franklyn Rose and Chris Gayle were not considered for the tour of Australia, according to selector Mike Findlay because of "attitude problems during the trip to England"

2001

After two series wins, against Pakistan and Zimbabwe, and then losses to England and Australia, Jimmy Adams quit. Carl Hooper became captain again (coming out of retirement at age 35).

Troubles continued around the team. Rumours that manager of the West Indies team, Ricky Skerritt, and coach Roger Harper would be replaced after 15 months of a three-year contract. Psychologist Joe Hoad, a qualified sports psychologist and son of 1930 West Indies captain Teddy Hoad, appointed to the West Indies team on tour in December 2000 was at odds with Skerritt. Hoad resigned citing "major problems" among the players, including general indifference, low fitness levels and an aversion to hard work.

31 March 2003

Brian Lara was appointed West Indies captain for a second time. Lara was reinstated after being persuaded by then president Wes Hall to return when Carl Hooper was dismissed after the West Indies' first round exit from the 2003 World Cup in South Africa.

"The angry Hooper refused to make a decision whether he would be available to play. After three days he declined to play under Lara, ending his Test career at the age of 36. They had been good friends. Now a firm friendship was ended.".

2004

Bennett King eventually accepted the job of coach on a three-year contract up to the 2007 World Cup. King was not only a member of the selection committee, he also had the casting vote, while the captain was not even to be a selector.

18 March 2005

Lara would not commit to play in the home series against South Africa during a protracted dispute over individual and team sponsorship, and Shivnarine Chanderpaul was appointed captain instead.

12 April 2006

Chanderpaul's resignation as skipper, following the tour of New Zealand. The selectors recalled Brian Lara, mainly on the insistence of new Trinidadian WICB president, Ken Gordon.

April 2007

At the end of 2007 World Cup Brian Lara retired. Ramnaresh Sarwan was appointed skipper. Chair of Selectors Gordon Greenidge said Daren Ganga was the only other person considered, but in July, Chris Gayle became skipper when Sarwan was injured, despite WICB having earlier vetoed his appointment.

October 2007

Six months' after Bennett King's resignation, John Dyson, formerly coach of Sri Lanka, took over as coach, to work with Gayle who retained the captaincy when Sarwan returned from injury, however thumb and hamstring injuries to Gayle left Dwayne Bravo as captain for both Twenty20 Internationals and the entire ODI series against South Africa.

against Bangladesh July 2009

- West Indies Squad

The original squad for the series was selected as below:

1. Chris Gayle (captain)
2. Denesh Ramdin (vice-captain)/(wicket-keeper)
3. Adrian Barath
4. Brendan Nash
5. Sulieman Benn
6. Dwayne Bravo
7. Shivnarine Chanderpaul
8. Narsingh Deonarine
9. Andrew Richardson
10. Ravi Rampaul
11. Ramnaresh Sarwan
12. Jerome Taylor
13. Runako Morton

However, the dispute between the West Indies Cricket Board and the West Indies Players' Association saw the First XI go on strike. As such, an entirely new team was selected for the Test series. Not a single member of the new squad had played in the side's most recent Test match against England two months earlier, and nine of the fifteen players in the squad had never played a Test.

1. Floyd Reifer (captain)
2. Darren Sammy (vice-captain)
3. Ryan Austin
4. David Bernard
5. Tino Best
6. Kraigg Brathwaite
7. Andre Creary
8. Travis Dowlin
9. Kevin McClean
10. Nikita Miller
11. Nelon Pascal
12. Omar Phillips
13. Dale Richards
14. Kemar Roach
15. Chadwick Walton (wicket-keeper)

== 2010s ==
November 2010

Darren Sammy made his Test Captaincy debut against Sri Lanka. This was 34th West Indies Test captain.

June 2014

Denesh Ramdin made his Test Captaincy debut against New Zealand. This was 35th West Indies Test captain.

October 2015

Jason Holder named 36th West Indies Test captain against Sri Lanka. replacing Denesh Ramdin

December 2017

Kraigg Brathwaite was named as the captain of the West Indies for the second Test in Holder's absence. became the 37th Test captain of West Indies.
