= Jimmy Blanckenberg =

South African cricketer

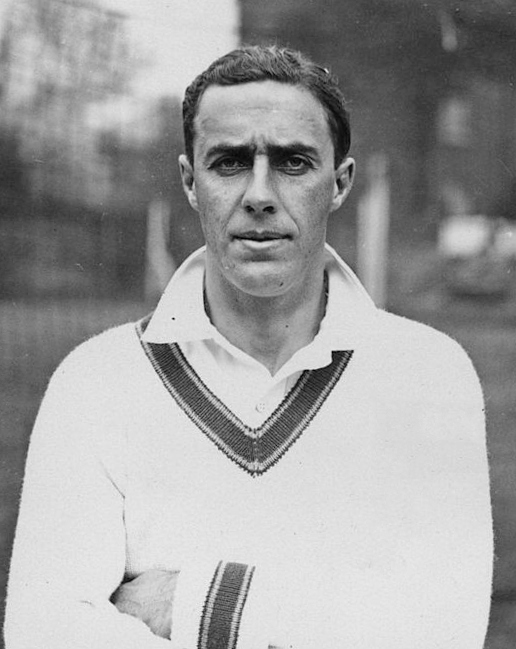
- Blanckenberg in May 1924

Personal information
- Full name: James Manuel Blanckenberg
- Born: 31 December 1892 or 1893; Cape Town, Cape Colony
- Died: c. 1955 (aged 61-62)
- Batting: Right-handed
- Bowling: Right-arm medium
- Relatives: Anthony van Ryneveld (nephew); Clive van Ryneveld (nephew)

International information
- National side: South Africa
- Test debut: 13 December 1913 v England
- Last Test: 16 August 1924 v England

Domestic team information
- Years: Team
- 1912/13–1922/23: Western Province
- 1923/24: Natal

Career statistics
Competition	Tests	First-class
Matches	18	74
Runs scored	455	2,232
Batting average	19.78	22.32
100s/50s	0/2	1/9
Top score	59	171
Balls bowled	3,888	13,455
Wickets	60	293
Bowling average	30.28	21.26
5 wickets in innings	4	21
10 wickets in match	0	3
Best bowling	6/76	9/78
Catches/stumpings	9/–	53/–
- Source: ESPNcricinfo

James Manuel Blanckenberg (31 December 1892 or 1893 (Note: Blanckenberg's year of birth is given variously as 1892 and 1893. Cricket Archive lists his year of birth as 1892, while ESPNcricinfo lists him as having been born in 1893.) – c. 1955) was a South African cricketer who played in eighteen Test matches for South Africa between 1913 and 1924. A right-arm medium pace bowler, Blanckenberg's first-class career spanned the years 1912 to 1924. In a career interrupted by the First World War, he played for Western Province except for his final domestic season, during which he represented Natal.

== Career ==
A nagging, accurate medium-pace bowler, Blanckenberg was most effective on the matting pitches that were prevalent in South Africa during his career. In 74 first-class appearances, he took five wickets in an innings on 21 occasions, with career best figures of 9 for 78 in a Currie Cup fixture for Western Province against Transvaal at Old Wanderers in January 1921. A useful middle/lower-order batsman, Blanckenberg's single first-class century came in December 1923 for Natal against his former team, Western Province, when he scored 171 in a fifth-wicket partnership with Dave Nourse worth 291.

Blanckenberg made his Test debut against England on 13 December 1913 during England's 1913/14 tour of South Africa. Although the tourists won the series 4–0, Blanckenberg finished with nineteen wickets, his tally in the series second only to that of England's Sydney Barnes. Blanckenberg became the first Test match batsman to start his career with five consecutive not out innings, a feat later matched by Frank Cameron, Alan Connolly and David Terbrugge. He would go on to win eighteen caps in total for South Africa, appearing in every Test match played by South Africa from his debut until the final Test of South Africa's tour of England in 1924, during which Blanckenberg struggled on the grass wickets used in England, taking just four wickets in five Tests at an average of 102.75. It was at the end of this tour that Blanckenberg played his final first-class match, for the South Africans against CI Thornton's XI at Scarborough.

Following his retirement from first-class cricket, Blanckenberg was the professional for Nelson in the Lancashire League from 1925 until 1928, for East Lancashire from 1929 until 1930, and for Bacup in 1931. He later played in the Bradford League for Keighley between 1933 and 1936.

== Later life and death ==
Little is known of Blanckenberg's life following his cricket career. He has long been rumoured to have been a Nazi sympathiser in the years leading up to and during the Second World War, much of this speculation based on his refusal to shake the hand of Learie Constantine during a Lancashire League game in the late 1920s. Constantine attributed Blanckenberg's rudeness to "the common prejudice of white South Africans against Negroes"; he repaid Blanckenberg by striking him with several bouncers during the match.

According to his nephew Clive van Ryneveld, the last the van Ryneveld family heard of Blanckenberg was that he had been a member of the Control Commission in charge of British-occupied Germany immediately after the Second World War. Most cricket sources list him as having died in West Berlin in about 1955, however this remains unverified; historian Robert Brooke believed this theory to have been disproved, and that Blanckenberg emigrated to South America.

== Notes ==
Sporting positions
Preceded by Ted McDonald	Nelson Cricket Club; Professional; 1925–1928	Succeeded by Learie Constantine
