= Anthony van Ryneveld =

South African cricketer (1925–2018)

Personal information
- Full name: Anthony John van Ryneveld
- Born: 17 November 1925; Plumstead, Cape Province, South Africa
- Died: 29 August 2018 (aged 92); Tokai, Western Cape, South Africa
- Batting: Right-handed
- Bowling: Right-arm fast-medium
- Relatives: Clive van Ryneveld (brother); Jimmy Blanckenberg (uncle); Stewart West (uncle)

Domestic team information
- Years: Team
- 1947: Oxford University

Career statistics
Competition	First-class
Matches	1
Runs scored	69
Batting average	34.50
100s/50s	–/1
Top score	50
Balls bowled	18
Wickets	0
Bowling average	–
5 wickets in innings	–
10 wickets in match	–
Best bowling	–
Catches/stumpings	–/–
- Source: Cricinfo, 7 June 2020

Anthony John van Ryneveld (7 November 1925 – 29 August 2018) was a South African first-class cricketer.

The son of Reginald Clive Berrangè van Ryneveld and Maria Alfreda Blanckenberg was born at Plumstead in Cape Town in November 1925. He was educated at the Diocesan College, before going up to Trinity College, Oxford as a Rhodes Scholar. While studying at Oxford, he made a single appearance in first-class cricket for Oxford University against the Free Foresters at Oxford in 1947. Batting twice in the match, he was dismissed for 50 runs in the Oxford first innings by Ian Peebles, while in their second innings he was dismissed for 19 runs by John Brocklebank.

He was better known in South Africa as a rugby union player. van Ryneveld was in business and served on the Old Diocesan Union Committee. He died at Tokai in Cape Town, three weeks after being diagnosed with cancer. Both his brother Clive and uncle Jimmy Blanckenberg played Test cricket for South Africa. Another uncle, Stewart West, was also a first-class cricketer.
