= Andre Percival =

Guyanese cricketer (born 1975)

Personal information
- Full name: Andre Ricardo Percival
- Born: 5 January 1975 (age 51); New Amsterdam, Guyana
- Batting: Left-handed
- Bowling: Right-arm medium

Domestic team information
- Years: Team
- 1991/92–2006: Guyana

Career statistics
| Competition | FC | LA | T20 |
|---|---|---|---|
| Matches | 31 | 22 | 4 |
| Runs scored | 1,271 | 234 | 17 |
| Batting average | 27.04 | 21.27 | – |
| 100s/50s | 0/7 | 0/0 | 0/0 |
| Top score | 96 | 45 | 17* |
| Balls bowled | 168 | 42 | 6 |
| Wickets | 3 | 1 | 1 |
| Bowling average | 32.33 | 13.00 | 5.00 |
| 5 wickets in innings | 0 | 0 | 0 |
| 10 wickets in match | 0 | 0 | 0 |
| Best bowling | 1/11 | 1/3 | 1/5 |
| Catches/stumpings | 31/– | 8/– | 1/– |
- Source: CricketArchive, 14 October 2011

Andre Ricardo Percival (born 5 January 1975) is a Guyanese former cricketer. He has played first-class, List A and Twenty20 cricket for Guyana in a career which spanned from 1992 to 2006. He captained the West Indies Under-19 cricket team in their 1994/95 series against England Under-19s.
