= Rohan Kanhai =

Guyanese cricketer

Personal information
- Full name: Rohan Bholalall Kanhai
- Born: 26 December 1935 (age 90); Port Mourant, British Guiana
- Height: 5 ft 7 in (170 cm)
- Batting: Right-handed
- Bowling: Right arm medium
- Role: Batsman, occasional wicket-keeper
- Relatives: Tyrone Etwaroo, (nephew)

International information
- National side: West Indies
- Test debut (cap 94): 30 May 1957 v England
- Last Test: 5 April 1974 v England
- ODI debut (cap 8): 5 September 1973 v England
- Last ODI: 21 June 1975 v Australia

Domestic team information
- Years: Team
- 1954–1974: British Guiana/Guyana
- 1959–1960: Berbice
- 1961/62: Western Australia
- 1964/65: Trinidad and Tobago
- 1968–1977: Warwickshire
- 1969/70: Tasmania
- 1974/75: Transvaal

Career statistics
Competition	Test	ODI	FC	LA
Matches	79	7	421	159
Runs scored	6,227	164	29,250	4,769
Batting average	47.53	54.66	49.40	39.09
100s/50s	15/28	0/2	86/120	7/26
Top score	256	55	256	126
Balls bowled	183	0	1,595	29
Wickets	0	–	19	1
Bowling average	–	–	54.68	17.00
5 wickets in innings	–	–	0	0
10 wickets in match	–	–	0	0
Best bowling	–	–	2/5	1/2
Catches/stumpings	50/–	4/–	325/7	70/1
Medal record
Men's Cricket
Representing West Indies
ICC Cricket World Cup
Winner	1975 England
- Source: Cricinfo, 31 October 2009

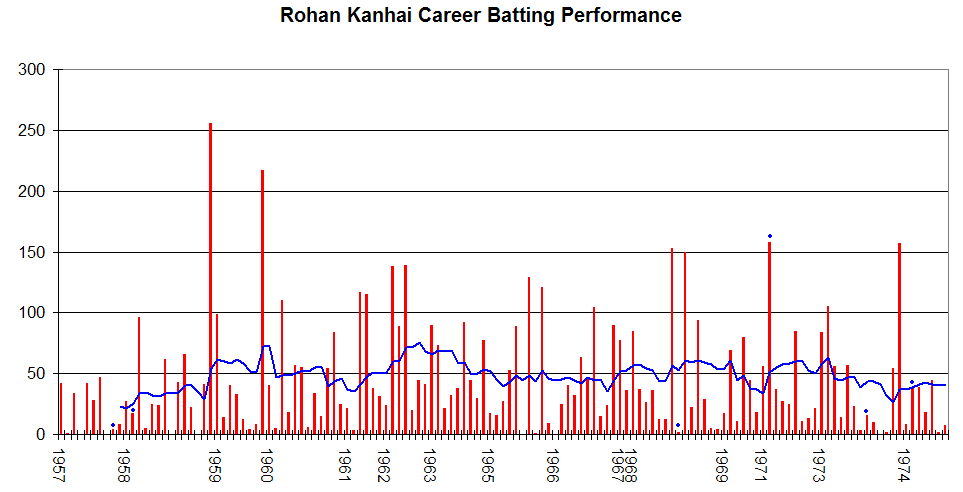
This graph details the Test Match performance of Rohan Kanhai. The red bars indicate the player's test match innings, while the blue line shows the average of the ten most recent innings at that point. Note that this average cannot be calculated for the first nine innings. The blue dots indicate innings in which Kanhai finished not-out.

Rohan Bholalall Kanhai (born 26 December 1935) is a Guyanese former cricketer of Indo-Guyanese origin who represented the West Indies in 79 Test matches. Kanhai featured on several great West Indian teams and is considered one of the best batsmen of the 1960s. C. L. R. James wrote in the New World Journal that Kanhai was "the high peak of West Indian cricketing development" and praised his "adventuresome" attitude. Kanhai was part of the West Indian team that won the inaugural, 1975 Cricket World Cup without losing a match.

== Biography ==
Kanhai made his Test debut during the West Indies' 1957 tour of England and kept wicket for his first three Tests, in addition to opening the batting. Gerry Alexander took over the gloves for the last two Tests. A right-handed batsman, Kanhai scored 6,227 runs in 79 Tests at a robust average of 47.53, with his highest score of 256 coming against India in a Test at Calcutta. When Kanhai retired, his batting average was the fifth-highest of all West Indian cricketers with more than 20 Tests. He was famous for his unorthodox shots, most notably the "falling hook" shot, in which he finished his follow-through lying on his back, famously during the West Indies' 1963 tour of England when his innings of 77 at The Oval won the match for the West Indies. In the 1975 World Cup final, when he was grey-haired and in his 40th year, his steady half-century set the platform for an explosive innings by Clive Lloyd.

Late in his career, he became West Indies captain, succeeding Gary Sobers, giving the team more determination and resolve. After Kanhai's retirement, the West Indies called on him to be their first national cricket coach. In charge of coaching the under-19s before being assigned to the Test team, Kanhai's selection was announced at the WICBoC annual general meeting in May 1992 to start work in the autumn of 1992 "for an as yet unspecified period". He resigned in 1995 in favour of Andy Roberts.

Throughout his first-class cricket career, Kanhai played for British Guiana, Guyana, North of South Africa (SACBOC), Tasmania, Transvaal (SACB) in the Howa Bowl, Trinidad, Warwickshire and Western Australia.

In English county cricket for Warwickshire, he also played alongside Kallicharran, John Jameson and Dennis Amiss. Kanhai scored 11,615 first-class runs for Warwickshire at an average of 51.62, which is the highest for any batsman who played for the county for a considerable time.

The Indian opening batsman Sunil Gavaskar named his son Rohan after Kanhai, and wrote of Kanhai, "To say that he is the greatest batsman I have ever seen so far is, to put it mildly." Bob Holland, the Australian spin bowler, also named his son Rohan, in honour of Kanhai. There is a Wetherspoons pub in Ashington, Northumberland named after him in recognition of his time playing for Ashington Cricket Club during the 1963/64 season when he was brought in by Charlie Chisholm Senior and helped them win both the cup and the league. As one of the world's best cricketers, his time at the club drew large crowds and his benefit matches included many other first-class players from the West Indies, including Garfield Sobers, Wesley Hall, Lance Gibbs and Seymour Nurse.

In 2009, Kanhai was inducted into the ICC Cricket Hall of Fame.

Preceded by Garfield Sobers	West Indies Test cricket captains 1972/3 – 1973/4	Succeeded by Clive Lloyd
