= Zorol Barthley =

West Indian cricketer

Donald Zorol Barthley (born 10 May 1966 in Antigua, West Indies) is a former West Indies Under 19 cricket Captain and batsman and a former Chief Cricket Operations Officer for the West Indies Cricket Board.

== Career ==
Barthley played cricket for Antigua and Barbuda, the Leeward Islands and the West Indian U-19 cricket team. He captained the West Indies at this youth level. After his playing career he has taken on various cricketing managerial and operational roles, including president of the Antigua Barbuda Cricket Association, vice-president of the Leeward Islands Cricket Association and Chief Cricket Operations Officer at the WICB. He also served as Chairman/CEO of PIC Insurance Co. Ltd. He currently runs his own operations, DizzyB Enterprises Ltd, offering real estate sales and development, international logistics management, group destination tours and sports tourism management

== Personal life ==
He is married to Molvie (Joseph) Barthley. They have three sons Dario, Dajun and Dajari. Dario is a youth footballer who attained selection into the Antigua Under 15 Football team and played in the CFU CONCACAF Caribbean Youth Cup, 2007.
