= Nari Contractor =

Indian cricketer

Personal information
- Full name: Nariman Jamshedji Contractor
- Born: 7 March 1934 (age 92); Godhra, Bombay Presidency, British India
- Batting: Left-handed
- Bowling: Right-arm medium

International information
- National side: India
- Test debut (cap 77): 2 December 1955 v New Zealand
- Last Test: 7 March 1962 v West Indies

Career statistics
Competition	Test	First-class
Matches	31	138
Runs scored	1,611	8,611
Batting average	31.58	39.86
100s/50s	1/11	22/40
Top score	108	176
Balls bowled	186	2,026
Wickets	1	26
Bowling average	80.00	40.00
5 wickets in innings	0	0
10 wickets in match	0	0
Best bowling	1/9	4/85
Catches/stumpings	18/–	72/–
- Source: ESPNcricinfo, 10 January 2013

Nariman Jamshedji "Nari" Contractor (born 7 March 1934) is a former Indian cricketer, who was a left-handed opening batsman. Contractor made his debut in 1955. A serious injury cut short his Test career in 1962, but he played first class cricket until 1971. He was the youngest Indian captain at the age of 26. In 2007, he received the C. K. Nayudu Lifetime Achievement Award, the highest honour Indian board can bestow on a former player.

== Cricket career ==
Contractor began his first-class career, playing for the Gujarat. The captain of Gujarat Phiroz Khambata saw how Nari played in the selection trial matches for MCA's Silver Jubilee matches in 1955. He did well in the trials and expected to be selected for the matches against Pakistan Services & Bhawalpur Cricket Association. He got to the team because Captain Kambatha had dropped out. Contractor scored hundreds in both innings of his debut, becoming the second man after Arthur Morris to do so.

Later he was chosen to play for India. Nari became an opener after one of the players Vinoo Mankad couldn't take part in a Test match against New Zealand at Delhi in 1955. Later he became an Indian captain.

At Lord's in 1959, he broke two ribs in the first innings by Brian Statham, despite which he scored 81. Later in the year, his 74 in the second innings at Kanpur was crucial in India winning its first Test against Australia. This innings ended when he pulled Alan Davidson, who was bowling left-arm spin at the time. Neil Harvey at short leg ducked and turned, but the ball got stuck between his legs.

== Injury and consequences ==
Contractor led India to a series win against England in 1961–62 and captained the side to the Caribbean the same season. After two Tests, the Indian team traveled to Barbados. There, in a tour match against Barbados at the Kensington Oval in Bridgetown, in March 1962, he was 2 not out while opening the batting with Dilip Sardesai during his side's first innings, when facing Charlie Griffith for the fourth ball of the second over, he saw somebody open a window in the pavilion and consequently was unable to concentrate on the ball following its delivery by Griffith, seeing the ball "just inches away before it hit" him. Contractor took a blow at the back of his skull, fracturing it. A blood clot had developed inside his skull and pressing against the brain, paralyzing him from the waist down. Two surgeries were performed to remove the clot, which required blood transfusion. West Indies captain Frank Worrell donated blood alongside Contractor's teammates Chandu Borde, Bapu Nadkarni and Polly Umrigar. Contractor's life was saved but his international career was abruptly ended as a result. Mansoor Ali Khan of Pataudi took over the captaincy from the third test. In an interview, Contractor mentioned as his only regret that he wanted to play just one Test after the injury, but people did not want him to. He resumed his career after recovering from the injury and even captained Gujarat during the 1970-71 Ranji Trophy but never played a Test after his injury in 1962.

During his playing days, Contractor was considered a glamour boy of Indian cricket. In an interview with Simi Garewal in 1999, former Tamil Nadu chief minister Jayalalithaa stated that as a schoolgirl she had a crush on Contractor.

== Present time ==
Nari Contractor belongs to the Parsi community. He now lives in Mumbai where he coaches at the Cricket Club of India Academy. He received the C. K. Nayudu Lifetime Achievement Award in 2007.
