= C. I. Gunasekera =

Sri Lankan cricketer

Personal information
- Full name: Conroy Ievers Gunasekera
- Born: 14 July 1920; Ceylon
- Died: 29 July 2010 (aged 90); Colombo, Sri Lanka
- Batting: Right-handed
- Bowling: Right-arm leg-spin and googly

Career statistics
Competition	First-class
Matches	22
Runs scored	1266
Batting average	37.23
100s/50s	3/4
Top score	212
Balls bowled	2790
Wickets	53
Bowling average	23.64
5 wickets in innings	2
10 wickets in match	2
Best bowling	8/69
Catches/stumpings	15/–
- Source: Cricinfo, 28 March 2020

Conroy Ievers Gunasekera, sometimes spelt Gunasekara (14 July 1920 – 29 July 2010) was a Sri Lankan cricketer who played first-class cricket for Ceylon from 1949 to 1964, in the period before the country gained Test status. He captained Ceylon several times in the early 1960s.

== Life and career ==
Gunasekera was educated at Royal College Colombo where he played in the Royal-Thomian encounter, starting from 1938. He entered Colombo Law College in 1940, but interrupted his legal studies to join the Ceylon Defence Force as a Second Lieutenant during World War II.

He started playing cricket for the Sinhalese Sports Club under the captaincy of Fredrick C. de Saram. Thereafter Gunasekera went on to play for the Ceylon team. He also represented the Commonwealth, scoring a hundred in the match Commonwealth v MCC, when he took part in a partnership of 207 with the Australian all-rounder Keith Miller. He brought up his century with a six, and Miller did the same shortly afterwards. Up until the 1980s he played for the SSC.

His highest first-class score was 212 for Ceylon against Madras in the annual Gopalan Trophy match in 1958–59. He scored 120 and 30 against Pakistan in 1948–49. With his leg-spin he took 8 for 69 and 2 for 78 for a Ceylon team against a strong Pakistan Combined Services team in 1953–54 and 7 for 63 and 3 for 91 for Ceylon against Mysore in 1957–58.

David Sheppard described him as "a great cricketer who would surely have played Test cricket if he had qualified for another country ... a fine, forcing batsman, driving with great power, and a good leg-spin bowler".

Gunasekera joined Walker & Sons Limited as a manager and went on to serve as a director. His uncle was Dr Churchill Gunasekara, who also captained the Ceylon cricket team.
