= Gregory Asgarali =

Trinidadian cricketer (born 1947)

Personal information
- Born: 24 September 1947 (age 79); Trinidad
- Source: Cricinfo, 26 November 2020

Gregory Asgarali (born 24 September 1947) is a Trinidadian cricketer. He played in eight first-class matches for Trinidad and Tobago from 1968 to 1975.

== See also ==
- List of Trinidadian representative cricketers
