= Clive van Ryneveld =

South African cricketer and politician

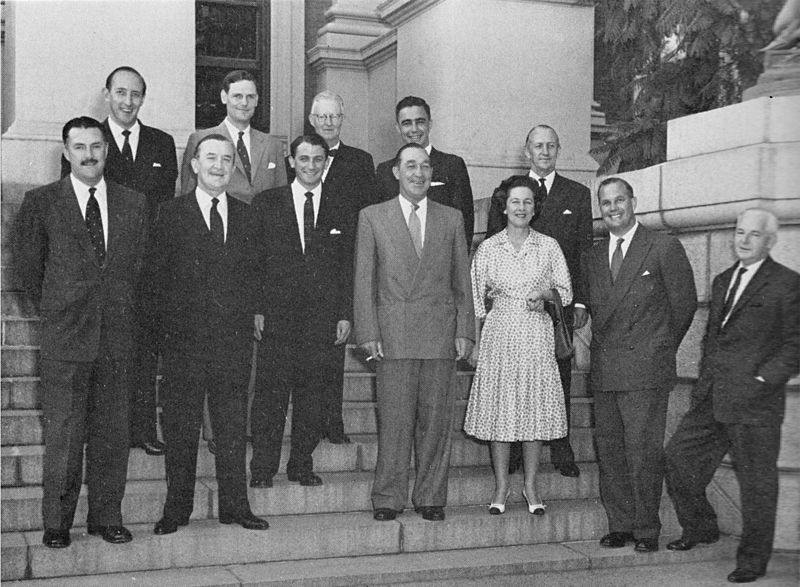
- Parliamentarians of the Progressive Party in 1960. Clive van Ryneveld is in the back row, second from the left.

Personal information
- Full name: Clive Berrangè van Ryneveld
- Born: 19 March 1928; Cape Town, Cape Province, Union of South Africa
- Died: 29 January 2018 (aged 89); Cape Town, Western Cape, South Africa
- Batting: Right-handed
- Bowling: Legbreak googly
- Relatives: Anthony van Ryneveld (brother); Jimmy Blanckenberg (uncle)

International information
- National side: South Africa
- Test debut: 7 June 1951 v England
- Last Test: 28 February 1958 v Australia

Career statistics
| Competition | Test | First-class |
|---|---|---|
| Matches | 19 | 101 |
| Runs scored | 724 | 4,803 |
| Batting average | 26.81 | 30.20 |
| 100s/50s | 0/3 | 4/29 |
| Top score | 83 | 150 |
| Balls bowled | 1,554 | 13,329 |
| Wickets | 17 | 206 |
| Bowling average | 39.47 | 30.24 |
| 5 wickets in innings | 0 | 9 |
| 10 wickets in match | 0 | 0 |
| Best bowling | 4/67 | 8/48 |
| Catches/stumpings | 14/– | 71/– |
- Source: Cricinfo, 8 August 2021

Clive Berrangè van Ryneveld (19 March 1928 – 29 January 2018) was a South African cricketer who played in 19 Test matches between 1951 and 1958. He was the son of Reginald Clive Berrangè van Ryneveld (1891–1969) and Maria Alfreda Blanckenberg (1900–1994). Before his death in 2018, he was the oldest living South African cricket captain.

Van Ryneveld was also an international rugby union player. He represented Oxford University RFC in The Varsity Match in 1947, 1948 and 1949 and won four caps as a centre for the England national rugby union team, playing in all four matches of the 1949 Five Nations Championship. He scored three tries for England; one against Ireland and two against Scotland. He never represented South Africa at rugby union.

According to an obituary by Sport24 he "was one of South Africa's greatest all-round sportsmen who represented and captained South Africa at cricket and represented England at rugby during his time as a Rhodes Scholar at Oxford University (where his older brother Anthony was also a Rhodes Scholar), but he will be remembered equally for the role he played in trying to create a just society for all in South Africa".

E. W. Swanton, the English sports journalist and broadcaster, described Van Ryneveld as "just about the best centre three quarter of my time in English football ... he had speed, balance, jink and body swerve, lovely hands, a remarkably cool brain; and though comparatively light was indomitable in defence."

Van Ryneveld had a brief career in South African politics. In 1957, he was elected to Parliament for East London North as a member of the United Party, then the main opposition to the governing National Party which had introduced apartheid to South Africa. Two years later, in 1959, Van Ryneveld and eleven other MPs broke from the United Party to form the Progressive Party, which adopted a much more aggressive opposition to apartheid. The party's platform was ahead of its time, and in the 1961 general election all of the Progressive MPs except one, Helen Suzman, lost their seats.

Thereafter Van Ryneveld practised law. In his last years, he lived in Cape Town with his wife, Verity Anne Hunter (b. 25 September 1931). Their three children, Mark, Philip and Tessa, live in South Africa.

He published 20th Century All-rounder: Reminiscences and Reflections of Clive van Ryneveld in 2011.

== Death ==
Van Ryneveld died at the age of 89 on 29 January 2018.
