= Gerry Alexander =

Jamaican cricketer

- Alexander at Cambridge in 1952

Personal information
- Full name: Franz Copeland Murray Alexander
- Born: 2 November 1928; Kingston, Colony of Jamaica
- Died: 16 April 2011 (aged 82); Orange Grove, Jamaica
- Batting: Right-handed
- Role: Wicket-keeper

International information
- National side: West Indies (1957–1961)
- Test debut (cap 96): 25 July 1957 v England
- Last Test: 10 February 1961 v Australia

Career statistics
Competition	Tests	First-class
Matches	25	92
Runs scored	961	3238
Batting average	30.03	29.17
100s/50s	1/7	1/21
Top score	108	108
Catches/stumpings	85/5	217/39
- Source: ESPNcricinfo, 19 April 2011

Franz Copeland Murray Alexander OD (2 November 1928 – 16 April 2011), known as Gerry Alexander, was a Jamaican cricketer who played 25 Test matches for the West Indies. He was a wicket-keeper who had 90 dismissals in his 25 Test appearances and, though his batting average was around 30 in both Test and first class cricket, his only first-class century came in a Test on the 1960–61 tour of Australia.

Alexander is generally considered the last white man to captain the West Indies cricket team, although in fact, while fair-skinned, he was mixed race (the cricketer Basil Butcher stated that Alexander's brothers were as dark as he was). He led the West Indies against Pakistan at home in 1958, on the tour of India and Pakistan in 1958–59 and against England in 1960. He would not tolerate the indiscipline of Roy Gilchrist on the tour of India and sent him home before the team reached Pakistan.

== Early life ==
He was educated at Wolmer's Boys' School, which was founded in 1729 and is one of the oldest schools in the West Indies. He then attended Gonville and Caius College, Cambridge. He played for the Cambridge cricket team in both 1952 and 1953, winning a Blue in both years for appearing in the University Match against Oxford. He also won a Blue at football, and went on to win an England amateur cap and an FA Amateur Cup winner's medal in 1953 playing for Pegasus. He played cricket for Cambridgeshire in 1954 and 1955.

He represented Great Britain at football in 1956 in a qualifying game versus Bulgaria on 12 May 1956 at Wembley. The match ended 3–3.

== Test career ==
Having not played a first-class match since 1953, he appeared for Jamaica in two matches against the touring Duke of Norfolk's XI in March 1957. He also appeared in a trial match for the West Indies tour to England that summer, sharing a stand of 134 with Wes Hall. As a result, he was chosen as wicketkeeper for the touring team, though his selection was controversial.

He only appeared in the final two Tests of that series, Rohan Kanhai being preferred as a makeshift keeper for the first three. Alexander distinguished himself in neither match, scoring 0 not out, 11, 0 and 0 and not keeping well, and West Indies lost both matches by an innings.

After the series John Goddard, the captain, retired. For the first time it seemed possible that a black captain would be appointed as his replacement. However Frank Worrell declined the position because he was studying for a degree in economics at Manchester University, and the other senior players Everton Weekes and Clyde Walcott were apparently not considered suitable. Thus Alexander was offered the job and, as his Telegraph obituarist writes "through patience, skill and encouragement... succeeded in forging the array of talent in the West Indies side into a coherent and successful team."

In his first series as captain, in 1958, West Indies won at home by three matches to one against Pakistan. He also performed better both as batsman and keeper, including playing an important innings of 57 in the second innings of the second Test."

West Indies next toured India and Pakistan. For the first time since World War II they had to manage without any of the "three Ws" who had been the core of their batting: Worrell, Weekes and Walcott. Nevertheless, they won three Tests against India and drew the remaining two. On the only occasion that they were in difficulties, against the leg-spin of Subhash Gupte in the second Test, Alexander scored 70 to save the day."

Against North Zone in the last match of the Indian leg of the tour, Roy Gilchrist, who in earlier matches had already shown a tendency to bowl beamers when angry or frustrated, unleashed a barrage of such deliveries against Swaranjit Singh, whom Alexander had known at Cambridge. Gilchrist ignored his captain's instruction to cease this form of attack. During the lunch interval Alexander substituted Gilchrist. Subsequently Gilchrist was sent home, while the other players proceeded to Pakistan for the remainder of the tour. Alexander told Gilchrist: "You will leave by the next flight. Good afternoon." This was the end of Gilchrist's Test career. There were suggestions that he had pulled a knife on Alexander.

West Indies lost their first two Tests against Pakistan but won the third, Pakistan's first home defeat.

The following winter, West Indies lost by one Test to nil against England, with four matches drawn, under Alexander's captaincy. He had the consolation of finishing the series with 23 victims as wicketkeeper, equalling John Waite's world record. The West Indies lost heavily in the second Test in Trinidad, and the crowd rioted when they collapsed in their first innings. As a white man and a Jamaican, Alexander was an unpopular figure with the Trinidad crowd.

Frank Worrell's return to the West Indies team for that series encouraged CLR James, the editor of The Nation, to campaign for him to replace Alexander as captain, and Worrell was chosen to lead the tour to Australia the following winter. Alexander took the decision well, and was supportive of Worrell, who was a close friend. According to his obituarist: "The dismissed captain had taken over a side in total disarray and laid the foundations for future triumphs."

He had a remarkably successful tour of Australia with the bat, scoring 60, 5, 5, 72, 0, 108, 63, 87 not out, 11 and 73 in the Tests. His century at Sydney was an important factor in enabling West Indies to win, and was the only one of his first-class career. He also kept wicket well. At the end of the tour he retired from cricket.

== Later life ==
After retiring as a cricketer he returned to the West Indies, where he pursued a career as a veterinary surgeon. He eventually became Chief Veterinary Officer.

In 1982 Jamaica awarded him the Order of Distinction for his contribution to sport. He died on 16 April 2011 at the age of 82 in Orange Grove, Jamaica. His wife Barbara had died only four weeks previously; they had two children.

Preceded by John Goddard	West Indies Test cricket captains 1957/58–1959/60	Succeeded by Frank Worrell
