= Vernon Prins =

Sri Lankan cricketer

Personal information
- Full name: Vernon George Prins
- Born: 14 April 1924; Ceylon
- Died: 31 July 2003 (aged 79); Nawaloka, Colombo, Sri Lanka
- Batting: Right-handed
- Bowling: Right-arm off-spin

Career statistics
Competition	FC
Matches	14
Runs scored	379
Batting average	18.04
100s/50s	0/1
Top score	74
Balls bowled	1268
Wickets	27
Bowling average	19.92
5 wickets in innings	2
10 wickets in match	0
Best bowling	6/85
Catches/stumpings	13/–
- Source: Cricinfo, 27 March 2015

Vernon George Prins (14 April 1924 – 31 July 2003) was a Sri Lankan cricketer who captained the Ceylon team in first-class matches from 1955–56 to 1959–60.

== School and club career ==
Prins attended S. Thomas' College, Mount Lavinia, where he played for the First XI for several years, captaining the team in 1942–43. He captained Nondescripts Cricket Club in the P Saravanamuttu Trophy from 1952 to 1959, leading them to five premierships, and scoring 5611 runs at an average of 45.25 and taking 322 wickets at 15.60. In 1954-55 Nondescripts played The Rest (that is, Rest of Ceylon) in a three-day match at the Nondescripts ground. Prins took 5 for 11 and 6 for 41 and Nondescripts won by 320 runs.

== Career for Ceylon ==
Prins played for Ceylon from 1944–45 to 1959–60, captaining the national team from 1955–56 to 1959–60. His best performances came in consecutive matches for the Gopalan Trophy. In 1957–58 he took 5 for 48 and 3 for 52, and in 1958–59 he took 6 for 85 and 2 for 44. He also made his highest first-class score in the Gopalan Trophy, 74 in 1953–54.

Prins worked as a police inspector. He also represented Ceylon at hockey.
