= Frank Worrell =

West Indian cricketer (1924–1967)

The Honourable Sir Frank Worrell
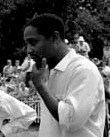

Personal information
- Full name: Frank Mortimer Maglinne Worrell
- Born: 1 August 1924; Bridgetown, Saint Michael, Colony of Barbados
- Died: 13 March 1967 (aged 42); Kingston, Jamaica
- Nickname: Tae, Flanny
- Batting: Right-handed
- Bowling: Slow left arm orthodox Left arm medium
- Relatives: Larry Worrell (cousin)

International information
- National side: West Indies (1948–1963)
- Test debut (cap 61): 11 February 1948 v England
- Last Test: 26 August 1963 v England

Domestic team information
- Years: Team
- 1941–1947: Barbados
- 1947–1964: Jamaica

Career statistics
Competition	Test	First-class
Matches	51	208
Runs scored	3,860	15,025
Batting average	49.48	54.24
100s/50s	9/22	39/80
Top score	261	308*
Balls bowled	7,141	26,979
Wickets	69	349
Bowling average	38.72	28.98
5 wickets in innings	2	13
10 wickets in match	0	0
Best bowling	7/70	7/70
Catches/stumpings	43/–	139/–
- Source: CricketArchive, 8 January 2009

Sir Frank Mortimer Maglinne Worrell (1 August 1924 – 13 March 1967), sometimes referred to by his nickname of "Tae", was a Barbadian West Indies cricketer and Jamaican senator. A stylish right-handed batsman and useful left-arm seam bowler, he became famous in the 1950s as the first black captain of the West Indies cricket team. Along with Everton Weekes and Clyde Walcott, he formed what was known as "The Three Ws" of the West Indian cricket. He was the first batter to have been involved in two 500-run partnerships and remained the only one until Ravindra Jadeja emulated him in the 2010s.

The Frank Worrell Trophy is awarded to the winner of the frequent Test series between Australia and West Indies

He spent some time studying economics and playing in England. A memorial service was held in his honour in Westminster Abbey, the first such honour for a sportsman.

In 2009, Worrell was inducted into the ICC Cricket Hall of Fame. He is widely regarded as the Nelson Mandela of cricket.

== Career ==
Frank Worrell was born in Barbados, within a mile of its Test ground. He played first class cricket for Barbados when he first came to prominence. By 1947, his mother had moved to New York City, and his father was away at sea most of the time, and Worrell moved to Jamaica. Thereafter he played cricket for Jamaica.

As a player for West Indies, Worrell made his debut in 1947–48 versus the England team of Gubby Allen. Following this series he settled in England to play for Radcliffe, Lancashire, in the Central Lancashire League and to read economics at Manchester University. He made his highest Test score of 261 against England at Trent Bridge in 1950, and was a Wisden Cricketer of the Year for 1951.

Following a successful campaign led by C. L. R. James, who was then the editor of The Nation in Trinidad, the period of white Test captaincy in the West Indies came to an end. Worrell became the first black cricketer to captain the West Indies cricket team for an entire series, thus breaking the colour barriers then found in West Indian cricket. He led the side on two particularly notable tours. The first was to Australia in 1960–61. Both Worrell and his opposing captain, Richie Benaud, encouraged their teams to play attacking cricket. The first Test of the series ended in a dramatic tie. Though West Indies lost the series 2–1, with one draw in addition to the tie, they took much credit for contributing to the series. Such was their performance and conduct on Australian soil that they were given a large ticker-tape parade in Australia at the end of their tour.

On 3 February 1962, Nari Contractor, the captain of the touring Indian team, received a career-ending head injury from a bouncer bowled by West Indies fast bowler Charlie Griffith. Worrell was the first player from both sides to donate blood to the injured Contractor, which saved his life.

In 1963, West Indies toured England. They were again popular, and this time they also won the series 3–1, and it was West Indies' second series victory in England after their 3–1 win in 1950.

== Personal life and death ==
Worrell retired after the West Indies–England series. When he left professional cricket, he became Warden of Irvine Hall at the University of the West Indies, and was appointed to the Jamaican Senate by Sir Alexander Bustamante. He strongly supported a closer political union between the nations of the Caribbean. He was knighted by Elizabeth II for his services to cricket as part of Her Majesty's 1964 New Year Honours.

Worrell was a Freemason, belonging to Sussex Lodge No. 354, Kingston, from 1954 until his death, attaining the rank of Master Mason.

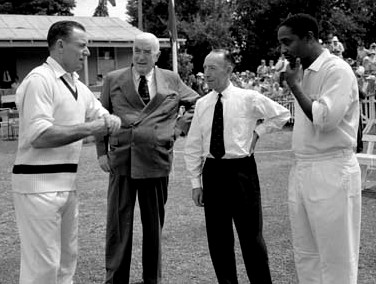
Left to right: Ray Lindwall, Australian Prime Minister Robert Menzies, Lindsay Hassett, Frank Worrell

Worrell managed the West Indies during the 1964–65 visit by Australia. He accompanied the team to India in the winter of 1966–67.

Worrell was the first West Indian to carry his bat in a Test innings.

Whilst in India, he was diagnosed with leukaemia. He died aged 42, a month after returning to Jamaica. A memorial service was held in his honour in Westminster Abbey, the first such honour for a sportsman, the next being for Bobby Moore in 1993.

== Legacy ==
=== Trophy ===
Since the 1960–61 series, the Frank Worrell Trophy is awarded to the winner of the Test series between Australia and West Indies.

=== Ground ===
The Sir Frank Worrell Memorial Ground, also or formerly known as University of West Indies Ground, is a cricket stadium in Saint Augustine, Trinidad and Tobago. The Sir Frank Worrell Cricket Ground at the university's Mona Campus in Jamaica in also named for Worrell.

=== Banknote ===
In March 2002, "to commemorate the 30th anniversary of the Central Bank of Barbados", a limited-edition $5 banknote bearing Worrell's likeness was issued.

=== Stamp ===
In 1988, he was celebrated on the $2 Barbadian stamp alongside the Barbados Cricket Buckle.

=== University halls and lecture ===
The annual Sir Frank Worrell Memorial Lecture was instituted at University of the West Indies (UWI) Cave Hill Campus, Barbados, by Professor Hilary Beckles. The inaugural lecture, "Sir Frank and the rise of West Indies cricket" was delivered by Michael Manley in 1994. Nearby one of the Halls of Residence is named after him.

=== Memorial Committee ===
In 2007, the Sir Frank Worrell Memorial Committee was founded to mark the 40th anniversary of his death (which coincided with the opening match – West Indies vs. Pakistan, Sabina Park, Jamaica, of the ICC Cricket World Cup hosted across the islands).

=== Blood donation drives ===
In 2009, the Sir Frank Worrell Memorial Blood Drive was begun in Trinidad and Tobago, inaugurated by the 74-year-old Nari Contractor, to whom Worrell had donated blood after his head injury in 1962. In remembrance of this, the Cricket Association of Bengal organises a blood donation drive on this day every year, and the day is commemorated as Sir Frank Worrell Day in the state of West Bengal in India.

=== Food outlet branding ===
Tibb's Frankie, since 1969, is an Indian-centred chain of over 150 stuffed, crispened pita outlets named after him as the founder's favourite cricketer; its signature and custom wraps are "Frankies". An outlet operates in the O2 Business Tower in Dubai.

=== Films and entertainment ===
He also made a special guest appearance in the 1967 Bollywood film Around the World. He had a small role with actor Om Prakash and Mehmood.

=== Biographies ===
Ivo Tennant, Simon Lister and Vaneisa Baksh have published biographies of Worrell.

== See also ==
- Development of the Test captaincy of West Indies

== Footnotes and citations ==
Preceded by Gerry Alexander	West Indies Test cricket captains 1960/1 - 1963	Succeeded by Garfield Sobers
