= Indian cricket team in New Zealand in 1967–68 =

International cricket tour

	India	New Zealand
- Dates: 15 February – 12 March 1968
Captains	Mansoor Ali Khan Pataudi	Barry Sinclair (1st Test); Graham Dowling

Test series
- Result: India won the 4-match series 3–1
Most runs	Ajit Wadekar (328)	Graham Dowling (471)
Most wickets	EAS Prasanna (24)	Dick Motz (15)

The India national cricket team toured New Zealand from 15 February to 12 March 1968 and played a four-match Test series against New Zealand. India won the series 3–1. India won the first Test, and New Zealand drew level by winning the second. India claimed the series by winning the last two Tests.

== Squads ==
New Zealand	India
Barry Sinclair (c, 1st Test)	Mansoor Ali Khan Pataudi (c)
Graham Dowling (c, other Tests)	Farokh Engineer (wk)
Bruce Murray	Ajit Wadekar
Bevan Congdon	Rusi Surti
Vic Pollard	E. A. S. Prasanna
Mark Burgess	Syed Abid Ali
Bryan Yuile	M. L. Jaisimha
Bruce Taylor	Chandu Borde
Dick Motz	Bapu Nadkarni
Jack Alabaster	Ramakant Desai
Roy Harford (wk)	Bishan Singh Bedi
Keith Thomson	Umesh Kulkarni
Gary Bartlett	Venkataraman Subramanya
John Ward (wk)	Kumar Indrajitsinhji (wk)
	Dilip Sardesai
	Ramesh Saxena

Indrajitsinhji, Sardesai and Saxena did not appear in any of the four Test matches.

== Tour matches ==
=== Three-day: New Zealand Cricket Council President's XI v Indians ===
5–7 February
Scorecard

New Zealand Cricket Council President's XI	v	Indians
202 (91.5 overs); Mark Burgess 42; EAS Prasanna 4/70 (29 overs)		105 (49.3 overs); Ramesh Saxena 21; Neville Huxford 3/31 (15 overs)
232/6d (73 overs); Keith Thomson 78; Bishan Singh Bedi 2/45 (16 overs)		264/7 (109 overs); Rusi Surti 88; Martin Horton 2/45 (26 overs)

Match drawn
Seddon Park, Hamilton, New Zealand
Umpires: Dennis Copps and Trevor Martin

=== Three-day: Central Districts v Indians ===
9–12 February
Scorecard

Central Districts	v	Indians
185 (84.1 overs); Bryan Yuile 55; Syed Abid Ali 4/47 (33 overs)		363 (99.3 overs); Ajit Wadekar 122; Lindsay Sparks 4/63 (24.3 overs)
146 (60.3 overs); Maurice Ryan 42; Bapu Nadkarni 3/13 (12 overs)

India won by an innings and 32 runs
Pukekura Park, New Plymouth, New Zealand
Umpires: Ross Allen and Dick Shortt

- 11 February was a rest day.

== Test matches ==
=== 1st Test ===
15–20 February
Scorecard

New Zealand	v	India
350 (157.3 overs); Graham Dowling 143; Syed Abid Ali 4/26 (15 overs)		359 (124 overs); Ajit Wadekar 80; Dick Motz 5/86 (34 overs)
208 (104 overs); Bruce Murray 54; EAS Prasanna 6/94 (40 overs)		200/5 (74.4 overs); Ajit Wadekar 71; Jack Alabaster 3/48 (22 overs)

India won by 5 wickets
Carisbrook, Dunedin, New Zealand
Umpires: Dennis Copps (NZ) and Trevor Martin (NZ)

- 18 February was a rest day.
- Test debut for Mark Burgess, Roy Harford and Bruce Murray (NZ)
- This was India's first Test win away from home.

=== 2nd Test ===
22–27 February
Scorecard

New Zealand	v	India
502 (186.3 overs); Graham Dowling 239 (519); Bishan Singh Bedi 6/127 (47.3 overs)		288 (92.2 overs); Rusi Surti 67; Dick Motz 6/63 (21 overs)
88/4 (40.4 overs); Bevan Congdon 61; Bishan Singh Bedi 2/21 (17 overs)		301 (98.5 overs) (following on); Farokh Engineer 63; Gary Bartlett 6/38 (16.5 overs)

New Zealand won by 6 wickets
Lancaster Park, Christchurch, New Zealand
Umpires: Fred Goodall (NZ) and Dick Shortt (NZ)

- Keith Thomson (NZ) made his Test debut.
- 25 February was a rest day.
- This was New Zealand's first Test victory over India.
- Dowling's 239 was a record individual Test score for New Zealand, and Bartlett's 6/38 was the best New Zealand Test bowling figures.

=== 3rd Test ===
29 February – 5 March
Scorecard

New Zealand	v	India
186 (89.2 overs); Mark Burgess 66; EAS Prasanna 5/32 (18.2 overs)		327 (108.1 overs); Ajit Wadekar 143; Richard Collinge 3/65 (18 overs)
199 (81.2 overs); Mark Burgess 60; Bapu Nadkarni 6/43 (30 overs)		59/2 (13.3 overs); Syed Abid Ali 36; Bruce Murray 1/0 (1 over)

India won by 8 wickets
Basin Reserve, Wellington, New Zealand
Umpires: Dennis Copps and Trevor Martin

- 3 March was a rest day.

=== 4th Test ===
7–12 March
Scorecard

India	v	New Zealand
252 (90.4 overs); Mansoor Ali Khan Pataudi 51; Dick Motz 4/51 (26.4 overs)		140 (77.1 overs); Bevan Congdon 27; EAS Prasanna 4/44 (28.1 overs)
261/5d (96 overs); Rusi Surti 99; Bruce Taylor 2/60 (22 overs)		101 (61.4 overs); Graham Dowling 37; EAS Prasanna 4/40 (27 overs)

India won by 272 runs
Eden Park, Auckland, New Zealand
Umpires: Dennis Copps and Trevor Martin

- 10 March was a rest day.
