= New Zealand cricket team in England in 1965 =

International cricket tour

The New Zealand cricket team toured England in the 1965 season, playing three Test matches in the first half of a damp summer. England later hosted a second three-match series against South Africa, the first time two Test series were played in a single English cricket season since the 1912 Triangular Tournament.

The New Zealand side lost all three Test matches, and lost three other first-class matches against English counties. The team's only victories came in one county match and in the first-class matches against Scotland and Ireland.

== Background ==
New Zealand had last toured England in 1958 and the 1965 tour had been scheduled for several seasons. However, the success and popularity of the 1963 West Indies tourists led to demands for an early return visit, so schedules were rearranged and New Zealand and South Africa "doubled up" in 1965, the first time this arrangement, now commonplace, had happened.

Since the last tour of England, there had been five Tests between the two sides in New Zealand, England winning four of them. New Zealand had yet to record a single victory over England after 31 Tests between the teams, England having won 14 matches before this series.

The New Zealand team arrived in England at the end of the most intensive period of Test cricket in the country's history. The side had played three drawn matches at home to Pakistan in January and February 1965, then travelled to India for a four-match Test series which they lost 1-0 with three drawn, and then went to Pakistan for three further Tests, two of which were lost.

The New Zealand team was in a state of transition, with older players such as John Reid and Bert Sutcliffe, who had both first come to England with the 1949 New Zealand side, nearing retirement. At the other end of the scale were several promising batsmen, including Bev Congdon and Barry Sinclair, and young seam bowlers in Richard Collinge and Bruce Taylor. Collinge and Vic Pollard, the Lancashire-born off-spinner, were only 19 at the time of the tour.

England too were in transition, with no obvious fast-bowling candidates coming through to replace veterans Brian Statham and Fred Trueman; and batsmen such as Peter May and Ted Dexter either retired or nearing the ends of their careers.

== The New Zealand team ==
A party of 15 players left New Zealand for the six-months world tour, but that number had increased to 16 by the time the team reached England. John Ward, selected as the only wicketkeeper in the original party – though captain John Reid had kept wicket in a Test match in 1949 – was injured in India and Artie Dick was sent out as a reinforcement. Ward remained with the touring side and played in one Test in England.

The full team was:

- John Reid, captain
- Graham Dowling, vice-captain
- Frank Cameron
- Richard Collinge
- Bev Congdon
- Artie Dick, wicketkeeper
- Terry Jarvis
- Ross Morgan
- Dick Motz
- Vic Pollard
- Barry Sinclair
- Bert Sutcliffe
- Bruce Taylor
- Graham Vivian
- John Ward, wicketkeeper
- Bryan Yuile

By the time the team reached England, all of them had had experience of Test cricket, with Jarvis, Pollard, Taylor and Vivian making their Test debuts in the matches in India and Pakistan. In England, Jarvis and Vivian were the only players not to play in a Test match.

Reid and Sutcliffe were members of the 1949 tour and Reid had captained the 1958 touring team, of which Sutcliffe and Ward were also members. None of the other members of the team had previously toured England. The team was managed by Walter Hadlee, who had captained the 1949 New Zealand team in England.

== Test series summary ==
=== First Test ===
27 May – 1 June 1965
(5-day match)
Scorecard

England	v	New Zealand
435 (156.4 overs); Ken Barrington 137; Dick Motz 5/108 (43 overs)		116 (63 overs); Graham Dowling 32; Fred Titmus 4/18 (26 overs)
96/1 (30.5 overs); Bob Barber 51; Ross Morgan 1/18 (1.5 overs)		413 (f/o) (175.4 overs); Vic Pollard 81*; Bob Barber 4/132 (45 overs)

England won by 9 wickets
Edgbaston, Birmingham
Umpires: Charlie Elliott and Fred Price

- England won the toss and elected to bat.
- 30 May was taken as a rest day.
- Dick Motz (NZ) claimed his first five-wicket haul in Tests.
- Fred Titmus (Eng) picked up his 100th wicket in Tests.

Played in cold weather, the match was essentially decided on the first innings. England batted solidly, with Ted Dexter making 57 and Colin Cowdrey 85, but the largest innings was by Ken Barrington who took 435 minutes to make 137 in what Wisden Cricketers' Almanack termed a "tedious exhibition". Motz took five wickets for 108 runs. New Zealand batted badly against the spin of Fred Titmus, and Sutcliffe had to retire hurt after ducking into a bouncer from Fred Trueman. Following on 319 behind, they batted much more consistently, with seven batsmen reaching 40. However, only Pollard, with an undefeated 81, and the recovered Sutcliffe managed to pass 50. England needed 95 to win and the match was over by lunchtime on the fifth day.

=== Second Test ===
17–22 June 1965
(5-day match)
Scorecard

New Zealand	v	England
175 (74.5 overs); Vic Pollard 55; Fred Rumsey 4/25 (13 overs)		307 (100.2 overs); Colin Cowdrey 119; Richard Collinge 4/85 (28.2 overs)
347 (149 overs); Barry Sinclair 72; Bob Barber 3/57 (28 overs)		218/3 (60.5 overs); Ted Dexter 80*; Dick Motz 3/45 (19 overs)

England won by 7 wickets
Lord's, London
Umpires: Syd Buller and Eddie Phillipson

- New Zealand won the toss and elected to bat.
- 20 June was taken as a rest day.
- John Snow (ENG) made his Test debut.
- Dick Motz (NZ) picked his 50th wicket in Tests.

England left out Barrington because of his dull batting at Edgbaston, and Sutcliffe was not fit for New Zealand. The touring team won the toss and batted and then lost four wickets for 28 runs, all taken by Fred Rumsey at a personal cost of seven runs. Reid and Dick became John Snow's first Test victims on his debut, but Pollard (55) and Taylor (51) added 92 for the seventh wicket. England's reply was built around 119 from Cowdrey and 62 from Dexter, but Collinge finished the innings off with four quick wickets. As at Edgbaston, New Zealand batted much better in their second innings and with 50s from Dowling, Sinclair and Pollard they totalled 347. That left England 216 to win. With 76 for Geoffrey Boycott and an unbeaten 80 from Dexter, the main danger to the win was from the weather, which caused long interruptions on both the final days, England in the end winning with only 15 minutes to spare. The match was Fred Trueman's final Test appearance. His 306th and 307th Test victims were Taylor and Collinge in the first innings.

=== Third Test ===
8–13 July 1965
(5-day match)
Scorecard

England	v	New Zealand
546/4d (151 overs); John Edrich 310*; Bruce Taylor 2/140 (40 overs)		193 (88.1 overs); John Reid 54; Ray Illingworth 4/42 (28 overs)
		166 (f/o) (84 overs); Vic Pollard 53; Fred Titmus 5/19 (26 overs)

England won by an innings and 187 runs
Headingley, Leeds
Umpires: Jack Crapp and Charlie Elliott

- England won the toss and elected to bat.
- 11 July was taken as a rest day.

Injuries to Boycott and Dexter led to the recall of John Edrich and Barrington, and their stand of 369 for the second wicket sealed the match. Edrich hit five sixes and 52 fours in an unbeaten 310, the eighth Test score of more than 300 and the third on the Leeds ground after Bradman's 334 and 304 in 1930 and 1934. Barrington made 163 in just over six hours, and England's total was at that stage their highest against New Zealand. New Zealand lost four wickets for 61, but Reid made 54, Pollard 33 and Yuile 46. Even so, New Zealand followed on 353 behind and another patchy batting performance – again Pollard, who hit 53, was an exception – led to a big defeat. The match was all but finished by Titmus taking four wickets in an over, Yuile, Taylor, Motz and Collinge falling respectively to the first, third, fourth and sixth balls. Titmus finished with five wickets for 19 runs off 26 overs. John Edrich opened for England and was not out at the declaration; and New Zealand followed on in an unsuccessful effort to require England to bat again. Edrich was thus on the field for every ball of the game.

== First-class matches ==
Apart from the Tests, the New Zealanders played 16 other first-class matches, and two one-day warm-up matches. They won three of the first-class games and lost three, though their victories included the matches against Scotland and Ireland, both at that time weaker than the county teams the tourists met.

=== Before the first Test ===
After the two warm-up one-day matches against London New Zealand (including Jim Laker) and the Duke of Norfolk's Team, the New Zealanders played a tight game with the County Champions Worcestershire which was distinguished by a 10th wicket partnership of 107 by Motz, who made 95 and Cameron, the highest last-wicket partnership for a New Zealand team in England.

The match that followed against Lancashire lost the whole of the first day to rain, and proved pretty much of a disaster. Put into bat, Lancashire reached 225 thanks to Geoff Pullar, and Vivian hurt his ankle, which meant he was unable to bat. New Zealand totalled 115 without him and, under the then rules for a match reduced to two days, followed on. In the second innings, Brian Statham and Ken Higgs reduced the tourists to 8 for six wickets (with Vivian unable to bat). Pollard and Motz ensured respectability by taking the score to 104, but the match was lost by an innings and six runs.

Off the back of this heavy defeat, the New Zealanders produced one of their better performances, coming from a first-innings deficit to beat Gloucestershire by four wickets. Motz, who took five wickets in the county's second innings, settled the match by hitting three sixes off the England off-spinner John Mortimore.

The traditional match between the tourists and the MCC at Lord's saw the New Zealanders have the best of a drawn game against a side containing 10 present or future Test players. Congdon scored 136 in a first innings total of 318 for seven declared; he also scored an unbeaten 50 in the second innings. Rain interfered with the last day's cricket.

The run-up to the first Test match involved two drawn games. The match with Nottinghamshire was a low-scoring and slow-scoring match, in which the New Zealanders just held on to draw with one wicket left and 38 runs to make. By contrast, Cambridge University posted a first innings of 364 for nine declared, and then forced the New Zealanders to follow on, dismissing the team for just 137. In the follow-on, Sinclair made 130, Dowling 87 and Congdon 63, and the match petered out to a draw.

=== Between the first and second Tests ===
Between the first and second Tests the New Zealanders played four county teams, losing the first match to Yorkshire and drawing the other three with Glamorgan, Surrey and Somerset in succession. Yorkshire's total of 419 was built around a century by Brian Close and the tourists followed-on after being bowled out for 134. In their second innings they totalled 208 to lose by an innings and 77 runs. Motz and Congdon made fifties. The Glamorgan game was affected by rain with only 45 minutes play being possible on the final day. Tony Lewis's century was the main contribution in Glamorgan's innings and Reid declared the New Zealand innings 48 runs in arrears at the start of the last day before rain intervened.

Against Surrey Cameron took five for 73 and the New Zealanders batted strongly, with Morgan scoring 110 and Dick, Sinclair and Taylor making fifties in a total of 422 for nine declared in reply to the home team's 248. John Edrich and Ken Barrington scored hundreds for Surrey who saved the game comfortably. The game before the third Test, at Taunton, was also affected by rain and no play took place on the final day. The New Zealanders were reduced to 15 for five in their first innings before Sinclair and Dick led a recovery to total 155. Somerset in turn were bowled out for 196 with Motz's six for 63 leading the bowling. The New Zealanders batted more easily in the second innings, Dowling making 101 before rain closed the match.

=== Between the second and third Tests ===
The New Zealanders played four further first-class matches between the second and third Tests, drawing with Oxford University and Kent, losing to Warwickshire and drawing with Northamptonshire. The Oxford University game was badly affected by the weather with only the second day seeing a significant amount of play. The tourists scored 285 with Morgan just falling short of a century, Oxford making 137 for three in reply. The New Zealanders had the better of the first innings in the Kent match, declaring on 360 for 8 in reply to the home team's 213 all out in which Cameron's four for 40 was the pick of the bowling. Reid's 165 in under four hours was the mainstay of the New Zealanders' innings but Kent batted well in the second innings to make 285 for six declared and set the tourists 139 to win in 65 minutes, a target which they did not chase, finishing on 17 for three.

At Edgbaston the New Zealanders suffered their third defeat of the tour to a county team as Warwickshire won by nine wickets. The tourists declared on 297 for 9 in their first innings with fifties from Jarvis (84) and Vivian (54*), and reduced to Warwickshire to 64 four in reply. An unbeaten partnership of 255 three hours between John Jameson and Tom Cartwright, who scored 137 and 112 respectively allowed Warwickshire to declare on 319 for four. The New Zealanders were bowled out for 219 in their second innings with Reid playing another aggressive innings of 84. This left the home team a target of 198 in just over two-and-a-half hours, which they accomplished with one wicket down and 12 minutes to spare. Billy Ibadulla (93) and M. J. K. Smith (63) put on an unbroken stand of 132 to see Warwickshire home. The New Zealanders final county match of the tour resulted in a draw at Northampton with New Zealand having the better of the match. Northants declared on 282 for seven after rain cut short the first day, with the tourists reply totalling 370 for nine declared. Dick's 96 in 87 minutes was the highlight of the innings with Congdon and Morgan also reaching their fifties. Northants batted slowly on the final day to save the game, finishing on 188 for nine.

=== After the third Test ===
The New Zealanders concluded their first-class matches with wins over Scotland in Glasgow by nine wickets and Ireland in Belfast by ten wickets. Scotland were dismissed for 115 after being put in with Cameron taking six wickets. Congdon carried his bat for 176 in the tourists' innings and although Scotland batted better in their second innings the New Zealanders made the 71 required with the loss of one wicket. The Ireland game followed a similar pattern with the tourists taking an 86-run lead and scoring the 32 needed for victory without loss, Sutcliffe making 102 on his last innings in a tour of Britain in the first innings. On their journey home the New Zealanders played non first-class matches against Holland, Somers Isles & Bermuda, Bermuda and Southern California - the first three matches were drawn and the Southern California team were beaten by 64 runs.

15–17 July 1965
(3-day match)
Scorecard

Scotland	v	New Zealand
115 (51.3 overs); Nesbitt Gallacher 34; Frank Cameron 6/35 (19.3 overs)		364/6 dec. (95 overs); Bev Congdon 176*; Bill Dow 2/89 (25 overs)
316 (99.1 overs); Jimmy Allan 99*; Dick Motz 4/41 (19 overs)		71/1 (20.4 overs); Graham Vivian 34*; Bill Dow 1/30 (8 overs)

New Zealand won by 9 wickets
Hamilton Crescent, Glasgow
Umpires: DR McCulloch, RJ Ritchie

- New Zealand won the toss and decided to field

19–21 July 1965
(3-day match)
Scorecard

Ireland	v	New Zealand
130 (68.4 overs); Donald Pratt 58; Frank Cameron 5/45 (20 overs)		216 (91.3 overs); Bert Sutcliffe 102; Scott Huey 5/68 (24 overs)
117 (83.3 overs); Stanley Bergin 30; Bruce Taylor 2/6 (7.3 overs)		32/0 (7.1 overs); Ross Morgan 16*

New Zealand won by 10 wickets
Ormeau, Belfast
Umpires: G England, J McAllan

- Ireland won the toss and decided to bat
- Dermott Monteith and Douglas Goodwin made their debuts in first-class matches

24–25 July 1965
(2-day match)
Scorecard

Netherlands	v	New Zealand
139 (61.2 overs); Anton Bakker 53; Dick Motz 4/28 (9 overs)		361 (85.4 overs); John Reid 87; P Maas 5/110 (27.4 overs)
234/8 (84 overs); Anton Bakker 65; Frank Cameron 4/56 (16 overs)

Match drawn
Sportpark Koninklijke HFC, Haarlem
Umpires: WA Mons, G Stallman

- New Zealand won the toss and decided to field
