= New Zealand cricket team in Australia in 1967–68 =

International cricket tour

The New Zealand cricket team toured Australia in the 1967-68 season. They played four first-class matches and three other matches between 17 November and 12 December 1967. It was New Zealand's first dedicated tour to Australia since 1925-26. However, no Test matches were played.

== The team ==
- Barry Sinclair (captain)
- Vic Pollard (vice-captain)
- Jack Alabaster
- Mark Burgess
- Richard Collinge
- Bevan Congdon
- Roy Harford
- Terry Jarvis
- Dick Motz
- Bruce Murray
- Bruce Taylor
- Keith Thomson
- Bryan Yuile

The manager was Joe Ongley. Bob Cunis had to withdraw from the selected team before the tour owing to a knee injury and was replaced by Collinge. Graham Dowling was unavailable.

Burgess, Harford, Murray and Thomson were the only players who had not played Test cricket. All four made their Test debuts in the series against India in New Zealand a few weeks later.

== The tour ==
As three of the team – Murray, Pollard and Yuile – were opposed to Sunday play, the tour schedule was rearranged slightly to avoid Sundays; the Queensland match was reduced from four days to three.

The first match was against South Australia. At the end of the third day, the New Zealanders, needing 188 to win, were 67 for 6, with Dick Motz 12 not out. On the last day Motz hit his way to 94, with 10 fours and six sixes, but the New Zealanders still fell for 163, 25 runs short, Eric Freeman taking 8 for 47.

The second match, against Victoria, was drawn, Mark Burgess scoring 98 not out in the first innings, and Paul Sheahan making 161 for Victoria. In the easy victory over a Victorian Country side that followed, Motz hit 76 in 46 minutes, taking four sixes and three fours from one over.

The next match, against Queensland, was drawn. The New Zealanders were in a strong position when rain washed out play on the last day: after declaring and setting Queensland 353 to win, they had taken two wickets for 44. In the first innings Pollard scored the New Zealanders' only century of the tour, 125 in four hours; Murray made 98.

New South Wales won the last match by 131 runs, led by the speed and swing of David Renneberg and Grahame Corling, who each took eight wickets in the match. Murray, the opening batsman, made 45 and 60.

Murray was the leading run-scorer, with 351 runs at an average of 43.87. Taylor took the most wickets, 13 at 25.00.
