= West Indian cricket team in New Zealand in 1968–69 =

International cricket tour

The West Indies cricket team toured New Zealand in February and March 1969 and played a three-match Test series against the New Zealand national cricket team. The series was drawn 1–1.

== Test series summary ==
=== First Test ===
27 February–3 March 1969
(4–day match)
Scorecard

New Zealand	v	West Indies
323 (73.4 overs); BR Taylor 124; RM Edwards 3/58 (16 overs)		276 (79.7 overs); MC Carew 109; BW Yuile 3/64 (15 overs)
297/8d (112.2 overs); GT Dowling 71; DAJ Holford 3/56 (15 overs)		348/5 (69 overs); SM Nurse 168; V Pollard 1/48 (12 overs)

West Indies won by 5 wickets
Eden Park, Auckland
Umpires: ECA Mackintosh and RWR Shortt

- West Indies won the toss and elected to field.
- 2 March was taken as a rest day.
- BF Hastings, BD Milburn and GM Turner (all NZ) made their Test debuts.

=== Second Test ===
7–11 March 1969
(4–day match)
Scorecard

West Indies	v	New Zealand
297 (65.4 overs); JL Hendriks 54*; RC Motz 6/69 (18 overs)		282 (83.7 overs); GM Turner 74; RM Edwards 5/84 (24.7 overs)
148 (37.4 overs); BF Butcher 59; BW Yuile 3/25 (6.4 overs)		166/4 (48.5 overs); BF Hastings 62*; RM Edwards 2/42 (11 overs)

New Zealand won by 6 wickets
Basin Reserve, Wellington
Umpires: ECA Mackintosh and RWR Shortt

- New Zealand won the toss and elected to field.
- 9 March was taken as a rest day.

=== Third Test ===
13–17 March 1969
(4–day match)
Scorecard

West Indies	v	New Zealand
417 (101.4 overs); SM Nurse 258; RC Motz 5/113 (27 overs)		217 (80.3 overs); BR Taylor 43*; DAJ Holford 4/66 (20 overs)
		367/6 (f/o) (118.4 overs); BF Hastings 117; GS Sobers 3/70 (31 overs)

Match drawn
Lancaster Park, Christchurch
Umpires: ECA Mackintosh and WT Martin

- West Indies won the toss and elected to bat.
- 16 March was taken as a rest day.
