= List of international cricket five-wicket hauls by Derek Underwood =

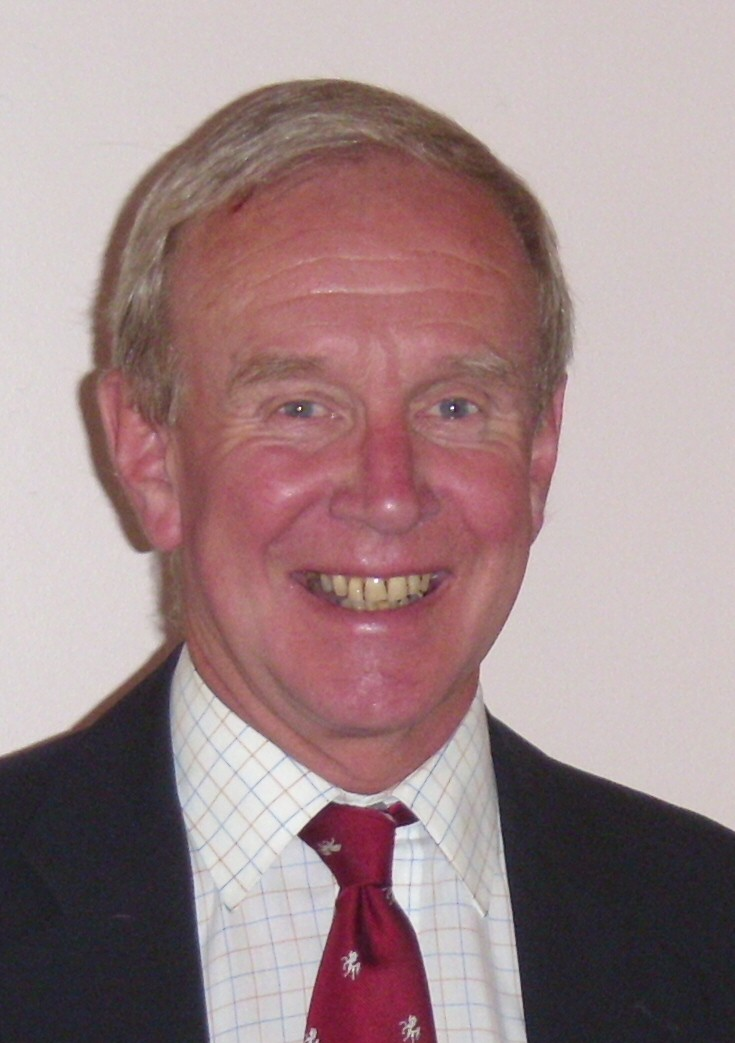
Underwood took 17 five-wicket hauls in Test cricket.

Derek Underwood, a slow left-arm orthodox bowler, represented the England cricket team in 86 Tests between 1966 and 1982. In cricket, a five-wicket haul (also known as a "five-for" or "fifer") refers to a bowler taking five or more wickets in a single innings. This is regarded as a notable achievement, and as of October 2024, only 54 bowlers have taken 15 or more five-wicket hauls at international level in their cricketing careers. In Test cricket, Underwood took 297 wickets, including 17 five-wicket hauls. The Wisden Cricketers' Almanack named him one of their cricketers of the year in 1969, and in 2009 was one of the 55 inaugural members of the ICC Cricket Hall of Fame.

Underwood made his Test debut during the third Test of the West Indies tour of England in 1966, at Trent Bridge. His first Test five-wicket haul came in the second Test of Pakistan during their 1967 tour at Trent Bridge. Underwood's seventeen five-wicket hauls places him joint-third in a list of most five-wicket hauls by England Test players, behind Ian Botham and Sydney Barnes. By the end of his career, he had claimed five-wicket hauls in both innings of a match on three occasions, twice against New Zealand He went on to take ten or more wickets in a match on six occasions. In Tests, Underwood was most successful against New Zealand, with six five-wicket hauls. His career-best figures for an innings were 8 wickets for 51 runs at Lord's, against Pakistan in 1974. Following up his 5 for 20 in the first innings of that match to achieve his best match figures of 13 for 71.

Underwood made his One Day International (ODI) debut against New Zealand at St. Helen's Rugby and Cricket Ground, Swansea, in 1973. He never took a five-wicket haul in his 26 ODIs; his career-best figures for an innings were 4 wickets for 44 runs against the West Indies during the 1979–80 Australian Tri-Series, a match England won by 2 runs at the Sydney Cricket Ground. As of 2015, Underwood is twenty-ninth overall among all-time combined five-wicket haul takers. (Note: Underwood shares the position with Abdul Qadir and Fred Trueman.)

== Key ==
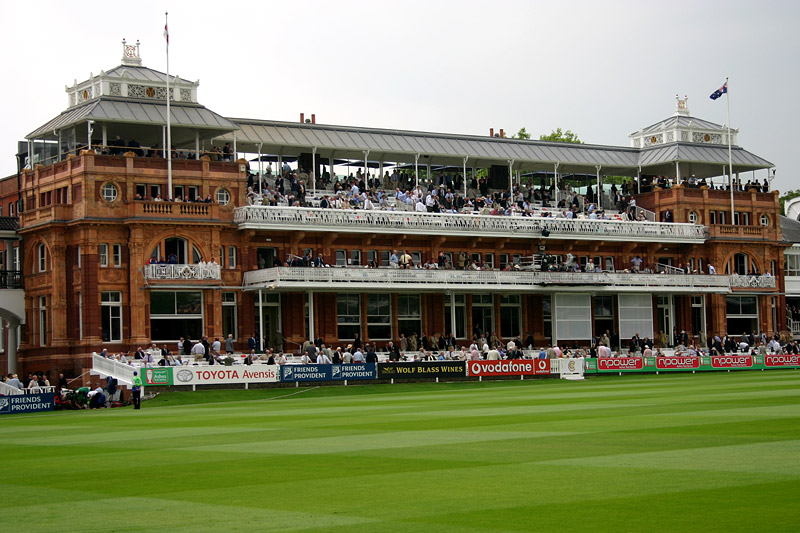
Underwood took four of his five-wicket hauls at Lord's.

Key for the Test five-wicket hauls table
Symbol	Meaning
Date	Date the match was held, or starting date of the match for Test matches
Inn	The innings of the match in which the five-wicket haul was taken
Overs	Number of overs bowled in that innings
Runs	Runs conceded
Wkts	Number of wickets taken
Econ	Bowling economy rate (average runs per over)
Batsmen	The batsmen whose wickets were taken in the five-wicket haul
Result	The result for the England team in that match
†	10 wickets or more taken in the match
‡	Underwood was selected as man of the match
Drawn	The match was drawn

== Test five-wicket hauls ==
Five-wicket hauls in Test cricket by Derek Underwood
No.	Date	Ground	Against	Inn.	Overs	Runs	Wkts	Econ.	Batsmen	Result
1	10 August 1967	Trent Bridge, Nottingham	Pakistan	3	26.0	52	5	2.00	Mushtaq Mohammad; Saeed Ahmed; Majid Khan; Intikhab Alam; Wasim Bari	Won
2	22 August 1968‡	The Oval, London	Australia	4	31.3	50	7	1.58	IR Redpath; IM Chappell; KD Walters; AA Mallett; GD McKenzie; JW Gleeson; RJ Inverarity	Won
3	28 February 1969	Dacca Stadium, Dhaka	Pakistan	3	44.0	94	5	2.13	Salahuddin; Asif Iqbal; Saeed Ahmed; Mushtaq Mohammad; Hanif Mohammad	Drawn
4	24 July 1969 †‡	Lord's Cricket Ground, London	New Zealand	4	31.0	32	7	1.03	BE Congdon; BF Hastings; V Pollard; MG Burgess; BR Taylor; KJ Wadsworth; RC Motz	Won
5	21 August 1969 †‡	The Oval, London	New Zealand	1	26.0	41	6	1.57	BE Congdon; GM Turner; BR Taylor; KJ Wadsworth; RC Motz; RS Cunis	Won
6	21 August 1969 †	The Oval, London	New Zealand	3	38.3	60	6	1.55	BAG Murray; GM Turner; V Pollard; BR Taylor; RS Cunis; RC Motz	Won
7	25 February 1971 †	Lancaster Park, Christchurch	New Zealand	1	11.6 (Note: Eight-ball overs were bowled in this match.)	12	6	0.76	MJF Shrimpton; GT Dowling; GM Turner; KJ Wadsworth; RS Cunis; HJ Howarth	Won
8	25 February 1971 †	Lancaster Park, Christchurch	New Zealand	3	32.3	85	6	1.96	BE Congdon; RW Morgan; MJF Shrimpton; V Pollard; GM Turner; HJ Howarth	Won
9	5 March 1971	Eden Park, Auckland	New Zealand	2	38.0	108	5	2.13	GT Dowling; BE Congdon; RW Morgan; GM Turner; MJF Shrimpton	Drawn
10	27 July 1972 †	Headingley Cricket Ground, Leeds	Australia	3	19.1	45	6	1.66	GS Chappell; KR Stackpole; KD Walters; RW Marsh; RJ Inverarity; DK Lillee	Won
11	8 August 1974 †	Lord's Cricket Ground, London	Pakistan	1	14.0	20	5	1.42	Zaheer Abbas; Mushtaq Mohammad; Asif Iqbal; Intikhab Alam; Wasim Raja	Drawn
12	8 August 1974 †	Lord's Cricket Ground, London	Pakistan	3	34.5	51	8	1.46	Majid Khan; Zaheer Abbas; Wasim Raja; Asif Iqbal; Imran Khan; Intikhab Alam; Sarfraz Nawaz; Wasim Bari	Drawn
13	25 January 1975 †	Adelaide Oval, Adelaide	Australia	1	29.0	113	7	2.92	RB McCosker; IM Chappell; GS Chappell; IR Redpath; RW Marsh; KD Walters; TJ Jenner	Lost
14	17 June 1976	Lord's Cricket Ground, London	West Indies	2	18.4	39	5	2.08	CG Greenidge; MA Holding; CH Lloyd; VA Holder; AME Roberts	Drawn
15	11 February 1977	Wankhede Stadium, Bombay	India	3	33.0	84	5	2.54	SM Gavaskar; AE Gaekwad; BP Patel; SMH Kirmani; KD Ghavri	Drawn
16	7 July 1977	Old Trafford, Manchester	Australia	3	32.5	66	6	2.01	CS Serjeant; RW Marsh; RJ Bright; GS Chappell; MHN Walker; JR Thomson	Won
17	17 February 1982	Paikiasothy Saravanamuttu Stadium, Colombo	Sri Lanka	1	18.0	28	5	1.55	A Ranatunga; DS de Silva; ALF de Mel; LWS Kaluperuma; RS Madugalle	Won
