= Pakistani cricket team in New Zealand in 1964–65 =

International cricket tour

The Pakistan national cricket team toured New Zealand from December 1964 to February 1965 and played a three-match Test series against the New Zealand team. All three Tests were drawn.

Pakistan also played first-class matches against all six Plunket Shield teams, two non-first-class matches against minor provincial teams, and a first-class match against a President's XI. Of these matches Pakistan won four and drew five, so they went through the tour undefeated.

== Test series summary ==
=== First Test ===
22–26 January 1965
(4-day match)
Scorecard

New Zealand	v	Pakistan
266 (114.2 overs); JR Reid 97; Asif Iqbal 5/48 (25 overs)		187 (95 overs); Abdul Kadir 46; RC Motz 4/45 (20 overs)
179/7d (80.4 overs); SN McGregor 37*; Arif Butt 3/62 (29 overs)		140/7 (52 overs); Asif Iqbal 52*; RC Motz 3/34 (15 overs)

Match drawn
Basin Reserve, Wellington
Umpires: DEA Copps and WT Martin

- Pakistan won the toss and elected to field.
- 24 January was taken as a rest day.
- RO Collinge and BE Congdon (both NZL), and Naushad Ali (PAK) made their Test debuts.

=== Second Test ===
29 January–2 February 1965
(4-day match)
Scorecard

Pakistan	v	New Zealand
226 (154 overs); Javed Burki 63; FJ Cameron 4/36 (26 overs)		214 (98.4 overs); RW Morgan 66; Asif Iqbal 5/52 (27 overs)
207 (100.1 overs); Abdul Kadir 58; FJ Cameron 5/34 (23 overs)		166/7 (80 overs); GT Dowling 62; Pervez Sajjad 5/42 (25 overs)

Match drawn
Eden Park, Auckland
Umpires: ECA Mackintosh and RWR Shortt

- Pakistan won the toss and elected to bat.
- 31 January was taken as a rest day.
- RW Morgan (NZL) made his Test debut.

=== Third Test ===
12–16 February 1965
(4-day match)
Scorecard

Pakistan	v	New Zealand
206 (83 overs); Mohammad Ilyas 88; RC Motz 3/48 (18 overs); BW Yuile 3/48 (11 overs)		202 (98.5 overs); BW Sinclair 46; Asif Iqbal 4/46 (25.5 overs)
309/8d (93.3 overs); Hanif Mohammad 100*; RO Collinge 3/50 (17 overs)		223/5 (83 overs); RW Morgan 97; Asif Iqbal 2/29 (16 overs)

Match drawn
Lancaster Park, Christchurch
Umpires: FR Goodall and WT Martin

- Pakistan won the toss and elected to bat.
- 14 February was taken as a rest day.
- PB Truscott (NZL), and Mufasir-ul-Haq (PAK) made their Test debuts.

== Leading players ==
In the low-scoring series only one player, John Reid, reached 200 runs: he made 229 at an average of 38.16. Hanif Mohammad was Pakistan's highest scorer, with 194 runs at 38.80, and he made the only century, 100 not out in the Third Test. Six bowlers took 10 wickets or more, all of them at an average below 23. Asif Iqbal took the most, 18 at 13.77; Richard Collinge with 15 at 17.66, in his first series, was New Zealand's most successful bowler.

== Bibliography ==
- Don Neely & Richard Payne, Men in White: The History of New Zealand International Cricket, 1894–1985, Moa, Auckland, 1986, pp. 335–38
- R. T. Brittenden, "Pakistan in Australia and New Zealand, 1964-65", Wisden 1966, pp. 832–44
