= English cricket team in New Zealand in 1965–66 =

International cricket tour

The England national cricket team toured New Zealand in February and March 1966 and played a three-match Test series against the New Zealand national cricket team. All three matches were drawn.

== Test series summary ==
=== First Test ===
25 February–1 March 1966
(4-day match)
Scorecard

England	v	New Zealand
342 (127.2 overs); DA Allen 88; GA Bartlett 3/63 (33.2 overs)		347 (143.4 overs); BE Congdon 104; IJ Jones 4/71 (28.4 overs)
201/5d (67 overs); MJK Smith 87; RC Motz 1/38 (20 overs)		48/8 (48 overs); RS Cunis 16*; K Higgs 4/5 (9 overs)

Match drawn
Lancaster Park, Christchurch
Umpires: FR Goodall and WT Martin

- England won the toss and elected to bat.
- 27 February was taken as a rest day.
- GP Bilby and N Puna (both NZL) made their Test debuts.

=== Second Test ===
4–8 March 1966
(4-day match)
Scorecard

New Zealand	v	England
192 (105.4 overs); RC Motz 57; K Higgs 3/29 (20 overs)		254/8d (104 overs); MC Cowdrey 89*; N Puna 2/40 (14 overs)
147/9 (82 overs); BW Sinclair 39; DA Allen 4/46 (33 overs)

Match drawn
Carisbrook, Dunedin
Umpires: WJC Gwynne and WT Martin

- New Zealand won the toss and elected to bat.
- 6 March was taken as a rest day.

=== Third Test ===
11–15 March 1966
(4-day match)
Scorecard

New Zealand	v	England
296 (132.5 overs); BW Sinclair 114; DA Allen 5/123 (47.5 overs)		222 (88.5 overs); MC Cowdrey 59; V Pollard 3/3 (5 overs)
129 (102.4 overs); RW Morgan 25; V Pollard 25; K Higgs 3/27 (28 overs)		159/4 (75 overs); JM Parks 45*; BR Taylor 2/20 (12 overs)

Match drawn
Eden Park, Auckland
Umpires: WT Martin and RWR Shortt

- New Zealand won the toss and elected to bat.
- 13 March was taken as a rest day.
