= English cricket team in New Zealand in 1962–63 =

International cricket tour

The England national cricket team toured New Zealand in February and March 1963, after their tour of Australia, playing a three-match Test series against the New Zealand national cricket team. England won the series 3–0.

== Test series summary ==
=== First Test ===
23–27 February 1963
(4-day match)
Scorecard

England	v	New Zealand
562/7d (186 overs); PH Parfitt 131*; FJ Cameron 4/118 (43 overs)		258 (110.4 overs); BW Yuile 64; JDF Larter 3/51 (26 overs)
		89 (f/o) (53.1 overs); JR Reid 21*; JDF Larter 4/26 (14.1 overs)

England won by an innings and 215 runs
Eden Park, Auckland
Umpires: JMA Brown and RWR Shortt

- England won the toss and elected to bat.
- 24 February was taken as a rest day.
- BW Sinclair and BW Yuile (both NZL) made their Test debuts.

=== Second Test ===
1–4 March 1963
(4-day match)
Scorecard

New Zealand	v	England
194 (76.3 overs); RW Blair 64*; FS Trueman 4/46 (20 overs)		428/8d (149 overs); MC Cowdrey 128*; RW Blair 2/81 (33 overs)
187 (98 overs); WR Playle 65; FJ Titmus 4/50 (31 overs)

England won by an innings and 47 runs
Basin Reserve, Wellington
Umpires: DP Dumbleton and WT Martin

- England won the toss and elected to field.
- 3 March was taken as a rest day.
- The match was scheduled for four days but completed in three.

=== Third Test ===
15–19 March 1963
(4-day match)
Scorecard

New Zealand	v	England
266 (118.2 overs); JR Reid 74; FS Trueman 7/75 (30.2 overs)		253 (95.5 overs); KF Barrington 47; RC Motz 3/68 (19.5 overs)
159 (83.4 overs); JR Reid 100; FJ Titmus 4/46 (21 overs)		173/3 (59.3 overs); KF Barrington 45; JC Alabaster 2/57 (15.3 overs)

England won by 7 wickets
Lancaster Park, Christchurch
Umpires: LC Johnston and WT Martin

- New Zealand won the toss and elected to bat.
- 17 March was taken as a rest day.
