= English cricket team in New Zealand in 1970–71 =

International cricket tour

The England national cricket team toured New Zealand in February and March 1971 and played a two-match Test series against the New Zealand national cricket team. England won the series 1–0 with one match drawn.

== Test series summary ==
=== First Test ===
25 February–1 March 1971
(4-day match)
Scorecard

New Zealand	v	England
65 (37.6 overs); V Pollard 18 (35); DL Underwood 6/12 (11.6 overs)		231 (67.5 overs); BL D’Oliviera 100 (216); HJ Howarth 4/46 (19 overs)
254 (97.3 overs); GM Turner 76 (315); DL Underwood 6/85 (32.3 overs)		89/2 (25 overs); JH Hampshire 51* (69); RO Collinge 2/20 (7 overs)

England won by 8 wickets
Lancaster Park, Christchurch
Umpires: CS Elliott (ENG) and WT Martin (NZ)

- New Zealand won the toss and elected to bat.
- 28 February was taken as a rest day.
- RW Taylor (ENG) made his Test debut.

=== Second Test ===
5–8 March 1971
(4-day match)
Scorecard

England	v	New Zealand
321 (72.6 overs); APE Knott 101 (149); RS Cunis 6/76 (24 overs)		313/7d (106 overs); MG Burgess 104 (176); DL Underwood 5/108 (38 overs)
237 (84.7 overs); APE Knott 95 (251); RO Collinge 4/41 (19 overs)		40/0 (16 overs); GT Dowling 31* (60)

Match drawn
Eden Park, Auckland
Umpires: ECA Mackintosh (NZ) and RWR Shortt (NZ)

- New Zealand won the toss and elected to field.
- MG Webb (NZ) made his Test debut.
