= List of New Zealand Test wicket-keepers =

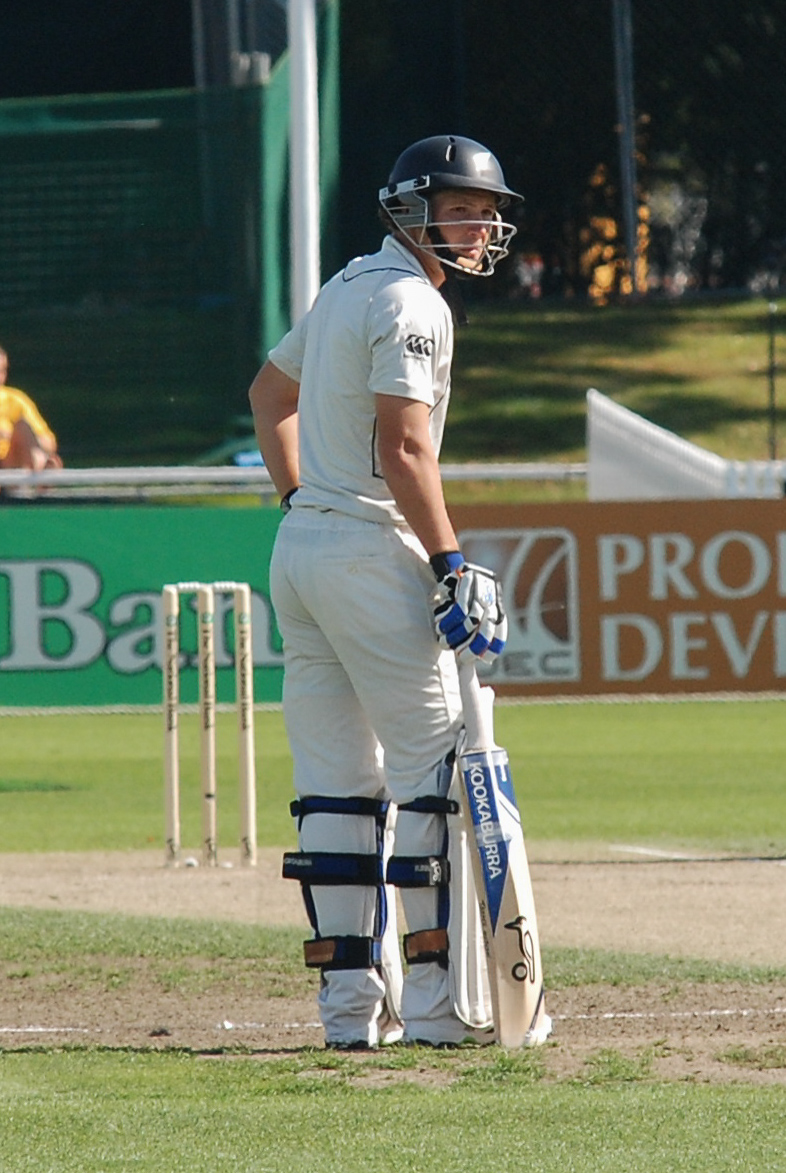
BJ Watling holds the record for most dismissals by a New Zealand wicket-keeper in Test cricket

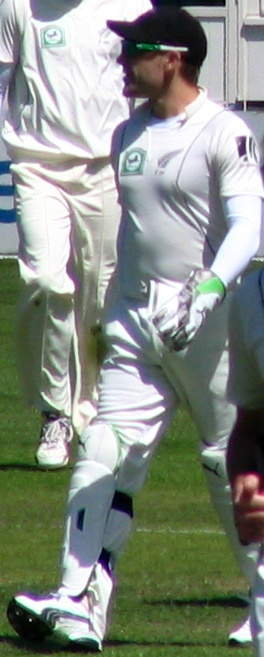
Brendon McCullum made 178 dismissals for New Zealand

This is a chronological list of New Zealand Test wicket-keepers.

No.	Player	Span	Tests	Catches	Stumpings	Total dismissals
1	Ken James	1930–1933	11	11	5	16
2	Eric Tindill	1937–1947	5	6	1	7
3	Frank Mooney	1949–1954	14	22	8	30
4	John Reid	1949	1	2	0	2
5	Ian Colquhoun	1955	2	4	0	4
6	Trevor McMahon	1955–1956	5	7	1	8
7	Eric Petrie	1955–1966	14	25	0	25
8	Sammy Guillen	1956	3	4	1	5
9	Artie Dick	1961–1965	17	47	4	51
10	John Ward	1964–1968	8	16	1	17
11	Roy Harford	1968	3	11	0	11
12	Barry Milburn	1969	3	6	2	8
13	Ken Wadsworth	1969–1976	33	92	4	96
14	Warren Lees	1976–1983	21	52	7	59
15	Jock Edwards	1977–1978	4	7	0	7
16	Bruce Edgar	1978	1	3	0	3
17	Ian Smith	1980–1992	63	168	8	176
18	Tony Blain	1986–1994	9	18	2	20
19	Adam Parore	1990–2002	67	194	7	201
20	Lee Germon	1995–1997	12	27	2	29
21	Robbie Hart	2002–2003	11	29	1	30
22	Brendon McCullum	2004–2013	52	167	11	178
23	Gareth Hopkins	2008–2010	4	9	0	9
24	Reece Young	2011	5	8	0	8
25	BJ Watling	2012–2021	75	267	8	275
26	Kruger van Wyk	2012	9	23	1	24
27	Luke Ronchi	2015	1	4	0	4
28	Tom Latham	2017–2019	12	11	0	12
29	Tom Blundell	2017–present	4	12	0	12
