= International cricket in 1971–72 =

International cricket season

The 1971–72 international cricket season was from September 1971 to April 1972.

== Season overview ==
International tours
| Start date | Home team | Away team | Results [Matches] | | | |
| Start date | Home team | Away team | Test | ODI | FC | LA |
|---|---|---|---|---|---|---|
| 26 November 1971 | Australia | World XI | — | — | 1–2 [5] | 1–1 [3] |
| 16 February 1972 | West Indies | New Zealand | 0–0 [5] | — | — | — |

== November ==
=== World XI in Australia ===
First-class "Test" series
| No. | Date | Home captain | Away captain | Venue | Result |
|---|---|---|---|---|---|
| Match 01 | 26 November–1 December | Ian Chappell | Garfield Sobers | Brisbane Cricket Ground, Brisbane | Match drawn |
| Match 02 | 10–12 December | Ian Chappell | Garfield Sobers | WACA Ground, Perth | Australia by an innings and 11 runs |
| Match 03 | 1–6 January | Ian Chappell | Garfield Sobers | Melbourne Cricket Ground, Melbourne | Rest of the World XI by 96 runs |
| Match 04 | 8–13 January | Ian Chappell | Garfield Sobers | Sydney Cricket Ground, Sydney | Match drawn |
| Match 05 | 28 January–1 February | Ian Chappell | Garfield Sobers | Adelaide Oval, Adelaide | Rest of the World XI by 9 wickets |
List A "ODI" series
| No. | Date | Home captain | Away captain | Venue | Result |
| Match 01 | 14 December | Ian Chappell | Garfield Sobers | WACA Ground, Perth | Rest of the World XI by 44 runs |
| Match 02 | 15 January | Ian Chappell | Garfield Sobers | Sydney Cricket Ground, Sydney | Match abandoned |
| Match 03 | 16 January | Ian Chappell | Garfield Sobers | Melbourne Cricket Ground, Melbourne | Australia by 10 wickets |

== February ==
=== New Zealand in the West Indies ===
Test Series
| No. | Date | Home captain | Away captain | Venue | Result |
|---|---|---|---|---|---|
| Test 693 | 16–21 February | Garfield Sobers | Graham Dowling | Sabina Park, Kingston | Match drawn |
| Test 694 | 9–14 March | Garfield Sobers | Graham Dowling | Queen's Park Oval, Port of Spain | Match drawn |
| Test 695 | 23–28 March | Garfield Sobers | Bevan Congdon | Kensington Oval, Bridgetown | Match drawn |
| Test 696 | 6–11 April | Garfield Sobers | Bevan Congdon | Bourda, Georgetown | Match drawn |
| Test 697 | 20–26 April | Garfield Sobers | Bevan Congdon | Queen's Park Oval, Port of Spain | Match drawn |
