= International cricket in 1967–68 =

International cricket season

The 1967–68 international cricket season was from December 1967 to April 1968.

== Season overview ==
International tours
Start date	Home team	Away team	Results [Matches]			
Start date	Home team	Away team	Test	ODI	FC	LA
23 December 1967	Australia	India	4–0 [4]	—	—	—
19 January 1968	West Indies	England	0–1 [5]	—	—	—
15 February 1968	New Zealand	India	1–3 [4]	—	—	—
12 April 1968	Ceylon	India	—	—	1–0 [1]	—

== December ==
=== India in Australia ===
Test series
No.	Date	Home captain	Away captain	Venue	Result
Test 624	23–28 December	Bob Simpson	Chandu Borde	Adelaide Oval, Adelaide	Australia by 146 runs
Test 625	30 Dec–3 January	Bob Simpson	Mansoor Ali Khan Pataudi	Melbourne Cricket Ground, Melbourne	Australia by an innings and 4 runs
Test 626	19–24 January	Bill Lawry	Mansoor Ali Khan Pataudi	The Gabba, Brisbane	Australia by 39 runs
Test 628	26–31 January	Bill Lawry	Mansoor Ali Khan Pataudi	Sydney Cricket Ground, Sydney	Australia by 144 runs

== January ==
=== England in the West Indies ===
Wisden Trophy Test Series
No.	Date	Home captain	Away captain	Venue	Result
Test 627	19–24 January	Colin Cowdrey	Garfield Sobers	Queen's Park Oval, Port of Spain	Match drawn
Test 629	8–14 February	Colin Cowdrey	Garfield Sobers	Sabina Park, Kingston	Match drawn
Test 633	29 Feb–5 March	Colin Cowdrey	Garfield Sobers	Kensington Oval, Bridgetown	Match drawn
Test 635	14–19 March	Colin Cowdrey	Garfield Sobers	Queen's Park Oval, Port of Spain	England by 7 wickets
Test 636	28 Mar–3 April	Colin Cowdrey	Garfield Sobers	Bourda, Georgetown	Match drawn

== February ==
=== India in New Zealand ===
Test series
No.	Date	Home captain	Away captain	Venue	Result
Test 630	15–20 February	Barry Sinclair	Mansoor Ali Khan Pataudi	Carisbrook, Dunedin	India by 5 wickets
Test 631	22–27 February	Graham Dowling	Mansoor Ali Khan Pataudi	AMI Stadium, Christchurch	New Zealand by 6 wickets
Test 632	29 Feb–4 March	Graham Dowling	Mansoor Ali Khan Pataudi	Basin Reserve, Wellington	India by 8 wickets
Test 634	7–12 March	Graham Dowling	Mansoor Ali Khan Pataudi	Eden Park, Auckland	India by 272 runs

== April ==
=== India in Ceylon ===
MJ Gopalan Trophy
No.	Date	Home captain	Away captain	Venue	Result
FC Match	12–14 April	Sarath Wimalaratne	Patamada Belliappa	P Saravanamuttu Stadium, Colombo	Ceylon by 105 runs
