= Peter Truscott =

New Zealand cricketer (1941–2025)

Personal information
- Full name: Peter Bennetts Truscott
- Born: 14 August 1941; Pahiatua, New Zealand
- Died: 1 September 2025 (aged 84); Taupō, New Zealand
- Batting: Right-handed

International information
- National side: New Zealand (1965)
- Only Test (cap 105): 12 February 1965 v Pakistan

Domestic team information
- Years: Team
- 1958/58–1960/61: Southland
- 1961/62: Canterbury
- 1964/65–1965/66: Wellington

Career statistics
Competition	Test	First-class
Matches	1	18
Runs scored	29	904
Batting average	14.50	25.82
100s/50s	0/0	1/4
Top score	26	165
Balls bowled	0	204
Wickets	–	2
Bowling average	–	48.50
5 wickets in innings	–	0
10 wickets in match	–	0
Best bowling	–	2/60
Catches/stumpings	1/–	10/–
- Source: Cricinfo, 8 September 2025

Peter Bennetts Truscott (14 August 1941 – 1 September 2025) was a New Zealand cricketer who played one Test match against Pakistan in 1965.

== Cricket career ==
Truscott was a right-handed batsman who had a brief first-class career, lasting just five years. After having played for Southland and Otago age-group and B sides, he played three first-class matches for Canterbury without great success in 1961–62, and in the next two seasons played only for the New Zealand Under-23 side in one match each season. In 1963–64, he scored 165 when opening the batting for the Under-23s against Auckland, and this remained his only first-class century.

Described during his career as "one of the most elegant and forceful stroke-makers in New Zealand cricket", Truscott played regularly in 1964–65 and 1965–66 for Wellington. In February 1965 he scored 45 and 50 at number three against Otago, taking part in second-wicket partnerships of 84 and 98 with Bruce Murray, and he was selected for the Third Test against Pakistan at Christchurch that followed a few days later. Opening the batting, he scored 3 and 26, but was not picked for the New Zealand team to tour India, Pakistan and England in 1965. He played for a New Zealand Cricket Council President's XI against the touring MCC in 1965–66, but played no more first-class cricket after the end of the season.

== Later life and death ==
In October 1966, Truscott and his family moved to Perth, Western Australia, where he had been transferred in his work as a bank accountant. Later he returned to New Zealand and ran a hotel in Nelson, then a motel in Whangārei, and also worked in the real estate business. He retired to live with his wife Sue in Orewa, a suburb of Auckland.

Truscott died in Taupō on 1 September 2025, at the age of 84.

== See also ==
- One-Test wonder
