= Mufasir-ul-Haq =

Pakistani cricketer (1944–1983)

Personal information
- Born: 16 August 1944; Karnal, British India
- Died: 27 July 1983 (aged 38); Karachi, Pakistan
- Batting: Right-handed
- Bowling: Left-arm fast-medium

International information
- National side: Pakistan
- Only Test (cap 51): 12 February 1965 v New Zealand

Career statistics
Competition	Test	First-class
Matches	1	50
Runs scored	8	286
Batting average	–	7.15
100s/50s	0/0	0/0
Top score	8*	35
Balls bowled	222	6,378
Wickets	3	105
Bowling average	28.00	26.78
5 wickets in innings	0	0
10 wickets in match	0	0
Best bowling	2/50	4/16
Catches/stumpings	1/–	21/–
- Source: ESPNCricinfo, 15 June 2017

Mufasir-ul-Haq (16 August 1944 – 27 July 1983) was a Pakistani cricketer who played in one Test match in 1965.

A left-arm opening bowler, Mufasir played first-class cricket in Pakistan from 1960–61 to 1975–76. He toured Australia and New Zealand in 1964–65, playing his only Test at Lancaster Park, Christchurch, where he took three wickets for 84, including the wickets of Ross Morgan (twice) and Bevan Congdon. His best first-class bowling figures, 4 for 16, came in his second match, for Karachi Whites against Karachi Greens in 1961–62.

He umpired one first-class match in Pakistan in 1975–76, just a few weeks after playing his last match.

He was only the second Pakistani Test cricketer to die, after Amir Elahi three years earlier.
