= New Zealand cricket team in Pakistan in 1964–65 =

International cricket tour

The New Zealand national cricket team toured Pakistan in March to April 1965 and played a three-match Test series against the Pakistan national cricket team. Pakistan won the Test series 2–0. New Zealand were captained by John Reid and Pakistan by Hanif Mohammad.

== Test series summary ==
=== First Test ===
27–30 March 1965
(5-day match)
Scorecard

New Zealand	v	Pakistan
175 (56.5 overs); BR Taylor 76; Pervez Sajjad 4/42 (16 overs)		318 (116.3 overs); Saeed Ahmed 68; BR Taylor 3/38 (15 overs)
79 (47 overs); BW Sinclair 21; Pervez Sajjad 4/5 (12 overs)

Pakistan won by an innings and 64 runs
Pindi Club Ground, Rawalpindi
Umpires: Qamaruddin Butt and Shujauddin

- Pakistan won the toss and elected to field.
- 29 March was taken as a rest day.
- The match was scheduled for five days but completed in three.
- Salahuddin (PAK) made his Test debut.

=== Second Test ===
2–7 April 1965
(5-day match)
Scorecard

Pakistan	v	New Zealand
385/7d (167 overs); Hanif Mohammad 203*; FJ Cameron 4/90 (44 overs)		482/6d (209 overs); BW Sinclair 130; Mohammad Farooq 2/71 (41 overs)
194/8d (77 overs); Majid Khan 44; FJ Cameron 2/15 (11 overs)

Match drawn
Lahore Stadium, Lahore
Umpires: Akhtar Hussain and Shujauddin

- New Zealand won the toss and elected to field.
- 5 April was taken as a rest day.

=== Third Test ===
9–14 April 1965
(5-day match)
Scorecard

New Zealand	v	Pakistan
285 (103 overs); JR Reid 128; Asif Iqbal 3/35 (11 overs)		307/8d (121 overs); Saeed Ahmed 172; RC Motz 2/35 (22 overs)
223 (99.4 overs); JR Reid 76; Intikhab Alam 4/39 (26.4 overs)		202/2 (60 overs); Mohammad Ilyas 126; JR Reid 1/6 (1 over)

Pakistan won by 8 wickets
National Stadium, Karachi
Umpires: Daud Khan and Shujauddin

- New Zealand won the toss and elected to bat.
- 12 April was taken as a rest day.
