= William Dow (disambiguation) =

William Dow may refer to:

- William Dow (1800–1968), British-born brewer and financier of Montreal, Quebec, Canada
- Billy Dow (1844–1943), Scottish footballer, see List of Bury F.C. players (1–24 appearances)
- William Gould Dow (1895–1999), American scientist
- Bill Dow (cricketer) (1933–2026), Scottish cricketer
- Bill Dow (born 1951), Canadian actor
