= International cricket in 1973–74 =

International cricket season

The 1973–74 international cricket season was from September 1973 to April 1974.

== Season overview ==
International tours
Start date	Home team	Away team	Results [Matches]			
Start date	Home team	Away team	Test	ODI	FC	LA
29 December 1973	Australia	New Zealand	2–0 [3]	—	—	—
2 February 1974	West Indies	England	1–1 [5]	—	—	—
1 March 1974	New Zealand	Australia	1–1 [3]	2–0 [2]	—	—

== December ==
=== New Zealand in Australia ===
Test Series
No.	Date	Home captain	Away captain	Venue	Result
Test 728	29 Dec–2 January	Ian Chappell	Bevan Congdon	Melbourne Cricket Ground, Melbourne	Australia by an innings and 25 runs
Test 729	5–10 January	Ian Chappell	Bevan Congdon	Sydney Cricket Ground, Sydney	Match drawn
Test 730	26–31 January	Ian Chappell	Bevan Congdon	Adelaide Oval, Adelaide	Australia by an innings and 57 runs

== February ==
=== England in the West Indies ===
Wisden Trophy Test Series
No.	Date	Home captain	Away captain	Venue	Result
Test 731	2–7 February	Rohan Kanhai	Mike Denness	Queen's Park Oval, Port of Spain	West Indies by 7 wickets
Test 732	16–21 February	Rohan Kanhai	Mike Denness	Sabina Park, Kingston	Match drawn
Test 734	6–11 March	Rohan Kanhai	Mike Denness	Kensington Oval, Bridgetown	Match drawn
Test 737	22–27 March	Rohan Kanhai	Mike Denness	Bourda, Georgetown	Match drawn
Test 738	30 Mar–5 April	Rohan Kanhai	Mike Denness	Queen's Park Oval, Port of Spain	England by 26 runs

== March ==
=== Australia in New Zealand ===
Test series
No.	Date	Home captain	Away captain	Venue	Result
Test 733	1–6 March	Bevan Congdon	Ian Chappell	Basin Reserve, Wellington	Match drawn
Test 735	8–13 March	Bevan Congdon	Ian Chappell	AMI Stadium, Christchurch	New Zealand by 5 wickets
Test 736	22–24 March	Bevan Congdon	Ian Chappell	Eden Park, Auckland	Australia by 297 runs
ODI series
No.	Date	Home captain	Away captain	Venue	Result
ODI 10	30 March	Bevan Congdon	Ian Chappell	Carisbrook, Dunedin	Australia by 7 wickets
ODI 11	31 March	Bevan Congdon	Ian Chappell	AMI Stadium, Christchurch	Australia by 31 runs
