= International cricket in 1969 =

International cricket season

The 1969 International cricket season was from May 1969 to August 1969.

== Season overview ==
International tours
Start date	Home team	Away team	Results [Matches]			
Start date	Home team	Away team	Test	ODI	FC	LA
12 June 1969	England	West Indies	2–0 [3]	—	—	—
24 July 1969	England	New Zealand	2–0 [3]	—	—	—

== June ==
=== West Indies in England ===
Wisden Trophy Test series
No.	Date	Home captain	Away captain	Venue	Result
Test 653	12–17 June	Ray Illingworth	Garfield Sobers	Old Trafford Cricket Ground, Manchester	England by 10 wickets
Test 654	26 Jun–1 July	Ray Illingworth	Garfield Sobers	Lord's, London	Match drawn
Test 655	10–15 July	Ray Illingworth	Garfield Sobers	Headingley Cricket Ground, Leeds	England by 30 runs

== July ==
=== New Zealand in England ===
Test series
No.	Date	Home captain	Away captain	Venue	Result
Test 656	24–28 July	Ray Illingworth	Graham Dowling	Lord's, London	England by 230 runs
Test 657	7–12 August	Ray Illingworth	Graham Dowling	Trent Bridge, Nottingham	Match drawn
Test 658	21–26 August	Ray Illingworth	Graham Dowling	Kennington Oval, London	England by 8 wickets
