= Terry Jarvis =

New Zealand businessman and cricketer

Personal information
- Full name: Terrence Wayne Jarvis
- Born: 29 July 1944 (age 82); Auckland, New Zealand
- Batting: Right-handed
- Bowling: Right-arm
- Role: Opening batsman

International information
- National side: New Zealand (1965–1973)
- Test debut (cap 106): 27 February 1965 v India
- Last Test: 16 February 1973 v Pakistan

Domestic team information
- Years: Team
- 1964/65–1968/69: Auckland
- 1969/70–1970/71: Canterbury
- 1971/72–1976/77: Auckland

Career statistics
Competition	Test	FC	LA
Matches	13	97	8
Runs scored	625	4,666	155
Batting average	29.76	29.34	22.14
100s/50s	1/2	6/26	0/0
Top score	182	182	38
Balls bowled	12	168	–
Wickets	0	0	–
Bowling average	–	–	–
5 wickets in innings	–	–	–
10 wickets in match	–	–	–
Best bowling	–	–	–
Catches/stumpings	3/–	102/–	3/–
- Source: Cricinfo, 1 April 2017

Terrence Wayne Jarvis (born 29 July 1944) is a New Zealand businessman and former cricketer who played 13 Test matches for New Zealand between 1965 and 1973. With Glenn Turner, Jarvis holds the opening Test partnership record for New Zealand of 387, scored against the West Indies in Georgetown, Guyana, during the 1971–72 season.

== Early career ==
Terry Jarvis was raised in the Auckland suburb of Remuera and attended Auckland Grammar School from 1958 to 1960, where he played in the 1st Eleven, a team that included two future New Zealand Test captains, Mark Burgess and Hedley Howarth, and another future Test player, Ross Morgan. He represented Auckland at both under-20 and under-23 levels in 1962–63.

Jarvis made his first-class debut in the 1964–65 season. Opening the batting in his first match, he scored 88 in Auckland's innings victory over Northern Districts. In seven matches he scored 353 runs at an average of 32.09, and was selected for the tour of India, Pakistan and England in 1965.

== International career ==
Jarvis made his Test debut in the First Test against India in Madras in February 1965. In the first innings, opening with Graham Dowling, he batted more than two hours in making nine runs; in the second he made 40 not out. Bevan Congdon replaced him as opener in the Second and Third Tests, but Jarvis returned for the Fourth Test and made 34 and 77, New Zealand's top score in the second innings. He played the three Tests that followed against Pakistan with only moderate success. When the team went on to England he was twice hospitalised owing to an illness he contracted in India, and he was never able to strike form, and did not play in any of the Tests.

He played one Test against England in 1965–66, then all four representative matches (not Tests) against the touring Australian team in 1966–67, when he was New Zealand's second-highest scorer after Dowling, with 225 runs at an average of 32.14. He then played no more Tests until he toured the West Indies in 1971-72.

In 1968–69, in his 48th first-class match, he scored his first century, in the Plunket Shield match against Wellington. After three low-scoring innings totalling 504 runs, Auckland needed 217 runs to win. Jarvis opened as usual and made 118 not out, and Auckland won by nine wickets. He scored 305 runs at an average of 43.57 in the 1971–72 domestic season, and was selected to tour the West Indies. In the Fourth Test at Georgetown, West Indies batted first and declared at 365 for 7 early on the third of the five days. Glenn Turner and Jarvis then opened for New Zealand and scored 387 together in nine hours, Jarvis making 182 off 555 balls and Turner going on to 259 off 759 balls. The match was drawn after only ten wickets fell in almost five full days of cricket.

After the West Indies tour, Jarvis continued playing for Auckland until 1976–77, and played three more Tests, in 1972–73 against Pakistan, when he was not successful, scoring only 46 runs.

== Beyond cricket ==
On leaving school Jarvis began work as a sales representative for the Auckland stock and station company, Alfred Buckland & Sons Ltd., selling textiles such as jute wool bales, which the company imported. He then went into business on his own account, forming Jarvis Trading Company Ltd., importing and manufacturing similar products at premises in East Tāmaki, a suburb of Auckland. He also became involved in the development and sale of industrial land in East Tamaki.

In 1987 Jarvis was one of the co-founders of Sky TV in New Zealand. He also became involved in the breeding and racing of thoroughbreds, while owning The Oaks stud property near Cambridge, in the Waikato. He owned The Oaks from 1998 to 2002, when he sold it in order to concentrate on racing rather than breeding. He was New Zealand's racehorse owner of the year in 2001. In 2001 his wealth was estimated at NZ$50 million.

In 2009 Jarvis bought the adjacent former home of Sir Edmund Hillary in Remuera in order to extend his own property. The house, after being gifted to the nation, was moved to Sir Edmund Hillary Collegiate in the Auckland suburb of Ōtara in 2011. In 2010 Jarvis was the major sponsor of the Terry Jarvis Centre, an indoor sports facility owned by the Remuera Parnell Sports Committee Charitable Trust and managed by the Parnell Cricket Club, his former club, located on Shore Road, close to his childhood home in Portland Road, Remuera.
