= International cricket in 1973 =

International cricket season

The 1973 international cricket season extended from May to August 1973.

== Season overview ==
International tours
Start date	Home team	Away team	Results [Matches]			
Start date	Home team	Away team	Test	ODI	FC	LA
2 June 1973	England	New Zealand	2–0 [3]	1–0 [2]	—	—
26 July 1974	England	West Indies	0–2 [3]	1–1 [2]	—	—

== June ==
=== New Zealand in England ===
Test series
No.	Date	Home captain	Away captain	Venue	Result
Test 722	7–12 June	Ray Illingworth	Bevan Congdon	Trent Bridge, Nottingham	England by 38 runs
Test 723	21–26 June	Ray Illingworth	Bevan Congdon	Lord's, London	Match drawn
Test 724	5–10 July	Ray Illingworth	Bevan Congdon	Headingley, Leeds	England by an innings and 1 runs
Prudential Trophy ODI series
No.	Date	Home captain	Away captain	Venue	Result
ODI 6	18 July	Ray Illingworth	Bevan Congdon	Old Trafford Cricket Ground, Manchester	England by 7 wickets
ODI 7	20 July	Ray Illingworth	Bevan Congdon	St Helen's, Swansea	No result

== July ==
=== West Indies in England ===
Wisden Trophy Test series
No.	Date	Home captain	Away captain	Venue	Result
Test 725	26–31 July	Mike Denness	Rohan Kanhai	Kennington Oval, London	West Indies by 158 runs
Test 726	9–14 August	Mike Denness	Rohan Kanhai	Edgbaston Cricket Ground, Birmingham	Match drawn
Test 727	23–27 August	Mike Denness	Rohan Kanhai	Lord's, London	West Indies by an innings and 226 runs
Prudential Trophy ODI series
No.	Date	Home captain	Away captain	Venue	Result
ODI 8	5 September	Mike Denness	Rohan Kanhai	Headingley, Leeds	England by 1 wicket
ODI 9	7 September	Mike Denness	Rohan Kanhai	Kennington Oval, London	West Indies by 8 wickets
