= Ramesh Saxena =

Personal information
- Full name: Ramesh Chand Saxena
- Born: 20 September 1944; Delhi, British India
- Died: 16 August 2011 (aged 66); Jamshedpur, Jharkhand, India
- Batting: Right-handed
- Bowling: Legbreak

International information
- National side: India
- Only Test (cap 115): 8 June 1967 v England

Career statistics
| Competition | Test | First-class |
|---|---|---|
| Matches | 1 | 149 |
| Runs scored | 25 | 8,155 |
| Batting average | 12.50 | 40.37 |
| 100s/50s | 0/0 | 17/42 |
| Top score | 16 | 202* |
| Balls bowled | 12 | 1,716 |
| Wickets | 0 | 33 |
| Bowling average | – | 28.27 |
| 5 wickets in innings | – | 0 |
| 10 wickets in match | – | 0 |
| Best bowling | – | 4/24 |
| Catches/stumpings | 0/– | 65/– |
- Source: CricInfo, 20 November 2022

Ramesh Chand Saxena (20 September 1944 – 16 August 2011) was an Indian cricketer who played in one Test match in 1967. He was a great batsman in the Bihar Ranji Trophy team and was a mentor to many young cricketers from Bihar and Jharkhand.

== Life and career ==
Saxena made his first-class debut for Delhi vs Southern Punjab as a 16-year-old in the 1960/61 Ranji Trophy, hitting an unbeaten 113 in his first first-class innings. He played for Delhi until 1965–66, then moved to Bihar, playing for them from 1966–67 to 1981–82. He also played for North Zone and East Zone in the Duleep Trophy. His highest score was 202 not out for Bihar against Assam in 1969–70. He had the reputation of one of the best players of spin bowling in India.

Saxena made his Test debut for India in a match against England in Leeds in 1967. England batted first and declared on 550/4, with Geoffrey Boycott scoring an unbeaten 246 and Saxena bowling 2 wicketless overs. He then opened with Farokh Engineer in India's innings, but was out for just 9 as India were bowled out for 164 and forced to follow on. India put in an improved performance in the second innings, posting 510, but Saxena, batting at 7, only contributed 16. England then knocked off the required runs to seal a 6 wicket victory. He toured Australia and New Zealand with the Indian team later that year but did not play in any of the eight Test matches. He captained Bihar for five seasons and also captained East Zone several times in the Duleep Trophy.

Saxena served as a Test selector in the 1980s. He died in hospital after suffering a stroke and consequent illnesses. He left a wife and two sons.
