= Neville Huxford =

New Zealand cricketer

Personal information
- Full name: Neville Alfred Huxford
- Born: 27 October 1937; Wellington, New Zealand
- Died: 21 November 2006 (aged 69); Auckland, New Zealand
- Batting: Right-handed
- Bowling: Right-arm medium-fast

Domestic team information
- Years: Team
- 1964/65–1966/67: Wellington
- 1967/68–1969/70: Canterbury

Career statistics
Competition	First-class
Matches	31
Runs scored	109
Batting average	8.38
100s/50s	0/0
Top score	19
Balls bowled	7,072
Wickets	101
Bowling average	23.95
5 wickets in innings	5
10 wickets in match	0
Best bowling	7/95
Catches/stumpings	13/–
- Source: Cricinfo, 28 February 2018

Neville Alfred Huxford (27 October 1937 – 21 November 2006) was a cricketer who played first-class cricket for Wellington and Canterbury in New Zealand from 1965 to 1970.

Huxford was a consistent pace bowler throughout his career, but he never excelled the figures he achieved in his first two matches. On his first-class debut in January 1965 he took 7 for 95 in the first innings for Wellington against the touring Pakistan team. In his next match a week later, his first in the Plunket Shield, he took 6 for 38 in the first innings against Auckland.
