= Bill Thomson (cricketer) =

New Zealand cricketer and hockey player (1943–2019)

Personal information
- Full name: William Allan Thomson
- Born: 4 August 1943; Methven, New Zealand
- Died: 22 October 2019 (aged 76); Christchurch, New Zealand
- Batting: Left-handed
- Relatives: Keith Thomson (brother)
- Source: Cricinfo, 20 October 2020

William Allan Thomson (4 August 1943 – 22 October 2019) was a New Zealand cricketer and hockey player.

Thomson was an aggressive left-handed batsman who usually opened for Sydenham in Christchurch senior cricket in a career that produced more than 9000 runs over 25 seasons. He played first-class cricket twice: once for New Zealand Under-23 in 1964–65, and once for Canterbury nine seasons later in the Plunket Shield against Auckland when he scored 55 in the second innings; Canterbury had followed on 185 runs behind but went on to win by 26 runs. His brother Keith captained Canterbury in this match.

Bill and Keith Thomson were also international hockey players. They represented New Zealand at hockey at the 1968 Olympics in Mexico City.

Thomson died on 22 October 2019 at Christchurch Hospital, aged 76.

== See also ==
- List of Canterbury representative cricketers
