= John Ward (New Zealand cricketer) =

New Zealand cricketer (1937–2021)

Personal information
- Full name: John Thomas Ward
- Born: 11 March 1937; Timaru, New Zealand
- Died: 12 January 2021 (aged 83); Timaru, New Zealand
- Batting: Right-handed
- Role: Wicket-keeper
- Relatives: Barry Ward (son)

International information
- National side: New Zealand (1964–1968)
- Test debut (cap 99): 21 February 1964 v South Africa
- Last Test: 7 March 1968 v India

Career statistics
Competition	Test	First-class
Matches	8	95
Runs scored	75	1,117
Batting average	12.50	12.41
100s/50s	0/0	0/1
Top score	35*	54*
Catches/stumpings	16/1	227/27
- Source: CricInfo, 1 April 2017

John Thomas Ward (11 March 1937 – 12 January 2021) was a New Zealand cricketer who played as a wicket-keeper in eight Test matches between 1964 and 1968. Ward's Test captain John Reid said that he was "easily the best wicketkeeper in New Zealand in his time, but was plagued by injury."

== Cricket career ==
Ward made his first-class debut for South Island against North Island in a trial match for the 1958 tour of England. He took five catches in the first innings, and was selected as Eric Petrie's deputy on the tour. He made his Plunket Shield debut for Canterbury in 1959–60, and was selected to tour South Africa in 1961-62, where he served as deputy to Artie Dick.

He finally made his Test debut in 1963–64 in the First Test against the South African touring team, but then lost his place to Dick, who was a superior batsman. He replaced Dick for the Third Test against Pakistan in New Zealand in 1964–65, and went on the tour of India and Pakistan in 1965 as the sole wicket-keeper. He made his highest Test score of 35 not out in the First Test against India, when he and Richard Collinge put on 61 for the last wicket, but injury forced him out after the Indian leg of the tour, and Dick again replaced him. Later that year, in England, Ward returned to the side, replacing Dick for the Third Test. His last Test was the Fourth Test against India in 1967-68.

Ward continued to play for Canterbury until the end of the 1970–71 season. He scored his only first-class fifty against Wellington in 1969-70 when, batting at number five, he made 54 not out. He represented South Canterbury in the Hawke Cup from 1960 to 1976.

His son Barry kept wicket for Canterbury in the 1986–87 season. Ward died in Timaru on 12 January 2021 after a short illness, aged 83.
