= Derek Underwood =

English cricketer (1945–2024)

Derek Underwood MBE
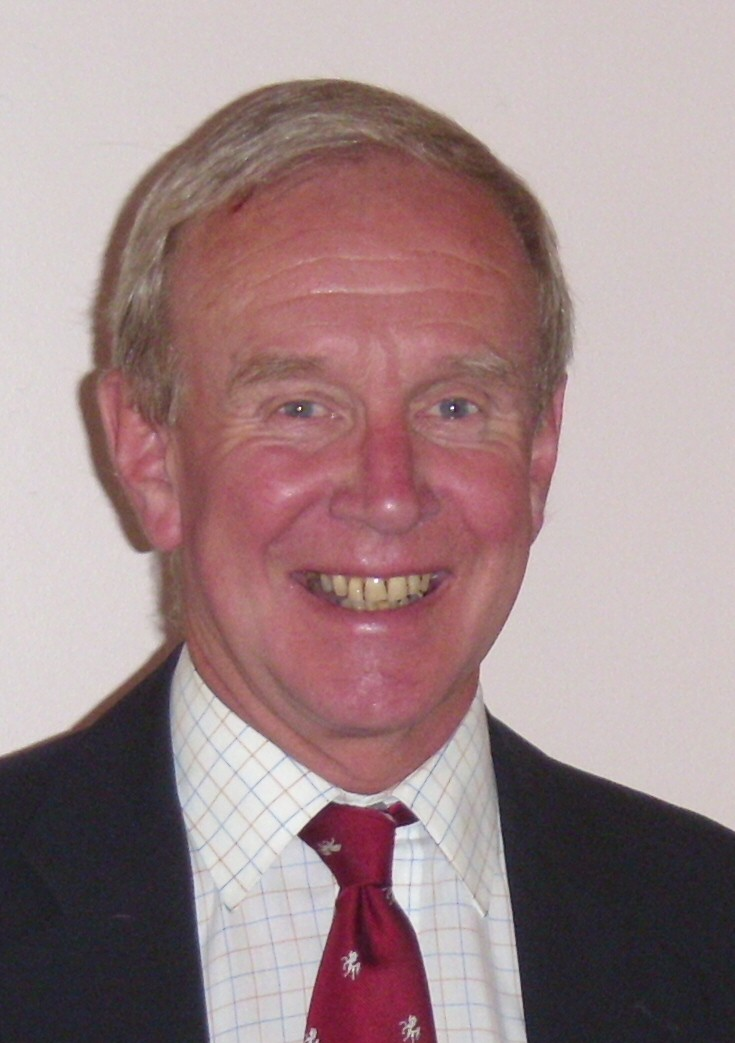
- Underwood in 2008

Personal information
- Full name: Derek Leslie Underwood
- Born: 8 June 1945; Bromley, Kent, England
- Died: 15 April 2024 (aged 78)
- Nickname: Deadly
- Batting: Right-handed
- Bowling: Slow left arm orthodox Left arm medium
- Role: Bowler

International information
- National side: England (1966–1982)
- Test debut (cap 433): 30 June 1966 v West Indies
- Last Test: 17 February 1982 v Sri Lanka
- ODI debut (cap 20): 18 July 1973 v New Zealand
- Last ODI: 14 February 1982 v Sri Lanka

Domestic team information
- Years: Team
- 1963–1987: Kent

Career statistics
Competition	Tests	ODI	FC	LA
Matches	86	26	676	411
Runs scored	937	53	5,165	815
Batting average	11.56	5.88	10.12	7.02
100s/50s	0/0	0/0	1/2	0/0
Top score	45*	17	111	28
Balls bowled	21,862	1,278	139,783	19,825
Wickets	297	32	2,465	572
Bowling average	25.83	22.93	20.28	19.40
5 wickets in innings	17	0	153	8
10 wickets in match	6	0	47	0
Best bowling	8/51	4/44	9/28	8/31
Catches/stumpings	44/–	6/–	261/–	108/–
- Source: CricInfo, 25 March 2008

Derek Leslie Underwood MBE (8 June 1945 – 15 April 2024) was an English international cricketer. In retirement he became president of the Marylebone Cricket Club (MCC) in 2008.

Through much of his career, Underwood was regarded as one of the best bowlers in Test cricket. Although classified as a slow left-arm orthodox spin bowler, Underwood bowled at around medium pace. He was often unplayable on seaming English wickets, particularly sticky wickets, earning his nickname 'Deadly'.

Underwood was a first-class bowler from his teens and took his 100th Test wicket and 1,000th first-class wicket in 1971, aged only 25. Only George Lohmann and Wilfred Rhodes had secured a thousand wickets at an earlier age. His England career ended when he went on the rebel tour to South Africa, finishing his Test career with 297 wickets.

On 16 July 2009, Underwood was inducted into the ICC Cricket Hall of Fame.

== Early life and county career ==
Underwood was born in Bromley Maternity Hospital, the second son of Leslie Frank Underwood and Evelyn Annie Wells. His early days were spent watching his father, a right-arm medium pace bowler, play for Farnborough Cricket Club, where elder brother Keith also played. Underwood was educated at Beckenham and Penge Grammar School for Boys and in 1961 he took all ten wickets for the school's first XI, of which his brother was the captain, against Bromley Grammar School.

Underwood played county cricket for Kent, making his first-class debut against Yorkshire aged 17 in 1963. He became the youngest player to take 100 County Championship wickets in a debut season. He went on to take 100 wickets in a season a further nine times. His batting was less accomplished, averaging barely over ten runs per innings in 676 matches. He remained at Kent for 24 years, the whole of his first-class career.

Underwood made his only first-class century for Kent against Sussex in 1984 aged 39, having batted as a nightwatchman.

== Test career ==
Underwood took the last four Australian wickets in 27 balls in the final half an hour at the end of the fifth Test in 1968, after a heavy thunderstorm on the fifth day had all but ended the match, to square an Ashes series that Australia were leading 1–0. He was named in 1969 as one of the Wisden Cricketers of the Year. Underwood also toured Australia in 1970–71, dismissing Terry Jenner to win the seventh Test at Sydney, and regain the Ashes.

According to the retrospective ICC Test bowler rankings, Underwood was ranked number 1 in the world from September 1969 to August 1973. He reached a peak rating of 907 after his 12-wicket haul against New Zealand in the 1971 series. He was England's leading wicket taker with spin.

Underwood was noted for his consistent accuracy, and his inswinging arm ball was particularly noted for dismissing batsmen leg before wicket. Keith Dunstan wrote that he was "inclined to wear a hole in the pitch by dropping the ball on the same spot ...".

Underwood used to say that bowling was a "low mentality profession: plug away, line and length, until there's a mistake", and sooner or later every batsman would make a mistake.

== World Series Cricket and rebel South African tour ==
Underwood was one of six England cricketers (the others being John Snow, Alan Knott, Dennis Amiss, Bob Woolmer and Tony Greig), to feature in Kerry Packer's World Series Cricket in the late 1970s.

He also went on the rebel tour South Africa in 1981–82, bringing his England career to an end as it was in defiance of the sporting ban against the apartheid state. For this he and the other rebels were banned from international cricket for three years.

== Later career ==
Underwood was almost unplayable on damp wickets, but on dry tracks he would often push the ball through a little quicker and flatter, not wanting to risk being hit over his head, which he always hated.

At the age of 39, he scored his first and only first-class century (111), in his 591st first-class match in July 1984. It was played at Hastings, a favourite bowling haunt for Underwood who, having gone in to bat as nightwatchman, finally reached the hundred mark in his 618th first-class innings. The cricket writer Colin Bateman noted, "there was no more popular century that summer".

Underwood retired from cricket in 1987, at the age of 42, having taken 2,465 wickets at a little over 20 apiece.

== Recognition ==
Underwood was appointed a Member of the Order of the British Empire (MBE) in the 1981 New Year Honours for services to cricket.

In 1997, he became patron of the Primary Club, and in 2008 it was announced that he would serve as president of MCC for the following year.

In a Wisden article in 2004, he was selected as a member of England's greatest post-war XI.

Underwood was appointed an honorary fellow of Canterbury Christ Church University at a ceremony held at Canterbury Cathedral on 30 January 2009.

== Personal life ==
Underwood married Dawn Sullivan in October 1973 and they had two daughters.

Underwood became a consultant for ClubTurf Cricket Limited, joining his brother Keith who had become managing director.

On 15 April 2024, Underwood died from complications of dementia at the age of 78. Richard Thompson, chair of the England and Wales Cricket Board, said that "Underwood will be remembered as one of the finest spin bowlers this country has ever produced, and his remarkable record is testament to his enduring skill."

== Publications ==
- Underwood, Derek (1975). Beating the Bat. Stanley Paul. ISBN 9780091237509.

== See also ==
- List of international cricket five-wicket hauls by Derek Underwood
