= Bruce Murray (cricketer) =

New Zealand cricketer, teacher and historian (1940–2023)

Bruce Murray QSO
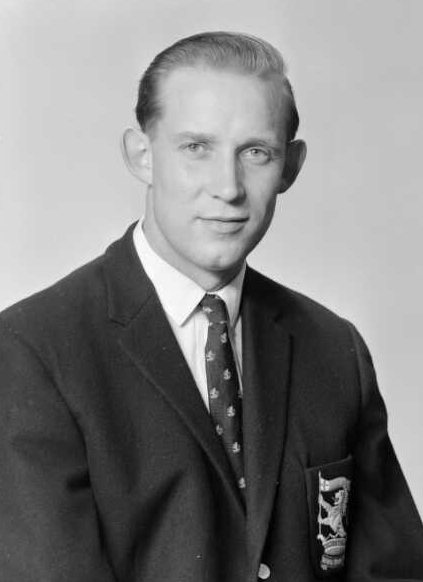
- Murray in 1967

Personal information
- Full name: Bruce Alexander Grenfell Murray
- Born: 18 September 1940; Johnsonville, New Zealand
- Died: 10 January 2023 (aged 82); Wellington, New Zealand
- Nickname: Bags
- Height: 6 ft 3 in (1.91 m)
- Batting: Right-handed
- Bowling: Legbreak
- Role: Opening batsman
- Relatives: Robbie Kerr (son-in-law); Amelia Kerr (granddaughter); Jess Kerr (granddaughter)

International information
- National side: New Zealand (1968–1971)
- Test debut (cap 114): 15 February 1968 v India
- Last Test: 25 February 1971 v England

Domestic team information
- Years: Team
- 1958/59–1972/73: Wellington

Career statistics
Competition	Test	FC	LA
Matches	13	102	1
Runs scored	598	6257	6
Batting average	23.92	35.55	6.00
100s/50s	0/5	6/43	0/0
Top score	90	213	6
Balls bowled	6	2382	–
Wickets	1	30	–
Bowling average	0.00	28.93	–
5 wickets in innings	0	0	–
10 wickets in match	0	0	–
Best bowling	1/0	4/43	–
Catches/stumpings	21/–	124/–	3/–
- Source: Cricinfo, 1 April 2017

Bruce Alexander Grenfell Murray QSO (18 September 1940 – 10 January 2023) was a Test cricketer for New Zealand who played 13 Tests as a right-handed opening batsman between 1968 and 1971. He was a school principal in the Wellington area from 1981 to 2002, and the author of several geography textbooks. After retiring from teaching, he was a cricket administrator in Wellington and a historian.

== Early life and education ==
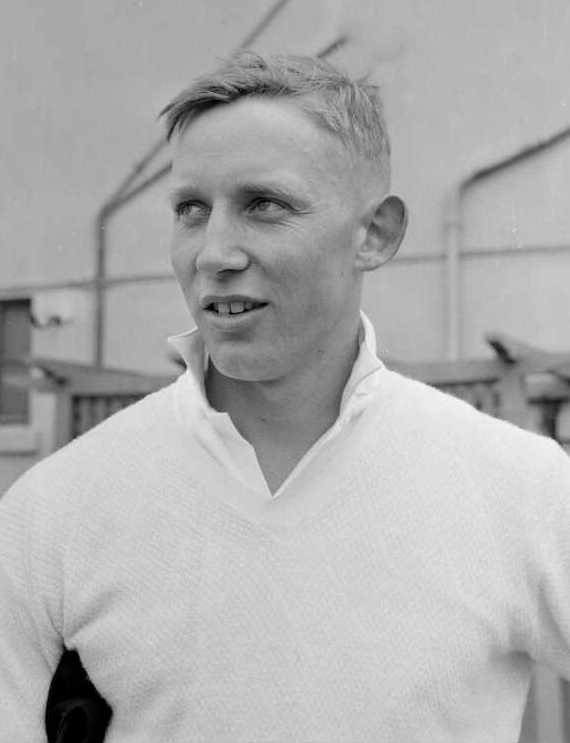
Murray in 1960

Born in Johnsonville, a northern suburb of Wellington, Murray attended Hutt Valley High School, then went to Victoria University of Wellington studying geography. He completed a Master of Arts degree in geography at the University of Canterbury. His masters thesis was on the geography of Tawa.

== Domestic career ==
A stroke-playing opening batsman and specialist slips fieldsman, Murray played his first first-class match at the age of 18 for Wellington against Central Districts at Wellington in 1958–59, scoring 49 runs in the first innings. He scored his first first-class century in 1961–62, 133 against Central Districts in a match that Wellington won by an innings.

His highest first-class innings came in 1968-69 when he scored 213 out of a total of 392 for 5 declared for Wellington against Otago in Dunedin. He was the leading scorer in the Plunket Shield in 1969–70, and had the highest average: in four matches he made 430 runs at an average of 61.42, with five fifties.

Murray faced the first ball in the first List A match in New Zealand, bowled by Ken Shuttleworth. It was a match of 40 eight-ball overs a side, between Wellington and the touring MCC at the Basin Reserve in February 1971. Shuttleworth dismissed him for 6, but Murray later took three catches, and Wellington won.

== International career ==
After several seasons in the Plunket Shield, Murray was selected for New Zealand's non-Test tour of Australia in 1967-68, where he was the team's highest scorer, with 351 runs at an average of 43.87.

Murray made his Test debut in early 1968 against India in Dunedin, scoring 17 and 54. In the first innings of the Second Test in Christchurch he scored 74, putting on 126 for the first wicket with Graham Dowling to set New Zealand on the path to its first Test victory over India; he also took four catches in the match.

Murray toured England, India and Pakistan with the New Zealand Test team in 1969. His highest Test score, 90, and another four catches, helped New Zealand to its first Test victory over Pakistan in a low-scoring match in Lahore in 1969–70; the day after the Test he scored 157 in three and a half hours for the New Zealanders against the BCCP President's XI in Rawalpindi. He was New Zealand's highest scorer on the five-month tour, with 1441 runs in 21 first-class matches at an average of 38.90.

Against the Australians in 1969-70, on a difficult pitch in the second unofficial Test at Lancaster Park, he scored a century, taking only 37 minutes over his second fifty. He so dominated the batting that, when he was dismissed for 110, New Zealand's score was only 144 for four.

Murray is one of just three players to have taken a Test wicket without conceding a run, giving him a career bowling average of 0.00. In the Third Test in Wellington in 1968 he bowled 6 balls and dismissed the Indian opener Syed Abid Ali.

The New Zealand cricket writer Dick Brittenden said Murray "batted with delightful serenity", even in Test matches. Opening the batting on the first morning of the Test against England at Trent Bridge in 1969 against the fast bowling of John Snow and Alan Ward, "Murray looked as unconcerned as if he was in the nets at school with some ambitious third-formers bowling at him".

== Beliefs ==
Along with his contemporaries in the New Zealand team Bryan Yuile and Vic Pollard, Murray would not play cricket on Sundays for religious reasons. The later careers of the three were therefore curtailed by the widespread introduction of Sunday play in the early 1970s. In 1967 he wrote a pamphlet, The Christian and Sport.

After the tour of England, India and Pakistan, which took five months from June to November 1969, Murray was glad to get back to his teaching job. He later reflected:

I saw what professional cricket could do to you as a person. You became much more self-centred, much more inward-looking, much too concerned about the wrong parts of the game, watching the averages. Not so team-oriented. I found the notion of professional sport to be a contradiction in terms. It isn't sport. It hardens people, makes them selfish and narrows their view of the world.

== After cricket ==
After his retirement from cricket, Murray continued his teaching career, teaching at Tawa College near Wellington, then at Naenae College in Lower Hutt, where he became principal in 1981, before becoming principal at Tawa College from 1989 to 2002. In the 2002 Queen's Birthday and Golden Jubilee Honours, he was appointed a Companion of the Queen's Service Order for public services.

Murray was also a writer. In the 1970s and 1980s he wrote or co-wrote a number of geography textbooks. After his retirement he wrote several books about the Tawa district.

Murray lived in Tawa from 1964. He and his wife Shona had three daughters and a son. His granddaughters Amelia Kerr and Jess Kerr have played international cricket for New Zealand; Amelia played in the 2017 Women's Cricket World Cup.

Murray served as president of Cricket Wellington from 2004 to 2008. Beginning with the 2008–09 season, the Bruce Murray Medal has been awarded annually for sportsmanship in Wellington club cricket.

Murray died in Wellington on 10 January 2023, at the age of 82. His funeral, lasting more than two hours, was held at Tawa College on 18 January 2023. With more than 500 people in attendance, the school hall overflowed into the courtyard outside. Refreshments were provided afterwards in the Tawa Intermediate school hall adjacent to Tawa College.

== Books ==
- Easter & Modern Issues (1972)
- Food and Population in Monsoon Asia (1976, with Michael Steer)
- New Zealand Population (1976, 1977, 1983, with Michael Steer)
- Japan: Agriculture and Industry (1977, with Michael Steer)
- India: Agriculture and Industry (1977, with Michael Steer)
- Relief and Climate of New Zealand (1977, with Michael Steer)
- A Resource Book of New Zealand Agriculture (1980, with Michael Steer)
- Population of North America (1981, with Michael Steer)
- The Streets of Tawa (2005)
- An Historical Atlas of Tawa (2006)
- Best of Tawa: Porirua, and They Who Settled It: First Published in the Canterbury Times, 11 March 1914 to 1 July 1914 by Elsdon Best (2007, edited, with David Wood)
- Rails through the Valley: The Story of the Construction and Use of the Railway Lines through Tawa (2008, with David Parsons)
- The Tawa Flat Cemetery: 1861–1978 (2009, with Richard Herbert)
- Arthur Carman's Suitcase: The Life and Times of Arthur Herbert Carman (2011, with David Wood)
- A History of Tawa (2014)
- The Tawa Memorial: Commemorating Those from the Tawa District Who Gave Their Lives in the Service of their Country and in the Cause of Peace (2017)
- Willowbank Reserve, Tawa, and its Environs (2018, with David Parsons)
- The Careys of Northamptonshire, England & Wellington, New Zealand (2018)
- The Mexteds of Pluckley, Kent and Tawa Flat, Wellington (2019)
- The Old Porirua Road (2021)
