= Noel Harford =

New Zealand cricketer

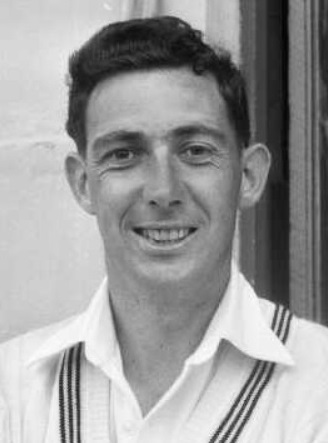
- Harford pictured in 1958

Personal information
- Born: 30 August 1930; Winton, New Zealand
- Died: 30 March 1981 (aged 50); Auckland, New Zealand
- Batting: Right-handed
- Bowling: Right-arm slow-medium

International information
- National side: New Zealand (1955–1958)
- Test debut (cap 74): 26 October 1955 v Pakistan
- Last Test: 24 July 1958 v England

Career statistics
Competition	Test	First-class
Matches	8	74
Runs scored	229	3,149
Batting average	15.26	27.62
100s/50s	0/2	3/18
Top score	93	158
Balls bowled	–	924
Wickets	–	18
Bowling average	–	26.55
5 wickets in innings	–	0
10 wickets in match	–	0
Best bowling	–	3/19
Catches/stumpings	0/–	39/–
- Source: Cricinfo, 1 April 2017

Noel Sherwin Harford (30 August 1930 – 30 March 1981) was a New Zealand cricketer who played eight Test matches in the 1950s. In domestic cricket he played for Central Districts from 1953 to 1959 and for Auckland from 1963 to 1967.

== Career ==
A neat right-handed batsman strong at driving and pulling but weak in defence and against spin, Harford came to prominence on the New Zealand tour to Pakistan and India in 1955–56, making his Test debut against Pakistan at Lahore, scoring 93 and 64. That debut, though, proved by some distance to be Harford's most successful Test appearance.

In England in the wet summer of 1958, Harford made his maiden first-class century against Oxford University, scoring 158, his highest first-class score, and sharing a partnership of 204 with his captain, John Reid in two hours and 10 minutes. He also scored 127 (a "brilliant century") against Glamorgan. However, in eight innings in four Test matches that season, he scored just 41 runs and reached double figures only once, a gritty innings of 23 at Edgbaston in which he had to retire for a period after being hit in the face by a bouncer from Fred Trueman.

Harford played no further Tests after the tour. His highest score in the Plunket Shield was 103 not out for Auckland against Central Districts in 1965–66. He played for Manawatu, Hawke's Bay and Franklin in the Hawke Cup between 1952 and 1971. He was not related to Roy Harford, who played for New Zealand in the 1960s. They played in the same Auckland team in 1965–66 and 1966–67.

Harford also played basketball for New Zealand in the 1950s.
