= Roy Harford =

New Zealand cricketer

- Harford in 1967

Personal information
- Full name: Roy Ivan Harford
- Born: 30 May 1936 (age 90); Fulham, London, England
- Batting: Left-handed
- Role: Wicket-keeper

International information
- National side: New Zealand (1968)
- Test debut (cap 113): 15 February 1968 v India
- Last Test: 29 February 1968 v India

Domestic team information
- Years: Team
- 1965/66–1967/68: Auckland

Career statistics
| Competition | Test | First-class |
|---|---|---|
| Matches | 3 | 25 |
| Runs scored | 7 | 143 |
| Batting average | 2.33 | 8.41 |
| 100s/50s | 0/0 | 0/0 |
| Top score | 6 | 23 |
| Catches/stumpings | 11/0 | 60/8 |
- Source: Cricinfo, 1 April 2017

Roy Ivan Harford (born 30 May 1936) is a former New Zealand cricketer who played in three Test matches against India during the 1967–68 season. He played first-class cricket in New Zealand from the 1965–66 season to the 1967–68 season.

== Cricket career ==
Born in London, Harford was a wicket-keeper who played club cricket for Mitcham in Surrey before emigrating to New Zealand in 1961. He represented Bay of Plenty in the Hawke Cup in 1962–63 and 1963–64 before moving to Auckland, where he was selected to play Plunket Shield cricket for Auckland in 1965–66.

Harford played all four representative matches for New Zealand against the Australian team in 1966–67, and toured Australia on the brief non-Test tour of 1967–68 as the only keeper. He then played the first three Tests in the home series against India. In the Third Test he became the first New Zealand wicket-keeper to take five catches in a Test innings; he also conceded no byes in the match. However, he was replaced by John Ward for the Fourth Test. His three Tests were his last first-class matches.

Although he was a competent keeper, who played 13 of his 25 first-class matches for the national team, Harford's left-handed batting was so unproductive that, unusually for a wicket-keeper at any level of the game, he usually batted at number 11. He made his top first-class score of 23 for Auckland against Otago in January 1967 when, batting at number 10, he added 75 for the ninth wicket with Bob Cunis after Auckland had been 165 for 8.

He was not related to Noel Harford, who played for New Zealand in the 1950s. Both played in the Auckland team in 1965–66 and 1966–67.
