= Barry Ward (cricketer) =

New Zealand cricketer (born 1961)

Personal information
- Born: 28 September 1961 (age 65); Timaru, New Zealand
- Relatives: John Ward (father)
- Source: Cricinfo, 22 October 2020

Barry Ward (born 28 September 1961) is a New Zealand cricketer. He played in eight first-class and five List A matches for Canterbury in 1986/87. His father, John Ward, kept wicket for New Zealand in the 1960s.

== See also ==
- List of Canterbury representative cricketers
