= Keith Thomson (sportsman) =

New Zealand sportsman (1941–2023)

Personal information
- Born: 26 February 1941; Methven, New Zealand
- Died: 26 January 2023 (aged 81); Christchurch, New Zealand
- Batting: Right-handed
- Bowling: Right-arm medium
- Relatives: Bill Thomson (brother)

International information
- National side: New Zealand (1968)
- Test debut: 22 February 1968 v India
- Last Test: 29 February 1968 v India

Domestic team information
- Years: Team
- 1959/60–1974/75: Canterbury

Career statistics
Competition	Test	FC	LA
Matches	2	71	3
Runs scored	94	3134	40
Batting average	31.33	28.23	13.33
100s/50s	0/1	5/15	0/0
Top score	69	136*	26
Balls bowled	21	511	48
Wickets	1	5	1
Bowling average	9.00	49.20	22.00
5 wickets in innings	0	0	0
10 wickets in match	0	0	0
Best bowling	1/9	1/9	1/7
Catches/stumpings	0/–	35/–	0/–
- Source: Cricinfo, 22 May 2023

Keith Thomson (26 February 1941 – 26 January 2023) was a New Zealand sportsman who represented his country at both cricket and hockey. He played two cricket Test matches in 1968, and 28 hockey Tests between 1961 and 1971, and was later an umpire in both sports.

== Cricket career ==
A middle-order batsman, Thomson was stoutly built and batted with a crouching stance, but hit the ball hard. He played first-class cricket for Canterbury from 1959–60 to 1973–74. In the Plunket Shield in 1966–67 he hit two centuries and was selected for all four matches for New Zealand against the touring Australian XI.

Thomson made his Test debut against India in the 1967–68 season at Christchurch where he scored 69 (adding 119 for the fifth wicket with Graham Dowling) and 0 not out in what was New Zealand's fourth victory in Tests. His second, and final, Test came a week later at Wellington where he scored 25 and 0.

His highest score in first-class cricket was 136 not out for Canterbury against Northern Districts in 1968–69. He was a fine fieldsman, a good catcher close to the wicket.

Thomson later became an umpire, standing in 13 first-class matches and 11 List A matches between 1983–84 and 1986–87.

== Hockey career ==
Thomson played hockey for Canterbury from 1959 to 1974 mainly as centre half or inside right. He made his debut for New Zealand in 1961 against India at Lancaster Park, Christchurch. Between 1961 and 1971 he represented New Zealand in 28 hockey Tests. At the 1968 Olympics in Mexico City, he played in eight games and scored three goals – one each against India, East Germany and Belgium, as New Zealand finished seventh.

Thomson was a New Zealand graded hockey umpire and umpired two international matches involving Canada and India. He was awarded life memberships of the Canterbury Hockey Association and the New Zealand Hockey Association.

== Later life and death ==
Thomson worked as a secondary school teacher. He taught at Amuri Area School, Hagley High School, Makora College (in Masterton) and Christchurch Boys' High School.

Thomson died in Christchurch on 26 January 2023, at the age of 81.
