= Rusi Surti =

Indian cricketer

Personal information
- Full name: Rusi Framroze Surti
- Born: 25 May 1936; Surat, Bombay Presidency, British India (Present day Gujarat, India)
- Died: 13 January 2013 (aged 76); Mumbai, Maharashtra, India
- Batting: Left-handed
- Bowling: Left-arm medium

International information
- National side: India
- Test debut (cap 99): 2 December 1960 v Pakistan
- Last Test: 4 November 1969 v Australia

Domestic team information
- Years: Team
- 1956/57–1967/68: Gujarat
- 1959/60–1960/61: Rajasthan
- 1968/69–1972/73: Queensland

Career statistics
Competition	Test	First-class
Matches	26	160
Runs scored	1,263	8,066
Batting average	28.70	30.90
100s/50s	0/9	6/53
Top score	99	246*
Balls bowled	3,870	19,515
Wickets	42	284
Bowling average	46.71	37.07
5 wickets in innings	1	10
10 wickets in match	0	0
Best bowling	5/74	5/42
Catches/stumpings	26/–	122/–
- Source: CricketArchive, 13 January 2013

Rusi Framroze Surti ( 25 May 1936 – 13 January 2013) was an Indian cricketer who played in 26 Tests from 1960 to 1969. He was a left-arm medium pace and left-arm spin bowler and a lower-order batsman. Surti was also a popular professional for Haslingden in the Lancashire League in 1959. He belonged to the Parsi community.

After an uneventful Test debut against Pakistan at Bombay, Surti impressed in his second Test match with an innings of 64 at New Delhi. He had been promoted up the order to number 3. India toured the West Indies in 1962 and Surti made 246 runs in the series. In 1967/68 they toured Australia and New Zealand, and after various first-class fixtures and the Tests, he made 967 runs at 37.19 and took 42 wickets. In the Tests, he made 688 runs at an average of 45.50 with 22 wickets. At Auckland, he was dismissed for his highest Test score of 99. He was the first Indian player to score a fifty and take five wickets in the same Test match against Australia.

In the Ranji Trophy, he played for Rajasthan and Gujarat, with his highest score being 246 not out for Rajasthan against Uttar Pradesh in 1959/60. Surti later played for Queensland in the Sheffield Shield, Australia's domestic first-class competition. He became the first and only Indian Test player to play in the Sheffield Shield. When he retired, Surti decided to become an Australian and stayed in Queensland, working as a cricket coach for another 35 years.

In 2013, while on a routine trip to Mumbai, Surti had a stroke and Indian cricket's original braveheart died, aged 76.
