= Prof Edwards =

Barbadian cricketer (born 1940)

Personal information
- Full name: Richard Martin Edwards
- Born: 3 June 1940 (age 86); Christ Church, Barbados
- Batting: Right-handed
- Bowling: Right-arm fast

International information
- National side: West Indies
- Test debut: 26 December 1968 v Australia
- Last Test: 13 March 1969 v New Zealand

Career statistics
Competition	Test	First-class
Matches	5	35
Runs scored	65	389
Batting average	9.28	11.78
100s/50s	0/0	0/0
Top score	22	34
Balls bowled	1,311	5,469
Wickets	18	78
Bowling average	34.77	36.29
5 wickets in innings	1	3
10 wickets in match	0	0
Best bowling	5/84	6/45
Catches/stumpings	0/–	15/–
- Source: CricInfo, 10 June 2022

Richard Martin "Prof" Edwards (born 3 June 1940) is a former cricketer. He played five Test matches as an opening bowler for the West Indies on the tour of Australia and New Zealand in 1968–69.

After leaving The Lodge School in Barbados, he played for Barbados between 1961–62 and 1969–70. Altogether he played 35 first-class matches in his career. His best bowling figures were 6 for 45 for Barbados against Leeward Islands in 1966/67.

He holds the record for the greatest number of runs scored off an eight-ball over with 34 (4, 0, 4, 4, 6, 6, 6, 4) bowled by Joey Carew, Governor-General's XI v West Indians at Auckland, 1968–69.

He later worked as the groundsman at Kensington Oval in Bridgetown.
