= Dennis Copps =

New Zealand cricket umpire (1929–2020)

Personal information
- Full name: Dennis Edward Arthur Copps
- Born: 22 March 1929; Wandsworth, London, England
- Died: 22 April 2020 (aged 91); Wellington, New Zealand

Umpiring information
- Tests umpired: 13 (1965–1977)
- Source: Cricinfo, 1 May 2020

Dennis Edward Arthur Copps (22 March 1929 – 22 April 2020) was a New Zealand cricket umpire. He stood in 13 Test matches between 1965 and 1977, and altogether in 36 first-class matches in New Zealand between 1961 and 1977.

Copps was born in London. He married Christine Rattee in 1954, and they emigrated to New Zealand in 1956. After living for some time in New Plymouth, they moved to Wellington. He joined the Department of Customs in 1961, and rose to become the director of Administration and General Services. He retired to the Kāpiti Coast in 1987.

Copps umpired the first List A match in New Zealand, partnered by Trevor Martin. It was a match of 40 eight-ball overs a side, between Wellington and the touring MCC at the Basin Reserve in February 1971.

== See also ==
- List of Test cricket umpires
