= Lindsay Sparks =

New Zealand cricketer (1944–2025)

Personal information
- Full name: Lindsay Charles Sparks
- Born: 5 December 1944; Waikari, Canterbury, New Zealand
- Died: 18 August 2025 (aged 80); Christchurch, New Zealand
- Batting: Right-handed
- Bowling: Right-arm medium

Domestic team information
- Years: Team
- 1965/66–1971/72: Marlborough
- 1967/68–1970/71: Central Districts
- 1977/78: Auckland

Career statistics
Competition	First-class	List A
Matches	9	2
Runs scored	109	–
Batting average	10.90	–
100s/50s	0/0	–
Top score	21	–
Balls bowled	1,110	101
Wickets	18	1
Bowling average	24.72	85.00
5 wickets in innings	1	0
10 wickets in match	0	0
Best bowling	6/46	1/44
Catches/stumpings	4/–	1/–
- Source: Cricinfo, 23 August 2025

Lindsay Charles Sparks, usually known as Lin or Lyn, (5 December 1944 – 18 August 2025) was a New Zealand cricketer and rugby union player. He played first-class and List A cricket for Central Districts and Auckland in the late 1960s and 1970s, and rugby union for Marlborough, Air Force and Combined Services between 1962 and 1974.

After several successful matches for Marlborough in the Hawke Cup, including seven wickets in the match in January 1968 in which Marlborough gained the Cup for the first time, Sparks made his first-class debut for Central Districts against the touring Indians in February 1968, taking 4/63 in what was nevertheless an innings defeat. His best first-class figures were 6/46 against Canterbury in January 1970.

Sparks' last two games in senior cricket were the only List A matches in which he appeared. In March 1971 he played against MCC at Fitzherbert Park in Palmerston North, taking the wicket of John Edrich. After a gap of more than six years, in November 1977 he made a solitary appearance for Auckland in the Gillette Cup.

In rugby Sparks made 23 appearances for Marlborough as a goal-kicking fullback, first five-eighth, or centre. He played in Marlborough's victory over the French touring team in 1968 and against the British Lions in 1971.

Sparks died in Christchurch on 18 August 2025, at the age of 80.
