= Ken Wadsworth =

New Zealand cricketer (1946–1976)

- Ken Wadsworth appeals

Personal information
- Full name: Kenneth John Wadsworth
- Born: 30 November 1946; Nelson, New Zealand
- Died: 19 August 1976 (aged 29); Nelson, New Zealand
- Batting: Right-handed
- Role: Wicket-keeper

International information
- National side: New Zealand (1969–1976)
- Test debut (cap 121): 24 July 1969 v England
- Last Test: 13 February 1976 v India
- ODI debut (cap 11): 11 February 1973 v Pakistan
- Last ODI: 22 February 1976 v India

Career statistics
Competition	Test	ODI	FC	LA
Matches	33	13	118	30
Runs scored	1,010	258	3,664	603
Batting average	21.48	28.66	25.62	30.15
100s/50s	0/5	1/0	2/5	1/2
Top score	80	104	117	104
Catches/stumpings	92/4	13/2	265/26	39/6
- Source: Cricinfo, 4 April 2017

Kenneth John Wadsworth (30 November 1946 – 19 August 1976) was a New Zealand cricketer who played 33 Tests and 13 One Day Internationals for New Zealand as a wicket-keeper. Wadsworth played domestically for Central Districts and Canterbury and for Nelson in the Hawke Cup.

== Domestic career ==
Wadsworth scored over 1,000 runs and dismissed nearly 100 batsmen as New Zealand's regular wicket-keeper between 1969–1970 and 1975–1976. He toured England in 1969 and 1973. From the outset, he was always a talented wicket-keeper and over time he also developed greater consistency. An aggressive batsman, whose impetuosity often cost him his wicket, he could also defend stubbornly when the situation demanded.

He made his first-class debut for Central Districts against Wellington as a batsman in a Plunket Shield match at Basin Reserve in December 1968 aged 22. Two months later he made his maiden first-class century for South Island at Dunedin against the touring West Indian team, also keeping wicket for the first time at that level.

== International career ==
Wadsworth was subsequently selected for the 1969 tour to England and made his Test debut in the first Test at Lord's. Owing to his superior batting potential he was selected ahead of incumbent keeper Barry Milburn, who had been first choice during the earlier home Test series against the West Indies. In the early days of his Test career Wadsworth's wicketkeeping seemed to weigh heavily on his batting and, after as many as 11 Tests, his batting average was no more than 7.00. By the time the New Zealanders got to the Caribbean for their 1971/72 series there must have been some doubt as to whether he would in fact take his place in the Test team for a series which the cricket world expected New Zealand to lose. In the event New Zealand cricket came of age that season. The five Tests all failed to produce a definite result, and the visitors exhibited an unexpected degree of talent and determination. In the first Test at Kingston, Jamaica, he joined Glen Turner at 108 for 5 and together they put on 220 for the 6th wicket, which remained the highest New Zealand partnership for that wicket for 15 years.

His highest Test innings was 80 against Australia at Melbourne in 1974 and in the same season he made a century against them in a One Day International at Christchurch. Thereafter he never looked back and averaged 26.62 over the next 17 Tests. In 1974 he struck the winning runs in New Zealand's first Test victory over Australia.

Wadsworth held the record with Bevan Congdon for the highest sixth-wicket partnership in ODIs for New Zealand against all countries with 130 runs at Christchurch in 1973–74 against Australia. This record was only broken in February 2007 by Craig McMillan and Brendon McCullum when they scored 165, also against Australia. Wadsworth scored the first One Day International hundred for New Zealand and also became the first wicketkeeper to score an ODI century, in the sixth match ever played.

== Death ==
In March 1976, Wadsworth played his last first-class match for Canterbury, scoring 117 in the first innings of the Shell Trophy final against Otago, an innings that was instrumental in Canterbury's nine-wicket win. Just five months later he died from a sudden, aggressive and invasive melanoma at the age of just 29. A 35-over Ken Wadsworth memorial match between a New Zealand Invitation XI and an Australian XI was played at Christchurch on 30 January 1977.
