= Ross Morgan =

New Zealand cricketer

Personal information
- Full name: Ross Winston Morgan
- Born: 12 February 1941 (age 85); Auckland, New Zealand
- Batting: Right-handed
- Bowling: Right-arm offbreak

International information
- National side: New Zealand (1965–1972)
- Test debut (cap 104): 29 January 1965 v Pakistan
- Last Test: 20 April 1972 v West Indies

Domestic team information
- Years: Team
- 1957/58–1976/77: Auckland

Career statistics
Competition	Test	First-class
Matches	20	136
Runs scored	734	5940
Batting average	22.24	27.50
100s/50s	0/5	8/32
Top score	97	166
Balls bowled	1,114	8339
Wickets	5	108
Bowling average	121.79	32.94
5 wickets in innings	0	4
10 wickets in match	0	0
Best bowling	1/16	6/40
Catches/stumpings	12/–	85/1
- Source: Cricinfo, 1 April 2017

Ross Winston Morgan (born 12 February 1941) is a former New Zealand cricketer who played 20 Tests for New Zealand between 1965 and 1972 as a middle-order batsman and off-spinner.

== Domestic career ==
Morgan was only 16 when he made his first-class debut for Auckland in 1957–58. Good all-round form in the Plunket Shield in 1964–65, including 6 for 40 against Central Districts (which remained the best figures of his career), and 112 not out against Wellington a few days later, led to his selection in the Test team.

He continued playing for Auckland until 1976–77. His highest first-class score was 166 for Auckland against Canterbury at Auckland in 1968–69, out of a total of 314 for 8 declared.

He played senior club cricket for Parnell in Auckland for more than 30 years, establishing club records which have yet to be broken: most runs (16,028) and most wickets (692).

== International career ==
Coming into the Test team when John Sparling withdrew from the selected side, Morgan scored 66 on his debut against Pakistan in the Second Test in Auckland in 1964–65, which was the top score on either side in the match. In the next match of the series in Christchurch he scored 97, which was once again New Zealand's top score for the match. He remained in the Test side for the three series in India, Pakistan and England that followed in the next few months, playing some valuable innings and taking occasional wickets with his off-spin, accumulating 663 runs at an average of 30.13 in his first 12 Tests.

Thereafter, however, his Test form deserted him and his final eight Tests over the next seven years yielded only 71 runs. He played his last three Tests in New Zealand's tour of the West Indies in 1972, as a replacement for Richard Collinge, who had to return to New Zealand due to the death of his infant child. In these three Tests Morgan made only eight runs and took one wicket.

== See also ==
- List of Auckland representative cricketers
