= Salahuddin (cricketer) =

Pakistani cricketer (born 1947)

Personal information
- Full name: Salahuddin Mulla
- Born: 14 February 1947 (age 79); Aligarh, British India (now India)
- Nickname: Salu
- Batting: Right-handed
- Bowling: Right-arm offbreak

International information
- National side: Pakistan
- Test debut (cap 52): 27 March 1965 v New Zealand
- Last Test: 30 October 1969 v New Zealand

Career statistics
Competition	Tests	First-class
Matches	5	111
Runs scored	117	5729
Batting average	19.50	41.21
100s/50s	0/0	14/26
Top score	34*	256
Balls bowled	546	4410
Wickets	7	155
Bowling average	26.71	28.78
5 wickets in innings	0	4
10 wickets in match	0	0
Best bowling	2/36	6/76
Catches/stumpings	3/-	65/-
- Source: ESPNCricinfo, 15 June 2017

Salahuddin (born 14 February 1947, Aligarh, India; commonly known as Salahuddin Sallu) is a former Pakistani cricketer who played in five Tests from 1965 to 1969.

Salahuddin has previously served as a chief selector of Pakistan national cricket team.

== Bibliography ==
- Sallu: An Autobiography
