= Bill Dow (cricketer) =

Scottish cricketer (1933–2026)

Personal information
- Full name: William David Fraser Dow
- Born: 27 November 1933; Glasgow, Scotland
- Died: 7 July 2026 (aged 92); Killearn, Scotland
- Batting: Right-handed
- Bowling: Right-arm fast-medium

Career statistics
Competition	First-class
Matches	13
Runs scored	107
Batting average	8.91
100s/50s	0/0
Top score	18
Balls bowled	2,144
Wickets	38
Bowling average	26.71
5 wickets in innings	2
10 wickets in match	1
Best bowling	6/56
Catches/stumpings	2/–
- Source: ESPNCricinfo, 16 April 2023

William David Fraser Dow (27 November 1933 – 7 July 2026) was a Scottish cricketer. A right arm paceman, he took 34 wickets for Scotland.

== Biography ==
Dow was born at Glasgow on 27 November 1933. He played a County Championship game for Essex against Kent during the 1959 season but went wicketless. For his club side Clydesdale he managed 1393 runs and 245 wickets. Dow died in Killearn on 7 July 2026, aged 92.
