= Trevor Martin (umpire) =

New Zealand cricket umpire (1925–2017)

Trevor Martin MBE
Personal information
- Full name: William Trevor Martin
- Born: 19 February 1925
- Died: 4 August 2017 (aged 92)
- Role: Umpire

Umpiring information
- Tests umpired: 15 (1963–1973)
- Source: Cricinfo, 7 July 2013

William Trevor Martin MBE (19 February 1925 – 4 August 2017) was a New Zealand Test cricket umpire.

== Early life and family ==
Born in Nelson on 19 February 1925, Martin was educated at Nelson College from 1939 to 1940. In 1951, he married Ngaire Dawn Wilmshurst in Nelson.

== Cricket umpiring career ==
Martin was an umpire in first-class cricket from December 1958 to January 1978. A substantial majority of his first-class matches as umpire were played at Wellington's Basin Reserve. He also umpired six List A one-day matches. He stood in 15 Test matches between 1963 and 1973. All of the Test matches he umpired were played in New Zealand.

He made his debut as a Test umpire in the 2nd Test between New Zealand and England at the Basin Reserve in Wellington in March 1963, standing with Douglas Dumbleton. In that match, the unbeaten partnership of 163 between Colin Cowdrey (128*, coming in down the batting order at number 8) and Alan Smith (69*) for the ninth wicket in England's first innings set a world record which stood until 1967, when Pakistan's Asif Iqbal and Intikhab Alam reached 190 for the ninth wicket. Cowdrey and Smith's ninth-wicket partnership remains a record for England. Later that month, he umpired the 3rd Test between New Zealand and England, at Lancaster Park in Christchurch, where Fred Trueman took his 243rd Test wicket, passing Brian Statham's world record (Statham played three further Tests in 1963 and 1965, taking another 10 wickets, but did not pass Trueman's new record).

Martin also umpired the 1st Test against South Africa at Wellington in February 1964 which was disrupted by damage to the pitch caused by anti-apartheid demonstrators.

He umpired the first List A match in New Zealand, partnered by Dennis Copps. It was a match of 40 eight-ball overs a side, between Wellington and the touring MCC at the Basin Reserve in February 1971.

He and Tony Mackintosh both stood in their last Test as umpire in the 3rd Test between New Zealand and Pakistan at Eden Park in Auckland in February 1973. The tenth wicket partnership of 151 between Brian Hastings (110) and Richard Collinge (68*) in New Zealand's first innings was a world record until 2013. New Zealand opening batsman Rodney Redmond scored 107 and 56; this was to be the only Test match in which he was to play, leaving him with a Test batting average of 81.50.

In the 1978 New Year Honours, Martin was appointed a Member of the Order of the British Empire, for services to cricket.

== Death ==
Martin died in Tauranga on 4 August 2017.
