= Tony Mackintosh =

New Zealand cricket umpire (1931–2022)

Personal information
- Full name: Edward Charles Anthony Mackintosh
- Born: 28 December 1931; Devonport, Auckland, New Zealand
- Died: 3 January 2022 (aged 90); Rosebud, Victoria, Australia

Umpiring information
- Tests umpired: 8 (1964–1973)
- Source: Cricinfo, 10 July 2013

Edward Charles Anthony Mackintosh (28 December 1931 – 3 January 2022) was a New Zealand cricket umpire. He stood in eight Test matches between 1964 and 1973. He umpired 32 first-class matches, most of them in Auckland or Hamilton, between 1958 and 1973.

== See also ==
- List of Test cricket umpires
