= Bryan Yuile =

New Zealand cricketer

Personal information
- Full name: Bryan William Yuile
- Born: 29 October 1941 (age 85); Palmerston North, New Zealand
- Batting: Right-handed
- Bowling: Slow left-arm orthodox
- Role: All-rounder

International information
- National side: New Zealand (1963–1969)
- Test debut (cap 95): 23 February 1963 v England
- Last Test: 30 October 1969 v Pakistan

Domestic team information
- Years: Team
- 1959/60–1971/72: Central Districts

Career statistics
Competition	Test	FC	LA
Matches	17	123	1
Runs scored	481	3,850	2
Batting average	17.81	24.67	2.00
100s/50s	0/1	1/22	0/0
Top score	64	146	2
Balls bowled	2,897	24,515	64
Wickets	34	375	2
Bowling average	35.67	21.89	28.50
5 wickets in innings	0	17	0
10 wickets in match	0	2	0
Best bowling	4/43	9/100	2/57
Catches/stumpings	12/–	73/–	2/–
- Source: Cricinfo, 1 April 2017

Bryan William Yuile (born 29 October 1941) is a former cricketer who played 17 Test matches for New Zealand in the 1960s. He played first-class cricket from 1959 to 1972, until his religious objection to playing on Sundays led to the end of his career.

== Career ==
Yuile went to school at Palmerston North Boys' High School. He was a left-arm spin bowler and middle-to-lower-order batsman. He played for Central Districts from 1959–60 to 1971–72, and toured South Africa in 1961–62 and England, India and Pakistan in 1965 and 1969 with the New Zealand team.

In 1962–63, he took 7 wickets for 36 runs against Otago. He made his Test debut against England in the First Test in Auckland later that season, taking the wicket of Ted Dexter and top-scoring for New Zealand with 64 in the first innings, which remained his highest Test score. His best Test bowling figures came in the Second Test against Pakistan in Auckland in 1964–65, when he dismissed four of the first five batsmen and finished with 4 for 43 off 54 overs.

In 1965–66 he took 9 for 100 for Central Districts against Canterbury. The previous season he had taken 3 for 33 and 7 for 54 against Northern Districts. His highest first-class score and only century was 146 against Canterbury in 1967–68 (he also took 6 for 68 and 1 for 13 in the same match).

In 1966–67 in the four-match series against the visiting Australians he took 15 wickets at 22.13 and made 162 runs at 40.50. In the first match, when New Zealand beat an Australian team for the first time, he took 5 for 62 and 2 for 57 (match figures of 69–34–119–7) and made 38 and 5 not out.

In 1969 he headed the batting averages on the New Zealand tour of England with 383 runs at 63.83, but was not selected for any of the Tests, in which Hedley Howarth carried the spin attack.

Along with his teammates on the 1969 tour Bruce Murray and Vic Pollard he would not play cricket on Sundays for religious reasons. With the introduction of Sunday play in the late 1960s and early 1970s, his career was consequently curtailed.

He worked as a social worker in Wairoa in the Hawke's Bay Region.
