= Dick Shortt =

New Zealand cricket umpire (1922–1994)

Personal information
- Full name: Richard William Robert Shortt
- Born: 12 March 1922; England
- Died: 17 August 1994 (aged 72); Auckland, New Zealand

Umpiring information
- Tests umpired: 9 (1959–1973)
- Source: ESPNcricinfo, 16 July 2013

Richard William Robert Shortt (22 March 1922 – 17 August 1994) was a New Zealand cricket umpire. He stood in nine Test matches between 1959 and 1973.
