= Barry Sinclair =

New Zealand cricketer (1936–2022)

Barry Sinclair MNZM
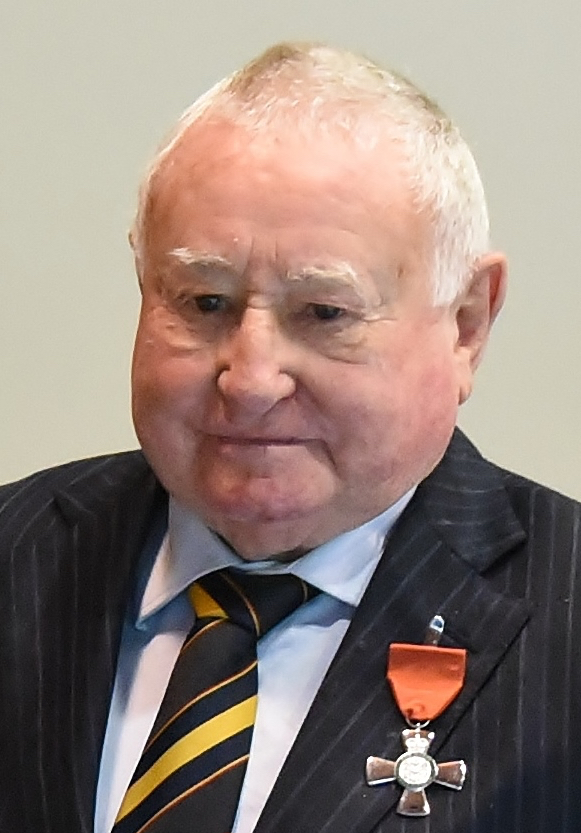
- Sinclair in 2016

Personal information
- Full name: Barry Whitley Sinclair
- Born: 23 October 1936; Wellington, New Zealand
- Died: 10 July 2022 (aged 85)
- Height: 5 ft 3 in (160 cm)
- Batting: Right-handed
- Bowling: Right-arm

International information
- National side: New Zealand (1963–1968)
- Test debut (cap 94): 23 February 1963 v England
- Last Test: 7 March 1968 v India

Domestic team information
- Years: Team
- 1955/56–1970/71: Wellington

Career statistics
Competition	Test	FC	LA
Matches	21	118	5
Runs scored	1,148	6,114	118
Batting average	29.43	32.87	29.50
100s/50s	3/3	6/38	0/0
Top score	138	148	48
Balls bowled	60	245	0
Wickets	2	2	–
Bowling average	16.00	43.00	–
5 wickets in innings	0	0	–
10 wickets in match	0	0	–
Best bowling	2/32	2/32	–
Catches/stumpings	8/–	45/–	0/–
- Source: Cricinfo, 1 April 2017

Barry Whitley Sinclair MNZM (23 October 1936 – 10 July 2022) was a New Zealand cricketer. He played 21 Test matches for New Zealand national team as a specialist batsman from 1962–63 to 1967–68, and captained the team from 1966 to 1968.

== Early life ==
Sinclair was born in Wellington on 23 October 1936. He attended Rongotai College in his hometown. He was first selected to play for Wellington when he was eighteen.

== Domestic career ==
Sinclair played for Wellington from 1955–56 to 1970–71. His first century came against Northern Districts in 1963–64, when he made 102 not out, out of a team total of 138 for 5, to take Wellington to a five-wicket victory almost single-handedly. His highest first-class score was 148, captaining Wellington against the Australians in 1966–67, out of a total of 365 for 7 on the first day.

== International career ==
Sinclair scored three of his six first-class centuries in Tests, though never played in a winning Test side. He captained New Zealand in three Tests (the Second and Third Tests against England in 1965–66, and the First Test against India in 1967–68) and also in the four-match series against the visiting Australian team in 1966–67 and on the brief tour to Australia in 1967–68. He retired from international cricket in 1968 to concentrate on work.

Sinclair's highest Test score was 138 against South Africa in Auckland in 1963–64, made in 345 minutes out of a team total of only 263. It was the only century by either side in the three-Test series; at the time, it was the highest Test score ever attained by a New Zealander in New Zealand. He took two Test wickets in ten overs, both against Pakistan in Lahore in 1964–65, after scoring 130 in the first innings.

Sinclair's short stature was sometimes exploited by pace bowlers. However, he learned how to handle short-pitched deliveries. He was a neat, tidy batsman notable for his cutting and on-drives. Christopher Martin-Jenkins described him thus: "Fair-haired and one of the smallest cricketers ever to appear [for] New Zealand, Barry Sinclair was a sound and often fluent right-handed batsman with an indomitable spirit and an excellent field at cover."

== Later life ==
Sinclair was made the inaugural patron of the New Zealand Cricket Players’ Association in 2010. Five years later, he was voted a Legend of Wellington Sport. In the 2016 Queen's Birthday Honours, Sinclair was appointed a Member of the New Zealand Order of Merit for services to cricket.

Sinclair died on 10 July 2022 aged 85.

Sporting positions
Preceded by Murray Chapple	New Zealand national cricket captain 1966–68	Succeeded by Graham Dowling
