= Dick Motz =

New Zealand cricketer

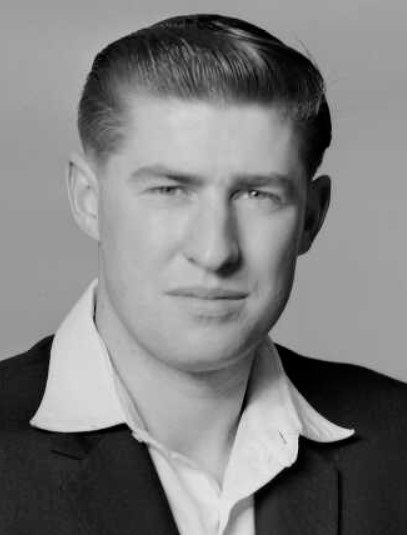
- Motz in 1961

Personal information
- Full name: Richard Charles Motz
- Born: 12 January 1940; Christchurch, New Zealand
- Died: 29 April 2007 (aged 67); Christchurch, New Zealand
- Batting: Right-handed
- Bowling: Right-arm fast

International information
- National side: New Zealand (1961–1969)
- Test debut (cap 92): 8 December 1961 v South Africa
- Last Test: 21 August 1969 v England

Career statistics
Competition	Test	First-class
Matches	32	142
Runs scored	612	3,494
Batting average	11.54	17.12
100s/50s	0/3	1/13
Top score	60	103*
Balls bowled	7,034	29,773
Wickets	100	518
Bowling average	31.48	22.71
5 wickets in innings	5	24
10 wickets in match	0	4
Best bowling	6/63	8/61
Catches/stumpings	9/–	41/–
- Source: Cricinfo, 1 April 2017

Richard Charles Motz (12 January 1940 – 29 April 2007) was a New Zealand cricketer. A right-arm fast bowler and hard-hitting lower order batsman, Motz played 32 Test matches for the New Zealand national cricket team between 1961 and 1969. He was the first bowler for New Zealand to take 100 wickets in Test cricket.

== Early life ==
Motz was born in Christchurch. He was educated at North New Brighton primary school and Linwood High School, excelling as an all-rounder at both. He also played rugby, tennis, badminton and golf. He played as full-back for the New Brighton rugby team for two years after leaving school.

== Domestic career ==
He played domestic cricket for Canterbury, making his debut in the Plunket Shield in 1957, while still a schoolboy, taking 4 for 40 at his first outing. He made his reputation as a hostile fast bowler, and a big-hitting lower order batsman.

His best first-class performances were in New Zealand domestic cricket. He took 8 wickets for 61 runs against Wellington in 1966–67, and scored 103 not out against Otago in 1967–68, making his only first-class century inside an hour. On tour to Australia in 1967–68, he scored 94 against South Australia, including 76 runs from boundaries (6 sixes and 10 fours).

== International career ==
He was one of five New Zealand players and seven South Africans to make their Test debut in the 1st Test at Durban in December 1961. He took 81 wickets on the tour, at a bowling average of 19, including 19 wickets in the five Tests.

He took five wickets in an innings five times in Tests, once in England and twice at home against each of India and West Indies. He was also a handy lower-order batsman, scoring three Test half-centuries, all at home against England.

In 1968, he was the first bowler to be banned from bowling in a Test due to running on the wicket. In his last Test, the third Test against England at The Oval in August 1969, Motz became the first New Zealand bowler to take 100 Test wickets when he trapped Phil Sharpe leg before wicket (his only wicket of the match).

Motz was a New Zealand Cricket Almanack Player of the Year in 1961, South African Cricket Annual Cricketer of the Year in 1962, and a Wisden Cricketer of the Year in 1966.

== After cricket ==
Motz's playing career ended at the age of 29, after he was found to have a displaced vertebra – indeed, he had been playing with a bad back for over a year. After his retirement from cricket, he became a taxi driver. He also ran a sports business, and then ran a pub in Timaru. In later years, he put on considerable weight, ending over 30 stone.

He was inducted to the New Zealand Sports Hall of Fame in 1997.

He was married twice. His first marriage, to cricketer Loretta Todd, ended in divorce in 1987. They had a son and two daughters. His son, Wayne, was murdered in 1989. He remarried, to Josephine Cole.

He died in Christchurch. He was found dead at his home by his former captain, Graham Dowling. He was survived by his two daughters from his first marriage.

A monograph titled 'Working Man's Hero' written by Bill Francis was published in 2022.
