= Richard Collinge =

New Zealand cricketer (born 1946)

Personal information
- Full name: Richard Owen Collinge
- Born: 2 April 1946 (age 80); Wellington, New Zealand
- Batting: Right-handed
- Bowling: Left-arm medium-fast
- Role: Bowler

International information
- National side: New Zealand (1965–1978)
- Test debut (cap 102): 22 January 1965 v Pakistan
- Last Test: 24 August 1978 v England
- ODI debut (cap 2): 11 February 1973 v Pakistan
- Last ODI: 17 July 1978 v England

Domestic team information
- Years: Team
- 1963/64–1969/70: Central Districts
- 1967/68–1974/75: Wellington
- 1975/76–1977/78: Northern Districts

Career statistics
Competition	Test	ODI	FC	LA
Matches	35	15	163	37
Runs scored	533	34	1,848	116
Batting average	14.40	5.66	14.43	9.66
100s/50s	0/2	0/0	0/4	0/0
Top score	68*	9	68*	38*
Balls bowled	7,689	859	31,388	2,038
Wickets	116	18	524	52
Bowling average	29.25	26.61	24.41	20.15
5 wickets in innings	3	1	22	2
10 wickets in match	0	0	4	0
Best bowling	6/63	5/23	8/64	5/23
Catches/stumpings	10/–	1/–	57/–	6/–
- Source: Cricinfo, 17 October 2016

Richard Owen Collinge (born 2 April 1946) is a former New Zealand cricketer, who played 35 Tests and 15 ODIs. He was a New Zealand Cricket Almanack Player of the Year in 1971.

== Domestic career ==
He played domestic cricket for three different sides. He made his first class debut for Central Districts in 1963/64 and played for them until 1969/70 before moving to Wellington from 1967/68 to 1974/75 and finally Northern Districts till 1977/78. In 163 first class matches he took 524 wickets, with a best of 8-64, at an average of 24.41.

== International career ==
A tall, strongly-built man, Collinge bowled left arm fast medium, ending his long run with both arms stretching upwards before delivering the ball. He pitched the ball up and relied on late movement. He was a good foil for the often wild express pace of the young Richard Hadlee and was instrumental in helping Hadlee bring New Zealand's first Test victory over England in 1977-8, with figures of 3-42 and 3-45. The fast inswinger with which he bowled Geoff Boycott at Wellington began England's collapse to 64 all out and brought the crowd to fever pitch.

He made his Test debut in 1965 and played his last match at Lord's in 1978. His best Test and One Day International bowling figures were both against India in 1975–76, with 6 for 63 and 5 for 23 respectively. At the time of his retirement, he was New Zealand's greatest wicket-taker, with 116 wickets at 29.25 each, despite missing many matches during his 13-year test career.

He could also be a useful batsman. At Auckland in 1972–73, Collinge scored 68 not out for New Zealand against Pakistan; this was the highest score ever made by a number 11 in a Test match at the time. That innings also formed part of the record last-wicket stand in Tests: 151 put on with Brian Hastings in 155 minutes.

A monograph titled Following in the Footsteps of 'Davo' written by Bill Francis was published in 2024.
