= Vic Pollard =

New Zealand cricketer and footballer

Cricket information
- Batting: Right-handed
- Bowling: Right-arm offbreak

International information
- National side: New Zealand (1965–1974)
- Test debut (cap 107): 27 February 1965 v India
- Last Test: 5 July 1973 v England
- ODI debut (cap 12): 18 July 1973 v England
- Last ODI: 30 March 1974 v Australia

Career statistics
Competition	Test	ODI	FC	LA
Matches	32	3	130	3
Runs scored	1,266	67	5,314	67
Batting average	24.34	33.50	30.54	33.50
100s/50s	2/7	0/1	6/30	0/1
Top score	116	55	146	55
Balls bowled	4,421	0	20,155	0
Wickets	40	–	224	–
Bowling average	46.32	–	30.94	–
5 wickets in innings	0	–	6	–
10 wickets in match	0	–	1	–
Best bowling	3/3	–	7/65	–
Catches/stumpings	19/–	1/–	81/–	1/–
- Source: Cricinfo, 1 April 2017

Vic Pollard
Personal information
- Full name: Vic Pollard
- Date of birth: 7 September 1945 (age 81)
- Place of birth: Burnley, England

Team information
- Current team: Coolum CC
- Number: 33

Senior career*
Years	Team	Apps	(Gls)
1968	Rangers AFC	16	(8)
1970–72	Christchurch United		

International career^{‡}
1968–1972	New Zealand	7	(0)
- * Club domestic league appearances and goals ‡ National team caps and goals as of 11:28, 12 May 2009 (UTC)

Victor Pollard (born 7 September 1945) is an English-born former Test and One-Day International cricketer and footballer who represented New Zealand at the international level in both sports.

== Early life ==
A native of Lancashire, his family emigrated to New Zealand in 1952. He was educated at Palmerston North Boys High School and Dux Ladorum but retained dual British and New Zealand nationality. A natural athlete, Pollard excelled at both cricket and football.

== Cricket career ==
He made his domestic debut for Central Districts Under-23 team at Wallara in the Rothman's Under 23 Tournament in January 1964 aged 18. He played alongside Ken Wadsworth who was also making his debut and they would later be teammates in both the New Zealand Test and Central Districts sides. He subsequently made his first class debut for the senior provincial side against Wellington in December 1964 at the age of 19.

He was fast tracked into the New Zealand Test side after only 6 first-class matches for the arduous tour of India and Pakistan in 1965. Making his debut in the first Test against India in Chennai, Pollard dismissed the Indian opening batsman, Dilip Sardesai, when he clean bowled him for 22 in his very first bowling spell. He went on to take 3 – 90 and a catch in the Indian first innings plus a wicket in their second innings. He played in all 4 Tests against India and 3 Tests against Pakistan, scoring 168 runs at 15.27 and taking 10 wickets at 60.50. Less than a month later he arrived in England for a 10-week tour, including 3 Tests, where he topped the New Zealand batting with 281 runs at 56.20.

His maiden first class century came in his 50th match on a tour to Australia in December 1967, 3 years after his debut, when he scored 125 in a drawn match against Queensland. His best first class bowling performance was 7 – 65 (match analysis 11 – 91) against an Australian touring side in March 1967 at New Plymouth. Appointed captain of Central Districts in 1967 when he was just 22, he led them to two Plunket Shield championships in two out of the next three seasons before moving to Canterbury in order to pursue his college teaching studies. He initially captained the Canterbury side until he missed a number of matches over the following two seasons due to his reluctance to play on a Sunday, because he was a lay preacher and playing on that day conflicted with his religious beliefs. This self-imposed restriction led him to forfeit any chance of the Test captaincy after he dropped out of the team to tour the West Indies in 1972 because several of the matches included Sunday play.

== The 1973 Test Series in England ==
New Zealand had never beaten England when they arrived for their 1973 tour which included 3 Tests. This proved to be a remarkable series despite England winning two Tests with the third match drawn. In the first Test at Trent Bridge New Zealand were set 479 to win in the fourth innings. At one point, at 402 for 5 with Pollard and Wadsworth having put on 95 runs for the sixth wicket together, they looked as though they would achieve a remarkable upset. However, when Wadsworth was dismissed for 46 runs by Geoff Arnold, the last 5 wickets fell for just 38 runs with Tony Greig running through the tail on the morning of the 5th day to give England victory by 38 runs. Pollard had a remarkable series. His scores in the 3 Tests were 16 not out, 116, 105 not out, 62 and 3 and he finished with an average of 100.66. Following this series he retired from Test cricket at the age of 29 and 18 months later he retired from first class cricket altogether, playing his last match against Auckland in the Plunket Shield competition in January 1975.

== Football career ==
Pollard made his full All Whites debut in a 5–0 win over Fiji on 17 September 1968 and ended his international playing career with 7 A-international caps to his credit, his final cap an appearance in a 1–3 loss to New Caledonia on 14 October 1972.

== Post Cricket ==
After retiring from cricket, he taught at Hillmorton High School and Middleton Grange School in Christchurch eventually becoming Vice Principal there. Some 25 years later he entered politics by joining the South Island-based Christian Heritage Party, where he was 3rd on their list of candidates. The party platform was "Family, Justice, Choice and less Government control." However, he failed to be elected and subsequently left the party a few years later following a scandal that resulted in the conviction and imprisonment of the party leader, Graham Capill.

== Personal ==
He is married with 5 children. He had both hips replaced in 2001.
