= Bevan Congdon =

New Zealand cricketer (1938–2018)

Bevan Congdon OBE

Personal information
- Full name: Bevan Ernest Congdon
- Born: 11 February 1938; Motueka, New Zealand
- Died: 10 February 2018 (aged 79); Auckland, New Zealand
- Batting: Right-handed
- Bowling: Right-arm medium
- Role: All-rounder

International information
- National side: New Zealand (1965–1978)
- Test debut (cap 103): 22 January 1965 v Pakistan
- Last Test: 24 August 1978 v England
- ODI debut (cap 4): 11 February 1973 v Pakistan
- Last ODI: 17 July 1978 v England

Domestic team information
- Years: Team
- 1960/61–1970/71: Central Districts
- 1971/72: Wellington
- 1972/73–1973/74: Otago
- 1974/75–1977/78: Canterbury

Career statistics
Competition	Test	ODI	FC	LA
Matches	61	11	241	40
Runs scored	3,448	338	13,101	1,269
Batting average	32.22	56.33	34.84	40.93
100s/50s	7/19	1/2	23/68	1/10
Top score	176	101	202*	101
Balls bowled	5,620	437	15,602	1,895
Wickets	59	7	204	41
Bowling average	36.50	41.00	30.02	26.51
5 wickets in innings	1	0	4	0
10 wickets in match	0	0	0	0
Best bowling	5/65	2/17	6/42	4/33
Catches/stumpings	44/–	0/–	201/–	12/–
- Source: Cricinfo, 21 April 2017

Bevan Ernest Congdon (11 February 1938 – 10 February 2018) was a New Zealand cricket all-rounder who played 61 Test matches and 11 One Day Internationals from 1965 to 1978, which included a two-year spell as captain.

== Captaincy ==
Congdon was captain of the New Zealand Test and ODI team from 1972 to 1974, and was the first New Zealand captain to record a victory over Australia. Congdon was principally a batsman but also became a useful medium-pace bowler midway through his career. The Test captaincy brought out his best cricket: before becoming captain he had played 31 Tests and scored 1,569 runs at an average of 26.59 and had taken 12 wickets, but during his 17 Tests as captain he scored 1,067 runs at 41.03 and took 33 wickets.

Congdon's finest moments in Tests included the tour of England in 1973 when he scored 176 at Trent Bridge and 175 at Lord's in successive Tests, and the determined foray by the Kiwis to the West Indies in 1972, when he took over the captaincy from Graham Dowling. In the Trent Bridge match, New Zealand chased 479 in the final innings, falling short by only 38 runs. At the time, this was a Test record for a highest score in the fourth innings to lose a match. The innings at Lord's contributed to New Zealand making 551, their highest score in Tests at the time.

In 1975, Congdon became the first New Zealand batsman to score an ODI century at Basin Reserve. The second one was scored by Kane Williamson, 43 years later, on 6 January 2018 against Pakistan.

Asked afterwards how he prepared for Test cricket in his remote, intemperate South Island hometown, he replied that net pitches in Motueka prepared one for anything.

== Honours ==
In the 1975 New Year Honours, Congdon was appointed an Officer of the Order of the British Empire, for services to cricket.

Sporting positions
Preceded by Graham Dowling	New Zealand national cricket captain 1971/72–1976/77	Succeeded by Glenn Turner
