= Graham Dowling =

New Zealand cricketer

Graham Dowling OBE
Personal information
- Full name: Graham Thorne Dowling
- Born: 4 March 1937 (age 89); Christchurch, New Zealand
- Batting: Right-handed
- Bowling: Right-arm medium

International information
- National side: New Zealand (1961–1972)
- Test debut (cap 93): 26 December 1961 v South Africa
- Last Test: 9 March 1972 v West Indies

Domestic team information
- Years: Team
- 1958/59–1971/72: Canterbury

Career statistics
Competition	Test	FC	LA
Matches	39	158	5
Runs scored	2,306	9,399	163
Batting average	31.16	34.94	32.60
100s/50s	3/11	16/44	0/1
Top score	239	239	87
Balls bowled	36	656	32
Wickets	1	9	0
Bowling average	19.00	42.00	–
5 wickets in innings	0	0	–
10 wickets in match	0	0	–
Best bowling	1/19	3/100	–
Catches/stumpings	23/–	111/–	2/–
- Source: Cricinfo, 1 April 2017

Graham Thorne Dowling OBE (born 4 March 1937) is a former cricketer who played 39 Test matches for New Zealand and captained the national team in 19 of those matches. He led New Zealand to its first victory in a Test series, against Pakistan in November 1969. He was a specialist right-handed batsman who usually opened the innings. After his playing career, he became an administrator.

== Domestic career ==
Dowling captained Canterbury from 1962–63 to 1971–72. He led Canterbury to victory in New Zealand's inaugural one-day competition in 1971–72, when he won the Man of the Match award in both the semi-final and the final.

== International career ==
Dowling captained the New Zealand Test team in 19 consecutive matches from 1968 to 1972. He led New Zealand to its first Test victories over India and Pakistan.

His finest moment came at Christchurch in 1967–68 when he made a nine-hour 239 that led to New Zealand's first victory against India. It was his first match as captain, and he was the only player to score a double century on his captaincy debut until the feat was equalled by Shivnarine Chanderpaul against South Africa in 2005. At the time, his 239 was the highest Test score for New Zealand. Nevertheless, New Zealand lost the two remaining Tests of the series to go down 1–3.

Dowling led New Zealand in 12 Tests in 1969, including three victories. They beat West Indies in Wellington in March, and shared the three-Test series 1–1. On a long nine-Test tour from June to November, they lost to England 0–2, shared the series with India 1–1, then beat Pakistan 1–0, New Zealand's first victory in a Test series.

He lost the middle finger of his left hand in 1970 after suffering an injury on the brief tour to Australia in 1969–70. On the tour to the West Indies in 1971–72 he suffered a back injury and had to return home after the Second Test. It was his last first-class match.

== After cricket ==
Dowling was a partner in an accounting firm, which enabled him to arrange his work around his absences playing cricket.

Dowling was CEO of New Zealand Cricket. In the 1987 New Year Honours, he was appointed an Officer of the Order of the British Empire, for services to cricket. He was also an ICC match referee from 1995 to 2008, officiating in nine Tests and 16 one-day international matches.

Sporting positions
Preceded by Barry Sinclair	New Zealand national cricket captain 1967/8-1971/2	Succeeded by Bevan Congdon
