= New Zealand cricket team in South Africa in 1961–62 =

International cricket tour

New Zealand cricket team in South Africa in 1961–62 (Note: The New Zealand team also played matches in Australia at the beginning and end of the tour as well as one match in New Zealand on their return to the country.)
	South Africa	New Zealand
- Dates: 12 October 1961 – 12 March 1962
Captains	DJ McGlew	JR Reid

Test series
- Result: 5-match series drawn 2–2
Most runs	DJ McGlew (426)	JR Reid (546)
Most wickets	GB Lawrence (28)	JC Alabaster (22)

The New Zealand national cricket team toured South Africa from October 1961 to February 1962 and played a five-match Test series against the South Africa national cricket team. The series was drawn 2–2, with New Zealand's victory in the third Test the team's first Test match win outside their home country. New Zealand captain John Reid scored a total of 1,915 runs during the tour, setting a record for the most runs scored in South Africa by a touring batsman. The tour was the second to South Africa by a team from New Zealand, the previous tour having taken place in 1953–54.

After South Africa withdrew from the British Commonwealth in 1961, (Note: South Africa voted to become a republic in 1960 but hoped to remain a member of the Commonwealth. The country requested to be allowed to do so at a meeting in London in 1961 but this was opposed by a number of members due to the apartheid system that had been introduced in South Africa in 1948. As a result South Africa withdrew its application to retain Commonwealth membership.) the tour was not deemed official as the country was no longer a member of the Imperial Cricket Conference (ICC). Despite this, the international matches on the tour have always been considered to have Test match status.

Due to the sporting boycott of South Africa during the apartheid era, no official Test cricket was played by South Africa after 1970, with an effective moratorium on international tours to the country after a resolution passed by the ICC opposing the apartheid system. (Note: By 1970 the ICC was known as the International Cricket Conference. It is now known as the International Cricket Council. South Africa had never officially rejoined after it left the Imperial Cricket Conference in 1961 and the ICC never issued a suspension or an outright ban on cricket against the country.) As a result, New Zealand did not tour the country again until 1994–95, after the end of the apartheid regime and the reintegration of South Africa into international sport in 1991.

== Tour party ==
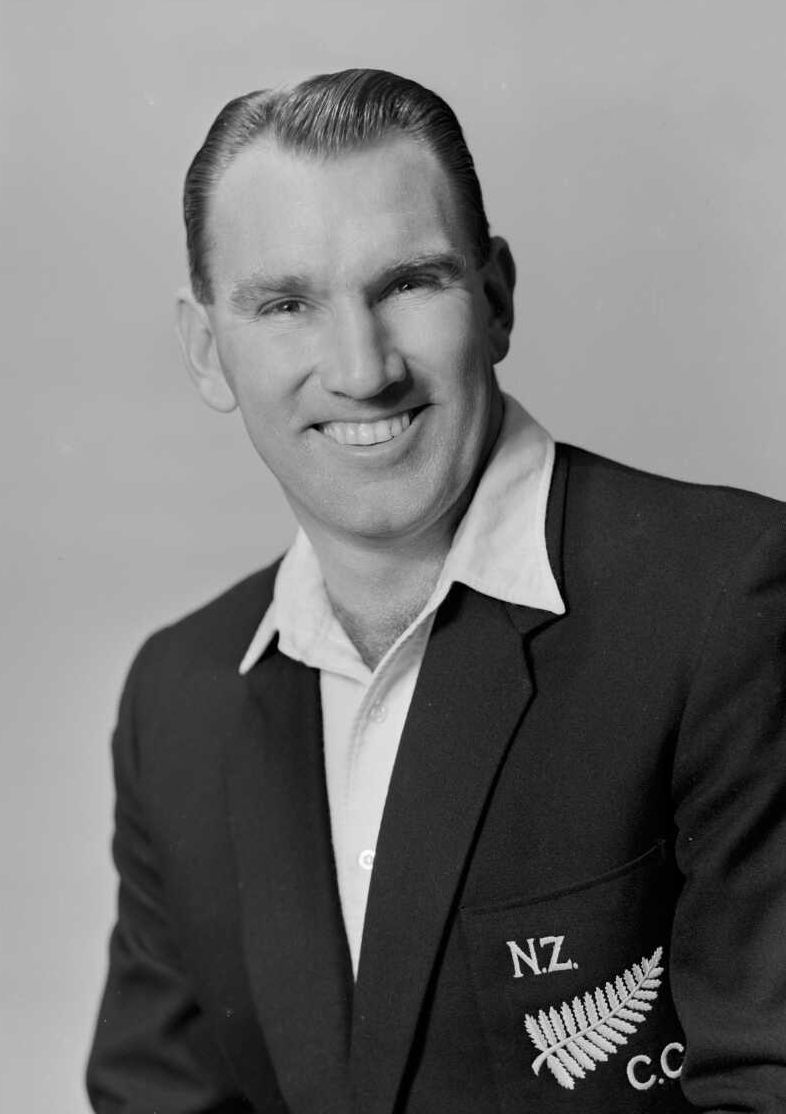
John Reid captained the New Zealand team on the tour

The New Zealand team was captained by John Reid with Murray Chapple as the vice-captain. Reid was by far the most experienced member of the team with 34 Test caps; other than Noel McGregor with 15, no other member of the team had more than 10 caps to their name and eight players on the tour had not made their Test debut. Six of these went on to play in the Test matches on the tour, with only John Ward and Bryan Yuile not playing in any of the Tests. (Note: Both Ward and Yuile later played Test cricket for New Zealand.)

New Zealand's outstanding post-war batsman, Bert Sutcliffe, had retired from Test cricket and was not available for the tour, although he came back into the team for the 1965 tour of India, Pakistan and England at the age of 41. Experienced players Bob Blair and Alex Moir were not selected for the tour.

- John Reid (captain)
- Murray Chapple (vice-captain)
- Jack Alabaster
- Gary Bartlett
- Paul Barton
- Frank Cameron
- Artie Dick
- Graham Dowling
- John Guy
- Zin Harris
- Noel McGregor
- Dick Motz
- John Sparling
- John Ward
- Bryan Yuile

The manager of the team was Gordon Leggat, who played in one of the non-first-class matches on the tour.

A protest against the South African apartheid regime took place during the squad selection meeting in Christchurch. The team was the last from New Zealand to visit apartheid-era South Africa; the next New Zealand team to tour the country did so in 1994/95, after the end of the sporting boycott of South Africa.

== Tour itinerary ==
The tour took place between October 1961 and March 1962. The New Zealanders travelled to and from South Africa via Australia. They played a first-class match against Western Australia on the outward leg of their journey and matches against South Australia and New South Wales on the return journey, the only matches played in March.

A total of 21 matches were played in South Africa during the tour, including the five Test matches, as well as three played in Rhodesia. (Note: In 1961 Southern Rhodesia was a self-governing British Crown colony. The colony's government issued a Unilateral Declaration of Independence in 1965, establishing the unrecognised state of Rhodesia which existed until the formation of Zimbabwe in 1980. The Rhodesia cricket team first played in the Currie Cup, the South African first-class cricket competition, in 1904/05 and played regularly in the competition from 1946/47 until becoming Zimbabwe in 1980. Zimbabwean teams continued to play in South African domestic competitions occasionally in the mid-1990s and in 2007/08. Rhodesia did not play Test cricket and were not considered a full international team before the formation of Zimbabwe, but international teams touring South Africa, including England and Australian teams, occasionally played matches against the Rhodesian team.) Eleven matches, seven of which were first-class, were played during the period between October and December, before the first Test match. These included three matches, two of which were first-class, in Rhodesia. Another eight matches, six of which were first-class, were played between the Test matches, including five in January 1962 between the third and fourth Tests.

== Test series ==
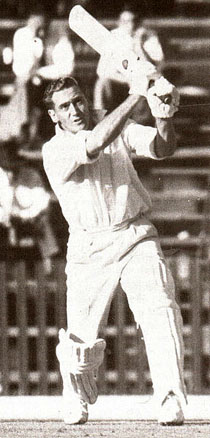
Jackie McGlew scored a century in the first Test to lead the home team to victory.

All of the Test matches during the tour were four-day matches. (Note: The duration of Test matches has varied throughout the history of Test cricket. Although most modern matches are scheduled to be played over five days, historically Test matches have been played over three, four or six days as well. Timeless Tests, matches played to their conclusion without a time limit, have also been played, mainly in Australia during the period before the Second World War.) Each team won two of the five matches with one drawn Test, leaving the series drawn.

=== First Test ===
The first Test match of the tour was held at Kingsmead Cricket Ground in Durban, beginning on 8 December 1961. Seven of the South African team and five New Zealanders made their Test debuts in the match. The South African team was captained by Jackie McGlew in his final series.

South Africa won the toss and chose to bat, scoring 292 runs in their first innings, and innings anchored by McGlew who carried his bat with a score of 127. Only Roy McLean, who scored 63, made a score of more than 25 runs and Wisden commented that the batting of the new South African players, other than Colin Bland, was "disappointing" throughout the match. In reply New Zealand scored 245 runs, with Paul Barton and Zin Harris both making half-centuries, leaving South Africa with a lead of 47 runs after the first innings.

After a rest day on Sunday 10 December, (Note: It was common for Test matches to include rest days, generally on Sundays, until the 1990s.) South Africa resumed their second innings. When Bland was fourth man out with the score on 110 they appeared well placed to build a big lead, but collapsed in less than an hour to be all out for 149, leaving New Zealand to score 197 runs with more than a days play remaining. They failed to reach their target and were all out for 166 after what Wisden called "rank bad batting", with South Africa winning the match by just 30 runs. Peter Pollock, on his Test debut aged 20, took a five-wicket haul with six wickets for a cost of 38 runs in the innings and nine wickets in the match.

8–12 December 1961	South Africa	v	New Zealand	South Africa won by 30 runs
Scorecard; Wisden report	292 (88.5 overs); DJ McGlew 127; FJ Cameron 3/60 (27 overs)		245 (99.3 overs); PGZ Harris 74; KA Walter 4/63 (25.3 overs)	Kingsmead, Durban; Umpires: WP Anderson and DR Fell
Scorecard; Wisden report	149 (61.2 overs); JHB Waite 63; FJ Cameron 3/32 (15.2 overs)		166 (79.3 overs); SN McGregor 55; PM Pollock 6/38 (20.3 overs)	Kingsmead, Durban; Umpires: WP Anderson and DR Fell
South Africa won the toss and chose to bat; 10 December was a rest day EJ Barlow, KC Bland, HD Bromfield, MK Elgie, GB Lawrence, PM Pollock, KA Walter (all South Africa), GA Bartlett, PT Barton, FJ Cameron, AE Dick and RC Motz (all New Zealand) made their Test match debut.

=== Second Test ===
The second Test match began on Boxing Day at Wanderers in Johannesburg. McGlew again won the toss and chose to bat, John Waite scoring a century in South Africa's first innings score of 322 runs. Frank Cameron took five wickets in the innings. Rain had restricted play to only 80 minutes on the first day, and New Zealand did not begin their reply until the final session of the second day. They scored 223 in their innings, with Godfrey Lawrence taking eight wickets for 53 runs, the best bowling figures in Test matches by a South African fast bowler. (Note: As of December 2020 Lawrence's figures remain the best by a South African fast bowler and third best by any type of bowler for the team. Spin bowlers Hugh Tayfield and Keshav Maharaj have both taken nine wickets in a Test match innings, Tayfield doing so in 1957 and Maharaj in 2018.) Debutant Graham Dowling top scored for New Zealand with 74.

McGlew declared South Africa's second innings at 178/6, leaving New Zealand with a target of 278 runs in around four hours play. They reached 165 runs for the loss of four wickets and the match was drawn, with Wisden lamenting the loss of time to rain on the first day. Dowling scored a second half century, with John Reid top scoring with 75 not out.

26–29 December 1961	South Africa	v	New Zealand	Drawn
Scorecard; Wisden report	322 (103.2 overs); JHB Waite 101; FJ Cameron 5/83 (36.2 overs)		223 (92.3 overs); GT Dowling 74; GB Lawrence 8/53 (30.3 overs)	Wanderers, Johannesburg; Umpires: WP Anderson and HC Kidson
Scorecard; Wisden report	178/6 declared (43 overs); EJ Barlow 45; RC Motz 4/68 (17 overs)		165/4 (68 overs); JR Reid 75*; PM Pollock 2/18 (14 overs)	Wanderers, Johannesburg; Umpires: WP Anderson and HC Kidson
South Africa won the toss and chose to bat; Only 80 minutes play was possible on the first day of the match due to rain; GT Dowling (New Zealand) made his Test match debut

=== Third Test ===
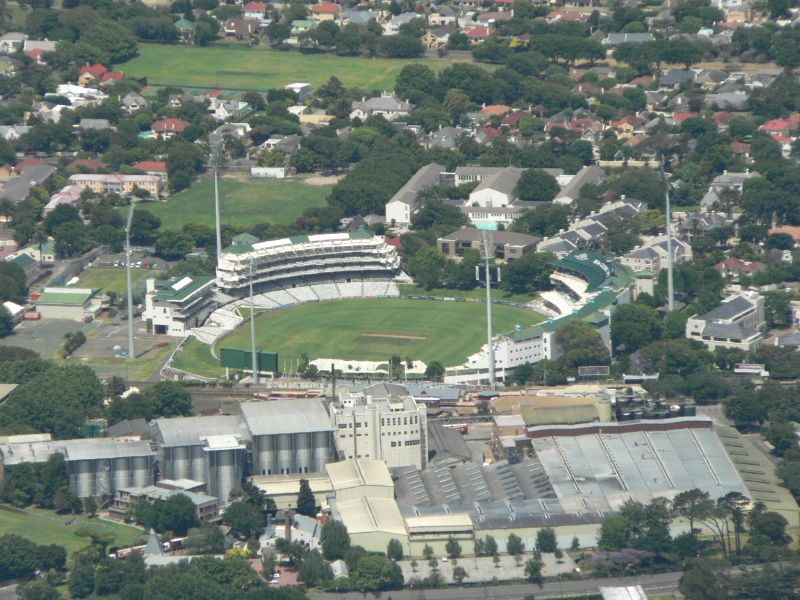
The third Test was played at Newlands Cricket Ground

The third Test was played at Newlands in Cape Town, beginning on New Year's Day. Reid won the toss for the first time in the series and New Zealand chose to bat, scoring 385 runs in their first innings, attacking the South African bowling after losing early wickets. Reid scored a "pulsating" 92 runs before Murray Chapple and Zin Harris put on 148 runs for the fifth wicket, Harris scoring his maiden Test century before being stumped for 101. Sydney Burke, making his debut for South Africa, took six wickets, including four cheap ones on the second morning of the match. Buster Farrer also made his debut for South Africa in the match.

In reply South Africa were bowled out for 190 runs, Cameron taking a five-wicket haul. Reid did not enforce the follow on (Note: In a four-day match the follow on target is 150 runs less than the team batting first made in total. If the team batting second fails to reach this target (235 runs in this case) they could have been asked to bat again, thus following on. It is a matter of match tactics whether or not the follow on is enforced.) and New Zealand scored 212 runs before declaring with nine wickets down, Burke taking another five wickets for 11 on debut.

South Africa required 407 runs to win the match. McGlew, who suffered a hand injury, made 63 runs and McLean a century in under three hours, but the South Africans were bowled out for 335, New Zealand winning by 72 runs. The victory, which Wisden described as a "thriller", was their second in Test matches and their first away from home. (Note: New Zealand played its first Test match in 1930, but did not win a match until 1956 when the team, captained by John Reid, defeated the visiting West Indies team.)

1–4 January 1962	New Zealand	v	South Africa	New Zealand won by 72 runs
Scorecard; Wisden report	385 (157.5 overs); PGZ Harris 101; SF Burke 6/128 (19.5 overs)		190 (68.4 overs); EJ Barlow 51; FJ Cameron 5/48 (24.4 overs)	Newlands, Cape Town; Umpires: DV Collins and JE Warner
Scorecard; Wisden report	212/9 declared (88.1 overs); AE Dick 50*; SF Burke 5/68 (27.1 overs)		335 (142.2 overs); RA McLean 113; JC Alabaster 4/119 (50 overs)	Newlands, Cape Town; Umpires: DV Collins and JE Warner
New Zealand won the toss and chose to bat; SF Burke and WS Farrer (both South Africa) made their Test match debuts

=== Fourth Test ===
The fourth Test was played at the beginning of February, with Wanderers being used again to host the match. Burke was dropped, despite his bowling display in the previous Test, and Peter Heine returned to the South African team after an absence of three years. It was to be his last Test match. Tiger Lance made his Test debut for the South Africans, the team's tenth new cap of the series.

Reid won the toss again and opted to bat, but New Zealand were dismissed for 164 runs in their first innings, with Godfrey Lawrence taking another five-wicket haul at Wanderers. Only Reid, who played a "glorious innings" for 60, scored more than 22 runs. South Africa replied with a score of 464, with an opening partnership of 134 and another century from McGlew, the seventh and last of his Test match career. Facing a deficit of over 300, New Zealand lost both opening batsmen for ducks and were all out for 249. Reid again dominated the innings, scoring 142, but his team lost by an innings and 51 runs with a full day to play. The match saw South African wicket-keeper John Waite take his 24th dismissal of the series, breaking the world record for dismissals in a five-match series by a wicket-keeper with a match remaining.

2–5 February 1962	New Zealand	v	South Africa	South Africa won by an innings and 51 runs
Scorecard; Wisden report	164 (53.1 overs); JR Reid 60; GB Lawrence 5/52 (16.1 overs)		464 (124.2 overs); DJ McGlew 120; JR Reid 3/55 (16 overs)	Wanderers, Johannesburg; Umpires: HC Kidson and G Parry
Scorecard; Wisden report	249 (88.2 overs); JR Reid 142; GB Lawrence 4/57 (22.2 overs)			Wanderers, Johannesburg; Umpires: HC Kidson and G Parry
New Zealand won the toss and chose to bat; 4 February was a rest day The match was scheduled to last until 6 February but was completed within three days of play HR Lance (South Africa) made his Test match debut

=== Fifth Test ===
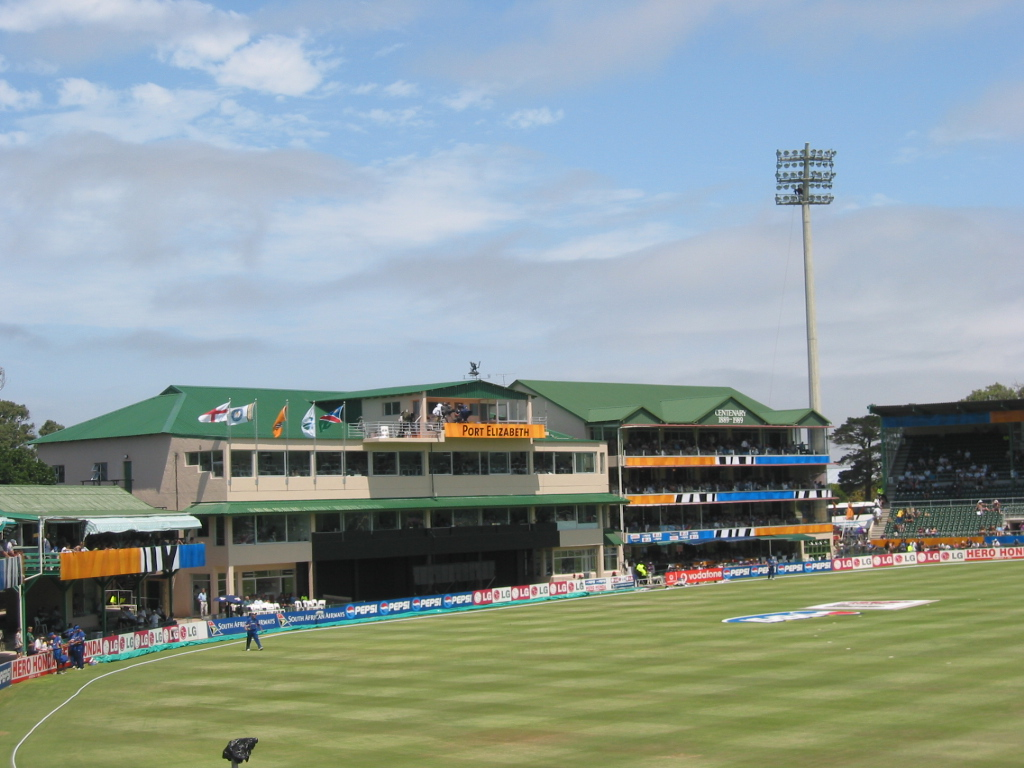
The pitch at St George's Oval for the fifth Test favoured the batters.

The final Test match of the series was played at St George's Oval in Port Elizabeth, beginning on 16 February. Reid won the toss for the third match in a row and chose to bat on what Wisden described as a "batsman's wicket". (Note: A batsman's wicket is one on which the ball bounces consistently, making it easier for batsmen to score runs. They are sometimes called "flat wickets".)

The New Zealanders scored 275 runs, with Paul Barton top-scoring with 109, scoring his only Test century in an innings Wisden described as "composed, correct and polished". In reply South Africa scored 190, with opening batsman McGlew, playing in his final Test, suffering from an injured shoulder and not batting until ninth in the batting order as a result. New Zealand were then bowled out for 228 runs in their second innings, leaving South Africa requiring 314 to win the match.

The second South African innings was in trouble at 199 for the loss of eight wickets, until a ninth wicket stand of 60 runs brought them to within 60 runs of the target. They lost their final two wickets, the last falling with only 21 minutes of play remaining in the match. to leave New Zealand the winners by 40 runs, levelling the series at 2 wins apiece. Waite took two more dismissals to take his total for the Test matches to 26, at the time the most by a wicket-keeper in a five-match Test series. New Zealand's wicket-keeper Artie Dick took five dismissals during the match, leaving him with a total of 23 for the series, equalling the previous record.

16–20 February 1962	New Zealand	v	South Africa	New Zealand won by 40 runs
Scorecard; Wisden report	275 (111.2 overs); PT Barton 109; NAT Adcock 3/60 (27 overs)		190 (72.4 overs); GB Lawrence 43; RC Motz 3/33 (14 overs)	St George's Oval, Port Elizabeth; Umpires: DB Gibbon and G Parry
Scorecard; Wisden report	228 (83.1 overs); GT Dowling 78*; GB Lawrence 4/85 (28 overs)		273 (144 overs); EJ Barlow 59; JR Reid 4/44 (45 overs)	St George's Oval, Port Elizabeth; Umpires: DB Gibbon and G Parry
New Zealand won the toss and chose to bat; 18 February was a rest day

== Other matches ==
The New Zealanders played 22 other matches during the tour. Three of these were played in Australia, one on the outward leg of the journey and two on the return. In total, 16 matches of these matches were considered first-class, including all three matches played in Australia. An additional match was played after the team returned to New Zealand against a touring team.

=== Outward journey ===
New Zealand arrived in Perth on 8 October 1961 and spent three days practicing before playing a first-class match against Western Australia.

12–14 October 1961	New Zealanders	v	Western Australia	Drawn
Scorecard	249 (60.5 overs); JR Reid 62; HG Bevan 5/55 (11.5 overs)		113 (37.7 overs); HK Joynt 18; FJ Cameron 7/27 (16 overs)	WACA Ground, Perth, Western Australia; Umpires: AE Mackley and NE Townsend
Scorecard	173/5 declared (53 overs); GT Dowling 83*; KF Punch 2/18 (11 overs)		253/3 (51 overs); KF Punch 76; JT Sparling 1/25 (7 overs)	WACA Ground, Perth, Western Australia; Umpires: AE Mackley and NE Townsend
New Zealand won the toss and chose to bat; Eight-ball overs were used in the match

=== Early tour matches ===
After arriving in South Africa on 17 October, the New Zealand team travelled first to Southern Rhodesia to play three matches, two of which were first-class, against Rhodesian teams in October, narrowly avoiding defeat in the first match. They then travelled back to South Africa and played eight matches before the first Test. Five of these matches were first-class.

21–23 October 1961	Rhodesia	v	New Zealanders	Drawn
Summary; Scorecard (subscription required)	311/9 declared (111 overs); KC Bland 91; JR Reid 3/59 (25 overs)		262 (77 overs); JR Reid 97; JM Griffin 4/74 (27 overs)	Queens Sports Club, Bulawayo; Umpires: HR Brown and HMF Johnston
Summary; Scorecard (subscription required)	197/4 declared (66 overs); RA Gripper 52; RC Motz 5/65 (24 overs)		162/9 (64 overs); PGZ Harris 47; JT Partridge 5/52 (16 overs)	Queens Sports Club, Bulawayo; Umpires: HR Brown and HMF Johnston
Rhodesia won the toss and chose to bat

25–26 October 1961	Rhodesia Country Districts	v	New Zealanders	Drawn
Scorecard (subscription required)	326/5 declared (67 overs); PGZ Harris 86; P Elgin 3/96 (20 overs)		347/8 declared (84.3 overs); T Taberer 101; RC Motz 2/51 (71 overs)	Que Que Sports Club, Que Que; Umpires: J Fletcher and Kietzman
Scorecard (subscription required)	245/3 (61 overs); JW Guy 83; N Waller 1/29 (8 overs)			Que Que Sports Club, Que Que; Umpires: J Fletcher and Kietzman
New Zealanders won the toss and chose to bat; Non first-class match played over two days

28–30 October 1961	Rhodesia	v	New Zealanders	Drawn
Summary; Scorecard (subscription required)	189 (82.5 overs); KC Bland 67; JC Alabaster 4/71 (26.5 overs)		186 (74.1 overs); JW Guy 54; GB Lawrence 5/32 (18.1 overs)	Police A Ground, Salisbury; Umpires: G Lowe and WK Smith
Summary; Scorecard (subscription required)	255/8 declared (92 overs); AJ Pithey 66; JC Alabaster 4/80 (28 overs)		27/0 (12 overs); JT Sparling 19 not out	Police A Ground, Salisbury; Umpires: G Lowe and WK Smith
Rhodesia won the toss and chose to bat

After returning from Rhodesia, the New Zealanders played eight matches before the first Test match in early December.

3–6 November 1961	Transvaal	v	New Zealanders	Drawn
Scorecard (subscription required)	397/9 declared (105 overs); JHB Waite 122; JT Sparling 2/45 (9 overs)		317/9 declared (108 overs); PT Barton 110; PS Heine 3/61 (21 overs)	New Wanderers, Johannesburg; Umpires: WP Anderson and HC Kidson
Scorecard (subscription required)	167/5 declared (50 overs); IR Fullerton 81 not out RC Motz 3/36 (19 overs)		185/6 (69.5 overs); SN McGregor 102; PS Heine 2/29 (17 overs)	New Wanderers, Johannesburg; Umpires: WP Anderson and HC Kidson
Transvaal won the toss and chose to bat; 5 November was a rest day

8–9 November 1961	Natal Country Districts	v	New Zealanders	Drawn
Scorecard (subscription required)	151 (53.1 overs); C Logan 47; FJ Cameron 6/42 (16 overs)		239/7 declared (93 overs); ME Chapple 120 not out LW Payn 3/92 (30.3 overs)	Alexandra Memorial Ground, Umzinto; Umpires: JDM Anderson and LD Lamble
Scorecard (subscription required)	167/5 (50 overs); E Eaglestone 75; FJ Cameron 3/36 (16 overs)			Alexandra Memorial Ground, Umzinto; Umpires: JDM Anderson and LD Lamble
Natal Country Districts won the toss and chose to bat; Non first-class match played over two days

10–13 November 1961	Natal	v	New Zealanders	Drawn
Scorecard (subscription required)	242 (62.4 overs); RA McLean 50; FJ Cameron 4/55 (16 overs)		215 (96 overs); JW Guy 60; NAT Adcock 4/28 (28 overs)	Kingsmead Cricket Ground, Durban; Umpires: P A'Bear and JG Kidson
Scorecard (subscription required)	167 (52.3 overs); MK Elgie 72; RC Motz 7/70 (19.3 overs)		108/5 (49 overs); PT Barton 23; JM Cole 2/17 (12 overs)	Kingsmead Cricket Ground, Durban; Umpires: P A'Bear and JG Kidson
Natal won the toss and chose to bat; 12 November was a rest day

15–16 November 1961	Transvaal Country Districts	v	New Zealanders	New Zealanders won by an innings and 113 runs
Scorecard (subscription required)	115 (50.1 overs); P Levy 27; RC Motz 8/37 (16.1 overs)		325/6 declared (65 overs); JW Guy 122; A Dell 3/75 (17 overs)	West Rand Consolidated Mines Ground, Krugersdorp; Umpires: AGR Morris and G Parry
Scorecard (subscription required)	97 (45.1 overs); R Lindsay 28; JC Alabaster 4/45 (15.1 overs)			West Rand Consolidated Mines Ground, Krugersdorp; Umpires: AGR Morris and G Parry
Transvaal Country Districts won the toss and chose to bat; Non first-class match played over two days

17–20 November 1961	New Zealanders	v	Griqualand West	New Zealanders won by 168 runs
Scorecard (subscription required)	303 (91.2 overs); BW Yuile 58; BA Goble 5/67 (21 overs)		179 (71 overs); MK Glover 69; JC Alabaster 5/84 (21 overs)	De Beers Stadium, Kimberley; Umpires: TH Boggan and A Dunn
Scorecard (subscription required)	166/5 declared (36 overs); JW Guy 67 not out CR English 3/58 (15 overs)		122 (70 overs); MK Glover 29; CWJ Hayes 29; RC Motz 4/20 (16 overs)	De Beers Stadium, Kimberley; Umpires: TH Boggan and A Dunn
Griqualand West won the toss and chose to field; 19 November was a rest day

24–27 November 1961	Western Province	v	New Zealanders	Drawn
Scorecard (subscription required)	315/9 declared (124 overs); JH Ferrandi 81 not out JR Reid 2/46 (20 overs)		523 (155.5 overs); JR Reid 203; HD Bromfield 3/129 (41 overs)	Newlands, Cape Town; Umpires: DV Collins and JE Warner
Scorecard (subscription required)	247 (107.3 overs); WL Taylor 61; FJ Cameron 3/44 (25 overs)			Newlands, Cape Town; Umpires: DV Collins and JE Warner
Western Province won the toss and chose to bat; 26 November was a rest day

8–9 November 1961	Western Province Country Districts	v	New Zealanders	New Zealanders won by 8 wickets
Scorecard (subscription required)	124 (79.2 overs); JA Kennedy 33; PGZ Harris 4/21 (13 overs)		173 (51.4 overs); SN McGregor 37; PJ Slabbert 3/41 (15 overs)	Recreation Ground, Oudtshoorn; Umpires: J Gordon and EL Tuchten
Scorecard (subscription required)	123 (65.2 overs); JL Taylor 30; ME Chapple 3/30 (17.2 overs)		76/2 (26.4 overs); GT Dowling 49 not out RR Lindsay 1/19 (8 overs)	Recreation Ground, Oudtshoorn; Umpires: J Gordon and EL Tuchten
Western Province Country Districts won the toss and chose to bat; Non first-class match played over two days

2–5 December 1961	New Zealanders	v	Eastern Province	Drawn
Scorecard (subscription required)	249 (92.4 overs); AE Dick 75; PM Pollock 6/53 (23 overs)		271 (103.3 overs); RG Pollock 78; JC Alabaster 5/71 (29.3 overs)	St George's Park, Port Elizabeth; Umpires: DB Gibbon and G Minnaar
Scorecard (subscription required)	254/9 declared (83.3 overs); JR Reid 49; JB Brodie 5/58 (23.3 overs)		139/9 (61 overs); PH Copeland 54; JC Alabaster 4/60 (21 overs)	St George's Park, Port Elizabeth; Umpires: DB Gibbon and G Minnaar
New Zealanders won the toss and chose to bat; 4 December was a rest day

=== Mid tour matches ===
Between the first and second Tests, the New Zealanders played first-class matches in Pretoria and Benoni. The second and third Tests were played over the Christmas and New Year period without any intervening fixtures, and were followed by five fixtures, three of which were first-class, before the fourth Test. A single first-class match was played in East London between the fourth and fifth Tests.

15–19 December 1961	New Zealanders	v	South African Universities	New Zealanders won by 37 runs
Scorecard (subscription required)	228 (96.3 overs); BW Yuile 75; MA Seymour 7/80 (32.3 overs)		207 (78.3 overs); MA Menter 48; RC Motz 4/21 (14 overs)	Berea Park, Pretoria; Umpires: GI Fitzpatrick and GS Hawkins
Scorecard (subscription required)	215 (82.4 overs); SN McGregor 51; MA Seymour 5/72 (32 overs)		199 (78.1 overs); RJ Falkson 45; JC Alabaster 6/82 (26.1 overs)	Berea Park, Pretoria; Umpires: GI Fitzpatrick and GS Hawkins
New Zealanders won the toss and chose to bat; 16 and 17 December were rest days

21–23 December 1961	New Zealanders	v	North Eastern Transvaal	Drawn
Scorecard (subscription required)	228 (96.3 overs); JR Reid 39; JT Botten 6/40 (26.4 overs)		218 (83.5 overs); DT Lindsay 77; FJ Cameron 6/48 (31 overs)	Willowmoore Park, Benoni; Umpires: TV Burnard and JG Sharp
Scorecard (subscription required)	282/9 declared (110 overs); JR Reid 50; NM Riley 4/39 (20 overs)		142/6 (55 overs); KJ Funston 59; JR Reid 2/10 (5 overs)	Willowmoore Park, Benoni; Umpires: TV Burnard and JG Sharp
New Zealanders won the toss and chose to bat

The second Test started on 26 December and the third on 1 January after which the New Zealanders played five more matches before the fourth Test match.

6–8 January 1962	New Zealanders	v	South African Country Districts	Drawn
Scorecard (subscription required)	169 (52 overs); BW Yuile 29; JJA Nunan 3/48 (16 overs)		97 (47.5 overs); DCB Lang 22; JJA Nunan 22; RC Motz 3/22 (10 overs); JC Alabaster 3/22 (15.5 overs)	De Beers Stadium, Kimberley; Umpires: TH Boggan and LCP Oates
Scorecard (subscription required)	167/5 declared (45.4 overs); JW Guy 71; AIH Rennie 3/45 (15 overs)		181/7 (63 overs); E Eaglestone 98 not out GA Bartlett 3/27 (11 overs)	De Beers Stadium, Kimberley; Umpires: TH Boggan and LCP Oates
New Zealanders won the toss and chose to bat; Non first-class match played over two days

12–15 January 1962	New Zealanders	v	Orange Free State	Drawn
Scorecard (subscription required)	337/7 declared (95.4 overs); ME Chapple 150 not out N Wessels 5/111 (32 overs)		314 (133.3 overs); C Richardson 114; JC Alabaster 4/106 (45.3 overs)	Ramblers Cricket Club Ground, Bloemfontein; Umpires: LM Baxter and H Melzer
Scorecard (subscription required)	237/4 declared (55 overs); JR Reid 118 not out WT Strydom 1/31 (5 overs)		178/6 (77 overs); DJ Schonegevel 30; S Strydom 30; JC Alabaster 5/86 (35 overs)	Ramblers Cricket Club Ground, Bloemfontein; Umpires: LM Baxter and H Melzer
Orange Free State won the toss and chose to field; 14 January was a rest day

19–22 January 1962	South African Colts XI	v	New Zealanders	Drawn
Scorecard (subscription required)	318/4 declared (83 overs); WS Farrer 147 not out RC Motz 2/86 (25 overs)		295 (71.1 overs); JR Reid 165; JM Cole 5/80 (22.1 overs)	Jan Smuts Ground, East London; Umpires: C Baines and TMA Gunton
Scorecard (subscription required)	144 (70.3 overs); IR Fullerton 35; JC Alabaster 7/41 (17 overs)		116/8 (48 overs); PT Barton 42; HR Lance 4/45 (18 overs)	Jan Smuts Ground, East London; Umpires: C Baines and TMA Gunton
South African Colts won the toss and chose to bat; 21 January was a rest day

24–25 January 1962	New Zealanders	v	Natal XI	Drawn
Scorecard (subscription required)	262 (80.2 overs); JG Leggat 91 not out PHJ Trimborn 5/85 (23.2 overs)		231 (54.5 overs); CGD Burger 65; JC Alabaster 4/74 (16.5 overs)	Oval, Kokstad; Umpires: D Dorning and RLD Gilson
Scorecard (subscription required)	188/8 declared (57 overs); JW Guy 70; PHJ Trimborn 4/38 (17 overs)		151/4 (23 overs); RK Lambert 42; AE Dick 2/33 (4 overs)	Oval, Kokstad; Umpires: D Dorning and RLD Gilson
New Zealanders won the toss and chose to bat; Non first-class match played over two days

26–29 January 1962	New Zealanders	v	Natal	Drawn
Scorecard (subscription required)	474 (126.2 overs); GT Dowling 145; R Dumbrill 3/79 (18 overs)		293 (89 overs); R Dumbrill 74; JC Alabaster 4/64 (20 overs)	Jan Smuts Stadium, Pietermaritzburg; Umpires: DT Drew and DR Fell
Scorecard (subscription required)			384 (88.2 overs following on); C Wesley 131; PGZ Harris 3/34 (8.2 overs)	Jan Smuts Stadium, Pietermaritzburg; Umpires: DT Drew and DR Fell
New Zealanders won the toss and chose to bat Natal were asked to follow on after completing their first innings 181 runs behind; 28 January was a rest day

After the fourth Test match, which was scheduled to be played between 2–6 February, the New Zealanders played one first-class match against Border before the final Test match began on 16 February.

9–12 February 1962	Border	v	New Zealanders	New Zealanders won by 9 wickets
Scorecard (subscription required)	204 (63.1 overs); S Knott 65; FJ Cameron 5/39 (19 overs)		343 (111.3 overs); JR Reid 107; RK Thorne 8/101 (47.3 overs)	Jan Smuts Ground, East London; Umpires: TMA Gunton and FH Winrow
Scorecard (subscription required)	193 (78.1 overs); PJ Muzzell 95; RC Motz 6/53 (19.1 overs)		57/1 (17.1 overs); GT Dowling 126; RK Thorne 1/29 (8 overs)	Jan Smuts Ground, East London; Umpires: TMA Gunton and FH Winrow
Border won the toss and chose to bat; 11 February was a rest day

=== Return journey ===
After leaving South Africa after the final Test at the end of February, the New Zealanders played two first-class matches against Australian teams on the return journey. Immediately after arriving back in New Zealand, a further first-class match was played against a Commonwealth XI. The New Zealand team featured exclusively players from the touring team.

2–5 March 1962	New Zealanders	v	South Australia	South Australia won by 6 wickets
Scorecard	129 (45.5 overs); GT Dowling 41; DJ Sincock 6/54 (15 overs)		260 (75 overs); LE Favell 109; FJ Cameron 5/56 (21 overs)	Adelaide Oval, Adelaide, South Australia; Umpires: CJ Egar and NJ Odlum
Scorecard	251 (70.6 overs); GT Dowling 54; NJN Hawke 5/71 (17.6 overs)		121/4 (35 overs); JC Lill 52*; BW Yuile 2/38 (8 overs)	Adelaide Oval, Adelaide, South Australia; Umpires: CJ Egar and NJ Odlum
South Australia won the toss and chose to field; Eight-ball overs were used in the match 4 March was a rest day The match was scheduled to last four days but was completed on the third day

9–12 March 1962	New South Wales	v	New Zealanders	New South Wales won by 59 runs
Scorecard	322/7 declared (62 overs); AK Davidson 76; GA Bartlett 2/54 (10 overs); JR Reid 2/54 (13 overs)		251 (67.1 overs); AE Dick 127; R Benaud 5/30 (12 overs)	Sydney Cricket Ground, Sydney, New South Wales; Umpires: FT Tilley and EF Wykes
Scorecard	152/7 declared (34 overs); NC O'Neill 46; GA Bartlett 4/26 (7 overs)		164 (41.1 overs); JR Reid 40; R Benaud 3/52 (11 overs)	Sydney Cricket Ground, Sydney, New South Wales; Umpires: FT Tilley and EF Wykes
New Zealander won the toss and chose to field; Eight-ball overs were used in the match 11 March was a rest day

16–19 March 1962	New Zealand XI	v	Commonwealth XI	International XI won by 8 wickets
Scorecard (subscription required)	207 (86.3 overs); GT Dowling 67; R Benaud 5/49 (25 overs)		414/7 declared (109.4 overs); RB Simpson 167; JC Alabaster 3/106 (25.4 overs)	Lancaster Park, Christchurch; Umpires: RW Pollock and AJ Reece
Scorecard (subscription required)	241 (77.5 overs); SN McGregor 72; R Benaud 5/62 (21 overs)		35/2 (12.5 overs); DA Ford 22*; SN McGregor 1/5 (4 overs)	Lancaster Park, Christchurch; Umpires: RW Pollock and AJ Reece
New Zealand XI won the toss and chose to bat; The match was part of a world tour undertaken by a Commonwealth XI 18 March was a rest day
