= List of South Africa cricketers who have taken five-wicket hauls on Test debut =

List of cricketers

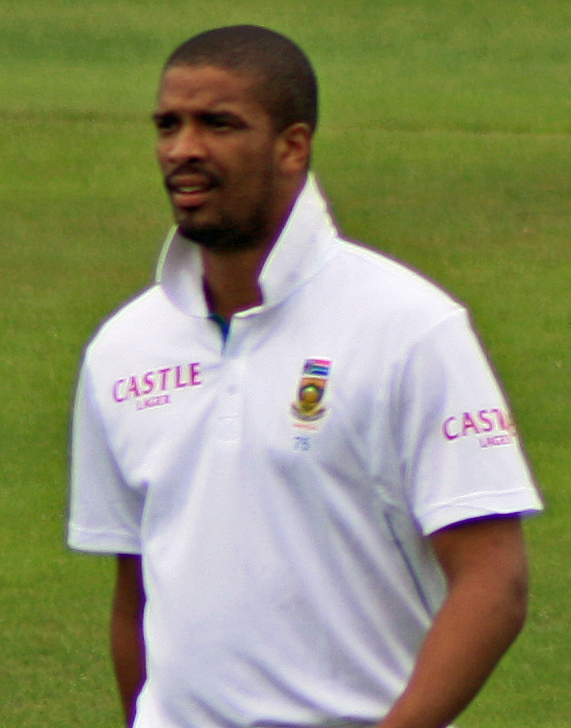
Vernon Philander has conceded the fewest runs while taking a five-wicket haul.

In cricket, a five-wicket haul (also known as a "five–for" or "fifer") refers to a bowler taking five or more wickets in a single innings. A five-wicket haul on debut is regarded by the critics as a notable achievement. As of November 2026, 181 cricketers have taken a five-wicket haul on Test match debut, out of which twenty-five were from the South Africa national cricket team. The five-wicket hauls have come against six different opponents, and the South Africans have performed this feat fifteen times against England. Of the twenty-two matches where a South African debutant has taken a five-wicket haul, twelve have ended in defeat, six in victory and the other four in a draw. The five-wicket hauls were taken at eleven different venues, six of them being taken at the Newlands Cricket Ground, Cape Town.

Albert Rose-Innes was the first South African to take a five-wicket haul on Test cricket debut. He took 5 wickets for 43 runs against England in 1889. (Note: The match marked his debut in first-class cricket.) In the second Test of the series, Gobo Ashley took 7 wickets for 95 runs, in what turned out to be his only appearance in Test cricket. When the country was re-admitted to play competitive cricket in 1991, Lance Klusener became the first debutant to take a five-wicket haul. (Note: The International Cricket Council had suspended South Africa in 1970 because of the government's apartheid policy.) His 8 wickets for 64 runs against India in November 1996 remain the best bowling figures in an innings by a South African on debut. (Note: As of February 2015, the figures are the fourth-best by any bowler on debut.) Sydney Burke and Alf Hall are the only South African debutants to collect 10 or more wickets in a match as of February 2015. (Note: Hall's figures of 11 wickets for 112 runs are the best bowling figures in a match by a South Africa debutant.) Klusener's figures, along with George Bissett's 5 for 37 runs, were included among the "Top 100 Bowling performances of all time" by the Wisden Cricketers' Almanack in 2002. Neil Brand is the latest cricketer to achieve this feat; he took 6/119 against New Zealand in February 2024.

== Key ==
- Date – Starting date of the match
- Inn – The innings of the match in which the five-wicket haul was taken.
- Overs – Number of overs bowled in that innings.
- Runs – Runs conceded.
- Wkts – Number of wickets taken.
- Econ – Bowling economy rate (average runs per over).
- Batsmen – The batsmen whose wickets were taken in the five-wicket haul.
- Result – The result for the South African team in that match.
- † – The bowler was selected "Man of the match".
- ‡ – The bowler took 10 wickets or more in the match.

== Five-wicket hauls ==
Five-wicket hauls on Test debut by South African bowlers
No.	Bowler	Date	Ground	Against	Inn	Overs	Runs	Wkts	Econ	Batsmen	Result
1	Albert Rose-Innes	12 March 1889	Crusaders Ground, St George's Park, Port Elizabeth	England	1	18.0	43	5	3.58	Bobby Abel; Frank Hearne; Henry Wood; Johnny Briggs; Charles Coventry	Lost
2	Gobo Ashley	25 March 1889	Newlands, Cape Town	England	1	43.1	95	7	3.29	Bobby Abel; George Ulyett; Maurice Read; Monty Bowden; Basil Grieve; Emile McMaster; Arnold Fothergill	Lost
3	Bonnor Middleton	13 February 1896	Crusaders Ground, St George's Park, Port Elizabeth	England	1	25.4	64	5	2.97	Tom Hayward; C. B. Fry; Hugh Bromley-Davenport; Lord Hawke; Harry Butt	Lost
4	George Rowe	2 March 1896	Old Wanderers, Johannesburg	England	1	49.0	115	5	2.81	Tim O'Brien; Tom Hayward; C. B. Fry; Hugh Bromley-Davenport; Christopher Heseltine	Lost
5	Alf Hall ‡	1 January 1923	Newlands, Cape Town	England	2	37.3	63	7	1.68	Andy Sandham; Frank Woolley; Phil Mead; Arthur Carr; Percy Fender; Frank Mann; Vallance Jupp	Lost
6	George Parker	14 June 1924	Edgbaston, Birmingham	England	1	37.0	152	6	4.10	Herbert Sutcliffe; Frank Woolley; Patsy Hendren; Percy Chapman; Maurice Tate; George Wood	Lost
7	Henry Promnitz	24 December 1927	Old Wanderers, Johannesburg	England	1	37.0	58	5	1.56	Herbert Sutcliffe; Bob Wyatt; Greville Stevens; Ewart Astill; Rony Stanyforth	Lost
8	George Bissett	31 December 1927	Newlands, Cape Town	England	1	17.0	37	5	2.17	Percy Holmes; Herbert Sutcliffe; Ernest Tyldesley; Greville Stevens; Bob Wyatt	Lost
9	Sandy Bell	29 June 1929	Lord's, London	England	1	30.4	99	6	3.22	Herbert Sutcliffe; Maurice Leyland; Maurice Tate; Walter Robins; Harold Larwood; Jack White	Drawn
10	Norman Gordon	24 December 1938	Old Wanderers, Johannesburg	England	1	33.4	103	5	2.30	Wally Hammond; Les Ames; Bryan Valentine; Len Wilkinson; Ken Farnes	Drawn
11	Lindsay Tuckett	7 June 1947	Trent Bridge, Nottingham	England	1	37.0	68	5	1.83	Cyril Washbrook; Denis Compton; Norman Yardley; Sam Cook; Jack Martin	Drawn
12	Cuan McCarthy	16 December 1948	Kingsmead, Durban	England	2	12.0	43	6	2.68	George Mann; Denis Compton; Allan Watkins; Reg Simpson; Godfrey Evans; Roly Jenkins	Lost
13	Michael Melle	10 February 1950	Ellis Park, Johannesburg	Australia	1	33.0	113	5	2.56	Jack Moroney; Keith Miller; Ray Lindwall; Sam Loxton; Ian Johnson	Drawn
14	David Ironside	24 December 1953	Ellis Park, Johannesburg	New Zealand	1	19.0	51	5	2.01	Geoff Rabone; Lawrie Miller; Frank Mooney; Tony MacGibbon; Guy Overton	Won
15	Peter Heine	23 June 1955	Lord's, London	England	1	25.0	60	5	2.40	Tom Graveney; Peter May; Denis Compton; Ken Barrington; Godfrey Evans	Lost
16	Peter Pollock	8 December 1961	Kingsmead, Durban	New Zealand	2	20.3	38	6	1.85	John Guy; Paul Barton; Zin Harris; John Reid; Artie Dick; Jack Alabaster	Won
17	Sydney Burke ‡	1 January 1962	Newlands, Cape Town	New Zealand	1	53.5	128	6	2.37	Noel McGregor; John Sparling; Murray Chapple; Artie Dick; Gary Bartlett; Dick Motz	Lost
18	Lance Klusener	27 November 1996	Eden Gardens, Calcutta	India	2	19.0	64	8	1.73	Nayan Mongia; Sourav Ganguly; V. V. S. Laxman; Mohammad Azharuddin; Sunil Joshi; Anil Kumble; Javagal Srinath; Narendra Hirwani	Won
19	Charl Langeveldt	2 January 2005	Newlands, Cape Town	England	1	16.0	46	5	2.87	Michael Vaughan; Graham Thorpe; Geraint Jones; Simon Jones; Steve Harmison	Won
20	Vernon Philander †	9 November 2011	Newlands, Cape Town	Australia	2	7.0	15	5	2.14	Ricky Ponting; Michael Clarke; Brad Haddin; Mitchell Johnson; Shaun Marsh	Won
21	Marchant de Lange	26 December 2011	Kingsmead, Durban	Sri Lanka	1	23.2	81	7	3.47	Tharanga Paranavitana; Kumar Sangakkara; Thilan Samaraweera; Angelo Mathews; Thisara Perera; Rangana Herath; Chanaka Welegedara	Lost
22	Kyle Abbott †	22 February 2013	Centurion Park, Centurion	Pakistan	1	11.4	29	7	2.48	Mohammad Hafeez; Younus Khan; Misbah-ul-Haq; Sarfraz Ahmed; Saeed Ajmal; Ehsan Adil; Mohammad Irfan	Won
23	Lungi Ngidi †	13 January 2017	Centurion Park, Centurion	India	2	12.2	39	6	3.16	K. L. Rahul; Virat Kohli; Hardik Pandya; Ravichandran Ashwin; Mohammed Shami; Jasprit Bumrah	Won
24	Beuran Hendricks	24 January 2020	Wanderers Stadium, Johannesburg	England	2	15.3	64	5	4.12	Dom Sibley; Ben Stokes; Sam Curran; Chris Woakes; Joe Root	Lost
25	Neil Brand	5 February 2024	Bay Oval, Mount Maunganui	New Zealand	1	26.0	119	6	4.58	Daryl Mitchell; Glenn Phillips; Rachin Ravindra; Mitchell Santner; Matt Henry; Tim Southee	Lost
