= List of cricketers who have taken two five-wicket hauls on Test debut =

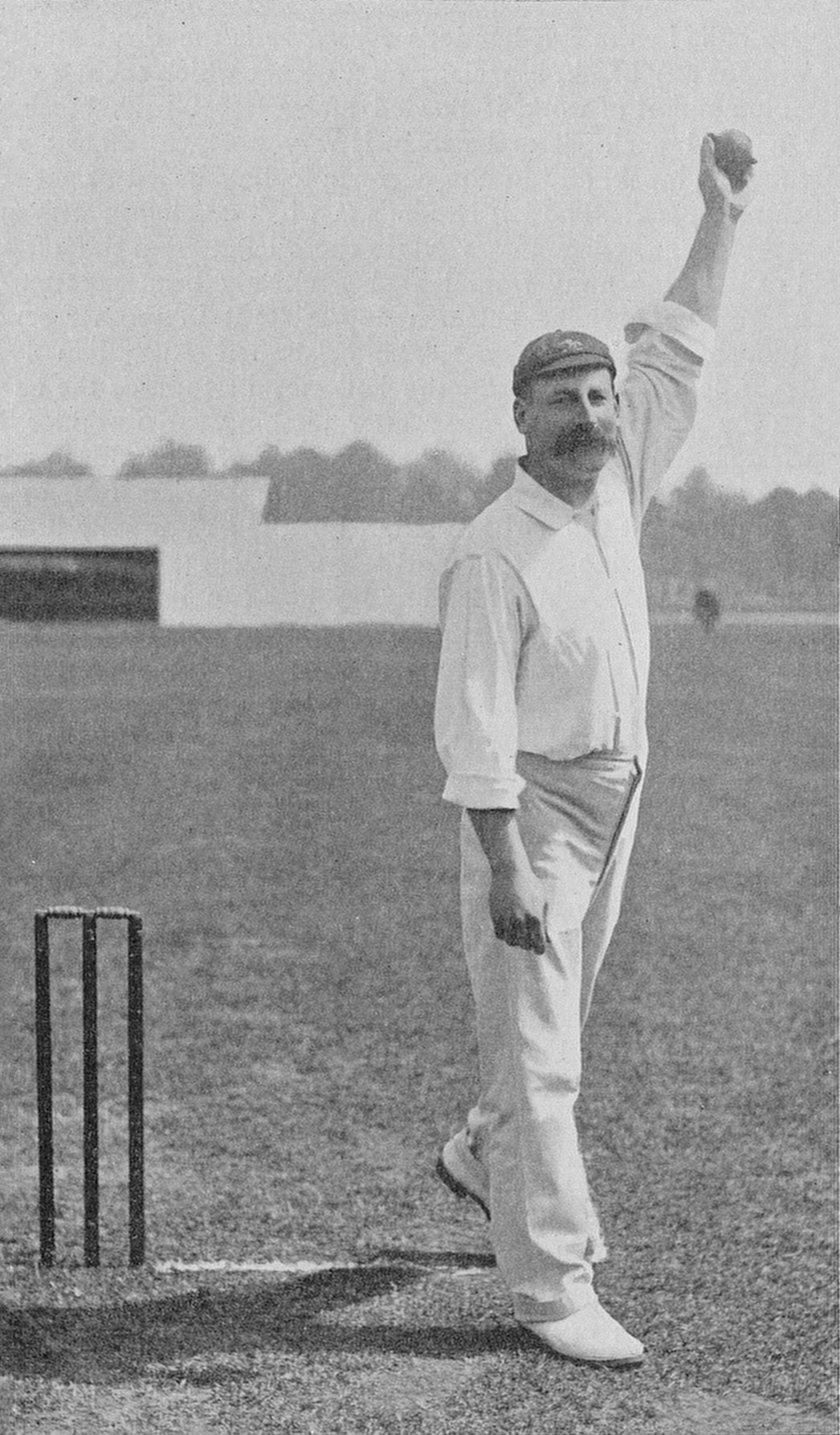
Fred Martin was the first player to take two five wicket hauls on his debut in Test cricket.

In cricket, a five-wicket haul (also known as a "five-for" or "fifer") refers to a bowler taking five or more wickets in a single innings. This is regarded as a significant achievement. As of November 2026, 181 cricketers have taken a five-wicket haul on their debut in a Test match. Of these, twelve cricketers have taken two five-wicket hauls on their Test debut, including five from England, two each from Australia and Sri Lanka, and one each from India, South Africa, and the West Indies.

English left-arm medium-paced bowler Frederick Martin was the first player to do so; he took 6 wickets for 50 and 6 wickets for 52 on his debut, against Australia in the second Test of the 1890 Ashes series. The feat was repeated three years later by Tom Richardson who took 5 for 49 and 5 for 107 against Australia in the third Test of the 1893 Ashes series. Clarrie Grimmett became the first Australian to take two five-wicket hauls on his Test debut, when he took 5 for 45 and 6 for 37 in the fifth Test of the 1924–25 Ashes series at the Sydney Cricket Ground. Charles Marriott was the third England player to take a pair of fifers on his Test debut, against the West Indies on their 1933 tour of England. Despite his bowling performance, Marriott never played Test cricket again.

Ken Farnes took two five-wicket hauls on his debut against Australia in the first Test of the 1934 Ashes series but still ended on the losing side. In 1948, West Indian right-arm fast bowler Hines Johnson was the first cricketer outside an Ashes tournament to take two fifers on his Test debut when he took 5 for 41 and 5 for 55 against England at Sabina Park during England's 1947–48 tour. South African medium-fast bowler Sydney Burke became the seventh player to take a pair of five-wicket hauls on Test debut, with a total of eleven wickets in the third Test of New Zealand tour of 1961–62.

Narendra Hirwani recorded the best match-figures by any bowler on Test debut. He took 8 for 61 and 8 for 75 against West Indies in 1987–88 Test series. As of July 2024, England's fast bowler Gus Atkinson is the most recent cricketer to take two five-wicket hauls on debut. He took 7/45 and 5/61 against West Indies during the first Test of the 2024 series between the teams.

== Key ==
Symbol	Meaning
Date	Date the match was held, or starting date of the match for Test matches
Overs	Number of overs bowled in that innings
Runs	Runs conceded
Wkts	Number of wickets taken
Econ	Bowling economy rate (average runs conceded per over bowled)
Batsmen	The batsmen whose wickets were taken in the five-wicket haul
Result	The result for the bowler's team in that match
†	Bowler selected as "Man of the match"
Drawn	The match was drawn

Note: For the bowling figures, the top line is the first innings bowling figures, and the bottom line is the second innings bowling figures.

== List of cricketers who have taken two five-wicket hauls on Test debut ==
No.	Bowler	Date	Ground	Against	Overs	Runs	Wkts	Econ	Batsmen	Result
1	Frederick Martin	11 August 1890	The Oval, London, United Kingdom	Australia	27 (Note: 5-ball overs were used in this match)	50	6	2.22	Jack Lyons; Jack Barrett; Billy Murdoch; Jack Blackham; Harry Trott; Percie Charlton	Won
1	Frederick Martin	11 August 1890	The Oval, London, United Kingdom	Australia	30.2	52	6	2.05	Jack Barrett; Jack Lyons; Kenneth Burn; Charles Turner; Harry Trott; Hugh Trumble	Won
2	Tom Richardson	24 August 1893	Old Trafford, Manchester, United Kingdom	Australia	23.4	49	5	2.47	George Giffen; Harry Trott; William Bruce; Charles Turner; Hugh Trumble	Drawn
2	Tom Richardson	24 August 1893	Old Trafford, Manchester, United Kingdom	Australia	44	107	5	2.91	George Giffen; Bob McLeod; William Bruce; Syd Gregory; Alick Bannerman	Drawn
3	Clarrie Grimmett	7 February 1925	Sydney Cricket Ground, Sydney, Australia	England	11.7 (Note: 8-ball overs were used in this match.)	45	5	2.84	Frank Woolley; J. W. Hearne; William Whysall; Roy Kilner; Arthur Gilligan	Won
3	Clarrie Grimmett	7 February 1925	Sydney Cricket Ground, Sydney, Australia	England	19.4	37	6	1.42	Jack Hobbs; Andy Sandham; Patsy Hendren; J. W. Hearne; William Whysall; Bert Strudwick	Won
4	Charles Marriott	12 August 1933	The Oval, London, United Kingdom	West Indies	11.5	37	5	3.12	George Headley; Cyril Merry; Jackie Grant; Vincent Valentine; Herman Griffith	Won
4	Charles Marriott	12 August 1933	The Oval, London, United Kingdom	West Indies	29.2	59	6	2.01	Clifford Roach; Ben Sealey; Oscar Da Costa; Vincent Valentine; Ellis Achong; Herman Griffith	Won
5	Ken Farnes	8 June 1934	Trent Bridge, Nottingham, United Kingdom	Australia	40.2	102	5	2.52	Bill Ponsford; Bill Woodfull; Stan McCabe; Arthur Chipperfield; Bill O'Reilly	Lost
5	Ken Farnes	8 June 1934	Trent Bridge, Nottingham, United Kingdom	Australia	25	77	5	3.08	Bill Woodfull; Don Bradman; Stan McCabe; Len Darling; Arthur Chipperfield	Lost
6	Hines Johnson	27 March 1948	Sabina Park, Kingston, Jamaica	England	34.5	41	5	2.52	Jack Robertson; Len Hutton; Ken Cranston; Jim Laker; Maurice Tremlett	Won
6	Hines Johnson	27 March 1948	Sabina Park, Kingston, Jamaica	England	31	55	5	1.77	Jack Robertson; Joe Hardstaff, Jr.; Gubby Allen; Godfrey Evans; Maurice Tremlett	Won
7	Sydney Burke	1 January 1962	Newlands, Cape Town, South Africa	New Zealand	53.5	128	6	2.37	John Sparling; Noel McGregor; Murray Chapple; Artie Dick; Dick Motz; Gary Bartlett	Lost
7	Sydney Burke	1 January 1962	Newlands, Cape Town, South Africa	New Zealand	27.1	68	5	2.55	Graham Dowling; John Sparling; John Richard Reid; Zin Harris; Murray Chapple	Lost
8	Bob Massie	22 June 1972	Lord's, London, United Kingdom	England	32.5	84	8	2.55	Geoffrey Boycott; Basil D'Oliveira; Mike Smith; Alan Knott; Tony Greig; Ray Illingworth; John Snow; Norman Gifford	Won
8	Bob Massie	22 June 1972	Lord's, London, United Kingdom	England	27.2	53	8	2.38	John Edrich; Basil D'Oliveira; Tony Greig; Alan Knott; Ray Illingworth; John Snow; Mike Smith; John Price	Won
9	Narendra Hirwani	11 January 1988	M. A. Chidambaram Stadium, Madras, India	West Indies	18.3	61	8	3.29	Richie Richardson; Gus Logie; Carl Hooper; Viv Richards; Clyde Butts; Jeff Dujon; Winston Davis; Courtney Walsh	Won
9	Narendra Hirwani	11 January 1988	M. A. Chidambaram Stadium, Madras, India	West Indies	15.2	75	8	4.89	Phil Simmons; Desmond Haynes; Viv Richards; Carl Hooper; Jeff Dujon; Gus Logie; Clyde Butts; Winston Davis	Won
10	(Sri Lanka) Praveen Jayawickrama†	3 May 2021	Pallekele International Cricket Stadium, Kandy, Sri Lanka	Bangladesh	32	92	6	2.88	Tamim Iqbal; Saif Hassan; Mushfiqur Rahim; Liton Das; Mehidy Hasan; Taskin Ahmed	Won
10	(Sri Lanka) Praveen Jayawickrama†	3 May 2021	Pallekele International Cricket Stadium, Kandy, Sri Lanka	Bangladesh	32	86	5	2.69	Saif Hassan; Najmul Hossain; Liton Das; Mehidy Hasan; Abu Jayed	Won
11	(Sri Lanka) Prabath Jayasuriya†	11 July 2022	Galle International Stadium, Galle, Sri Lanka	Australia	36	118	6	3.27	Marnus Labuschagne; Travis Head; Cameron Green; Alex Carey; Mitchell Starc; Nathan Lyon	Won
11	(Sri Lanka) Prabath Jayasuriya†	11 July 2022	Galle International Stadium, Galle, Sri Lanka	Australia	16	59	6	3.68	Usman Khawaja; Marnus Labuschagne; Steven Smith; Cameron Green; Mitchell Starc; Mitchell Swepson	Won
12	(England) Gus Atkinson†	10 July 2024	Lord's, London, England	West Indies	12	45	7	3.75	Kraigg Brathwaite; Kirk McKenzie; Alick Athanaze; Jason Holder; Joshua Da Silva; Alzarri Joseph; Shamar Joseph	Won
12	(England) Gus Atkinson†	10 July 2024	Lord's, London, England	West Indies	14	61	5	4.35	Kavem Hodge; Jason Holder; Alzarri Joseph; Shamar Joseph; Jayden Seales	Won
Source: Correct as of 14 July 2024
