= Frank Cameron =

New Zealand cricketer (1932–2023)

Frank Cameron MBE
Personal information
- Full name: Francis James Cameron
- Born: 1 June 1932; Dunedin, Otago, New Zealand
- Died: 2 January 2023 (aged 90); Christchurch, New Zealand
- Batting: Right-handed
- Bowling: Right-arm fast medium

International information
- National side: New Zealand (1961–1965)
- Test debut (cap 90): 8 December 1961 v South Africa
- Last Test: 22 June 1965 v England

Domestic team information
- Years: Team
- 1952/53–1966/67: Otago

Career statistics
Competition	Test	First-class
Matches	19	119
Runs scored	116	993
Batting average	11.60	11.82
100s/50s	0/0	0/0
Top score	27*	43
Balls bowled	4,570	26,959
Wickets	62	447
Bowling average	29.82	21.60
5 wickets in innings	3	21
10 wickets in match	0	0
Best bowling	5/34	7/27
Catches/stumpings	2/–	26/–
- Source: Cricinfo, 1 April 2017

Francis James Cameron MBE (1 June 1932 – 2 January 2023) was a New Zealand cricketer who played 19 Tests for New Zealand as a fast bowler.

Cameron took three five-wicket-hauls in an innings during his Test career for New Zealand, two of them during his first tour against South Africa in 1961–62, where New Zealand drew 2–2 in the five–Test series. During that series, he was dismissed once in nine innings, and finished with a batting average of 17. In 30 Test innings, he ended up not out in two thirds of them, which might have contributed to his career batting average of 11.6 – he only made it into double figures three times with the bat.

== Early life and family ==
Cameron was born in Dunedin on 1 June 1932, and educated at Christian Brothers' High School. He went on to study at the University of Otago, and completed a Bachelor of Arts degree in 1957.

== International career ==
Cameron made his Test debut at Kingsmead in Durban along with five other New Zealanders, and took six wickets in that first match, more than any other New Zealand bowler bar Jack Alabaster. However, though his bowling helped to keep the winning target down to 197, New Zealand lost the match by 30 runs after Peter Pollock took six for 38 in reply. In the second Test, Cameron celebrated his first five-wicket-haul, which included a brace of wickets of South Africa's number four and five. Cameron also dismissed South Africa's number three and six on his way to five for 83, but South Africa took a lead of 99 on first innings of the four-day match. After thirteen wicketless overs in the second innings, Cameron was not required to bat as New Zealand batted out 68 overs for the draw.

Cameron got a five-wicket-haul in the next match as well, taking five for 48 as South Africa were bowled out for 190, 195 behind New Zealand's first innings total. Cameron was then part of an unbeaten 49-run tenth-wicket partnership with wicket-keeper Artie Dick, before New Zealand declared, setting a target of 408 for South Africa to chase in a little over a day of the four-day match. After Alabaster had taken the first three wickets, South Africa were 315 for 5 before Cameron got his first wicket of the innings – dismissing Kim Elgie for 12. Still, he bowled economically, conceding 42 from his 26 overs, with only captain John R. Reid having a lower economy rate, and with the help of Reid's two wickets at the end South Africa were bowled out for 335, giving New Zealand their first Test win away from home.

With the series tied at 1–1 with two matches to go, New Zealand had a shout at gaining their first series win. That was quickly quenched – Cameron bowled 30 wicketless overs in the fourth Test at the Wanderers, and New Zealand's batting yielded twice as South Africa registered a win by an innings and 51 runs. Still, New Zealand drew the series, after Cameron took the final wicket in the fifth test. His match bowling figures then read 28.5–7–94–2, but with the final ball of the over he had South Africa's number 11 Harry Bromfield caught. Bromfield had been batting for the past half hour without scoring a run, though he had been in a partnership of 14 with 55 runs required for the win or 21 minutes required for the draw. Thus, Cameron finished his maiden Test series with 20 wickets at a bowling average of 24.65.

Cameron's next series was against England at home in 1962–63, but it was not as successful, as the team suffered two innings defeats and a seven-wicket loss as they were whitewashed 0–3. Cameron got eight wickets in the series, including four for 118 in the first Test, where he was the only New Zealand bowler to take more than one wicket.

South Africa came to tour New Zealand the next summer, but in three drawn Tests Cameron failed to take more than three wickets in any innings, and ended with nine wickets at the average of 35.22. Another 0–0 series followed the next summer, against Pakistan, though Cameron registered his best match figures of nine for 70 in the second Test. Chasing 220 to win in four hours, however, New Zealand were set back by Pervez Sajjad, who took four wickets for no runs in ten balls to set New Zealand back from 102 for 2 to 102 for 6, and they closed on 166 for 7. In the third Test, New Zealand were set 314 in 83 overs, and batted out to draw the series.

New Zealand played seven Tests on the subcontinent that summer, four in India and three in Pakistan, but Cameron only played one of the India games – the final Test at the Feroz Shah Kotla. After three drawn Tests had opened the series, Cameron took one for 86 as India took a 203-run lead on first innings, and though Cameron made a career-best 27 not out in a 51-run ninth-wicket stand with Richard Collinge, India were set a target of 70. Cameron was taken for 29 in four overs, and though he dismissed M. L. Jaisimha hit wicket, India won by seven wickets.

The tour of Pakistan saw New Zealand lose the first Test by an innings and 64 runs after falling to 79 in their second innings, and Cameron was brought into the team in place of Bryan Yuile. He took six wickets for 105 in the match, but Pakistan still drew the game – before winning the third Test after chasing down 202 to win. Cameron failed to take a wicket in the chase, though his 108-minute last-wicket stand of 63 with Bevan Congdon was a New Zealand tenth-wicket record.

Cameron went on one last tour – aged 33, he went to England in the 1965 season and played two of the three Tests there. After bowling figures of 32–5–122–0 in a tour match against Warwickshire, Cameron was left out of the team to play the third Test. He did play the last three tour matches against Scotland, Ireland and Netherlands, taking 19 wickets, but was never selected again for Test cricket, and retired after the 1966–67 season.

== Post-playing career ==
Cameron served as a New Zealand selector from 1968 to 1986, and as chairman of the selection panel from 1975 to 1986. He also served as match referee in three Tests and five One Day Internationals.

A schoolteacher, Cameron rose to become deputy principal of Otago Boys' High School. In 1983, he married Linley Rose Waters.

In the 1987 New Year Honours, Cameron was appointed a Member of the Order of the British Empire, for services to cricket.

Cameron died in Christchurch on 2 January 2023, aged 90.
