= Sydney Burke =

South African cricketer

Personal information
- Full name: Sydney Frank Burke
- Born: 11 March 1934; Pretoria, South Africa
- Died: 3 April 2017 (aged 83)
- Batting: Right-handed
- Bowling: Right-arm fast-medium
- Role: All-rounder

International information
- National side: South Africa
- Test debut (cap 212): 1 January 1962 v New Zealand
- Last Test: 6 January 1965 v England

Domestic team information
- Years: Team
- 1954/55–1967/68: North Eastern Transvaal
- 1957/58–1960/61: Orange Free State

Career statistics
Competition	Test	First-class
Matches	2	58
Runs scored	42	2,334
Batting average	14.00	26.52
100s/50s	0/0	1/11
Top score	20	111
Balls bowled	660	12,815
Wickets	11	241
Bowling average	23.36	21.38
5 wickets in innings	2	12
10 wickets in match	1	4
Best bowling	6/128	7/11
Catches/stumpings	0/–	24/–
- Source: CricketArchive, 30 April 2021

Sydney Frank Burke (11 March 1934 – 3 April 2017) was a South African cricketer who played in two Test matches, one in each of 1962 and 1965.

== Biography ==
Born in Pretoria, Transvaal, Burke was a middle to lower order right-handed batsman and a fast-medium right-arm bowler who played first-class cricket mainly for North Eastern Transvaal and Orange Free State between 1954 and 1968. Both of his main first-class sides competed in the weaker B section of the national Currie Cup competition, and Burke's batting and bowling success at that level did not bring recognition until, in the 1961–62 season, injuries to other bowlers and a willingness among the selectors to try new players brought him into the Test team for the third game in a five-match series with New Zealand.

The move was a personal success, though South Africa lost the match. Burke took six wickets for 128 runs in New Zealand's first innings and five for 68 in the second to finish with match figures of 11 for 196. These are the second-best match figures in a South African bowler making his Test debut, beaten only by the 11 for 112 of Alf Hall against England in 1922–23. Further hampered by injury to fellow fast bowler Godfrey Lawrence, Burke bowled 81 overs in the match. Wisden noted that he bowled in the first innings with "commendable steadiness" as New Zealand made 385, and that in the second innings "the accredited batsmen failed to master Burke's in-swinger". It added: "He shouldered a tremendous burden and virtually bowled himself to a standstill."

Despite this performance, Burke was dropped for the next Test in favour of Peter Heine, who had not played Test cricket for three years, and when that did not prove successful the selectors recalled Neil Adcock and Peter Pollock for the final match of the series.

In the 1963–64 season, Burke was not picked for the South African tour to Australia, but as captain of North Eastern Transvaal had his best bowling season in domestic cricket, taking 35 wickets an average of just 8.45 runs apiece. He was mentioned in Wisden among a group of players who had failed to make the Australian tour but "gave indications of their intention to renew their claims". That he was still in the selectors' thoughts was demonstrated by his selection for the Test trial match at the start of the 1964–65 season, when England were the tourists, though in a one-sided match he failed to take a wicket.

Exactly three years after his previous triumphant Test appearance, Burke was again picked for the third Test of the series against England. This time, he was not a success, failing to take a wicket in a drawn match which was noted for some dull batting. Again, he lost his place after the single Test match, and this time he did not regain it.

He managed the successful South African Universities team that toured England in 1967. The Wisden report said, "No praise could be too high for Mr S.F. Burke, who combined the onerous managerial duties with those of a shrewd and helpful coach."

== See also ==
- List of South Africa cricketers who have taken five-wicket hauls on Test debut
