= George Parry =

George Parry may refer to:

- George Parry (cricketer) (1794–1872), English amateur cricketer
- George Parry (MP) (1600–1660), English lawyer and politician
- George Herbert Parry (1882–1951), Western Australian architect
- George Parry (Ontario politician) (1889–1968), Canadian politician
- George Parry (umpire) (1908-1979), South African cricket umpire
