= International cricket in 1958 =

International cricket season

The 1958 International cricket season was from April 1958 to August 1958, which consisted only a single international tour.

== Season overview ==
International tours
Start date	Home team	Away team	Results [Matches]			
Start date	Home team	Away team	Test	ODI	FC	LA
4 June 1959	England	New Zealand	4–0 [5]	—	—	—

== June ==
=== New Zealand in England ===
Test series
No.	Date	Home captain	Away captain	Venue	Result
Test 454	5–9 June	Peter May	John Reid	Edgbaston Cricket Ground, Birmingham	England by 205 runs
Test 455	19–21 June	Peter May	John Reid	Lord's, London	England by an innings and 148 runs
Test 456	3–8 July	Peter May	John Reid	Headingley Cricket Ground, Leeds	England by an innings and 71 runs
Test 457	24–29 July	Peter May	John Reid	Old Trafford Cricket Ground, Manchester	England by an innings and 13 runs
Test 458	21–26 August	Peter May	John Reid	Kennington Oval, London	Match drawn
