= Gobo Ashley =

South African cricketer (1862–1930)

Personal information
- Full name: William Hare Ashley
- Born: 7 April 1878; Mowbray, Cape Town, Cape Colony
- Died: 14 July 1930 (aged 52); Plumtree, Southern Rhodesia
- Batting: Right-handed
- Bowling: Left-arm medium

International information
- National side: South Africa
- Only Test (cap 12): 25 March 1889 v England

Domestic team information
- Years: Team
- 1890–91: Western Province

Career statistics
Competition	Tests	First-class
Matches	1	4
Runs scored	1	17
Batting average	0.50	4.25
100s/50s	0/0	0/0
Top score	1	15*
Balls bowled	173	833
Wickets	7	20
Bowling average	13.57	14.09
5 wickets in innings	1	2
10 wickets in match	0	0
Best bowling	7/95	7/95
Catches/stumpings	0/–	1/–
- Source: Cricinfo

William Hare "Gobo" Ashley (10 February 1862 – 14 July 1930) was a South African cricketer who played in one Test in 1889, the second Test ever played by his country.

A left-arm medium-paced bowler, Ashley took 7 for 95 in the only Test innings he bowled in, becoming the second South African to take a five-wicket haul after Albert Rose-Innes during that inaugural South African Test earlier in the year. Ashley later played three first-class matches for a Cape Town Clubs team and Western Province in South African domestic cricket in 1890 and 1891, taking 13 wickets. He was a member of Western Province team that won the 1890–91 Champion Bat Tournament, when he opened the bowling with Voltelin van der Bijl.

== See also ==
- List of South Africa cricketers who have taken five-wicket hauls on Test debut
- One Test Wonder
