= New Zealand cricket team in India in 1964–65 =

International cricket tour

| | New Zealand | India |
- Dates: 27 February – 22 March 1965
| Captains | John Reid | Nawab of Pataudi, Jr. |

Test series
- Result: India won the 4-match series 1–0
| Most runs | Bert Sutcliffe (335); Ross Morgan (260); Graham Dowling (236) | Chandu Borde (371); Dilip Sardesai (360); Nawab of Pataudi, Jr. (316) |
| Most wickets | Bruce Taylor (15); Dick Motz (7); Bryan Yuile (6) | S Venkataraghavan (21); Ramakant Desai (13); Salim Durani (9) |

The New Zealand cricket team toured India in the 1964-65 cricket season. They played four Test matches against the Indian cricket team, with India winning one match and the other three being drawn.

== Background ==
New Zealand travelled to India after a three-match drawn Test series against Pakistan at home. The Indian Express pointed out that one of the "several lessons" they learnt from the series was the lack of genuine spin bowlers. In this regard, Vic Pollard and Graham Vivian were included in the squad to support left-arm spinner Bryan Yuile. It also added that "lapses in temperament" and a "shortage of batsmen with stroke and enterprise" were the two other weaknesses in the side. On the positives, their fast bowlers were in good form, alongside batsmen Ross Morgan and John Reid. The latter were to be complemented by Bert Sutcliffe, once considered the best left-handed batsman in the world. Before the series, captain John Reid mentioned that it was "hard going straight into the series without a loosening up match in Indian conditions." However, he rated his team better than the one that toured the country in 1955–56.

== Squads ==
=== Touring party ===
A 15-member New Zealand squad for the tour of India, Pakistan and England was announced by the New Zealand Cricket on 14 February 1965. John Reid was named the captain and Graham Dowling, his deputy. Bert Sutcliffe made a comeback to the side coming out of retirement after five years. Four players — Terry Jarvis, Vic Pollard, Bruce Taylor and Graham Vivian — made the squad for the time. The team manager for the tour was Walter Hadlee. The party arrived in Madras, the venue of the First test, on 24 February.

The team members were:

- John Reid, Wellington, captain & all-rounder
- Graham Dowling, Canterbury, vice-captain & opening batsman
- Frank Cameron, Otago, fast-medium bowler
- Richard Collinge, Central Districts, fast-medium bowler
- Bevan Congdon, Central Districts, all-rounder
- Terry Jarvis, Auckland, opening batsman
- Ross Morgan, Auckland, batsman
- Dick Motz, Canterbury, fast-medium bowler
- Vic Pollard, Central Districts, all-rounder
- Barry Sinclair, Wellington, batsman
- Bert Sutcliffe, Northern Districts, batsman
- Bruce Taylor, Canterbury, fast-medium bowler
- Graham Vivian, Canterbury, batsman and leg break bowler
- John Ward, Canterbury, wicket-keeper
- Bryan Yuile, Central Districts, left arm orthodox bowler

=== India squad ===
The Indian selectors picked the same squad that played Australia at home earlier that season, with the exception of Indrajitsinhji, who was replaced by Farokh Engineer as the wicket-keeper in the playing eleven. The former was included in the reserves. The Nawab of Pataudi Jr. was retained as the captain. The squad was announced on 15 February 1965.

The team members were:

- Nawab of Pataudi Jr., captain
- Chandu Borde
- BS Chandrasekhar
- Ramakant Desai
- Salim Durani
- Farokh Engineer, wicket-keeper
- Indrajitsinhji, wicket-keeper
- ML Jaisimha
- Vijay Manjrekar
- Bapu Nadkarni
- Dilip Sardesai
- Ramesh Saxena
- Hanumant Singh
- Venkataraman Subramanya
- S. Venkataraghavan

== Series summary ==
=== First Test ===
27 February–2 March 1965
(4-day match)
Scorecard

| India | v | New Zealand |
| 397 (143.5 overs); Farokh Engineer 90; Dick Motz 3/87 (30 overs) | | 315 (179 overs); Bert Sutcliffe 56; Salim Durani 3/53 (45 overs) |
| 199/2d (58.1 overs); Vijay Manjrekar 102*; Vic Pollard 1/32 (14 overs) | | 62/0 (21 overs); Terry Jarvis 40*; Salim Durani 0/4 (1 over) |

Match drawn
Nehru Stadium, Madras
Umpires: Mohammad Yunus (Ind) and SK Raghunatha Rao (Ind)

- India won the toss and elected to bat.
- S. Venkataraghavan (IND), and Terry Jarvis and Vic Pollard (both NZ) made their Test debuts.

=== Second Test ===
5–8 March 1965
(4-day match)
Scorecard

| New Zealand | v | India |
| 462/9d (160 overs); Bert Sutcliffe 151*; Ramakant Desai 4/128 (33 overs) | | 380 (105.5 overs); Nawab of Pataudi, Jr. 153; Bruce Taylor 5/86 (23.5 overs) |
| 191/9d (91.1 overs); Vic Pollard 43; Graham Vivian 43; S Venkataraghavan 3/15 (17 overs) | | 92/3 (17 overs); Farokh Engineer 45; Graham Vivian 1/14 (3 overs) |

Match drawn
Eden Gardens, Calcutta
Umpires: Santosh Ganguli (Ind) and Bapu Joshi (Ind)

- New Zealand won the toss and elected to bat.
- Bruce Taylor and Graham Vivian (both NZ) made their Test debuts. Taylor scored his first century and claimed his first five-wicket haul in Tests.

=== Third Test ===
12–15 March 1965
(4-day match)
Scorecard

| New Zealand | v | India |
| 297 (129.2 overs); Graham Dowling 129; Ramakant Desai 6/56 (25 overs) | | 88 (33.3 overs); Chandu Borde 25; Bruce Taylor 5/26 (7.3 overs) |
| 80/8 (43 overs); Bruce Taylor 21; BS Chandrasekhar 3/25 (14 overs) | | 463/5d (f/o) (154.4 overs); Dilip Sardesai 200*; Bruce Taylor 3/76 (29 overs) |

Match drawn
Brabourne Stadium, Bombay
Umpires: M. V. Nagendra (Ind) and Samar Roy (Ind)

- New Zealand won the toss and elected to bat.
- Graham Dowling (NZ) and Dilip Sardesai (Ind) scored their first centuries in Tests.
- India's first innings total of 88 was their lowest at home, before they were dismissed for 75 against the West Indies in 1987.

=== Fourth Test ===
19–22 March 1965
(4-day match)
Scorecard

| New Zealand | v | India |
| 262 (125.1 overs); Ross Morgan 82; S Venkataraghavan 8/72 (51.1 overs) | | 465/8d (113.4 overs); Nawab of Pataudi, Jr. 113; Richard Collinge 4/89 (20.4 overs) |
| 272 (149.2 overs); Terry Jarvis 77; S Venkataraghavan 4/80 (61.2 overs) | | 73/3 (9.1 overs); Nawab of Pataudi, Jr. 29; Frank Cameron 1/29 (4 overs) |

India won by 7 wickets
Feroz Shah Kotla Ground, Delhi
Umpires: Sambhu Pan (Ind) and B. Satyaji Rao (Ind)

- New Zealand won the toss and elected to bat.
- Venkataraman Subramanya (Ind) made his Test debut.
- Dilip Sardesai (Ind) passed 1,000 runs in Tests.
