= Richard Reid (cricketer) =

New Zealand cricketer

Personal information
- Full name: Richard Bruce Reid
- Born: 3 December 1958 (age 67); Lower Hutt, Wellington
- Batting: Right-handed
- Bowling: Right-arm medium
- Relatives: John Reid (father)

International information
- National side: New Zealand (1988–1991)
- ODI debut (cap 62): 9 March 1988 v England
- Last ODI: 16 February 1991 v England

Domestic team information
- Years: Team
- 1979/80–1984/85: Wellington
- 1981/82: Transvaal B
- 1985/86–1989/90: Auckland
- 1990/91–1991/92: Wellington

Career statistics
Competition	ODI	FC	LA
Matches	9	43	47
Runs scored	248	1,789	1,376
Batting average	27.55	24.84	30.57
100s/50s	0/2	1/11	0/12
Top score	64	107	97
Balls bowled	7	24	7
Wickets	1	2	1
Bowling average	13.00	7.00	13.00
5 wickets in innings	0	0	0
10 wickets in match	0	0	0
Best bowling	1/13	2/5	1/13
Catches/stumpings	3/–	27/–	12/–
- Source: Cricinfo, 13 May 2017

Richard Bruce Reid (born 3 December 1958) is a former New Zealand international cricketer, who played nine One Day Internationals between 1988 and 1991. His father, John Reid, played Test cricket for New Zealand from 1949 to 1965.

== Life and career ==
Reid was born in Lower Hutt, Wellington. He attended Scots College, Wellington, where he captained the first XI. He had two moderately successful seasons with the Wellington cricket team before going to Johannesburg, where his parents were living.

Reid taught physical education and mathematics at St John's College in Johannesburg and played one first-class cricket match for Transvaal B. Later he worked for Nike in South Africa. In the mid-1980s, after visiting the New Zealand cricketers who were touring Zimbabwe in October 1984, he decided to return to New Zealand and resume his cricket career.

Reid settled in Auckland in 1985 and played with some success for the Auckland cricket team. He acted as liaison officer with the touring Australian team in 1986. He married Debbie Kittow in April 1989.

In 1990 Reid returned to Wellington to work as a sales representative for Nike New Zealand. Opening the batting in one-day matches for Wellington, he was the highest scorer in the 1990–91 Shell Cup competition, with 348 runs at an average of 69.60 and a scoring rate of 109.77 runs per 100 balls faced. He was included in the New Zealand team for the World Series in Australia that season, and was New Zealand's top-scorer in the second final with 64. A few days later he was the top-scorer on either side with 47 from 44 balls when Wellington won the final of the Shell Cup.

Reid's form fell away after that season and he played no more international cricket. His last season of domestic cricket was 1991–92.

Reid worked as chief executive officer of Nike New Zealand until 2001, when he began a career in cricket and rugby administration.
