= Stephen Lawrence (footballer) =

Australian rules footballer

Personal information
- Born: 22 April 1969 (age 57); South Africa
- Original team: Morningside
- Debut: 1988, Hawthorn vs. North Melbourne, at the MCG
- Height: 202 cm (6 ft 8 in)
- Weight: 120 kg (265 lb)

Playing career^{1}
Years	Club	Games (Goals)
1988–1998	Hawthorn	146 (30)
- ^{1} Playing statistics correct to the end of 1998.

Career highlights
- 1991 Premiership player

Stephen Lawrence (born 22 April 1969) is a former Australian rules footballer who played for Hawthorn in the Australian Football League.

== Early life ==
Lawrence was born in 1969 to Jennifer and Godfrey Lawrence in South Africa. His father, originally from Southern Rhodesia had played Test cricket for South Africa during the early 1960s. The family moved to Australia in the 1970s, initially to Wollongong, then to Brisbane.

== Playing career ==
Lawrence took up Australian rules football with Mount Gravatt. He later played for Morningside before joining Hawthorn in 1987.

A ruckman throughout his career, he debuted at centre half forward in 1988 and kicked 5 goals against North Melbourne in his first game. The following week he was injured and didn't play again that year.

He started to get a regular game in 1990 as back-up for Greg Dear, and after Dear was injured during the 1991 pre-season he became number one ruckman. He played in the State of Origin and won best player of the finals in 1991.

Lawrence retired towards the end of the 1998 AFL season.
