= John Ferrandi =

South African cricketer (1930–2019)

Personal information
- Full name: John Heynes Ferrandi
- Born: 3 April 1930; Villiersdorp, Cape Province, South Africa
- Died: 16 September 2019 (aged 89); Cape Town, Western Cape, South Africa
- Batting: Right-handed
- Role: Wicketkeeper

Domestic team information
- Years: Team
- 1949/50–1964/65: Western Province

Career statistics
Competition	First-class
Matches	60
Runs scored	2,012
Batting average	23.39
100s/50s	0/13
Top score	89
Catches/stumpings	122/32
- Source: Cricinfo, 4 December 2017

John Heynes Ferrandi (3 April 1930 – 16 September 2019) was a South African cricketer who played first-class cricket for Western Province from 1949 to 1964.

Principally a wicket-keeper, Ferrandi was also a useful batsman. Selected to play for a South African XI against the Australians in 1957–58, he scored 62 and 30 (the top score of the innings). His highest first-class score was 89, which was also Western Province's highest score in the match against Natal in 1955–56. Against the New Zealanders in 1961–62 he made 81 not out (Western Province's highest score in the match) and 25 not out, hitting hard and excelling in his footwork, his strokes through mid-wicket and his late cutting. In 1960–61 he was the leading stumper in South Africa, executing seven stumpings, most of them off the leg-spin bowling of John Commins.
