= Robin Thorne (cricketer) =

South African cricketer

Personal information
- Full name: Robin Kidger Thorne
- Born: 4 April 1930; Port Elizabeth, South Africa
- Died: 20 April 2017 (aged 87); Sonning, Berkshire, England
- Batting: Right-handed
- Bowling: Right-arm medium
- Role: All-rounder

Domestic team information
- Years: Team
- 1948/49–1964/65: Border

Career statistics
Competition	FC
Matches	44
Runs scored	1,751
Batting average	23.66
100s/50s	1/11
Top score	100
Balls bowled	10,631
Wickets	164
Bowling average	20.00
5 wickets in innings	9
10 wickets in match	3
Best bowling	8/101
Catches/stumpings	26/–
- Source: Cricinfo, 21 April 2024

Robin Kidger Thorne (4 April 1930 – 20 April 2017) was a South African cricketer. He played in 44 first-class matches, mostly for Border, from 1948–49 to 1964–65.

Thorne was a right-arm pace bowler and useful lower-order batsman. His best first-class bowling figures were 8 for 101 against the touring New Zealanders in 1961–62. His best figures in the Currie Cup were 7 for 40 against Rhodesia in 1959–60. His only century came against Orange Free State in 1962–63, when he scored exactly 100.

In his first first-class match, aged 18, against the touring MCC in 1948–49, Thorne's first wicket was of Len Hutton, bowled. In his last first-class match, 16 years later, also against a touring MCC team, his last first-class wicket was of Mike Brearley, also bowled.

Thorne coached for many years in South Africa, much of the time in the black townships, before settling in England.
