= Desmond Fell =

South African cricketer and umpire (1912–1992)

Personal information
- Full name: Desmond Robert Fell
- Born: 16 December 1912; Pietermaritzburg, Natal, South Africa
- Died: 22 January 1992 (aged 79); Durban, Natal, South Africa
- Batting: Left-handed
- Bowling: Right-arm off-break

Domestic team information
- Years: Team
- 1931/32–1949/50: Natal

Career statistics
| Competition | First-class |
|---|---|
| Matches | 39 |
| Runs scored | 1,958 |
| Batting average | 31.58 |
| 100s/50s | 5/8 |
| Top score | 161 |
| Catches/stumpings | 14/– |
- Source: Cricinfo, 3 December 2020

Desmond Robert Fell (16 December 1912 – 22 January 1992) was a South African cricketer who played first-class cricket for Natal either side of the Second World War, and later became a Test cricket umpire.

== Biography ==
Fell was born in Pietermaritzburg, where he attended Maritzburg College. He represented South African Schools in a match against the touring MCC team in March 1931. He made his first-class debut the next season.

Fell's most successful first-class season was 1946–47, when he scored 496 first-class runs at 49.60, including two centuries, the higher of these being the career-best 161 he hit against Rhodesia. He also passed 400 runs in 1937–38, but after that his highest aggregate was the 219 runs he accumulated in 1947–48.

Fell's only first-class match outside South Africa was the game he played for Dominions against England at Lord's in late August 1945; he made 12 and 28 in what was the first first-class match to be played in England after the end of the Second World War.

After his retirement from playing, Fell umpired 14 first-class matches in the 1950s and 1960s, almost all involving Natal. The two exceptions were the first Test between South Africa and New Zealand at Durban in 1961–62, and a non-Test game between a South African XI and the Australians at Pietermaritzburg in 1966–67.
