= Kenneth Walter =

South African cricketer (1939–2003)

Personal information
- Full name: Kenneth Alexander Walter
- Born: 5 November 1939; Johannesburg, Transvaal, South Africa
- Died: 13 September 2003 (aged 63); Sandton, Johannesburg, South Africa
- Batting: Right-handed
- Bowling: Right-arm fast

International information
- National side: South Africa
- Test debut: 8 December 1961 v New Zealand
- Last Test: 26 December 1961 v New Zealand

Career statistics
Competition	Tests	First-class
Matches	2	50
Runs scored	11	594
Batting average	3.66	13.50
100s/50s	0/0	0/1
Top score	10	55
Balls bowled	495	11,263
Wickets	6	217
Bowling average	32.83	21.22
5 wickets in innings	0	9
10 wickets in match	0	1
Best bowling	4/63	6/45
Catches/stumpings	3/–	34/–
- Source: Cricinfo, 6 October 2020

Kenneth Alexander Walter (5 November 1939 – 13 September 2003) was a South African cricketer who played in two Tests in 1961.
