= Ian Fullerton =

South African cricketer

Personal information
- Full name: Ian Ramsay Fullerton
- Born: 24 September 1935; Kensington, Johannesburg, Transvaal, South Africa
- Died: 6 December 2020 (aged 85); Johannesburg, Gauteng, South Africa
- Batting: Right-handed

Domestic team information
- Years: Team
- 1958/59–1965/66: Transvaal

Career statistics
Competition	First-class
Matches	31
Runs scored	1,853
Batting average	34.31
100s/50s	5/8
Top score	145
Balls bowled	12
Wickets	0
Bowling average	–
5 wickets in innings	–
10 wickets in match	–
Best bowling	–
Catches/stumpings	11/–
- Source: CricketArchive, 12 August 2014

Ian Ramsay Fullerton (24 September 1935 – 6 December 2020) was a South African cricketer who played first-class cricket from 1958 to 1965.

Fullerton made his first-class debut for Transvaal in 1958–59 as an opening or number-three batsman, and played five matches over the next three seasons with moderate success. He toured England in 1961 with the South African Fezela XI of promising young players, scoring his first century, 103, in the innings victory over Combined Services.

He opened the batting for a South African Colts XI against the touring New Zealanders in 1961–62, top-scoring with 35 in the second innings. He was Transvaal's leading scorer in the 1962–63 Currie Cup, with 502 runs at an average of 45.63. He made his highest score, 145, in the innings victory over Western Province, adding 207 for the second wicket with Peter Carlstein.

He scored 425 runs at 38.63 in the 1963–64 season, with two centuries. In 1964–65 he played in a trial match before the series against the touring English team, but made a pair. He did better a few weeks later in two matches against the tourists: 10 and 32 for a South African Colts XI and 17 and 92 for Transvaal. However, after that he played only two more first-class matches, in 1965–66.
