= George Parry (cricketer) =

English cricketer

George Frederick Parry (8 December 1794 – 11 January 1872) was an English amateur cricketer who played from 1818 to 1829.

Parry was born at Tellicherry (now Thalassery), Kerala, India. Mainly associated with Marylebone Cricket Club (MCC) and Surrey, he made 16 known appearances in important matches. He played for the Gentlemen in the Gentlemen v Players series. He died in Mentone, Italy, aged 77.
