= John Warner (umpire) =

South African cricket umpire (1911–1995)

Personal information
- Full name: John Edwin Warner
- Born: 3 May 1911; Plumstead, Cape Town, South Africa
- Died: 31 October 1995 (aged 84); Cape Town, South Africa

Umpiring information
- Tests umpired: 2 (1962–1965)
- Source: Cricinfo, 17 July 2013

John Edwin Warner (3 May 1911 – 31 October 1995) was a South African cricket umpire. Making his Test umpiring debut in 1962, he stood in two Test matches, the second Test being in 1965.

== See also ==
- List of Test cricket umpires
