= Jack Alabaster =

New Zealand cricketer (1930–2024)

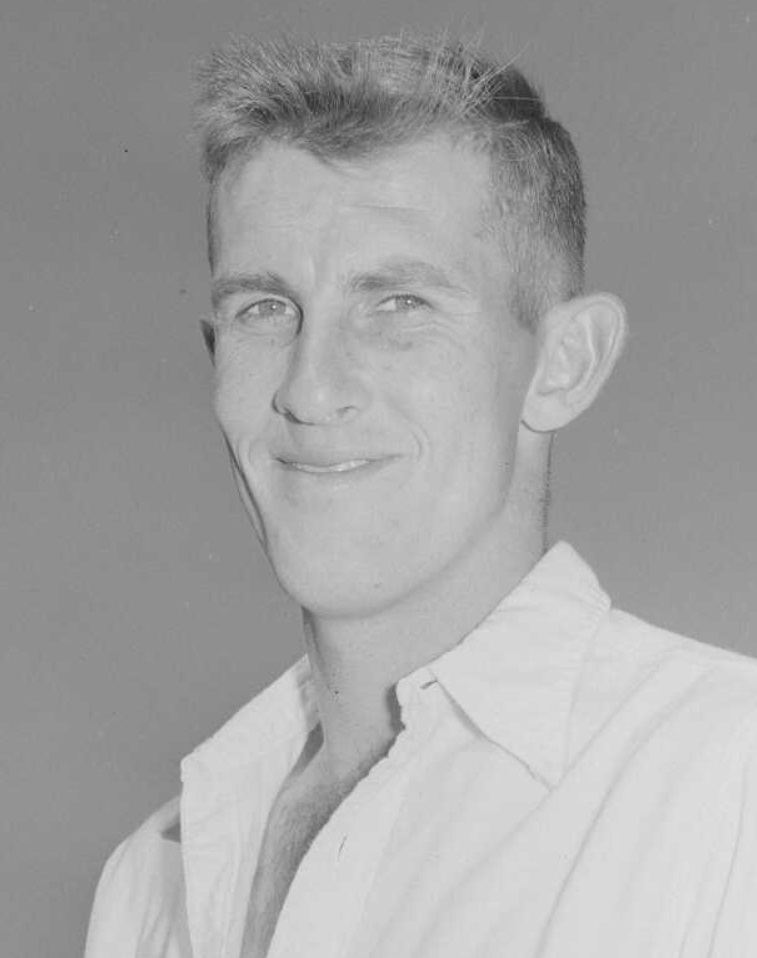
- Alabaster in 1956

Personal information
- Full name: John Chaloner Alabaster
- Born: 11 July 1930; Invercargill, New Zealand
- Died: 9 April 2024 (aged 93); Cromwell, New Zealand
- Batting: Right-handed
- Bowling: Legbreak
- Relatives: Gren Alabaster (brother)

International information
- National side: New Zealand (1955–1972)
- Test debut (cap 71): 13 October 1955 v Pakistan
- Last Test: 9 March 1972 v West Indies

Domestic team information
- Years: Team
- 1954/55–1974/75: Southland
- 1955/56–1971/72: Otago

Career statistics
Competition	Test	First-class
Matches	21	143
Runs scored	272	2,427
Batting average	9.71	13.33
100s/50s	0/0	0/5
Top score	34	82
Balls bowled	3,992	30,144
Wickets	49	500
Bowling average	38.02	25.37
5 wickets in innings	0	25
10 wickets in match	0	4
Best bowling	4/46	7/41
Catches/stumpings	7/–	94/–
- Source: Cricinfo, 19 May 2024

John Chaloner Alabaster (11 July 1930 – 9 April 2024) was a New Zealand cricketer who played 21 Test matches for the country's national team between 1955 and 1972. A leg-spin bowler, he was the only New Zealander to play in each of the country's first four Test victories. In domestic cricket, he was often partnered at the crease for his provincial side Otago by his younger brother Gren, who bowled off-spin. A schoolteacher, he later served as Rector of Southland Boys' High School in Invercargill.

== Cricket career ==
=== 1950s ===
Alabaster was born in Invercargill, one of three sons and a daughter of Harold and Mary Alabaster. He and his brothers attended Southland Boys' High School, a block away from their home. He represented New Zealand in basketball in the early 1950s. He was successful for the Southland cricket team but received no encouragement from Otago and was unable to break into the Otago team. Walter Hadlee noticed his potential, however, and it was while Hadlee was on the national selection panel that, aged 25, Alabaster was selected to play for New Zealand, despite having played no first-class cricket.

Alabaster was selected for the New Zealand side to tour Pakistan and India in 1955–56. He played in five of the eight Test matches but took only two wickets. He did, however, take 2 for 30 and 5 for 99 when the New Zealanders defeated the Indian domestic side South Zone by an innings in Bangalore. Along with most of the team, he suffered from illness. He said, "I played some of the matches merely because I could stand up on the morning of the game." On the tour he lost two and a half stone (about 16 kilograms).

Later that season, back in New Zealand, Alabaster was a member of the team that won New Zealand's first Test victory, against West Indies at Eden Park, Auckland. He took two wickets as the West Indies were dismissed in the second innings for their lowest Test score of 77.

Alabaster had successful domestic seasons in 1956–57 and 1957–58, in which season he took 36 wickets for 18.00, including 4 for 35 and 6 for 40 to help Otago beat Auckland at Dunedin. Otago also won the Plunket Shield, and Alabaster was selected to tour England in 1958. He showed good form in the early matches, taking 6 for 37 and 5 for 43 in an innings victory over Leicestershire. He took 4 for 46 in the first innings of the First Test at Edgbaston against England, but lost his spot after the Second Test. In assessing his tour, Wisden noted that he "spun the ball little" but deceived the batsmen with "his accuracy and variations of flight".

After the 1958 tour, Alabaster realised he needed to learn how to bowl the googly to become a more effective bowler. Now established in the Otago team, he formed an effective partnership with the older leg-spinner Alex Moir: between 1957 and 1961 they played 20 matches together for Otago and took 212 wickets.

=== 1960s ===
Alabaster had good seasons in 1959–60 and 1960–61, and took six wickets when New Zealand beat the touring MCC team in Wellington in February 1961. He returned to the Test team for the tour to South Africa in 1961–62. He took his best Test match figures of 8 for 180 (off 75 overs) in New Zealand's victory in the Third Test at Cape Town, its first-ever Test victory outside New Zealand, and took career-best first-class innings figures of 7 for 41 against a South African Colts XI at East London. He also took four wickets in New Zealand's victory in the Fifth Test; along with John Reid and Noel McGregor he played in all of New Zealand's first three Test victories. He took 86 wickets in 16 first-class matches on the tour, including 22 at an average of 28.04 in the Tests. Writing in Wisden, Geoffrey Chettle wrote, "In Alabaster we were privileged to meet the finest leg-spinner – a real finger-worker – seen in this country for many years."

Alabaster took five wickets in two Tests against England in 1962–63, but played less regularly in subsequent seasons. He next played a full season in 1967–68 and struck good form, including 5 for 43 and 5 for 79 for Otago against Northern Districts at Dunedin. He was selected in all four Tests against the touring Indian team, taking 12 wickets at 31.83. In the First Test in Dunedin he took 3 for 66 and 3 for 48, as well as making his highest Test score of 34, batting at number 10. When New Zealand won the Second Test at Christchurch he became the only New Zealander to have been in the team for each of the country's first four Test victories.

=== 1970s ===
Alabaster played no first-class cricket in 1968–69 or 1970–71, but in 1971–72 he took 22 wickets at 14.95 to help Otago to another Plunket Shield title. At the age of 41 he was selected to tour the West Indies in early 1972. He took 5 for 130 off 37 overs in the first match against Jamaica in Kingston and played in the first two Tests, but took only one wicket, when he bowled Gary Sobers in the Second Test. He missed much of the tour with injuries to his back and to an Achilles tendon, and retired from first-class cricket after the tour. He had the unusual distinction of playing his first and last first-class matches for New Zealand.

Alabaster played Hawke Cup cricket for Southland from 1954 to 1975. When Southland successfully defended the title against four challenges in 1973–74 he took 36 wickets at an average of 8.02.

== Teaching career ==
Alabaster studied teaching in Dunedin. He briefly taught at a primary school before returning to teach science and mathematics at his old school, Southland Boys' High School, where he stayed from 1955 to 1975. He became principal of Kingswell High School in Invercargill in 1975, and in 1981 he was appointed Rector of Southland Boys' High School, where he stayed until he retired in 1988.

== Personal life and death ==
Alabaster and his wife Shirley (née Kemp) married on 10 January 1953. They lived in Alexandra. Shirley Alabaster received the Queen's Service Medal in 2009 for her work in support of the Dunstan Hospital in Clyde. Jack Alabaster died on 9 April 2024, at the age of 93, and Shirley Alabaster died in 2026.
