= Paul Barton =

New Zealand cricketer

Personal information
- Full name: Paul Thomas Barton
- Born: 9 October 1935 (age 91); Wellington, New Zealand
- Batting: Right-handed
- Bowling: Left-arm slow-medium
- Relatives: Eddie Barton (father)

International information
- National side: New Zealand (1961–1963)
- Test debut (cap 89): 8 December 1961 v South Africa
- Last Test: 15 March 1963 v England

Domestic team information
- Years: Team
- 1954–55 to 1967–68: Wellington

Career statistics
Competition	Test	FC
Matches	7	71
Runs scored	285	2,820
Batting average	20.35	23.89
100s/50s	1/1	3/8
Top score	109	118
Balls bowled	0	594
Wickets	–	7
Bowling average	–	26.71
5 wickets in innings	–	0
10 wickets in match	–	0
Best bowling	–	3/33
Catches/stumpings	4/–	54/–
- Source: Cricinfo, 1 April 2017

Paul Thomas Barton (born 9 October 1935) is a former New Zealand cricketer who played in seven Tests from 1961 to 1963. He played first-class cricket for Wellington from 1954–55 to 1967–68.

== Early and family life ==
Barton was born in Wellington, and grew up in Lower Hutt. He attended St Patrick's College, Wellington.

Barton's father Eddie played football for New Zealand in the 1930s. Paul's sister, Carole Fredrick, was a prominent bowler, winning two national titles.

== Cricket career ==
A batsman who usually came in at number three or four, Barton played his provincial cricket for Wellington from 1954–55 to 1967–68. His highest score was 118 in Wellington's victory over Auckland in the 1960–61 Plunket Shield. A few days before this innings he had top-scored for Wellington against the touring MCC, and shortly afterwards he was selected to play for New Zealand in the first of three unofficial Tests against the MCC. He scored 42 and 31, and was retained in the team for the rest of the series.

Barton made his Test debut on tour against South Africa in 1961–62 in Durban with a fine half-century. His other Test innings of note came in the final game of the same series, when he made 109 in Port Elizabeth, a "composed, correct and polished" innings of four and a half hours that was the only century in a match that New Zealand won by 40 runs to square the series. This promising first series, 240 runs at 30.00, cemented his place in the Test team against England in 1962–63 but he made only 45 runs in the three Tests and was not selected again.

After his first-class cricket career ended, Barton moved to Perth, Western Australia. He won the batting award in the Western Australian Cricket Association competition in 1970–71, when he scored 488 runs at an average of 81.33 for South Perth.
