= Keith Punch =

Australian cricketer (born 1940)

Personal information
- Born: 19 October 1940 (age 86); Perth, Western Australia
- Batting: Right-handed
- Bowling: Left arm medium
- Source: Cricinfo, 3 November 2017

Keith Punch (born 19 October 1940) is an Australian cricketer. He played fifteen first-class matches for Western Australia between 1960/61 and 1963/64.
