= John Guy (New Zealand cricketer) =

New Zealand cricketer

Personal information
- Full name: John William Guy
- Born: 29 August 1934 (age 92); Nelson, New Zealand
- Batting: Left-handed
- Bowling: Right-arm slow-medium

International information
- National side: New Zealand (1955–1961)
- Test debut (cap 76): 7 November 1955 v Pakistan
- Last Test: 26 December 1961 v South Africa

Domestic team information
- Years: Team
- 1953/54–1962/63: Central Districts
- 1957/58–1958/59: Canterbury
- 1958: Northamptonshire
- 1959/60: Otago
- 1960/61: Wellington
- 1964/65–1972/73: Northern Districts

Career statistics
Competition	Test	First-class
Matches	12	90
Runs scored	440	3,923
Batting average	20.95	25.80
100s/50s	1/3	3/24
Top score	102	115
Balls bowled	0	90
Wickets	–	1
Bowling average	–	82.00
5 wickets in innings	–	0
10 wickets in match	–	0
Best bowling	–	1/0
Catches/stumpings	2/–	32/–
- Source: Cricinfo, 1 April 2017

John William Guy (born 29 August 1934) is a former New Zealand cricketer who played 12 Tests for the national team between 1955 and 1961. He currently resides in Melbourne, Australia.

== Life and career ==
Guy was born in Nelson on 29 August 1934, and was educated at Nelson College between 1950 and 1953.

Guy made his first-class cricket debut in 1953–54 for Central Districts. Moving around New Zealand in the course of his working career, he later represented Canterbury, Otago and Wellington, and finished his first-class career with Northern Districts in 1972–73. He is the only player to represent five New Zealand provincial teams in first-class cricket. He also played twice for Northamptonshire in the 1958 English cricket season.

Guy played his first Tests on the tour of Pakistan in 1955–56. In the series against India that followed immediately afterwards, he had his most successful series, scoring 313 runs at an average of 34.77, including a century (102) in the First Test, 52 in the Third Test, and 91 in the Fourth Test. He played a few more Tests with little success, finishing with two Tests on the tour of South Africa in 1961–62.

In the early 1960s Guy worked for Shell. Following the end of his cricket career, he became a national selector and was a representative for Newbury cricket bats. Guy developed the shoulderless Excalibur bat used by fellow New Zealand cricketer Lance Cairns.
