= Tiger Lance =

South African cricketer (1940–2010)

- Tiger Lance after the Fifth Test in 1966–67

Personal information
- Full name: Herbert Roy Lance
- Born: 6 June 1940; Pretoria, Transvaal, South Africa
- Died: 10 November 2010 (aged 70); Johannesburg, Gauteng, South Africa
- Nickname: Tiger
- Height: 185 cm (6 ft 1 in)
- Batting: Right-handed
- Bowling: Right-arm medium
- Role: All-rounder

International information
- National side: South Africa
- Test debut: 2 February 1962 v New Zealand
- Last Test: 5 March 1970 v Australia

Career statistics
Competition	Test	First-class
Matches	13	103
Runs scored	591	5,336
Batting average	28.14	34.87
100s/50s	0/5	11/25
Top score	70	169
Balls bowled	948	4,284
Wickets	12	167
Bowling average	39.91	25.65
5 wickets in innings	0	2
10 wickets in match	0	0
Best bowling	3/30	6/55
Catches/stumpings	7/–	101/–
- Source: Cricinfo, 3 December 2020

Herbert Roy "Tiger" Lance (6 June 1940 – 10 November 2010) was a South African cricketer who played in 13 Test matches between 1962 and 1970 as an all-rounder.

Tiger Lance was born in Pretoria, Transvaal. He was a forceful middle-order batsman and useful seam bowler. His father William and his younger brother Anthony also played first-class cricket in South Africa.

His most successful series was against Australia in 1966–67, when he played several important innings after early wickets had fallen cheaply; he hit a six off the bowling of Ian Chappell to win not only the Fifth Test in Port Elizabeth, but also the series, South Africa's first series win against Australia in the eleventh series between the two countries. In the five Tests of the series he scored 261 runs at 37.28.

His form in domestic matches in 1969–70 was moderate and he was not selected for the First Test against Australia, but at the request of the captain Ali Bacher he was included in the side for the rest of the series. He was also selected for the 1970 tour of England and the 1971–72 tour of Australia, but neither series eventuated owing to anti-apartheid feeling in the host countries.

He retired after the 1971–72 season.

He died in hospital in Johannesburg, four weeks after the car he was driving was hit by a woman driving on the wrong side of the road.
