= Kim Elgie =

South African cricketer (1933–2025)

Personal information
- Full name: Michael Kelsey Elgie
- Born: 6 March 1933; Berea, Durban, Natal, South Africa
- Died: 16 September 2025 (aged 92); Hillcrest, KwaZulu-Natal, South Africa
- Batting: Right-handed
- Bowling: Slow left-arm orthodox

International information
- National side: South Africa
- Test debut: 8 December 1961 v New Zealand
- Last Test: 1 January 1962 v New Zealand

Domestic team information
- Years: Team
- 1957/58–1961/62: Natal

Career statistics
Competition	Test	First-class
Matches	3	32
Runs scored	75	1,834
Batting average	12.50	36.67
100s/50s	0/1	3/13
Top score	56	162*
Balls bowled	66	760
Wickets	0	10
Bowling average	–	40.50
5 wickets in innings	–	0
10 wickets in match	–	0
Best bowling	–	3/16
Catches/stumpings	4/–	25/–
- Source: Cricinfo, 3 December 2020

Michael Kelsey "Kim" Elgie (6 March 1933 – 16 September 2025) was a South African cricketer who played in three Test matches in the 1961–62 series against New Zealand. He was also a rugby union footballer, who played for Scotland eight times as a centre while he was studying at the University of St Andrews in the 1950s.

Elgie was educated at Michaelhouse before attending the University of St Andrews in Scotland, where he studied science. He then studied optometry in London. A middle-order right-handed batsman and occasional left-arm spin bowler, he played first-class cricket for Natal from 1957–58 to 1961–62, and toured England with the Fezelas in 1961. He hit his top first-class score of 162 not out for Natal against Border in the 1959–60 season in a match in which 38 wickets fell for 418 runs.

Elgie retired from cricket after the 1961–62 season to work in his family's optometry business. With the death of Godfrey Lawrence in March 2025, Elgie became the oldest living South African Test cricketer. Elgie died on 16 September 2025.

== See also ==
- List of Scottish cricket and rugby union players
