= Douglas Gibbon =

South African cricket umpire (1913–1962)

Personal information
- Full name: Douglas Braidwood Gibbon
- Born: 8 January 1913
- Died: 20 September 1962 (aged 49)

Umpiring information
- Tests umpired: 1 (1962)
- Source: Cricinfo, 7 June 2019

Douglas Braidwood Gibbon (8 January 1913 – 20 September 1962) was a South African cricket umpire. He stood in one Test match, South Africa vs. New Zealand, at Port Elizabeth 16–20 February 1962.

== See also ==
- List of Test cricket umpires
