= John Cole (South African cricketer) =

South African cricketer (1933–2014)

Personal information
- Full name: John McGregor Cole
- Born: 3 March 1933; Johannesburg, South Africa
- Died: 25 May 2014 (aged 81); Cape Town, South Africa
- Batting: Right-handed
- Bowling: Right-arm medium pace
- Role: Bowler

Domestic team information
- Years: Team
- 1959/60–1964/65: Natal
- 1965/66–1966/67: Western Province

Career statistics
Competition	First-class
Matches	35
Runs scored	176
Batting average	6.51
100s/50s	0/0
Top score	29
Balls bowled	7,660
Wickets	147
Bowling average	17.80
5 wickets in innings	8
10 wickets in match	1
Best bowling	6/16
Catches/stumpings	10/–
- Source: Cricinfo, 24 May 2024

John McGregor Cole (3 March 1933 – 25 May 2014) was a South African cricketer who played first-class cricket for Natal and Western Province between 1959 and 1967.

An accurate right-arm medium-pace bowler, Cole was part of a formidable, strong pace trio with Neil Adcock and Clive Halse when Natal won the Currie Cup in the 1960–61 season. He took 35 wickets at an average of 12.37 that season and was recognized as one of the South African Cricket Annual Cricketers of the Year in 1961. In the defeat of North Eastern Transvaal, he achieved impressive figures of 4 for 14 and 6 for 34.

Three seasons later, Cole recorded his best innings bowling figures, taking 6 for 16 in Natal's victory over Western Province. Additionally, during a match where Natal dismissed Border for the world-record low scores of 16 and 18 in 1959–60, Cole posted match figures of 20 overs, 12 runs, 17 balls, and 7 wickets.
