= One-Test wonder =

Cricketing terminology

In cricket, a one-Test wonder is usually a cricketer who is only selected for one Test match during his career and never represents his country again. This is not necessarily due to a poor performance and can be for numerous reasons, such as injury or strong competition from other players. The term is also used in rugby.

More rarely, the term may refer to a player who has played in more than one Test, but was very successful only once. Examples include the bowlers Narendra Hirwani of India and Bob Massie of Australia, both of whom took eight wickets in each innings of their debut matches, but then failed to live up to their early promise. Spin bowler Ashton Agar of Australia played just 5 tests, taking 9 wickets, but his most notable contribution was in his first test and with the bat as he scored 98 on debut as the final Australian batsman, breaking multiple records including being the first Test player to score a half-century as a number eleven batsman on debut and the highest score by any number eleven batsman.

== Notable examples ==
As of December 2025, there have been 484 players who have only played one Test match. Some of the best performances by these players are:

- Andy Ganteaume, who scored 112 for the West Indies in his only Test innings in 1948.
- Rodney Redmond is the only other player to have scored a century in his only Test, scoring 107 and 56 while opening the batting for New Zealand in 1973.
- West Indian Vic Stollmeyer, brother of Jeff Stollmeyer, scored 96 in his only Test in 1939.
- Mick Malone took five wickets in an innings and scored 46 in his only Test for Australia in 1977, leaving him with a bowling average of 12.83 and a batting average of 46, before joining World Series Cricket.
- Stuart Law scored 54 not out in his only Test innings for Australia in 1995, leaving him without a Test average as Australia won the game by an innings and 36 runs and weren't required to bat again. Ricky Ponting also made his debut in this match, scoring 96 runs, but unlike Law and his one Test match, Ponting went on to play 168 Tests for Australia with 77 of those as the captain.
- Gobo Ashley took 7 for 95 for South Africa in the only opposition innings of his single Test in 1889.
- Charles Marriott recorded match figures of 11 for 96 (5 for 37 and 6 for 59) in his only Test for England in 1933. No other bowler has taken more than ten wickets in his only Test.
- Among wicket-keepers, Indian player Rajindernath made four stumpings in his only Test in 1952, but was not called on to bat.

Other notable occurrences of players' only Test are:

- Ed Joyce played in Ireland's first Test match in May 2018, and announced his retirement from all cricket one week later.
- Andy Lloyd scored 10 runs (not out) for England in his only Test against the West Indies, in June 1984, before being struck on the head by a short-pitched delivery from Malcolm Marshall. Although he subsequently recovered from the injury, he never played for his national team again and is the only Test Match opening batsman never to have been dismissed in Test cricket.
- Darren Pattinson is an unusual one-Test wonder in that he played a single Test for England, while his brother James Pattinson had a more successful Test career with Australia.
- Khalid Hasan played for Pakistan in 1954, and at the age of 16 years 352 days, he is the youngest cricketer to play in just one Test.

Instances of one-Test wonders are reasonably common: about 12.5% of Test cricketers are picked only once for their country. Occasionally, one-Test wonders have been recalled to Test cricket after a gap of several years. One example was Ryan Sidebottom, who was recalled for his second Test in 2007 after his debut in 2001. Coincidentally his father, Arnie Sidebottom, was a one-Test wonder.

As of May 2007, fourteen one-Test wonders have also played in a single One Day International for their team.
