= Noel McGregor =

New Zealand cricketer

Personal information
- Full name: Spencer Noel McGregor
- Born: 18 December 1931; Dunedin, New Zealand
- Died: 21 November 2007 (aged 75); Christchurch, New Zealand
- Batting: Right-handed

International information
- National side: New Zealand (1955–1965)
- Test debut (cap 69): 11 March 1955 v England
- Last Test: 29 January 1965 v Pakistan

Career statistics
Competition	Test	First-class
Matches	25	148
Runs scored	892	6,573
Batting average	19.82	25.47
100s/50s	1/3	5/38
Top score	111	114*
Balls bowled	0	321
Wickets	–	3
Bowling average	–	47.33
5 wickets in innings	–	0
10 wickets in match	–	0
Best bowling	–	1/5
Catches/stumpings	9/–	78/–
- Source: Cricinfo, 1 April 2017

Spencer Noel McGregor (18 December 1931 – 21 November 2007) was a Test cricketer who played 25 Test matches for New Zealand between 1954–55 and 1964–65. He was the New Zealand Cricket Almanack Player of the Year in 1968.

== Domestic career ==
Noel McGregor was born in Dunedin and played for Otago. A batsman who liked to play his strokes, at 17 he hit the first ball he faced in the Plunket Shield for four, and hit two more boundaries in the same over from Tom Burtt.

In 90 first-class matches for Otago between 1947–48 and 1968–69 he scored 4259 runs at an average of 27.65. In all first-class matches he made five centuries, the highest a fine unbeaten 114 to take Otago to a seven-wicket victory over Wellington in 1959–60. He was also an occasional wicketkeeper.

He continued in club cricket after his long first-class career, playing up to the age of 58, and was also a leading bowls administrator.

== International career ==
The highlight of his long Test career was his only century, 111 scored in five and a half hours at number four against Pakistan in a losing cause in Lahore in 1955. It was also his first first-class century.

In his second Test he had been part of the team that was bowled out by England in 1954–55 for just 26, the record lowest Test score; the next season he took a crucial catch against the West Indies when New Zealand won a Test for the first time.

He made three fifties in the series against South Africa on New Zealand's 1961–62 tour there, scoring 709 runs in all first-class matches. In the Third Test at Cape Town he opened the batting and made 68 and 20 in New Zealand's first Test victory outside New Zealand. In the Fifth Test at Port Elizabeth his contribution was more modest (10 and 24 at number five) but New Zealand won again. He (along with John Reid and Jack Alabaster) played in all of New Zealand's first three Test victories.

He played all three Tests against South Africa in New Zealand in 1963–64, his 168 runs at 28.00 placing him second in the New Zealand aggregates and averages behind Barry Sinclair. His last two Tests were against Pakistan in New Zealand in 1964–65.

Bert Sutcliffe described McGregor's batting style as "as light on his feet as a dancer, and absolutely full of shots". Dick Brittenden wrote of him in 1961, "He fairly bristles with aggression, he has a glittering array of strokes, and he is capable of demoralising the most phlegmatic and painstaking bowler [but] he has too often squandered his talents." After the tour of South Africa in 1961–62, the tour manager, Gordon Leggat, said McGregor was "one of our best-equipped batsmen if only he would curb an impetuosity to make his century not merely before lunch but, as it sometimes seemed, before breakfast".
