= Gary Bartlett =

New Zealand cricketer

Personal information
- Full name: Gary Alex Bartlett
- Born: 3 February 1941 (age 85); Blenheim, Marlborough
- Batting: Right-handed
- Bowling: Right-arm fast

International information
- National side: New Zealand (1961–1968)
- Test debut (cap 88): 8 December 1961 v South Africa
- Last Test: 7 March 1968 v India

Career statistics
Competition	Test	First-class
Matches	10	61
Runs scored	263	1,504
Batting average	15.47	16.71
100s/50s	0/0	0/4
Top score	40	99*
Balls bowled	1,768	10,151
Wickets	24	150
Bowling average	33.00	28.32
5 wickets in innings	1	3
10 wickets in match	0	0
Best bowling	6/38	6/38
Catches/stumpings	8/–	39/–
- Source: Cricinfo, 1 April 2017

Gary Alex Bartlett (born 3 February 1941) is a former New Zealand cricketer. He played 10 Test matches for New Zealand in the 1960s as a fast bowler.

== Domestic career ==
Bartlett was born in Blenheim, and grew up across the road from the town's main cricket ground, Horton Park. He made his first-class debut for Central Districts in the 1958–59 season aged only 17, and played all four matches for New Zealand in the non-Test series against an Australian XI in the following season. Wisden described him as "the real discovery of the season". The Australian captain, Ian Craig, described facing him in the first match of the series in Wellington: "I saw Bartlett let go of the ball, but the first I knew of where it had gone was the sound of it hitting the gloves yards behind me. I think it was the quickest bowling I faced."

Bartlett moved to Canterbury for the 1963–64 season where he was a member of the West Christchurch University club team. He was one of the leading players in the Plunket Shield in 1965–66, scoring 228 runs at an average of 32.57 and taking 20 wickets at 19.65. He returned to Central Districts in 1966–67, and played his last first-class matches in the 1969–70 season.

Bartlett also had a successful career for Marlborough in the Hawke Cup between 1958 and 1970. In his first match, against Waikato in 1957–58, aged 16, he took 6 for 37 and 2 for 11 and hit the match top score of 52 not out. In 1967–68 he captained Marlborough when they won the title for the first time, scoring 80 in the first innings (the highest score on either side in the match) and taking four wickets in each innings in the victory over Hutt Valley.

== International career ==
Bartlett toured South Africa in 1961–62, making his Test debut and playing all five Tests. He took only eight wickets but made useful runs (215 at 23.88) batting at eight or nine. He made only occasional Test appearances thereafter, all in New Zealand. Dissatisfied with his fitness, he made himself unavailable for New Zealand's tour of India, Pakistan and England in 1965, although the selectors wanted him to tour. His outstanding Test moment came in the Second Test against India in Christchurch in 1967–68, when he took 6 for 38 – at the time the best figures in Tests by a New Zealand bowler – in the second innings to help New Zealand to its first victory over India.

The New Zealand cricket historian Don Neely described Bartlett as "New Zealand's first bowler of devastating pace". Unfortunately his successes, and much of his career, were overshadowed by doubts about the legitimacy of his bowling action. During the Christchurch Test in 1968 the Indian bowler Syed Abid Ali protested against Bartlett's action by blatantly throwing the ball himself. Bartlett missed the next Test, but when he was selected for the Fourth Test, the Indian manager, Ghulam Ahmed, protested. According to the Indian captain, the Nawab of Pataudi, "All the Indian players, including myself, considered Bartlett's action to be suspect." Despite the doubts and accusations, Bartlett was never no-balled for throwing.

== Later life ==
Bartlett worked as a professional hunter, shooting feral animals, mostly rabbits. He was also a cricket coach.

A housing development in Blenheim was named "Bartlett's Green" in his honour in 2023.
