= Peter Heine =

South African cricketer (1928–2005)

Personal information
- Full name: Peter Samuel Heine
- Born: 28 June 1928; Winterton, Natal, South Africa
- Died: 4 February 2005 (aged 76); Pretoria, South Africa
- Height: 6 ft 4 in (1.93 m)
- Batting: Right-handed
- Bowling: Right-arm fast

International information
- National side: South Africa
- Test debut: 23 June 1955 v England
- Last Test: 2 February 1962 v New Zealand

Career statistics
Competition	Test	First-class
Matches	14	61
Runs scored	209	1,255
Batting average	9.95	15.12
100s/50s	0/0	0/4
Top score	31	67
Balls bowled	3,890	14,310
Wickets	58	277
Bowling average	25.08	21.38
5 wickets in innings	4	20
10 wickets in match	0	4
Best bowling	6/58	8/92
Catches/stumpings	8/–	34/–
- Source: CricketArchive, 1 February 2020

Peter Samuel Heine (28 June 1928 – 4 February 2005) was a South African cricketer who played in fourteen Test matches between 1955 and 1962. On his Test debut, he took five wickets in the first innings against England at Lord's in 1955.

== Life and career ==
A fast bowler renowned for his consummate hostility, he formed a potent Test combination with Neil Adcock. Heine picked up 277 first-class wickets at an average of 21.38, including a haul of 8 for 92 for Orange Free State against Transvaal in Welkom in 1954–55. He played for North-Eastern Transvaal in 1951–52 and 1952–53, Orange Free State in 1953–54 and 1954–55, and Transvaal from 1955–56 to 1964–65.

While batting in the match between Orange Free State and Natal at the Ramblers Cricket Club Ground in Bloemfontein in January 1955, Heine straight-drove a ball from Hugh Tayfield out of the ground. It was estimated at the time to have travelled 180 yards before landing, but it was not measured.

Heine died on 4 February 2005 due to cardiac arrest in a private hospital in Pretoria. He was the brother of tennis player Bobbie Heine Miller.

== See also ==
- List of South Africa cricketers who have taken five-wicket hauls on Test debut

== Notes ==
- Subramanyam, P. "Peter Heine dead." The Hindu, 6 February 2005.
