= Harry Bromfield =

South African cricketer (1932–2020)

Personal information
- Full name: Harry Dudley Bromfield
- Born: 26 June 1932; Mossel Bay, Cape Province
- Died: 27 December 2020 (aged 88)
- Batting: Right-handed
- Bowling: Right-arm off-break

International information
- National side: South Africa
- Test debut: 8 December 1961 v New Zealand
- Last Test: 22 July 1965 v England

Career statistics
Competition	Test	First-class
Matches	9	62
Runs scored	59	374
Batting average	11.80	6.33
100s/50s	0/0	0/0
Top score	21	44
Balls bowled	1,810	14,763
Wickets	17	205
Bowling average	35.23	25.63
5 wickets in innings	1	13
10 wickets in match	0	1
Best bowling	5/88	7/60
Catches/stumpings	13/–	68/–
- Source: Cricinfo, 3 December 2020

Harry Dudley Bromfield (26 June 1932 – 27 December 2020) was a South African cricketer who played in nine Test matches between 1961 and 1965.

A tail-end batsman and a right-arm off-break bowler, Bromfield succeeded Hugh Tayfield in the South African team but had limited success in Test matches. His best figures were 5 for 88 (off 57.2 overs) against England at Cape Town in 1964–65. He toured England in 1965, playing his last Test in the First Test at Lord's.

He played for Western Province from 1956–57 to 1965–66, then returned for one last match in 1968–69. His best figures were 7 for 60 against Transvaal in 1960–61. In 1962–63, also against Transvaal, he took 5 for 100 and 5 for 64, for match figures of 76.4–25–164–10. In his most successful season, 1960–61, he took 35 wickets at an average of 17.45.
