= John Sparling =

New Zealand cricketer (born 1938)

John Sparling MNZM
- Sparling in 2026

Personal information
- Full name: John Trevor Sparling
- Born: 24 July 1938 (age 88); Mount Eden, Auckland, New Zealand
- Batting: Right-handed
- Bowling: Right-arm off-spin

International information
- National side: New Zealand (1958–1964)
- Test debut (cap 84): 3 July 1958 v England
- Last Test: 28 February 1964 v South Africa

Domestic team information
- Years: Team
- 1956/57–1970/71: Auckland

Career statistics
Competition	Test	First-class
Matches	11	127
Runs scored	229	4,606
Batting average	12.72	24.37
100s/50s	0/1	2/27
Top score	50	105
Balls bowled	708	18,824
Wickets	5	318
Bowling average	65.40	22.71
5 wickets in innings	0	17
10 wickets in match	0	3
Best bowling	1/9	7/49
Catches/stumpings	3/–	86/–
- Source: Cricinfo, 1 April 2017

John Trevor Sparling MNZM (born 24 July 1938) is a former New Zealand cricketer who played in 11 Test matches between 1958 and 1964. He worked as a lawyer, and became a cricket administrator after his playing career ended.

== Domestic career ==
Sparling was educated at Auckland Grammar School. A fair-haired, off-spinning all-rounder, he was coached in Auckland by Jim Laker, and broke into the Auckland team at the age of 18. He continued to play for Auckland until 1970–71. He captained Auckland through most of the 1960s, leading the team to two Plunket Shield titles.

Sparling's most successful season with the bat was 1959–60, when he made 705 runs at an average of 37.10. In the Plunket Shield match against Canterbury that season he scored 105 and 51 and took 7 for 98 and 2 for 13.

His most successful season with the ball was 1964–65, when he took 38 wickets at an average of 15.50. His career-best figures that year, 7 for 49 for Auckland against Otago, took Auckland to a narrow victory.

== International career ==
Sparling was the youngest member of the New Zealand cricket team that toured England in 1958. On a tour where New Zealand were badly outclassed and in a summer where the weather was almost uniformly dismal, Sparling was one of the few players to emerge with an enhanced reputation. Wisden called him the player with "undoubtedly most promise" and wrote: "A natural cricketer, he should come to the fore with so many years ahead of him."

In fact, Sparling's figures for the tour were fairly modest: 513 runs at an average of less than 18 runs per innings and 38 wickets at just over 20 runs a wicket. He played in the last three of the five Tests and his 50 at Old Trafford on his 20th birthday was one of only three 50s scored by the Test team all summer. His stand of 61 for the seventh wicket with Eric Petrie in this match was the highest stand for New Zealand in the whole series.

Predictions of an illustrious Test career were, however, wide of the mark. Sparling played twice against the touring English team in 1958–59, three times on the New Zealand tour of South Africa in 1961–62, once against England in New Zealand in 1962–63 and twice in the home series against South Africa in 1963–64. In none of these matches did Sparling reach 50 as a batsman or take more than one wicket in an innings. He played in all four of the matches New Zealand played against the visiting Australian team in 1959–60, scoring two fifties and taking six wickets, but they were not Test matches.

Sparling was unavailable for the tour of India, Pakistan and England in 1965, and the selectors turned to the younger spin-bowling all-rounders Bryan Yuile, Vic Pollard and Ross Morgan. His work as a solicitor also kept him out of the series in New Zealand against England in 1965–66, when he might otherwise have succeeded John Reid as New Zealand's captain.

At Auckland in the New Zealand v England Test match in February 1963, Sparling bowled an 11-ball over when the umpire, Dick Shortt, lost count of the number of balls Sparling had bowled.

== Later life ==
Sparling worked as a lawyer in Auckland. In 1978 he joined the firm Rennie Cox & Garlick, which then became Rennie Cox, Garlick & Sparling.

He has been closely involved in cricket administration since his playing career ended. In recognition of his services he was made Auckland Cricket Patron and a life member of the New Zealand Cricket Players' Association. A biography, All So Enjoyable: John Sparling's Life in Cricket, by Trevor Auger, was published in 2023.

In the 2026 King's Birthday Honours, Sparling was appointed a Member of the New Zealand Order of Merit, for services to cricket.
