= Murray Chapple =

New Zealand cricketer (1930–1985)

- Murray Chapple in 1961

Personal information
- Full name: Murray Ernest Chapple
- Born: 25 July 1930; Christchurch, New Zealand
- Died: 31 July 1985 (aged 55); Hamilton, New Zealand
- Batting: Right-handed
- Bowling: Left-arm medium Slow left-arm orthodox

International information
- National side: New Zealand (1953–1966)
- Test debut (cap 61): 13 March 1953 v South Africa
- Last Test: 25 February 1966 v England

Career statistics
| Competition | Test | First-class |
|---|---|---|
| Matches | 14 | 119 |
| Runs scored | 497 | 5,344 |
| Batting average | 19.11 | 28.88 |
| 100s/50s | 0/3 | 4/31 |
| Top score | 76 | 165 |
| Balls bowled | 248 | 11,064 |
| Wickets | 1 | 142 |
| Bowling average | 84.00 | 25.06 |
| 5 wickets in innings | 0 | 4 |
| 10 wickets in match | 0 | 0 |
| Best bowling | 1/24 | 5/24 |
| Catches/stumpings | 10/– | 67/– |
- Source: Cricinfo, 1 April 2017

Murray Ernest Chapple (25 July 1930 – 31 July 1985) was a New Zealand cricketer. He played 14 Test matches over 13 years, scoring three fifties with a highest score of 76. He captained New Zealand in one Test in 1966.

== Playing career ==
Chapple was a right-handed middle-order batsman and left-arm medium-pace bowler who bowled left-arm spin later in his career. In a first-class career that began when he was 19 and ended when he was 41, Chapple played for Canterbury (1949–50, 1952–53 to 1960–61) and Central Districts (1950–51 to 1951–52, 1962–63 to 1965–66), toured South Africa with the New Zealand teams in 1953–54 and 1961–62, and captained New Zealand in the First Test against England in 1965–66.

Chapple came to national prominence in 1952–53 when, after four Plunket Shield seasons in which his highest score was 79, he scored 165 and 88 opening the batting for Canterbury against the touring South Africans. He was selected for the Second Test against South Africa, and the tour of South Africa the following season. His best bowling figures were 5 for 24 for Canterbury against Auckland in 1955–56.

After a leg injury forced him out of the Second Test in 1965–66, he retired.

== Administrative career ==
While managing the New Zealand team that toured West Indies in 1971–72, Chapple played in the match against Windward Islands when injuries reduced the side to ten fit players, but the match was ruined by rain and he did not bat, bowl or field. His management of the tour was praised by Henry Blofeld in Wisden: "He did a lot to relieve his players of the many different pressures which were upon them and was always a wise counsellor. He must share the credit for the success of the tour."

Chapple also managed the New Zealand side that toured India and Pakistan in 1976–77. He was appointed to manage the team to England in 1986, but died before the tour began.

== Personal life ==
Chapple worked as a schoolteacher, and then as a school inspector. At the time of his death in July 1985 he was the district senior inspector of primary schools in Hamilton. He and his wife Frances had a daughter and two sons.

Sporting positions
| Preceded by John Reid | New Zealand national cricket captain 1966 | Succeeded by Barry Sinclair |
