= George Parry (umpire) =

South African cricket umpire

Umpiring information
- Tests umpired: 2 (1962)
- WTests umpired: 1 (1960)
- Source: Cricinfo, 7 June 2019

George Parry (12 December 1908 – 26 October 1979) was a South African cricket umpire. He stood in two Test matches in 1962.

== See also ==
- List of Test cricket umpires
