= Artie Dick =

New Zealand cricketer

Personal information
- Full name: Arthur Edward Dick
- Born: 10 October 1936 (age 90); Middlemarch, Otago, New Zealand
- Batting: Right-handed
- Role: Wicket-keeper

International information
- National side: New Zealand (1961–1965)
- Test debut (cap 91): 8 December 1961 v South Africa
- Last Test: 17 June 1965 v England

Domestic team information
- Years: Team
- 1956/57–1960/61: Otago
- 1962/63–1968/69: Wellington

Career statistics
Competition	Test	First-class
Matches	17	78
Runs scored	370	2,315
Batting average	14.23	20.30
100s/50s	0/1	1/10
Top score	50*	127
Catches/stumpings	47/4	148/21
- Source: Cricinfo, 1 April 2017

Arthur Edward Dick (born 10 October 1936) is a former cricketer who played 17 Test matches for New Zealand as a batsman and wicket-keeper between 1961 and 1965.

== Cricket career ==
Dick made his first-class debut for Otago on Christmas Day 1956, playing as a middle-order batsman. He continued as a batsman with moderate results until he was selected for the tour of South Africa in 1961–62. John Ward, who was also selected, was an experienced wicket-keeper who had toured England in 1958, but his batting was weak, and so Dick, who had kept wicket only once in first-class cricket, for Otago against the MCC in 1958–59, was given a chance with the gloves.

Dick kept wicket when the team stopped at Perth on the way to South Africa and played a match against Western Australia, but conceded 32 byes in the match. However, his wicket-keeping form improved when the team reached Africa and he kept wicket in all five Tests, taking 21 catches and 2 stumpings, although he conceded 52 byes in the series, against only 9 by his South African counterpart John Waite. His 50 not out in the second innings of the Third Test in Cape Town helped New Zealand to its first Test victory outside New Zealand. On the way back to New Zealand the team again played in Australia, and Dick made his only first-class century, 127 against New South Wales, after going in to bat with the New Zealanders at 32 for 5.

He moved to Wellington for the 1962–63 season, and kept his place in the Test side for most of the next few series. On the tour of England in 1965 he played in the first two Tests, then against Northamptonshire hit a "magnificent 96 in eighty-seven minutes which contained two 6's and sixteen 4's", only to be replaced by Ward for the Third Test a few days later. Dick never played another Test.

In the next four years Ward, Eric Petrie, Roy Harford and Barry Milburn all had a few Tests as New Zealand's wicket-keeper before Ken Wadsworth established himself in the position in 1969. Dick played the 1965–66 season for Wellington, then played no first-class cricket until he returned for four matches in 1968–69.

Beginning with the 1973–74 season, the Arthur Dick Cup has been awarded annually to the leading run-scorer in Wellington club cricket.
