= Godfrey Lawrence =

Rhodesian cricketer (1932–2025)

Personal information
- Full name: Godfrey Bernard Lawrence
- Born: 31 March 1932; Salisbury, Southern Rhodesia
- Died: 12 March 2025 (aged 92); Brisbane, Queensland, Australia
- Nickname: Goofy
- Batting: Right-handed
- Bowling: Right-arm fast-medium

International information
- National side: South Africa
- Test debut: 8 December 1961 v New Zealand
- Last Test: 16 February 1962 v New Zealand

Domestic team information
- Years: Team
- 1952/53–1965/66: Rhodesia
- 1966/67: Natal B

Career statistics
Competition	Test	First-class
Matches	5	77
Runs scored	141	1,079
Batting average	17.62	12.69
100s/50s	0/0	0/1
Top score	43	60*
Balls bowled	1,334	18,244
Wickets	28	342
Bowling average	18.28	17.97
5 wickets in innings	2	15
10 wickets in match	0	1
Best bowling	8/53	8/42
Catches/stumpings	2/–	54/–
- Source: Cricinfo, 3 December 2020

Godfrey Bernard "Goofy" Lawrence (31 March 1932 – 12 March 2025) was a Rhodesian cricketer who played in five Test matches for South Africa in the 1961–62 season.

A tall right-arm fast-medium bowler from Rhodesia, Lawrence was part of a new-look South African team for the series against New Zealand in 1961–62. Despite his success in the series and continued good form in the Currie Cup until the end of the 1965–66 season, he played no further Tests.

He took 8 for 53 in the Second Test in 1961–62. His best first-class bowling figures were 8 for 42 (after taking 3 for 56 and making 32 not out at number 10 in the first innings) for Rhodesia against Western Province in 1965–66. He played for Rhodesia from 1952–53 to 1965–66, then two matches for Natal B in 1966–67.

Lawrence later moved to Australia. His son Stephen was a leading Australian rules footballer in the 1990s.

Lawrence died in Brisbane on 12 March 2025, at the age of 92. Before his death he was the oldest living South African Test cricketer.
