= John Richard Reid =

New Zealand cricketer (1928–2020)

John Richard Reid CNZM OBE
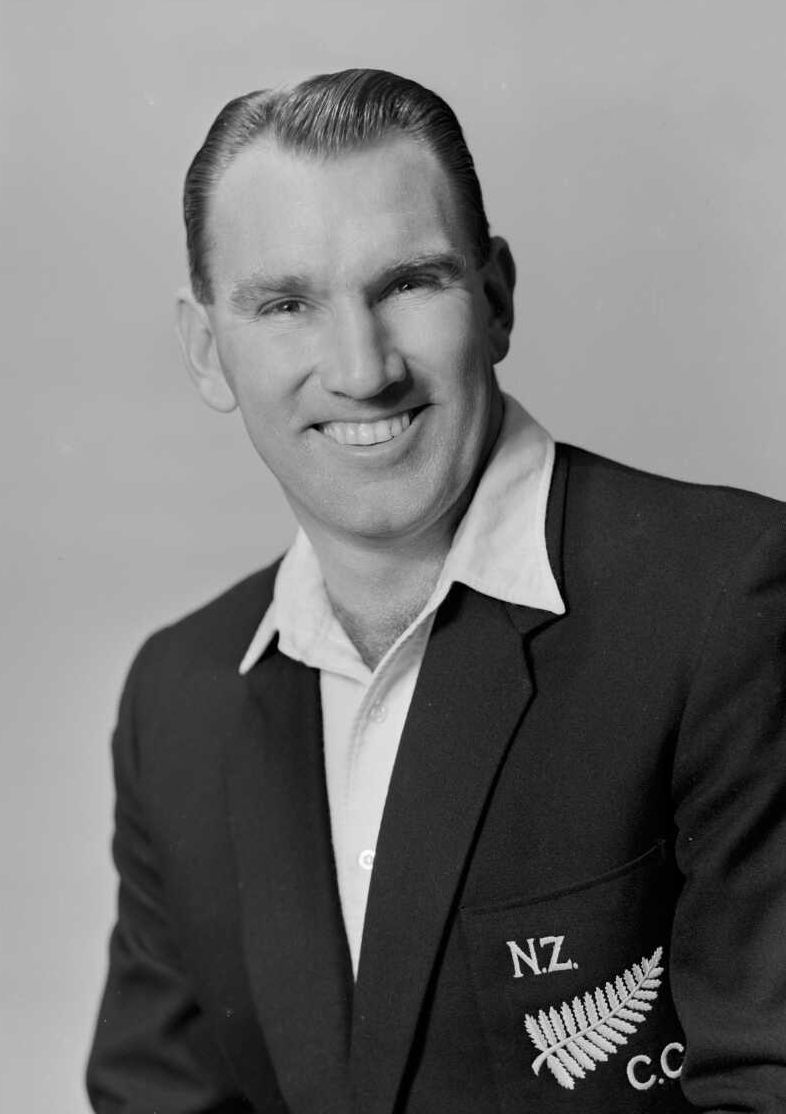
- Reid in 1960

Personal information
- Born: 3 June 1928; Auckland, New Zealand
- Died: 14 October 2020 (aged 92); Auckland, New Zealand
- Nickname: Bogo
- Batting: Right-handed
- Bowling: Right-arm off-break Right-arm fast-medium
- Relatives: Richard Reid (son)

International information
- National side: New Zealand (1949–1965)
- Test debut (cap 49): 23 July 1949 v England
- Last Test: 8 July 1965 v England

Domestic team information
- Years: Team
- 1947/48–1954/54: Wellington
- 1956/57–1957/58: Otago
- 1958/59–1964/65: Wellington

Career statistics
Competition	Test	First-class
Matches	58	246
Runs scored	3,428	16,128
Batting average	33.28	41.35
100s/50s	6/22	39/83
Top score	142	296
Balls bowled	7,725	29,270
Wickets	85	466
Bowling average	33.35	22.60
5 wickets in innings	1	15
10 wickets in match	0	1
Best bowling	6/60	7/20
Catches/stumpings	43/1	240/7
- Source: Cricinfo, 1 April 2017

John Richard Reid CNZM OBE (3 June 1928 – 14 October 2020) was a New Zealand cricketer who captained New Zealand in 34 Test matches. He was New Zealand's eighth Test captain and the first to achieve victory, both at home, against the West Indies in 1956, and away, against South Africa in 1962.

== Early life ==
Reid was born in Auckland in 1928 to Iris and Norman Reid. His father, Norman, was a Scottish-born rugby league player, while his mother, Iris, was a music teacher. The family moved to Wellington when Reid was young. He studied at the Hutt Valley High School, where he started out as a rugby union player but later switched to cricket, stemming from heart problems and bouts of rheumatic fever.

== Playing career ==
Reid started out as a strong and aggressive bowler who, in his early days, was genuinely quick. He later turned to off-cutters and spin from a short run-up with a trademark side-step. Until a swollen knee slowed down his movements and checked his agility, he was a strong and multi-talented fieldsman at slip and in the covers. On the 1949 tour of England he was the reserve wicketkeeper, keeping wicket in several matches including the final Test. "The figures mislead", said John Mehaffey, whose favourite Reid was. "Nobody who saw him at the crease would dispute his own assessment that he could have increased his batting average by half again if he had played in the 1980s team with Richard Hadlee and Martin Crowe." Reid was one of the Wisden Cricketers of the Year for 1959.

Reid never featured in an England-beating New Zealand Test team, but his men secured a narrow first-innings lead against Dexter's eleven in the Third Test in Christchurch in 1963. Unable to take advantage, they collapsed at the hands of Fred Trueman and Fred Titmus for 159 in their second innings, of which Reid hit exactly 100 before stumbling from the field in pallid enervation. The second-highest score was 22. This remains the lowest all-out Test match total to include a century.

In 1965 he captained a Rest of the World XI in a match against England. The match was drawn.

== Post playing-career ==
Post retirement, in 1969, Reid played in what is thought to be the first cricket match at the South Pole, with the striped barber's-type pole with a silver reflecting glass ball on top representing the actual Pole acting as the wicket. The match ended when Reid hit a six and the ball was unable to be found in the snow of the outfield. It has been noted that every shot he played, no matter where he hit it, travelled north.

Reid was a mentor for many younger players after he retired, in particular Bevan Congdon and Richard Collinge. He served New Zealand Cricket as a national selector from 1975 to 1978. In 1981, he moved to South Africa to be a coach. He had earlier noted that the sporting boycott of South Africa during its apartheid era was 'ill-conceived'.

He served as an International Cricket Council (ICC) match referee from 1993 through 2002, serving 50 Tests and 98 One Day International matches. As a match referee he was known for his tough actions. He had suspended Pakistan fast bowler, Waqar Younis, and had fined Azhar Mahmood for ball tampering. He had also acted on complaints on fast bowler Shoaib Akhtar's bowling action.

In 2003, he was appointed as the president of New Zealand Cricket. On the death of Trevor Barber on 7 August 2015, Reid became the oldest surviving New Zealand Test cricketer.

Reid was also involved in popularising squash in New Zealand. He set up the John Reid Squash centre in Wellington, which was subsequently sold off to the New Zealand Squash Rackets Association.

== Personal life ==
Reid married Norli Le Fevre in 1951; he had met her earlier at age 18 while she was working as a nurse at the hospital where he was being treated for rheumatic fever. The couple had one son, Richard, and two daughters, Alison and Ann. Richard played nine one-day internationals for New Zealand.

Reid died in Auckland on 14 October 2020, aged 92.

== Honours ==
In the 1962 Queen's Birthday Honours, Reid was appointed an Officer of the Order of the British Empire, for services to sport, especially cricket. He was made a Companion of the New Zealand Order of Merit, also for services to cricket, in the 2014 New Year Honours.

== Publications ==
Reid wrote two books, Sword of Willow (1962) and A Million Miles of Cricket (1966). Joseph Romanos wrote the biography John Reid: A Cricketing Life in 2000. John Reid is a 55-minute DVD made by the Vid Pro Quo company in 2003 of interviews with Reid by Grahame Thorne and footage of matches he played in.

== Citations ==
Sporting positions
Preceded by Harry Cave	New Zealand national cricket captain 1955/6–1965	Succeeded by Murray Chapple
