= South African cricket team in New Zealand in 1963–64 =

International cricket tour

The South Africa national cricket team toured New Zealand in February and March 1964 and played a three-match Test series against the New Zealand national cricket team. All three matches were drawn. Prior to this series, the South Africans had just played a five-Test series in Australiam, which was drawn 1–1.

== South African team ==
- Trevor Goddard (captain)
- Peter van der Merwe (vice-captain)
- Eddie Barlow
- Colin Bland
- Peter Carlstein
- Buster Farrer
- Clive Halse
- Denis Lindsay
- Joe Partridge
- David Pithey
- Tony Pithey
- Graeme Pollock
- Peter Pollock
- John Waite

Kelly Seymour, who had been with the team in Australia, returned to South Africa before the New Zealand leg of the tour to study for his medical exams. Graeme Pollock and Clive Halse were suffering from injuries, and Peter Carlstein returned to South Africa during the First Test when he received news that his wife and three of their four children had been killed in a car crash. For much of the tour only eleven players were available to play.

The manager was Ken Viljoen.

== Test series summary ==
=== First Test ===
21–25 February 1964 (4–day match)
Scorecard

South Africa	v	New Zealand
302 (131.5 overs); PL van der Merwe 44; FJ Cameron 3/58 (30 overs)		253 (152.5 overs); ME Chapple 59; PM Pollock 6/47 (31.5 overs)
218/2d (66 overs); EJ Barlow 92; JR Reid 1/55 (21 overs)		138/6 (76 overs); SG Gedye 52; PM Pollock 2/31 (16 overs)

Match drawn
Basin Reserve, Wellington
Umpires: DP Dumbleton and WT Martin

- South Africa won the toss and elected to bat.
- 23 February was taken as a rest day.
- SG Gedye and JT Ward (both NZ) made their Test debuts.

=== Second Test ===
28 February–3 March 1964 (4–day match)
Scorecard

New Zealand	v	South Africa
149 (94 overs); BW Sinclair 52; JT Partridge 4/51 (34 overs)		223 (105.2 overs); TL Goddard 63; JR Reid 6/60 (35 overs)
138 (84.5 overs); RW Blair 26*; DB Pithey 6/58 (35 overs)		42/3 (7 overs); KC Bland 16*; RW Blair 2/16 (3 overs)

Match drawn
Carisbrook, Dunedin
Umpires: DC Burns and HB Cassie

- New Zealand won the toss and elected to bat.
- 1 March was taken as a rest day.
- WP Bradburn (NZ) made his Test debut.
- South Africa were set 65 to win in 27 minutes.

=== Third Test ===
13–17 March 1964 (4–day match)
Scorecard

South Africa	v	New Zealand
371 (125.5 overs); KC Bland 83; RW Blair 4/85 (36 overs)		263 (131.3 overs); BW Sinclair 138; JT Partridge 6/86 (40 overs)
200/5d (64.4 overs); EJ Barlow 58; RW Blair 3/57 (21 overs)		191/8 (101 overs); SG Gedye 55; TL Goddard 4/18 (17 overs)

Match drawn
Eden Park, Auckland
Umpires: JMA Brown and ECA Mackintosh

- New Zealand won the toss and elected to field.
- 15 March was taken as a rest day.
- RS Cunis (NZ) made his Test debut.
- New Zealand were set 309 to win in 313 minutes. The last 13 minutes of play were lost to rain.
