= South African cricket team in Australia in 1963–64 =

International cricket tour

The South Africa national cricket team toured Australia in the 1963–64 season and played 5 Test matches against Australia. The series was drawn 1–1. After the series, the South Africans toured New Zealand, playing a three-Test series, where all three matches were drawn.

== South African team ==
- Trevor Goddard (captain)
- Peter van der Merwe (vice-captain)
- Eddie Barlow
- Colin Bland
- Peter Carlstein
- Buster Farrer
- Clive Halse
- Denis Lindsay
- Joe Partridge
- David Pithey
- Tony Pithey
- Graeme Pollock
- Peter Pollock
- Kelly Seymour
- John Waite

Of the 15 players, only Goddard (20 Tests), and Waite (41) had played more than six Tests. Seven players (van der Merwe, Halse, Lindsay, Partridge, David Pithey, Graeme Pollock and Seymour) had not yet played a Test; all made their Test debuts on the tour.

The manager was Ken Viljoen.

== Test series summary ==
=== First Test ===
6–11 December 1963
(5–day match)
Scorecard

Australia	v	South Africa
435 (114.6 overs); BC Booth 169; PM Pollock 6/95 (22.6 overs)		346 (135.5 overs); EJ Barlow 114; R Benaud 5/68 (33 overs)
144/1d (35 overs); WM Lawry 87*; JT Partridge 1/50 (17 overs)		13/1 (6.3 overs); TL Goddard 8* GD McKenzie 1/3 (3.3 overs)

Match drawn
Brisbane Cricket Ground, Woolloongabba, Brisbane
Umpires: CJ Egar and LP Rowan

- Australia won the toss and elected to bat.
- 8 December was taken as a rest day.
- There was no play on the third day.
- TR Veivers and AN Connolly (both AUS), and RG Pollock, DT Lindsay, PL van der Merwe, DB Pithey, MA Seymour and JT Partridge (all SA) made their Test debuts.

=== Second Test ===
1–6 January 1964
(5–day match)
Scorecard

South Africa	v	Australia
274 (78 overs); EJ Barlow 109; GD McKenzie 4/82 (19 overs)		447 (118.3 overs); WM Lawry 157; JT Partridge 4/108 (34 overs)
306 (101 overs); JHB Waite 77; NJN Hawke 3/53 (19 overs)		136/2 (37.1 overs); RB Simpson 55*; JT Partridge 1/49 (17 overs); EJ Barlow 1/49 (11 overs)

Australia won by 8 wickets
Melbourne Cricket Ground, Melbourne
Umpires: CJ Egar and LP Rowan

- Australia won the toss and elected to field.
- 5 January was taken as a rest day.
- IR Redpath (AUS) made his Test debut.

=== Third Test ===
10–15 January 1964
(5–day match)
Scorecard

Australia	v	South Africa
260 (62.6 overs); BC Booth 75 (152); PM Pollock 5/83 (18 overs)		302 (92.1 overs); RG Pollock 122 (237); R Benaud 3/55 (24.1 overs)
450/9d (100.5 overs); R Benaud 90 (187); JT Partridge 5/123 (32.5 overs)		326/5 (117 overs); KC Bland 85 (213); NJN Hawke 2/43 (19 overs)

Match drawn
Sydney Cricket Ground, Sydney
Umpires: CJ Egar and LP Rowan

- Australia won the toss and elected to bat.
- 12 January was taken as a rest day.
- CG Halse (SA) made his Test debut.

=== Fourth Test ===
24–29 January 1964
(5–day match)
Scorecard

Australia	v	South Africa
345 (93.6 overs); PJP Burge 91; TL Goddard 5/60 (24.6 overs)		595 (123.1 overs); EJ Barlow 201; NJN Hawke 6/139 (39 overs)
331 (89.3 overs); BK Shepherd 78; EJ Barlow 3/6 (5 overs)		82/0 (17 overs); EJ Barlow 47*

South Africa won by 10 wickets
Adelaide Oval, Adelaide
Umpires: CJ Egar and LP Rowan

- Australia won the toss and elected to bat.
- 26 January was taken as a rest day.

=== Fifth Test ===
7–12 February 1964
(5–day match)
Scorecard

Australia	v	South Africa
311 (92.1 overs); BC Booth 102* (233); JT Partridge 7/91 (31.1 overs)		411 (145 overs); KC Bland 126 (331); R Benaud 4/118 (49 overs)
270 (113.7 overs); BC Booth 87 (288); PM Pollock 3/35 (11 overs)		76/0 (24 overs); TL Goddard 44* (105)

Match drawn
Sydney Cricket Ground, Sydney
Umpires: CJ Egar and LP Rowan

- South Africa won the toss and elected to field.
- 9 February was taken as a rest day.

== Annual reviews ==
- Playfair Cricket Annual 1964
- Wisden Cricketers' Almanack 1965, pp. 818–38
