= International XI cricket team World Tour in 1961–62 =

An International XI cricket team toured several countries from February to April 1962 and played a total of eight first-class matches, these taking place in Kenya, Northern Rhodesia (now Zambia), Southern Rhodesia (now Zimbabwe), East Pakistan (now Bangladesh), New Zealand, India and Pakistan. The International XI was captained initially by West Indian Everton Weekes and later Australian Richie Benaud.

== Squad ==
The following players played one or more matches for the International XI

Player	Date of birth	Batting style	Bowling style	Country
Neil Adcock	8 March 1931	Right hand	Right arm fast	South Africa
Richie Benaud	6 October 1930	Right hand	Right arm leg spin	Australia
Colin Bland	5 April 1938	Right hand	Right arm medium	Rhodesia
Colin Cowdrey	24 December 1932	Right hand	Right arm leg spin	England
Ian Craig	12 June 1935	Right hand	–	Australia
Basil D'Oliveira	4 October 1931	Right hand	Right arm medium	England
Doug Ford (wk)	16 December 1928	Right hand	Wicket-keeper	Australia
Norman Gifford	30 March 1940	Left hand	Slow left-arm orthodox	England
Tom Graveney	16 June 1927	Right hand	Right arm leg spin	England
Subhash Gupte	11 December 1929	Right hand	Right arm leg spin	West Indies
Hanif Mohammad	21 December 1934	Right hand	Right arm offbreak	Pakistan
David Larter	24 April 1940	Right hand	Right arm fast	England
Ray Lindwall	3 October 1921	Right hand	Right arm fast	Australia
Roy Marshall	25 April 1930	Right hand	Right arm offbreak	West Indies
Colin McDonald	17 November 1928	Right hand	–	Australia
Roy McLean	9 July 1930	Right hand	–	South Africa
Ian Meckiff	6 January 1935	Right hand	Left arm fast	Australia
Ramanbhai Patel	1925	Unknown	–	Kenya
Sonny Ramadhin	1 May 1929	Right hand	Right arm off spin	West Indies
Harold Rhodes	22 July 1936	Right hand	Right arm fast	England
Saeed Ahmed	1 October 1937	Right hand	Right arm off spin	Pakistan
Bob Simpson	3 February 1936	Right hand	Right arm leg spin	Australia
Harold Stephenson (wk)	18 July 1920	Right hand	Wicket-keeper	England
Raman Subba Row	29 January 1932	Left hand	Left arm chinaman	England
Everton Weekes	26 February 1925	Right hand	Right arm leg spin	West Indies

== Tour schedule ==
- 10 Feb 1962 - vs East Africa at Nairobi
- 14 Feb 1962 - vs HA Collins' XI at Athletic Club, Nakuru
- 17 Feb 1962 - vs Rhodesia at Ek Park, Kitwe
- 21 Feb 1962 - vs Rhodesia Country Districts at Country Club, Ruwa
- 24 Feb 1962 - vs Rhodesia at Showground, Bulawayo
- 28 Feb 1962 - vs Rhodesia Colts at Que Que Sports Club, Que Que
- 3 Mar 1962 - vs Rhodesian Invitation XI at Police A Ground, Salisbury
- 6 Mar 1962 - vs Kenya at Nairobi
- 10 Mar 1962 - vs East Pakistan Governor's XI at Dacca Stadium, Dacca
- 16 Mar 1962 - vs New Zealand XI at Lancaster Park, Christchurch
- 20 Mar 1962 - vs Wellington at Basin Reserve, Wellington
- 22 Mar 1962 - vs New Zealand Cricket Council President's XI at Eden Park, Auckland
- 27 Mar 1962 - vs Hong Kong Island XI at Hong Kong Cricket Club Ground, Hong Kong
- 28 Mar 1962 - vs Hong Kong Mainland XI at Hong Kong Cricket Club Ground, Hong Kong
- 29 Mar 1962 - vs Hong Kong at Hong Kong Cricket Club Ground, Hong Kong
- 31 Mar 1962 - vs Cricket Club of India President's XI at Brabourne Stadium, Bombay
- 6 Apr 1962 - vs BCCP XI at National Stadium, Karachi

== vs East Africa ==
10–12 February 1962
scorecard

International XI	v	East Africa
346 (73.1 overs); Hanif Mohammad 178; C. D. Patel 3/92 (20 overs)		156 (60.3 overs); C. D. Patel 36; Subhash Gupte 6/76 (26.3 overs)
301/7d (47.2 overs); Basil D'Oliveira 101*; Ghafoor Ahmed 2/5 (1.2 overs)		471 (143.2 overs); Gerry Jarman 131; Roy Marshall 3/85 (21 overs)

International XI won by 20 runs
Sikh Union Club Ground, Nairobi

== vs Rhodesia ==
17–19 February 1962
scorecard

International XI	v	Rhodesia
234 (72 overs); Tom Graveney 112; Joe Partridge 5/25 (21 overs)		247 (92 overs); Tony Pithey 115; Subhash Gupte 3/77 (28 overs)
123/3 (40.5 overs); Tom Graveney 52*; Joe Partridge 2/39 (16 overs)

Match drawn
Ek Park, Kitwe

== vs Rhodesia ==
24–26 February 1962
scorecard

Rhodesia	v	International XI
287 (110.1 overs); Colin Bland 60; Norman Gifford 3/77 (30 overs)		305 (105 overs); Colin McDonald 70; Joe Partridge 4/54 (23 overs)
210 (87 overs); Ian Haig 44; Norman Gifford 3/72 (29 overs)		196/4 (43.5 overs); Hanif Mohammad 86; Joe Partridge 6/69 (18.5 overs)

International XI won by 6 wickets
Bulawayo Showgrounds, Bulawayo

== vs Rhodesian Invitation XI ==
scorecard

International XI	v	Rhodesia Invitation XI
294 (101.4 overs); Colin McDonald 82; Joe Partridge 3/71 (31 overs)		232 (73.5 overs); Ray Gripper 67; Saeed Ahmed 6/32 (9.5 overs)
154 (59.1 overs); Tom Graveney 70; Joe Partridge 5/42 (21.1 overs)		217/5 (54.4 overs); Denis Lindsay 84; Sonny Ramadhin 3/52 (13.4 overs)

Rhodesian Invitation XI won by 5 wickets
Police A Ground, Salisbury

== vs East Pakistan Governor's XI ==
10–12 March 1962
scorecard

East Pakistan Governor's XI	v	International XI
385/5d (126.3 overs); Saeed Ahmed 149; David Larter 2/68 (27 overs)		266 (106.1 overs); Colin Bland 89; Mahmood Hussain 3/58 (21 overs)
94/6; Asif Ahmed 30; Norman Gifford 2/24 (10 overs)

Match drawn
Dacca Stadium, Dacca

== vs New Zealand XI ==
scorecard

New Zealand XI	v	International XI
207 (86.3 overs); Graham Dowling 67; Richie Benaud 5/49 (25 overs)		414/7d (109.4 overs); Bob Simpson 167; Jack Alabaster 3/106 (25.4 overs)
241 (77.5 overs); Noel McGregor 72; Richie Benaud 5/62 (21 overs)		35/2 (12.5 overs); Doug Ford 22; Noel McGregor 1/5 (4 overs)

International XI won by 8 wickets
Lancaster Park, Christchurch

== vs Wellington ==
20–21 March 1962
scorecard

Wellington	v	International XI
105 (45.1 overs); Paul Barton 33; Sonny Ramadhin 4/19 (11 overs)		143/1 (41 overs); Bob Simpson 73; Bruce Morrison 1/36 (8 overs)

Match drawn
Basin Reserve, Wellington

- Rain prevented play on the final day

== vs New Zealand President's XI ==
22–24 March 1962
scorecard

New Zealand President's XI	v	International XI
285 (91.3 overs); Graham Dowling 67; Sonny Ramadhin 4/98 (30 overs)		295 (88.2 overs); Tom Graveney 92; Tony MacGibbon 2/4 (1.3 overs)
301/8d Bill Playle 94*; Sonny Ramadhin 2/57 (22 overs)		292/8 (89.5 overs); Tom Graveney 116*; John R. Reid 3/74 (27 overs)

International XI won by 2 wickets
Eden Park, Auckland

== vs India President's XI ==
31 March-3 April 1962
scorecard

International XI	v	India President's XI
518 (131.5 overs); Bob Simpson 104; Padmakar Shivalkar 5/129 (39.5 overs)		472 (145 overs); Sudhakar Adhikari 150; Bob Simpson 3/129 (29 overs)
253 (70 overs); Richie Benaud 64; Balkrishna Gupte 4/92 (25 overs)		214/6 (58 overs); Vijay Bhosle 52; Richie Benaud 5/57 (18 overs)

Match drawn
Brabourne Stadium, Bombay

- India President's XI won the toss and decided to field

== vs BCCP XI ==
6–9 April 1962
scorecard

BCCP XI	v	International XI
310 (99.5 overs); Mushtaq Mohammad 131; Sonny Ramadhin 3/71 (25.5 overs)		420/5d (125 overs); Bob Simpson 167; Mahmood Hussain 2/79 (30 overs)
259 (112.2 overs); Hanif Mohammad 65; Richie Benaud 3/62 (35.2 overs)		152/1 (36.4 overs); Bob Simpson 76; Mahmood Hussain 1/47 (11 overs)

International XI won by 9 wickets
National Stadium, Karachi

- BCCP XI won the toss and decided to bat
