= English cricket team in South Africa in 1964–65 =

International cricket tour

England in South Africa in 1964–65
	England	South Africa
- Dates: October 1964 – February 1965
Captains	Mike Smith	Trevor Goddard

Test series
- Result: England won the 5-match series 1–0
Most runs	Ken Barrington (508)	Colin Bland (572)
Most wickets	Fred Titmus (18)	Peter Pollock (12)

The England cricket team toured South Africa from October 1964 to February 1965, playing five Test matches against the South Africa national cricket team. England won the first Test, but the remaining four matches finished as draws, giving England a 1–0 series victory.

== Test series ==
=== 1st Test ===
4–8 December 1964
Scorecard

England	v	South Africa
485/5d (190 overs); KF Barrington 148*; JT Partridge 3/85 (45 overs)		155 (74.5 overs); DT Lindsay 38; DA Allen 5/41 (19.5 overs)
		226 (122.5 overs; f/o); KC Bland 68; FJ Titmus 5/66 (45.5 overs)

England won by an innings and 104 runs
Kingsmead, Durban
Umpires: JG Draper (SA) and HC Kidson (SA)

- England won the toss and elected to bat
- GD Varnals (SA) and NI Thomson (Eng) made their Test debuts.
- 6 December was taken as a rest day.

=== 2nd Test ===
23–29 December 1964
Scorecard

England	v	South Africa
531 (166.3 overs); ER Dexter 172; PM Pollock 5/129 (38.3 overs)		317 (159.5 overs); AJ Pithey 85; FJ Titmus 4/73 (39.5 overs)
		336/6 (140 overs; f/o); KC Bland 144*; DA Allen 4/87 (49 overs)

Match drawn
New Wanderers Stadium, Johannesburg
Umpires: LM Baxter (SA) and HC Kidson (SA)

- England won the toss and elected to bat.
- 25 and 27 December were taken as rest days.

=== 3rd Test ===
1–6 January 1965
Scorecard

South Africa	v	England
501/7d (179.2 overs); AJ Pithey 154; DA Allen 2/79 (40 overs)		442 (205.2 overs); MJK Smith 121; HD Bromfield 5/88 (57.2 overs)
346 (119.1 overs); EJ Barlow 78; KF Barrington 3/4 (3.1 overs)		15/0 (8 overs); KF Barrington 14* (31)

Match drawn
Newlands, Cape Town
Umpires: VJ Costello (SA) and JE Warner (SA)

- South Africa won the toss and elected to bat.
- GG Hall (SA) made his Test debut.
- 3 January was taken as a rest day.

=== 4th Test ===
22–27 January 1965
Scorecard

South Africa	v	England
390/6d (146 overs); EJ Barlow 96 (192); JSE Price 2/68 (17 overs)		384 (147.2 overs); PH Parfitt 122* (289); AH McKinnon 4/128 (51 overs)
307/3d (88 overs); TL Goddard 112; JSE Price 1/56 (14 overs)		153/6 (87 overs); G Boycott 76* (247); AH McKinnon 3/44 (35 overs)

Match drawn
New Wanderers Stadium, Johannesburg
Umpires: LM Baxter (SA) and HC Kidson (SA)

- England won the toss and elected to field.
- 24 January was taken as a rest day.

=== 5th Test ===
12–17 February 1965
Scorecard

South Africa	v	England
502 (189.1 overs); RG Pollock 137 (236); DA Allen 3/80 (44 overs)		435 (207.5 overs); G Boycott 117 (396); EJ Barlow 3/55 (22 overs)
178/4d (60 overs); RG Pollock 77* (77); NI Thomson 2/55 (25 overs)		29/1 (19.2 overs); JT Murray 8* MJ Macaulay 1/10 (9 overs)

Match drawn
Crusaders Ground, Port Elizabeth
Umpires: LM Baxter (SA) and HC Kidson (SA)

- South Africa won the toss and elected to bat.
- MJ Macaulay (SA) and KE Palmer (Eng) made their Test debuts.
- 14 February was taken as a rest day.
