= South African Universities cricket team =

South African Universities are a former first-class cricket team in South Africa. They played 35 first-class friendly matches, usually one match per season, between March 1949 and January 1990.

== Matches ==
South African Universities played their first first-class match in 1948–49 against the touring MCC, who won by an innings. Their next first-class match was also against the MCC, in 1956–57, and ended with the same result. David Pithey took 5 for 100 in the MCC innings.

They won their next match, in 1957–58 against North Eastern Transvaal, when Colin Bland scored 131 on his first-class debut and Pithey and Peter van der Merwe shared most of the wickets. Later that season they drew their match against the Australians, Tony Pithey scoring 126 and his brother David taking 5 for 105.

From 1960 to 1961 – when Glen Hall took 4 for 24 and 9 for 122 (South African Universities' best innings and match figures) on his first-class debut, and Colin Bland scored 124 and Eric Brotherton scored 164 not out (South African Universities' highest individual score) to defeat Western Province by an innings – South African Universities played annually, usually against a provincial team, and usually in early December. In their seven matches against provincial teams in the 1960s they won four: twice against Western Province, once against Transvaal, and once against Orange Free State.

From June to August 1967 South African Universities toured England, playing 21 matches, of which they won ten and lost only one. Two matches were first-class, against Cambridge University, which was drawn, and Oxford University, which South African Universities won by an innings.

In the 1970s South African Universities played 10 matches, all of them against provincial teams, winning two and losing six. In the match against Western Province in 1978–79, the Universities won by scoring 500 for 7 in the fourth innings. Adrian Kuiper top-scored with 110 not out, after taking 6 for 96 in the first innings.

They played nine matches from 1980–81 to 1989–90, losing four and drawing five. Several matches were close, however: they lost to Northern Transvaal by four runs in 1980–81 and had the better of draws against Border in 1983–84, the Australian XI in 1985–86 and the England XI in 1989–90, which was South African Universities' last first-class match.

Of their 35 first-class matches, South African Universities won eight, lost 16 and drew 11.

== Test players ==
Many South African Universities players went on to play Test cricket. Of the team in the first match in 1949, Jack Nel, John Waite, Anton Murray, Ian Smith and Cuan McCarthy all went on to play Tests. Six future Test players – Tony Pithey, Derek Varnals, Colin Wesley, David Pithey, Peter van der Merwe and Clive Halse – were in the team in 1956–57. From the last match in 1990, Andrew Hudson, Hansie Cronje, Clive Eksteen and Tertius Bosch all played Test cricket.
