= International cricket in 1962–63 =

International cricket season

The 1962–63 international cricket season was from September 1962 to April 1963.

== Season overview ==
International tours
Start date	Home team	Away team	Results [Matches]			
Start date	Home team	Away team	Test	ODI	FC	LA
30 November 1962	Australia	England	1–1 [5]	—	—	—
23 February 1963	New Zealand	England	0–3 [3]	—	—	—
29 March 1963	South Africa	Cavaliers	—	—	0–1 [1]	—

== November ==
=== England in Australia ===
The Ashes Test series
No.	Date	Home captain	Away captain	Venue	Result
Test 535	30 Nov–5 December	Richie Benaud	Ted Dexter	The Gabba, Brisbane	Match drawn
Test 536	29 Dec–3 January	Richie Benaud	Ted Dexter	Melbourne Cricket Ground, Melbourne	England by 7 wickets
Test 537	11–15 January	Richie Benaud	Ted Dexter	Sydney Cricket Ground, Sydney	Australia by 8 wickets
Test 538	25–30 January	Richie Benaud	Ted Dexter	Adelaide Oval, Adelaide	Match drawn
Test 539	15–20 February	Richie Benaud	Ted Dexter	Sydney Cricket Ground, Sydney	Match drawn

== February ==
=== England in New Zealand ===
Test series
No.	Date	Home captain	Away captain	Venue	Result
Test 540	23–27 February	John Reid	Ted Dexter	Eden Park, Auckland	England by an innings and 215 runs
Test 541	1–4 March	John Reid	Ted Dexter	Basin Reserve, Wellington	England by an innings and 47 runs
Test 542	15–19 March	John Reid	Ted Dexter	AMI Stadium, Christchurch	England by 7 wickets

== March ==
=== International Cavaliers in South Africa ===
First-class match
No.	Date	Home captain	Away captain	Venue	Result
Match	29 Mar–1 April	(South African Republic) Trevor Goddard	Richie Benaud	The Wanderers Stadium, Johannesburg	Cavaliers by 6 wickets
