= International cricket in 1963–64 =

International cricket season

The 1963–64 international cricket season was from September 1963 to April 1964.

== Season overview ==
International tours
Start date	Home team	Away team	Results [Matches]			
Start date	Home team	Away team	Test	ODI	FC	LA
15 November 1963	Pakistan	Commonwealth XI	0–0 [3]	—	—	—
6 December 1963	Australia	South Africa	1–1 [5]	—	—	—
9 January 1964	Jamaica	Cavaliers	—	—	0–2 [3]	—
10 January 1964	India	England	0–0 [5]	—	—	—
21 February 1964	New Zealand	South Africa	0–0 [3]	—	—	—
7 March 1964	Ceylon	India	—	—	1–0 [1]	—

== November ==
=== Commonwealth XI in Pakistan ===
Test series
No.	Date	Home captain	Away captain	Venue	Result
Match 1	15–20 November	Not mentioned	Not mentioned	National Stadium, Karachi	Match drawn
Match 2	29 Nov–4 December	Not mentioned	Not mentioned	Gaddafi Stadium, Lahore	Match drawn
Match 3	6–11 December	Not mentioned	Not mentioned	Bangabandhu National Stadium, Dhaka	Match drawn

== December ==
=== South Africa in Australia ===
Test series
No.	Date	Home captain	Away captain	Venue	Result
Test 548	6–11 December	Richie Benaud	Trevor Goddard	The Gabba, Brisbane	Match drawn
Test 549	1–6 January	Bob Simpson	Trevor Goddard	Melbourne Cricket Ground, Melbourne	Australia by 8 wickets
Test 550	10–15 January	Bob Simpson	Trevor Goddard	Sydney Cricket Ground, Sydney	Match drawn
Test 553	24–29 January	Bob Simpson	Trevor Goddard	Adelaide Oval, Adelaide	South Africa by 10 wickets
Test 555	7–12 February	Bob Simpson	Trevor Goddard	Sydney Cricket Ground, Sydney	Match drawn

== January ==
=== International Cavaliers in the West Indies ===
First-class Series
No.	Date	Home captain	Away captain	Venue	Result
Match 1	9–11 January	(Jamaica) Jackie Hendriks	John Murray	Sabina Park, Kingston	Match drawn
Match 2	15–18 January	(Jamaica) Jackie Hendriks	Ted Dexter	Sabina Park, Kingston	Cavaliers by 4 wickets
Match 3	22–25 January	(Jamaica) Jackie Hendriks	Denis Compton	Sabina Park, Kingston	Cavaliers by 5 wickets

=== England in India ===
Test series
No.	Date	Home captain	Away captain	Venue	Result
Test 551	10–15 January	Mansoor Ali Khan Pataudi	Mike Smith	Corporation Stadium, Madras	Match drawn
Test 552	21–26 January	Mansoor Ali Khan Pataudi	Mike Smith	Brabourne Stadium, Bombay	Match drawn
Test 554	29 Jan–3 February	Mansoor Ali Khan Pataudi	Mike Smith	Eden Gardens, Calcutta	Match drawn
Test 556	8–13 February	Mansoor Ali Khan Pataudi	Mike Smith	Feroz Shah Kotla Ground, Delhi	Match drawn
Test 557	15–20 February	Mansoor Ali Khan Pataudi	Mike Smith	Green Park, Kanpur	Match drawn

== February ==
=== South Africa in New Zealand ===
Test series
No.	Date	Home captain	Away captain	Venue	Result
Test 558	21–25 February	John Reid	Trevor Goddard	Basin Reserve, Wellington	Match drawn
Test 559	28 Feb–3 March	John Reid	Trevor Goddard	Carisbrook, Dunedin	Match drawn
Test 560	13–17 March	John Reid	Trevor Goddard	Eden Park, Auckland	Match drawn

== March ==
=== India in Ceylon ===
MJ Gopalan Trophy
No.	Date	Home captain	Away captain	Venue	Result
FC Match	7–9 March	Conroy Gunasekera	Kripal Singh	P Saravanamuttu Stadium, Colombo	Ceylon by 6 wickets
