= International cricket in 1966–67 =

International cricket season

The 1966–67 international cricket season was from September 1966 to April 1967.

== Season overview ==
International tours
Start date	Home team	Away team	Results [Matches]			
Start date	Home team	Away team	Test	ODI	FC	LA
12 November 1966	Pakistan	Ceylon	—	—	3–0 [3]	—
13 December 1966	India	West Indies	0–2 [3]	—	—	—
23 December 1966	South Africa	Australia	3–1 [5]	—	—	—
21 January 1967	Ceylon	West Indies	—	—	0–0 [1]	—
3 March 1967	New Zealand	Australia	—	—	1–0 [4]	—
4 March 1967	India	Ceylon	—	—	0–0 [1]	—

== November ==
=== Ceylon in Pakistan ===
Unofficial Test Series
No.	Date	Home captain	Away captain	Venue	Result
FC 1	12–15 November	Hanif Mohammad	Michael Tissera	Gaddafi Stadium, Lahore	Pakistan by 10 wickets
FC 2	18–21 November	Hanif Mohammad	Michael Tissera	Dacca Stadium, Dhaka	Pakistan by an innings and 37 runs
FC 3	25–28 November	Hanif Mohammad	Michael Tissera	National Stadium, Karachi	Pakistan by an innings and 35 runs

== December ==
=== West Indies in India ===
Test series
No.	Date	Home captain	Away captain	Venue	Result
Test 610	13–18 December	Mansoor Ali Khan Pataudi	Garfield Sobers	Brabourne Stadium, Bombay	West Indies by 6 wickets
Test 612	31 Dec–5 January	Mansoor Ali Khan Pataudi	Garfield Sobers	Eden Gardens, Calcutta	West Indies by an innings and 45 runs
Test 614	13–18 January	Mansoor Ali Khan Pataudi	Garfield Sobers	MA Chidambaram Stadium, Madras	Match drawn

=== Australia in South Africa ===
Test series
No.	Date	Home captain	Away captain	Venue	Result
Test 611	23–28 December	Peter van der Merwe	Bob Simpson	New Wanderers Stadium, Johannesburg	South Africa by 233 runs
Test 613	31 Dec–5 January	Peter van der Merwe	Bob Simpson	Newlands, Cape Town	Australia by 6 wickets
Test 615	20–25 January	Peter van der Merwe	Bob Simpson	Kingsmead, Durban	South Africa by 8 wickets
Test 616	3–8 February	Peter van der Merwe	Bob Simpson	New Wanderers Stadium, Johannesburg	Match drawn
Test 617	24–28 February	Peter van der Merwe	Bob Simpson	Crusaders Ground, Port Elizabeth	South Africa by 7 wickets

== January ==
=== West Indies in Ceylon ===
First-class Match
No.	Date	Home captain	Away captain	Venue	Result
FC 1	21–23 January	Michael Tissera	Garfield Sobers	P Saravanamuttu Stadium, Colombo	Match drawn

== March ==
=== Australia in New Zealand ===
First-class series
No.	Date	Home captain	Away captain	Venue	Result
FC 1	3–7 March	Barry Sinclair	Les Favell	Pukekura Park, New Plymouth	New Zealand by 159 runs
FC 2	10–14 March	Barry Sinclair	Les Favell	Carisbrook, Dunedin	Match drawn
FC 3	16–20 March	Barry Sinclair	Les Favell	AMI Stadium, Christchurch	Match drawn
FC 4	25–29 March	Barry Sinclair	Les Favell	Eden Park, Auckland	Match drawn

=== Ceylon in India ===
MJ Gopalan Trophy
No.	Date	Home captain	Away captain	Venue	Result
FC Match	4–6 March	Patamada Belliappa	Ian Pieris	Kajamalai Stadium, Tiruchi	Match drawn
