= Ugandan cricket team in Kenya in 1955–56 =

Ugandan national cricket team tour

The Ugandan national cricket team toured Kenya in November 1955 and played one three-day match against the Kenyan team. It was part of a series of occasional matches against countries in east Africa which would eventually lead to a formal triangular tournament being introduced in 1967.

== Only match ==
5–7 November 1955
Scorecard

Kenya	v	Uganda
282 (101.3 overs); Ghafoor Ahmed 84; Premji Patel 5/45 (24.3 overs)		198 (110.2 overs); D. Emery 45; G.B. Jhalla 4/41 (37 overs)
60/3d (24 overs); Ramanbhai Patel 24; John Wild 2/32 (12 overs)		139 (37.2 overs); Allan Boucher 36; G.B. Jhalla 6/66 (19 overs)

Kenya won by 5 runs
Railway European Club Ground, Nairobi

- Toss not known
