= Kelly Seymour =

South African cricketer (1936–2019)

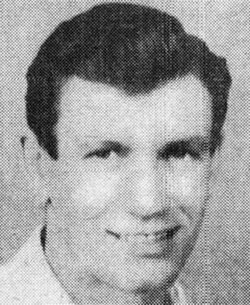
- Seymour in 1963

Personal information
- Full name: Michael Arthur Seymour
- Born: 5 June 1936; Kokstad, Cape Province, South Africa
- Died: 17 February 2019 (aged 82); Cape Town, South Africa
- Nickname: Kelly
- Batting: Right-handed
- Bowling: Right-arm off-spin

International information
- National side: South Africa
- Test debut: 6 December 1963 v Australia
- Last Test: 22 January 1970 v Australia

Domestic team information
- Years: Team
- 1960/61–1969/70: Western Province

Career statistics
Competition	Test	First-class
Matches	7	38
Runs scored	84	569
Batting average	12.00	14.22
100s/50s	0/0	0/1
Top score	36	62
Balls bowled	1,458	8,252
Wickets	9	111
Bowling average	65.33	29.52
5 wickets in innings	0	7
10 wickets in match	0	1
Best bowling	3/80	7/80
Catches/stumpings	2/–	16/–
- Source: Cricinfo, 23 June 2016

Michael Arthur "Kelly" Seymour (5 June 1936 – 17 February 2019) was a South African cricketer who played in seven Test matches between 1963 and 1970.

== Career ==
A right-arm off-break bowler and lower-order batsman, Seymour made his first-class debut for Western Province against South African Universities in 1960–61. In his next match, while studying medicine at the University of Cape Town, he played for South African Universities against the New Zealand touring side in Pretoria in 1961–62, taking 7 for 80 and 5 for 72, which remained his career-best innings and match figures. Seeking a replacement off-spinner for the retired Hugh Tayfield, the national selectors chose him later in the same tour for a South African Colts XI against the New Zealanders and, after a reasonably successful season in 1962–63 (15 wickets at 33.66), for the tour to Australia and New Zealand in 1963–64.

He took 15 wickets at 33.06 in the matches leading up to the First Test in Brisbane, but took no wickets in the Test. In the next match against Tasmania he took 5 for 65 and 2 for 60, and kept his place for the Second Test. He took only one wicket and was left out of the Third Test but returned for the Fourth Test, replacing David Pithey, who had taken no wickets in the three Tests. He took only one wicket but South Africa won and he kept his place and took his best Test figures of 3 for 80 (off 38 eight-ball overs) in the second innings of the Fifth Test. He missed the New Zealand leg of the tour, returning home for the final examinations of his medical studies. He was unsuccessful in the first two Tests in the home series against England the following season, taking only two wickets at high cost.

Seymour played no first-class cricket between December 1964 and November 1968, when he returned to play for Western Province in the "B" Section of the Currie Cup, taking 21 wickets at 15.95 in the season and forming a potent spin partnership with Grahame Chevalier and taking Western Province to victory in the "B" Section. He maintained his form when Western Province returned to the "A" Section in 1969–70 and, along with Chevalier, was selected for the First Test of the series against Australia. He took 1 for 28 and 1 for 40 and South Africa won easily, but he was dropped from the Test team in favour of John Traicos, and played only one further first-class match before retiring at the end of the season.

He made his only first-class 50 in the match against South Australia in 1963–64 when, coming in with the score at 194 for 8, he hit 62 in a partnership of 108 in 75 minutes with Denis Lindsay.
