= Eric Brotherton =

South African cricketer and squash player

Personal information
- Full name: Eric James Brotherton
- Born: 7 May 1938; Ventersburg, Orange Free State, South Africa
- Died: 6 November 2022 (aged 84)
- Batting: Right-handed
- Bowling: Right-arm medium-pace

Domestic team information
- Years: Team
- 1959–60 to 1960–61: Eastern Province
- 1963–64 to 1969–70: North Eastern Transvaal

Career statistics
Competition	First-class
Matches	39
Runs scored	1866
Batting average	28.27
100s/50s	2/10
Top score	164 not out
Balls bowled	462
Wickets	3
Bowling average	67.00
5 wickets in innings	0
10 wickets in match	0
Best bowling	2/50
Catches/stumpings	24/0
- Source: Cricinfo, 7 August 2014

Eric James Brotherton (7 May 1938 – 6 November 2022) was a South African cricketer and squash player.

Brotherton made his first-class debut in 1959–60, opening the batting for Eastern Province with his captain Geoff Dakin and scoring 215 runs at an average of 23.88, with most of his innings exceeding 20 but with a top score of 33. In 1960–61, when Eastern Province had their best season in the Currie Cup, finishing second with four wins from six matches, Brotherton scored 336 runs at 30.54. He also played a first-class match for South African Universities, hitting 164 not out, the record score for the Universities team, against Western Province, putting on 227 for the fourth wicket with Colin Bland.

After a two-season gap he played for North Eastern Transvaal in 1963–64, leading the team's aggregates and averages with 308 runs at 30.80. He captained North Eastern Transvaal in 1964–65. When North Eastern Transvaal won Section B of the Currie Cup in 1965–66 he made 376 runs at 41.77, scoring 111 in the first match of the season. He played on with less success until 1969–70.

In the 1960s, Brotherton played squash for South Africa. In 2002 he was awarded the Leo Melvill Memorial Award, an annual prize for significant contribution to the development, growth and enjoyment of squash in South Africa. In the early 2000s, the annual Brotherton Cup national doubles tournament was instituted in his honour.
