= Leslie Baxter =

Leslie Baxter may refer to:

- Leslie Baxter (umpire) (1916–2002), South African cricket umpire
- Leslie A. Baxter (born 1949), American scholar and teacher in communication studies
- Les Baxter (1922–1996), American musician, composer and conductor
