= International cricket in 1965 =

International cricket season

The 1965 International cricket season was held between May 1965 and August 1965.

== Season overview ==
International tours
Start date	Home team	Away team	Results [Matches]			
Start date	Home team	Away team	Test	ODI	FC	LA
27 May 1965	England	New Zealand	3–0 [3]	—	—	—
22 July 1965	England	South Africa	0–1 [3]	—	—	—

== May ==
=== New Zealand in England ===
Test series
No.	Date	Home captain	Away captain	Venue	Result
Test 591	27 May–1 June	Mike Smith	John Reid	Edgbaston Cricket Ground, Birmingham	England by 9 wickets
Test 592	17–22 June	Mike Smith	John Reid	Lord's, London	England by 7 wickets
Test 593	8–13 July	Mike Smith	John Reid	Headingley Cricket Ground, Leeds	England by an innings and 187 runs

== July ==
=== South Africa in England ===
Test series
No.	Date	Home captain	Away captain	Venue	Result
Test 594	22–27 July	Mike Smith	Peter van der Merwe	Lord's, London	Match drawn
Test 595	5–9 August	Mike Smith	Peter van der Merwe	Trent Bridge, Nottingham	South Africa by 94 runs
Test 596	26–31 August	Mike Smith	Peter van der Merwe	Kennington Oval, London	Match drawn
