= Wynne Bradburn =

New Zealand cricketer

Personal information
- Full name: Wynne Pennell Bradburn
- Born: 24 November 1938; Thames, Waikato, New Zealand
- Died: 25 September 2008 (aged 69); Hamilton, New Zealand
- Height: 6 ft 3 in (1.91 m)
- Batting: Right-handed
- Bowling: Right-arm offbreak
- Relatives: Grant Bradburn (son)

International information
- National side: New Zealand (1964)
- Test debut (cap 100): 28 February 1964 v South Africa
- Last Test: 13 March 1964 v South Africa

Domestic team information
- Years: Team
- 1957/58–1968/69: Northern Districts

Career statistics
Competition	Test	First-class
Matches	2	57
Runs scored	62	2,077
Batting average	15.50	20.36
100s/50s	0/0	1/7
Top score	32	107
Balls bowled	–	2,071
Wickets	–	19
Bowling average	–	42.31
5 wickets in innings	–	0
10 wickets in match	–	0
Best bowling	–	2/13
Catches/stumpings	2/–	66/–
- Source: Cricinfo, 1 April 2017

Wynne Pennell Bradburn (24 November 1938 – 25 September 2008) was a New Zealand cricketer who played in two Test matches against South Africa in 1964.

== Cricket career ==
Bradburn, described as "a fairly dour opening bat who was hard to dismiss", played first-class cricket for Northern Districts from 1957 to 1969. In the 1962–63 season, when Northern Districts won the Plunket Shield for the first time, he played a crucial part in the low-scoring victory over Central Districts: Northern Districts needed 114 to win and were 66 for 5, but he guided them to victory with 58 not out.

He was one of the leading players in the 1963-64 Plunket Shield, with 282 runs in the five-match competition at an average of 31.33 and 13 catches. In the second innings of the final match, against Wellington, he made 98, his highest score to date; he also took three wickets in the match with his off-spin. He replaced the injured opener Graham Dowling for the second and third Tests of the series against South Africa that followed the Plunket Shield season. He was the 100th Test cap for New Zealand. He began with 32 in his first innings when New Zealand totalled 149, but was less successful thereafter, finishing with 62 runs in four innings.

Bradburn made his only first-class century in 1965–66, when he scored 107 (out of a team total of 210) and 59 against Auckland. He twice carried his bat in first-class matches.

He also played in the Hawke Cup from 1955 to 1975. He captained Waikato and made 91 in the first innings when they took the title from Hawke's Bay in 1968–69.

After Bradburn's playing career ended, he served as an administrator, selector and coach in Northern Districts cricket.

== Personal life ==
Bradburn suffered from diabetes throughout his adult life, and as a consequence had both legs amputated in his later years. He died of a heart attack in September 2008 just hours after the funeral of his wife Olwyn. They were both aged 69, and had been married 48 years. Their son Grant also had a long career for Northern Districts and represented New Zealand in seven Test matches between 1990 and 2001.
