= Clive Halse =

South African cricketer (1935–2002)

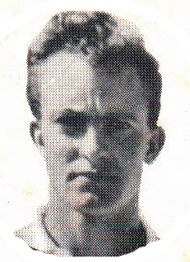
- Halse in 1963

Personal information
- Full name: Clive Gray Halse
- Born: 28 February 1935; Empangeni, Natal, South Africa
- Died: 28 May 2002 (aged 67); Sherwood, Durban, KwaZulu-Natal, South Africa
- Batting: Right-handed
- Bowling: Right-arm fast

International information
- National side: South Africa
- Test debut: 10 January 1964 v Australia
- Last Test: 7 February 1964 v Australia

Career statistics
Competition	Test	First-class
Matches	3	35
Runs scored	30	321
Batting average	–	12.83
100s/50s	0/0	0/0
Top score	19*	35*
Balls bowled	587	5,595
Wickets	6	83
Bowling average	43.33	31.30
5 wickets in innings	0	1
10 wickets in match	0	0
Best bowling	3/50	5/49
Catches/stumpings	1/–	17/–
- Source: Cricinfo, 15 November 2022

Clive Gray Halse (28 February 1935 – 28 May 2002) was a South African cricketer who played in three Test matches in 1964.

Halse was a right-arm fast bowler and a right-handed tail-end batsman who made his first-class debut in 1952-53 for Natal aged 17. He played only 16 matches in 10 seasons before establishing himself in 1962-63 when, with the help of a sympathetic employer who let him leave work an hour early every day to practise, he took 19 wickets at 18.26, helping Natal win the Currie Cup, and earning selection for the tour of Australasia the following season.

On the tour, Halse's modest returns in the state matches and the success of the Test opening bowlers Peter Pollock and Joe Partridge with medium-pace support from Trevor Goddard and Eddie Barlow kept him out of the Test side until the Third Test. He took two wickets in that drawn match, then three wickets in the Fourth Test in Adelaide, when he took the match-winning wicket in his best Test figures of 3 for 50 in the second innings. He took one wicket in the Fifth Test, but the selectors returned to the four-man pace attack in the three subsequent Tests in New Zealand. Batting at number 11, he was not dismissed in any of his three Test innings.

Halse took his best first-class figures of 5 for 49 for Natal against Transvaal at the start of the 1964–65 season, was selected for a South African team against The Rest in a Test trial match, hit his highest first-class score of 35 not out against Rhodesia, and took five wickets for a South African Invitation XI against the MCC. But he was not selected for any of the five Tests against England that season, or for the tour of England in 1965, and he retired.
