= Glen Hall (cricketer) =

South African cricketer (1938–1987)

Personal information
- Full name: Glen Gordon Hall
- Born: 24 May 1938; Pretoria, Transvaal, South Africa
- Died: 26 June 1987 (aged 49); Ramsgate, Natal, South Africa
- Batting: Right-handed
- Bowling: Legbreak

International information
- National side: South Africa
- Only Test: 1 January 1965 v England

Domestic team information
- Years: Team
- 1960/61–1964/65: South African Universities
- 1960/61–1967/68: North Eastern Transvaal
- 1961/62–1963/64: Eastern Province

Career statistics
Competition	Test	First-class
Matches	1	32
Runs scored	0	306
Batting average	0.00	7.84
100s/50s	0/0	0/2
Top score	0	63
Balls bowled	186	6,105
Wickets	1	110
Bowling average	94.00	29.66
5 wickets in innings	0	5
10 wickets in match	0	2
Best bowling	1/94	9/122
Catches/stumpings	0/–	12/–
- Source: Cricinfo, 15 November 2022

Glen Gordon Hall (24 May 1938 – 26 June 1987) was a South African cricketer who represented his country in one Test match in 1965.

== Career ==
A "tall leg-spinner, quickish with both googly and top-spinner in his repertoire", Hall had a remarkable start to his first-class career. Playing for South African Universities against Western Province in 1960–61, he took 4 for 24 and 9 for 122. His form in subsequent seasons was less productive, but against the touring MCC in 1964–65 in consecutive matches he took 4 for 113 for South African Universities and 6 for 145 for North Eastern Transvaal, each time for a team that lost by an innings. He was selected for the Third Test shortly afterwards, but took only 1 for 94.

Playing for North Eastern Transvaal in the B Section of the Currie Cup in 1965–66 he took 27 wickets at 26.11, including 7 for 137 and 4 for 95 against Orange Free State at Pretoria. His form fell away in following seasons, and he played no first-class cricket after 1967–68.

As a batsman Hall passed 20 only twice in his career, but each time he made a fifty. His highest score was for Eastern Province against Transvaal in 1961–62, when he hit 63, his side's top score in a match it lost by an innings.

== Personal life ==
Hall graduated in pharmacy from Rhodes University. He married a former Miss South Africa, and they had two sons. After their divorce in the 1980s he became a recluse, and committed suicide in 1987, aged 49.
