= C. D. Patel =

Tanzanian cricketer

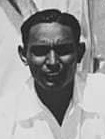
- Patel in the early 1960s

Personal information
- Born: Dodoma, Tanganyika
- Batting: Right-handed
- Bowling: Off spin
- Relatives: R. D. Patel (brother)

Domestic team information
- Years: Team
- 1962–1967: East Africa
- FC debut: 10 February 1962 East Africa v International XI
- Last FC: 19 August 1967 East Africa v India
- Source: CricketArchive, 18 August 2008

C. D. Patel (dates unknown) played cricket for Tanzania between 1956 and 1967 and for Zambia between 1968 and 1972. A right-handed batsman and off spin bowler, he also played first-class cricket for East Africa.

== Career ==
Patel made his international debut in 1956 when he played for Tanzania (then Tanganyika) against Uganda in Dar es Salaam. The following year he played for them against Kenya, Uganda and the MCC. In the match against the MCC, he took the wicket of England international Peter Richardson in both innings. In 1962 he played for East Africa against the touring International XI during their world tour.

He played three times against Uganda in each of the next three years, but after that it would be another seven years before he returned to international cricket. India toured East Africa in 1967 and Patel featured in two matches. First he played in a match for East Africa that was his only first-class match and also played in Tanzania's match against India, during which he took the wicket of Hanumant Singh. This was his last match for Tanzania.

He began to play for Zambia in 1968, playing in the East African Quadrangular tournament in Nairobi, where he captained the team. He played in the tournament again in 1970, scoring a century against Kenya, and in 1971, when the tournament was reduced to a triangular with the absence of Uganda, and where he again captained the team. He last played for Zambia in 1972 when Glamorgan County Cricket Club toured the country. During that tour, he played in two matches for Zambia in addition to a match for a Copperbelt Invitation XI.
