= International Cavaliers =

The International Cavaliers were an ad hoc cricket team based in England, made up of famous cricketers. The team were most active between 1965 and 1970 and included many prominent cricketers from the 1940s, 1950s, 1960s and 1970s as many retired veterans and talented young players were in the team at one point or another.

== History ==
=== Tours ===
International tours were arranged to South Africa in 1960–61, Africa and India in 1962–63 and the West Indies in 1964–65, 1965–66 and 1969–70. These were usually made up of Test players whose countries were not touring that season (a more common occurrence at the time) or who were not required for their Test side.

=== Televised matches ===
In England, from 1965 to 1968 Denis Compton and Godfrey Evans arranged 40-over one-day games for the International Cavaliers made up of international and local players against county teams on Sundays, which at the time were always rest days in Test matches and the County Championship.

The matches were shown in the United Kingdom on BBC Two with (Brian Moore (commentator) presented the first match before Frank Bough took over) showed the games on television, providing extra revenue, and the games allowed spectators to see a wide range of famous players at county grounds. In the first season they drew 280,000 spectators, compared to 327,000 on the other six days of the week. Ted Dexter wrote, "We had such an amazing side – Sobers, Compton, Graeme Pollock – I was only able to creep in at 6 or 7. When we went to Lord's for the first time we told them to be ready, there'd be a big crowd. They said 'No, no, there won't'. They sold out of everything by twelve. We took the place by storm."

In 1966 they beat the touring West Indies cricket team by 21 runs, with Compton making 43 and Trevor Bailey taking 3/41, and again by 7 wickets, with Dexter taking 2/42 and making 104, and in 1969 they defeated New Zealand by 38 runs. They also played various other teams, such as the Rest of the World XI, Duke of Norfolk's XI, F.S Trueman's XI, E.R. Dexter's XI and Oxford University Past and Present.

They were a financial success and their popularity with the fans led to the increase of limited overs cricket in England. As a result the MCC devised their own limited overs competition, but as the BBC were happy showing the Cavaliers they had to ban county cricketers from playing to get the television rights and a sponsor. After several lawsuits the John Player County League began in 1969, and the Cavaliers were disbanded in 1970.

== Players ==
Famous International Cavaliers Source
Name	Country
Neil Adcock	South Africa
Dennis Amiss	England
Trevor Bailey	England
Eddie Barlow	South Africa
Ken Barrington	England
Richie Benaud	Australia
Geoff Boycott	England
Mike Brearley	England
Basil Butcher	West Indies
B. S. Chandrasekhar	India
Brian Close	England
Denis Compton	England
Bevan Congdon	New Zealand
Colin Cowdrey	England
Mike Denness	England
Ted Dexter	England
John Edrich	England
Godfrey Evans	England
Keith Fletcher	England
Roy Fredericks	West Indies
Lance Gibbs	West Indies
Tom Graveney	England
Tony Greig	England
Charlie Griffith	West Indies
Alvin Corneal	West Indies
Wes Hall	West Indies
John Hampshire	England
Ray Illingworth	England
Rohan Kanhai	West Indies
Alan Knott	England
Jim Laker	England
Denis Lindsay	South Africa
Clive Lloyd	West Indies
Brian Luckhurst	England
Colin McDonald	Australia
Garth McKenzie	Australia
Colin Milburn	England
Hanif Mohammad	Pakistan
Arthur Morris	Australia
Deryck Murray	West Indies
Mushtaq Mohammad	Pakistan
Seymour Nurse	West Indies
Chris Old	England
Norm O'Neill	Australia
The Nawab of Pataudi	India
Pat Pocock	England
Graeme Pollock	South Africa
Peter Pollock	South Africa
John Reid	New Zealand
Barry Richards	South Africa
Lawrence Rowe	West Indies
Saeed Ahmed	Pakistan
Bobby Simpson	Australia
M. J. K. Smith	England
John Snow	England
Gary Sobers	West Indies
Brian Statham	England
Bert Sutcliffe	New Zealand
Bob Taylor	England
Fred Titmus	England
Fred Trueman	England
Frank Tyson	England
Derek Underwood	England
Willie Watson	England
Everton Weekes	West Indies

== See also ==
- World Series Cricket Cavaliers XI
