= Grant Bradburn =

New Zealand cricketer

Personal information
- Full name: Grant Eric Bradburn
- Born: 26 May 1966 (age 60); Hamilton, New Zealand
- Batting: Right-handed
- Bowling: Right-arm offbreak
- Relatives: Wynne Bradburn (father)

International information
- National side: New Zealand (1990–2001)
- Test debut (cap 172): 10 October 1990 v Pakistan
- Last Test: 27 March 2001 v Pakistan
- ODI debut (cap 71): 4 November 1990 v Pakistan
- Last ODI: 25 July 2001 v Sri Lanka

Domestic team information
- Years: Team
- 1985/86–2001/02: Northern Districts

Head coaching information
- Years: Team
- 2014–2018: Scotland
- 2023: Pakistan
- 2024: Glamorgan

Career statistics
Competition	Test	ODI	FC	LA
Matches	7	11	127	138
Runs scored	105	60	4,978	2,289
Batting average	13.12	8.57	27.81	22.00
100s/50s	0/0	0/0	4/30	0/5
Top score	30*	30	148*	80*
Balls bowled	867	385	19,624	5,945
Wickets	6	6	250	101
Bowling average	76.66	53.00	32.69	36.68
5 wickets in innings	0	0	4	0
10 wickets in match	0	0	0	0
Best bowling	3/134	2/18	6/56	4/28
Catches/stumpings	6/–	2/–	122/–	62/–
- Source: Cricinfo, 13 May 2023

Grant Eric Bradburn (born 26 May 1966) is a New Zealand cricket coach and former international cricketer.

Bradburn was born at Hamilton in 1966. A tall right-arm off-spin bowler and lower-order batsman, Bradburn played seven Test matches and 11 One Day Internationals between 1990 and 2001. He also played domestically for Northern Districts for 16 seasons.

After retiring from playing, Bradburn coached Northern Districts and the New Zealand Under-19s. In April 2014, he was appointed head coach of Scotland.

He was the fielding coach of the Pakistan national cricket team from 2018 to 2021 and served as the head of High Performance Coaching at the National Cricket Academy in Lahore. He was the head coach of the Pakistan national cricket team from May 2023 until November 2023. Bradburn was head coach of Glamorgan County Cricket Club from January 2024 to December 2024.

== Playing career ==
Domestically Bradburn played for Northern Districts for 16 seasons. He was a tall Off Spinner who also batted in a number of positions. Bradburn's most successful season came in 1989/90 season batting at number four, promoting a debut call up to the national side to tour Pakistan in 1990.

When bowling in a match against Central Districts in 1997, he deliberately bowled a wide down the legside that beat the wicketkeeper and went for four runs ending the game denying the batsman, Mathew Sinclair, a century leaving him on 99 not out. The Central Districts team felt that this was very unsporting of Bradburn, who was subsequently fined $100 for the incident.

Bradburns international career seemed over when he was left out of the New Zealand side after the 1992/93 series in Sri Lanka, but he was recalled in 2000/01 at the age of 35. In all, he played seven Tests and 11 One-Day Internationals and ended his career as the player with most appearances for Northern Districts, playing 115 matches and scoring 4,614 runs at an average of 27.96.

== Coaching career ==
After retirement he ran a family sports store along with coaching Northern Districts A. When Andy Moles was appointed the New Zealand coach in 2008, Bradburn filled the spot left by him as Northern Districts coach for the rest of the season. He was also head coach of New Zealand A and the Under-19 side.

In April 2014, Bradburn was named as Scotland's new head coach. Bradburn's appointment was until the end of 2017 and was extended until the end of 2018. In June 2018, Bradburn coached Scotland to an historic first victory against England in a high scoring ODI at The Grange in Edinburgh.

In September 2018, Bradburn was named as Pakistan's new fielding coach for three years ahead of the 2018 Asia Cup. He resigned in October 2021, citing family reasons and pursuit of "further coaching opportunities". In May 2023, Bradburn was appointed as the head coach of the Pakistan cricket team on a two-year deal.

Bradburn was appointed as head coach at Glamorgan County Cricket Club on a three-year contract in January 2024. He was sacked on 30 December 2024, after being charged with misconduct by the independent cricket regulator following allegations of inappropriate behaviour.

== Personal life ==
Bradburn's father Wynne also played for Northern Districts and represented New Zealand in two Test matches.
