= Harold Cassie =

New Zealand cricket umpire

Personal information
- Full name: Harold Binnie Cassie
- Born: 9 December 1918
- Died: 26 September 1978 (aged 59); Dunedin, New Zealand

Umpiring information
- Tests umpired: 1 (1964)
- Source: Cricinfo, 2 July 2013

Harold Binnie Cassie (9 December 1918 – 26 September 1978) was a New Zealand cricket umpire. He stood in one Test match, New Zealand vs. South Africa, in 1964.

== See also ==
- List of Test cricket umpires
- South African cricket team in New Zealand in 1963–64
