= R. D. Patel (cricketer) =

Tanzanian cricketer

RD Patel
- Patel in the early 1960s

Personal information
- Born: Tanganyika
- Batting: Right-handed
- Role: Wicket-keeper
- Relatives: C. D. Patel (brother)

Domestic team information
- Years: Team
- 1963: East African Invitation XI
- 1964: Coast Cricket Association XI
- 1967: East Africa
- FC debut: 2 November 1963 East African Invitation XI v MCC
- Last FC: 19 August 1967 East Africa v India

Career statistics
Competition	First-class
Matches	3
Runs scored	138
Batting average	23.00
100s/50s	0/1
Top score	58
Catches/stumpings	5/0
- Source: CricketArchive, 18 August 2008

RD Patel (dates unknown) played cricket for Tanganyika/Tanzania between 1957 and 1968, and also played three first-class matches in the 1960s.

== Career ==
A right-handed batsman and wicket-keeper, he made his debut for Tanzania (then Tanganyika) against Kenya in July 1957. That year he also played for East Africa against Sunder Cricket Club and for Tanganyika against Uganda and the MCC. In the match against Uganda he scored 138 opening the batting.

In 1958 he played for East Africa against a South African Non-Europeans team captained by Basil D'Oliveira and for Tanganyika against Uganda, playing in the same match again in 1959 and 1960.

He made his first-class debut in 1963 when he played for an East African Invitation XI against the MCC in Kampala. He played a second first-class match the following year when he captained a Coast Cricket Association XI against Pakistan International Airlines in Mombasa. His final first-class match was for East Africa against India in 1967. He scored 58 in the second innings, his highest score in first-class cricket.

Shortly before his final first-class match he had played for Tanzania against India, and would last play for them in the East African Quadrangular tournament in Nairobi in 1968. Four years later, he played for a Copperbelt Invitation XI against Glamorgan in Chingola, Zambia.
