= Ek Park =

Cricket ground in Kitwe, Zambia

Coordinates: 12°49′46.35″S 28°12′31.90″E

- Interactive map of Ek Park
- Location: Kitwe, Zambia
- Country: Zambia
- Establishment: 1957 (first recorded match)
- As of 8 October 2011; Source: Ground profile

Ek Park is a cricket ground in Kitwe, Zambia. The first recorded match on the ground came in 1957 when Northern Rhodesia played the touring Australians.

The ground later held its first first-class match in 1962 when Rhodesia played a touring International XI, resulting in a drawn match. The second first-class match held on the ground came later in 1962 when Rhodesia played the touring Commonwealth XI, with the match again ending in a draw. During this time, what is today Zambia was administered as part of Northern Rhodesia. These two matches mark the only time first-class cricket has been played anywhere in what is today Zambia.

Following independence the ground has been used by the Zambia national cricket team, who played county opponents in the form of Gloucestershire, Glamorgan and Warwickshire at the ground in the 1970s, though the matches held no official status. Today, the ground is used by Nkana Cricket Club.
