= Donald Burns =

New Zealand cricket umpire

Personal information
- Full name: Donald Christopher Burns
- Born: 14 August 1921; Dunedin, New Zealand
- Died: 20 February 1987 (aged 65); Dunedin, New Zealand

Umpiring information
- Tests umpired: 1 (1964)
- Source: Cricinfo, 2 July 2013

Donald Burns (14 August 1921 – 20 February 1987) was a New Zealand cricket umpire. He stood in one Test match, New Zealand vs. South Africa, in 1964.

== See also ==
- List of Test cricket umpires
- South African cricket team in New Zealand in 1963–64
