= Ian Thomson (cricketer) =

English cricketer (1929–2021)

Personal information
- Full name: Norman Ian Thomson
- Born: 23 January 1929; Walsall, Staffordshire, England
- Died: 1 August 2021 (aged 92); Henfield, West Sussex, England
- Batting: Right-handed
- Bowling: Right-arm medium

International information
- National side: England (1964-1965)
- Test debut: 4 December 1964 v South Africa
- Last Test: 12 February 1965 v South Africa

Career statistics
Competition	Tests	First-class
Matches	5	425
Runs scored	69	7,120
Batting average	23.00	14.74
100s/50s	0/0	0/13
Top score	39	77
Balls bowled	1,488	88,662
Wickets	9	1,597
Bowling average	63.11	20.58
5 wickets in innings	0	73
10 wickets in match	0	8
Best bowling	2/55	10/49
Catches/stumpings	3/–	135/–
- Source: ESPNCricinfo, 31 January 2021

Norman Ian Thomson (23 January 1929 – 1 August 2021) was an English cricketer who played in five Tests for England in 1964 and 1965. Thomson was weeks away from his 36th birthday when he was first selected for Test duties, a recognition of his performances in county cricket.

== Life and career ==
Born 23 January 1929 in Walsall, Staffordshire, Thomson grew up in Essex. After he finished his National Service, his family moved to Sussex, where he joined the county team, playing his first match in 1952. A medium-fast right-arm swing and seam bowler of accuracy and consistency, and a lower-order batsman, he soon became a regular member of the team. He took more than 100 wickets in every season from 1953 to 1964. The later part of Thomson's career coincided with the first one-day competition. He picked up the man of the match award in the 1964 Gillette Cup final, when Sussex beat Warwickshire.

He was picked for the 1964–65 Marylebone Cricket Club (MCC) tour to South Africa, which was led by the Warwickshire captain, M. J. K. Smith. He played in all five Tests on the tour, and was used largely as a stock bowler, with the spinners Fred Titmus and David Allen taking most wickets. A spate of injuries on the tour led to a call-up for Ken Palmer, who was coaching locally, and Geoffrey Boycott was also used as a bowler. Thomson took nine wickets in the five Tests, only four more than Boycott. This was not Thomson's only overseas experience with MCC. In 1955–56 he had toured Pakistan with the side led by Donald Carr, which played only "unofficial" Tests: in fact, he appeared in none of these matches, and played only four matches on the tour.

Thomson retired after the 1965 English season, though he reappeared in two matches in 1972, when Sussex had an injury crisis. In 1961, he scored 780 runs in the season at an average of more than 20, and in several other years he contributed more than 500 runs.

In January 2021, following the death of Donald Smith, Thomson became England's oldest living Test cricketer.

Thomson died at his home in Henfield, West Sussex, on 1 August 2021, aged 92.
