= Donald Smith (cricketer, born 1923) =

English cricketer (1923–2021)

Personal information
- Full name: Donald Victor Smith
- Born: 14 June 1923; Broadwater, Sussex, England
- Died: 10 January 2021 (aged 97); Adelaide, Australia
- Batting: Left-handed
- Bowling: Left-arm medium-pace

International information
- National side: England

Career statistics
Competition	Tests	First-class
Matches	3	377
Runs scored	25	16,960
Batting average	8.33	30.33
100s/50s	–/–	19/88
Top score	16*	206*
Balls bowled	270	22,233
Wickets	1	340
Bowling average	97.00	28.44
5 wickets in innings	–	6
10 wickets in match	–	1
Best bowling	1/12	7/40
Catches/stumpings	–/–	234/–
- Source: Cricinfo

Donald Victor Smith (14 June 1923 – 10 January 2021) was an English cricketer, who played in three Tests for England in 1957. He was born in Broadwater, Sussex, England. The cricket writer, Colin Bateman, commented that "Sri Lanka's historic first victory over England early in 1993 will have given at least one English Test player a certain amount of satisfaction. Don Smith, a steady left-handed opener capable of some useful seam bowling, became Sri Lanka's national coach in the late 1980s".

== Life and career ==
A left-handed all-rounder who played for Sussex as a batsman and, later in his career, as a medium pacer, he scored over 1,500 runs in 1950 to establish himself in their first team. Equally adept at opening the batting, or scoring runs in the middle order as required, Smith's bowling blossomed at the age of 32 when he took 73 wickets, and more good form in 1957, saw him selected for England against the West Indies. Although he found little success in his three Tests against them (amassing 25 runs in four innings), he did score 147 for his county against the tourists, and finished the 1957 season with 2088 runs and five centuries.

After retiring from playing cricket in 1962, Smith became the coach and groundsman at Lancing College, before coaching Sri Lanka in their early days of Test cricket. He emigrated to Australia in 1986 to live in Adelaide. In Adelaide, he was coach of the Ingle Farm District Cricket Club for around 18 months, commencing in the 1985/86 season. On the death of Reg Simpson in November 2013, he became the oldest living English Test cricketer.

Smith died in January 2021 at the age of 97. Following his death, Ian Thomson became England's oldest living Test cricketer.
