= Derek Varnals =

South African cricketer (1935–2019)

Personal information
- Full name: George Derek Varnals
- Born: 24 July 1935; Durban, Natal, South Africa
- Died: 9 September 2019 (aged 84); St Leonards, Sydney, Australia
- Batting: Right-handed
- Bowling: Right-arm

International information
- National side: South Africa
- Test debut: 4 December 1964 v England
- Last Test: 1 January 1965 v England

Career statistics
Competition	Test	First-class
Matches	3	49
Runs scored	97	2,628
Batting average	16.16	30.20
100s/50s	0/0	4/15
Top score	23	151*
Balls bowled	12	12
Wickets	0	0
Bowling average	–	–
5 wickets in innings	–	–
10 wickets in match	–	–
Best bowling	–	–
Catches/stumpings	0/–	15/–
- Source: Cricinfo, 16 April 2021

George Derek Varnals (24 July 1935 – 9 September 2019) was a South African cricketer who played in three Test matches in the 1964–65 season.

The South African cricket commentator Charles Fortune described him as "a compact and correct player with a good range of shots that came more of timing than of power". A right-handed batsman, Varnals played South African domestic first-class cricket, for Eastern Province, Transvaal and Natal, between 1955 and 1965. Apart from the 1957–58 season, when he averaged more than 50 runs per innings and made his highest score – 151 not out in Eastern Province's total of 267, when he opened the innings against Border and carried his bat – his record was relatively modest until 1964–65.

Three centuries in the first half of the 1964–65 season, including one for Natal against the touring MCC team, propelled Varnals into the South African cricket team for the first three Tests against England. He batted a long way down the order and, although he showed useful adhesion in helping to avert defeat in the second match, his highest score in six innings was only 23. When he was dropped after the third match, he retired from first-class cricket. His only first-class bowling was in the final overs of his final Test match.

Varnals later moved to Australia to be closer to his children. He died in Sydney in September 2019.
