= Ramanbhai Patel (cricketer) =

Kenyan cricketer

Personal information
- Full name: Ramanbhai Patel
- Born: 1925; Kenya Colony
- Died: Unknown
- Batting: Unknown

Career statistics
Competition	First-class
Matches	3
Runs scored	29
Batting average	7.25
100s/50s	–/–
Top score	14
Catches/stumpings	2/–
- Source: Cricinfo, 21 September 2021

Ramanbhai Patel (1925 – date of death unknown) was a Kenyan first-class cricketer.

One of Kenya's top batsman throughout the 1950s and 1960s, Patel made his debut in first-class cricket for an International XI against an East Pakistan Governor's XI on the East Pakistan leg of their 1961–62 world tour at Dhaka. He made a further two appearances in first-class cricket, appearing for an East African Invitation XI against a touring Marylebone Cricket Club side at Kampala in 1963, followed by an appearance for the Coast Cricket Association against a touring Pakistan International Airlines team in 1964. In three first-class matches, Patel scored 29 runs with a highest score of 14.
