= Doug Ford (cricketer) =

Australian cricketer (1928–2019)

Personal information
- Full name: Douglas Allan Ford
- Born: 16 December 1928; Maryville, New South Wales, Australia
- Died: 30 June 2019 (aged 90)
- Source: ESPNcricinfo, 28 December 2016

Douglas Allan Ford (16 December 1928 – 30 June 2019) was an Australian cricketer. He played 65 first-class matches for New South Wales between 1957/58 and 1963/64.

== See also ==
- List of New South Wales representative cricketers
