= Leslie Baxter (umpire) =

South African cricket umpire (1916–2002)

Personal information
- Born: 17 November 1916
- Died: 10 November 2002 (aged 85)
- Role: Umpire

Umpiring information
- Tests umpired: 4 (1964–1966)
- Source: Cricinfo, 7 June 2019

Leslie Baxter (17 November 1916 – 10 November 2002) was a South African cricket umpire. Making his Test umpiring debut in 1964, he stood in four Test matches, the last of which was in 1966.

== See also ==
- List of Test cricket umpires
