= Peter van der Merwe (cricketer) =

South African cricketer (1937–2013)

- Peter van der Merwe after the Fifth Test in 1966–67

Personal information
- Full name: Peter Laurence van der Merwe
- Born: 14 March 1937; Paarl, Cape Province, South Africa
- Died: 23 January 2013 (aged 75); Port Elizabeth, Eastern Cape, South Africa
- Batting: Right-handed
- Bowling: Slow left-arm orthodox
- Role: All-rounder
- Relatives: JHB Waite (brother-in-law)

International information
- National side: South Africa
- Test debut (cap 220): 6 December 1963 v Australia
- Last Test: 24 February 1967 v Australia

Domestic team information
- Years: Team
- 1957–1958: South African Universities
- 1958–1966: Western Province
- 1966–1969: Eastern Province

Career statistics
Competition	Test	FC
Matches	15	94
Runs scored	533	4,086
Batting average	25.38	29.18
100s/50s	0/3	4/23
Top score	76	128
Balls bowled	79	6,221
Wickets	1	82
Bowling average	22.00	25.70
5 wickets in innings	0	3
10 wickets in match	0	0
Best bowling	1/6	6/40
Catches/stumpings	11/-	73/-
- Source: CricketArchive, 23 January 2013

Peter Laurence van der Merwe (14 March 1937 – 23 January 2013) was a South African cricketer. He played in fifteen Tests from 1963 to 1967, captaining South Africa to series victories against England in 1965 and Australia in 1966–67.

== Life and career ==
Peter van der Merwe was born in Paarl, Cape Province, and educated at St Andrew's College in Grahamstown and at the University of Cape Town. He began playing first-class cricket as a left-arm spinner for South African Universities, and was the principal spinner in the South African Fezela XI that toured England in 1961. He batted right-handed. As his batting improved, his bowling declined, and he did not bowl at all in first-class cricket after the tour to Australasia in 1963–64. In 1960 he helped raise money to enable Basil D'Oliveira to travel to England to play professional cricket, by organising a team of white players to play a match against a team of non-whites captained by D'Oliveira.

Van der Merwe played for Western Province from 1958–59 to 1965–66, then for Eastern Province from 1966–67 to 1968–69, captaining each team. His leadership qualities led to several appointments above more experienced players and more successful batsmen: he first captained Western Province at the age of 23; he was selected as vice-captain of the touring team to Australasia in 1963–64 at 26 despite having never played a Test; he captained the team to England in 1965 having played only 7 Tests and making only 198 runs at an average of 24.75. The 1965 team won the three-match series 1–0, and although he made only 110 runs in the Tests at 18.33, he was appointed captain for the home series against Australia in 1966–67, when he enjoyed his most successful series as a batsman, batting at number seven or eight and scoring 225 runs at 32.14.

Although his overall Test batting record was modest, van der Merwe played some important innings, none more so than his 76 during a seventh-wicket partnership of 221 in less than three hours with Denis Lindsay in the First Test at Johannesburg in 1966–67. When the two came together South Africa were six wickets down and 223 runs ahead and the match was evenly poised; when the partnership ended, South Africa's lead was virtually unassailable, and they went on to win. In the Third Test of the same series another partnership with Lindsay took South Africa from 94 for 6 in the first innings to 197 for 7; van der Merwe scored 42, and again led South Africa to victory. In the Second Test in 1965 a partnership of 98 with Graeme Pollock rescued South Africa in the first innings from 80 for 5; van der Merwe made 38, and South Africa won the match by 94 runs.

He was also a fine fielder. Wisden's report of the 1965 series ranked him as equal second (with Tiger Lance) in the team after Colin Bland 'for general brilliance in the field'.

He led South Africa in eight Tests, winning four and losing one. The victory over Australia in 1966–67 was South Africa's first series victory against Australia. After the series he retired from Test cricket at the age of 29.

Christopher Martin-Jenkins described van der Merwe as 'a thoughtful and shrewd captain who inspired a zealous team-spirit'. The first player of Afrikaner background to captain South Africa, he wrote the Afrikaans cricket book Wenkrieket So Word Dit Gespeel in 1967. He later became a match referee. Van der Merwe died in Port Elizabeth in January 2013, aged 75, having been in poor health prior to his death.

Preceded by Trevor Goddard	South African Test cricket captain 1965 – 1966/1967	Succeeded by Ali Bacher
