= Denis Lindsay (cricketer) =

South African cricketer (1939–2005)

- Denis Lindsay batting

Personal information
- Full name: Denis Thomson Lindsay
- Born: 4 September 1939; Benoni, Transvaal, South Africa
- Died: 30 November 2005 (aged 66); Johannesburg, Gauteng, South Africa
- Batting: Right-handed
- Role: Wicketkeeper-batsman
- Relatives: Johnny Lindsay (father); Neville Lindsay (great-uncle)

International information
- National side: South Africa
- Test debut (cap 215): 6 December 1963 v Australia
- Last Test: 5 March 1970 v Australia

Career statistics
Competition	Test	FC	LA
Matches	19	124	6
Runs scored	1,130	7,074	160
Batting average	37.66	35.54	40.00
100s/50s	3/5	12/29	0/2
Top score	182	216	57
Balls bowled	–	17	–
Wickets	–	0	–
Bowling average	–	–	–
5 wickets in innings	–	–	–
10 wickets in match	–	–	–
Best bowling	–	–	–
Catches/stumpings	57/2	292/41	3/0
- Source: Cricinfo, 10 December 2013

Denis Thomson Lindsay (4 September 1939 – 30 November 2005) was a South African cricketer who played 19 Test matches for South Africa between 1963 and 1970. His outstanding series was against Australia in 1966–67, when he scored 606 runs in seven innings, including three centuries, took 24 catches as wicketkeeper and conceded only six byes.

Of all wicketkeepers in Test history with a career of 10 Tests or more, Lindsay has the lowest number of byes per Test, with 20 byes conceded in the 15 Tests in which he kept wickets; the best keepers generally average around 3 or 4 byes per Test.

He later became an international cricket referee.

During his career, Lindsay was usually erroneously listed as 'J.D. Lindsay', the same as his father, Johnny, who played three Tests for South Africa in 1947.

== Early career ==
Denis Lindsay made his first-class debut at the age of 19 for North-Eastern Transvaal in the "B" Section of the Currie Cup in the 1958–59 season. Playing against Orange Free State at Benoni he batted at number five and kept wickets, hitting his team's highest score, 43, in a narrow defeat in a low-scoring match. He immediately became a fixture in his provincial side. He hit his first century, 116, against Orange Free State the next season.

In 1961 he was selected with 12 other promising young players to tour England as the South African Fezela XI under the captaincy of Roy McLean. In the first of the three first-class matches, against Essex, he hit five sixes in successive balls off the leg-spinner Bill Greensmith to win the match.

After solid performances with the bat and behind the stumps for North-Eastern Transvaal, Lindsay was selected to tour Australia and New Zealand in 1963–64. Against South Australia in one of the early matches he scored 104 batting at number nine, adding 108 in 75 minutes with Kelly Seymour, and taking the score from 192 for 7 to 375, when he was last out.

== Test career ==
Lindsay played his first Test four weeks later, batting as a specialist batsman at number five (John Waite kept wicket) and making 17 in his only innings. He missed the next two Tests, but returned for the Fourth Test in Adelaide, keeping wicket for the first time. In South Africa's only Test victory on the tour, he scored 41 in his only innings, took four catches, and conceded only one bye. Wally Grout described Lindsay's catch to dismiss Barry Shepherd as "one of the best catches I have ever seen by a wicket-keeper"; Lindsay "turned and sprinted at least 20 yards towards the boundary before diving to catch a ball that went high enough to bring rain".

Waite returned to keep wickets in the Fifth Test, but Lindsay stayed in the side, scoring 65 and putting on 118 for the sixth wicket with Colin Bland. He played as a batsman in all three Tests against New Zealand, but made only 86 runs at an average of 17.20.

At the start of the 1964–65 season he was selected for a South African team against The Rest in a trial match for the forthcoming Test series against the visiting English team. Batting at number six he hit 107 not out, and put on an unbroken partnership of 267 for the fifth wicket with Bland. He was selected to keep wicket for the first three Tests. He top-scored in the first innings of the First Test with 38, and kept through an English innings of 531 in the Second Test without conceding a bye, but he had not made the quick runs South Africa needed, and after the Third Test he was dropped in favour of Waite.

He toured England in 1965 and played in all three Tests. He made the team's first century of the tour, 105 in three hours against Yorkshire batting at number three. He stayed at three for the First Test, making 40 and 22, taking three catches and conceding one bye. He took four catches and a stumping and conceded one bye again when South Africa won the Second Test, though he scored only 0 and 9. Asked to open the batting in the Third Test in an attempt to find a partner for Eddie Barlow, he made only 4 and 17 and made only one stumping, but conceded no byes. Commenting on the series overall, Wisden said he "shone behind the stumps".

He made 425 runs at 47.22 in 1965–66 with three 50s, helping North-Eastern Transvaal to victory in the "B" Section of the Currie Cup, and kept wicket for North in the North v South trial match at the end of the season.

== The 1966–67 series, South Africa v Australia ==
=== Before the Tests ===
Since 1902–03, when the two sides first met in a Test series, Australia had toured South Africa five times and had never lost a match in 21 Tests. In 1966–67 the South Africans believed they had a good chance of their first success.

Lindsay was not considered a certainty to play, as Dennis Gamsy, who had toured England in 1965 without playing a Test, had been in excellent form behind the stumps for Natal, and Lindsay's Test batting record at this stage was a moderate 415 runs at 21.84 in 12 Tests. But in the first match of the domestic season Lindsay hit 216 for North-Eastern Transvaal against Transvaal 'B', and was subsequently selected in a South African XI to play the touring Australian side in a four-day match three weeks before the First Test. In this important game Lindsay hit 30 and 68 to help the home team to an easy victory and raise the South Africans' confidence leading into the Test series.

=== The five Test matches ===
In the First Test in Johannesburg, Peter van der Merwe won the toss and batted, but South Africa quickly lost five wickets for 41 before Lindsay came in. He scored 69 off 101 balls, adding 110 for the sixth wicket with Tiger Lance. Nevertheless, South Africa was all out for 199. Australia then made 325, Lindsay taking six catches, equalling the Test record. In the second innings South Africa was more successful, but at 268 for 5 the lead was only 142. Lindsay added 81 with Lance, then 221 with van der Merwe; aided by numerous dropped catches, he hit 182 off 227 balls with 25 fours and five sixes. The final total of 620 was South Africa's highest score in Tests. Lindsay then took two more catches as Australia was dismissed for 261 and defeated by 233 runs. Lindsay did not concede a single bye in the match. He became the first wicketkeeper to score a century and make five dismissals in an innings in the same Test.

The Second Test in Cape Town followed immediately. Australia made 542, and in South Africa's reply of 353 Lindsay made only 5; he was caught (and had to be carried from the field) when the ball ricocheted from his bat to his forehead and back to the bowler, David Renneberg. Following on, South Africa lost four wickets for 60 before Lindsay, with his head bandaged, made 81 off 134 balls, adding 119 with Lance to help the team reach 367. Australia then made 160 for 4 to win by six wickets and level the series. Lindsay took three catches in the match and conceded only two byes.

The Third Test in Durban three weeks later began with another South African collapse. Six wickets fell for 94 before Lindsay, who made 137, put on 103 for the seventh wicket with van der Merwe, and 89 for the eighth wicket with David Pithey, taking South Africa to a total of 300. Lindsay then took three catches in each innings as Australia made 147 and 334, and South Africa hit the winning runs for the loss of only two wickets. No other batsman scored a century in the match.

Lindsay was also the only batsman to score a century in the Fourth Test in Johannesburg, when rain saved Australia from almost certain defeat. Batting first, Australia was dismissed for 143. Coming in at 120 for 4, Lindsay reached 50 in 48 minutes and 100 an hour later. According to the match report in Wisden, he "hooked and drove all the bowlers with consummate ease". Nobody else in the match hit a six, yet Lindsay hit four of them, bringing up his century with one. After Lindsay's 131 (made out of the 179 runs South Africa scored while he was at the wicket) the next highest score in the match was 47 by Trevor Goddard, the South African opener. South Africa declared at 322 for 9 and reduced Australia to 148 for 8, still 31 runs in arrears, before rain ended the match. Lindsay took three catches in the match and conceded no byes.

With the series still in the balance in the Fifth Test in Port Elizabeth, Australia was sent in by van der Merwe and dismissed for 173, Lindsay taking two catches. Lindsay made only 1 when South Africa replied with 276, then took two more catches to help dismiss Australia for 278. He was not needed to bat in the second innings, when South Africa made 179 for 3 to win the match and the series. Once again Lindsay conceded no byes in the match.

=== Lindsay's records ===
Lindsay's 606 runs in the series remains the record for a wicketkeeper. Accurate figures for his overall run-rate are unavailable, but according to R.S. Whitington, at the end of the second day of the Fourth Test Lindsay had made 585 runs in the series off 816 balls, which is a rate of 71 runs per 100 balls, so it is reasonable to assume that his final rate for the series was at least 70. Overall series run-rates for the two sides were 47 per 100 balls for South Africa (43 per 100 apart from Lindsay), 40 per 100 balls for Australia; his scoring rate was therefore 50 per cent higher than the series average.

His 24 dismissals was the equal second-highest total at the time (equal with Deryck Murray, and behind John Waite on 26). Records for fewest byes conceded in a series are hard to come by, but Lindsay's total of only six byes in the five Tests may well be a record. For comparison:

- in his four Tests in the 1948 series, Don Tallon conceded 64 byes, while Godfrey Evans conceded 58 in five Tests
- in the 1956–57 series in South Africa, Evans conceded 14 byes, and John Waite 44
- in the 1957–58 series in South Africa, Wally Grout conceded 30 byes, and Waite 33
- in his record-setting series in 1961–62, Waite conceded nine byes in five Tests
- when Budhi Kunderan scored 525 runs against England in 1963–64, the previous record for a wicketkeeper, he conceded 79 byes
- in the five-Test series, England v West Indies in 1966, the keepers conceded 75 altogether
- in the 1966–67 series, Brian Taber, the Australian keeper, conceded 27 (although only four in the last three Tests)
- in the six-Test series in 1970–71, Alan Knott conceded 44 byes, and Rod Marsh also conceded 44
- when Marsh set the current Test record of 28 dismissals in a series in 1982–83, he conceded 37 byes in five Tests
- when Andy Flower made 540 runs in a two-Test series in 2000–01, he conceded 11 byes
- in his most productive series with the bat (473 runs in three Tests in 2001–02) Adam Gilchrist conceded 16 byes

Lindsay also conceded only four byes in his three matches in the 1964–65 series, two byes in the three Tests in 1965, and none in his two Tests in 1969–70. So altogether in his last 13 Tests he conceded only 12 byes (the opposition keepers in those 13 Tests conceded 63 byes) and none at all in his last four Tests.

== Fiction ==
In Shehan Karunatilaka's cricket novel Chinaman, in which real people and facts mingle with fiction, the narrator, W.G. Karunasena, defends the selection of Lindsay in a World XI of all time:

I saw Lindsay tour Sri Lanka as part of a Commonwealth side in the 1960s and keep wickets to the fire of Wes Hall and Freddie Trueman and the wiles of Chandrasekhar and Prasanna. I have never seen that level of agility in anyone outside of a cartoon film ... Maara [great] reflexes. Jonty Rhodes is nowhere. He [Lindsay] jumped in front of the batsman to take a catch at silly mid-off.

In fact Lindsay never played in Asia or for a Commonwealth team.
