= Richie Benaud =

Australian cricketer and commentator (1930–2015)

Richie Benaud OBE
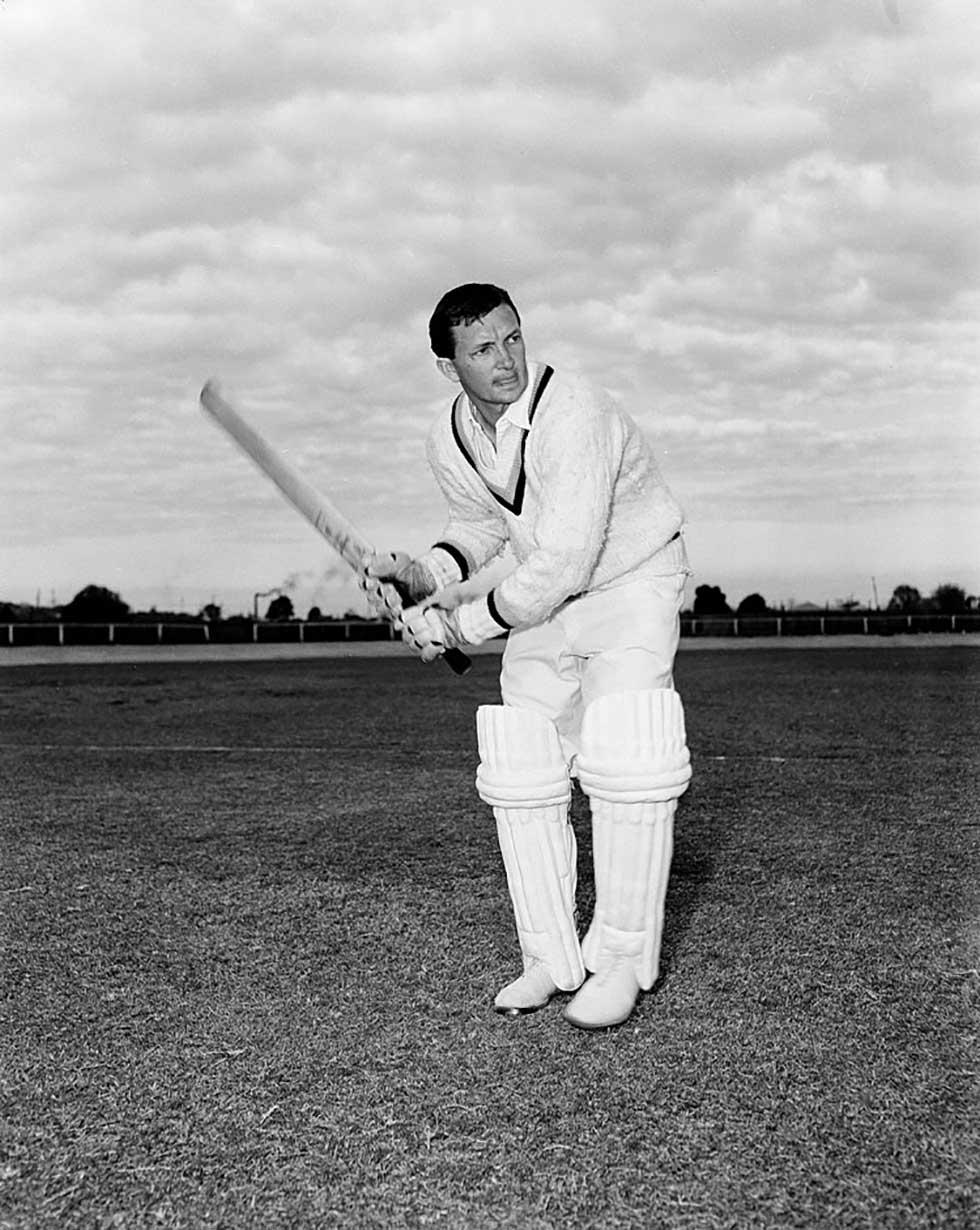
- Benaud in 1959

Personal information
- Full name: Richard Benaud
- Born: 6 October 1930; Penrith, New South Wales, Australia
- Died: 10 April 2015 (aged 84); Sydney, New South Wales, Australia
- Batting: Right-handed
- Bowling: Right-arm leg spin
- Role: All-rounder
- Relatives: John Benaud (brother); Marcia Lavender (m. 1953-1967); 2s Daphne Surfleet (m. 1967-2015)

International information
- National side: Australia
- Test debut (cap 190): 25 January 1952 v West Indies
- Last Test: 12 February 1964 v South Africa

Domestic team information
- Years: Team
- 1948–1964: New South Wales

Career statistics
| Competition | Test | First-class |
|---|---|---|
| Matches | 63 | 259 |
| Runs scored | 2,201 | 11,719 |
| Batting average | 24.45 | 36.50 |
| 100s/50s | 3/9 | 23/61 |
| Top score | 122 | 187 |
| Balls bowled | 19,108 | 60,481 |
| Wickets | 248 | 945 |
| Bowling average | 27.03 | 24.73 |
| 5 wickets in innings | 16 | 56 |
| 10 wickets in match | 1 | 9 |
| Best bowling | 7/72 | 7/18 |
| Catches/stumpings | 65/– | 254/– |
- Source: ESPNcricinfo, 22 December 2007

Richard Benaud (/ˈbɛnoʊ/; 6 October 1930 – 10 April 2015) was an Australian cricketer who played for New South Wales and Australia. Following his retirement from international cricket in 1964, Benaud became a highly regarded commentator on the game.

Benaud was a Test cricket all-rounder, blending leg spin bowling with lower-order batting aggression. Along with fellow bowling all-rounder Alan Davidson, he helped restore Australia to the top of world cricket in the late 1950s and early 1960s after a slump in the early 1950s. In 1958, he became Australia's Test captain until his retirement in 1964. He became the first player to reach 200 wickets and 2,000 runs in Test cricket, reaching the milestone in 1963.

Gideon Haigh described him as "perhaps the most influential cricketer and cricket personality since the Second World War". In his review of Benaud's autobiography Anything But, Sri Lankan cricket writer Harold de Andrado wrote: "Richie Benaud possibly next to Sir Don Bradman has been one of the greatest cricketing personalities as player, researcher, writer, critic, author, organiser, adviser and student of the game."

== Early years ==
Benaud was born in Penrith, New South Wales, in 1930. He came from a cricket family, with his younger brother John Benaud also going on to become an Australian Test cricketer. His father Louis, a third-generation Australian of French Huguenot descent, was a leg spinner who played for Penrith District Cricket Club in Sydney Grade Cricket, gaining attention for taking all twenty wickets in a match against St. Marys for 65. Lou later moved to Parramatta region in western Sydney, and played for Cumberland. Benaud also used to live in Coraki, NSW.

It was here that Richie Benaud grew up, learning how to bowl leg breaks, googlies and topspinners under his father's watch. Educated at Parramatta High School, Benaud made his first grade debut for Cumberland at age 16, primarily as a batsman.

In November 1948, at the age of 18, Benaud was selected for the New South Wales Colts, the state youth team. He scored 47 not out and took 3/37 in an innings win over Queensland. As a specialist batsman, he made his first-class debut for New South Wales at the Sydney Cricket Ground against Queensland in the New Year's match of the 1948–49 season. On a green pitch which was struck by a downpour on the opening day, Benaud's spin was not used by Arthur Morris, and he failed to make an impression with the bat in his only innings, scoring only two. New South Wales were the dominant state at the time, and vacancies in the team were scarce, particularly as there were no Tests that season and all of the national team players were available for the whole summer.

Relegated to the Second XI after this match, he was struck in the head above the right eye by a ball from Jack Daniel while batting against Victoria in Melbourne, having missed an attempted hook. After 28 X-rays showed nothing, it was finally diagnosed that the crater in his forehead had resulted in a skull fracture and he was sidelined for the remainder of the season, since a second impact could have been fatal. He spent two weeks in hospital for the surgery. This was the only match he played for the second-string state team that summer.

In his early career, Benaud was a batting all-rounder, marked by a looping backlift which made him suspect against fast bowling but allowed him to have a wide attacking stroke range. At the start of the 1949–50 season, he was still in the Second XI, but when the Test players departed for a tour of South Africa soon afterwards, vacancies opened up. Benaud was recalled to the New South Wales First XI in late December for the Christmas and New Year's fixtures. With Ray Lindwall, Keith Miller and Ernie Toshack, three of Australia's leading four bowlers from the 1948 Invincibles tour of England unavailable, Benaud bowled heavily in some matches. However, he did not have much success in his five games, taking only five wickets at 54.00.

He took the wicket of Queensland batsman Bill Brown in his third match of the season. Benaud erroneously recalled in an autobiography that this was his maiden wicket—it was, in fact, his fourth—and described the ball as "the worst I ever bowled". He had more success with the bat, scoring 93 and narrowly missing a century against South Australia. He added another fifty and ended with 250 runs at 31.25.

For the next season, England toured Australia, and with the Test players back, Benaud was initially forced out of the team. He was recalled for a match against the Englishmen. He was attacked by the touring batsmen, taking 1/75 from 16.5 overs in his first outing against an international outfit. His only wicket was that of the all-rounder Trevor Bailey. He scored 20 not out and was not called on to bowl in the second innings.

In the next Shield match against Victoria, led by Australian captain Lindsay Hassett, Benaud came in for attack. Hassett was known for his prowess against spin bowling, being the only batsman to score centuries in a match against the leg-spin of Bill O'Reilly, regarded as the finest bowler of his age. Hassett struck 179 in four hours, and took 47 runs from Benaud's seven overs. The young leg spinner claimed Hassett in the second innings when a ball landed in a crack and skidded through onto his foot. He ended with 3/56, the first time he had taken three wickets in a match.

In the next match against South Australia, he made 48, took 4/93 and 1/29 and suffered three dropped catches by the wicketkeeper in successive balls. Benaud was cementing his position and was in the senior team for four consecutive matches even with the Test players available. He was selected for an Australian XI match against England, in what was effectively a trial for Test selection, but suffered a chipped bone in his thumb. This put him out of action until the last match of the season, leaving him with little opportunity to impress the national selectors for his rise to international cricket. Benaud returned and scored 37 and took a total of 2/68 in the final match, ending the season with 184 runs at 36.80 and 11 wickets at 34.63.

== Early Test career ==
The 1951–52 season saw a tour to Australia by the West Indies. Benaud was given a chance against the visiting team when New South Wales played them in Sydney after the First Test. On a green pitch, Benaud came in at 7/96 and featured in a century partnership in only an hour, making 43 himself. The Caribbeans were skittled for 134 in reply and went on to lose the match, although they attacked the young leg-spinner, who took 1/130 in total from 36 overs. Benaud scored his maiden first-class century, 117 against South Australia, in the next match, two years after falling short of the milestone by seven runs. In the next four matches, Benaud passed 15 only once, scoring a 34, and took only seven wickets. Up to this point, in seven matches for the season, the young all-rounder had only scored 307 runs at 27.90 and taken ten wickets at 64.80.

Despite this, Benaud was chosen for his Test debut in the Fifth Test against the West Indies in 1951–52 in Sydney. At this point, Australia had already taken an unassailable 3–1 series lead and decided to try out some young players. Selected as a batsman, he scored 3 and 19. Hassett allowed him to bowl only in the second innings, when nine West Indian wickets had fallen and Australia were on the verge of an inevitable victory. Leading opposition batsman Everton Weekes edged Benaud in his first over, but Gil Langley dropped the catch. Benaud went on to dismiss tail-ender Alf Valentine for his first Test wicket, conceding 14 runs from 4.3 overs. Benaud ended his season with 97 and a total of 3/39 in an innings win over South Australia.

For the following Australian season in 1952–53, Benaud started modestly; and, in the five first-class matches before the Tests, he scored 208 runs at 26.00, including a 63 and 69, and 14 wickets at 38.64. This included figures of 2/70 and 4/90 against the touring South Africa. However, this was not enough to ensure his selection in the First Test, where he was made 12th man. After scoring 60 and 37 and taking 1/60 in an Australian XI against the South Africans following the Test, he was selected for the Second Test. He suffered a smashed gum and a severely cut top lip when a square cut by John Waite in the Third Test against South Africa at the Sydney Cricket Ground hit him in the face while he was fielding at short gully.

Doctors told him he was lucky: it could have broken his cheekbones, jaw or removed his eyesight if it had hit any of the surrounding areas. It could have killed him if it had struck him where his skull was previously fractured. He married after the match and had to mumble his wedding vows through a swathe of bandages. Benaud went on to play in the final four Tests. He made 124 runs at 20.66, making double figures in four of seven innings, but was unable to capitalise on his starts, with a top score of 45. His leg spin yielded ten wickets at 30.60, with a best of 4/118 in the Fourth Test in Adelaide when he was given a heavy workload, totalling 58 overs, when Ray Lindwall and Keith Miller broke down during the match. In another match for New South Wales against the touring team, he took a total of 5/95.

Up to this point, his first-class batting average was below 30 and his bowling average close to 40, and he had never taken more than four wickets in an innings or six in a match. The selectors persisted in Benaud despite his unproductive Test performances, selecting him for the squad for the 1953 Ashes tour of England. He had been seventh and eighth in the domestic run-scoring and wicket-taking aggregates for the season, but was yet to convert this into international performance. He justified their decision prior to the team's departure, scoring 167 not out and taking match figures of 7/137 for the touring team against a Tasmania Combined XI, his wickets including Test batsmen Miller, Ian Craig and Neil Harvey. He also put on 167 in a partnership with Alan Davidson, the first collaboration between the pair, who would later go on to lead Australia's bowling in the last five years of their career. Benaud struck an unbeaten 100 and totalled 1/64 in the next match against Western Australia before the Australians departed for England.

On arrival in the British Isles, Benaud quickly made an impression with both bat and ball. After scoring 44 and taking 2/66 in the opening first-class match against Worcestershire, the all-rounder starred in his next match, against Yorkshire. He scored 97 in Australia's only innings and then took 7/46 in the hosts' first innings as the Australians took an innings win. Although his form with the willow dropped off in his remaining six matches before the Tests—a 35 was his only score beyond 20 in seven attempts—Benaud continued to strike regularly with the ball. He took 18 wickets in these matches, including 3/20 and 3/37 against Oxford University, 5/13 against Minor Counties and 4/38 against Hampshire. This was enough for him to gain selection for the start of the Tests.

He managed only eight runs in four innings in the first two Tests, and having taken only two wickets for 136 runs was dropped for the Third. This was part of a month-long run in which he made only 123 runs in eight innings and took only seven wickets in four matches. He was recalled immediately for the Fourth Test, but was dropped for the Fifth after managing seven runs in his only innings and going wicketless. He ended the Test series with 15 runs at 3.00 and two wickets at 87.00. It was thought that the surface at the Oval would favour pacemen, but Australia's selection proved to be a blunder as England's spinners took them to the only win of the series, allowing them to regain the Ashes.

He also showed his hitting ability in a tour match against T.N. Pearce's XI at Scarborough. Opening the batting, he struck 135 in 110 minutes in the second innings, including an Australian record of eleven sixes, four of them in one over. In eight first-class matches after his Test campaign was over, Benaud added a further half-century in addition to the century against Pearce's XI, and took 22 more wickets, including 4/20 against the Gentlemen of England.

== Consolidation ==
After returning home from his first overseas tour, Benaud was prolific during the 1953–54 Australian season, which was purely domestic with no touring Test team. He contributed significantly with both bat and ball in New South Wales' Sheffield Shield triumph, the first of nine consecutive titles. In the opening match of the season, he struck 158 and took 5/88 and 1/65 against Queensland. He made another century in the return match, striking 144 not out and taking a total of 2/55. Midway through the season, he played in Morris's XI in a testimonial match for Hassett, who captained the other team. Benaud scored 78 and 68 and took a total of 5/238, his dismissals being Davidson and frontline Test batsmen in a 121-run win. He then finished the summer strongly, and ended the season with 811 runs at 62.38 and 35 wickets at 30.54. Benaud was the only bowler selected for all five Tests of the 1954–55 series when England visited Australia. He secured his place after scoring 125 against Queensland at the start of the season, although his lead-up form in two matches against England for his state and an Australian XI was not encouraging.

At this stage of his career, he had played 13 Tests with mediocre results. Selected as a batsman who could bowl, he had totalled 309 runs at 15.45 without passing 50, and taken 23 wickets at 37.87 with only two four-wicket innings hauls. Even so, he was promoted to vice-captain above several senior players when Ian Johnson and Keith Miller missed the 2nd Test at Sydney through injury and Arthur Morris was made temporary captain. He also made 113 against the touring team for the Prime Minister's XI.

Australia's selectors persisted and selected him for the squad to tour the West Indies in 1954–55. Their faith was rewarded by an improvement in performances. Benaud contributed 46 and match figures of 2/73 in a First Test victory at Kingston. After a draw in the Second Test, he took three wickets in four balls to end with 4/15 in the first innings at Georgetown, Guyana, before scoring 68 (his first Test half century) as Australia moved to a 2–0 series lead. In the Fifth Test at Kingston, he struck a century in 78 minutes, despite taking 15 minutes to score his first run. He ended with 121 and took four wickets in the match as Australia won by an innings and took the series 3–0. Benaud had contributed 246 runs at 41 and taken wickets steadily to total 18 at 26.94.

During the 1956 tour to England, he helped Australia to its only victory in the Lord's Test, when he scored a rapid 97 in the second innings in 143 minutes from only 113 balls. His fielding, in particular at gully and short leg, was consistently of a high standard, in particular his acrobatic catch to dismiss Colin Cowdrey. He was unable to maintain the standards he had set in the West Indies, contributing little apart from the Lord's Test. He ended the series with 200 runs at 25 and eight wickets at 42.5.

Benaud's bowling reached a new level on the return leg of Australia's overseas tour, when they stopped in the Indian subcontinent in 1956–57 en route back to Australia. In a one-off Test against Pakistan in Karachi, he scored 56 and took 1/36 as Australia fell to defeat. He claimed his Test innings best of 7/72 in the first innings of the First Test in Madras, allowing Australia to build a large lead and win by an innings. It was his first five-wicket haul in a Test innings. After taking four wickets in the drawn Second Test in Bombay, Benaud bowled Australia to victory in the Third Test in Calcutta, sealing the series 2–0. He took 6/52 and 5/53, his best-ever match analysis, ending the series with 113 runs at 18.83 and 24 wickets at 17.66.

It was the first of his successes against India, against whom he took his wickets at an average of 18. This put him in a small group of spinners whose career averages were inferior to their performances against India, generally regarded as the best players of spin in the world. At this stage of his career, he had yet to perform consistently with bat and ball simultaneously, apart from his breakthrough series in the Caribbean. He had managed, in the 14 Tests since then, 559 runs at 27.95 and 67 wickets at 24.98.

Benaud took part in Australia's tour of New Zealand from February to March 1957. The tour included seven first-class matches, three of which were unofficial Tests. Benaud was the top wicket-taker on the tour, with 32 wickets at 19.31, and Australia's top wicket-taker in the three matches against New Zealand, with 15 wickets at 21.73. Early in the tour, when the team visited Timaru to pay a minor match, Benaud went to a pharmacy to see if he could get something to soothe his spinning-fingers, which had been torn by his spinning action for many years. The pharmacist, Ivan James, suggested a treatment with calamine lotion and boracic acid. It worked at once, and Benaud used it thereafter. "Meeting Ivan James was a remarkable piece of luck," he wrote later; "walking into that chemist's shop in Timaru saved my bowling career."

== Peak years and captaincy ==
Benaud's Test career batting performance

After a break in the international calendar of a year, the 1957–58 tour to South Africa heralded the start of a phase of three international seasons when Benaud was at his peak. The tour saw his bowling talents come to the fore when he took 106 wickets, surpassing the previous record of 104 by England's Sydney Barnes. He scored 817 runs including four centuries, two of them in Test matches. The first of these came in the First Test at Johannesburg, where after conceding 1/115, Benaud struck 122, his highest Test score, to see Australia reach a draw.

In the Second Test at Cape Town, Benaud took 4/95 and then 5/49 in the second innings to secure an innings victory after the home team were forced to follow on. He followed this with 5/114 in a drawn Third Test, before a match-winning all round performance in the Fourth Test in Johannesburg. Benaud struck exactly 100 in the first innings, before taking 4/70 in South Africa's reply. When South Africa followed on, Benaud took 5/84, which left Australia needing only one run to win. He took 5/82 in the second innings of the Fifth Test, the fourth consecutive match in which he had taken five wickets in an innings, as Australia took a 3–0 series win. He had been a major contributor to the series win, scoring 329 runs at 54.83 and taking 30 wickets at 21.93, establishing himself as one of the leading leg spinners of the modern era.

When Ian Craig fell ill at the start of the 1958–59 season, Benaud was promoted to the captaincy ahead of vice-captain Neil Harvey. Harvey and Benaud had been captains of their respective states until Harvey moved in the same season for employment purposes from Victoria to New South Wales and became Benaud's deputy. Benaud had little prior leadership experience, and faced the task of recovering the Ashes from an England team which had arrived in Australia as favourites. He led from the front with his bowling, taking match figures of 7/112 in his debut as captain as Australia claimed the First Test in Brisbane. Benaud's men won the Second Test, before he took 5/83 and 4/94 in the drawn Third Test. Benaud produced an all-round performance of 46, 5/91 and 4/82 in the Fourth Test in Adelaide to take an unassailable 3–0 series lead and regain the Ashes, before scoring 64 and match figures of 5/57 to help take the Fifth Test and a 4–0 series result. Benaud contributed 132 runs at 26.4 and 31 wickets at the low average of 18.83, as well as his shrewd and innovative captaincy.

Benaud then led Australia on its first full tour of the Indian subcontinent, playing three and five Tests against Pakistan and India respectively. Benaud took 4/69 and 4/42 in the First Test in Dacca (now in Bangladesh), sealing Australia's first win in Pakistan. He took four wickets in a Second Test in Lahore that sealed the series 2–0, the last time Australia would win a Test in Pakistan until Mark Taylor's men in 1998, 37 years later. Six further wickets in the drawn Third Test saw Benaud end the series with 84 runs at 28 and 18 wickets at 21.11. Benaud made a strong start to the series against India, taking 3/0 in the first innings of the First Test in Delhi, before a 5/76-second innings haul secured an innings victory. Benaud had less of an impact on the next two Tests, which Australia lost and drew, totaling 6/244. He returned to form with 5/43 and 3/43 as India were defeated by an innings after being forced to follow on in the Fourth Test in Madras. A further seven wickets from the captain in the Fifth Test saw Australia secure a draw and the series 2–1.

Benaud had contributed 91 runs at 15.16 and 29 wickets at 19.59. The first two seasons of the Benaud captaincy had been a resounding success, with Australia winning eight, drawing four and losing only one Test. Benaud's personal form was a major factor in this success. In the previous seasons when he and his team were at their peak, he had scored 636 runs at 31.8 with taken 108 wickets at 20.27 in eighteen Tests, averaging six wickets a match.

== Later career ==
Benaud took over when Australian cricket was in a low phase with a young team. His instinctive, aggressive captaincy and daring approach to cricket – and his charismatic nature and public relations ability – revitalised cricket interest in Australia. This was exhibited in the 1960–61 Test series against the visiting West Indians, in which the grounds were packed to greater levels than they are today despite Australia's population doubling since then.

The First Test in Brisbane ended in the first tie in Test history, which came about after Benaud and Alan Davidson, rather than settle for a draw, decided to risk defeat and play an attacking partnership, which took Australia to the brink of victory. Australia had fallen to 6/92 on the final day chasing a target of 233 with Benaud and Davidson at the crease. Australia's chances of winning looked remote when they reached tea at 6/109 with 124 runs still required with only the tailenders to follow. Despite this, Benaud told chairman of selectors Don Bradman that he would still be going for an improbable victory in accordance with his policy of aggression. With an attacking partnership, the pair took Australia to within sight of the target.

Both men were noted for their hitting ability and viewed attack as their most effective chance of survival. Regular boundaries and quickly-run singles took the score to 226, a seventh-wicket partnership of 134. Only seven runs were required with four wickets in hand as time was running short. Benaud hit a ball into the covers and the pair attempted a quick single when a direct hit from Joe Solomon saw Davidson run out. Australia needed six runs from the final over, in which Benaud was caught and the last two wickets fell to run outs while attempting the winning run.

The Test was tied when Solomon ran out Ian Meckiff with a direct hit. Benaud had an ineffective match with the ball, taking 1/162. He took 4/107 in a seven-wicket victory in Melbourne, before the West Indies levelled the series with a 22-run win in Sydney. Benaud had a heavy load in the match, taking 8/199 after Davidson tore a hamstring mid-match. In Adelaide, with Davidson absent, Benaud bowled long spells to take match figures of 7/207 in addition to a score of 77 in the first innings. With Davidson back, Australia won the final Test by two wickets, after a controversial incident in which Australian wicketkeeper Wally Grout was not given out hit wicket when a bail was dislodged and the umpires did not notice. Australia won the series 2–1, and although Benaud was below his best, scoring at 21.77 and taking 23 wickets at 33.87, the series was a success for cricket. The unprecedented public interest saw the Caribbean touring party farewelled with a ticker-tape parade by the Australian public. Along with the West Indian captain Frank Worrell, Benaud's bold leadership enlivened interest in Test cricket among a public who had increasingly regarded it as boring.

On his third and final tour to England in 1961, he was hampered by damaged tendons in his right shoulder, which forced him to miss the Second Test at Lord's known as the "Battle of the Ridge". In all he missed a third of the matches due to injury. Despite this impairment to his bowling shoulder, his team played with an aggressive strategy leading them to lose only one Test match and no other matches during the tour, honouring his pre-series pledge. The First Test at Edgbaston was drawn with Benaud taking three wickets. After Harvey led the team to victory at Lord's, Benaud had an unhappy return in the Third at Headingley scoring two runs in two innings and taking match figures of 2/108 as Australia lost within three days. With the series balanced at 1–1, the Fourth Test at Old Trafford initially brought no improvement, with Benaud scoring 2 and taking 0/80 in the first innings. He made 1 in the second before a last-wicket partnership between Davidson and Graham McKenzie of 98 yielded a defendable target.

During England's chase on the final afternoon it became apparent that, with Ted Dexter scoring quickly, Australia would lose the Test unless England were bowled out. Benaud went around the wicket and bowled into the footmarks, having Dexter caught behind and then Peter May bowled around his legs. Benaud's 5/13 in 25 balls instigated an English collapse which saw Australia retain the Ashes. He finished the innings with 6/70. Benaud then took four wickets in the drawn Fifth Test to end the series 2–1. Benaud had a poor series with the bat, scoring 45 runs at 9, but was more successful with the ball, taking 15 wickets at 32.53. He finished the first-class tour with 627 runs and 61 wickets at 23.54. He was appointed an OBE in that year and in 1962 was named as one of the Wisden Cricketers of the Year.

The 1961–62 Australian season was purely a domestic one, with no touring international team. Benaud led New South Wales throughout a dominant season, winning the Sheffield Shield with 64 of the 80 possible points. Benaud was the leading wicket-taker of the season with 47 at 17.97. His aggressive tactical style brought large crowds throughout the season, with almost 18,000 watching one match against South Australia.

In another match against Victoria, he ordered his team to attempt to score 404 on the final day to take an unlikely victory in accordance with a promise to score at 400 per day. At one stage, New South Wales were six wickets down with less than 150 runs scored, but Benaud refused to attempt to defend for a draw. He made 140, in a seventh-wicket partnership of 255 in just 176 minutes, an Australian record that still stands.

In 1962–63 an English team under Dexter visited Australia. Fred Trueman with 216 Test wickets and Brian Statham with 229 were poised to overtake the record of 236 Test wickets set by the assistant-manager Alec Bedser. Benaud was another contender with 219 wickets, but it was Statham who broke the record (only to be overtaken by Trueman in New Zealand) and Benaud had to be content with breaking Ray Lindwall's Australian record of 228 Test wickets. In an early tour match Benaud took his best first class innings haul of 18–10–18–7 for New South Wales against the MCC, which lost by an innings and 80 runs, the state's biggest win against the English team. Benaud started the series with seven wickets and a half century as the First Test in Brisbane was drawn. This was followed by three unproductive Tests which yielded only 5/360 and a win apiece. Benaud returned to form with match figures of 5/142 and 57 in the Fifth Test at Sydney, which ended in a draw when Benaud ordered Bill Lawry and Peter Burge to play out the last afternoon for a draw that would retain the Ashes. They were booed and heckled as they left the field and Benaud's reputation as a "go ahead" cricket captain was badly tarnished. The draw meant that the series was shared 1–1, the first time he had drawn a series after five successive wins. It was another lean series with the ball, Benaud's 17 wickets costing 40.47, the third consecutive series where his wickets cost more than 30. His batting was reliable, with 227 runs at 32.47.

At the start of the 1963–64 season, Benaud announced that it would be his last at first-class level. The first Test of the season, against the touring South Africans, saw high drama as Australia's left arm paceman Ian Meckiff was called for throwing by Colin Egar and removed from the attack by Benaud after one over. Benaud did not bowl Meckiff from the other end, and at the end of the match Meckiff announced his retirement. Benaud took 5/72 and scored 43 in the First Test, but then injured himself in a grade match, so Bob Simpson captained the team for the Second Test and won the match in Benaud's absence.

Upon his return, Benaud advised the Australian Cricket Board that it would be in the better interests of the team if Simpson continued as captain for the remainder of the season. Benaud took 3/116 to complement scores of 43 and 90 on his return in the Third Test in Sydney. His final two Tests saw no fairytale finish, yielding only four wickets and 55 runs. His batting had been steady though with 231 runs at 33, but his bowling was less so, taking 12 wickets at 37.42.

Benaud was awarded life membership by the New South Wales Cricket Association, but he returned it in protest in 1970 when his younger brother John was removed from the captaincy. In 1967–68 he captained a Commonwealth team against Pakistan, playing in his last five first-class fixtures.

During Benaud's captaincy, Australia did not lose a series, and became the dominant team in world cricket. His success was based on his ability to attack, his tactical boldness and his ability to extract more performance from his players, in particular Davidson. He was known for his unbuttoned shirt, and raised eyebrows with his on-field exuberance. Benaud embraced his players when opposition wickets fell, something that was uncommon at the time. Benaud's bold leadership coupled with his charismatic nature and public relations ability enlivened interest in Test cricket among a public who had increasingly regarded it as boring.

== Playing style ==
Benaud was not a large spinner of the ball, but he was known for his ability to extract substantial bounce from the surface. In addition to his accurate probing consistency, he possessed a well-disguised googly and topspinner which tricked many batsmen and yielded him many wickets. In his later career, he added the flipper, a combination of the googly and top spinner which was passed to him by Bruce Dooland. Coupled with his subtle variations in flight and angle of the delivery, he kept the batsman under constant pressure. Benaud had the tendency to bowl around the wicket at a time when he was one of the first players to do so; it had an influence on spin bowlers like Shane Warne and Ashley Giles. Benaud was regarded as one of the finest close-fielders of his era, either at gully or in a silly position. As a batsman, he was tall and lithe, known for his hitting power, in particular his lofted driving ability from the front foot.

Johnnie Moyes said "Certainly Benaud received a little help from the roughened patches, but he could do what the off-spinners could not do: he could turn the ball, mostly slowly, sometimes with more life. His control was admirable, and when Benaud gets a batsman in trouble he rarely if ever gives him a loose one. He keeps him pinned down, probing and probing until the victim is well and truly enmeshed."

== Cricket career highlights ==
- Early in his career, he hit 100 runs against the West Indies in 78 minutes, the third fastest Test century of all time (in terms of minutes at the crease, not balls faced) and the second fastest by an Australian. *Benaud was in charge for the inaugural 1960–61 Frank Worrell Trophy against the West Indies, a series that included the famous Tied Test.
- Benaud's highest Test score of 122 was made against South Africa, Johannesburg, 1957–1958
- His best Test bowling effort of 7 for 72 was against India, Madras, 1956–1957
- He captained Australia in 28 Tests: 12 wins, 11 draws, 1 tie, 4 losses
- In 1963 he became the first player to complete the Test double of 200 wickets and 2,000 runs. He was one of only 10 Australian cricketers to have scored more than 10,000 runs and taken more than 500 wickets in first-class cricket. He ended his Test career in Sydney with statistics of 248 wickets (the Australia Test record at that time) at 27.03 and 2,201 runs at 24.45.

== Media career ==
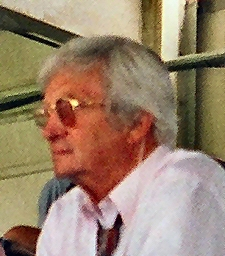
Richie Benaud during his media career

After the 1956 Ashes tour, Benaud stayed behind in London to take a BBC presenter training course. He took up a journalism position with the News of the World, beginning as a police roundsman before becoming a sports columnist. In 1960, he made his first radio commentary in the United Kingdom at the BBC, after which he moved into television.

After retiring from playing in 1964, Benaud turned to full-time cricket journalism and commentary, dividing his time between Britain (where he worked for the BBC for many years before joining Channel 4 in 1999), and Australia (for the Nine Network). Overall he played in or commentated on approximately 500 Test matches, as he himself noted in one of his final interviews in Britain when asked if he would miss Test cricket.

He openly criticised the actions by the Chappell brothers (Trevor and Greg) in the post-match reaction to the underarm bowling incident of 1981. He vacated the commentary booth when New Zealand was about to clinch a Test victory at Lord's in 1999, allowing former New Zealand captain-turned-commentator Ian Smith to call the famous victory of his compatriots. Some of his other memorable moments he commentated on included Shane Warne's "Ball of the Century", Ian Botham's dominant all-round display during the 1981 Ashes, Dennis Lillee overtaking Benaud's record for most wickets, and subsequent 300th and 310th wickets, and Andrew Symonds' tackle on a streaker.

The idea for what became his trademark—wearing a cream or white jacket during live commentary—came from Channel 9 owner Kerry Packer, who suggested the look to help Benaud stand out from the rest of the commentary team.

He also helped to design a computer-based parody of himself available for download off Channel 4's website called "Desktop Richie". It was developed by the software company Turtlez Ltd. Having downloaded this, cricket fans would be treated to live Test match updates and weather reports from a cartoon version of Benaud with real voice samples such as "Got 'im!" and "That's stumps ... and time for a glass of something chilled". On Channel 4's live commentary, Benaud often made sarcastic comments regarding the advertisement of Desktop Richie.

In 2004, Benaud starred in a series of television advertisements for the Australian Tourism Commission, aimed at promoting Australia as a tourist destination. Benaud's ad featured him in various scenic locations uttering his signature comment, "Marvellous!". It was also emulated by New Zealand broadcaster John Campbell. He appeared in Richie Benaud's Greatest XI, a video in which he chooses his own team.

Benaud became a staunch advocate of cricket being available on free-to-view TV. He chose to end his British commentary career, which spanned more than 42 years, when the rights to broadcast live Test match cricket were lost by Channel 4 to the subscription broadcaster British Sky Broadcasting. Thus, the 2005 Ashes series was the last that Benaud commentated on in Britain. His final commentary came near the end of the final day of the Fifth Test at the Oval. His last goodbye was interrupted by Glenn McGrath taking Kevin Pietersen's wicket; Benaud simply wove his description of the dismissal into what he was already saying. Benaud stated he would spend the Northern Hemisphere summer in Britain writing, and would continue working for the Nine Network in Australia.

Benaud commentated for the BBC TV highlights of the 2006–07 Ashes in Australia as part of his continuing commentary work for Australia's Nine Network.

Benaud's distinctive speaking style has been frequently parodied on the Australian comedy series Comedy Inc. and The Twelfth Man. In the case of the latter, comedian Billy Birmingham's impersonations of Benaud on The Twelfth Man comedy recordings have become very successful, spanning more than twenty years. Chris Barrie of Red Dwarf fame incorporated impressions of Benaud into his stand-up repertoire.

On 18 February 2009, during a radio interview, Benaud announced that he would be retiring from television commentary. Benaud said: "I'll be doing Australian cricket next year—2010—but I don't do any television at all anywhere else now and when I finish next year, then I'll be doing other things ... But that'll be no more television commentary".

It was announced on 15 November 2009, that Benaud had signed a three-year contract with the Nine Network to continue being part of their cricket coverage until 2013, although his role would change from that of ball-by-ball commentary. Benaud said: "I won't be doing live commentary any more." Someone asked me, "Does that mean you'll never again go into the commentary box?", "Well, the answer to that", Benaud replied, "If there is, as there always can be, some emergency or a sensational happening on or off the field where it would be quite ridiculous not to go into the commentary box, of course I'll be in there doing my job and doing it as professionally as I can. But I won't be on the live commentary roster. But I will be doing all sorts of, what I regard as, interesting things for Channel Nine on the cricket—special features on the cricket ...". Benaud commentated regularly during the 2011–12 season and was part of Nine's commentating team/roster.

== Personal life ==
"This is the greatest loss for cricket since the loss of Don Bradman and for that reason I'm pleased to have offered the Benaud family a state funeral. There would be very few Australians who have not passed a summer in the company of Richie Benaud. He was the accompaniment of an Australian summer, his voice was even more present than the chirping of the cicadas in our suburbs and towns, and that voice, tragically, is now still."

— Tony Abbott

Benaud married Marcia Lavender in 1953 and had two sons, Greg and Jeffery, from this marriage; he divorced Marcia in 1967. In 1967, he married his second wife, Daphne Surfleet, who had worked for the English cricket writer E. W. Swanton. Benaud and Daphne often stayed at their holiday home in Beaulieu-sur-Mer on the French Riviera.

On 29 October 2008, Benaud's mother, Irene, died, aged 104. He said of her, "She improved my love of vegetables by introducing the phrase, 'You can't go out and play cricket until you have eaten all your vegetables.'"

In October 2013, Benaud crashed his vintage 1965 Sunbeam Alpine into a wall while driving near his home in Coogee, a beachside suburb in Sydney's east. He sustained a cracked sternum and shoulder injuries. Slow recovery meant he was unable to commentate for Australia's Channel Nine during the 2013–14 Ashes series.

Benaud had last handed "Baggy green" caps to Simon Katich and Mitchell Starc when they made their Test debuts. Benaud's own was lost early in his Test career, and former captain—now commentator and the Director of Cricket Australia, Mark Taylor—was to present a replacement cap to him at the semi-final of the 2015 Cricket World Cup between Australia and India at the SCG, but Benaud was too unwell to attend, and when the cap arrived at Channel 9 headquarters, it was the day before Benaud died. It was presented to his wife.

== Death ==
In November 2014, at age 84, Benaud announced that he had been diagnosed with skin cancer. He died in his sleep on 10 April 2015.

Prime Minister Tony Abbott offered his family a state funeral; his widow, Daphne, declined, respecting his wishes for a private funeral.

Benaud was buried on 15 April, in a private funeral ceremony attended only by his immediate family. Later that same day, there was a commemoration service officiated by former teammate turned lay preacher Brian Booth; attendees included his family and close friends—among them former players, including Ian Chappell and Shane Warne, and Australian Test captain Michael Clarke.

== Recognition ==
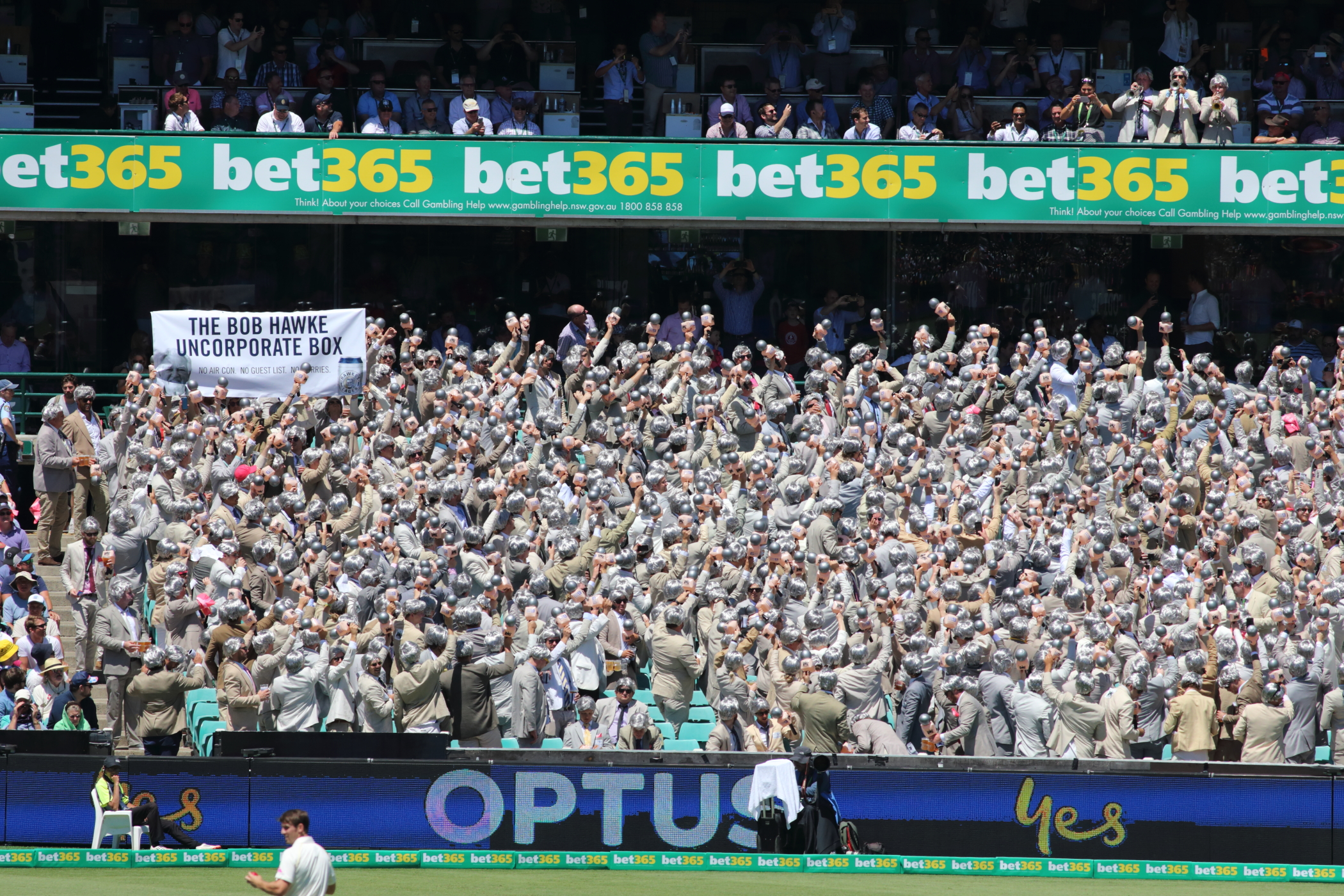
A stand of "Richies" during Day 2 of the 5th Test of the 2017/18 Ashes

Benaud was made an Officer of the Order of the British Empire (OBE) in 1961 for services to cricket. He was inducted into the Sport Australia Hall of Fame in 1985. In 1999, he was awarded a Logie Award for Most Outstanding Sports Broadcaster.

In 2007, he was inducted into the Australian Cricket Hall of Fame at the Allan Border Medal award evening and in 2009 he was inducted into the ICC Cricket Hall of Fame.

In November 2015, Benaud became an honouree at Bradman Foundation, having been a long-serving patron in his life. After rain interrupted the 2016 SCG Test against West Indies, the second day unofficially became Richie Benaud Day as 501 Benaud impersonators stayed at the SCG, which is a day before the annual Jane McGrath Day for Breast Cancer awareness and fundraising, which was again rained out.

In 2017, the Australian Mint issued a 50-cent coin commemorating Benaud.

In October 2018, Benaud became the 40th Legend in the Sport Australia Hall of Fame.

From 2010 to 2026, a group of cricket fans known as the "Richies" would dress up as Benaud in beige suits and grey wigs during Day 2 of the Sydney Test.

== Books ==
Benaud wrote a number of books:

- The Way of Cricket (1961)
- A Tale of Two Tests (1962)
- Spin Me a Spinner (1963)
- The New Champions (1966)
- Willow Patterns (1969)
- Test Cricket (1982)
- World Series Cup Cricket 1981–82 (1982)
- The Hottest Summer (1983)
- The Ashes 1982–83 (1983)
- Benaud on Reflection (1984)
- The Appeal of Cricket (1995)
- Anything But (1998)
- My Spin on Cricket (2005)
- Over But Not Out (2010)

== See also ==
- Benaud–Qadir Trophy – Test cricket series between Australia and Pakistan
- French Australian – Ethnic group
- List of international cricket five-wicket hauls by Richie Benaud
- List of New South Wales representative cricketers
