= Trevor Goddard (cricketer) =

South African cricketer (1931–2016)

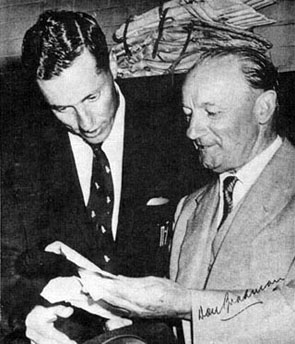
- Trevor Goddard (L) with Sir Donald Bradman

Personal information
- Full name: Trevor Leslie Goddard
- Born: 1 August 1931; Durban, Natal, Union of South Africa
- Died: 25 November 2016 (aged 85) near Fouriesburg, Free State, South Africa
- Height: 6 ft 2 in (1.88 m)
- Batting: Left-handed
- Bowling: Left-arm medium

International information
- National side: South Africa
- Test debut: 9 June 1955 v England
- Last Test: 19 February 1970 v Australia

Career statistics
Competition	Test	FC	LA
Matches	41	179	1
Runs scored	2,516	11,279	20
Batting average	34.46	40.57	20.00
100s/50s	1/18	26/54	0/0
Top score	112	222	20
Balls bowled	11,736	40,465	42
Wickets	123	534	0
Bowling average	26.22	21.65	–
5 wickets in innings	5	24	–
10 wickets in match	0	1	–
Best bowling	6/53	6/3	–
Catches/stumpings	48/–	175/–	0/–
- Source: CricketArchive, 3 March 2017

Trevor Leslie Goddard (1 August 1931 – 25 November 2016) was a South African cricketer. A left-handed all-rounder, he played 41 Test matches for South Africa from 1955 to 1970. He captained the young South African team on its five-month tour of Australia and New Zealand in the 1963–64 season, levelling the series with Australia, and was also captain in 1964–65 against England in South Africa.

A left-handed, classically correct opening batsman, Goddard was also a successful left-arm medium-pace bowler with 123 wickets at Test level. Among Test bowlers with 75 wickets or more, he is the most economical of all, conceding an average of only 1.64 runs per over. He enjoyed particular success at first-class level, with over 11,000 runs at 40.60 together with 534 wickets and a competitive 21.65. He played for Natal from 1952 to 1953 to 1965–66, for North-Eastern Transvaal in 1966–67 and 1967–68, then returned to Natal for his last two seasons, 1968–69 and 1969–70.

The cricket journalist Telford Vice has described Goddard as "a man of rare grace, intelligence and spirit". Sir Donald Bradman said he was "a completely reliable and honest player who could be depended upon before any season started to put up a sterling performance over a whole series", praised his "qualities of sincerity and integrity", and said that he "enriched the game of cricket and set a fine example".

After he retired from cricket, Goddard took up lay preaching and missionary work.

== Early life and career ==
Born in Durban, South Africa, Trevor Goddard was the youngest in a family of four boys whose father was a linotype operator with the Natal Mercury. Trevor played in the first XI at Durban High School from 1946 to 1948, scoring several centuries and taking many wickets as a left-arm orthodox spinner, often bowling in tandem with Arthur Tayfield, Hugh's younger brother. Along with Arthur Tayfield, he played in the South African Schools XI in 1948–49.

Fully grown, he stood six feet two inches. He changed to pace bowling when he began playing for the Tech club in Durban, which had a spin bowler (the Natal left-armer Les Payn) and needed a medium-pacer.

He also played soccer for Natal, but gave it up in 1954, partly to avoid injuries that might jeopardise his cricket career, and partly because he did not think it fair to ask his employers to give him leave to play two sports.

Goddard made his first-class debut for Natal against Transvaal at Durban in 1952–53, opening the bowling and batting at number seven. In his third match he hit his first century, 100 not out against Eastern Province, and he finished the season with 433 runs at 43.30 and 18 wickets at 30.00. The next season, he opened the batting for Natal with the captain, Jackie McGlew, and in his second match as opener he hit 174 and took 5 for 73 (also opening the bowling) against Western Province. He continued to perform consistently, helping Natal to victory in the Currie Cup in 1954–55 with 460 runs at 51.11, 10 catches, and 9 wickets at 16.00 in six matches, and was selected to tour England in 1955.

In September 1954 Goddard married Jean, who was born in England. They eventually had two children.

== Early Test career ==
=== 1955 series ===
In 23 matches on the 1955 tour, Goddard hit 1163 runs at 30.60 and took 60 wickets at 21.90. He played in all five Tests, opening the batting and, in two Tests, the bowling as well. In a series in which bowlers dominated, he took 25 wickets at 21.12 and made 235 runs at 23.50. He played a big part in the victory in the Fourth Test at Leeds, making 9 and 74 (in an opening partnership of 176 in four and a quarter hours with McGlew after South Africa had trailed by 20 on the first innings) and taking 2 for 39 and 5 for 69. On the last day he "bowled over the wicket without relief from 11.30 a.m. until the match was won at 4.12 pm", finishing with figures of 62–37–69–5. Summing up the tour, Norman Preston wrote that although Goddard "was obviously a cricketer of great possibilities"', he was mostly a "defensive cricketer": "When batting, survival at the crease was his main consideration, and when bowling ... he aimed persistently at or outside the leg stump to a field set suitably for those tactics".

=== 1956–57 series ===
When England toured South Africa in 1956–57, in another series dominated by the bowlers Goddard top-scored in four innings and led the South African aggregates and averages with 333 runs at 33.30, with a top score of 69. He also took 12 catches, which remains the South African record for a series (shared with Bert Vogler and Bruce Mitchell) and 15 wickets at 24.66. Wisden's summary said he was now "one of the big personalities in world cricket", but described his leg-side bowling as "not pretty to watch".

=== 1957–58 series ===
Goddard's bowling was less effective against the Australians the following season, yielding only 7 wickets at 59.57, but he scored 284 runs at 35.50. He hit 90 in the first innings of the First Test, when he put on 176 for the first wicket with McGlew, a record against Australia. In the second innings of the Second Test he opened and carried his bat for 56 not out in a team total of 99 all out and an innings defeat. He batted at number five in the Third Test, number four in the Fourth Test, then returned to open in the Fifth.

He maintained his form in the next two domestic seasons, taking 6 for 3 (figures of 11–9–3–6) when Natal dismissed Border for 16 in 1959–60, and making his first double-century, 200 against Rhodesia, two weeks later. He also captained Natal for the first time in one match (which Natal won).

=== 1960 series ===
Goddard toured England in 1960, an unsuccessful tour for South Africa that John Arlott described as "the unhappiest ever made by a party of overseas cricketers in England". The team vice-captain to McGlew, Goddard made 220 runs at 24.44 and took 17 wickets at 24.35 in the five Tests, although a new restriction of fielders on the leg side prevented his use of his more defensive bowling methods. In the Fifth Test, after England had been dismissed for 155 in the first innings, Goddard batted for six hours and 10 minutes in scoring 99 and helping South Africa to a lead of 264; but the match was drawn after a second-innings recovery by England and rain on the last day. In 24 matches on the tour he scored 1377 runs at 37.21, with four centuries, and took 73 wickets at 19.71, including career-best match figures of 10 for 79 against Lancashire. He captained the team in five matches.

He played only part of the 1960–61 season. In August 1961 he and his family went to live in England for a year. He had a job with Decca Records in London, and on weekends during the 1962 English cricket season he played as the club professional for Great Chell in the North Staffordshire League. He set a league record for runs in a season, scoring 1128 runs at 94.00, as well as taking 64 wickets at 12.15. He believed his season with Great Chell changed his attitude to playing. The clubs depend almost entirely on their professional, who must develop what Goddard called the "killer instinct".

Goddard returned to South Africa for the 1962–63 season, scoring 723 runs at 65.72 with four centuries, and taking 19 wickets at 21.31, as "his medium-paced deliveries gave indications of new-found subtlety".

== Test captaincy ==
=== 1963–64 series ===
Goddard was appointed captain of South Africa on its five-month tour of Australia and New Zealand in 1963–64. His employer was unable to give him so much leave, and he was only able to tour because the cricket-loving director of a large Durban store offered him a public relations position and time off to play cricket.

He suffered from severe sinusitis during the early part of the tour and spent time in hospital in Perth and Brisbane, where an operation after the First Test relieved the condition. He scored 454 runs at 64.85 and took 11 wickets at 38.18 in the five Tests against Australia, and led his young side to a one-all result with three Tests drawn. Sir Donald Bradman said he had "little doubt the South African side should have won the series" had they, and especially Goddard, had more confidence in their ability. Wally Grout agreed, saying, "Time and time again in the series, when a little boldness would have carried them through, they chose caution." Nevertheless, Goddard believed that, after the victory in the Fourth Test, "South Africa had at long last come out of its post-war chrysalis and had spread its wings as a Test-winning nation".

The three-Test series in New Zealand that followed finished with all matches drawn, although South Africa, despite being reduced at one stage to eleven fit men, had by far the better of all three matches. Goddard scored 233 runs at 46.60 and took 7 wickets at 20.28 (series figures of 140–81–142–7). He remarked at the end of the series that "with the weather and the playing conditions in New Zealand you can't expect to play good cricket".

=== 1964–65 series ===
Goddard took up the post of cricket organiser of the privately financed Sport Foundation of South Africa in late 1964.

Goddard was appointed captain for the five-Test series against the visiting English side in 1964–65. However, after England won the First Test and the next two were drawn, the selectors asked him to relinquish the captaincy. They wanted him to issue a statement, "the gist of which was that he had asked to be relieved of the captaincy". He refused to do so, and they let him remain captain for the rest of the series. When he scored his only Test century, 112, in the Fourth Test, "almost the entire England team moved over to congratulate this most popular player. The crowd rose for fully a minute. It was an inspiring spectacle." Goddard finished the series with 405 runs at 40.50, and 6 wickets at 51.66.

Disappointed with the way he had been handled, Goddard told the selectors during the Fourth Test that he would retire from Test cricket at the end of the series and would consequently be unavailable for the tour to England in 1965. They later offered him the captaincy of the touring team, but he was adamant.

== Later Test career ==
=== 1966–67 series ===
Goddard played the 1965–66 season for Natal, and at the end of the season he captained South to an overwhelming victory against North in a trial match, making 102 and taking 6 for 30 in the respective first innings.

Goddard captained a strong South African XI to an important victory against the Australian touring team early in December 1966, then made his highest score, 222 for North-Eastern Transvaal against Western Province a few days later. Under the captaincy of Peter van der Merwe (who in 1965 had named his son Trevor after Goddard) he played all five Tests against the Australians, scoring 294 runs at 32.66 and having his most successful series with the ball, taking 26 wickets at 16.23. After the Australian second innings in the First Test, when he took his best Test figures of 6 for 53 to give South Africa its first-ever Test victory over Australia in South Africa, he was carried off the field shoulder-high by the jubilant crowd. Asked why the Australians had found Goddard's deliveries so hard to play, Denis Lindsay replied, "Trevor's swinging them in circles." Eight of the South Africans who won the series 3–1 had toured in Goddard's team in 1963–64.

He continued his all-round form for North-Eastern Transvaal in 1967–68 and Natal in 1968–69. He took up the position of sports supervisor at the University of Natal in 1968, which combined administrative, coaching and mentoring duties. His protégés at the university included John Traicos and Vintcent van der Bijl.

=== 1969–70 series ===
In the first match in the Currie Cup in 1969–70, Goddard carried his bat for 85 not out for Natal against Western Province. His batting form fell away somewhat in the next few matches but his bowling was as effective as ever, and he was selected for the first three Tests against Australia. He opened the batting with Barry Richards in the first four innings of the series, and although he made only 16, 17, 17 and 6, his opening partnerships with Richards were worth 21, 52, 88 and 56. He took 9 wickets at 22.55, conceding only 203 runs from 126.3 overs, and taking the final three wickets of the Third Test to ensure South Africa's victory in the series.

Goddard had already said that it would be his last series. Immediately after the Third Test ended, while the players were celebrating in the dressing room, one of the selectors told Goddard he had been left out of the team for the final Test now that the series was won, so that the team should consist only of players who would be touring England later that year. The decision and its timing were widely unpopular. Peter Pollock said "it was no way to say thanks to a man who had been involved almost from the start in South Africa's rise to cricketing glory". Trevor Chesterfield described it as "cruel and unnecessary; an act which took some of the sparkle out of the 4–0 whitewash". The captain, Ali Bacher, said that despite the team's success, the day was "one of the saddest since I first played Test cricket for South Africa". Goddard himself simply said, "I wouldn't be human if I did not say I was disappointed. But that's life."

He ended his first-class career a month later by leading Natal to victory against Rhodesia in Salisbury, and taking a hat-trick.

== After cricket ==
In Caught in the Deep, Goddard's memoir of his life after cricket, he wrote: "As the clouds of controversy following my exclusion from the Springbok team began to lift, it gradually began to dawn on me that as far as reality and true fulfilment was concerned I had almost certainly been on the wrong track." "I had always tried to live by certain standards which I had presumed were acceptable to God," he wrote, but he now believed he had been self-righteous in this presumption and, he wrote, "I was looking towards God and seeing Him raise His finger. In God's judgement I was undeniably out." He and his wife began to pursue a more intense kind of Christian belief.

Jean died of cancer in 1975. Goddard resigned from his position at the University of Natal in 1977 and took up lay preaching and missionary work. He conducted many missions in secondary schools. In 1978 he married a widow, Lesley. In December 1985, while driving alone near Graaff-Reinet, he fell asleep at the wheel and his car left the road and crashed; he sustained multiple injuries and spent weeks in hospital, but eventually recovered fully.

In his final years Goddard lived with his daughter on her farm in Free State. He died on 25 November 2016 at the age of 85 after a long illness.

== Sources ==
- Goddard, T. (1988), Caught in the Deep, Vision Media, East London.
- Short, G. (1965) The Trevor Goddard Story, Purfleet, Durban.

Preceded by Jackie McGlew	South African Test cricket captain 1963/4 – 1964/5	Succeeded by Peter van der Merwe
