= Joe Partridge =

Rhodesian cricketer (1932–1988)

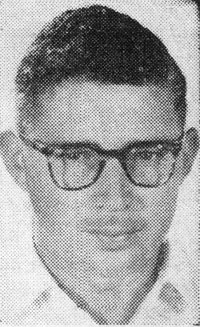

Personal information
- Born: 9 December 1932; Bulawayo, Matabeleland, Southern Rhodesia
- Died: 6 June 1988 (aged 55); Harare, Zimbabwe
- Batting: Right-handed
- Bowling: Right-arm fast-medium

International information
- National side: South Africa
- Test debut: 6 December 1963 v Australia
- Last Test: 22 January 1965 v England

Career statistics
Competition	Test	First-class
Matches	11	77
Runs scored	73	523
Batting average	10.42	9.17
100s/50s	0/0	0/0
Top score	13*	29*
Balls bowled	3,684	20,266
Wickets	44	376
Bowling average	31.20	20.77
5 wickets in innings	3	24
10 wickets in match	0	3
Best bowling	7/91	8/69
Catches/stumpings	6/–	21/–
- Source: Cricinfo, 2 March 2020

Joseph Titus Partridge (9 December 1932 – 6 June 1988) was a Southern Rhodesian cricketer who played in 11 Test matches for South Africa between 1963 and 1965. A fast-medium bowler, he formed a potent new-ball partnership with Peter Pollock on the 1963–64 tour of Australia and New Zealand, taking 38 wickets at a bowling average of 28.42 in the eight Test matches. Unusually for a fast bowler, he wore spectacles while playing.
