= John Waite (cricketer) =

South African cricketer (1930–2011)

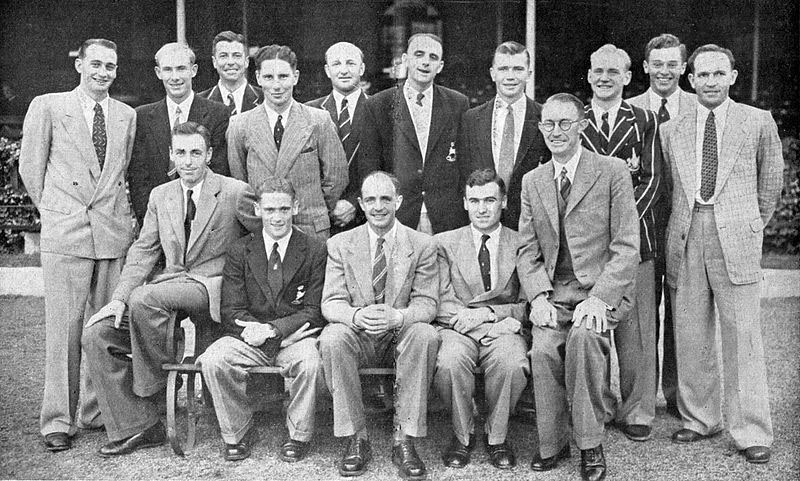
- The South African touring team in 1952–53. Waite is seated at left.

Personal information
- Full name: John Henry Bickford Waite
- Born: 19 January 1930; Johannesburg, South Africa
- Died: 22 June 2011 (aged 81)
- Batting: Right-handed
- Role: Wicketkeeper-batsman

International information
- National side: South Africa
- Test debut: 7 June 1951 v England
- Last Test: 12 February 1965 v England

Career statistics
Competition	Test	First-class
Matches	50	199
Runs scored	2405	9812
Batting average	30.44	35.04
100s/50s	4/16	23/45
Top score	134	219
Balls bowled	–	20
Wickets	–	0
Bowling average	–	–
5 wickets in innings	–	–
10 wickets in match	–	–
Best bowling	–	–
Catches/stumpings	124/17	427/84
- Source: Cricinfo, 3 December 2020

John Henry Bickford Waite (19 January 1930 – 22 June 2011) was a South African cricketer who played in fifty Tests from 1951 to 1965.

He was born in Johannesburg, Transvaal, and educated at Hilton College and Rhodes University. A right-handed batsman and wicket keeper, he was the first South African to play 50 Tests for his country and is generally acknowledged to be one of South Africa's finest wicket keepers. His total of 141 dismissals in Test matches stood as a record for his country until it was overtaken by Dave Richardson. In 1953–54 he set a new Test best of 23 dismissals in a single series, against New Zealand and broke his own record in 1961–62, with 26, also against New Zealand. He was also a solid batsman, scoring 76 on debut against England at Trent Bridge, and averaging over 30 in Tests with four Test centuries.

In addition to his Test career, he played first class cricket for Eastern Province and Transvaal, making his debut in 1948 and retiring in 1966. His highest first-class score was 219 for Eastern Province against Griqualand West.
