= Colin Bland =

South African cricketer

Personal information
- Full name: Kenneth Colin Bland
- Born: 5 April 1938; Bulawayo, Southern Rhodesia
- Died: 14 April 2018 (aged 80); London, England
- Batting: Right-handed
- Bowling: Right-arm medium

International information
- National side: South Africa (1961-1966)
- Test debut: 8 December 1961 v New Zealand
- Last Test: 23 December 1966 v Australia

Career statistics
Competition	Test	First-class
Matches	21	131
Runs scored	1,669	7,249
Batting average	49.08	37.95
100s/50s	3/9	13/34
Top score	144*	197
Balls bowled	394	3,508
Wickets	2	43
Bowling average	62.50	35.27
5 wickets in innings	0	0
10 wickets in match	0	0
Best bowling	2/16	4/40
Catches/stumpings	10/–	51/–
- Source: CricInfo, 3 December 2020

Kenneth Colin Bland (5 April 1938 – 14 April 2018) was a Rhodesian cricketer who played in 21 Test matches for South Africa in the 1960s. He is regarded as one of the greatest fielders in the history of Test cricket.

== Cricket career ==
Colin Bland was educated at Milton High School in Bulawayo. He made his first-class debut for Rhodesia as a schoolboy against Peter May's English team in 1956–57 and went on to represent them 55 times from 1956 to 1968. He later played for the South African provincial sides Eastern Province and Orange Free State.

A tall and elegant right-handed batsman, Bland broke into the South African Test team in 1961, and was a regular until 1966–67. As South Africa in the apartheid era played Test cricket only against England, Australia and New Zealand, his career was restricted to just 21 Tests, in which he scored 1,669 runs, including three centuries. His highest Test score came in the Second Test against England at Johannesburg in 1964–65; South Africa followed on 214 behind, and were 109 for 4 in the second innings when Bland came in and hit 144 not out in just over four hours to save the match.

Bland's chief claim to fame, though, rested on his fielding. The general consensus is that he was the finest cover fieldsman of his time, and rated by some as the finest fielder ever. His spectacular run out of Ken Barrington in the Lord's Test of 1965, followed by a similar dismissal of Jim Parks, may have prevented England from establishing a match-winning first innings lead, the match eventually being drawn. Brian Johnston recalled of the 1965 tour, "For the first time I heard people saying that they must go to a match especially to watch a fielder."

Bland was a Wisden Cricketer of the Year in 1966; he is one of only two players so honoured (the other is Stuart Surridge) to be depicted in the accompanying portrait fielding, rather than batting, bowling or keeping. When Wisden asked Peter van der Merwe in 1999 to name the five outstanding cricketers of the twentieth century, he included Colin Bland, saying, "He revolutionised the attitude to fielding, and set a standard not yet equalled."

Bland retired from Test cricket after injury forced him out of the side after the first Test in 1966–67. He continued to play first-class cricket in South Africa until the 1973–74 season.

== Death ==
On 14 April 2018, Bland died at his home in London after a prolonged battle with colon cancer.
