= English cricket team in South Africa in 1927–28 =

International cricket tour

England in South Africa in 1927–28
	England	South Africa
- Dates: 12 November 1927 – 21 February 1928
Captains	RT Stanyforth (1st–4th Test); GTS Stevens (5th Test)	HG Deane

Test series
- Result: 5-match series drawn 2–2
Most runs	GE Tyldesley (520)	HW Taylor (412)
Most wickets	WR Hammond (15)	GF Bissett (25)

The England cricket team toured South Africa during the 1927–28 season, playing five Test matches against the South Africa national team and 13 tour matches under the banner of the Marylebone Cricket Club against local sides. The tour began on 12 November 1927 with a match against Western Province and ended on 21 February 1928 at the conclusion of another match against the same side. The five Tests were played between 24 December 1927 and 8 February 1928. The Test series was drawn 2–2, with England winning the first two and South Africa the last two, with a drawn Test in the middle.

Guy Jackson was selected as the captain of the touring side in July 1927. He withdrew in October owing to illness. He was replaced by RT Stanyforth as the captain and Percy Holmes as a player.

== Test series ==
=== 1st Test ===
24–27 December 1927
Scorecard

South Africa	v	England
196 (78.3 overs); RH Catterall 86; G Geary 7/70 (27.3 overs)		313 (137.3 overs); GE Tyldesley 122; HLE Promnitz 5/58 (37 overs)
170 (69.2 overs); CL Vincent 53; WR Hammond 5/36 (21.2 overs)		57/0 (21 overs); H Sutcliffe 41*

England won by 10 wickets
Old Wanderers, Johannesburg
Umpires: AG Laver (SA) and GB Treadwell (SA)

- South Africa won the toss and elected to bat.
- WE Astill, WR Hammond, GB Legge, IAR Peebles, RT Stanyforth, RES Wyatt (all Eng), HB Cameron, SK Coen, JP Duminy, DPB Morkel, HLE Promnitz and CL Vincent (all SA) made their Test debuts.

=== 2nd Test ===
31 December 1927 – 4 January 1928
Scorecard

England	v	South Africa
133 (59.1 overs); WR Hammond 43; GF Bissett 5/37 (17 overs)		250 (101 overs); HW Taylor 68; AP Freeman 4/58 (29 overs)
428 (158.5 overs); H Sutcliffe 99; HLE Promnitz 3/56 (30 overs)		224 (101.1 overs); HW Taylor 71; WE Astill 3/48 (29 overs)

England won by 87 runs
Newlands, Cape Town
Umpires: HV Adams (SA) and GB Treadwell (SA)

- South Africa won the toss and elected to field.
- GF Bissett and AW Palm (both SA) made their Test debuts.
- An appeal against the dark colour of the ball by the batsman in the opening over was turned down as the ball had been chosen by both captains.

=== 3rd Test ===
21–25 January 1928
Scorecard

South Africa	v	England
246 (104.3 overs); HG Deane 77; RES Wyatt 3/4 (13 overs)		430 (139.3 overs); WR Hammond 90; CL Vincent 6/131 (45 overs)
464/8d (157 overs); JFW Nicolson 78; AP Freeman 3/122 (33 overs)		132/2 (42.2 overs); GE Tyldesley 62*; EP Nupen 1/29 (10.2 overs)

Match drawn
Kingsmead, Durban
Umpires: AG Laver (SA) and C Saunders (SA)

- South Africa won the toss and elected to bat.
- SJ Staples (Eng), JFW Nicolson, AL Ochse and IJ Siedle (all SA) made their Test debuts.
- This Test match holds the record for the highest aggregate (1272) without a player scoring a century.

=== 4th Test ===
28 January – 1 February 1928
Scorecard

England	v	South Africa
265 (125.4 overs); RES Wyatt 58; AE Hall 6/100 (42.4 overs)		328 (92.3 overs); HW Taylor 101; WR Hammond 3/62 (22 overs)
215 (72 overs); P Holmes 63; GF Bissett 4/70 (17 overs)		156/6 (49.2 overs); DPB Morkel 45; SJ Staples 3/67 (21 overs)

South Africa won by 4 wickets
Old Wanderers, Johannesburg
Umpires: ES Page and GA Verheyen

- South Africa won the toss and elected to field.

=== 5th Test ===
4–8 February 1928
Scorecard

England	v	South Africa
282 (102.5 overs); GE Tyldesley 100; EP Nupen 5/83 (33.5 overs)		332/7d (113 overs); RH Catterall 119; SJ Staples 3/96 (44 overs)
118 (55 overs); H Sutcliffe 23; GF Bissett 7/29 (19 overs)		69/2 (23.3 overs); HW Taylor 29; WR Hammond 1/25 (10 overs)

South Africa won by 8 wickets
Kingsmead, Durban
Umpires: AG Laver and GB Treadwell

- South Africa won the toss and elected to field.
- No play was possible on day 1 due to rain.
- EW Dawson and H Elliott (both Eng) made their Test debuts.
