= List of Test cricket umpires =

Cricket umpires

This is a list of cricket umpires who have officiated at least one men's Test match. As of October 16, 2026, 504 umpires have officiated in a Test match.^{NB} Current members of the Emirates Elite Panel of ICC Umpires, appointed by the International Cricket Council to officiate in Test matches and One Day Internationals, are shown in bold. Current members of the Emirates International Panel of ICC Umpires, who may also be called upon to officiate in Test matches in busy cricketing years, are marked with a dagger (†).

In December 2019, in the first match between Australia and New Zealand, Aleem Dar stood in his 129th Test match, breaking the record previously set by Steve Bucknor.

== List of umpires ==
As of 1 July 2025

Umpire	Country	Tests	From	To
Ellis Achong	West Indies	1	1954	1954
Harry Adams	South Africa	2	1921	1928
Akhtar Hussain	Pakistan	3	1959	1969
Javed Akhtar	Pakistan	18	1980	1998
A. F. M. Akhtaruddin	Bangladesh	2	2001	2002
Brian Aldridge	New Zealand	26	1986	1995
Bill Alley	England	10	1974	1981
George Allsop	South Africa	1	1896	1896
Amanullah Khan	Pakistan	13	1975	1987
Amiesh Saheba	India	3	2008	2009
Ignatius Anandappa	Sri Lanka	3	1992	1993
William Anderson	South Africa	2	1961	1961
Basil Anthony	Sri Lanka	1	1983	1983
David Archer	West Indies	28	1981	1992
Philip Argall	Australia	7	1902	1908
Henry Armstrong	Australia	1	1931	1931
Bill Ashdown	England	3	1949	1950
Richard Ashman	South Africa	14	1935	1950
Alfred Atfield	England	8	1910	1914
Athar Zaidi	Pakistan	8	1990	2002
George Ayling	India	1	1956	1956
Jack Badley	West Indies	1	1930	1930
Robin Bailhache	Australia	27	1974	1988
Charles Bain	West Indies	1	1965	1965
Herbert Baldwin	England	9	1946	1953
Sunil Banerjee	India	1	1964	1964
Charles Bannerman	Australia	12	1887	1902
Shyam Bansal	India	6	1993	2001
Kevan Barbour	Zimbabwe	4	1999	2001
Lloyd Barker	West Indies	29	1984	1997
Andrew Barlow	Australia	11	1931	1951
Dick Barlow	England	1	1899	1899
Thomas Bartley	England	6	1954	1956
Leslie Baxter	South Africa	4	1964	1966
George Beet snr.	England	1	1946	1946
Mark Benson	England	27	2004	2009
Billy Bestwick	England	3	1929	1930
Gordon Beves	South Africa	1	1896	1896
S. K. Bhattacharya	India	2	1964	1969
Dickie Bird	England	66	1973	1996
Jack Birkenshaw	England	2	1986	1988
Alfred Birkett	South Africa	2	1957	1958
J. G. Blackman	West Indies	1	1935	1935
George Borwick	Australia	24	1931	1948
Sukha Bose	India	1	1983	1983
Billy Bowden	New Zealand	84	2000	2015
Len Braund	England	3	1926	1929
Gregory Brathwaite †	West Indies	8	2021	2022
Bruce Bricknell	New Zealand	1	1982	1982
Edward Brook	New Zealand	1	1951	1951
Tom Brooks	Australia	23	1970	1978
Chris Brown †	New Zealand	11	2020	2025
John Brown	New Zealand	2	1963	1964
Steve Bucknor	West Indies	128	1989	2009
Lloyd Budd	England	4	1976	1978
Syd Buller	England	33	1956	1969
Tom Burgess	New Zealand	1	1933	1933
Perry Burke	West Indies	6	1954	1960
Sam Burke	West Indies	3	1935	1953
Donald Burns	New Zealand	1	1964	1964
Robert Burrows	England	1	1926	1926
William Butler	New Zealand	2	1930	1932
Harry Butt	England	6	1921	1926
Dooland Buultjens	Sri Lanka	3	1984	1986
Richard Callaway	Australia	3	1901	1902
John Carlin	England	4	1905	1909
Robert Carpenter	England	2	1886	1888
H. B. Cassie	New Zealand	1	1964	1964
K. H. Cave	New Zealand	6	1930	1933
Iknow Chabi †	Zimbabwe	1	2023	2023
Anil Chaudhary	India	4	2021	2022
Arthur Chester	England	1	1896	1896
Frank Chester	England	48	1924	1955
Harry Chidgey	England	1	1926	1926
Habib Choudhury	India	4	1960	1964
Leslie Clark	New Zealand	2	1956	1956
C. Clements	England	1	1893	1893
P. Coady	Australia	1	1879	1879
Thomas Cobcroft	Australia	3	1930	1930
Arthur Cocks	Australia	1	1951	1951
C. M. P. Coetzee	South Africa	3	1970	1970
Reggie Cole	West Indies	1	1962	1962
Tom Cole	Australia	1	1884	1884
Alfred Coleman	England	2	1947	1947
J. C. Collings	South Africa	9	1931	1936
Dal Collins	South Africa	10	1949	1962
Jack Collins	Australia	5	1973	1975
Stanley Collins	South Africa	1	1954	1954
David Constant	England	36	1971	1988
Ernest Cooke	England	1	1948	1948
George Cooper	Australia	2	1948	1950
B. C. Cooray	Sri Lanka	21	1992	2001
Cyril Coote	South Africa	1	1953	1953
William Copeland	Australia	1	1980	1980
D. E. A. Copps	New Zealand	13	1965	1977
Sam Cosstick	Australia	1	1877	1877
V. J. Costello	South Africa	6	1957	1965
George Coulthard	Australia	2	1879	1882
Doug Cowie	New Zealand	22	1995	2002
Jack Cowie	New Zealand	3	1956	1959
Tony Crafter	Australia	33	1979	1992
Jack Crapp	England	4	1964	1965
William Creese	South Africa	1	1902	1902
Bob Crockett	Australia	32	1901	1925
Peter Cronin	Australia	1	1980	1980
Clyde Cumberbatch	West Indies	12	1981	1995
William Curran	Australia	2	1910	1911
R. G. Currie	New Zealand	2	1953	1955
Aleem Dar †	Pakistan	145	2003	2023
J. Da Silva	West Indies	1	1948	1948
Daud Khan	Pakistan	14	1955	1973
Dai Davies	England	22	1947	1958
Emrys Davies	England	9	1956	1959
Owen Davies	West Indies	3	1962	1965
Steve Davis	Australia	57	1997	2015
Asoka de Silva	Sri Lanka	49	2000	2011
C. R. Deare	South Africa	1	1889	1889
Charles Dench	England	1	1909	1909
Dinkar Desai	India	3	1955	1956
**Kumar Dharmasena**	Sri Lanka	96	2010	2026
Wilf Diedricks	South Africa	1	1992	1992
Billy Doctrove	West Indies	38	2000	2012
Arthur Dolphin	England	6	1933	1937
Dara Dotiwalla	India	6	1982	1987
George Downs	Australia	1	1892	1892
Henry Draper	England	1	1893	1893
James Draper	South Africa	5	1964	1970
D. T. Drew	South Africa	3	1950	1954
Barry Dudleston	England	2	1991	1992
Nigel Duguid	West Indies	1	2022	2022
Douglas Dumbleton	New Zealand	2	1963	1964
Clyde Duncan	West Indies	2	1991	1994
Steve Dunne	New Zealand	39	1989	2002
Colin Egar	Australia	29	1960	1969
Dave Elder	Australia	12	1911	1929
Charlie Elliott	England	42	1957	1974
Ted Elliott	Australia	7	1882	1885
Harry Elliott	England	7	1950	1953
Herbert Elphinstone	Australia	10	1948	1953
Peter Enright	Australia	3	1972	1974
Marais Erasmus	South Africa	82	2010	2024
David Evans	England	9	1981	1985
Ric Evans	Australia	3	1989	1990
Tom Ewart	West Indies	7	1948	1958
Arthur Fagg	England	18	1967	1975
Frank Farrands	England	7	1884	1888
Desmond Fell	South Africa	1	1961	1961
Alane Felsinger	Sri Lanka	1	1986	1986
Herbi Felsinger	Sri Lanka	6	1982	1986
Feroze Butt	Pakistan	1	1990	1990
Isaac Fisher	Australia	1	1884	1884
Tom Flynn	Australia	4	1892	1895
John Forrester	New Zealand	2	1932	1933
Campbell Foster	West Indies	1	1948	1948
K. T. Francis	Sri Lanka	25	1982	1999
Dick French	Australia	19	1977	1987
Walter French	Australia	2	1931	1931
Simon Fry	Australia	7	2015	2017
**Chris Gaffaney**	New Zealand	70	2014	2026
Bhairab Ganguli	India	5	1982	1985
Santosh Ganguli	India	10	1956	1965
W. R. C. Gardiner	New Zealand	9	1974	1980
Clement Garing	Australia	1	1925	1925
Johnny Gayle	West Indies	3	1972	1986
Nadeem Ghauri	Pakistan	5	2005	2006
Jiban Ghosh	India	4	1979	1986
Sunit Ghosh	India	2	1988	1988
Douglas Gibbon	South Africa	1	1962	1962
Wing Gillette	West Indies	5	1948	1958
Gunther Goldman	South Africa	2	1966	1970
Gerry Gomez	West Indies	1	1965	1965
Fred Goodall	New Zealand	24	1965	1988
Nelson Gooneratne	Sri Lanka	1	1985	1985
Quintin Goosen	Zimbabwe	1	1995	1995
I. Gopalakrishnan	India	7	1961	1969
Ralph Gosein	West Indies	25	1965	1978
Madhav Gothoskar	India	14	1973	1983
Ian Gould	England	74	2008	2019
Michael Gough	England	42	2016	2025
Harry Gourlay	New Zealand	1	1946	1946
Lindsay Grant	West Indies	1	1930	1930
Laurie Gray	England	2	1955	1963
Luke Greenwood	England	1	1882	1882
Frank Grey	South Africa	10	1910	1922
Victor Guillen	West Indies	2	1935	1948
Ram Babu Gupta	India	11	1986	1988
Mahendra Gupte	India	1	1985	1985
W. J. C. Gwynne	New Zealand	3	1956	1966
Darrell Hair	Australia	78	1992	2008
John Hampshire	England	21	1989	2002
William Hannah	Australia	4	1907	1911
S. N. Hanumantha Rao	India	9	1978	1983
Enamul Haque	Bangladesh	1	2012	2012
Joe Hardstaff Sr.	England	21	1928	1935
Krishna Hariharan	India	2	2005	2006
Daryl Harper	Australia	95	1998	2011
Clyde Harris	New Zealand	4	1952	1956
S. L. Harris	South Africa	4	1910	1923
J. V. Hart-Davis	South Africa	4	1948	1950
Mick Harvey	Australia	2	1979	1980
John Hastie	New Zealand	7	1974	1981
William Hearn	England	4	1893	1902
Frank Hearne	South Africa	6	1899	1906
George Hele	Australia	16	1928	1933
B. Henderson	West Indies	1	1948	1948
John Hickson	England	1	1889	1889
Arthur Hide	England	1	1899	1889
John Higgins	England	1	1934	1934
Ian Higginson	New Zealand	1	1983	1983
Allen Hill	England	1	1890	1890
Tony Hill	New Zealand	40	2001	2013
R. D. R. Hill	West Indies	1	1930	1930
Joe Hills	England	1	1947	1947
Bill Hitch	England	4	1933	1935
George Hodges	Australia	1	1885	1885
John Holder	England	11	1988	2001
**Adrian Holdstock**	South Africa	23	2020	2026
Ian Howell	South Africa	9	2001	2007
Col Hoy	Australia	9	1954	1961
Idrees Baig	Pakistan	9	1955	1969
Ikram Rabbani	Pakistan	1	1991	1991
**Richard Illingworth**	England	84	2012	2026
Ray Isherwood	Australia	3	1984	1985
Stuart Ishmael	West Indies	2	1971	1974
Bertice Jacelon	West Indies	2	1962	1962
Arani Jayaprakash	India	13	1997	2002
Albert Jelley	New Zealand	1	1956	1956
Arthur Jenkins	Australia	1	1930	1930
Arthur Jepson	England	4	1966	1969
Brian Jerling	South Africa	4	2006	2006
C. John	West Indies	2	1953	1953
Mel Johnson	Australia	21	1980	1987
L. C. Johnston	New Zealand	1	1963	1963
Alfred Jones	Australia	7	1903	1929
Cortez Jordan	West Indies	22	1953	1974
Bapu Joshi	India	12	1948	1965
Kantilal Kanjee	Zimbabwe	4	1992	1994
Khalid Aziz	Pakistan	3	1978	1992
Khizer Hayat	Pakistan	34	1980	1996
**Richard Kettleborough**	England	99	2010	2026
Hayward Kidson	South Africa	11	1961	1967
Albert King	South Africa	3	1931	1931
Christopher King	New Zealand	3	1993	1997
Len King	Australia	6	1989	1993
David Kinsella	New Zealand	3	1981	1983
Cecil Kippins	West Indies	10	1958	1973
Swaroop Kishen	India	17	1978	1984
Mervyn Kitchen	England	20	1990	2000
Enos Knibbs	West Indies	2	1930	1935
Wayne Knights†	New Zealand	4	2020	2022
Rudi Koertzen	South Africa	108	1992	2010
Sudhakar Kulkarni	India	1	1990	1990
S. V. Kumaraswamy	India	1	1961	1961
James Laing	Australia	1	1908	1908
Barry Lambson	South Africa	5	1992	1995
John Langridge	England	7	1960	1963
Arthur Laver	South Africa	10	1921	1928
Joseph Leaney	England	1	1892	1892
Reg Ledwidge	Australia	3	1975	1977
Frank Lee	England	29	1949	1962
Eric Lee Kow	West Indies	9	1953	1960
Karl Liebenberg	South Africa	9	1992	1995
James Lillywhite (jnr)	England	6	1882	1899
Nigel Llong	England	62	2008	2020
Sandy Lloyd	West Indies	3	1958	1960
Jeremy Lloyds	England	5	2004	2005
E. C. A. MacKintosh	New Zealand	8	1964	1973
Alan Mackley	Australia	1	1963	1963
Jayaraman Madanagopal†	India	3	2025	2026
Mahboob Shah	Pakistan	28	1975	1997
Mahbubur Rahman	Bangladesh	1	2002	2002
B. V. Malan	South Africa	6	1950	1957
Wesley Malcolm	West Indies	2	1978	1983
Neil Mallender	England	3	2003	2004
A. M. Mamsa	India	6	1964	1973
Peter Manuel	Sri Lanka	11	1993	2001
Wilhelm Marais	South Africa	5	1956	1958
Bruce Martin	Australia	1	1985	1985
Trevor Martin	New Zealand	15	1963	1973
Ranmore Martinesz	Sri Lanka	8	2013	2016
Masood Salahuddin	Pakistan	1	1955	1955
Okey McCabe	South Africa	1	1953	1953
Peter McConnell	Australia	22	1983	1992
Rodger McHarg	New Zealand	3	1986	1991
Mel McInnes	Australia	16	1951	1959
J. McLellan	New Zealand	3	1951	1955
James McMenamin	South Africa	4	1956	1958
Tony McQuillan	Australia	1	1993	1993
Patrick McShane	Australia	1	1885	1885
Rajan Mehra	India	2	1986	1987
**Nitin Menon**	India	38	2019	2026
Badge Menzies	West Indies	1	1954	1954
Barrie Meyer	England	26	1978	1993
Mohammad Aslam	Pakistan	8	1984	2001
Audley Miller	England	2	1896	1896
Arthur Millward	England	2	1907	1921
Cyril Mitchley	South Africa	26	1992	2000
Mohammad Aslam	Pakistan	3	1973	1977
Mohammad Ghouse	India	8	1976	1979
Mohammad Gulzar Mir	Pakistan	1	1969	1969
Mohammad Nazir	Pakistan	4	1997	2000
Mohammad Yunus	India	5	1958	1965
Sadique Mohammed	West Indies	3	1981	1986
Balkrishna Mohoni	India	11	1948	1956
Robert Monteith	New Zealand	6	1974	1979
O. R. Montgomery	New Zealand	1	1947	1947
George Morris	New Zealand	4	1985	1987
Arthur Morton	England	1	1928	1928
John Moss	England	11	1902	1921
Munawar Hussain	Pakistan	5	1959	1969
Murawwat Hussain	Pakistan	1	1959	1959
Thomas Mycroft	England	2	1899	1902
Noshirvan Nagarwala	India	5	1952	1960
M. V. Nagendra	India	11	1964	1977
M. M. Naidu	India	1	1951	1951
Dattatraya Naik	India	1	1948	1948
A. L. Narasimhan	India	1	1994	1994
David Narine	West Indies	3	1983	1985
Eddie Nicholls	West Indies	17	1997	2001
Sam Nogajski†	Australia	2	2025	2025
Max O'Connell	Australia	19	1971	1980
Thomas Oates	England	5	1928	1930
Buddy Oldfield	England	2	1960	1962
Dave Orchard	South Africa	44	1995	2004
James Orr	Australia	1	1931	1931
Don Oslear	England	5	1980	1984
Bruce Oxenford	Australia	62	2010	2021
E. S. Page	South Africa	1	1928	1928
W. P. Page	New Zealand	1	1932	1932
Ahmed Shah Pakteen†	Afghanistan	2	2021	2021
**Allahudien Paleker**	South Africa	13	2022	2026
Ruchira Palliyaguruge	Sri Lanka	9	2018	2021
Ken Palmer	England	22	1978	1994
Roy Palmer	England	2	1992	1993
Sambhu Pan	India	9	1961	1969
Peter Parker	Australia	10	1993	2008
Frederick Parris	England	1	1909	1909
Stanton Parris	West Indies	5	1974	1983
George Parry	South Africa	2	1962	1962
W. R. Parry	England	5	1928	1930
K. Parthasarathy	India	2	1994	1998
Jamshed Patel	India	9	1948	1958
Frederick Payne	South Africa	1	1954	1954
John Payne	Australia	1	1885	1885
Cleophas Paynter	West Indies	1	1977	1977
Terry Pearce	New Zealand	3	1952	1956
M. F. Pengelly	New Zealand	4	1946	1952
Camillus Perera	Sri Lanka	1	1986	1986
Jim Phillips	Australia	29	1885	1906
William Phillips	England	2	1921	1921
Eddie Phillipson	England	12	1958	1965
Nigel Plews	England	11	1988	1995
Selliah Ponnadurai	Sri Lanka	3	1985	1993
Fred Price	England	8	1964	1967
Terry Prue	Australia	9	1988	1994
Charles Pullin	England	10	1884	1893
Ram Punjabi	India	7	1979	1981
Qamaruddin Butt	Pakistan	1	1965	1965
Dave Quested	New Zealand	5	1995	2001
Amjad Qureshi	Pakistan	2	1959	1959
S. K. Raghunatha Rao	India	7	1961	1967
V. Rajagopal	India	1	1969	1969
T. A. Ramachandran	India	1	1948	1948
Kasturi Ramaswami	India	8	1976	1983
VK Ramaswamy	India	26	1985	1999
Prageeth Rambukwella†	Sri Lanka	1	2025	2025
S. R. Ramchandra Rao	India	1	1987	1987
Steve Randell	Australia	36	1984	1998
R. S. Rathore	India	2	1990	1993
Asad Rauf	Pakistan	49	2005	2014
Sundaram Ravi	India	33	2013	2019
Elisha Rawlinson	Australia	1	1887	1887
**Ahsan Raza**	Pakistan	31	2021	2026
Courtenay Reece	West Indies	1	1935	1935
Bill Reeves	England	5	1924	1939
Curtis Reid	Australia	1	1877	1877
John Reid	South Africa	1	1923	1923
**Paul Reiffel**	Australia	81	2012	2026
Piloo Reporter	India	14	1984	1993
Judah Reuben	India	10	1969	1977
Dusty Rhodes	England	8	1963	1973
Rashid Riaz†	Pakistan	1	2026	2026
Riazuddin	Pakistan	12	1990	2002
Joseph Richards	Australia	1	1931	1931
Walter Richards	England	10	1899	1912
Arthur Richardson	Australia	2	1935	1935
Charles Richardson	England	2	1902	1902
Jackie Roberts	West Indies	2	1960	1962
Emmott Robinson	England	1	1938	1938
Ian Robinson	Zimbabwe	28	1992	2001
Toby Rollox	West Indies	1	1953	1953
Walter Routledge	South Africa	2	1935	1936
Lou Rowan	Australia	25	1963	1971
Joseph Rowbotham	England	1	1884	1884
Samar Roy	India	6	1961	1969
Langton Rusere†	Zimbabwe	8	2021	2024
W. B. Ryan	South Africa	2	1930	1931
Khwaja Saeed	Pakistan	5	1959	1961
Said Shah	Pakistan	1	1997	1997
Saleem Badar	Pakistan	5	1988	1998
T. M. Samarasinghe	Sri Lanka	7	1992	1993
Narayan Sane	India	2	1960	1960
Douglas Sang Hue	West Indies	31	1962	1981
B. Satyaji Rao	India	17	1961	1979
C. Saunders	South Africa	1	1928	1928
John Scott	Australia	10	1936	1947
George Searcy	Australia	1	1895	1895
**Sharfuddoula**	Bangladesh	24	2021	2026
Shakeel Khan	Pakistan	6	1983	2002
Shakoor Rana	Pakistan	18	1975	1996
Har Sharma	India	3	1974	1977
Raman Sharma	India	1	1994	1994
Virender Sharma†	India	4	2021	2022
George Sharp	England	15	1996	2002
Suresh Shastri	India	2	2007	2007
Bill Sheahan	Australia	2	1993	1994
David Shepherd	England	92	1985	2005
Mordecai Sherwin	England	1	1899	1899
Dick Shortt	New Zealand	9	1959	1973
Showkatur Rahman	Bangladesh	1	2001	2001
Shujauddin	Pakistan	22	1955	1978
G. L. Sickler	South Africa	7	1938	1948
Gamini Silva	Sri Lanka	3	2000	2005
Prasad Sinha	India	2	1948	1952
M. S. Sivasankariah	India	3	1975	1977
Jack Smart	England	4	1946	1947
John Smeaton	Australia	1	2001	2001
Douglas Smith	England	1	1914	1914
Tiger Smith	England	8	1933	1939
Frank Smith	England	5	1902	1910
Bill Smyth	Australia	4	1962	1966
Alfred Soames	South Africa	2	1899	1902
Tom Spencer	England	17	1954	1978
H. H. Stephenson	England	1	1880	1880
Alfred Street	England	7	1912	1926
James Street	England	1	1890	1890
M. G. Subramaniam	India	2	1983	1983
John Swift	Australia	8	1882	1887
Tariq Ata	Pakistan	1	1988	1988
Shavir Tarapore	India	4	2011	2011
Frank Tarrant	Australia	2	1933	1934
Simon Taufel	Australia	74	2000	2012
Ben Terry	England	2	1877	1877
Charles Thomas	South Africa	1	1892	1892
George Thompson	England	2	1923	1923
Bob Thoms	England	2	1880	1882
Russell Tiffin	Zimbabwe	44	1995	2009
Col Timmins	Australia	4	1989	1993
Eric Tindill	New Zealand	1	1959	1959
Valentine Titchmarsh	England	3	1899	1905
S. B. Tomkinson	New Zealand	2	1951	1955
Jack Tooher	Australia	1	1892	1892
Richard Torrance	New Zealand	1	1933	1933
Les Townsend	Australia	1	1959	1959
Norman Townsend	Australia	1	1972	1972
G. B. Treadwell	South Africa	4	1927	1930
**Rod Tucker**	Australia	102	2010	2026
Umar Khan	Pakistan	1	1969	1969
Srinivas Venkataraghavan	India	73	1993	2004
Gustave Verheyen	South Africa	1	1928	1928
P. W. Vidanagamage	Sri Lanka	4	1984	1987
M. G. Vijayasarathi	India	13	1951	1960
V. Vikramraju	India	2	1984	1986
B. Vine	New Zealand	1	1952	1952
C. F. Vyfhuis	West Indies	6	1974	1978
Billy Wade	South Africa	1	1970	1970
Walker Wainwright	England	1	1923	1923
Harold Walcott	West Indies	4	1948	1958
Fanny Walden	England	11	1934	1939
Edward Ward	West Indies	1	1935	1935
Albert Warner	South Africa	2	1970	1970
John Warner	South Africa	2	1962	1965
Robert Warton	England	2	1889	1889
Evan Watkin	New Zealand	3	1998	2009
George Watson	Australia	2	1911	1912
George Webb	England	3	1912	1912
Andrew Weekes	West Indies	4	1983	1990
Don Weser	Australia	3	1979	1980
John West	England	1	1886	1886
John Edward West	England	1	1905	1905
William West	England	9	1896	1912
**Alex Wharf**	England	16	2021	2026
Archibald White	England	8	1899	1912
Alan Whitehead	England	5	1982	1987
Rex Whitehead	Australia	4	1981	1982
Bill Whitridge	Australia	1	1892	1892
Udaya Wickramasinghe	Sri Lanka	3	1987	1997
Tyron Wijewardene	Sri Lanka	4	2001	2005
Peter Willey	England	25	1996	2003
A. P. Williams	Australia	1	1924	1924
George Williams	West Indies	1	1958	1958
Joel Wilson	West Indies	47	2015	2025
Paul Wilson	Australia	8	2019	2023
Raveendra Wimalasiri†	Sri Lanka	1	2023	2023
K. Woods	West Indies	1	1954	1954
Steve Woodward	New Zealand	24	1979	1991
Claud Woolley	England	1	1948	1948
Ron Wright	Australia	13	1948	1959
Arthur Wyeth	Australia	1	1931	1931
Ted Wykes	Australia	1	1962	1962
Asif Yaqoob†	Pakistan	3	2024	2025
Hugo Yarnold	England	3	1967	1968
Sailor Young	England	3	1924	1926
W. A. Young	Australia	1	1912	1912

== In-game changes ==
The figures above include the following occasions when an on-field umpire was replaced during a Test, (apart from Amiesh Saheba replacing Billy Doctrove for the 2nd Test between India and Pakistan at Kolkata in 2007, and Rod Tucker replacing Aleem Dar for the 2nd Test between England and Sri Lanka at Chester-le-Street in 2016).

- Three umpires were used for the 2nd Test between Australia and New Zealand at Hobart in 2001–02. Steve Davis was injured and was replaced on field by John Smeaton during the third day.
- Three umpires were used for the 2nd Test between South Africa and India at Durban in 2006–07. Mark Benson was ill and was replaced on field by Ian Howell during the third day.
- Three umpires were used for the 2nd Test between India and Pakistan at Kolkata in 2007–08. Billy Doctrove was ill and was replaced on field by Amiesh Saheba during the fourth day.
- Three umpires were used for the 2nd Test between New Zealand and India at Napier in 2008–09. Billy Doctrove was ill and was replaced on field by Evan Watkin on the third day.
- Three umpires were used for the 2nd Test between Australia and West Indies at Adelaide in 2009–10. Mark Benson was ill and was replaced on field by Asad Rauf on the second day.
- Three umpires were used for the 2nd Test between West Indies and New Zealand at Port of Spain in 2014. Rod Tucker was ill and was replaced on field by Richard Illingworth on the fourth day.
- Three umpires were used for the 2nd Test between England and Sri Lanka at Chester-le-Street in 2016. Aleem Dar was ill and was replaced on field by Rod Tucker on the fourth day.
- Three umpires were used for the 4th Test between India and England at Mumbai in 2016–17. Paul Reiffel was injured and was replaced on field by Marais Erasmus on the first day.
- Three umpires were used for the 1st Test between India and Sri Lanka at Kolkata in 2017–18. Richard Kettleborough was ill and was replaced on field by Joel Wilson on the third day.
- Three umpires were used for the 2nd Test between South Africa and Australia at Port Elizabeth in 2017–18. Chris Gaffaney was ill and was replaced on field by Sundaram Ravi on the second day.
- Three umpires were used for 2nd Test between Sri Lanka and Bangladesh, at Galle in 2025. Alex Wharf was ill and was replaced on-field by the reserve umpire Prageeth Rambukwella on the first day.

== Notes ==
NB.The umpires for the 1st Test, South Africa v England, 1895–96 are unknown.
