= South African cricket team in England in 1924 =

International cricket tour

The South African cricket team toured England in the 1924 season to play a five-match Test series against England.

England won the series 3–0 with 2 matches drawn.

== The South African squad ==
On 3 January 1924, the selectors named a 15-man squad for the tour of England. Billy Zulch was considered the most notable omission although he had only recently returned to playing cricket during the 1923–24 Currie Cup. Before leaving South Africa, captain Herbie Taylor indicated that Sid Pegler would be given a chance on the tour despite him not being in the original squad selection.

The squad set sail from Cape Town on 4 April aboard the Arundel Castle, arriving in Southampton on 21 April.

Name	Birth date	Domestic team	Batting Style	Bowling Style	Test caps
Batsmen
Herbie Taylor (c)	5 May 1889 (aged 34)	Natal	Right-handed	Right arm unknown	19
Bob Catterall	10 July 1900 (aged 23)	Rhodesia	Right-handed	Right arm medium	5
Mick Commaille (vc)	21 February 1883 (aged 41)	Western Province	Right-handed	—	5
Nummy Deane	21 July 1895 (aged 28)	Transvaal	Right-handed	—	0
Philip Hands	18 March 1890 (aged 34)	Western Province	Right-handed	Right arm unknown	6
George Hearne	27 March 1888 (aged 36)	South Western Districts	Right-handed	—	2
Dave Nourse	25 January 1879 (aged 45)	Natal	Left-handed	Left arm medium	40
Wicket-keepers
Fred Susskind	8 June 1891 (aged 32)	Transvaal	Right-handed	—	0
Tommy Ward	2 August 1887 (aged 36)	Transvaal	Right-handed	—	18
All-rounder
Jimmy Blanckenberg	31 December 1893 (aged 30)	Natal	Right-handed	Right arm medium	13
Bowlers
George Bissett	5 November 1905 (aged 18)	Griqualand West	Right-handed	Right arm fast	0
Claude Carter	23 April 1881 (aged 43)	Natal	Right-handed	Slow left arm orthodox	7
Cec Dixon	12 February 1891 (aged 33)	Transvaal	Right-handed	Right arm medium	1
Doug Meintjes	9 June 1890 (aged 33)	Transvaal	Right-handed	Right arm fast-medium	2
Buster Nupen	2 January 1902 (aged 22)	Transvaal	Right-handed	Right arm fast-medium	6
Sid Pegler	28 July 1888 (aged 35)	Transvaal	Right-handed	Right arm medium, Legbreak	11

- The ages and Test caps are as at the start of the tour (3 May 1924).

George Parker (24) also played three first-class matches (including the first two Tests) and Aubrey Faulkner (42) played one match, the Third Test. The manager was George Allsop, who had held the role on three previous tours of England.

== Test series summary ==
=== First Test ===
14–17 June 1924
(3-day match)
Scorecard

England	v	South Africa
438 (124 overs); JB Hobbs 76; GM Parker 6/152 (37 overs)		30 (12.3 overs); HW Taylor 7 AER Gilligan 6/7 (6.3 overs)
		390 (f/o) (143.4 overs); RH Catterall 120; AER Gilligan 5/83 (28 overs)

England won by an innings and 18 runs
Edgbaston, Birmingham
Umpires: HR Butt and W Reeves

- South Africa won the toss and elected to field.
- 15 June were taken as rest days.
- H Sutcliffe, APF Chapman, R Kilner, MW Tate and GEC Wood (all ENG), and MJ Susskind, HG Deane and GM Parker (all SA) made their Test debuts.
- Parker, an expatriate fast bowler from Cape Town then playing for Eccleshill in the Bradford League, was called up to strengthen the South African bowling and responded with six wickets.
- South Africa's score of 30 at Edgbaston is still the only completed innings in Test match history in which no batsman reached double figures.
- The 75 balls in the South African 1st innings is still the fewest balls in a completed Test match innings.

=== Second Test ===
28 June–1 July 1924
(3-day match)
Scorecard

South Africa	v	England
273 (116 overs); RH Catterall 120; RK Tyldesley 3/52 (24 overs)		531/2d (118 overs); JB Hobbs 211; GM Parker 2/121 (24 overs)
240 (123.4 overs); MJ Susskind 53; RK Tyldesley 3/50 (36 overs)

England won by an innings and 18 runs
Lord's, London
Umpires: F Chester and HI Young

- South Africa won the toss and elected to bat.
- 29 June was taken as a rest day.
- RK Tyldesley (ENG) made his Test debut.
- The England score of 531-2d is the highest Test innings in which all who batted scored at least a half-century.
- Parker ended his third and final first-class match as the only South African Test cricketer not to play first-class cricket in his own country.
- The first of only five occasions where a side has lost only two wickets while winning a Test match.

=== Third Test ===
12–15 July 1924
(3-day match)
Scorecard

England	v	South Africa
396 (116 overs); EH Hendren 132; SJ Pegler 4/116 (35 overs)		132 (51.3 overs); HW Taylor 59*; MW Tate 6/42 (17 overs)
60/1 (22.2 overs); H Sutcliffe 29*; J Blanckenberg 1/23 (10 overs)		323 (f/o) (127 overs); HW Taylor 56; RH Catterall 56; RK Tyldesley 3/63 (24 overs)

England won by 9 wickets
Headingley, Leeds
Umpires: W Reeves and AE Street

- England won the toss and elected to bat.
- 13 July was taken as a rest day.

=== Fourth Test ===
26–29 July 1924
(3-day match)
Scorecard

South Africa	v	England
116/4 (66.5 overs); TA Ward 50; MW Tate 3/34 (24 overs)

Match drawn
Old Trafford, Manchester
Umpires: HR Butt and AE Street

- South Africa won the toss and elected to bat.
- 27 July was taken as a rest day.
- There was no play on the second or third days.
- JCW MacBryan, G Geary and G Duckworth (all ENG) made their Test debuts.

=== Fifth Test ===
16–19 August 1924
(3-day match)
Scorecard

South Africa	v	England
342 (124 overs); RH Catterall 95; MW Tate 3/64 (29 overs)		421/8 (131 overs); EH Hendren 142; CP Carter 3/85 (23 overs)

Match drawn
The Oval, London
Umpires: HR Butt and F Chester

- South Africa won the toss and elected to bat.
- 17 August was taken as a rest day.
