= Australian cricket team in South Africa in 1966–67 =

International cricket tour

The Australia national cricket team toured South Africa from October 1966 to March 1967 and played a five-match Test series against the South African team. South Africa won the Test series 3–1. Australia were captained by Bob Simpson; South Africa by Peter van der Merwe.

== Australian team ==
- Bob Simpson (NSW) (captain)
- Gordon Becker (WA)
- Ian Chappell (SA)
- Bob Cowper (Vic)
- Neil Hawke (SA)
- Jim Hubble (WA)
- Bill Lawry (Vic)
- Graham McKenzie (WA)
- Johnny Martin (NSW)
- Ian Redpath (Vic)
- David Renneberg (NSW)
- Keith Stackpole (Vic)
- Brian Taber (NSW)
- Grahame Thomas (NSW)
- Tom Veivers (Qld)
- Graeme Watson (Vic)

Doug Walters withdrew from the tour party when conscripted for two years of National Service training, and was replaced by Watson.

== Test series summary ==
=== First Test ===
23–28 December 1966
(5-day match)
Scorecard

South Africa	v	Australia
199 (66.5 overs); DT Lindsay 69 (101); GD McKenzie 5/46 (21.5 overs)		325 (130.2 overs); WM Lawry 98; EJ Barlow 3/39 (17 overs)
620 (177.3 overs); DT Lindsay 182 (227); RB Simpson 2/66 (16.1 overs)		261 (117.5 overs); TR Veivers 55 (146); TL Goddard 6/53 (32.5 overs)

South Africa won by 233 runs
New Wanderers, Johannesburg
Umpires: LM Baxter and HC Kidson

- South Africa won the toss and elected to bat.
- 25 December was taken as a rest day.
- DA Renneberg and HB Taber (both AUS) made their Test debuts.

=== Second Test ===
31 December 1966–5 January 1967
(5-day match)
Scorecard

Australia	v	South Africa
542 (188.3 overs); RB Simpson 153 (353); EJ Barlow 5/85 (33.3 overs)		353 (127.1 overs); RG Pollock 209 (347); GD McKenzie 5/65 (33 overs)
180/4 (65.1 overs); IR Redpath 69*; TL Goddard 2/67 (29.1 overs)		367 (f/o) (166.3 overs); DT Lindsay 81 (130); GD McKenzie 3/67 (39.3 overs)

Australia won by 6 wickets
Newlands, Cape Town
Umpires: G Goldman and HC Kidson

- Australia won the toss and elected to bat.
- 1 January was taken as a rest day.
- GD Watson (AUS) made his Test debut.

=== Third Test ===
20–25 January 1967
(5-day match)
Scorecard

South Africa	v	Australia
300 (111 overs); DT Lindsay 137; RM Cowper 3/57 (37 overs)		147 (69 overs); WM Lawry 44; EJ Barlow 3/18 (11 overs)
185/2 (75 overs); RG Pollock 67* (155); RM Cowper 1/29 (17 overs)		334 (f/o) (160.1 overs); RB Simpson 94 (245); MJ Procter 4/71 (29.1 overs)

South Africa won by 8 wickets
Kingsmead, Durban
Umpires: JG Draper and HC Kidson

- Australia won the toss and elected to field.
- 22 January was taken as a rest day.
- MJ Procter and PHJ Trimborn (both SA) made their Test debuts.

=== Fourth Test ===
3–8 February 1967
(5-day match)
Scorecard

Australia	v	South Africa
143 (70.1 overs); RM Cowper 25 (60); MJ Procter 4/32 (18 overs)		332/9d (105 overs); DT Lindsay 131 (135); DA Renneberg 5/97 (25 overs)
148/8 (78.3 overs); IR Redpath 46 (125); TL Goddard 3/23 (16.3 overs)

Match drawn
New Wanderers, Johannesburg
Umpires: JG Draper and HC Kidson

- Australia won the toss and elected to bat.
- 5 February was taken as a rest day.
- There was no play on the fourth day.
- JH du Preez (SA) made his Test debut.

=== Fifth Test ===
24–28 February 1967
(5-day match)
Scorecard

Australia	v	South Africa
173 (74.1 overs); RM Cowper 60 (132); TL Goddard 3/13 (10 overs)		276 (116.3 overs); RG Pollock 105 (174); GD McKenzie 5/65 (35 overs)
278 (105.1 overs); RM Cowper 54; PHJ Trimborn 3/12 (10.1 overs)		179/3 (61.1 overs); TL Goddard 59; GD McKenzie 2/38 (17 overs)

South Africa won by 7 wickets
St George's Park, Port Elizabeth
Umpires: JG Draper and HC Kidson

- South Africa won the toss and elected to field.
- 26 February was taken as a rest day.
- The match was scheduled for five days but completed in four.
