= George Bissett (cricketer) =

South African cricketer (1905–1965)

George Findlay Knox Mathieson Bissett
Personal information
- Full name: George Finlay Knox Mathieson Bissett
- Born: 5 November 1905; Kimberley, Cape Colony
- Died: 14 November 1965 (aged 60); Botha's Hill, Natal, South Africa
- Batting: Right-handed
- Bowling: Right-arm fast
- Role: Bowler

International information
- National side: South Africa
- Test debut (cap 119): 31 December 1927 v England
- Last Test: 4 February 1928 v England

Domestic team information
- Years: Team
- 1922–1924: Griqualand West
- 1928: Western Province
- 1929: Transvaal

Career statistics
Competition	Test	First-class
Matches	4	21
Runs scored	38	294
Batting average	19.00	15.47
100s/50s	0/0	0/0
Top score	23	33
Balls bowled	989	3,317
Wickets	25	67
Bowling average	18.76	27.10
5 wickets in innings	2	5
10 wickets in match	0	0
Best bowling	7/29	7/29
Catches/stumpings	0/–	8/–
- Source: CricketArchive, 29 February 2012

George Finlay Bissett (5 November 1905 – 14 November 1965) was a South African cricketer who played in four Test matches in the 1927–28 season. He was born at Kimberley, Cape Province and died at Botha's Hill, Natal.

== Early cricket career ==
Bissett attended St Patrick’s Christian Brothers’ College, Kimberley, and grew to be five feet ten and a half inches tall. He was a right-handed lower-order batsman who could hit hard, a fine fieldsman and a right-arm fast bowler who was considered the fastest bowler in South Africa at the time. He had a spasmodic first-class cricket career extending over eight years and taking in three domestic South African teams plus a tour to England, but amounting to only 21 matches in all.

Bissett made his first-class debut in two matches for Griqualand West against Orange Free State in 1922–23 and in the second of them he took five first innings wickets for 38 runs in 10 overs. The following year he improved on those figures by taking six for 87 in Border's first innings. That led to his selection for the 1924 South African tour to England. The tour was not a success for Bissett. Played very sparingly in the early matches, he had run into some form by the end of June and took five second innings Hampshire wickets for 102 runs. But less than two weeks later he injured his foot bowling against Yorkshire and was unable to play again.

== Test cricket ==
Bissett then disappeared from first-class cricket for three-and-a-half years until he was a surprise selection for the second Test in the 1927–28 home series against England. England had won the first Test easily by 10 wickets; Bissett, who was playing second division league matches in Cape Town, was brought in to strengthen the bowling and was immediately successful, taking the first five wickets to fall and finished with five for 37. There were three further wickets in the second innings, though they came at greater cost. The Times report of the first day of the match detailed the circumstances of Bissett's selection: "Bissett was selected on the frail qualification of having taken seven wickets for 28 runs in a senior club match last week, this being the only glimpse of form which he has shown since he was selected to tour England with Taylor's team in 1924, when he proved to be a dismal failure." Despite Bissett's success, England still won the match, albeit by a narrower margin than the previous game.

The balance of power in the Test series was shifting and the next match was drawn, though Bissett failed to take any wickets. It shifted even further in the fourth game and South Africa won by four wickets. Bissett was partnered with the left-arm fast-medium bowler Alf Hall and they took all 10 wickets between then in England's first innings, with Bissett returning four for 43 and Hall six for 100. In the second innings, Bissett took four more wickets (for 70 runs) and Hall took three. The South African recovery was completed with a victory by eight wickets in the final Test of the series to level the rubber at two victories each, and again Bissett played a big part. He took two wickets in England's first innings when Buster Nupen was the main bowler, with five for 83. But in England's second innings, Bissett produced the best bowling of the series and of his career, taking seven for 29. The Times reported that Bissett, aided by a "stiff westerly wind", made the ball rise awkwardly and "demoralized the English batsmen with some great fast bowling". It went on: "At the end of the innings Bissett was carried shoulder-high by the crowd to the pavilion... It was officially announced that the ball with which Bissett accomplished his feat of taking seven English wickets for 29 runs would be suitably mounted and presented to him by the South African Cricket Association." Bissett was one of four players – the others were Nupen, Bob Catterall, and Ernest Tyldesley – who were invited to plant a tree on the boundary at the Kingsmead cricket ground after the match.

== End of cricket career ==
The rest of Bissett's career as a cricketer was anticlimax. Before the English team left South Africa, Bissett played a single first-class match for Western Province against them, and failed to take any wickets.

Bissett was unable "to make the trip" when South Africa toured England in 1929. He in fact played in only one further first-class match, a solitary appearance for Transvaal in the 1929–30 season in which he took two wickets in the first Natal innings, but did not bowl at all in the 97.3 overs of the second innings. The following year, he played in a non-first-class match for a Northern Rhodesia side against the 1930–31 England touring team, taking two wickets.

== Later life ==
Bissett became a teacher at Highbury Preparatory School in Durban, where he coached many of the school's sports teams.

== See also ==
- List of South Africa cricketers who have taken five-wicket hauls on Test debut
