= England cricket team Test results (1920–1939) =

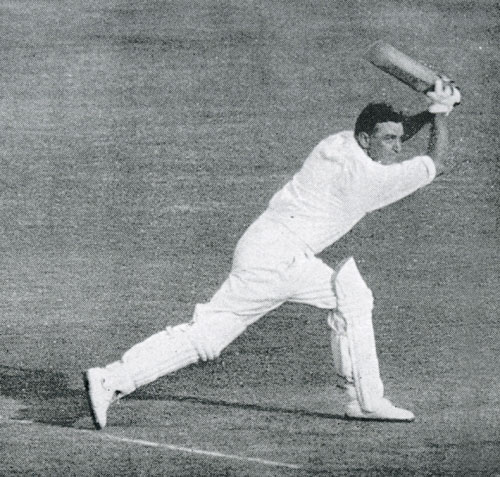
England's Wally Hammond was the leading run-scorer in Tests between 1920 and 1939.

The England cricket team represented England, Scotland and Wales in Test cricket. (Note: The England cricket team represented Scotland until 1992, when they left the UK Cricket Council, and later joined the International Cricket Council (ICC) as an independent member.) Between 1920 and 1939, when competitive cricket was interrupted by the Second World War, England played 120 Test matches, resulting in 41 victories, 49 draws and 30 defeats. During this period, England faced India, New Zealand and the West Indies for the first time in Test cricket, having previously only played against Australia and South Africa. The emergence of Don Bradman as an extraordinary batsman for Australia led to England employing Bodyline tactics during the 1932–33 Ashes tour of Australia. The tactic, which involved bowling fast deliveries aimed at the batsman, created antagonism between the two teams. The England team of the era featured some of the country's best batsmen; Jack Hobbs, Wally Hammond and Len Hutton were all included in the Cricinfo "all-time England XI" in 2009.

England faced Australia most frequently during this period—playing 49 matches against them—followed by South Africa. England won more matches than they lost against every team except Australia, against whom they won 15 matches and lost 22. They did not lose any matches against newcomers India or New Zealand, while against the West Indies they won 8 matches and lost 3. England won 14 matches by an innings, with their largest victory being by an innings and 579 runs against Australia during the 1938 Ashes series, the largest margin of victory by any team in Test cricket. Their largest victory by runs alone during this period was in the 1928–29 Ashes series against Australia, when they won by 675 runs, which is also an all-time record for any team, while they won by ten wickets on two occasions. Conversely, England suffered their largest defeat by runs alone, losing to Australia by 562 runs during the 1934 Ashes series, which ranks behind England's 675 runs victory as the second highest margin of victory by runs.

== Key ==
Key
Symbol	Meaning
No. (Eng.)	Match number for England (i.e. 150 was England's 150th Test match)
No. (Ove.)	Match number overall (i.e. 150 was the 150th Test match)
Opposition	The team England was playing against
Venue	The cricket ground where the match was played
(H)	Home ground
(A)	Away ground
Start date	Starting date of the Test match
Result	Result of the match for England
Series (result)	What series the match was part of, with the result listed in brackets; England's tally first (i.e. (2–1) means that England won two matches, and their opponents won one match)

== Matches ==
England Test cricket results between 1920 and 1939
No. (Eng.)	No. (Ove.)	Opposition	Venue	Start Date	Result	Series (result)
124	135	Australia	Sydney Cricket Ground, Sydney (A)	17 December 1920	Lost by 377 runs	1920–21 Ashes series (0–5)
125	136	Australia	Melbourne Cricket Ground, Melbourne (A)	31 December 1920	Lost by an innings and 91 runs	1920–21 Ashes series (0–5)
126	137	Australia	Adelaide Oval, Adelaide (A)	14 January 1921	Lost by 119 runs	1920–21 Ashes series (0–5)
127	138	Australia	Melbourne Cricket Ground, Melbourne (A)	11 February 1921	Lost by 8 wickets	1920–21 Ashes series (0–5)
128	139	Australia	Sydney Cricket Ground, Sydney (A)	25 February 1921	Lost by 9 wickets	1920–21 Ashes series (0–5)
129	140	Australia	Trent Bridge, Nottingham (H)	28 May 1921	Lost by 10 wickets	1921 Ashes series (0–3)
130	141	Australia	Lord's, London (H)	11 June 1921	Lost by 8 wickets	1921 Ashes series (0–3)
131	142	Australia	Headingley, Leeds (H)	2 July 1921	Lost by 219 runs	1921 Ashes series (0–3)
132	143	Australia	Old Trafford, Manchester (H)	23 July 1921	Match drawn	1921 Ashes series (0–3)
133	144	Australia	The Oval, London (H)	13 August 1921	Match drawn	1921 Ashes series (0–3)
134	148	South Africa	Old Wanderers, Johannesburg (A)	23 December 1922	Lost by 168 runs	English cricket team in South Africa in 1922–23 (2–1)
135	149	South Africa	Newlands Cricket Ground, Cape Town (A)	1 January 1923	Won by 1 wicket	English cricket team in South Africa in 1922–23 (2–1)
136	150	South Africa	Kingsmead, Durban (A)	18 January 1923	Match drawn	English cricket team in South Africa in 1922–23 (2–1)
137	151	South Africa	Old Wanderers, Johannesburg (A)	9 February 1923	Match drawn	English cricket team in South Africa in 1922–23 (2–1)
138	152	South Africa	Kingsmead, Durban (A)	16 February 1923	Won by 109 runs	English cricket team in South Africa in 1922–23 (2–1)
139	153	South Africa	Edgbaston, Birmingham (H)	14 June 1924	Won by an innings and 18 runs	South African cricket team in England in 1924 (3–0)
140	154	South Africa	Lord's, London (H)	28 June 1924	Won by an innings and 18 runs	South African cricket team in England in 1924 (3–0)
141	155	South Africa	Headingley, Leeds (H)	12 July 1924	Won by 9 wickets	South African cricket team in England in 1924 (3–0)
142	156	South Africa	Old Trafford, Manchester (H)	26 July 1924	Match drawn	South African cricket team in England in 1924 (3–0)
143	157	South Africa	The Oval, London (H)	16 August 1924	Match drawn	South African cricket team in England in 1924 (3–0)
144	158	Australia	Sydney Cricket Ground, Sydney (A)	19 December 1924	Lost by 193 runs	1924–25 Ashes series (1–4)
145	159	Australia	Melbourne Cricket Ground, Melbourne (A)	1 January 1925	Lost by 81 runs	1924–25 Ashes series (1–4)
146	160	Australia	Adelaide Oval, Adelaide (A)	16 January 1925	Lost by 11 runs	1924–25 Ashes series (1–4)
147	161	Australia	Melbourne Cricket Ground, Melbourne (A)	13 February 1925	Won by an innings and 29 runs	1924–25 Ashes series (1–4)
148	162	Australia	Sydney Cricket Ground, Sydney (A)	27 February 1925	Lost by 307 runs	1924–25 Ashes series (1–4)
149	163	Australia	Trent Bridge, Nottingham (H)	12 June 1926	Match drawn	1926 Ashes series (1–0)
150	164	Australia	Lord's, London (H)	26 June 1926	Match drawn	1926 Ashes series (1–0)
151	165	Australia	Headingley, Leeds (H)	10 July 1926	Match drawn	1926 Ashes series (1–0)
152	166	Australia	Old Trafford, Manchester (H)	24 July 1926	Match drawn	1926 Ashes series (1–0)
153	167	Australia	The Oval, London (H)	14 August 1926	Won by 289 runs	1926 Ashes series (1–0)
154	168	South Africa	Old Wanderers, Johannesburg (A)	24 December 1927	Won by 10 wickets	English cricket team in South Africa in 1927–28 (2–2)
155	169	South Africa	Newlands Cricket Ground, Cape Town (A)	31 December 1927	Won by 87 runs	English cricket team in South Africa in 1927–28 (2–2)
156	170	South Africa	Kingsmead, Durban (A)	21 January 1928	Match drawn	English cricket team in South Africa in 1927–28 (2–2)
157	171	South Africa	Old Wanderers, Johannesburg (A)	28 January 1928	Lost by 4 wickets	English cricket team in South Africa in 1927–28 (2–2)
158	172	South Africa	Kingsmead, Durban (A)	4 February 1928	Lost by 8 wickets	English cricket team in South Africa in 1927–28 (2–2)
159	173	West Indies	Lord's, London (H)	23 June 1928	Won by an innings and 58 runs	West Indian cricket team in England in 1928 (3–0)
160	174	West Indies	Old Trafford, Manchester (H)	21 July 1928	Won by an innings and 30 runs	West Indian cricket team in England in 1928 (3–0)
161	175	West Indies	The Oval, London (H)	11 August 1928	Won by an innings and 71 runs	West Indian cricket team in England in 1928 (3–0)
162	176	Australia	Brisbane Exhibition Ground, Brisbane (A)	30 November 1928	Won by 675 runs	1928–29 Ashes series (4–1)
163	177	Australia	Sydney Cricket Ground, Sydney (A)	14 December 1928	Won by 8 wickets	1928–29 Ashes series (4–1)
164	178	Australia	Melbourne Cricket Ground, Melbourne (A)	29 December 1928	Won by 3 wickets	1928–29 Ashes series (4–1)
165	179	Australia	Adelaide Oval, Adelaide (A)	1 February 1929	Won by 12 runs	1928–29 Ashes series (4–1)
166	180	Australia	Melbourne Cricket Ground, Melbourne (A)	8 March 1929	Lost by 5 wickets	1928–29 Ashes series (4–1)
167	181	South Africa	Edgbaston, Birmingham (H)	15 June 1929	Match drawn	South African cricket team in England in 1929 (2–0)
168	182	South Africa	Lord's, London (H)	29 June 1929	Match drawn	South African cricket team in England in 1929 (2–0)
169	183	South Africa	Headingley, Leeds (H)	13 July 1929	Won by 5 wickets	South African cricket team in England in 1929 (2–0)
170	184	South Africa	Old Trafford, Manchester (H)	27 July 1929	Won by an innings and 32 runs	South African cricket team in England in 1929 (2–0)
171	185	South Africa	The Oval, London (H)	17 August 1929	Match drawn	South African cricket team in England in 1929 (2–0)
172	186	New Zealand	Lancaster Park, Christchurch (A)	10 January 1930 (Note: Two England cricket teams toured during the English winter of 1929–30; both New Zealand and the West Indies had recently become eligible to play Test cricket, and English cricket authorities wanted to visit both as soon as possible. Due to other commitments, they decided the best way to achieve this was to send a team to each at the same time. As a result, they began a Test match on 10 January 1930 in New Zealand, and 11 January in the West Indies, and a little later had concurrent matches once again, with Tests in both places on 21 February 1930.)	Won by 8 wickets	English cricket team in New Zealand in 1929–30 (1–0)
173	187	West Indies	Kensington Oval, Bridgetown (A)	11 January 1930	Match drawn	English cricket team in the West Indies in 1929–30 (1–1)
174	188	New Zealand	Basin Reserve, Wellington (A)	24 January 1930	Match drawn	English cricket team in New Zealand in 1929–30 (1–0)
175	189	West Indies	Queen's Park Oval, Port of Spain (A)	1 February 1930	Won by 167 runs	English cricket team in the West Indies in 1929–30 (1–1)
176	190	New Zealand	Eden Park, Auckland (A)	14 February 1930	Match drawn	English cricket team in New Zealand in 1929–30 (1–0)
177	191	New Zealand	Eden Park, Auckland (A)	21 February 1930	Match drawn	English cricket team in New Zealand in 1929–30 (1–0)
178	192	West Indies	Bourda, Georgetown (A)	21 February 1930	Lost by 289 runs	English cricket team in the West Indies in 1929–30 (1–1)
179	193	West Indies	Sabina Park, Kingston (A)	3 April 1930	Match drawn	English cricket team in the West Indies in 1929–30 (1–1)
180	194	Australia	Trent Bridge, Nottingham (H)	13 June 1930	Won by 93 runs	1930 Ashes series (1–2)
181	195	Australia	Lord's, London (H)	27 June 1930	Lost by 7 wickets	1930 Ashes series (1–2)
182	196	Australia	Headingley, Leeds (H)	11 July 1930	Match drawn	1930 Ashes series (1–2)
183	197	Australia	Old Trafford, Manchester (H)	25 July 1930	Match drawn	1930 Ashes series (1–2)
184	198	Australia	The Oval, London (H)	16 August 1930	Lost by an innings and 39 runs	1930 Ashes series (1–2)
185	200	South Africa	Old Wanderers, Johannesburg (A)	24 December 1930	Lost by 28 runs	English cricket team in South Africa in 1930–31 (0–1)
186	202	South Africa	Newlands Cricket Ground, Cape Town (A)	1 January 1931	Match drawn	English cricket team in South Africa in 1930–31 (0–1)
187	204	South Africa	Kingsmead, Durban (A)	16 January 1931	Match drawn	English cricket team in South Africa in 1930–31 (0–1)
188	206	South Africa	Old Wanderers, Johannesburg (A)	13 February 1931	Match drawn	English cricket team in South Africa in 1930–31 (0–1)
189	207	South Africa	Kingsmead, Durban (A)	21 February 1931	Match drawn	English cricket team in South Africa in 1930–31 (0–1)
190	209	New Zealand	Lord's, London (H)	27 June 1931	Match drawn	New Zealand cricket team in England in 1931 (1–0)
191	210	New Zealand	The Oval, London (H)	29 July 1931	Won by an innings and 26 runs	New Zealand cricket team in England in 1931 (1–0)
192	211	New Zealand	Old Trafford, Manchester (H)	15 August 1931	Match drawn	New Zealand cricket team in England in 1931 (1–0)
193	219	India	Lord's, London (H)	25 June 1932	Won by 158 runs	Indian cricket team in England in 1932 (1–0)
194	220	Australia	Sydney Cricket Ground, Sydney (A)	2 December 1932	Won by 10 wickets	1932–33 Ashes series (4–1)
195	221	Australia	Melbourne Cricket Ground, Melbourne (A)	30 December 1932	Lost by 111 runs	1932–33 Ashes series (4–1)
196	222	Australia	Adelaide Oval, Adelaide (A)	13 January 1933	Won by 338 runs	1932–33 Ashes series (4–1)
197	223	Australia	The Gabba, Brisbane (A)	10 February 1933	Won by 6 wickets	1932–33 Ashes series (4–1)
198	224	Australia	Sydney Cricket Ground, Sydney (A)	23 February 1933	Won by 8 wickets	1932–33 Ashes series (4–1)
199	225	New Zealand	Lancaster Park, Christchurch (A)	24 March 1933	Match drawn	English cricket team in New Zealand in 1932–33 (0–0)
200	226	New Zealand	Eden Park, Auckland (A)	31 March 1933	Match drawn	English cricket team in New Zealand in 1932–33 (0–0)
201	227	West Indies	Lord's, London (H)	24 June 1933	Won by an innings and 27 runs	West Indian cricket team in England in 1933 (2–0)
202	228	West Indies	Old Trafford, Manchester (H)	22 July 1933	Match drawn	West Indian cricket team in England in 1933 (2–0)
203	229	West Indies	The Oval, London (H)	12 August 1933	Won by an innings and 17 runs	West Indian cricket team in England in 1933 (2–0)
204	230	India	Wankhede Stadium, Mumbai (A)	15 December 1933	Won by 9 wickets	English cricket team in India in 1933–34 (2–0)
205	231	India	Eden Gardens, Calcutta (A)	5 January 1934	Match drawn	English cricket team in India in 1933–34 (2–0)
206	232	India	M. A. Chidambaram Stadium, Chennai (A)	10 February 1934	Won by 202 runs	English cricket team in India in 1933–34 (2–0)
207	233	Australia	Trent Bridge, Nottingham (H)	8 June 1934	Lost by 238 runs	1934 Ashes series (1–2)
208	234	Australia	Lord's, London (H)	22 June 1934	Won by an innings and 38 runs	1934 Ashes series (1–2)
209	235	Australia	Old Trafford, Manchester (H)	6 July 1934	Match drawn	1934 Ashes series (1–2)
210	236	Australia	Headingley, Leeds (H)	20 July 1934	Match drawn	1934 Ashes series (1–2)
211	237	Australia	The Oval, London (H)	18 August 1934	Lost by 562 runs	1934 Ashes series (1–2)
212	238	West Indies	Kensington Oval, Bridgetown (A)	8 January 1935	Won by 4 wickets	English cricket team in the West Indies in 1934–35 (1–2)
213	239	West Indies	Queen's Park Oval, Port of Spain (A)	24 January 1935	Lost by 217 runs	English cricket team in the West Indies in 1934–35 (1–2)
214	240	West Indies	Bourda, Georgetown (A)	14 February 1935	Match drawn	English cricket team in the West Indies in 1934–35 (1–2)
215	241	West Indies	Sabina Park, Kingston (A)	14 March 1935	Lost by an innings and 161 runs	English cricket team in the West Indies in 1934–35 (1–2)
216	242	South Africa	Trent Bridge, Nottingham (H)	15 June 1935	Match drawn	South African cricket team in England in 1935 (0–1)
217	243	South Africa	Lord's, London (H)	29 June 1935	Lost by 157 runs	South African cricket team in England in 1935 (0–1)
218	244	South Africa	Headingley, Leeds (H)	13 July 1935	Match drawn	South African cricket team in England in 1935 (0–1)
219	245	South Africa	Old Trafford, Manchester (H)	27 July 1935	Match drawn	South African cricket team in England in 1935 (0–1)
220	246	South Africa	The Oval, London (H)	17 August 1935	Match drawn	South African cricket team in England in 1935 (0–1)
221	252	India	Lord's, London (H)	27 June 1936	Won by 9 wickets	Indian cricket team in England in 1936 (2–0)
222	253	India	Old Trafford, Manchester (H)	25 July 1936	Match drawn	Indian cricket team in England in 1936 (2–0)
223	254	India	The Oval, London (H)	15 August 1936	Won by 9 wickets	Indian cricket team in England in 1936 (2–0)
224	255	Australia	The Gabba, Brisbane (A)	4 December 1936	Won by 322 runs	1936–37 Ashes series (2–3)
225	256	Australia	Sydney Cricket Ground, Sydney (A)	18 December 1936	Won by an innings and 2 runs	1936–37 Ashes series (2–3)
226	257	Australia	Melbourne Cricket Ground, Melbourne (A)	1 January 1937	Lost by 365 runs	1936–37 Ashes series (2–3)
227	258	Australia	Adelaide Oval, Adelaide (A)	29 January 1937	Lost by 148 runs	1936–37 Ashes series (2–3)
228	259	Australia	Melbourne Cricket Ground, Melbourne (A)	26 February 1937	Lost by an innings and 200 runs	1936–37 Ashes series (2–3)
229	260	New Zealand	Lord's, London (H)	26 June 1937	Match drawn	New Zealand cricket team in England in 1937 (1–0)
230	261	New Zealand	Old Trafford, Manchester (H)	24 July 1937	Won by 130 runs	New Zealand cricket team in England in 1937 (1–0)
231	262	New Zealand	The Oval, London (H)	14 August 1937	Match drawn	New Zealand cricket team in England in 1937 (1–0)
232	263	Australia	Trent Bridge, Nottingham (H)	10 June 1938	Match drawn	1938 Ashes series (1–1)
233	264	Australia	Lord's, London (H)	24 June 1938	Match drawn	1938 Ashes series (1–1)
234	265	Australia	Headingley, Leeds (H)	22 July 1938	Lost by 5 wickets	1938 Ashes series (1–1)
235	266	Australia	The Oval, London (H)	20 August 1938	Won by an innings and 579 runs	1938 Ashes series (1–1)
236	267	South Africa	Old Wanderers, Johannesburg (A)	24 December 1938	Match drawn	English cricket team in South Africa in 1938–39 (1–0)
237	268	South Africa	Newlands Cricket Ground, Cape Town (A)	31 December 1938	Match drawn	English cricket team in South Africa in 1938–39 (1–0)
238	269	South Africa	Kingsmead, Durban (A)	20 January 1939	Won by an innings and 13 runs	English cricket team in South Africa in 1938–39 (1–0)
239	270	South Africa	Old Wanderers, Johannesburg (A)	18 February 1939	Match drawn	English cricket team in South Africa in 1938–39 (1–0)
240	271	South Africa	Kingsmead, Durban (A)	3 March 1939	Match drawn	English cricket team in South Africa in 1938–39 (1–0)
241	272	West Indies	Lord's, London (H)	24 June 1939	Won by 8 wickets	West Indian cricket team in England in 1939 (1–0)
242	273	West Indies	Old Trafford, Manchester (H)	22 July 1939	Match drawn	West Indian cricket team in England in 1939 (1–0)
243	274	West Indies	The Oval, London (H)	19 August 1939	Match drawn	West Indian cricket team in England in 1939 (1–0)

== Summary ==
Team	Total matches					Home matches					Away matches				
Team	Mat	Won	Lost	Draw	W/L	Mat	Won	Lost	Draw	W/L	Mat	Won	Lost	Draw	W/L
Australia	49	15	22	12	0.681	24	4	8	12	0.500	25	11	14	0	0.785
India	7	5	0	2	–	4	3	0	1	–	3	2	0	1	–
New Zealand	12	3	0	9	–	6	2	0	4	–	6	1	0	5	–
South Africa	35	10	5	20	2.000	15	5	1	9	5.000	20	5	4	11	1.250
West Indies	17	8	3	6	2.666	9	6	0	3	–	8	2	3	3	0.666
Total	120	41	30	49	1.366	58	20	9	29	2.222	62	21	21	20	1.000
