= Australian cricket team in England in 1926 =

International cricket tour

England won the 1926 Ashes series against Australia, winning the last Test of the series after the first four matches were drawn.

== Test series summary ==
=== First Test ===
12–15 June 1926
(3-day match)
Scorecard

England	v	Australia
32/0 (17.2 overs); JB Hobbs 19*

Match drawn
Trent Bridge, Nottingham
Umpires: RD Burrows and F Chester

- England won the toss and elected to bat.
- 13 June was taken as a rest day.
- There was no play on the second or third days.
- CF Root (ENG) and WM Woodfull (AUS) made their Test debuts.

=== Second Test ===
26–29 June 1926
(3-day match)
Scorecard

Australia	v	England
383 (154.5 overs); W Bardsley 193*; R Kilner 4/70 (34.5 overs)		475/3d (168 overs); EH Hendren 127*; J Ryder 1/70 (25 overs)
194/5 (88 overs); CG Macartney 133*; CF Root 2/40 (19 overs)

Match drawn
Lord's, London
Umpires: LC Braund and AE Street

- Australia won the toss and elected to bat.
- 27 June was taken as a rest day.
- H Larwood (ENG) made his Test debut.

England's top five batsmen all passed 50 in their innings.

=== Third Test ===
10–13 July 1926
(3-day match)
Scorecard

Australia	v	England
494 (165 overs); CG Macartney 151; MW Tate 4/99 (51 overs)		294 (128 overs); GG Macaulay 76; CV Grimmett 5/88 (39 overs)
		254/3 (f/o) (86 overs); H Sutcliffe 94; CV Grimmett 2/59 (29 overs)

Match drawn
Headingley, Leeds
Umpires: HR Butt and W Reeves

- England won the toss and elected to field.
- 11 July was taken as a rest day.

=== Fourth Test ===
24–27 July 1926
(3-day match)
Scorecard

Australia	v	England
335 (150.2 overs); WM Woodfull 117; CF Root 4/84 (52 overs)		305/5 (125 overs); GE Tyldesley 74; AA Mailey 3/87 (27 overs)

Match drawn
Old Trafford, Manchester
Umpires: H Chidgey and HI Young

- Australia won the toss and elected to bat.
- 25 July was taken as a rest day.
- There were only 1.4 overs bowled on the first day.

=== Fifth Test ===
14–18 August 1926
(Timeless Test)
Scorecard

England	v	Australia
280 (95.5 overs); H Sutcliffe 76; AA Mailey 6/138 (33.5 overs)		302 (152.1 overs); JM Gregory 73; MW Tate 3/40 (37.1 overs)
436 (182.5 overs); H Sutcliffe 161; CV Grimmett 3/108 (55 overs)		125 (52.3 overs); WAS Oldfield 23; W Rhodes 4/44 (20 overs)

England won by 289 runs
The Oval, London
Umpires: F Chester and HI Young

- England won the toss and elected to bat.
- 15 August was taken as a rest day.
- The match was completed in four days.

England regained the Ashes by winning the final match. Because the series was at stake, the match was to be "timeless", i.e. played to a finish. Australia had a narrow first innings lead of 22. Jack Hobbs and Herbert Sutcliffe took the score to 49–0 at the end of the second day, a lead of 27. Heavy rain fell overnight, and next day the pitch soon developed into a traditional sticky wicket. England seemed certain to be bowled out cheaply and to lose the match. In spite of the very difficult batting conditions, however, Hobbs and Sutcliffe took their partnership to 172 before Hobbs was out for exactly 100. Sutcliffe went on to make 161 and in the end England won the game comfortably.

== Ceylon ==
As on some previous visits to England, the Australian team had a stopover en route in Colombo and played a one-day single-innings match against the Ceylon national team which at that time did not have first-class status. The Australians won by 37 runs.

== Annual reviews ==
- Wisden Cricketers' Almanack 1927
