= International cricket in 1930–31 =

International cricket season

The 1930–31 international cricket season was from September 1930 to April 1931.

== Season overview ==
International tours
Start date	Home team	Away team	Results [Matches]			
Start date	Home team	Away team	Test	ODI	FC	LA
11 December 1930	Ceylon	Vizianagram's	—	—	0–1 [3]	—
12 December 1930	Australia	West Indies	4–1 [5]	—	—	—
24 December 1930	South Africa	England	1–0 [5]	—	—	—

== December ==
=== Vizianagram's XI in Ceylon ===
First-class series
No.	Date	Home captain	Away captain	Venue	Result
Match 1	11–13 December	T Cuming	Maharaj Kumar of Vizianagram	Victoria Park, Colombo	Vizianagram's XI by an innings and 259 runs
Match 2	18–20 December	Churchill Gunasekara	Maharaj Kumar of Vizianagram	Victoria Park, Colombo	Marylebone by an innings and 33 runs
Match 3	27–30 December	Churchill Gunasekara	Maharaj Kumar of Vizianagram	Victoria Park, Colombo	Marylebone by an innings and 33 runs

=== West Indies in Australia ===
Test series
No.	Date	Home captain	Away captain	Venue	Result
Test 199	12–16 December	Bill Woodfull	Jackie Grant	Adelaide Oval, Adelaide	Australia by 10 wickets
Test 201	1–5 January	Bill Woodfull	Jackie Grant	Sydney Cricket Ground, Sydney	Australia by an innings and 172 runs
Test 203	16–20 January	Bill Woodfull	Jackie Grant	Exhibition Ground, Brisbane	Australia by an innings and 217 runs
Test 205	13–14 February	Bill Woodfull	Jackie Grant	Melbourne Cricket Ground, Melbourne	Australia by an innings and 122 runs
Test 208	27 Feb–4 March	Bill Woodfull	Jackie Grant	Sydney Cricket Ground, Sydney	West Indies by 30 runs

=== England in South Africa ===
Test series
No.	Date	Home captain	Away captain	Venue	Result
Test 200	24–27 December	Buster Nupen	Percy Chapman	Old Wanderers, Johannesburg	South Africa by 28 runs
Test 202	1–5 January	Nummy Deane	Percy Chapman	Newlands, Cape Town	Match drawn
Test 204	16–20 January	Nummy Deane	Percy Chapman	Kingsmead, Durban	Match drawn
Test 206	13–17 February	Jock Cameron	Percy Chapman	Old Wanderers, Johannesburg	Match drawn
Test 207	21–25 February	Jock Cameron	Percy Chapman	Kingsmead, Durban	Match drawn
