= George M. Parker =

George M. Parker may refer to:

- George Parker (cricketer) (George Macdonald Parker, 1899–1969), South African cricketer
- George M. Parker (general) (1889–1968), United States Army general
