= International cricket in 1927–28 =

International cricket season

The 1927–28 international cricket season was from September 1927 to April 1928.

== Season overview ==
International tours
Start date	Home team	Away team	Results [Matches]			
Start date	Home team	Away team	Test	ODI	FC	LA
28 October 1927	Australia	New Zealand	—	—	1–0 [1]	—
24 December 1927	South Africa	England	2–2 [5]	—	—	—
9 February 1928	Jamaica	England	—	—	2–0 [3]	—
24 March 1928	New Zealand	Australia	—	—	0–1 [2]	—

== October ==
=== New Zealand in Australia ===
First-class match
No.	Date	Home captain	Away captain	Venue	Result
Match	29–31 October	(New South Wales) Alan Kippax	Tom Lowry	Sydney Cricket Ground, Sydney	New South Wales by 10 wickets

== December ==
=== England in South Africa ===
Test series
No.	Date	Home captain	Away captain	Venue	Result
Test 168	24–27 December	Nummy Deane	Rony Stanyforth	Old Wanderers, Johannesburg	England by 10 wickets
Test 169	31 Dec–4 January	Nummy Deane	Rony Stanyforth	Newlands, Cape Town	England by 87 runs
Test 170	21–25 January	Nummy Deane	Rony Stanyforth	Kingsmead, Durban	Match drawn
Test 171	28 Jan–1 February	Nummy Deane	Rony Stanyforth	Old Wanderers, Johannesburg	South Africa by 4 wickets
Test 172	4–8 February	Nummy Deane	Rony Stanyforth	Kingsmead, Durban	South Africa by 8 wickets

== February ==
=== England in Jamaica ===
First-class series
No.	Date	Home captain	Away captain	Venue	Result
Match 1	9–13 February	Karl Nunes	Lionel Tennyson	Sabina Park, Kingston	Jamaica by 218 runs
Match 2	18–22 February	Karl Nunes	Lionel Tennyson	Melbourne Park, Kingston	Jamaica by an innings and 98 runs
Match 3	28 Feb–3 March	Karl Nunes	Lionel Tennyson	Sabina Park, Kingston	Match drawn

== March ==
=== Australia in New Zealand ===
First-class Series
No.	Date	Home captain	Away captain	Venue	Result
Match 1	24–27 March	Tom Lowry	Vic Richardson	Eden Park, Auckland	Match drawn
Match 2	10–13 January	Tom Lowry	Vic Richardson	Carisbrook, Dunedin	Australia by 7 wickets
