= International cricket in 1929 =

International cricket season

The 1929 International cricket season was from April 1929 to August 1929.

== Season overview ==
International tours
Start date	Home team	Away team	Results [Matches]			
Start date	Home team	Away team	Test	ODI	FC	LA
8 June 1929	England	England Rest	—	—	0–0 [1]	—
15 June 1929	England	South Africa	2–0 [5]	—	—	—
6 July 1929	Ireland	Scotland	—	—	0–1 [1]	—

== June ==
=== Test Trial in England ===
Three-day match
No.	Date	Home captain	Away captain	Venue	Result
Match	8–11 June	Not mentioned	Not mentioned	Lord's, London	Match drawn

=== South Africa in England ===
Test series
No.	Date	Home captain	Away captain	Venue	Result
Test 181	15–18 June	Jack White	Nummy Deane	Edgbaston Cricket Ground, Birmingham	Match drawn
Test 181	29 Jun–2 July	Jack White	Nummy Deane	Lord's, London	Match drawn
Test 183	13–16 July	Jack White	Nummy Deane	Headingley Cricket Ground, Leeds	England by 5 wickets
Test 184	27–30 July	Arthur Carr	Nummy Deane	Old Trafford Cricket Ground, Manchester	England by an innings and 32 runs
Test 185	17–20 August	Arthur Carr	Nummy Deane	Kennington Oval, London	Match drawn

== July ==
=== Scotland in Ireland ===
Three-day Match
No.	Date	Home captain	Away captain	Venue	Result
Match	6–9 July	Not mentioned	Not mentioned	College Park, Dublin	Scotland by 9 wickets
