= Fred Payne =

Fred Payne may refer to:

- Fred Payne (baseball) (1880–1954), Major League Baseball player for the Detroit Tigers and Chicago White Sox
- Frederick Payne of the Payne Brothers pantomime act
- Frederick G. Payne (1904–1978), U.S. politician
- Frederick Huff Payne (1876–1960), United States Assistant Secretary of War
- Fred Payne (footballer) (1927–2025), Australian rules footballer
- Fred Payne (actor), British actor in Nuts and Wine
- Frederick Payne (umpire) (1908–1992), South African cricket umpire
- Frederick R. Payne Jr. (1911–2015), American Marine Corps general

== See also ==
- Frederick William Payn (1873–1908), British amateur tennis player
- Freda Payne (born 1942), American singer and actress
