= Badley (surname) =

Badley is an English-language surname. Notable people with the surname include:

- Jack Badley, West Indian cricket umpire
- John Badley (surgeon) (1783–1870), surgeon of Dudley, F.R.C.S. Medical pioneer
- John Haden Badley (1865–1967) educator, founder (1893) and Headmaster (1893–1935) of Bedales School
