= Basil Vine =

New Zealand cricket umpire

Personal information
- Full name: Basil William Vine
- Born: 1908; Wellington, New Zealand
- Died: 2 November 1965 (aged 56–57); Christchurch, New Zealand

Umpiring information
- Tests umpired: 1 (1952)
- Source: Cricinfo, 16 July 2013

Basil Vine (1908 – 2 November 1965) was a New Zealand cricket umpire. He stood in one Test match, New Zealand vs. West Indies, in 1952.

== See also ==
- List of Test cricket umpires
- West Indian cricket team in New Zealand in 1951–52
