= West Indian cricket team in New Zealand in 1951–52 =

International cricket tour

	New Zealand	West Indies
- Dates: 2 – 26 February 1952
Captains	Bert Sutcliffe	John Goddard

Test series
- Result: West Indies won the 2-match series 1–0
Most runs	Verdun Scott (158)	Frank Worrell (233)
Most wickets	Tom Burtt (8)	Sonny Ramadhin (12)

The West Indies cricket team toured New Zealand in February 1952 and played a two-match Test series against the New Zealand national cricket team. West Indies won the series 1–0 with one match drawn. The West Indian team came directly from Australia, where they had played a five-Test series.

== Test series summary ==
=== First Test ===
8–12 February 1952
Scorecard

New Zealand	v	West Indies
236 (119.4 overs); VJ Scott 45; B Sutcliffe 45; S Ramadhin 5/86 (36.4 overs)		287 (97.2 overs); FMM Worrell 71; TB Burtt 5/69 (29.2 overs)
189 (114.2 overs); FB Smith 37; S Ramadhin 4/39 (38.2 overs)		142/5 (59 overs); FMM Worrell 62*; TB Burtt 2/37 (16 overs)

West Indies won by 5 wickets
Lancaster Park, Christchurch
Umpires: MF Pengelly and BW Vine

- New Zealand won the toss and elected to bat.
- RWG Emery and DD Beard (all NZ) made their Test debuts.

=== Second Test ===
15–19 February 1952
Scorecard

West Indies	v	New Zealand
546/6d (159.4 overs); JB Stollmeyer 152; RWG Emery 2/52 (7.4 overs)		160 (99.4 overs); VJ Scott 84; AL Valentine 3/29 (34.4 overs)
		17/1 (f/o) (17 overs); RWG Emery 8 DS Atkinson 1/4 (8 overs)

Match drawn
Eden Park, Auckland
Umpires: JC Harris and TM Pearce

- New Zealand won the toss and elected to field.
- 17 February was taken as a rest day
- There was no play on the final day.
- JG Leggat (NZ) made his Test debut.
