= George Parker (cricketer) =

South African cricketer

Personal information
- Full name: George Macdonald Parker
- Born: 27 May 1899; Cape Town, Cape Colony
- Died: 1 May 1969 (aged 69); Thredbo, New South Wales, Australia
- Batting: Right-handed
- Bowling: Right-arm fast

International information
- National side: South Africa
- Test debut: 14 June 1924 v England
- Last Test: 28 June 1924 v England

Career statistics
Competition	Test	First-class
Matches	2	3
Runs scored	3	3
Batting average	1.50	1.50
100s/50s	0/0	0/0
Top score	2*	2*
Balls bowled	366	462
Wickets	8	12
Bowling average	34.12	25.58
5 wickets in innings	1	1
10 wickets in match	0	0
Best bowling	6/152	6/152
Catches/stumpings	0/–	0/–
- Source: Cricinfo, 14 November 2022

George Macdonald Parker (27 May 1899 – 1 May 1969) was a South African cricketer who played in two Test matches in 1924.

Parker is unusual in that two of the three first-class matches he ever played were Tests. A fast bowler, he was qualified for South Africa through having been born in Cape Town, but he played almost all of his cricket in England in the Bradford League. He was not originally in the 1924 team to England. However, with bowlers possessing a high reputation on matting, like Blanckenberg and Nupen, failing completely on English turf wickets, Parker was called in to reinforce the side for the match against Oxford University. Although play lasted only five hours due to rain, Parker took four wickets for 34 on a pitch too soft to suit him and was promptly given a place in the First Test at Edgbaston.

In that match, which ended disastrously after Arthur Gilligan and Maurice Tate produced one of the finest bowling performances in Test history to bowl South Africa out for a mere 30 runs in their first innings, Parker was by far the best of the South African bowlers, taking six of the ten wickets that fell for 152 runs. In the second Test, which England won by the same margin of an innings and 18 runs, Parker was the only bowler to take a wicket, taking the two wickets that fell for 121 runs in an innings declared for 531 runs.

However, Parker was not able to play in matches against counties and, despite having taken two-thirds of the wickets that had fallen in the first two Tests, he was not given a further trial. He never played first-class cricket again, and is still the only South African Test cricketer not to play first-class cricket in his own country.

Parker returned to South Africa and in 1929 married Marguerite Grace ("Peg") Illingworth of Bradford, England. They raised five children in Port Elizabeth, South Africa. In his latter years Parker's research in breeding sheep for better wool led him to move to Australia, where he died in Thredbo in the Snowy Mountains in 1969.

== See also ==
- List of South Africa cricketers who have taken five-wicket hauls on Test debut
