= Bob Catterall =

South African cricketer (1900–1961)

Personal information
- Full name: Robert Hector Catterall
- Born: 10 July 1900; Port Elizabeth, Cape Province
- Died: 3 January 1961 (aged 60); Kempton Park, Gauteng
- Batting: Right-handed
- Bowling: Right-arm medium
- Role: Batsman

International information
- National side: South Africa (1922–1931)
- Test debut (cap 103): 23 December 1922 v England
- Last Test: 13 February 1931 v England

Career statistics
Competition	Test	First-class
Matches	24	124
Runs scored	1,555	5,849
Batting average	37.92	29.99
100s/50s	3/11	9/31
Top score	120	147
Balls bowled	342	3,618
Wickets	7	53
Bowling average	23.14	30.73
5 wickets in innings	0	0
10 wickets in match	0	0
Best bowling	3/15	4/22
Catches/stumpings	12/–	52/–
- Source: Cricinfo, 14 November 2022

Robert Hector Catterall (10 July 1900 – 3 January 1961) was a South African cricketer who played in 24 Test matches from 1922 to 1931.

Catterall was a right-handed batsman, usually batting in the middle order but sometimes in the earlier part of his career used as an opener, and a right-arm medium-pace bowler often used to break troublesome partnerships, though he did not take any Test wickets until the final series that he played in.

== Early domestic cricket ==
Catterall was educated at Jeppe High School for Boys in Johannesburg where he was coached by the former Gloucestershire cricketer and Lord's coach Alfred Atfield.

He made his first-class cricket debut for Transvaal in 1920–21, achieving little in two games, but the following season he played regularly and was a consistent scorer, averaging more than 42 although he passed 50 only twice and his highest score was only 75. In 1922–23, an England team, playing non-Tests as Marylebone Cricket Club and Tests as England, toured South Africa and in the first-class match with Transvaal before the Test series began Catterall, opening the batting, scored 128 in 195 minutes with 13 fours and two sixes. That innings led to his selection for the South Africa side for the first Test match against England just a week later.

== Test cricket ==
Catterall opened the innings twice on his first Test appearance, the first game of the five-match series against England. In the first innings he made 39 which proved to be the top score in a poor innings of 148 all out; in the second Catterall was out for just 17, but the match was rescued by a chanceless innings of 176 by Herbie Taylor which set up a target of 387 for the England side in the fourth innings which they fell a long way short of. The second Test was a low-scoring game which was won by the narrow margin of one wicket by the England team: the only scores of more than 50 came in second-innings second-wicket partnership of 155 between Catterall and Taylor, and Catterall's 76 was the highest score of the match. By contrast, the third game of the series was a high-scoring slow-scoring draw in which a day was lost to rain: Catterall made 52 in his only innings, this time opening with Taylor and putting on 110 for the first wicket.

Between the third and fourth Tests, Catterall played in a second first-class match for Transvaal against the touring side and top-scored for his team with 68 in the first innings. With scores of 31 and 8 he was less successful in the fourth Test, and in the final game, which England won to take the series, he also performed modestly, making 17 and 22 in the two innings. In the series as a whole, Catterall had scored 272 runs at an average of 30.22 and in terms of the South African team was third in aggregate and fourth in the averages.

== 1924 Test series in England ==
Catterall played no first-class cricket between the end of the 1922–23 season and the start of the 1924 South African tour to England, for which he was selected. He had a strange tour, as Wisden Cricketers' Almanack noted: "Taking the whole tour through, Catterall had quite a modest record—1,389 runs with an average of 27," it wrote. "But inasmuch as he triumphed in the Test matches, scoring 120 at Birmingham, 120 at Lord's and 95 at the Oval, he was in a sense the outstanding figure on the side." Wisden backed this judgment by making him one of its five Cricketers of the Year in the 1925 almanack.

The Test series began badly for the South Africans: in reply to an England total of 438 made through consistent batting, the touring team were shot out in 45 minutes for just 30 in 12-and-a-half overs by Arthur Gilligan and Maurice Tate, with Catterall, opening the innings, failing to score. It was and remains the lowest Test score in England and at the time it equalled the lowest innings score in all Test cricket. South Africa's second innings was very different, but, trailing by 408, they fell 18 runs short of making England bat again: "Nothing during the tour did the South Africans more credit than the way in which, on following on, they battled against overwhelming odds," Wisden reported. Catterall, batting in the middle order, led the team to a total of 390 by scoring 120, and was the last man out.

The result in the second Test of the series, held at Lord's, was identical to the first game, and Catterall's first-innings score of 120 was a repeat performance too. He benefited from being dropped when his score was five by the wicketkeeper George Wood, and again at 30 in the slips by Frank Woolley: the first miss was reported by Wisden as being "as direct a chance as a wicket-keeper standing back could expect to get". South Africa's defeat in this match was through the failure to take wickets – they took only two England wickets and conceded 531 runs in the process – and though Catterall made 45 in the second innings the match was lost with time to spare.

England won the third Test as well to take the series with two games to play: in this match, only Catterall and captain Herbie Taylor made runs in the first innings, and they jointly top-scored in the second innings with 56 apiece, though what Wisden termed "a rash call" by Catterall ran his captain out before the first innings arrears had been cleared, and the game subsided after that. The fourth Test was ruined by rain, and Catterall had only just arrived to bat on the first day when the match was interrupted by rain, and it never resumed.

The fifth and final Test was also somewhat affected by rain, but on a batsman's wicket at The Oval both sides made large scores, and Catterall's 95 in just 125 minutes was the highest individual score for the South Africans. That innings left him with an aggregate of 471 runs in the series and an average of 67.28, almost double the aggregate and more than double the average of the next best South African batsman, Fred Susskind.

== Return to South Africa ==
Domestic cricket in South Africa was limited in the 1924–25 season, when there was an unofficial tour by a team of 15 English cricketers, a majority of whom had had Test experience but had missed out on the official tour that winter to Australia. The tour team is generally known now as S. B. Joel's XI after the financier Solomon Joel who sponsored it, but at the time was more widely known as "the Hon L. H. Tennyson's Team" after Lionel Tennyson, 3rd Baron Tennyson, who captained the side. The touring side played 14 first-class matches and five of them were against a team representing the whole of South Africa, and Catterall played in all five of those games. He achieved little in the early games when opening the innings, but as a middle-order batsman he played an innings of 86 that was instrumental in his team's success in the final game that enabled them to square the series. The following season, 1925–26, was a wholly domestic year in South African cricket, and Catterall switched teams from Transvaal to Natal and featured in just five first-class matches, in one of which, the game against Griqualand West, he made 147, which was the highest score of his entire first-class career. Similarly, 1926–27 was a domestic season only, and Catterall had a modest batting record with no centuries, although he bowled more than ever before.

In 1927–28, however, domestic competition was again suspended for the visit of another MCC team representing England, with five Test matches played. The England team was not rated as strong, as many of the leading players opted not to tour and the side was led by R. T. Stanyforth, whose cricket had been largely for MCC and for the Army, but it was expected to be strong enough to beat the South Africans. In the event, that expectation proved less and less realistic as the tour went on: England duly won the first two Tests, but the third was drawn, and South Africa then squared the series by winning the final two games.

The upturn in South African fortunes was based largely on the discovery of effective bowlers, and the batting, Catterall included, remained consistent throughout the series. In the first Test, Catterall, batting at No 4, top-scored with a first innings of 86, though he was then part of an upper-order collapse in the second innings that gave England an easy win. He was not successful in the second Test, but in the third his second-innings 76 was one of five South African scores between 60 and 80 that secured a draw after a substantial first-innings deficit. Innings of 39 and 23 in the fourth Test helped South Africa to their first win of the series, and a score of 119 in the final match formed the backbone of the South African first innings. With 379 runs in the series and an average of 42.11, Catterall was the leading regular player on the South African side, though Shunter Coen, with two not-out innings, had a better average from just two matches.

The 1928–29 South African domestic cricket season was taken up with choosing the side to tour England in 1929, and the Currie Cup competition was not played; Catterall appeared in three matches for the Orange Free State cricket team, without any great success, but his past record in Tests meant that his place on the tour was assured anyway.

== 1929 Test series in England ==
Catterall, Herbie Taylor and captain Nummy Deane were the only survivors of the 1924 team to England to be picked for the 1929 tour.
