= Douglas Dumbleton =

New Zealand cricket umpire

Personal information
- Full name: Douglas Philip Dumbleton
- Born: 27 April 1918; Wellington, New Zealand
- Died: 4 March 2005 (aged 86); Mount Maunganui, New Zealand

Umpiring information
- Tests umpired: 2 (1963–1964)
- Source: Cricinfo, 5 July 2013

Douglas Philip Dumbleton (27 April 1918 – 4 March 2005) was a New Zealand cricket umpire from Wellington. He stood in two Test matches at the Basin Reserve in Wellington in 1963 and 1964.

Dumbleton played one first-class match for Wellington in the Plunket Shield in the 1940s. He umpired 17 first-class matches between 1954 and 1969, all but one of them at the Basin Reserve. He was a leading figure in the formation of the New Zealand Umpires' Association, and became its first life member.

== See also ==
- List of Test cricket umpires
- English cricket team in New Zealand in 1962–63
- South African cricket team in New Zealand in 1963–64
