= Ray Emery (cricketer) =

New Zealand cricketer

- Emery in July 1945

Personal information
- Full name: Raymond William George Emery
- Born: 28 March 1915; Auckland, New Zealand
- Died: 18 December 1982 (aged 67); Auckland, New Zealand
- Batting: Right-handed
- Bowling: Right-arm medium

International information
- National side: New Zealand (1952)
- Test debut (cap 55): 8 February 1952 v West Indies
- Last Test: 15 February 1952 v West Indies

Domestic team information
- Years: Team
- 1936/37–1946/47: Auckland
- 1947/48–1953/54: Canterbury

Career statistics
Competition	Test	First-class
Matches	2	24
Runs scored	46	1,177
Batting average	11.50	29.42
100s/50s	0/0	3/5
Top score	28	123
Balls bowled	46	1,790
Wickets	2	22
Bowling average	26.00	34.27
5 wickets in innings	0	0
10 wickets in match	0	0
Best bowling	2/52	4/41
Catches/stumpings	0/–	10/–
- Source: Cricinfo, 1 April 2017

Raymond William George Emery (28 March 1915 – 18 December 1982) was a New Zealand cricketer who played two Tests for New Zealand in 1952. He was also an officer in the Royal New Zealand Air Force.

== Life and career ==
Ray Emery attended Takapuna Grammar School in Auckland. He played one match for Auckland in 1936–37.

During the Second World War Emery joined the Royal New Zealand Air Force and served in Britain, flying Hurricanes with the Royal Air Force after training in Canada. He remained in the Air Force after the war, attaining the rank of squadron leader. In 1947 he prepared a report on Australian civilian air traffic control utilising a rodoniscope, investigating its applicability to New Zealand.

After three and a half years service in Britain, he returned to New Zealand and married Jean Millson at St Mary's Cathedral, Auckland, in July 1945.

He played nine matches for Auckland from 1943–44 to 1947–48 without establishing himself in the side. Batting in the middle order, he scored 110 against Otago in 1945–46, and 123 against Wellington in 1946–47, but those were the only innings in which he reached 30.

He moved to Christchurch in late 1947. Playing for Canterbury in 1950–51, he scored 240 runs at 30.00 in the Plunket Shield, including 110 against Wellington when he opened the batting for the first time and played the decisive innings in a low-scoring match. In 1951–52, still opening the batting, he made 433 runs at 72.16 in the Plunket Shield, with four 50s, and topped the national averages. At the time he was described as "one of the few New Zealand batsmen able to concentrate", batting "calmly, methodically, and capably". He and Gordon Leggat (346 runs at 57.66) formed a strong opening pair that helped Canterbury win the Plunket Shield.

Although he was nearly 37, he was selected for both Tests against the touring West Indies at the end of the 1951–52 season. He made 28 in an opening partnership of 44 with Geoff Rabone in the second innings of the First Test, and took the wickets of Frank Worrell and Clyde Walcott with his medium-pace bowling in the Second Test (2 for 52 off 46 balls), but otherwise had little impact.

In the next two seasons he played four matches and scored only 80 runs. That was the end of his first-class career.

In 1955 Emery returned to Auckland, where he was one of the leading figures in the establishment of Auckland Airport. One of the roads in the airport is named Ray Emery Drive after him.
