= Okey McCabe =

South African cricket umpire

Personal information
- Full name: AN McCabe
- Born: 1904
- Died: 19 November 1977 (aged 72–73)

Umpiring information
- Tests umpired: 1 (1953)
- Source: Cricinfo, 12 July 2013

Okey McCabe (1904 – 19 November 1977) was a South African cricket umpire. He stood in one Test match, South Africa vs. New Zealand, in 1953.

== See also ==
- List of Test cricket umpires
