= Prasad Sinha =

Indian cricket umpire (1911–1993)

Personal information
- Full name: Prasad Kumar Sinha
- Born: 26 September 1911
- Died: 14 August 1993 (aged 81); Calcutta, India

Umpiring information
- Tests umpired: 2 (1948–1952)
- Source: Cricinfo, 16 July 2013

Prasad Kumar Sinha (26 September 1911 – 14 August 1993) was an Indian cricket umpire. He stood in two Test matches between 1948 and 1952.

Sinha, known as Pissu, also worked on All India Radio cricket broadcasts as a scorer.

== See also ==
- List of Test cricket umpires
