= Gordon Becker =

Australian cricketer (born 1936)

Personal information
- Full name: Gordon Charles Becker
- Born: 14 March 1936 (age 90); Katanning, Western Australia
- Batting: Right-handed
- Role: Wicketkeeper-batsman

Domestic team information
- Years: Team
- 1963/64–1968/69: Western Australia

Career statistics
| Competition | First-class |
|---|---|
| Matches | 52 |
| Runs scored | 2,227 |
| Batting average | 27.49 |
| 100s/50s | 3/13 |
| Top score | 195 |
| Catches/stumpings | 118/22 |
- Source: Cricinfo, 6 August 2025

Gordon Charles Becker (born 14 March 1936) is a former Australian cricketer. A wicketkeeper-batsman, he played 52 first-class matches, mostly for Western Australia, between 1963/64 and 1968/69. He toured South Africa with the Australian team in 1966–67, but did not play in any of the Test matches.

Becker began his career as a batsman at Perth Boys High School, only taking up wicket-keeping after a few seasons of club cricket. His highest first-class score was 195, when Western Australia defeated the touring Indian team in 1967–68 by an innings.

After his playing career ended, Becker coached club and junior state teams, and served as a state selector.
