= Cyril Coote (umpire) =

South African cricket umpire (1913–1973)

Personal information
- Full name: Cyril Dudley Coote
- Born: 8 April 1913
- Died: 10 April 1973 (aged 60)
- Role: Umpire

Umpiring information
- Tests umpired: 1 (1953)
- Source: Cricinfo, 7 June 2019

Cyril Coote (8 April 1913 – 10 April 1973) was a South African cricket umpire. He stood in one Test match, South Africa vs. New Zealand, in 1953. He also umpired a match between the Marylebone Cricket Club (MCC) and North Eastern Transvaal during England's tour to South Africa in 1948–49.

== See also ==
- List of Test cricket umpires
