= Lewis Johnston (umpire) =

New Zealand cricket umpire

Personal information
- Full name: Lewis Charles Johnston
- Born: 19 July 1917; Christchurch, New Zealand
- Died: 12 March 1993 (aged 75); Christchurch, New Zealand

Umpiring information
- Tests umpired: 1 (1963)
- Source: Cricinfo, 9 July 2013

Lewis Charles Johnston (19 July 1917 – 12 March 1993) was a New Zealand cricket umpire. He stood in one Test match, New Zealand vs. England, in 1963.

== See also ==
- List of Test cricket umpires
- English cricket team in New Zealand in 1962–63
