= Dal Collins =

South African cricket umpire (1907–2001)

Personal information
- Full name: Dalkeith Valentine Collins
- Born: 31 July 1907; Cape Town, South Africa
- Died: 7 January 2001 (aged 93); Cape Town, South Africa
- Relatives: Stanley Collins (brother)

Umpiring information
- Tests umpired: 10 (1949–1962)
- WTests umpired: 1 (1961)
- Source: Cricinfo, 5 July 2013

Dalkeith Valentine Collins (31 July 1907 – 7 January 2001) was a South African cricket umpire. He stood in ten Test matches between 1949 and 1962.

Collins officiated in 29 first-class matches, most of them at the Newlands Cricket Ground in Cape Town, between December 1939 and January 1962. He and his younger brother Stanley Collins officiated in several matches together, including Stanley's only Test match in January 1954; it was the first time brothers had umpired a Test match together. The English team that toured South Africa in 1956–57 regarded Dal Collins as the best umpire in South Africa, and unsuccessfully requested that he be appointed again after the Second Test at Cape Town.
