= Stanley Collins =

South African cricket umpire (1909–1993)

Personal information
- Born: 9 March 1909; Cape Town, South Africa
- Died: 2 June 1993 (aged 84); Cape Town, South Africa
- Relatives: Dal Collins (brother)

Umpiring information
- Tests umpired: 1 (1954)
- Source: Cricinfo, 5 July 2013

Stanley Collins (6 March 1909 – 2 June 1993) was a South African cricket umpire. He stood in one Test match, South Africa v New Zealand, in January 1954.

Collins officiated in 16 first-class matches, all of them at the Newlands Cricket Ground in Cape Town, between December 1939 and January 1961. He and his brother Dal Collins officiated in several matches together, including Stanley's only Test match; it was the first time brothers had umpired a Test match together.
