= James Street (cricketer) =

English cricketer

Personal information
- Full name: James Street
- Born: 10 March 1839; Cranleigh, Surrey, England
- Died: 17 September 1906 (aged 67); Godalming, Surrey, England
- Batting: Right-handed
- Bowling: Right-arm fast
- Role: Bowler

Domestic team information
- Years: Team
- 1863–1878: Surrey
- FC debut: 20 August 1863 Surrey v North
- Last FC: 31 August 1878 Surrey v Gloucestershire

Umpiring information
- Tests umpired: 1 (1890–1890)

Career statistics
Competition	First-class
Matches	143
Runs scored	1,308
Batting average	7.51
100s/50s	0/1
Top score	50
Balls bowled	28,072
Wickets	540
Bowling average	21.44
5 wickets in innings	36
10 wickets in match	6
Best bowling	7/141
Catches/stumpings	74/–
- Source: CricketArchive, 23 March 2008

James Street (10 March 1839 – 17 September 1906) was an English cricketer who played for Surrey between 1863 and 1878. A round arm fast bowler, he took 534 of his 540 first-class wickets for Surrey. Subsequently, he became an umpire, appearing in that role between 1873 and 1899, but in only two matches before 1877. He umpired in one Test match, that between England and Australia at The Oval on 11 and 12 August 1890.

He did not become a regular for Surrey until 1868, and even after he had established himself his bowling figures were not especially good by the standards of the time. His best seasons were 1872 and 1873, when he took 60 wickets at an average of 15.11 and then 70 at 17.57.

His brother, George Street, and his son, Alfred Street, were both umpires, his son also playing for Surrey as well as surpassing his father by umpiring in seven Tests.
