= Geoffrey Treadwell =

South African cricket umpire (1892–1967)

Personal information
- Full name: Geoffrey Beauchamp Treadwell
- Born: 21 September 1892; Orpington, London, England
- Died: 12 August 1967 (aged 74); Johannesburg, South Africa

Umpiring information
- Tests umpired: 4 (1927–1930)
- Source: Cricinfo, 16 July 2013

Geoffrey Treadwell (21 September 1892 – 12 August 1967) was a South African cricket umpire. He stood in four Test matches between 1927 and 1930.

== See also ==
- List of Test cricket umpires
