= Arthur Laver =

South African cricket umpire (1880–1965)

Personal information
- Full name: Arthur George Laver
- Born: 6 June 1880; Kyneton, Australia
- Died: 6 July 1965 (aged 85); Johannesburg, South Africa

Umpiring information
- Tests umpired: 10 (1921–1928)
- Source: Cricinfo, 7 June 2019

Arthur Laver (6 June 1880 – 6 July 1965) was a South African cricket umpire, born in Sydney, Australia.

Laver umpired 21 first-class matches in South Africa between 1921 and 1935. He stood in 10 Test matches between 1921 and 1928.

== See also ==
- List of Test cricket umpires
