= Frederick Payne (umpire) =

South African cricket umpire

Personal information
- Full name: Frederick Robert William Payne
- Born: 12 January 1908; Port Elizabeth, South Africa
- Died: 31 July 1992 (aged 84); Port Elizabeth, South Africa

Umpiring information
- Tests umpired: 1 (1954)
- Source: Cricinfo, 14 July 2013

Frederick Payne (12 January 1908 – 31 July 1992) was a South African cricket umpire. He stood in one Test match, South Africa vs. New Zealand, in 1954.

== See also ==
- List of Test cricket umpires
