= Henry Promnitz =

South African cricketer

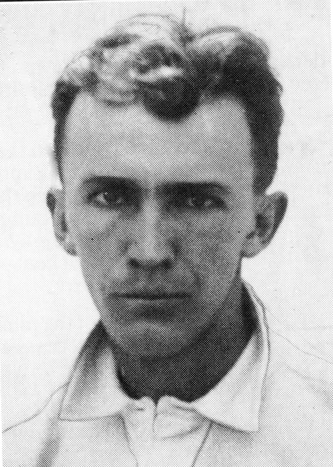

Cricket information
- Batting: Right-handed
- Bowling: Right-arm slow

International information
- National side: South Africa
- Test debut: 24 December 1927 v England
- Last Test: 31 December 1927 v England

Career statistics
Competition	Test	First-class
Matches	2	45
Runs scored	14	592
Batting average	3.50	11.83
100s/50s	0/0	0/1
Top score	5	50
Balls bowled	528	8,518
Wickets	8	150
Bowling average	20.12	23.80
5 wickets in innings	1	8
10 wickets in match	0	1
Best bowling	5/58	7/101
Catches/stumpings	2/–	19/–
- Source: CricketArchive, 14 November 2022

Henry Louis Ernest Promnitz (23 February 1904 – 7 September 1983) was a South African cricketer who played in two Tests in the 1927–28 series against England.

A right-arm slow bowler who bowled a mixture of off and leg spin, he took five wickets in the first innings (figures of 37–14–58–5) on his Test debut against England in Johannesburg. He took three wickets in the Second Test, but then lost his place to the pace bowler Arthur Ochse.

He represented Border from 1924–25 to 1927–28, Griqualand West from 1928–29 to 1932–33, and Orange Free State from 1933–34 to 1936–37. His best match figures came in his second match, for Border against Eastern Province in 1925–26, when he took 6 for 55 and 5 for 46. His best innings figures were 7 for 101 for Griqualand West against Natal in 1931–32.

== See also ==
- List of South Africa cricketers who have taken five-wicket hauls on Test debut
