= Hayward Kidson =

South African cricket umpire (1925–1995)

Personal information
- Full name: Hayward Cary Kidson
- Born: 11 November 1925; Springfontein, South Africa
- Died: 24 April 1995 (aged 69); Johannesburg, South Africa

Umpiring information
- Tests umpired: 11 (1961–1967)
- Source: Cricinfo, 9 July 2013

Hayward Cary Kidson (11 November 1925 – 24 April 1995) was a South African cricket umpire. Making his umpiring debut in 1961, he stood in eleven Test matches, the last of which was played in 1967.

== See also ==
- List of Test cricket umpires
