= Edward Page (umpire) =

South African cricket umpire (1889–1939)

Personal information
- Full name: Edward Searle Page
- Born: 9 March 1889; Port Elizabeth, South Africa
- Died: 12 December 1939 (aged 50); Port Elizabeth, South Africa
- Role: Umpire

Umpiring information
- Tests umpired: 1 (1928)
- Source: Cricinfo, 14 July 2013

Edward Page (9 March 1889 – 12 December 1939) was a South African cricket umpire. He stood in one Test match, South Africa vs. England, in 1928.

== See also ==
- List of Test cricket umpires
