= Gunther Goldman =

German-born South African cricket umpire (1924–2007)

Personal information
- Born: 16 June 1924; Hamburg, Germany
- Died: 10 July 2007 (aged 83); San Antonio, Texas, U.S.

Umpiring information
- Tests umpired: 2 (1967–1970)
- Source: Cricinfo, 6 July 2013

Gunther Josef Goldman (16 June 1924 – 10 July 2007) was a German-born South African cricket umpire. He stood in two Test matches between 1967 and 1970. He umpired 21 first-class cricket matches between 1961 and 1973, all of them at the Newlands ground in Cape Town.

Goldman applied to become a naturalized U.S. resident in January 1983, at which point he was living in San Antonio, Texas. He died there on 10 July 2007, at the age of 83.

== See also ==
- List of Test cricket umpires
