= C. Saunders =

South African cricket umpire

Umpiring information
- Tests umpired: 1 (1928)
- Source: Cricinfo, 16 July 2013

C. Saunders was a South African cricket umpire. He stood in one Test match, South Africa vs. England, in 1928.

== See also ==
- List of Test cricket umpires
