= James Draper (umpire) =

South African cricket umpire (1925–2013)

Personal information
- Full name: James Gordon Draper
- Born: 9 March 1925; Durban, South Africa
- Died: 10 January 2013 (aged 87); Durban, South Africa

Umpiring information
- Tests umpired: 5 (1964–1970)
- WTests umpired: 1 (1960)
- Source: Cricinfo, 5 July 2013

James Draper (9 March 1925 – 10 January 2013) was a South African cricket umpire. Making his umpiring debut in 1964, he stood in five Test matches, officiating in his last Test in 1970.

== See also ==
- List of Test cricket umpires
