= Harry Adams (cricket umpire) =

South African cricket umpire (1881–1946)

Personal information
- Full name: Harry Victor Adams
- Born: 1881; Rosebank, Cape Town, South Africa
- Died: 21 December 1946 (aged 64–65); Cape Town, South Africa

Umpiring information
- Tests umpired: 2 (1921–1928)
- Source: Cricinfo, 1 July 2013

Harry Adams (1881 – 21 December 1946) was a South African cricket umpire. He stood in two Test matches between 1921 and 1928.

== See also ==
- List of Test cricket umpires
