= Gustave Verheyen =

South African cricket umpire (1880–1951)

Personal information
- Full name: Gustave Andrew Verheyen
- Born: 6 August 1880; Cape Town, Cape Colony
- Died: 9 March 1951 (aged 70); Kimberley, Northern Cape, South Africa

Umpiring information
- Tests umpired: 1 (1928)
- Source: Cricinfo, 16 July 2013

Gustave Verheyen (6 August 1880 – 9 March 1951) was a South African cricket umpire. He stood in one Test match, South Africa vs. England, in 1928.

== See also ==
- List of Test cricket umpires
