= Jack Badley =

West Indian cricket umpire

Umpiring information
- Tests umpired: 1 (1930)
- Source: Cricinfo, 1 July 2013

Jack Badley was a West Indian cricket umpire. He stood in one Test match, West Indies vs. England, in 1930.

== See also ==
- List of Test cricket umpires
