= George Allsop =

English cricketer (1864–1927)

George Allsop (4 January 1864 – 27 March 1927) played first-class cricket for Transvaal between 1890–91 and 1897–98, and also stood as an umpire in one cricket Test match in 1895–96. He was born at Houghton, Hampshire, England and died at Johannesburg, South Africa.
