= Ernest Tyldesley =

English cricketer

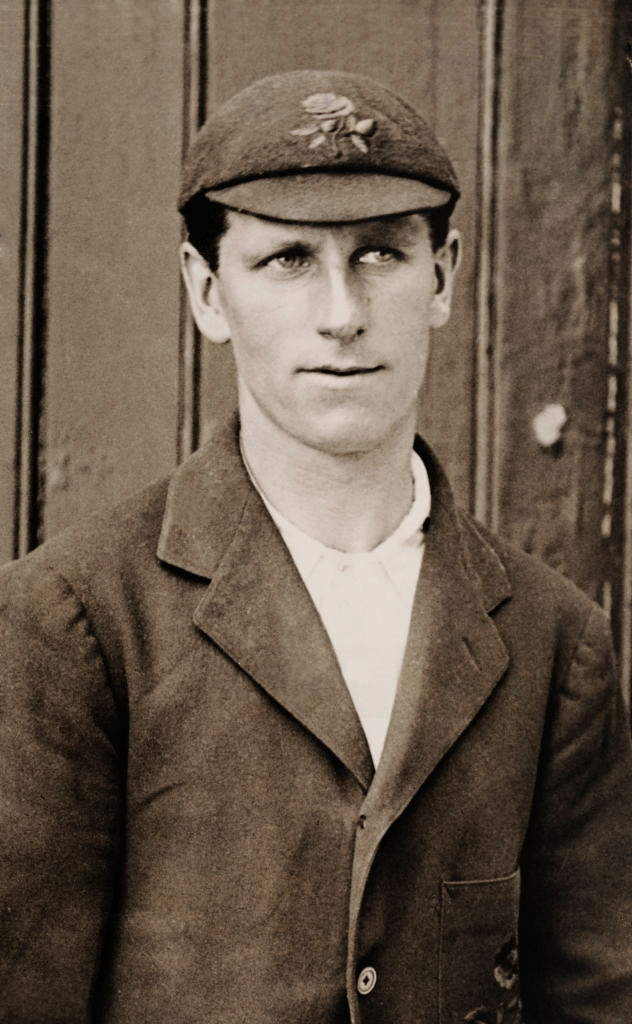
- Tyldesley in about 1925

Personal information
- Born: 5 February 1889; Worsley, Lancashire
- Died: 5 May 1962 (aged 73); Rhos-on-Sea, Denbighshire, Wales
- Batting: Right-handed
- Bowling: Right-arm slow-medium

International information
- National side: England
- Test debut: 28 May 1921 v Australia
- Last Test: 16 March 1929 v Australia

Career statistics
Competition	Tests	First-class
Matches	14	648
Runs scored	990	38,874
Batting average	55.00	45.46
100s/50s	3/6	102/191
Top score	122	256*
Balls bowled	2	421
Wickets	0	6
Bowling average	–	57.66
5 wickets in innings	–	0
10 wickets in match	–	0
Best bowling	–	3/33
Catches/stumpings	2/0	295/0
- Source: CricketArchive, 25 May 2019

George Ernest Tyldesley (5 February 1889 – 5 May 1962) was an English cricketer. The younger brother of Johnny Tyldesley and the leading batsman for Lancashire. He remains Lancashire's most prolific run-getter of all time, and is one of only a few batsmen to have scored 100 centuries in the first-class game.

In Test cricket, Tyldesley was part of England sides that won the Ashes in 1926, and 1928–29. He also played in four Ashes matches in England, out of his 14 Tests overall, which included three centuries.

== Career ==
Tyldesley was born in Roe Green, Worsley, Lancashire. He had a slow start in county cricket in 1909, and though he played fairly regularly for Lancashire in the following three years – scoring his first century against Sussex in 1912 – but it was 1913 before he was firmly established in the team. That season he reached 1,000 runs for the first time and in 1914, the last season before war put a stop to cricket, he maintained this form.

After the war ended, 1919 saw Tyldesley jump into the ranks of the top English batsmen with some solid batting, which resulted in his nomination as a Cricketer of the Year by Wisden. Though 1920 was uneven despite a score of 244 against Warwickshire, Tyldesley was already among a large crop of top-class professional batsmen.

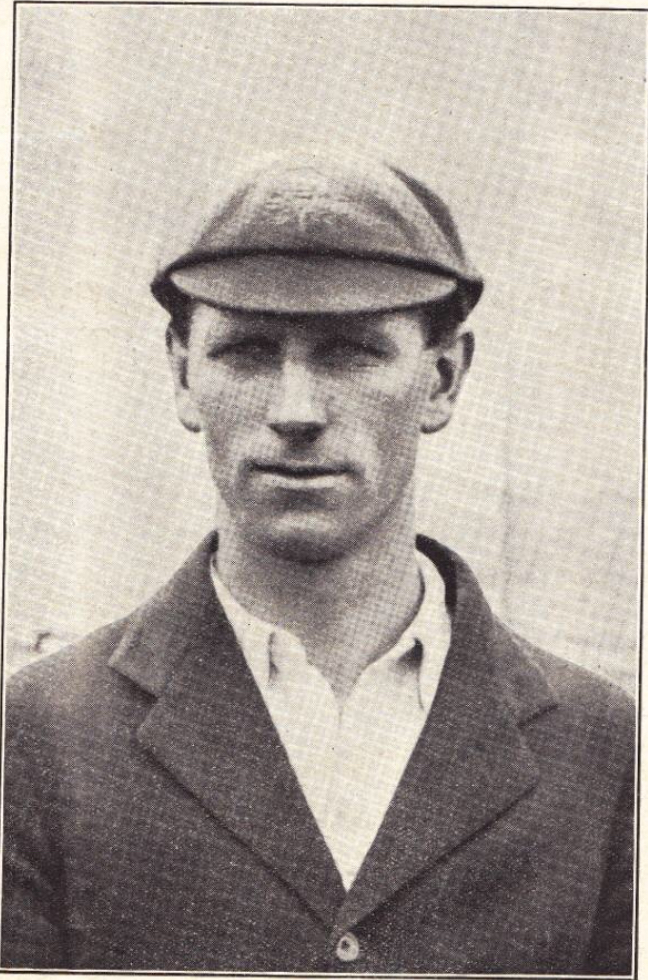
Ernest Tyldesley 1921

1921 saw Tyldesley make his debut in Test cricket; though he was dropped after a poor performance on a damp pitch at Trent Bridge. 1922 saw him reach 2,000 runs for the first time. Tyldesley continued until injury kept him out of the last half of 1925. 1926, however, saw Tyldesley scoring 50 or better in 10 consecutive innings.

Tyldesley maintained his form in 1927, and scored 3,024 runs in 1928. However, he was not at his best on his only tour of Australia in 1928/29 until injury weakened England's team at the end of the tour.

Though never selected for the Test team again, Tyldesley remained a prolific scorer for Lancashire right up to 1934, and in 1933 had the distinction of being granted a second benefit for his services to the county, though this only raised £802 as against £2,458 for his 1924 benefit. He scored his 100th first-class century in a game against Northamptonshire in July 1934. 1935, at the age of 46, saw him again affected by injury and playing only rarely – while the following year, playing as an amateur, he only played two matches before moving into business.

Upon his final appearance in Tests in 1929, Tyldesley's batting average of 55.00 was the highest of any player, at that time, to have completed a career of 20 innings or more.

== Name ==
Tyldesley was called 'George' at home, his given first name. However he signed autographs Ernest.

== Death and legacy ==
Tyldesley died in 1962 in Rhos-on-Sea, Denbighshire, Wales, where he had lived for several years.

Tyldesley's elder brother, Johnny, named the family home in Worsley, Lancashire, "Aigburth" to commemorate his younger brother's Lancashire debut at the Liverpool ground where Lancashire County Cricket Club occasionally play their matches. The home still stands today and a plaque telling the story has been erected by the Worsley Heritage Walks.

His great-great-nephew is the former Yorkshire and England captain turned Cricket Commentator Michael Vaughan.
