= Denys Morkel =

South African cricketer

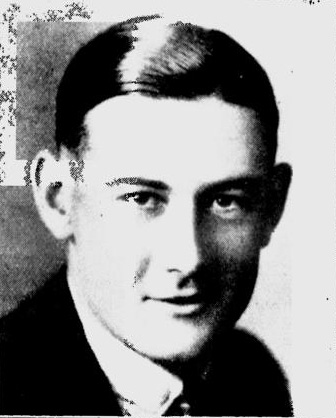
- Morkel in 1931

Personal information
- Born: 25 January 1906; Plumstead, Cape Town, Cape Colony
- Died: 6 October 1980 (aged 74); Nottingham, England
- Batting: Right-handed
- Bowling: Right-arm fast-medium

International information
- National side: South Africa
- Test debut: 24 December 1927 v England
- Last Test: 27 February 1932 v New Zealand

Career statistics
Competition	Test	First-class
Matches	16	86
Runs scored	663	4,494
Batting average	24.55	34.30
100s/50s	0/4	8/22
Top score	88	251
Balls bowled	1,704	10,425
Wickets	18	174
Bowling average	45.61	28.58
5 wickets in innings	0	6
10 wickets in match	0	0
Best bowling	4/93	8/13
Catches/stumpings	13/–	67/–
- Source: Cricinfo, 14 November 2022

Denijs Paul Beck Morkel (25 January 1906 – 6 October 1980) was a South African cricketer who played for Western Province from 1924 and in 16 Test matches for South Africa from 1927–28 to 1931–32.
