= George Wood (cricketer, born 1893) =

English cricketer (1893–1971)

Personal information
- Full name: George Edward Charles Wood
- Born: 22 August 1893; Blackheath, Kent
- Died: 18 March 1971 (aged 77); Christchurch, Hampshire
- Batting: Right-handed
- Bowling: Right-arm medium
- Role: Wicket-keeper

International information
- National side: England
- Test debut (cap 217): 14 June 1924 v South Africa
- Last Test: 15 July 1924 v South Africa

Domestic team information
- Years: Team
- 1913–1920: Cambridge University
- 1919–1927: Kent

Career statistics
| Competition | Test | First-class |
|---|---|---|
| Matches | 3 | 101 |
| Runs scored | 7 | 2,773 |
| Batting average | 3.50 | 19.94 |
| 100s/50s | 0/0 | 1/10 |
| Top score | 6 | 128 |
| Catches/stumpings | 5/1 | 119/53 |
- Source: ESPNcricinfo, 19 July 2009

George Edward Charles Wood (22 August 1893 – 18 March 1971) was an English cricketer who played in three Test matches in 1924.

A wicket-keeper who habitually stood up to the stumps against all styles of bowling, he was educated at Cheltenham College and Pembroke College, Cambridge and played first-class cricket for Cambridge University from 1913 to 1920. He won Blues both before and after the First World War and proved his all-round sporting talent by also gaining Blues in hockey and rugby. He made his debut for Kent in 1919, winning his cap in 1920, and played for the county until 1927. He turned down an invitation to tour Australia in 1920–21, but played for the amateur team led by Archie MacLaren which defeated the Australians in 1921.

Wood also appeared in matches for Marylebone Cricket Club from 1924 to 1932, and, with a smattering of matches for LG Robinson's XI (1913–1921), the Gentlemen (1920–1932), South of England (1920), Free Foresters (1921–1928), CI Thornton's XI (1921), The Rest of England (1923) and HDG Leveson-Gower's XI (1936), made 101 first-class appearances in all. A right-handed lower order batsman, promoted on occasion to open, his only first-class century, 128, came against Free Foresters.

His three Tests were played against the touring South Africans in 1924. The first was the remarkable match at Edgbaston in June, which saw South Africa bowled out for just 30 in reply to England's imposing 438. The tourists rallied in their second innings, posting 390, to lose by an innings and 18 runs in the three-day match. Batting at number 10, Wood contributed just a single on debut before being bowled by Parker, and caught Dave Nourse from the bowling of Arthur Gilligan when South Africa followed on. England won the second Test at Lords by exactly the same margin, thanks to a double century by Jack Hobbs and centuries from Sutcliffe and Woolley. Wood caught South Africa's captain Herbie Taylor for 4, again from the bowling of Gilligan. Wood's last Test match was the third in the series, played at Headingley in July, which England again won in convincing style. Although run out for just 6, Wood took 3 catches and completed a stumping as England ran out winners by 9 wickets.

== Bibliography ==
- Carlaw, Derek (2020). Kent County Cricketers, A to Z: Part One (1806–1914) (PDF). Cardiff: ACS.
- Lewis, Paul (2014). For Kent and Country. Eastbourne: Reveille Press. ISBN 978-19-08336-63-7.
