= Alfred Street (cricket umpire) =

English cricketer and cricket umpire (1869–1951)

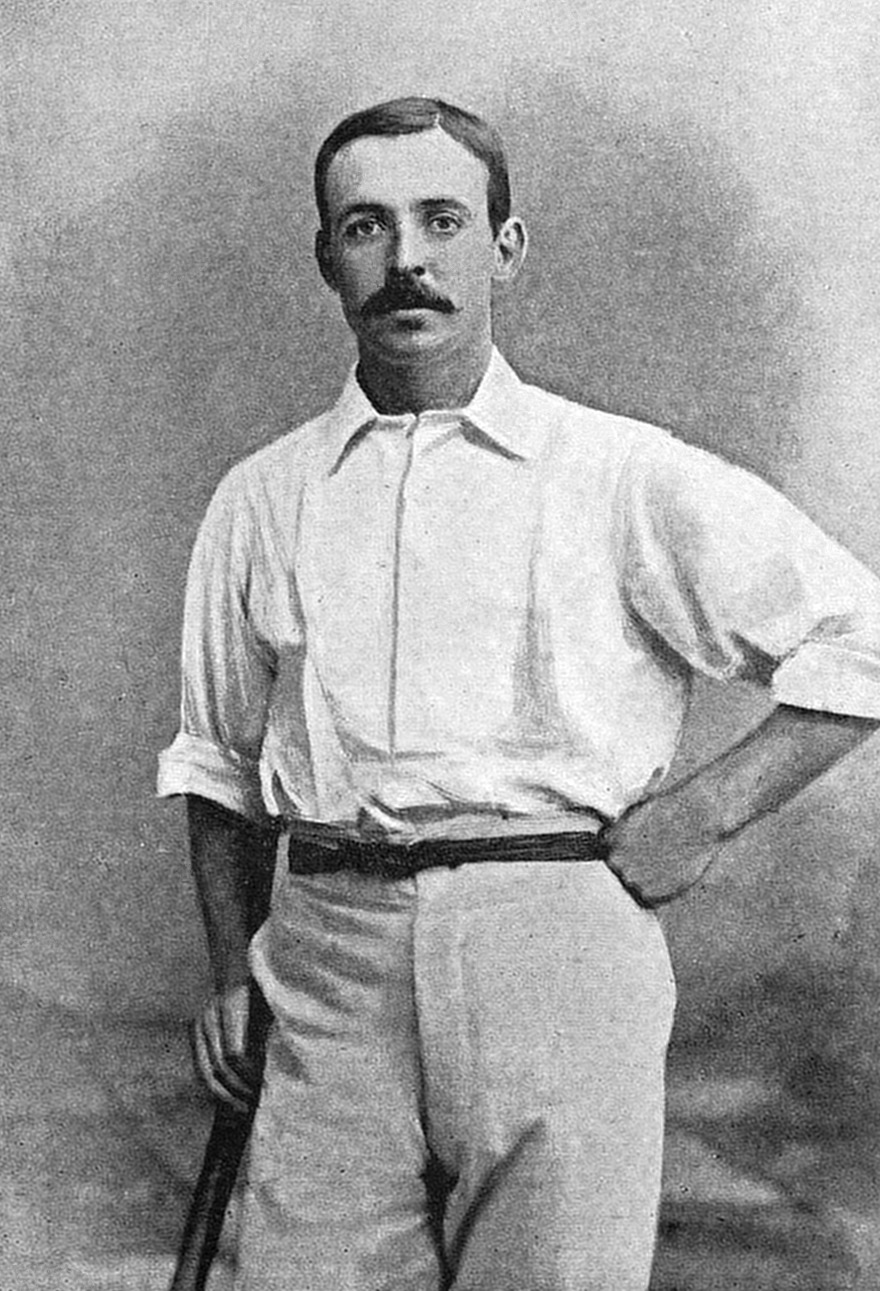
- Street pictured in about 1896

Personal information
- Full name: Alfred Edward Street
- Born: 7 July 1869; Godalming, Surrey, England
- Died: 18 February 1951 (aged 81); Exmouth, Devon, England
- Batting: Right-handed
- Bowling: Right-arm medium
- Relatives: James Street (father); George Street (uncle)

Domestic team information
- Years: Team
- 1892–1898: Surrey

Umpiring information
- Tests umpired: 7 (1912–1926)

Career statistics
Competition	First-class
Matches	51
Runs scored	1,356
Batting average	22.60
100s/50s	1/6
Top score	161
Balls bowled	950
Wickets	15
Bowling average	26.20
5 wickets in innings	0
10 wickets in match	0
Best bowling	3/44
Catches/stumpings	16/–
- Source: CricketArchive, 25 October 2012

Alfred Edward Street (7 July 1869 – 18 February 1951) was a cricketer who played for Surrey and later a respected cricket umpire who stood in several Test matches between 1912 and 1926. He was born at Godalming in Surrey in 1869.

As a player, Street was a middle or lower order right-handed batsman and an occasional medium-pace bowler. He played regularly for the successful Surrey side in only three seasons, from 1894 to 1896, and his one innings of distinction was an unbeaten 161 against Leicestershire at Grace Road, Leicester in 1895, when his batting enabled a Surrey recovery from 94 for six wickets to reach a total of 385, which proved enough to win by an innings. He disappeared from first-class cricket after 1898.

In 1909, Street joined the list of first-class umpires and remained on it for the following 25 years, retiring at the end of the 1934 season, though he reappeared for one match in 1939. He officiated in Test matches for the first time during the 1912 Triangular Tournament and stood again in matches in the 1921, 1924 and 1926 seasons. In all, he umpired in 523 first-class matches.

In the 1919 season, Street was the central figure in the Heygate incident in the match between Somerset and Sussex at the County Ground, Taunton. With the scores tied, the injured Sussex batsman Harold Heygate took more than the two minutes allowed to come to the wicket, and, following a Somerset appeal, Street adjudged him to be timed out and the match result to be a tie. Street's decision was upheld by Marylebone Cricket Club (MCC), though the Laws of Cricket at the time did not allow for a "timed out" dismissal and Heygate was marked on the scorecard as "absent hurt". For a fuller description of this incident, which caused considerable controversy at the time, see the article on Heygate.

His father, James Street, was also an umpire, who stood in one Test in 1890, as well as a player for Surrey. His uncle, George Street, was an umpire too, but was not a player at first-class level. Street died at Exmouth in Devon in 1951.
