= Bill Reeves =

English cricketer and umpire

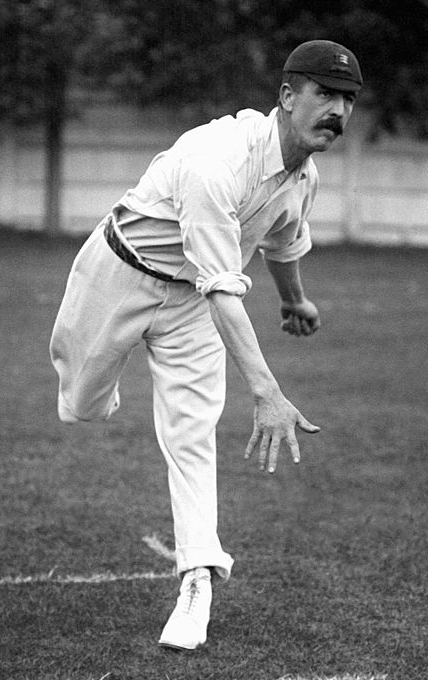
- Reeves pictured in about 1905

Personal information
- Born: 22 June 1875; Cambridge, England
- Died: 22 March 1944 (aged 68); Wormwood Park, Hammersmith, London
- Batting: Right-handed
- Bowling: Right-arm medium

Career statistics
Competition	First-class
Matches	280
Runs scored	6,656
Batting average	16.59
100s/50s	3/24
Top score	135
Balls bowled	31,168
Wickets	601
Bowling average	27.49
5 wickets in innings	38
10 wickets in match	5
Best bowling	7/33
Catches/stumpings	122/–
- Source: CricketArchive, 12 January 2023

William Reeves (22 June 1875 – 22 March 1944) was an English cricketer, who at the conclusion of his playing career became an umpire, officiating in five Test Matches. According to Dudley Carew he was "the Sam Weller of umpires, quick of retort, ingenious of smile, unfailing in friendliness". R.C. Robertson-Glasgow wrote: "If silence or dullness fell upon the game, there was Bill Reeves to put it right."

== Playing career ==
Bill Reeves was a medium-pace bowler and a useful hard-hitting batsman who played for Essex from 1897 to 1921, having begun by joining the groundstaff at Leyton Cricket Ground, which was then the county's headquarters. His best years with the bat were 1905 and 1906. In the former season he reached 1,000 runs for the only time, with 1174 at an average of 29.35, and scored two of his three hundreds. His career highest score of 135 came against Lancashire in only two hours. He also scored 71 out of 90 in 50 minutes against the powerful Yorkshire side, assisting Essex to a score of 521. Yorkshire had to follow-on, and had seven wickets down in their second innings at the end of the game. He scored his other century the following year, 104 against Sussex, when he and Claude Buckenham added 163 for the eighth wicket in only seventy minutes.

In 1901 he took the last five Derbyshire wickets in 11 balls without conceding a run. His most productive season with the ball was 1904, when he took 106 wickets at 26.16, the only occasion when he reached 100 wickets. He took five wickets or more in an innings 11 times that season, and ten or more in a match on three occasions. In 1907 against Nottinghamshire he and Walter Mead bowled unchanged through both innings. From 1910 to 1913 he played in no more than nine matches in any season, but as late as 1920 – when he became 45 years of age – he surprisingly took 62 wickets at 22.59, including the best innings figures of his career, 7/33. He only played in four matches in 1921, his final year and benefit season.

== Umpiring career ==
He umpired in one match in 1920, and then – following his retirement as a player – regularly from 1921 to 1939. His five Tests were in 1924 (two matches, England v South Africa), 1926 (one match, England v Australia), 1937 (one match, England v New Zealand) and 1939 (one match, England v West Indies). He was also due to stand in the 1938 England v Australia match at Old Trafford, but it was abandoned without a ball being bowled.

He was renowned for his witticisms. When a batsman protested that he was not out, Reeves responded: "Weren't you? Wait till you see the papers in the morning." When he thought that a bowler was appealing too often, he observed: "There's only one man who appeals more than you do." "Oh, who's that?" the bowler innocently asked. "Doctor Barnardo," said Reeves.

In 1931 he got into trouble when, in a rain-affected match, he and his fellow umpire allowed the two captains to make freak declarations in order to try to produce a definite result. The authorities decided that Law 54 had been broken. As a result, he, the other umpire and both captains were summoned to Lord's. The match had been played in Wales and Reeves said: "That rule doesn't apply, sir. We were in a foreign country."
