= Harry Butt =

English cricketer (1865–1928)

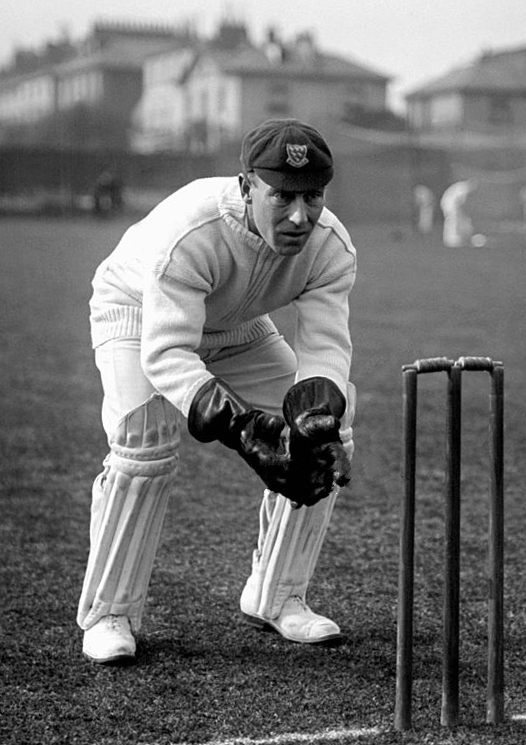
- Butt in about 1905

Personal information
- Full name: Henry Rigden Butt
- Born: 27 December 1865; Sands End, Fulham, Middlesex, England
- Died: 21 December 1928 (aged 62); West Hill, Hastings, Sussex, England
- Batting: Right-handed
- Role: Wicket-keeper

International information
- National side: England
- Test debut (cap 94): 13 February 1896 v South Africa
- Last Test: 23 March 1896 v South Africa

Career statistics
Competition	Test	First-class
Matches	3	550
Runs scored	22	7,391
Batting average	7.33	12.83
100s/50s	0/0	0/18
Top score	13	96
Balls bowled	–	60
Wickets	–	0
Bowling average	–	–
5 wickets in innings	–	–
10 wickets in match	–	–
Best bowling	–	–
Catches/stumpings	1/1	954/277
- Source: CricketArchive, 6 November 2022

Harry Rigden Butt (27 December 1865 – 21 December 1928) was an English cricketer who played first-class cricket for Sussex County Cricket Club and the Marylebone Cricket Club between 1890 and 1912. Butt also played three Test matches for England on their tour to South Africa in 1895–96. He later went on to become an umpire, and stood in that role in six Tests. His popularity was such that when he retired as an umpire due to ill-health, the County captains wrote to the Secretary of the Marylebone Cricket Club asking him to write to Butt to express their regret at the cause.

Butt, a short man, was Sussex's wicket-keeper for twenty years. He was awarded two benefits: the matches between Sussex and Yorkshire at Hove in 1900, and between Sussex and Middlesex at Lord's in 1928.
