= Nummy Deane =

South African cricketer (1895–1939)

- Nummy Deane (right) with Jack White in 1929

Personal information
- Full name: Hubert Gouvaine Deane
- Born: 21 July 1895; Eshowe, Zululand
- Died: 21 October 1939 (aged 44); Johannesburg, Transvaal, Union of South Africa
- Batting: Right-handed

International information
- National side: South Africa

Career statistics
Competition	Tests	First-class
Matches	17	100
Runs scored	628	3795
Batting average	25.12	30.11
100s/50s	0/3	6/18
Top score	93	165
Balls bowled	–	130
Wickets	–	3
Bowling average	–	33.00
5 wickets in innings	–	0
10 wickets in match	–	0
Best bowling	–	3/23
Catches/stumpings	8/–	63/–
- Source: Cricinfo, 23 January 2022

Hubert Gouvaine "Nummy" Deane (21 July 1895 – 21 October 1939) was a South African cricketer who played in 17 Tests from 1924 to 1931. All of his Tests were against England and he captained his country in 12 of them.

== Early cricket ==
Born in Eshowe, Zululand, Deane was a right-handed middle-order batsman whose domestic cricket in South Africa was for Natal from 1919–20 to 1922–23 and then for Transvaal from 1923–24 to 1929–30. In his very first first-class match, for Natal against the Australian Imperial Forces team that played in the UK, South Africa and Australia after the end of the First World War, he took three wickets for 23 runs; these, however, remained his only first-class wickets and his bowling style is not known.

He had limited impact for Natal as a batsman and in 10 matches over four seasons his highest score for the side was 96, made against Transvaal in 1921–22. In his very first game for Transvaal in 1923–24, however, he made 165 out of 246 made while he was at the wicket against the weak Orange Free State team. This score would be the highest of his career and led to his selection for the 1924 South African team in England.

== Test cricketer ==
The 1924 South Africans lost the Test series to England by three matches to nil, with two draws, with the weakness of the bowling singled out by Wisden Cricketers' Almanack in its review of the tour as a prime cause for failure. Deane himself merited not a single mention in the four-page Wisden article describing the highlights of the tour, and his tour figures indicate that he was rarely prominent: in 25 first-class matches, he passed 50 only once, and his 621 runs came at an average of 22.18. The one half-century was a not-out innings of 80 in a match against Scotland in which the South Africans comprehensively outplayed their hosts. Despite this modest record, Deane was picked as a specialist batsman for all five Test matches and in a team in which only Bob Catterall and, to a lesser degree, Fred Susskind made many runs, he did as much as most of his team-mates, scoring 143 runs at an average of 23.83. Mostly he batted in lower middle order at No 7, and his best score came in the third Test when he reverted to that position for the second innings, having opened the batting in the first innings, and made an unbeaten 47 that forced England to bat again after South Africa had followed on 264 runs behind on the first innings.

South African domestic cricket in 1924–25 was dominated by the tour of a team of English cricketers sponsored by the tycoon S. B. Joel; the team included players with Test experience, but though four matches were arranged against a Test-standard South African side, they were granted only first-class status. Deane played in all four but made little impression; he did better in the Transvaal match against Joel's side, when he scored a second-innings 118. From the 1925–26 season, he was captain of the Transvaal team; in his first season, the team won the Currie Cup by winning five matches out of six, and the following year Transvaal won every match they played.

== Test captain ==
With this domestic record of captaincy success, Deane was picked as captain for the South Africa side for the 1927–28 English tour of South Africa, ahead of Herbie Taylor who had led the 1924 tour of England, but whose form had reportedly suffered in the big matches from the pressures of the captaincy. Poor batting led to defeat in the first match of the series and in the second the South Africans had a first-innings lead of 117, with Deane contributing 41 to a total of 250, but still lost the match by 87 runs. The turnaround in the series started with third Test, which was drawn with the South Africans finally posting a respectable total. Deane was instrumental in this: in the first innings, with the score at 146 for seven, he and Buster Nupen both made scores of more than 50, with Deane going on to 77. In the second innings, an all-round better batting performance by the South Africans secured the draw with Deane making a further 73. A new fast-medium bowling combination allied to less brittle batting brought a South African victory in the fourth Test, with Deane batting when victory by four wickets was achieved. And the series was tied at two wins apiece with a South African victory in the final match by eight wickets. As captain, Deane won the toss five times out of five in the series; unusually for the time in which he played, he put the England team in to bat three times, claiming that his young side would play better if they knew the odds they had to face.

With this record, Deane was picked as captain for the 1929 tour of England, and Wisden's tour report was generous in its praise of him, though the tour was not successful in terms of matches won. Deane, it said, had set the high standards in fielding for which the side was praised and was also responsible for the good spirit in which the tour was conducted: "They came with no flourish of trumpets, made friends both on and off the field, and left behind an impression that it is given to few touring sides to attain. Beyond all doubt this was largely due to Deane himself." Deane's batting on the tour was not up to his reputation in South Africa, "but he captained the side with unerring judgment."

Deane hit good form early in the tour, with 42 in the first first-class match against Worcestershire and 68 in the second against Leicestershire. The first Test was a dull and even draw on a pitch that Wisden said was "devoid of life": Deane made 29 out of 44 in his only innings in the game. The second Test at Lord's was also drawn, but was a much more exciting game in which the South Africans, having matched England in the first innings, were saved from what Wisden saw as likely defeat by bad light in the second innings; Deane failed in both innings. Depleted by injuries, the South Africans were beaten in the third Test despite a last-wicket stand of 103 between Tuppy Owen-Smith and Sandy Bell, with Deane again making little impression as a batsman, and the fourth Test was a heavier defeat, with England losing only seven wickets and winning by an innings. With the series now lost, Deane came into better form himself, making his only century of the tour, an unbeaten 133, in the game against Hampshire, scoring his runs in 140 minutes. That innings led to him batting at No 5 in the fifth and final Test; in South Africa's only innings of the match, he came to the wicket to join Herby Taylor with the score at 25 for three, and the pair added 214 in 190 minutes before Deane was out for 93, his best Test innings; the game finished as a draw. Wisden wrote: "The batting of both men reached a very high standard and, coming as it did in such circumstances, was easily the best in point of class and skill shown by the South Africans in the whole series of Tests." Deane finished the tour with 1239 first-class runs and an average of 34.41.

Deane played very little further first-class cricket after this tour, appearing in just two matches in the 1929–30 season in South Africa. In 1930–31, England toured South Africa; Deane did not play in the first Test of a five-match series. His replacement as captain was Buster Nupen and his 11 wickets for 150 runs in the match won the game narrowly for South Africa. "Had Deane been persuaded to play, Nupen would not have been in the team," Wisden noted. Deane then returned to captain the South African team in the second and third Tests, achieving little himself with the bat in either game, but drawing both matches, so that South Africa preserved their lead and went on to win the series 1–0. After the third Test, Deane again stood down, being replaced as captain by wicketkeeper Jock Cameron, and he did not play any further Test or first-class cricket. Having been a member of the selection committee in both 1929 and 1930–31, he was also a selector for the 1931–32 tour of Australia and New Zealand.

== Death and legacy ==
Deane suddenly died 21 October 1939 in Johannesburg, Transvaal, at the age of 44 after a heart attack. Wisden wrote of him in its obituary column that "there can be no doubt that his inspiration and careful team-building were chiefly responsible for the improvement in South African cricket of recent years."
