= Buster Nupen =

South African cricketer

Personal information
- Full name: Eiulf Peter Nupen
- Born: 1 January 1902 near Ålesund, Norway
- Died: 29 January 1977 (aged 75); Johannesburg, South Africa
- Batting: Right-handed
- Bowling: Right-arm fast-medium
- Role: Bowler

International information
- National side: South Africa
- Test debut: 5 November 1921 v Australia
- Last Test: 15 February 1936 v Australia

Domestic team information
- Years: Team
- 1920/21–1936/37: Transvaal

Career statistics
Competition	Test	First-class
Matches	17	74
Runs scored	348	1,635
Batting average	14.50	17.96
100s/50s	0/2	0/8
Top score	69	89
Balls bowled	4,159	14,210
Wickets	50	334
Bowling average	35.75	18.19
5 wickets in innings	5	33
10 wickets in match	1	12
Best bowling	6/46	9/48
Catches/stumpings	9/–	34/–
- Source: CricInfo, 17 November 2020

Eiulf Peter "Buster" Nupen (1 January 1902 – 29 January 1977) was a cricketer who played in 17 Test matches for South Africa between 1921–22 and 1935–36. He was born in Norway, lost an eye in a childhood accident, and was shot through both knees during the Rand Rebellion when he was 20.

A deadly force for Transvaal against lesser batsmen on matting wickets during the late 1920s – by which time his bowling on these wickets had been developed into a fine art – in 1930–31 Nupen was, owing to the absence of South Africa's former captain Nummy Deane due to poor form, chosen to captain the Test team against England. He did so with considerable skill and accomplished the best bowling of his Test career. He took 5 for 63 and 6 for 87 in the First Test to give South Africa victory by 28 runs, and 3 for 148 and 6 for 46 in the drawn Fourth Test. However, Nupen was thought so badly of on turf pitches that he was left out of the Third and Fifth Tests, the first two played on turf in South Africa. He achieved his best-ever domestic figures the following year with 43 wickets for 434 runs (including 9 for 48 and 7 for 88 in a match against Griqualand West). In 28 Currie Cup matches for Transvaal he took 190 wickets at an average of 12.92, nine times taking 10 or more wickets in a match.

He was educated at King Edward VII School (Johannesburg) and practised as an attorney in Johannesburg for 45 years.
