= Fred Trueman =

English cricketer (1931–2006)

Fred Trueman OBE
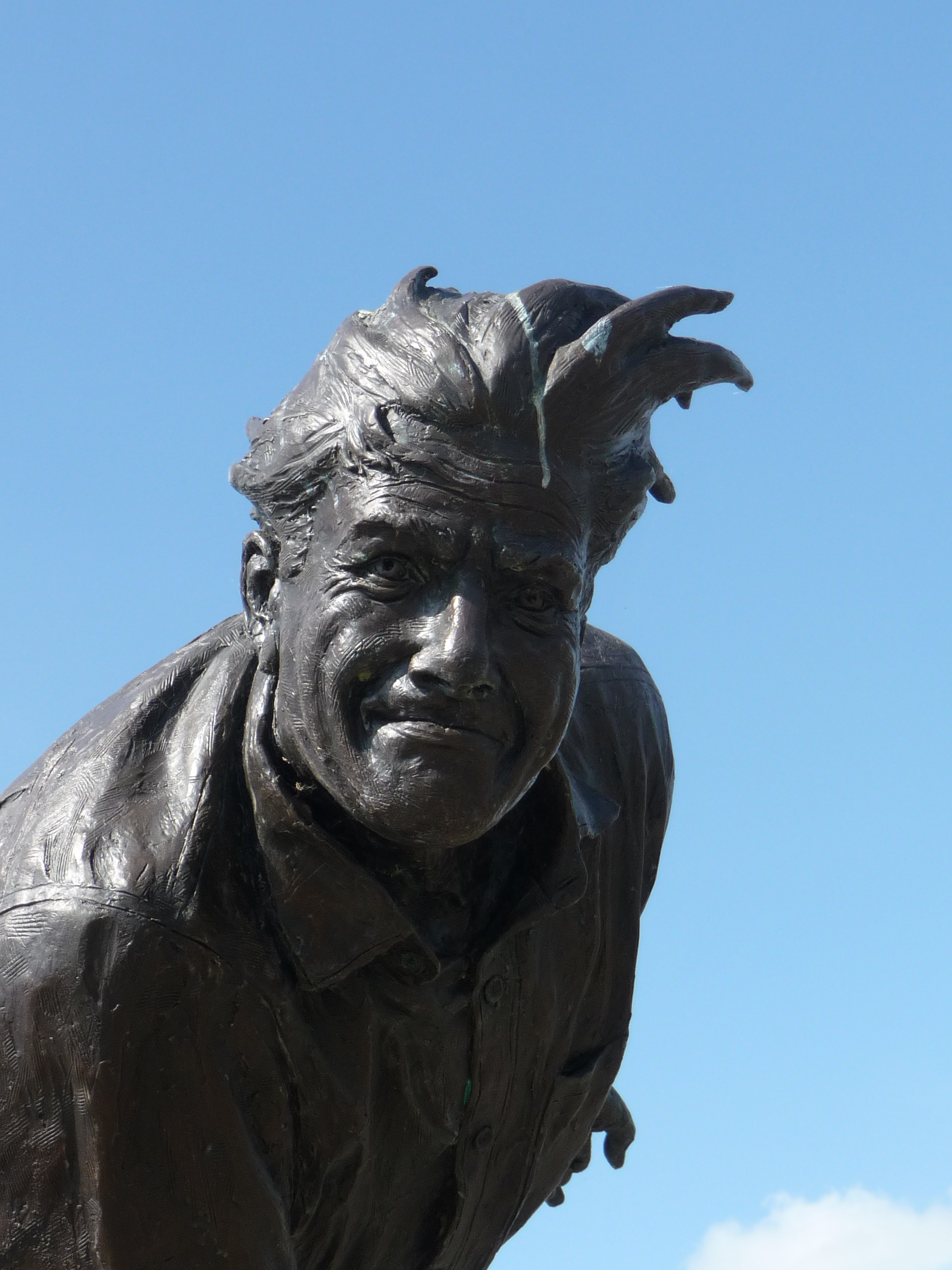
- Statue of Trueman in Skipton by Graham Ibbeson

Personal information
- Full name: Frederick Sewards Trueman
- Born: 6 February 1931; Scotch Springs, Stainton, West Riding of Yorkshire, England
- Died: 1 July 2006 (aged 75); Steeton with Eastburn, West Yorkshire, England
- Nickname: Fiery Fred
- Height: 5 ft 10 in (1.78 m)
- Batting: Right-handed
- Bowling: Right-arm fast
- Role: Bowler

International information
- National side: England
- Test debut (cap 369): 5 June 1952 v India
- Last Test: 17 June 1965 v New Zealand

Domestic team information
- Years: Team
- 1949–1968: Yorkshire
- 1972: Derbyshire

Career statistics
Competition	Test	FC	LA
Matches	67	603	18
Runs scored	981	9,231	156
Batting average	13.81	15.56	13.00
100s/50s	0/0	3/26	0/0
Top score	39*	104	28
Balls bowled	15,178	99,701	986
Wickets	307	2,304	28
Bowling average	21.57	18.29	18.10
5 wickets in innings	17	126	1
10 wickets in match	3	25	0
Best bowling	8/31	8/28	6/15
Catches/stumpings	64/–	439/–	5/–
- Source: ESPNcricinfo, 18 March 2018

Frederick Sewards Trueman, OBE (6 February 1931 – 1 July 2006) was an English cricketer who played for Yorkshire County Cricket Club and the England cricket team. He had professional status and later became an author and broadcaster.

Acknowledged as one of the greatest bowlers in cricket's history, Trueman deployed a genuinely fast pace and was widely known as "Fiery Fred". He was the first bowler to take 300 wickets in a Test career. Together with Brian Statham, he opened the England bowling for many years and they formed one of the most famous bowling partnerships in Test cricket history. Trueman was an outstanding fielder, especially at leg slip, and a useful late order batsman who made three first-class centuries. He was awarded his Yorkshire county cap in 1951 and in 1952 was elected "Young Cricketer of the Year" by the Cricket Writers' Club. For his performances in the 1952 season, he was named one of the Wisden Cricketers of the Year in the 1953 edition of Wisden Cricketers' Almanack.

His talent, skill and public profile were such that British Prime Minister Harold Wilson, himself from Yorkshire, jokingly described him as the "greatest living Yorkshireman". Even so, Trueman was omitted from numerous England teams because he was frequently in conflict with the cricket establishment, which he often criticised for its perceived "snobbishness" and hypocrisy. After he retired from playing, he became a media personality through his work in television and as an outspoken radio commentator for the BBC, mainly working on Test Match Special. He was awarded the OBE in the 1989 Birthday Honours for services to cricket. In 2009, Trueman was inducted into the ICC Cricket Hall of Fame.

On the occasion of England's 1000th Test in August 2018, he was named in the country's greatest Test XI by the ECB.

== Early life and career ==
=== Childhood ===
Fred Trueman was born at no. 5, Scotch Spring Lane, Stainton near Maltby, West Riding of Yorkshire. He said himself that he weighed 14 lb 1 oz (6.4 kg) at birth and was delivered by his maternal grandmother Mrs Stimpson. Her maiden name was Sewards and Trueman's parents decided to honour her by naming him Frederick Sewards Trueman. Not long before his death in 2006, Trueman appeared to discover that Mrs Stimpson was Jewish. He said that he was happy to be considered Jewish but joked that he would be very reluctant to give up on bacon sandwiches. Chris Waters' 2011 biography states this claim to be untrue and that Elizabeth Stimpson's natural parents were a couple from Lincolnshire with no Jewish connections.

His parents were Alan and Ethel Trueman and he was the middle one of seven children. They were a country family, their home being part of a terrace row called Scotch Springs (now demolished) that was surrounded by countryside but about a mile from Maltby Main Colliery and half a mile from Stainton village. Trueman's grandfather had been a horse dealer and his father worked primarily with horses too, though for a time he was a coalface worker at Maltby Main. His parents instilled into all the children a strong sense of discipline and the values of honesty and forthrightness.

Trueman's education began at the village school in Stainton where his teachers recognised his talent for cricket. Encouraged by his father, he had started bowling when he was four. His father was captain of the Stainton club and Trueman used to accompany him to matches, once playing for the club when he was only eight years old. When Trueman was twelve years old, the family moved to a larger house on Tennyson Road in nearby Maltby, where Trueman attended Maltby Secondary School.

=== Development as a cricketer ===
At Maltby Secondary School, Trueman had two teachers called Dickie Harrison and Tommy Stubbs who recognised his talent as a bowler and picked him for the school team, even though he was much younger than the other players. His school playing career was interrupted for two years after he was seriously injured by a cricket ball that hit him in the groin. He started playing again in 1945 when he was fourteen but left school that summer to start work, initially in a newsagent. He had several jobs before becoming a professional cricketer. Inhibited by his injury, Trueman might have given up on cricket at this time but instead, motivated by his family, he joined a nearby village club called Roche Abbey, playing regularly for them in 1946. He was successful at Roche Abbey and, before the 1947 season when he was sixteen, came to the notice of former Yorkshire player Cyril Turner who was coaching the Sheffield United Cricket Club which played at Bramall Lane, a ground then in regular use by Yorkshire for first-class cricket.

In his autobiography, Trueman acknowledged his debt to Cyril Turner, "a superb coach", who taught him how to "hold the ball properly", enable it to swing both ways and how to follow through properly to complete his bowling action. Trueman played some matches for Sheffield United's Second XI team in the 1947 season and was then promoted to the first team so that he could play in the Yorkshire Council League. The following winter, he received an invitation from Yorkshire to attend indoor coaching classes at Headingley, Leeds, under the supervision of Bill Bowes and Arthur Mitchell.

Before the 1948 season began, Trueman was selected by Yorkshire for the Yorkshire Federation team for players under eighteen, effectively the county's third team. The team toured the south of England and it was on this tour that Trueman met two of his future Yorkshire colleagues, Brian Close and Ray Illingworth. He enjoyed a successful season with Sheffield, saying that "the year 1948 proved a good one for me". He had already met a number of great Yorkshire players including George Hirst and he was delighted by an end of season newspaper report in which Herbert Sutcliffe predicted that Trueman would play for Yorkshire before he was nineteen and for England before he was twenty-one.

As the 1949 season began, Trueman was surprised to receive a telegram from Yorkshire which told him he had been chosen to play for the first team in the opening first-class matches against Cambridge University at Fenner's and Oxford University at the Parks.

== First-class and international cricket career ==
=== Beginnings: 1949 to 1951 ===
Trueman made his first-class debut on Wednesday, 11 May 1949 in the three-day match against Cambridge which Yorkshire won by 9 wickets. He was mistakenly described as a spin bowler in the Wisden match report. Opening the bowling in both innings with Brian Close, who was medium pace, Trueman took two for 72 and one for 22 as Cambridge were dismissed for 283 and 196 respectively. Yorkshire scored 317 for six declared and 164 for one so Trueman, who was number 11 in the order, did not bat. Trueman's first wicket was that of opening batsman Robert Morris, who was caught by Ellis Robinson for 19. In the second innings, Trueman bowled the future Sussex and England batsman Hubert Doggart for 23. Three other debutants that day who all became England players were Close and opening batsman Frank Lowson for Yorkshire; and Middlesex fast bowler John Warr for Cambridge. Many years later, Warr wrote the biographical piece about Trueman in Barclays World of Cricket. Trueman had match figures of six for 72 in his second match against Oxford, which Yorkshire lost by 69 runs. A month later, he took eight for 70 against the Minor Counties on his first appearance at Lord's, bowling unchanged through the second innings. Commenting on his first County Championship match, against Surrey at Park Avenue, Bradford, Wisden said that he bowled "fast and with effect".

As with most of their young players, Yorkshire intended to take their time over establishing Trueman and were prepared to set him aside for lengthy periods. The established pace bowlers in 1949 were Alec Coxon and Ron Aspinall, both fast-medium, while captain Norman Yardley was a "capable third seam bowler". History was against Trueman as the county rarely looked for fast bowlers with express speed, instead preferring "the medium or fast-medium bowler with his capacity for control, economy and long spells". Trueman, once he became established, was a clear breach of Yorkshire tradition.

The great Yorkshire team of the 1930s had been broken up by the Second World War and a rebuilding phase was underway by the late 1940s, although Yorkshire had won the first post-war County Championship in 1946. Norman Yardley succeeded Brian Sellers as captain in 1948 and his main team members that season were Len Hutton, Ted Lester, Harry Halliday, Vic Wilson, Willie Watson, Frank Smailes, Johnny Wardle, Don Brennan (wicket-keeper), Ellis Robinson, Ron Aspinall and Alex Coxon. Others in the picture were future captain Billy Sutcliffe and two more young fast-medium bowlers, Bill Foord and Johnny Whitehead. The main team changes in 1949 were the retirement of Frank Smailes; the immediate establishment of Close and Lowson, who played in 22 and 24 championship matches respectively while Trueman only played in four; and an injury to Aspinall who was restricted to just three games. Aspinall had taken thirty wickets in his three matches and had been picked for a Test Trial but, at the end of May, he ruptured an Achilles tendon and was out of action for the rest of the season; indeed, he was never an effective bowler again.

Yorkshire initially replaced Aspinall with Frank McHugh, but then brought Trueman back in June before dropping him in July in order to try out Foord and Whitehead. Trueman was recalled to play against the New Zealand tourists at Bramall Lane later in July but his debut season ended there and then as he sustained a thigh injury and had to be carried off the field. He could only watch from the sidelines as Yorkshire took part in "a fine struggle" for the championship which, in the end, they shared with Middlesex, both teams earning 192 points. He played in eight first-class matches in 1949, all for Yorkshire; in five matches for the Second XI in the Minor Counties Championship; and in one other match for Yorkshire's first team against an Army XI which included another up and coming fast bowler, Frank Tyson.

The third issue of Playfair Cricket Annual in 1950 said that Trueman was "built for the job of a fast 'un, and with the spirit too" but added that "Yorkshire will not hasten his development or that of any other promising player". Trueman in his autobiography was highly critical of this policy and says that on at least one occasion he remonstrated fiercely with his captain about being left out of the first team. Having called him a "fast 'un" in its Yorkshire section, Playfair in its "Who's Who" section incorrectly described Trueman as "a promising RFM" (i.e., fast medium bowler). Trueman's oft-stated view of himself was "the best bloody English fast bowler that ever drew bloody breath".

Trueman's first match in the 1950 season was for Yorkshire against the West Indies tourists at Park Avenue. He made twelve appearances in the County Championship and played for "The Rest" against England in a Test trial. He made only one appearance for the Second XI. On the face of it, and certainly in terms of his bowling figures to date, it was a surprise that Trueman was selected for the Test Trial. Wisden said that this was "a match immortalised by Jim Laker's eight for two". Trueman's inclusion was designed to give the England batsmen practice against fast bowling even though, at this period of his career, he was inaccurate in both length and direction. The selectors were driven by the repeated discomfiture of England batsmen against the great Australian bowlers Ray Lindwall and Keith Miller, but John Arlott suspected there was also a subconscious urge to "reflect public feeling, the national desire for a fast bowler, even an inexperienced one – anyone so long as he was fast".

1950 was a frustrating season for Trueman who was straining to establish himself in the Yorkshire team. The club committee, however, persisted in a policy of short-term usage followed by a period of discard while they looked at Whitehead. Trueman faced the added problem of trying to succeed in an atmosphere of prevailing "discontent in the dressing room" which amounted to much more than a typical "them and us" situation between players and committee. Trueman said that the team itself was "split into cliques", specifically the "gentlemen players" and one or two senior professionals like Hutton, who had social ambitions, on the one hand; and the younger professionals like himself, Close, Illingworth and Lowson on the other. The situation was exacerbated by bad feeling between some of the professionals, Wardle in particular being a difficult person to have in a team. Although he was fast, Trueman was often wayward and sometimes expensive. These "negatives assumed great importance" in such a dour and unforgiving atmosphere. On Trueman's debit side, some of his colleagues perceived him to be "loud-mouthed and seemingly insensitive".

Trueman was downhearted enough at this time to even think about joining Yorkshire's traditional rivals Lancashire. But at the end of the season, he went back to the winter nets where he listened to Bowes and Mitchell, practised, kept himself fit and looked forward with increasing determination to the future. Trueman was an "apt pupil" and Bowes said of him: "He had the three great assets for the job: a love of fast bowling, a powerful physique and a smooth cartwheel action".

Yorkshire finished third in the County Championship, twenty points adrift of the joint winners Lancashire and Surrey. For the most part, Yorkshire selected from fifteen players in 1950 although a few others made occasional appearances. Yardley captained the team in which Hutton and Lowson were the established openers although, with Hutton's Test calls, there were more opportunities for Halliday and Geoffrey Keighley. Lester, Watson, Wilson and Billy Sutcliffe were the other batsmen and Brennan was the wicket-keeper. The main bowlers were Wardle, Coxon and Eddie Leadbeater. Brian Close was doing his national service and could only make a single appearance, Ellis Robinson had departed and Ron Aspinall's career had been wrecked by his injury. So Trueman and Whitehead, who made 13 appearances, contested the fourth bowling place but one of the bit players was Bob Appleyard, who would make a major impact in 1951.

The next stage in Trueman's development was to harness his speed and exercise full control of the ball. This was what Bowes and Mitchell worked on in 1950–51 and "the improvement in his bowling was immediately noticeable". Whereas in 1949 and 1950 he had taken 31 wickets in both seasons, he took 90 in 1951 including five wickets in an innings six times. His best analysis of the season was eight for 53 against Nottinghamshire at Trent Bridge when he captured his first hat-trick by making the ball swing with devastating effect, Yorkshire winning by 9 wickets. His hat-trick victims were Reg Simpson, Alan Armitage and Peter Harvey.

All four of Trueman's career hat-tricks were taken for Yorkshire and this is a county record he shares with George Macaulay. The hat-trick match was the second time Trueman had destroyed the Nottinghamshire batting that season. A month earlier at Bramall Lane, he had taken three for 26 and eight for 68, enabling Yorkshire to win by an innings and 33 runs. According to Wisden, Trueman "bowled at very fast pace and frequently made the ball fly".

Trueman might have expected that eleven-wicket haul at Bramall Lane to firmly establish his place in the Yorkshire first-team but his immediate reward was to be rested and given twelfth man duties with the Second XI, who were playing against Lincolnshire at Cleethorpes Sports Ground. To be fair to Yorkshire, the teams for the subsequent first and second XI matches had already been chosen before he took his eight for 68. He quickly swallowed his disappointment and his eight for 53 at Trent Bridge was summarised by one of his biographers Don Mosey as "the start of the Trueman era".

Despite their internal problems and disharmony, Yorkshire finished second behind Warwickshire in the County Championship. One of the problem players, Alex Coxon, surprisingly resigned after the 1950 season and it was widely said that "his face did not fit", even though he was a top-class bowler who had played for England. Brian Close made only two appearances as he completed his national service; and Ray Illingworth made his debut but played in only the one match. With Johnny Whitehead playing only seven times, Yorkshire relied mainly on a squad of 13 players including Trueman, who played in 26 championship matches. The other twelve regulars were Yardley (captain), Hutton, Lowson, Lester, Watson, Wilson, Halliday, Sutcliffe, Brennan, Wardle, Leadbeater and Appleyard. On Monday, 13 August 1951, Trueman and Bob Appleyard were awarded their county caps by team captain Norman Yardley.

=== National service in the RAF: 1951 to 1953 ===
Since his first involvement with Yorkshire in 1948, Trueman had been working a winter job at Maltby Main in the tally office (contrary to one of the urban legend about him, he was never actually a miner). Yorkshire had encouraged him to work for the National Coal Board so that he would be in a reserved occupation and so avoid national service. In the winter of 1950–51, he learned that his job was to be declassified and that he would be liable for call-up at some stage. He decided to volunteer after the 1951 season and, at the same time, take advantage of a new Yorkshire committee ruling that any capped players who were called up would be paid £5 a week, which was a good wage at the time.

Trueman undertook his national service in the Royal Air Force at RAF Hemswell in Lincolnshire. At that stage, according to Wisden, "the RAF was probably less hierarchical than Yorkshire County Cricket Club, and he coped with the vagaries of service life rather better than he did with the Yorkshire committee". He was there through the next two seasons until he was demobilised at the end of the 1953 season. During this time he made his Test debut for England against India in 1952 and took part in the 1953 Ashes series against Australia.

He was fortunate in having a station commander in Group Captain Jim Warfield who was a cricket enthusiast and was willing to grant him leave for Test and occasional county matches. In addition, Warfield decided to employ Trueman in the sports section, looking after the equipment and playing fields. Nevertheless, this relaxation of the usual rules caused questions to be raised in the House of Commons after the mother of another conscript complained to her local MP that her son had been refused leave to take part in a national banjo playing championship. Trueman claimed that he was the first person to be mentioned in Hansard in a cricketing connection. His identity in the RAF was AC2 F. S. Trueman 2549485. He was later promoted to AC1.

National service restricted Trueman to just nine first-class matches in 1952 but four of them were Tests. He made his debut for England on Thursday, 5 June in the first Test against India at Headingley. Len Hutton had been appointed England captain before the series as the first professional to hold the post in the 20th century and the first ever to hold it in a home series. The appointment was controversial, especially among the amateur establishment, but Hutton had "an easy initiation against a weak Indian team, who did not relish the tearaway bowling of the young Trueman". England, for whom Trueman opened the bowling with Alec Bedser, won the match in four days by 7 wickets. After taking three for 89 in the first innings when India scored 293, Trueman produced a sensational opening spell in the second innings and, after only 14 balls had been bowled, India were reduced to none for four, Trueman taking three of the wickets. He finished with four for 27 as India recovered to score 165. England had made 334 in the first innings and a second innings total of 128 for three secured the win. England won the second Test at Lord's by 8 wickets. Trueman, again opening the bowling with Bedser, took four for 72 and four for 110. In the third Test at Old Trafford, England won by an innings and 207 runs with Trueman taking eight for 31 and one for 9. The fourth and final Test at the Oval was ruined by rain and drawn after England scored 326 for six declared and India had been bowled out for only 98. Trueman with five for 48 and Bedser with five for 41 were almost unplayable. Trueman's tally of wickets in his debut series was therefore 29. He had a problem during the season in "a tendency to get stitch", which was diagnosed as "a lack of regular fast bowling exercise".

In the 1952 County Championship, Yorkshire made a strong challenge but ultimately finished as runners-up to Stuart Surridge's great Surrey team which began a remarkable run of seven consecutive titles to 1958. Trueman was restricted to five championship appearances but Yorkshire did get Brian Close back from his national service. Yardley was again the captain and the other mainstays were Hutton, Lowson, Lester, Halliday, Wilson, Watson, Sutcliffe, Brennan, Wardle, Leadbeater and the fast-medium bowler Bill Holdsworth who was effectively Trueman's stand-in. Holdsworth played 24 matches in 1952 and 1953 only; but never again after Trueman returned to full-time action in 1954.

As a result of his fine performances in 1952, mainly in Test cricket against India, Trueman was voted the Young Cricketer of the Year by the Cricket Writers' Club. The following spring, he was named as one of the Cricketers of the Year for 1952 by Wisden Cricketers' Almanack in its 1953 edition (the other four were Harold Gimblett, Tom Graveney, David Sheppard and Stuart Surridge). Wisden said of Trueman in its dedication that he "is 5 ft 10½ in. and weighs 13st 9lbs" and "gives promise of becoming a second Harold Larwood". Having mentioned his problem with "stitch", Wisden remarked that "it is doubtful whether Trueman has reached the stage of physical development to bowl the long spells which may be necessary against Test batsmen of the highest class". While Yorkshire thought Trueman would need two more seasons "before he can do everything asked", England certainly possess "the best fast bowling prospect in years" and Wisden followed this comment with a direct comparison of Trueman's attributes with those of Larwood.

Writing in 1999, Derek Birley said of Trueman at this pivotal moment in his career that he was "still learning his craft and, rather more slowly, how to behave". Birley viewed Trueman as "an early cricketing example of a post-war phenomenon, the brash and undisciplined youth tolerated for his talent – the anti-hero". Birley admitted that Trueman eventually became "an immensely popular public figure" thanks to his "rudimentary sense of humour, prodigious memory and forthright views", all of which made him a media favourite on the one hand but, on the other, the same qualities made him "less popular on the county cricket circuit", where he was "dreaded off the field like the Ancient Mariner".

Trueman played football for Lincoln City during his national service. He played for RAF Hemswell in the 1952–53 season and was spotted by Lincoln City manager Bill Anderson, who invited him to play for the Lincoln reserves. Trueman was a forward, playing either as a striker or on the wing. Given the publicity he had received after his performances in the 1952 Test series, there was a lot of public interest in his football and Lincoln's attendances increased considerably when he was playing. Eventually, Bill Anderson offered him professional terms but Trueman decided to concentrate on cricket and, aware of the risk to his Test and county career if he sustained a football injury, he declined.

The highlight of the 1953 season, for Trueman and all other England cricket followers, was the series victory over Australia that enabled England to win the Ashes for the first time since the bodyline series in 1932–33. Trueman missed the first four Tests, which were all drawn, and played in the last at the Oval which England won by 8 wickets, partly thanks to him taking four important wickets. "Erratic, yes; wild, most certainly; but full of fire and dynamite", wrote Jack Fingleton.

Yorkshire by contrast had a poor season, though it could partly be excused by the impact of Test calls, injuries and Trueman's national service. They dropped to twelfth place in the County Championship, which was then their lowest-ever position. Ray Illingworth, who had made only a handful of appearances previously, was an ever-present in Yorkshire's championship team in 1953 and other young prospects making progress were Mike Cowan, Doug Padgett, Bryan Stott and Ken Taylor. Otherwise, the mainstays were as before: Yardley, Hutton, Lowson, Lester, Halliday, Watson, Wilson, Sutcliffe, Brennan and Wardle. Close played in only two matches and Trueman in ten. Bill Holdsworth made 14 appearances and Bill Foord, in his last season before finally deciding to be a schoolteacher, made 22.

=== Clashes with authority: 1954 to 1956 ===
Trueman's first overseas tour, to the West Indies, took place the following winter (1953–54) after he was demobilised by the RAF. He played in eight first-class matches, including three of the five Tests, and took 27 wickets at 33.66 with a best effort of five for 45. It was a controversial tour and its ramifications had an adverse impact on Trueman's international career during the next few years. MCC at the outset were "riddled with anxiety" about sending a team abroad under a professional captain but could hardly deny Hutton his right having just won the Ashes. England had a very strong team in which the main bowlers were Trevor Bailey, Jim Laker, Tony Lock, Johnny Wardle, Brian Statham and Trueman. On the other hand, there were some strong characters in the team coupled with weak management.

Hutton discouraged fraternisation with the West Indies players and this went decidedly against Trueman's grain, given that he was a gregarious character who liked nothing better than to fraternise. Trueman had made friends with Frank Worrell and other West Indian players when he met them in English league cricket and objected strongly to Hutton's policy, claiming that he was not alone in this and especially as Hutton gave no reason for it. Trueman suspected the MCC hierarchy (i.e., Allen, Brown, etc.) of instructing Hutton to make the demand. For his own part, he would not allow anyone to dictate to him with whom he should be friends. West Indian writer C. L. R. James commented on the 1953–54 English team that it was "actively disliked". He said that this was "not due merely to unsportsmanlike behaviour by individuals" but that there was "evidence to show" that the team was there primarily to "establish the prestige of Great Britain, and by that, of the local whites".

Trueman quickly alienated the West Indian crowds who disliked his belligerent style, especially when he followed instructions and did not show sympathy for batsmen he had hit with the ball. The West Indian fans nicknamed him ""Mr Bumper Man" and someone wrote a calypso about him that was based on the sea shanty Drunken Sailor. He fell foul of off-field incidents too, including one in which he and Tony Lock were blamed for something done by Denis Compton who, as the "golden boy" of English cricket, was effectively beyond reproach. It was while the team was in Barbados that one of the most repeated "Trueman stories" is said to have originated, although it is almost certainly apocryphal. At a dinner, Trueman is said to have ordered a local dignitary, apparently the Indian High Commissioner: "Pass t'salt, Gunga Din". At the end of the tour, to his outrage, Trueman had his good-conduct bonus docked. No reason was given and he tried without success to obtain one, but neither Hutton nor MCC would elaborate. Trueman never forgave Hutton and the two never played together for England again.

Trueman played in the first Test at Sabina Park but, with figures of two for 107 and none for 32, he proved expensive and West Indies won by 140 runs. He was omitted from the team for both the second and third Tests but then recalled for the fourth at Queen's Park Oval which was drawn; Trueman again struggled and had a return of one for 131 in the first innings as West Indies amassed 681 for eight declared, all of the famous "Three Ws" scoring centuries: Everton Weekes 206, Frank Worrell 167 and Clyde Walcott 124. Trueman was retained for the final Test at Sabina Park which England won by nine wickets to square the series two apiece. He opened the bowling with Bailey and returned figures of two for 39 and three for 88, while Bailey produced a match-winning seven for 34 in the first innings when West Indies were all out for only 139.

Back in England after the 1953–54 tour, Trueman in 1954 was able to play a full season for the first time since 1951. Jim Kilburn wrote that, at the age of 23, Trueman "had acquired a man's physique for fast bowling that questioned the courage as well as the technique of opposing batsmen". He played in 33 matches and, for the first time, exceeded 100 wickets in a season. His tally was 134 at 15.55 with a best return of eight for 28. Yorkshire probably should have won the County Championship in 1954 having won six of their first seven matches but were badly hit by wet weather in August and finished runners-up behind Surrey. Trueman and the medium-paced Appleyard formed an effective combination, backed up by Wardle's spin, and Yorkshire had a strong bowling team. The rest of the team mostly comprised Hutton, Lowson, Yardley, Lester, Watson, Vic Wilson, Close, Illingworth and wicket-keeper Roy Booth.

Arlott mentions the hard work put in by Trueman to improve his bowling, first by "smoothing out the last minor unevenness in his run-up" and then by achieving increased accuracy. Trueman said in his autobiography that Yorkshire in the early to mid-1950s were constantly let down by divisions in the team, blaming both Yardley and Hutton for the problems. Re the situation in 1954, he specifically mentions Yardley's inability to deal with the attitudes of Wardle and Appleyard.

Despite his excellent form for Yorkshire in 1954, there was no place for Trueman in any of the Test matches against Pakistan, nor was he selected for the tour of Australia and New Zealand the following winter. He became engaged to his first wife, Enid Chapman, in September 1954 and they married in March 1955. He worked as a furniture salesman through the winter months.

Trueman had a problem with so-called "drag" in 1955 when he was no-balled twice for not having his rear foot behind the bowling crease when he released the ball (i.e., he had dragged his back foot over the line before completing delivery). To remedy this, he reduced his run up by six yards, and with no apparent loss of pace. Yorkshire were involved in a two-horse race for the County Championship but were again let down by one poor spell, this time in June, and had to settle for second place as Surrey won a fourth consecutive title. With Appleyard ill, Trueman and Wardle shared the main weight of the bowling with support from Close. As Arlott points out, Yorkshire had a "serious weakness" in the lack of a regular fast bowling partner for Trueman. The situation was alleviated when Cowan was available, but his appearances were limited by national service and then by a back injury sustained on the MCC tour of Pakistan in 1955–56. There were some signs of change, most notably with the arrival of Jimmy Binks as wicket-keeper and, with more appearances by Doug Padgett and Ken Taylor, the 1960s team was beginning to take shape. Appleyard, Hutton and Lester were less active than before. Otherwise, the mainstays with Trueman were Close, Illingworth, Lowson, Billy Sutcliffe, Wardle, Watson, Vic Wilson and Yardley.

Trueman did force his way back into the England team for the second Test at Lord's in 1955, when England defeated South Africa by 71 runs. Opening the bowling with Statham, he took two for 73, which was expensive, and none for 39 while Statham won the match for England with two for 49 and a brilliant seven for 39. That was Trueman's only Test in 1955 as Frank Tyson was recalled for the third Test at Old Trafford. There was no Test tour in 1955–56 so Trueman had to wait a whole year for his next chance to play for England.

The Australians visited England in 1956 and, Peter May having succeeded Hutton as England captain, Trueman was recalled for two Tests. In the second at Lord's, which Australia won by 185 runs, he opened the bowling with Statham and took two for 54 and five for 90. During the second innings, he took his 50th wicket in Test cricket when he had Keith Miller caught behind, but Miller had the last laugh as his ten-wicket haul won the match for Australia. Trueman had done enough to retain his place for the third Test at Headingley where England won by an innings and 42 runs. It was a spinner's wicket and 18 of the Australian wickets fell to Laker and Lock. Trueman opened the bowling with Bailey and took one for 19 and one for 21, dismissing Colin McDonald in both innings. Brian Statham returned for the now legendary fourth Test at Old Trafford, taking Trueman's place and opening the bowling with Bailey, but no pace bowlers were needed here for this was "Laker's Match", the Surrey off-spinner taking an unparalleled 19 wickets in the match.

Trueman made 31 first-class appearances in 1956 but had difficulty with a persistent strain in his left side, exacerbated by occasional sciatica, and he reverted to his long run after more problems with drag at the start of the season. Yorkshire's team underwent change before the season began with the retirements of Hutton and Yardley. Yardley was succeeded as captain by Billy Sutcliffe, with whom Trueman had a good relationship. Rain badly affected the County Championship and Yorkshire managed only eight wins in their 28 matches to finish seventh. With Trueman largely ineffective due to his injury, the bowling was carried by Appleyard, Wardle and the emerging Ray Illingworth. Binks, Illingworth and Vic Wilson played in all of Yorkshire's 28 championship matches in 1956. The other essential players, besides Trueman when fit, were Appleyard, Close, Lowson, Padgett, Sutcliffe, Taylor, Wardle and Watson.

Trueman was not included in the 1956–57 tour of South Africa, in which England relied for pace on Bailey, Statham, Tyson and Peter Loader. To keep his name in the frame, Trueman accepted an invitation to make a short tour of India with C. G. Howard's XI, which played two matches between 30 December and 8 January. Howard's team included Alec Bedser, Tom Graveney, Bill Edrich, Reg Simpson, Willie Watson and the Australians Bruce Dooland and Colin McCool. The two matches, played in Calcutta and Bombay, were to celebrate the Silver Jubilee of the Cricket Association of Bengal, Trueman taking eight wickets and achieving top score in one innings when he struck a rapid 46 not out.

=== The great Test bowler: 1957 to 1964 ===
In 1952, after Trueman's early success against India, Len Hutton had commented that he needed another five years to mature as a bowler; and it was in 1957 that Trueman returned to the fore and finally became an established England player. He overcame his side strain and recovered his form, taking 27 wickets in his first four matches. New regulations about time-wasting caused him to reconsider his run up which he limited to eighteen yards.

Trueman was selected for the first Test against West Indies and kept his place for the entire series. He was England's leading wicket-taker with 22 at 20.68. His great partnership with Statham began in earnest and for six years the pair were a formidable presence in international cricket, Statham noted for his accuracy and persistence, Trueman for his rhythm and dynamics. Trueman's selection in this series can be put into some perspective by the fact that his great rival Frank Tyson achieved 100 wickets in a season for the first time, yet Trueman was now clearly considered England's best option to partner Statham. As Arlott recounts, the third Test at Trent Bridge featured "one of the finest sustained bowling performances of Trueman's life". In a high-scoring match which was eventually drawn, Trueman and Statham took 15 wickets between them from a combined 135 overs, which is a considerable total for two pace bowlers. In the context of the match, they were both outstanding and their joint performance was acclaimed as the first major success in a partnership that the selectors now regarded as long-term. England did not have an overseas tour in the winter of 1957–58.

Trueman played in 32 first-class matches in 1957, taking 135 wickets. He had an outstanding time in his favoured leg slip position, holding 36 catches. There were more problems in the Yorkshire dressing room, principally a petition started by certain players for the club committee to sack Billy Sutcliffe from the captaincy. Trueman refused to sign it but, in August, Sutcliffe decided to resign. Despite this, Yorkshire still managed to finish third, though a long way behind champions Surrey. Yorkshire's main players in 1957 were Appleyard, Binks, Close, Illingworth, Lowson, Padgett, Sutcliffe, Taylor, Trueman, Wardle, Watson, and Vic Wilson.

Ronnie Burnet was Yorkshire's new captain in 1958. Not an accomplished player, though he had previously captained the club's Second XI, he was a good man-manager and a firm disciplinarian who could get the best out of what was to be a new team in which Trueman was, apart from Brian Close and Vic Wilson, the most experienced player. Burnet set the tone in 1958 with the sacking of Wardle for disciplinary reasons. The other perceived "trouble-maker", Appleyard, lost his ability as a result of his illnesses, and Yorkshire released him mid-season. Although the team could only finish 11th in the County Championship, having lost 24 full days to poor weather, the dressing room was much happier. Regular team members now included Binks, Brian Bolus, Burnet, Close, Cowan, Trueman, Illingworth, Lowson, Padgett, David Pickles, Phil Sharpe, Stott, Taylor, Trueman, Don Wilson, and Vic Wilson. As John Arlott said, the great Yorkshire team of the 1960s was beginning to take shape.

Trueman played in all five Tests against New Zealand in 1958, taking 15 wickets in the series at an average of 17.06. This was a wet summer and most of the bowling in the series was done by spinners, but he still managed five for 31 in the first Test at Edgbaston. He pulled off a remarkable anticipatory catch in the Lord's Test when he stepped forward from his short leg position to catch the ball off a defensive stroke with his hand on the batsman's boot. In the final Test at the Oval, he made the highest score of his whole Test career with 39* in twenty minutes, including three sixes off Alex Moir.

Despite sending what was, on paper, a very strong team on the 1958–59 tour of Australasia, England lost the Ashes to Richie Benaud's Australians, who won the series 4–0 with the third Test drawn. Tom Graveney recalled that "it was a miserable tour (and England) were never a team". Graveney agreed with Trueman that the biggest problem was the tour manager, Freddie Brown, who "did a very bad job". Graveney confirmed that Brown had been rude to several team members and "was a very stuck-up individual, at least when he was sober". Brown tried to make trouble for Trueman from the outset of the tour but Trueman had learned a lot from his West Indian experience five years earlier and made a formal complaint about Brown to the team captain, Peter May. Although May was a public school-educated amateur like Brown, he supported Trueman and reprimanded Brown, telling him to "act in a manner more befitting someone with managerial responsibility". For his part, Trueman described Brown as "a snob, bad-mannered, ignorant and a bigot".

Trueman was one of several players who suffered injury or illness on the tour and missed the first Test because of a back problem. He was fit in time for the second Test but was not selected. He took part in the last three Tests, taking nine wickets with a best analysis of four for 90. At the Sydney Cricket Ground, he established an excellent rapport with the Australian spectators. The fourth Test at the Adelaide Oval was the only one in which Statham, Trueman and Tyson played together for England. On the New Zealand leg of the tour, he played in all five first-class matches, including two Tests, and took 20 wickets.

For the first time in Trueman's career, Yorkshire won the County Championship outright in 1959. He made a major contribution to that success as he took 140 wickets. Arlott wrote of Trueman's deep commitment to the Yorkshire cause in 1959, the title win being the achievement of a career ambition. Trueman owed personal loyalty to Burnet and had developed affinity with his younger colleagues. The club's main players in 1959 were Binks, Bolus, Burnet, Close, Illingworth, Padgett, seamer Bob Platt, Sharpe, Stott, Taylor, Trueman and the Wilsons.

England played India in the 1959 Test series and Trueman, whose selection problems were by now behind him, played in all five Tests. He bowled the most overs and took the most wickets, 24 at 16.70. The series was a poor contest, England winning all five Tests as India had a very weak team at the time. The outcome of the series was evident in the first Test, which England won by an innings and 59 runs. Wisden records how England captain Peter May used his three pace bowlers Trueman, Statham and Alan Moss "in short relays to keep them fresh". The tactics gave India "no respite" and Trueman, the main destroyer, "always looked likely to tear through the whole team".

When MCC toured the West Indies in 1959–60, England had a largely rebuilt team and were not expected to do well but several batsmen scored Test centuries and England won the series 1–0 with four matches drawn. In direct contrast to his previous visit to the Caribbean, this tour was Trueman's happiest and most successful, largely because he had an excellent relationship with the manager Walter Robins and did not have to put up with the likes of Allen and Brown.

In 1960, Vic Wilson having succeeded the retired Burnet as captain, Yorkshire won the Championship again but Kilburn wrote that they did so "without laying any pretensions to being an outstanding team". Trueman's bowling by then contributed the team's main strength. He played in all five Tests that summer against South Africa yet still captured 150 wickets for Yorkshire, sometimes serving as a fast-medium bowler off a shortened run. His outstanding performance was taking seven in both innings against Surrey at the Oval. Trueman's value to the team was illustrated by them, in Kilburn's words, "having to wait for wickets when he was not in action". He made 32 first-class appearances and took 175 wickets, the highest season tally of his entire career, at the outstanding average of 13.98. Yorkshire's team in 1960 was mostly drawn from Binks, Jack Birkenshaw, Bolus, Close, Cowan, Illingworth, Padgett, Mel Ryan, Sharpe, Stott, Taylor, Trueman and the Wilsons.

The 1960 Test series against South Africa was the first time Trueman and Statham bowled together throughout and Arlott wrote that they "virtually won that Test rubber". England won the first three Tests and, in these, Trueman and Statham shared 39 wickets. Their final tallies were Statham 27 and Trueman 25. In its summary of the series, Wisden said that the South African batsmen did not come up to expectations because they could not handle Statham and Trueman.

Trueman played in the first four Tests against Australia in 1961 and, although he effectively won the third Test for England, they failed to regain the Ashes. Wisden said that the third Test, played at Headingley, should be remembered as "Trueman's Match" because "two devastating spells by him caused Australia to collapse". He took eleven wickets in the match for 88 runs, his best performance in Test cricket to date, and England won by eight wickets with two days to spare. Yorkshire finished second in the County Championship behind Hampshire, who won the title for the first time. Playfair said the Yorkshire team were looking distinctly jaded in the closing matches. Trueman and Illingworth were the outstanding bowlers for Yorkshire, both taking over 120 wickets in county matches.

In 1962, Yorkshire regained the County Championship title, but had to defeat Glamorgan on the final day of the season to secure the necessary points. Vic Wilson retired at the end of the season. The main players were Binks, Bolus, Close, Illingworth, Padgett, Ryan, Sharpe, Stott, Taylor, Trueman, Don Wilson and Vic Wilson. In another outstanding season of pace and swing, Trueman took 153 first-class wickets in 33 first-class appearances. He also scored 840 runs, which was the best season tally of his whole career but, because of inconsistency, he remained well short of the standard required if he was to be termed an all-rounder, though that is not something he ever pursued given his workload as a specialist bowler. In a five-Test series that year, England made short work of a Pakistan team that was weak in attack. As in 1961, Trueman played in the first four Tests but not the fifth Test at the Oval. He took 22 wickets in the series, his best match being the second Test at Lord's in which he took nine, the highlight being six for 31 in the first innings to bowl Pakistan out for only 100.

Trueman and Statham had taken 216 and 229 Test wickets respectively after the 1962 season so, when they toured Australia and New Zealand in 1962–63, both were poised to overtake the world record of 236 set by Alec Bedser, who was England's assistant-manager on the tour. Australian captain Richie Benaud was also in contention with 219 but, as expected, it was Statham who broke the record and he extended it to 242 wickets. Statham did not play in New Zealand and Trueman was then able to overtake him, extending the record to 250. The series was drawn, one win apiece, so Australia retained the Ashes. Trueman took three for 83 and five for 62 in England's victory at the Melbourne Cricket Ground when captain Ted Dexter used him in short bursts, setting defensive fields until he could return.

Although England were well beaten by Frank Worrell's outstanding West Indies team in 1963, Trueman had an outstanding series. After West Indies won the first Test at Old Trafford by ten wickets, many thought they would cruise to a series win but Trueman inspired an England fightback. The second Test at Lord's was a classic match in which all four results were possible until the last couple of balls but it ended in a draw. Trueman took eleven wickets in the match with six for 100 and five for 52. Richie Benaud, who had just joined BBC TV, said that Trueman "showed wonderful control of swing and length" in a "magnificent" performance. In the third Test at Edgbaston, Trueman went one better by routing West Indies for England to win by 217 runs. He took five for 75 and seven for 44. In the second innings, he took the last six West Indian wickets in only 24 balls at a cost of four runs. It was all to no avail, though, as West Indies won both the last two Tests to take the series by three Tests to one.

Yorkshire retained the County Championship title in 1963. Tony Nicholson reinforced Yorkshire's faster bowling and provided Trueman with an able accomplice. In addition, Yorkshire's batting was considerably enhanced by the emergence of Geoff Boycott and John Hampshire. Trueman took 76 wickets in the Championship, 34 in Tests and 129 in all matches. By this time firmly in the category of senior cricketers, Trueman was well aware of his position and its implied privileges but realised that both his energies and his resolve had to be nurtured. He captured five wickets in each innings when Yorkshire defeated West Indies at Acklam Park, eight for 45 against Gloucestershire at Bradford and, for England, had a match return of 12 for 119 at Edgbaston. He scored two centuries, the first of his career, one against Northamptonshire which Kilburn described as "timely in the context of the match" and the other at the Scarborough Festival where he hit six sixes and 11 fours in 67 minutes.

Trueman was selected for the first three Tests against Australia in 1964, was omitted from the fourth and then recalled for the fifth in which he became the first bowler to capture 300 Test wickets. England again failed to recover the Ashes in a generally disappointing 1964 series which is only memorable for Trueman's unprecedented feat. On 15 August 1964, he reached the milestone when he had Neil Hawke caught by Colin Cowdrey at slip in the fifth Test at the Oval. Hawke, a good friend of Trueman off the field, was the first to congratulate him. The occasion produced one of Trueman's few concessions to fatigue when he was asked if he thought his record would ever be broken and he quipped: "Aye, but whoever does it will be bloody tired". As Warr pointed out: "This comment reveals the essence of the man. A touch of belligerence, a hint of humility, a pinch of roughness and an over-riding sense of humour". Meanwhile, Yorkshire lost the County Championship title which was won for the first time by a very strong Worcestershire team which starred Tom Graveney and featured Basil D'Oliveira, Norman Gifford and fast bowlers Len Coldwell and Jack Flavell. Trueman's overall achievements in 1964 did not meet his own high standards and his tally of exactly 100 wickets was well down on his totals in recent seasons.

=== Final flourishes: 1965 to 1972 ===
A graph showing Trueman's Test career bowling statistics and how they varied over time.

Trueman's Test career ended in 1965 after he had played in the first two of a three-match series against New Zealand. In Kilburn's view, Trueman's "decline" was "not from skilful and purposeful and beautiful bowling but from devastating fast bowling" and it may have been accelerated by the change in 1964 to the no-ball law which, he contends, impacted the rhythm of fast bowlers with long run-ups culminating in a long delivery stride. Trueman continued to play first-class cricket for Yorkshire till the end of the 1968 season when his retirement was by his own decision. He bowed out of Test cricket with a then world record of 307 wickets at an average of 21.54.

Although he was the first bowler to take 300 Test wickets, he had undergone numerous clashes and problems with the England cricketing hierarchy and was not involved in the tours of Australia (1954–55); South Africa (1956–57) and (1964–65); India and Pakistan (1961–62); or India (1963–64). From the beginning to the end of his international career, England played 118 Tests and he missed 51 of them. He recalled in his memoirs: "Irrespective of the fact I was at the top of my game for Yorkshire and frequently topped the county bowling averages, I was often overlooked for England. To my mind the reason for this was personal. Quite simply, some of the selection committee did not like my forthright attitude, which they misinterpreted as being "bolshy". Rather than pick the best eleven players for the job, the selection committee would often choose someone because he was, in their eyes, a gentleman and a decent chap. Such attributes often took precedence over someone's ability to play international cricket". He also wrote: "For this reason I was selected for far fewer Tests than I believe I should have been. To my mind, if I'd had the opportunity to play in those Tests, I'm sure I would have topped 400 wickets. But that was not to be, even though I was regularly taking 100-plus wickets a season for Yorkshire".

Trueman made 33 first-class appearances in 1966 and was able to focus on his county career, helping the team to win the first of three consecutive County Championships to 1968. He says he "grew old gracefully (in cricketing terms)". He took 111 wickets, the twelfth and final time that he achieved 100 in a season. He made 31 first-class appearances in 1967 but greatly reduced his workload as a bowler, operating mainly in short spells. He had recognised that he could no longer maintain fast pace for the same time as he had done formerly, though he did comment on encountering "any number of sluggish wickets that summer".

In 1968, with Brian Close injured for a long period, Trueman was Yorkshire's acting captain in several matches and ensured that the team completed their hat-trick of titles. An event that gave Trueman considerable satisfaction was to lead Yorkshire to victory, by an innings and 69 runs, against a Test-strength Australian team at Bramall Lane. Trueman showed great tactical awareness throughout the match with a timely declaration of Yorkshire's innings and then ensuring that Australia faced slow bowlers only during periods of poor light. He himself took key wickets and Yorkshire, always in control, "surged confidently to their victory". He followed his policy of the previous season by bowling in short spells.

Following Yorkshire's victory over the Australians, Trueman decided to take stock of his career and decided that it was a good time to retire, so that he could "bow out while still at the top". As it happened, Brian Statham had announced that he would retire at the end of the season and Trueman decided to delay his own announcement after seeing the emotion of Statham's last match at Old Trafford. Trueman admitted that he would be unable to cope with a similar display of emotion by Yorkshire followers and postponed his announcement until well after the season had ended. He then quietly delivered a polite letter to the Yorkshire committee and so happily "avoided a big farewell"

Although he had officially retired, Trueman made one final first-class appearance in 1969 when he agreed to appear at the Scarborough Festival and play for the International Cavaliers against the touring Barbados team. He surprisingly reappeared in 1972 when he joined Derbyshire and played in six limited overs matches.

=== Summary of career statistics ===
For the details of this, see Playfair in 1969 and 1970. Trueman's autobiography has an extensive career stats appendix starting on page 381.

In 603 first-class matches, Trueman scored 9,231 runs, including three centuries, with a highest score of 104 and held 439 catches. He took 2,304 wickets, including four hat-tricks, at an average of 18.27 with a best analysis of eight for 28. In 67 Test appearances, he scored 981 runs with a highest score of 39* and held 64 catches. He took a then world record 307 Test wickets with a best analysis of eight for 31. His tally of 1,745 wickets for Yorkshire is bettered only by Wilfred Rhodes, George Hirst, Schofield Haigh and George Macaulay. He achieved 100 wickets in a season on 12 occasions, with a best return of 175 wickets in 1960. He holds the record for most consecutive first-class matches played (67) in which he took a wicket. Trueman played in only 18 limited overs matches and took 28 wickets.

== Style and technique ==
=== Approach to cricket ===
In his own words, Fred Trueman "didn't play cricket for social reasons like some of the fancy amateurs". It was his living and he "played to win". Conversely, he would try and do something each day to make the crowd laugh and "he breathed life and humour into any cricket match". He took his bowling very seriously indeed but he liked to entertain when he was batting or fielding. On the occasions when he captained his team, especially in 1968 when Brian Close was injured for a long time, he proved to be "a shrewd and intelligent exponent of the craft (of captaincy)".

According to David Frith, it was his "sense of fun and mischief" that prompted Trueman to make a habit of visiting the opposition dressing room and this was always "more than a social call". Sometimes he did genuinely want to see a "good mate" in the other team, such as Tony Lock or Brian Statham, but more often than not it was "a declaration of war, an acutely personal challenge, clothed in rollicking humour and self-caricature".

Trueman always maintained his hostility towards the perceived arrogance and "snobbishness" of some in the cricketing establishment, especially the likes of Allen (or "Sir", as he wished to be called). Trueman hated what he called "fancy caps" or "jazz 'ats", which specifically meant those of MCC and the universities, and was alleged to say on seeing the wearer of such a cap that he would "pin him to t'bloody sightscreen". On one occasion, a Cambridge University batsman, having just been dismissed, acknowledged him with the condescending compliment: "That was a very good ball, Mr Trueman". Trueman replied: "Aye, wasted on thee". In a similar vein, his view of the Gentlemen v Players fixture was that it was a "ludicrous business" that was "thankfully abolished" after the 1962 season.

=== Bowling ===
John Warr, with whom Trueman shared his first-class debut, wrote that from the beginning of his career, Trueman's run-up was "curving and long but nicely modulated". David Frith continued with Trueman reaching the wicket, where he turned his body side-on and cocked back his ball-carrying right arm, as the leading left arm was hoisted, before "an awesome cartwheel" sent him into a follow through which "resembled a Sea Fury finishing its mission along the runway of an aircraft carrier". Warr said Trueman's final stride had a "pronounced drag" which caused him some difficulties when the front-foot rule was introduced. His bowling arm was kept high through the delivery stride, to generate extra bounce and pace off the pitch, and the movement of the ball was "predominantly away from the bat" (i.e., the out-swinger). Trueman himself maintained that his ability to bowl outswingers consistently was "another new ingredient I brought to the county game". As Maurice Leyland said to him: "Keep bowling those outswingers, Fred, and you'll be all right. That's the one that gets the great batsmen out!" Trueman acknowledged that other great fast bowlers who could bowl the outswinger well were Ray Lindwall and Wes Hall; but Brian Statham and Frank Tyson could not.

In Jim Kilburn's view, "(Trueman's) place among the truly great bowlers of cricket history is beyond question". He had a "resilience of spirit (that was) as marked as the physical power that gave him such remarkable freedom from injury over the years". His name on the team-sheet was "an advertisement for any match". Trueman's method was a long, accelerating run-up ending in a wide delivery stride with a "cartwheel" swing of the arms and a balanced follow-through. Technically, he was "highly accomplished" as he had much more than mere speed at his command, for he learned in-swing, out-swing and variation of pace and length. Kilburn's final analysis of Trueman's contribution to Yorkshire cricket is: "In an XI representing all the county history he would be selected".

In his early days, Trueman had very fast pace but tended to be wayward and was liable to be punished accordingly. His natural hostility in that period earned him his famous nickname of "Fiery Fred". As time went by, much of the belligerence and raw pace faded, being replaced by a growing mastery of the bowling arts. Strength, determination and stamina were always among Trueman's greatest attributes and with maturity came a control of both seam and swing. In Warr's view, Trueman learned that it was unwise to always follow a boundary with a bouncer and instead he cultivated the yorker as "a potent weapon". Trueman was one of the most charismatic cricketers of the post-war period and this charisma has been summarised by Mick Pope and Paul Dyson in "the rolling up of the flapping shirt sleeve on the walk back to his mark; the tossing back of the wayward locks of black hair before the smooth accelerated run to the wicket culminating with a high cartwheel action and drag of the back foot through the crease", the conclusion being that "Trueman is one of English cricket's icons".

Trueman's career lasted twenty seasons, an extremely long span for a fast bowler, and Arlott noted of him that he maintained his form and ability "much longer than the peak period (i.e., a decade) of even the best of the kind (and) he was, when the fire burned, as fine a fast bowler as any". When explaining his success as a fast bowler, Trueman always maintained that he was "blessed by two things from birth": the "Trueman tenacity" and the "perfect physique for a fast bowler". He said that the essentials for that perfect physique were having strong, thick legs – "always the first essentials" – with big shoulders and hips.

Wisden described Fred Trueman as "probably the greatest fast bowler England has produced". Trueman would have considered this to be an understatement as he believed himself to be "t'finest fast bowler that ever drew breath" and there were many who agreed with him.

=== Batting and fielding ===
Although he always saw himself as a specialist bowler, Trueman was an outstanding fielder and a useful late order batsman. He preferred to field close in, his favourite position being leg slip, and he was a fine and safe catcher. Warr says Trueman was a "brilliant ambidextrous thrower" and he "made life very easy for his captain to place him advantageously in the field". Though he had some talent as a batsman, Trueman never aspired to becoming a genuine all-rounder. He lacked the necessary consistency as he batted primarily to entertain but he had a good defensive technique with a range of attacking strokes which he would employ boldly. His batting consistency did improve in later years and he scored three first-class centuries. On the Sunday rest day of the 5th Test against the West Indies in 1963, Trueman - amongst others - played in a charity match at Stoke Poges Cricket Club, where he was bowled by a 12-year-old schoolboy.

== Media work ==
=== Test Match Special ===
Trueman was an expert summariser for the BBC's Test Match Special radio cricket commentaries from 1974 to 1999, forming close friendships with commentators John Arlott and Brian Johnston. He was well known for his direct style of commentary and frequently used a catch phrase, "I don't know what's going off out there", to express his dismay that current England players lacked his knowledge of tactics. Trueman was noted for his dislike of many aspects of the modern game, especially one-day cricket and the frequency with which current fast bowlers sustained injury. He was criticised by some for being unduly negative about current players and for glorifying cricket "in my day". He once remarked, amusingly without any sense of irony: "We didn't have metaphors in my day. We didn't beat about the bush".

Trueman was nevertheless respected for his unsurpassed knowledge of the mechanics of fast bowling, and many feel he should have been used as a bowling coach for England's under-achieving teams of the 1980s and 1990s, a point once emphasised by his fellow-summariser Trevor Bailey on Test Match Special. A good example of Trueman's coaching ability had occurred in 1975 when he was approached by the Australian fast bowler Dennis Lillee for help. Lillee was having trouble with both his run-up and bowling action, problems that Trueman had already observed and mentioned on the radio. Trueman gave Lillee the technical advice that provided the solution and Lillee was soon able to recover his form, though this was at the expense of England. Trueman received criticism from many people in the England camp for helping an Australian player, especially after Lillee publicly acknowledged his debt to Trueman. Bailey, on the other hand, completely rejected this criticism and said that the "prima donnas" of English cricket should also have the sense to consult experts like Trueman.

=== Television, journalism and other media work ===
In the 1970s Trueman presented the Yorkshire Television ITV programme Indoor League, which was broadcast at 5.15 pm on a Thursday evening, after the children's programmes. This show had a notably Northern, working class focus, and featured pub games such as darts, bar billiards, shove ha'penny, skittles and arm-wrestling. Trueman anchored the programme with a pint of bitter and his pipe to hand, and signed off each week with his catchphrase, "Ah'll sithee" (Yorkshire dialect for "I'll be seeing you").

He made guest appearances in many British television programmes of the 1970s. He played himself in an episode of Two in Clover (series 2, episode 6), where he appeared alongside Sid James and Victor Spinetti. Another notable appearance was as Earnest Egan in the Dad's Army episode "The Test" (series 4, episode 10), which centred on a cricket match. Trueman's character bowled one ball and then retired with a shoulder injury.

He was the subject of This Is Your Life on 5 December 1979. He wrote a column in the Sunday People newspaper for 43 years to provide coverage of cricket and rugby league. Soon after his retirement from cricket, he tried his hand at being a stand-up comedian but found after-dinner speaking to be a more congenial and lucrative occupation.

Along with fellow cricketing broadcaster Henry Blofeld, Trueman played a fictionalised version of himself in the Tertiary Phase of The Hitchhiker's Guide to the Galaxy radio programme.

== Personal and family life ==
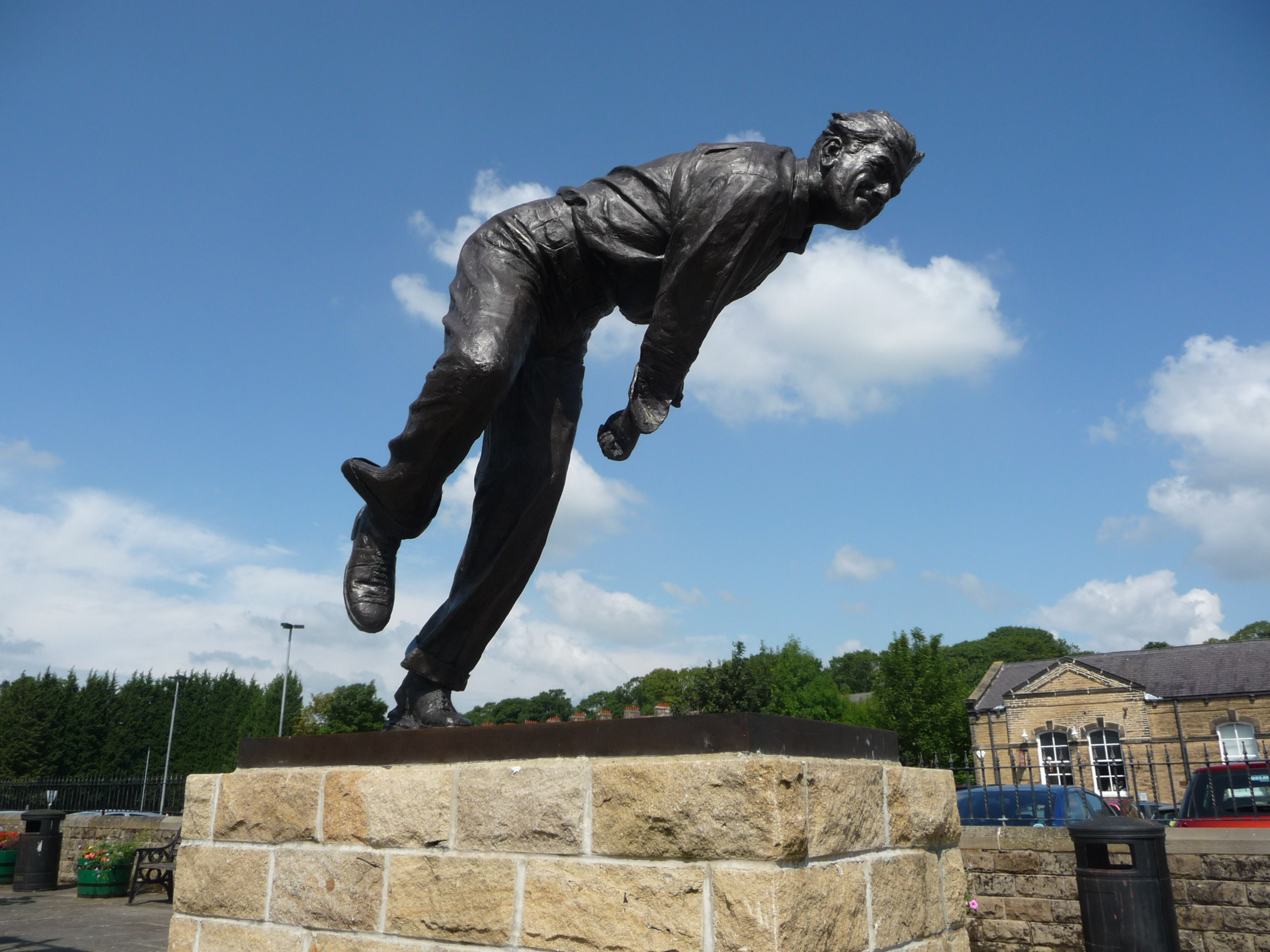
Statue in Skipton

Fred Trueman married Enid Chapman on 19 March 1955 at All Saints' Church, Scarborough, and had three children: Karen, Rebecca and Rodney. After divorce in 1972, Trueman remarried on 28 February 1973 at the register office in Skipton. His second wife was Veronica Wilson who had two children: Sheenagh and Patrick. They lived in the Craven village of Flasby in the Yorkshire Dales. Trueman was the titular proprietor of a company called Freddie Trueman Sports Ltd which operated a sporting goods shop in Skipton until it was dissolved.

In June 1991, his daughter Rebecca married Damon Welch, the son of film actress Raquel Welch, but the marriage ended in divorce two years later.

== Politics ==
Trueman was a monarchist and long-time supporter of the Conservative Party.

== Honours ==
Trueman was appointed an Officer of the Order of the British Empire (OBE) in the 1989 Birthday Honours for services to cricket. After his Test Match Special colleague Brian Johnston had nicknamed him "Sir Frederick", there were those who thought he had really been knighted and many, particularly in his native county, who could not understand why he had not.

Having been a pipe-smoker all of his adult life, Trueman was elected Pipe Smoker of the Year in 1974 by the British Pipesmokers' Council. This award was discontinued in 2004, two years before Trueman was diagnosed with lung cancer, because its organisers feared it fell foul of new laws on tobacco promotion.

== Death ==
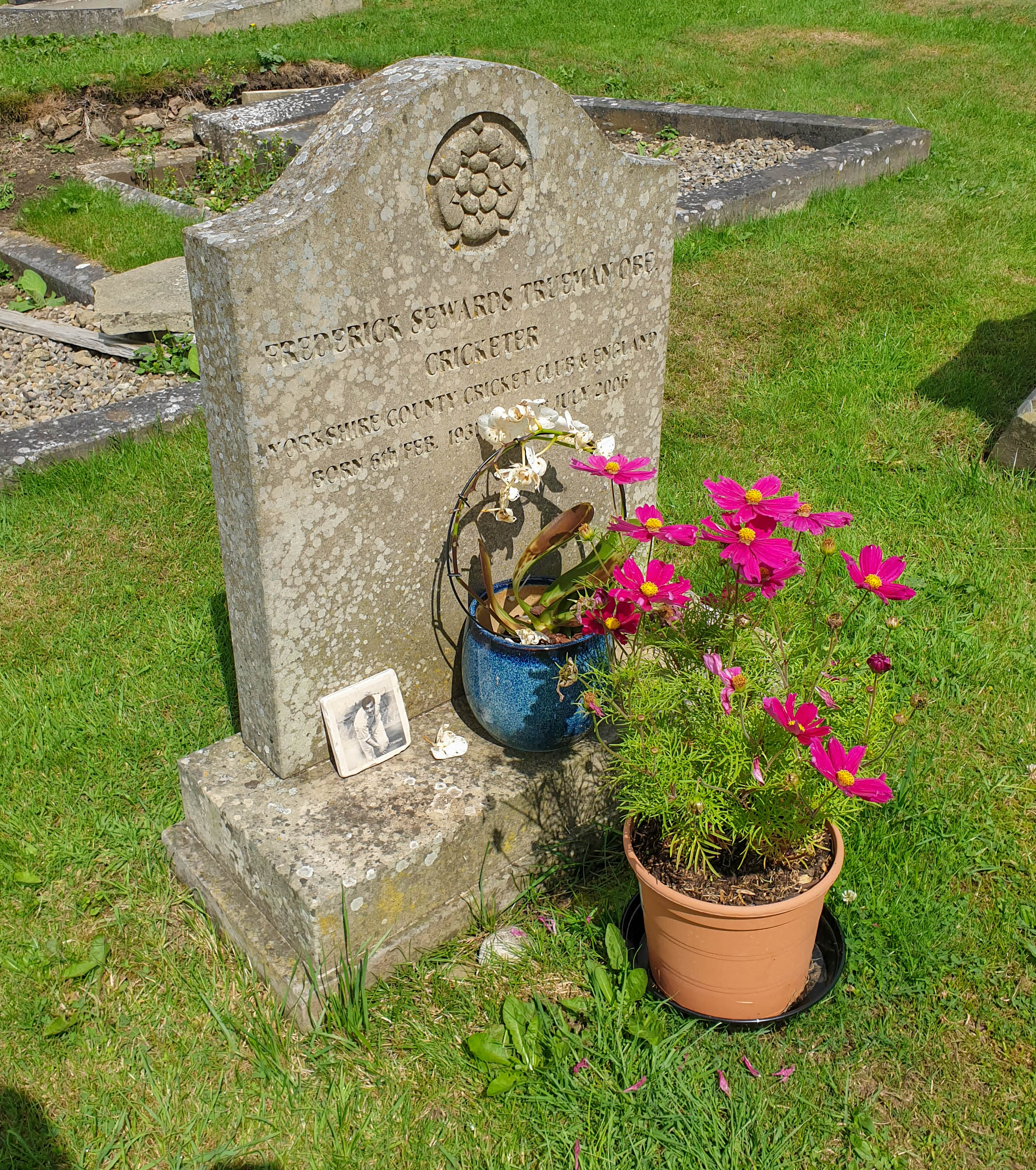
Trueman's grave at Bolton Abbey

Trueman was diagnosed with small cell carcinoma of the lung in May 2006. He died of the disease on 1 July 2006 at Airedale General Hospital in Steeton with Eastburn, West Yorkshire. His funeral service was held at the Bolton Priory on 6 July, and was attended by former and current Yorkshire players, including Ray Illingworth and Brian Close. His body was then interred in the Priory's cemetery. A book of condolence was also opened at Headingley cricket ground and later presented to his widow.

== Statue ==
On 18 March 2010, a bronze statue of Trueman (illustrated above) by Yorkshire-born sculptor Graham Ibbeson was unveiled by Veronica Trueman at the Leeds and Liverpool Canal basin in Skipton. Also in attendance were Trueman's brother Dennis and the former Test umpire Dickie Bird.

== See also ==
- List of international cricket five-wicket hauls by Fred Trueman

== Bibliography ==
=== Specific ===
- Arlott, John (1971). Fred – Portrait of a Fast Bowler. Eyre & Spottiswoode. ISBN 0-340-18105-2.
- Baxter, Peter (2007). Test Match Special – 50 Not Out. Woodlands Books Ltd.
- Benaud, Richie (2005). My Spin on Cricket. Hodder and Stoughton. ISBN 9780340833933.
- Birley, Derek (1999). A Social History of English Cricket. Aurum.
- Frith, David (1975). The Fast Men. TransWorld Publishing.
- James, C. L. R. (1963). Beyond a Boundary. Hutchinson.
- Johnston, Brian (1992). Someone Who Was: Reflections on a Life of Happiness and Fun. Methuen.
- Kilburn, J. M. (1970). A History of Yorkshire Cricket. Stanley Paul. ISBN 0-09-101110-8.
- Pope, Mick; Dyson, Paul (2001). 100 Greats – Yorkshire County Cricket Club. Tempus.
- Swanton, E. W., ed. (1986). Barclays World of Cricket, 3rd edition. Willow Books. Article on Fred Trueman written by John Warr.
- Trueman, Fred (2004). As It Was. Macmillan. ISBN 0-330-42705-9.
- Trueman, Fred (1976). Ball of Fire. Dent.
- Waters, Chris (2011). Fred Trueman: The Authorised Biography. London: Aurum. ISBN 978-1-84513-453-2.
- Webber, Roy (1958). The County Cricket Championship. Sportsman's Book Club.
- Williams, Charles (2012). Gentlemen & Players – The Death of Amateurism in Cricket. Weidenfeld & Nicolson. ISBN 978-0-7538-2927-1.

=== General ===
- Playfair Cricket Annual (1950 to 1969). Playfair Books Ltd.
- Wisden Cricketers' Almanack (1950 to 1969). John Wisden & Co. Ltd.

Records
Preceded by Brian Statham	World record – most career wickets in Test cricket 307 wickets (21.57) in 67 Tests; Held record 15 March 1963 to 1 February 1976	Succeeded by Lance Gibbs
