= 1946 County Championship =

English cricket tournament

- Cricket format: First-class cricket
- Tournament format: League system
- Champions: Yorkshire (22nd title)
- Participants: 17
- Matches: 221
- Most runs: Laurie Fishlock, (Surrey); 1,963
- Most wickets: Eric Hollies, (Warwickshire); 175

The 1946 County Championship was the 47th officially organised running of the County Championship. Yorkshire County Cricket Club won their 22nd championship title.

The Championship was the first for six years due to World War II and was decided on total points scored instead of the previous system of averages. All teams played 26 games.

== Review ==
The 1946 County Championship had all teams scheduled to play 26 matches, although there were many incomplete games because of the weather "may be written down as the worst in living memory". Teams were awarded 12 points for a win and could also claim points for first innings lead in matches drawn or lost. In the end, the team with the most wins finished first and the team with the second most wins finished second, so the additional points did not really impact the outcome. According to Wisden in its 1947 edition, Yorkshire retained the title with "something to spare" but the competition was very close until the last few days. Middlesex and Lancashire "gave Yorkshire most reason for anxiety".

Captained by Brian Sellers, Yorkshire's success was chiefly due to its two main bowlers Ellis Robinson and Arthur Booth who took 167 and 111 wickets respectively in all first-class matches. Yorkshire's pace bowlers were the veteran Bill Bowes, who played for England in 1946, and future England player Alec Coxon. They took 65 and 69 wickets respectively. Seamer Frank Smailes, who also played for England against India, took 76 wickets. Booth was the season's surprise success as he was then 43 and had been a Minor Counties player before the war. Yorkshire had recalled him after many years absence as a replacement for the late Hedley Verity and Booth made the most of frequently damp conditions that suited his type of slow left arm bowling. Yorkshire's batting depended heavily on Len Hutton, supported by veterans Wilf Barber and Maurice Leyland. Norman Yardley batted well and took part in a Test trial.

Runners-up Middlesex was captained by Walter Robins and had a very strong batting lineup led by Denis Compton. The best Middlesex bowlers were Jim Sims and Jack Young.

== Final table ==
- 12 pts for a win
- 6 pts for a tie
- 4 pts for a first innings lead in a draw or defeat
- 2 pts for a first innings equalling that of an opponent in a draw or defeat
- 8 pts for a win in a match under one-day rules

	Team	Pld	W	L	D	No dec	1st Inns Lead	1st Inns Tie	Pts
1	Yorkshire	26	16	1	6 (Note: Yorkshire were awarded eight points for the draw against Warwickshire, which they won under one-day rules.)	3	4	0	216
2	Middlesex	26	16	5	5	0	3	0	204
3	Lancashire	26	15	4	5	2	5	0	200
4	Somerset	26	12	6	7	1	5	1	166
5	Gloucestershire	26	12	6	4	4	4	0	160
=6	Glamorgan	26	10	8	6	2	6	0	144
=6	Kent	26	11	8	7	0	3	0	144
=8	Essex	26	8	9	8	1	6	0	120
=8	Worcestershire	26	9	12	2	3	3	0	120
10	Hampshire	26	8	15	3	0	4	0	112
=11	Leicestershire	26	7	13	4	2	4	0	100
=11	Surrey	26	6	11	7	2	7	0	100
13	Nottinghamshire	26	6	8	11	1	6	0	96
14	Warwickshire	26	7	14	4	1	2	0	92
15	Derbyshire	26	5	12	8	1	7	0	88
16	Northamptonshire	26	2	11	11	2	10	0	64
17	Sussex	26	4	11	10	1	3	0	60

== Bibliography ==
- Wisden Cricketers' Almanack 1947
