= Francis McHugh =

English county cricketer

Personal information
- Full name: Francis Prest McHugh
- Born: 15 November 1925; Burmantofts, Leeds, Yorkshire, England
- Died: 21 February 2018 (aged 92)
- Batting: Right-handed
- Bowling: Right-arm fast-medium

Career statistics
Competition	First-class
Matches	95
Runs scored	179
Batting average	2.63
100s/50s	0/0
Top score	18
Balls bowled	15,877
Wickets	276
Bowling average	24.84
5 wickets in innings	15
10 wickets in match	4
Best bowling	7/32
Catches/stumpings	26/–
- Source: CricketArchive, 8 May 2022

Francis Prest McHugh (15 November 1925 – 21 February 2018) was an English first-class cricketer, who played three games for Yorkshire County Cricket Club in 1949, and 92 matches for Gloucestershire from 1952 to 1956.

A 6 ft 3 in (1.91 m) right arm fast medium bowler, he took 276 wickets at an average of 24.84, with a best of 7 for 32 for Gloucestershire against his native county. He took five wickets in an innings fifteen times, and ten wickets in a match on four occasions.

Initially McHugh was a distinctly fast bowler who came into the Yorkshire team with a major injury to Ron Aspinall who was heading the bowling averages early in 1949. He did modestly and with the presence of Coxon, Trueman and Appleyard, was discarded and did not play even in the Second Eleven in 1950. McHugh then went to Gloucestershire and upon qualifying he quickly found that his accuracy could only become of county standard when he moderated his pace. Consequently, McHugh became with George Lambert the best pace attack Gloucestershire – a county known for half a century for its near-exclusive reliance on spin bowling – had fielded to that point in the twentieth century. In 1954 he took ninety-two wickets for exactly twenty runs each, and in 1955 did almost as well with over seventy-five wickets, whilst in 1956 his average fell further to only nineteen runs a wicket.

McHugh's batting was consistently inept. His average of 2.63 is the lowest by anyone to play more than fifty first-class games. (Note: Cricket record lists do not keep records for lowest batting average, but Bailey, Phillip; Thorn, Phillip; and Wynne-Thomas, Peter; The Complete Who’s Who of Cricketers (ISBN 0600346927) shows nobody with nearly so low an average) 66 of his 111 innings were scoreless (he was dismissed for a duck 38 times), and he reached double figures on only four occasions. It was probably the liability of his batting that caused Gloucestershire to discard him in favour of David Smith for the 1957 season: McHugh had suffered from illness during 1956, and did not play after June, but had bowled so well in his last-ever game with eleven wickets for 112 runs that he was expected to continue in 1957.
