= John Surridge =

English cricketer

Personal information
- Full name: John Giles Clive Surridge
- Born: 10 August 1935 (age 91); Sutton, Surrey, England
- Batting: Right-handed
- Bowling: Right-arm medium

Domestic team information
- Years: Team
- 1956: Oxford University
- 1955–1958: Berkshire

Career statistics
| Competition | First-class |
|---|---|
| Matches | 1 |
| Runs scored | 1 |
| Batting average | 0.50 |
| 100s/50s | –/– |
| Top score | 1 |
| Balls bowled | 12 |
| Wickets | – |
| Bowling average | – |
| 5 wickets in innings | – |
| 10 wickets in match | – |
| Best bowling | – |
| Catches/stumpings | 1/– |
- Source: Cricinfo, 26 November 2011

John Giles Clive Surridge (born 10 August 1935) is a former English cricketer. Surridge was a right-handed batsman who bowled right-arm medium pace. He was born at Sutton, Surrey and was educated at Marlborough College in Wiltshire.

Surridge made his debut for Berkshire in the 1955 Minor Counties Championship against Cornwall. While studying at the University of Oxford the following year, Surridge made a single first-class appearance for Oxford University Cricket Club against Yorkshire at University Parks. During this match, he bowled two wicketless overs in Yorkshire's first-innings. With the bat, he scored a single run in Oxford University's first-innings, before being dismissed by Fred Trueman, while in their second-innings he was dismissed for a duck by Johnny Wardle. Yorkshire won the match by an innings and 189 runs. This was his only first-class appearance for the university. He also played field hockey for the university, for which he was given an Oxford Blue. He continued to play for Berkshire during this period, with him playing for the county until 1958, making a total of 21 Minor Counties Championship appearances.
