= Ron Aspinall =

English cricketer and umpire

Personal information
- Born: October 26, 1918
- Died: August 16, 1999 (aged 80)
- Batting: Right-handed
- Bowling: Right-arm fast-medium

Career statistics
Competition	First-class
Matches	36
Runs scored	763
Batting average	19.07
100s/50s	0/4
Top score	75*
Balls bowled	5,956
Wickets	131
Bowling average	20.38
5 wickets in innings	8
10 wickets in match	2
Best bowling	8/42
Catches/stumpings	18/–
- Source: CricketArchive, 8 November 2022

Ronald Aspinall (26 October 1918 – 16 August 1999) was an English cricketer, who played for Yorkshire, and a cricket umpire.

== Life and career ==
Aspinall was born in Almondbury, Huddersfield, West Yorkshire.

A useful lower order right-handed batsman and a fast-medium right arm bowler, Aspinall was 27 before he made his first-class cricket debut in 1946, and four years later his career was over, ended by an Achilles' tendon injury.

His most successful game came in 1947 against Northamptonshire, when he took 8 for 42 and 6 for 23 to dismiss the home team for 146 and 118 to hand Yorkshire victory by 351 runs. In 1948, he played fairly regularly as the successor to Bill Bowes, opening the Yorkshire bowling with Alec Coxon. Against Don Bradman's 'Invincibles' in the so-called 'Sixth Test' and he dismissed Bradman in Australia's second innings, caught by Len Hutton for 86, as well as Sid Barnes, Doug Ring, Ernie Toshack and Keith Miller.

In the season before his first-class career ended, 1949, he headed the national bowling averages in England, by taking 30 wickets in just four matches, at an average of less than 10 runs per wicket, before injury finished his season in May.

After leaving the first-class game, Aspinall played Minor Counties cricket for seven seasons for Durham from 1951 to 1957. Between 1960 and 1981 he was on the first-class umpires list.

Aspinall died in August 1999, in Almondbury, at the age of 80.
