= Bill Bowes =

English cricketer

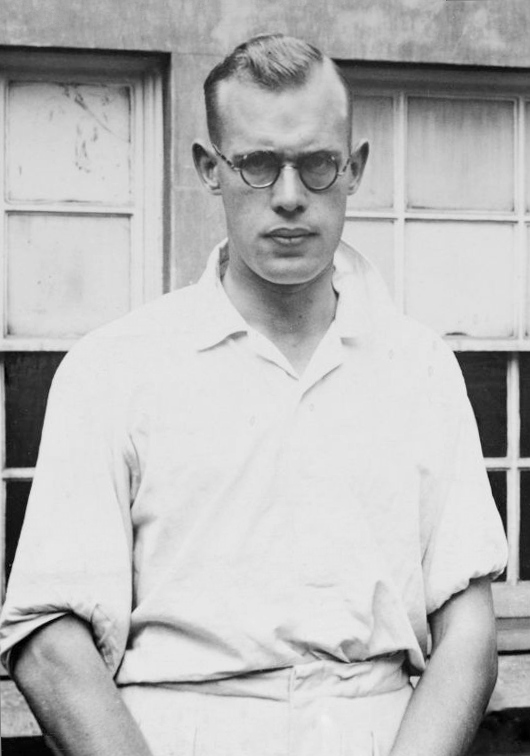
- Bowes in 1932

Personal information
- Full name: William Eric Bowes
- Born: 25 July 1908; Elland, Yorkshire, England
- Died: 4 September 1987 (aged 79); Otley, West Yorkshire, England
- Nickname: Lofty
- Height: 6 ft 4 in (1.93 m)
- Batting: Right-handed
- Bowling: Right arm fast-medium
- Role: Bowler

International information
- National side: England
- Test debut (cap 264): 25 June 1932 v India
- Last Test: 25 June 1946 v India

Domestic team information
- Years: Team
- 1929–1947: Yorkshire

Career statistics
Competition	Test	First-class
Matches	15	372
Runs scored	28	1,531
Batting average	4.66	8.60
100s/50s	0/0	0/0
Top score	10*	43*
Balls bowled	3,655	74,457
Wickets	68	1,639
Bowling average	22.33	16.76
5 wickets in innings	6	116
10 wickets in match	0	27
Best bowling	6/33	9/121
Catches/stumpings	2/–	138/–
- Source: ESPNcricinfo, 12 April 2009

William Eric Bowes (25 July 1908 – 4 September 1987) was an English professional cricketer active from 1929 to 1947 who played in 372 first-class matches as a right arm fast bowler and a right-handed tail end batsman. He took 1,639 wickets with a best performance of nine for 121 and completed ten wickets in a match 27 times. He scored 1,531 runs with a highest score of 43* and is one of very few major players whose career total of wickets taken exceeded his career total of runs scored. He did not rate himself as a fielder but he nevertheless held 138 catches.

Bowes played for Yorkshire and Marylebone Cricket Club (MCC). He was a member of the ground staff at MCC for ten seasons and they had priority of selection, which meant he played against Yorkshire for them and he did not play against MCC until 1938. He made fifteen appearances for England in Test cricket and took part in the 1932–33 Bodyline series. He took 68 Test wickets at the creditable average of 22.33 with a best performance of six for 33. Bowes represented Yorkshire in thirteen County Championship seasons, his career being interrupted by the Second World War, and the team won the championship eight times in that period, largely due to their strong attack which was led by Hedley Verity and himself.

During the war, Bowes was commissioned in the British Army as a gunnery officer and served in North Africa until he was captured, along with over 30,000 other Allied troops, after the fall of Tobruk in June 1942. He spent three years in Italian and German prisoner-of-war camps and lost over four stone in weight. He continued playing for two seasons after the war but, weakened by his experiences, could only bowl at medium pace. After he retired from playing, he became a coach with Yorkshire and worked for The Yorkshire Post as a cricket writer.

== Early life ==
Bill Bowes was born in Elland on 25 July 1908. His father, John Bowes, was a railwayman whose job with the Lancashire and Yorkshire Railway caused the family to relocate often. In 1914, they settled in Armley, Leeds, after he became a goods superintendent there. In his 1949 autobiography, Express Deliveries, Bowes says that he never had any boyhood aspiration to become a professional cricketer, rather he "just slipped into the game". He played street cricket with other boys and he began watching the local Armley club, whose ground was near his home. He particularly admired an Armley pace bowler called Tommy Drake and decided to copy his action so that, throughout his career as a top-class bowler, his delivery was always "as near Tommy Drake's as possible". Bowes went on to represent his two schools, Armley Park Council School and West Leeds High School, at cricket. At the latter, he gained his school cap after taking a hat trick.

After leaving school in 1924, Bowes worked in a Leeds estate agency but continued to play cricket at weekends for a Wesleyan Sunday school team in Armley and he was the club secretary for a time. He did this for the next two years until, just after Easter in 1927, he was invited by a casual acquaintance to join the Kirkstall Educational Cricket Club in northwest Leeds. In his debut match for Kirkstall's second team, he took six wickets for only five runs, including a hat trick, and the spectators organised a collection for him. Bowes now found a mentor in John Kaye, one of the club's committee members, who was to play in instrumental part in his eventual career with Yorkshire. Bowes had a successful season with Kirkstall in 1927 and began receiving offers from other league clubs to turn professional, some of the offers being more for one match than he earned in a week at the estate agency. However, Kaye and his colleagues were determined to keep him at Kirkstall until they could arrange for him to play professionally at county level.

With no apparent interest from Yorkshire at this stage, an approach was made to Warwickshire and they responded by offering Bowes a trial in April 1928. However, at the end of the 1927 season, MCC announced an intention to play against all first-class counties in 1928 and wanted to increase its professional ground staff, based at Lord's Cricket Ground. Bowes decided to apply and was invited to a trial in January 1928. At the trial, he bowled on "a net pitch of matting laid on concrete". Among the batsmen facing him were Pelham Warner and the MCC assistant secretary Ronnie Aird. Bowes made a distinct impression on them which resulted in his being offered an engagement on the Lord's ground staff for the 1928 season at £5 a week.

Soon afterwards, he was contacted by Yorkshire's secretary Frederick Toone following a request to Yorkshire by John Kaye. Toone recommended the engagement with MCC rather than Warwickshire, suggesting that Bowes would find greater scope for development at Lord's and, with Yorkshire's interests at heart, pointed out that he would be available to play for Yorkshire when not required by MCC. Bowes was impressed and turned down the Warwickshire offer. He quit his job at the estate agency and joined MCC on 15 April 1928, having negotiated a raise in his wage to £6 a week.

== Cricket career ==
=== 1928 to 1929 ===
Bowes gained valuable early experience with the Lord's ground staff and was especially grateful for coaching he received from Walter Brearley. He began his first-class career playing for MCC in 1928. Still aged nineteen, he made his first-class debut 30 May to 1 June playing against Wales at Lord's, taking three for 37 and two for 32. Neither Bowes himself nor J. M. Kilburn saw merit in that game which is currently rated first-class by CricketArchive. Kilburn wrote that Bowes' "first match of first-class rating" was MCC v Cambridge University played 4 to 6 July at Lord's. In this, Bowes took four for 20, including a hat trick, and two for 18. This achievement was noted in Yorkshire and, although Bowes did not play in any further first-class matches in 1928, the county club included him in their plans for 1929.

Following further appeals to Yorkshire by John Kaye, Bowes was invited in November to meet the club president, Lord Hawke, who concluded a formal agreement with MCC that Bowes should be made available to play for Yorkshire in 1929 when not required by any MCC teams.

Bowes made his first-class debut for Yorkshire against Oxford University at The Parks 8 to 10 May 1929. He took two for 28 and none for 40. In Yorkshire's next match, against Essex at the County Ground, Leyton, Bowes made his County Championship debut. He joined a full Yorkshire team that included the all-time greats Wilfred Rhodes and Herbert Sutcliffe. It also included Emmott Robinson, the great character of Yorkshire cricket who was much eulogised by Neville Cardus, and Robinson willingly became Bowes' mentor in his early Yorkshire career. Bowes took none for nineteen in the Essex first innings but did not bowl in the second as Rhodes, then aged 51, destroyed Essex with nine for 39 including one spell of seven wickets in 28 balls. Yorkshire won by an innings and 37 runs, Maurice Leyland having scored 134.

Yorkshire at this time was in a period of transition. They had won the championship four times between 1922 and 1925 but had since then been overshadowed by their great rivals Lancashire who had won the title in each of the preceding three seasons. In 1929, Yorkshire and Lancashire tied on points as runners-up, the title going to Nottinghamshire. Yorkshire's team relied on the experience and leadership of the veterans Rhodes and Robinson and on the expertise of established professionals like Sutcliffe, his opening partner Percy Holmes, Leyland and bowler George Macaulay. Otherwise, the team consisted of up and coming players who were effectively on trial and there was competition for places. Bowes, for example, had Frank Dennis as his main rival for the role of pace bowler. Other aspiring players active in 1929 were Wilf Barber, Horace Fisher, Arthur Wood and Cyril Turner while Arthur Mitchell had gained his county cap the previous year. Waiting in the wings, however, was Hedley Verity who was then playing in the Lancashire League and made his Yorkshire debut in 1930.

Bowes made only eight championship appearances for Yorkshire in 1929 but he took 40 wickets, five per match, and achieved the very low average of 17.77 which only Rhodes bettered among Yorkshire bowlers. Bowes' best bowling return in 1929 was an outstanding eight for 77 in late July against Leicestershire at the Dewsbury and Savile Ground. Yorkshire's view of his contribution is unclear and Kilburn wrote that they "were not, apparently, convinced". When MCC offered him a nine-year extension to his Lord's ground staff contract, Yorkshire did not dissuade him from signing even though it gave MCC continued first call on his services, per the existing agreement with Lord Hawke, and consequently he played for MCC against Yorkshire on several occasions.

=== 1930 to 1932 ===
Bowes really established himself in 1930 when, despite not being a regular choice early on, he took 100 wickets in a season for the first time. This became a habit and he reached the milestone in all but one season in the 1930s, the exception being 1937 when a major ankle injury curtailed his appearances. In 1930, he took 101 wickets at 19.54 with a best return of eight for 69.

Bowes in 1930 was a significant factor in what Kilburn called Yorkshire's "year of changeover". Rhodes retired at the end of the season with his replacement Verity already in situ. Arthur Wood, with whom Bowes was to work so well, established himself as the successor to Arthur Dolphin as Yorkshire's keeper. Yorkshire's batting was already strong, based on the triumvirate of Sutcliffe, Holmes and Leyland. It has always been said that bowlers win both matches and championships; in the partnership of Bowes and Verity, Yorkshire were onto a winning combination. For his part, Verity with his slow-medium left-arm bowling was virtually unplayable on sticky wickets, while Bowes enhanced his natural armoury of pace, lift and in-swing by learning how to bowl out-swing too. As Kilburn put it, 1930 was a season that "gave sight of the great team to come as the embers of a great team past were being raked out".

Learning to bowl the outswinger (later described by Trueman as "the ball that gets the great batsmen out") transformed the promising Bowes into the finished product and made him the most effective new-ball bowler of his time. Derek Hodgson in the official Yorkshire history wrote that Bowes had relied on his pace, bounce and a big in-swing, but he learned diligently, listening to his peers and especially to the then Yorkshire scorer Billy Ringrose, who had been a renowned out-swinger of his day.

Bowes himself recalled in his autobiography that "the penny finally dropped" when he read in a coaching booklet written by Herbert Sutcliffe, who was not a bowler, that placement of the feet in the delivery stride was key to bowling the outswinger. Bowes experimented and was successful. As Hodgson put it, "once he had included the away (sic) swinger in his armoury, Bowes moved from county to Test-class fast bowler". Kilburn wrote that with his ability "to bowl and control the outswinger, he became more than a fast bowler". His pace was already lively enough and his exceptional height (he was 6 foot 4 inches tall) "enabled him to pitch a length that could draw an unwilling forward stroke yet lift the ball sharply to shoulder of the bat or onto fingers". With two-way swing as well as lift and a judicious use of the bouncer, Bowes simply had "too many weapons for most batsmen playing at county level" and was a considerable handful for Test-class batsmen too.

In 1931, Yorkshire won the Championship for the first time since 1925 and Bowes took 136 first-class wickets at 15.66 with a best return of seven for 71 and completed ten wickets in a match four times.

In 1932, Yorkshire won their sixteenth Championship with a major contribution from Bowes who took 190 first-class wickets at 15.14 with a best return of nine for 121, also his career-best, and completed ten wickets in a match five times.

=== 1932–33 tour of Australia and New Zealand ===
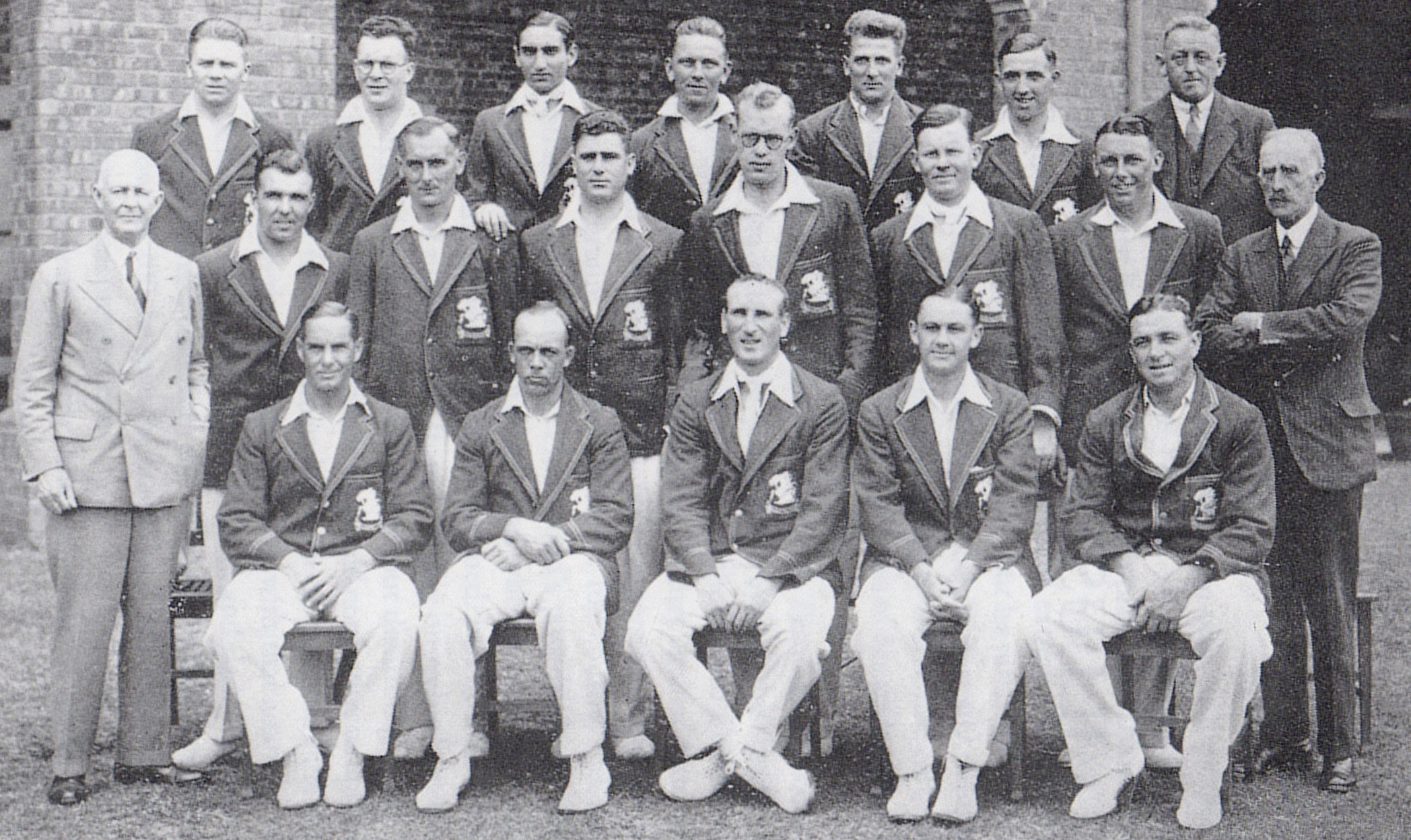
Photograph of the England cricket team which toured Australia in 1932–33, taken just before the third Test. Bowes (wearing spectacles) is fifth from left in the middle row. His close friend Hedley Verity is third left in the middle row and their Yorkshire colleagues Herbert Sutcliffe and Maurice Leyland are first left on the front row and middle of the back row respectively.

Bowes was a late selection, just three days before the ship sailed, for England's tour of Australia and New Zealand in 1932–33. He played in only the second Test on the Australian leg of the tour, at the Melbourne Cricket Ground, in which he bowled Don Bradman first ball and that was his only wicket in the match, which Australia won by 111 runs.

Bowes played in the second Test against New Zealand at Eden Park in Auckland and took six for 34 on the first day to bowl New Zealand out for only 158. England replied with 548 for seven declared, including 336* by Wally Hammond. It was a three-day match and the final day was ruined by rain, New Zealand scoring sixteen without loss as the game ended in a draw. Bowes played in twelve first-class matches on the tour and took 37 wickets with his best performance the six for 34 in the Auckland Test.

=== 1933 to 1935 ===
In the following two years, Bowes' frequent use of the bouncer was widely criticised but he continued to be the most potent bowler in the country on good pitches.

In 1933, Yorkshire won a third successive title, Bowes taking 159 first-class wickets at 17.78 with a best return of eight for 69 and completed ten wickets in a match five times.

In the 1934 Ashes series, Bowes was arguably England's best bowler with good performances in the Tests at Old Trafford and The Oval.

In 1934, Yorkshire lost the title to Lancashire. Bowes took 147 first-class wickets at 19.45 with a best return of seven for 34 and completed ten wickets in a match twice.

In 1935, Bowes was disappointing in the Tests but his bowling was a significant factor in another Yorkshire championship.

In 1935, with Yorkshire winning their eighteenth title, Bowes achieved a career-high season haul of 193 first-class wickets at 15.44 with a best return of eight for 17 and completed ten wickets in a match five times.

=== 1936 to 1937 ===
Yorkshire undertook a pre-season tour of Jamaica in February and March 1936, playing three first-class matches against Jamaica and some minor matches. Bowes played in all three games against Jamaica and took eleven wickets with a best return of four for 64.

In the 1936 season, Bowes was plagued by a series of minor injuries. Doubts about his fitness prevented him touring Australia though he headed the County Championship bowling averages.

In 1936, Yorkshire conceded the title to neighbours Derbyshire. Bowes took 123 first-class wickets at 13.40 with a best return of eight for 56 and completed ten wickets in a match twice.

Bowes sustained a serious ankle injury in the opening match of the 1937 season, starting on 1 May, and could not play again until 23 June. Despite the loss of their main pace bowler for nearly two months, Yorkshire won their nineteenth title. In 21 matches, Bowes took 82 first-class wickets at 19.58 with a best return of seven for 56 and completed ten wickets in a match once.

=== 1938 to 1939 ===
Fully fit in 1938, Bowes headed the first-class averages and his bowling helped England to a massive win at The Oval after Len Hutton had scored a world record 364.

In 1938, as Yorkshire won their twentieth title, Bowes took 121 first-class wickets at 15.23 with a best return of six for 32.

In 1939, poor weather conditions restricted his opportunities in the Tests against the West Indies, but Bowes proved unplayable on a wet pitch at Old Trafford and was second to Verity in the Test averages.

In 1939, Yorkshire completed a third successive title, Bowes taking 122 first-class wickets at 14.48 with a best return of seven for 50 and ten wickets in a match once.

=== Second World War ===
In the Second World War, Bowes was commissioned in the British Army as a gunnery officer and served in North Africa until he was captured, along with over 30,000 other Allied troops, after the fall of Tobruk in June 1942. He spent three years in Italian and German prisoner-of-war camps and lost over four stone in weight.

=== 1946 to 1947 ===
After the war, Bowes could only bowl medium-pace for short spells, due to his age and the effects of his incarceration.

In 1945, Bowes in his only first-class match took three for 22.

Bowes made his final Test appearance in the first match against India in 1946. Yorkshire retained the championship, their 22nd title, and Bowes took 65 first-class wickets at 15.18 with a best return of five for 17.

In 1947, Yorkshire slipped down the table as Middlesex and Gloucestershire fought for the title in a summer of glorious weather. Bowes took 73 first-class wickets at 17.49 with a best return of six for 23. He received a then-record benefit of £8,000 raised in the match against Middlesex at Headingley on 28 and 30 June. Bowes retired from playing at the end of the 1947 season. Cricket correspondent Colin Bateman summarised his career by writing: "Bowes' Test bowling average of 22 runs per wicket is outstanding for his era, his (first-class) career average of 16 is quite astonishing".

== Style and technique ==
In Barclays World of Cricket, Bowes is described as a bowler who "missed no opportunity to learn by tutorial and experiment". He rapidly developed into a new-ball bowler of "uncommon liveliness and control". His deliveries achieved significant and disconcerting "lift" thanks to his great height and high action. This, coupled with his ability to "swing" the ball and his "line and length" control made him a formidable opponent.

Colin Bateman wrote that Bowes "never looked like a cricketer" as "his fielding was clumsy at best and his batting so poor that he scored fewer runs than he took wickets". As a bowler, however, he had few equals during his best years in the 1930s. Very tall and willowy, Bowes was, after his early years, only medium-pace through the air but, thanks to his high action, could make the ball bounce very fast off the Yorkshire pitches of his time. He was able to sustain his attack for lengthy periods and, with the new ball, could generate an extremely deceptive "swerve" with the ability to swing the ball in both directions. At times, he was criticised for pitching too short, but in later years, with loss of pace, Bowes found greater reward in attacking the stumps.

== Retirement and personal life ==
When Bowes went to London in April 1928 to join the MCC staff, he lodged with the Beaumont family in Pinner who were friends of his parents. He lived there for many years while he was attached to MCC. It was through them that he met his wife, Esme, who was their niece. They were married at St Peter's Church, Harrow, on 30 September 1933 and had two children Tony (born 1935) and Vera (1939). Bowes was a devoted family man who loved walking his dog.

After he retired from playing, Bowes was a bowling coach at Yorkshire for many years and worked with, among others, the young Fred Trueman. Bowes had greater ability as a writer and became a cricket correspondent for Leeds-based newspaper The Yorkshire Post.

He wrote numerous articles for Wisden Cricketers' Almanack in which he showed how he experienced the game as a bowler, and his response to the problems (negative bowling) that cricket faced during the 1950s and 1960s. His responses focused on the everyday cricketer and showed a belief that club cricket, not county or Test cricket, should be seen as the core and building block of the game.

He joined the Freemasons in 1935, being initiated in to Lodge of Peace No. 3988.

Bill Bowes died following a heart attack on 4 September 1987, in Otley, West Yorkshire, at the age of 79.

== Bibliography ==
- Bill Bowes at CricketArchive
- Bill Bowes at ESPNcricinfo
- Bateman, Colin (1993). If The Cap Fits. Tony Williams Publications. pp. 30–31. ISBN 1-869833-21-X.
- Bowes, Bill (1949). Express Deliveries. London: Stanley Paul.
- Chandler, Martin (2012). "Bill Bowes – The Elland Express". cricketweb.net.
- Hodgson, Derek (1989). The Official History of Yorkshire County Cricket Club. The Crowood Press. ISBN 1-85223-274-9.
- Kilburn, J. M. (1970). A History of Yorkshire Cricket. Stanley Paul. ISBN 0-09-101110-8.
- Swanton, E. W., ed. (1986). Barclays World of Cricket. Willow Books. ISBN 0-00-218193-2.
- Trueman, Fred (2004). As It Was. Macmillan. ISBN 0-330-42705-9.
- "Bill Bowes – Cricketer of the Year". Wisden Cricketers' Almanack. 1932.
- Lonsdale, Jeremy (2024). An Unusual Celebrity: the Many Cricketing Lives Of Bill Bowes. Pitch Publishing. ISBN 978-1-80150-883-4.
