= Bob Appleyard =

English cricketer

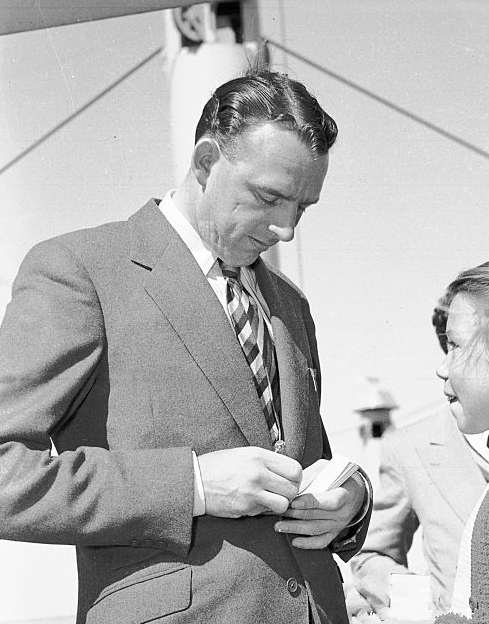
- Appleyard signing an autograph in 1954

Personal information
- Full name: Robert Appleyard
- Born: 27 June 1924; Bradford, West Riding of Yorkshire, England
- Died: 17 March 2015 (aged 90); Harrogate, North Yorkshire, England
- Batting: Right-handed
- Bowling: Off-break, Right-arm fast-medium

International information
- National side: England
- Test debut: 1 July 1954 v Pakistan
- Last Test: 7 June 1956 v Australia

Career statistics
Competition	Tests	First-class
Matches	9	152
Runs scored	51	776
Batting average	17.00	8.52
100s/50s	0/0	0/1
Top score	19 not out	63 not out
Balls bowled	1,596	29,980
Wickets	31	708
Bowling average	17.87	15.48
5 wickets in innings	1	57
10 wickets in match	0	17
Best bowling	5/51	8/76
Catches/stumpings	4/–	80/–
- Source: CricInfo, 4 April 2018

Robert Appleyard MBE (27 June 1924 – 17 March 2015) was a Yorkshire and England first-class cricketer. He was one of the best English bowlers of the 1950s, a decade which saw England develop its strongest bowling attack of the twentieth century. Able to bowl fast-medium swingers or seamers and off-spinners with almost exactly the same action, Appleyard's career was almost destroyed by injury and illness after his first full season in 1951. In his limited Test career, he took a wicket every fifty-one balls, and in first-class cricket his 708 wickets cost only 15.48 runs each.

== Career ==
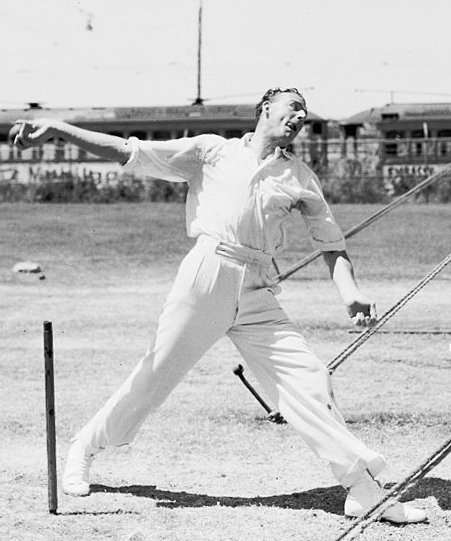
Appleyard in 1954

As a young cricketer Appleyard spent eleven months in hospital after being diagnosed with advanced tuberculosis. Whilst in hospital, Appleyard kept his fingers strong by squeezing a cricket ball under the bed covers. He had to learn to walk again and had the upper half of his left lung removed.

After success in local cricket within Yorkshire, Appleyard was engaged by the county in 1950 at the age of 26 and played three games for them, taking six wickets in two County Championship games against Surrey and Gloucestershire. With Alec Coxon departing for league cricket and Brian Close on military service, it was thought that Yorkshire would have an ordinary season in 1951, yet Appleyard's bowling, which saw him take the first 200-wicket aggregate for four years, ensured they remained near the top of the table. (In 2001, on the death of Alf Gover, Appleyard became the sole survivor among the twenty-eight bowlers who have taken 200 wickets or more in an English cricket season, the last case of which was Tony Lock in 1957.) His wickets in the 1951 season cost an average of 14 a piece. Appleyard was able to bowl both as a paceman and as a spinner with no apparent changes of action, so that he could go through an innings with little rest and possess sting under all conditions of weather and wicket. He was chosen as a Wisden Cricketer of the Year but did not gain representative honours.

After one match in 1952, however, a chronic illness kept Appleyard off the field for the rest of that year and all of 1953. Even at the beginning of 1954, he was not expected to play again, but a surprising recovery saw him second in the averages after Brian Statham and bowling with skill on a perfect pitch at Trent Bridge in his first Test. In the first innings, he took 5 wickets. In the words of Wisden: "His mixture of in-swingers, off-spinners and leg-cutters; his variations of flight and pace, bore the make of a highly-skilled craftsman". As a consequence, Appleyard was chosen for the Ashes tour ahead of Jim Laker, and under Hutton's captaincy. He again bowled with skill on unusually erratic Australian wickets, most notably in the extreme heat at Adelaide in the Fourth Test, which clinched the Ashes. Appleyard enjoyed the more English conditions as the tour moved on to New Zealand, and played a leading role the dismissal of New Zealand at Wellington in March for the lowest score in the history of Test cricket. On a rain-affected pitch, he took 4 for 7, as New Zealand were rolled for 26.

In 1955, by then almost exclusively bowling spinners, Appleyard was almost unplayable on the wet wickets early in the summer, but a knee injury wiped out almost all his cricket after the middle of June. He recovered his form well enough in 1956, however, to regain his Test place for the first match as Trent Bridge but did not bowl well enough to challenge Jim Laker for the rest of the summer. Then, in 1957, Appleyard declined so badly that Yorkshire often left him out of their team: he seemed unable to show his old versatility when asked to open the bowling again with Fred Trueman and was not gaining as much penetration on rain-affected surfaces. Appleyard's decline continued in 1958, and Yorkshire dropped him for good in early June, and he never did well enough for the second eleven for them to consider retaining him.

== Post-playing career ==
Appleyard became a successful businessman after retirement from the game and founded a cricket school in Bradford. He raised over a million pounds for youth cricket, working with the Sir Leonard Hutton Foundation Scheme for young cricketers. His proceeds from his biography were donated to this fund. According to his biography on Cricinfo, "Appleyard became a successful business rep and he was working for the British Printing Corporation in 1981 when it was taken over by Robert Maxwell. Appleyard quickly saw Maxwell for the crook that he was and when Maxwell dismissed him on the strength of trumped-up allegations, Appleyard battled for a fair settlement and won, shrewdly taking his money out of the BPC pension fund at the same time". Cricket commentator Colin Bateman also noted that Appleyard won an out-of-court settlement from Maxwell, whom Appleyard had threatened to sue.

== Personal life ==
As a youth, Appleyard walked into the bathroom of his home in Bradford to find the bodies of his father John, his stepmother, and his two little sisters Wendy and Brenda, in a room thick with gas. At the subsequent inquest, it was stated that John had been greatly disturbed following the recent outbreak of World War II. Appleyard said that "It is difficult even now to recall the details. I think I'd been spending some nights at my grandma's. She was on her own, and I spent quite a bit of time with her".

In 1997 he was awarded an honorary doctorate by the University of Bradford. He served as President of Yorkshire into his eighties, from 2006 to 2008, and was an Honorary Life Member of the club. Appleyard died aged 90 at his home in Harrogate, North Yorkshire, on 17 March 2015.
