= Frank Smailes =

Personal information
- Full name: Thomas Francis Smailes
- Born: 27 March 1910; Ripley, West Riding of Yorkshire, England
- Died: 1 December 1970 (aged 60); Harrogate, Yorkshire, England
- Batting: Left-handed
- Bowling: Right-arm medium

International information
- National side: England
- Only Test: 22 June 1946 v India

Career statistics
Competition	Test	First-class
Matches	1	269
Runs scored	25	5,892
Batting average	25.00	19.25
100s/50s	0/0	3/24
Top score	25	117
Balls bowled	120	41,008
Wickets	3	822
Bowling average	20.66	20.81
5 wickets in innings	0	41
10 wickets in match	0	6
Best bowling	3/44	10/47
Catches/stumpings	0/–	154/–
- Source: CricInfo, 10 September 2022

Thomas Francis Smailes (27 March 1910 – 1 December 1970) was an English cricketer, who played first-class cricket for Yorkshire County Cricket Club, and one Test match for England. He was one of Yorkshire's main players in the club's outstanding years, when they won eight County Championships out of ten.

Though Smailes was never a player of the class of Sutcliffe, Hutton, Bowes, Verity or Leyland, he was extremely valuable to Yorkshire because of his versatility. He could bowl either swingers as a new ball partner to Bowes, or later off-breaks when pitches were affected by rain. He was also a dangerous left-handed batsman who scored over a thousand runs in 1938, with centuries against Glamorgan and Surrey.

He lost his best potential cricketing years to the cessation of competitive cricket during World War II.

== Life and career ==
Born Thomas Francis Smailes in Ripley, then in the West Riding of Yorkshire and although he joined the Yorkshire staff in 1932, it was not until George Macaulay became unfit that Smailes had his chance of playing regularly for the first eleven. Smailes debut took place on 4 May 1932, against Oxford University. He took this chance very effectively, taking 105 wickets for around 21 runs apiece – a good average in such a fine summer, even though his bowling at this stage lacked the accuracy that was expected from Yorkshire cricketers, and he was perhaps overawed by having to lead the attack so often. His best performance was six for 56 against Kent, where he swung the ball prodigiously. At the end of the 1934 season, Smailes was awarded his county cap.

With Bowes and Verity dominating the following season, Smailes had fewer opportunities but his accuracy improved greatly. In the last match against Sussex he took ten wickets in a match for the first time, but just missed 100 victims. 1936, however, saw Smailes capture significant attention for the first time, with an impressive all-round performance against India of 77 (including three sixes) and ten wickets for 62 runs. He shared in a partnership of 167 with Verity for the ninth wicket, against Somerset, in one of the more remarkable county matches, and his fast-medium swervers could still be valuable as he showed with seven for 72 against Middlesex at Scarborough. Nonetheless, it was Smailes' development of off-spin – helped by the continuously soft wickets in the North – that caused his advance. In this style he took nine for 41 in a match against Worcestershire, six for 57 against Nottinghamshire and five for 39 versus Leicestershire.

1937, with Bowes absent for half the year, saw Smailes worked harder than ever before. Though he did not accomplish anything so good as in 1936 with the ball, he was always steady whatever style he was bowling, and as a batsman he hit his maiden century against Warwickshire early in the season. Smailes said, in later life, that he considered scoring that century as his greatest day in cricket. 1938 saw Smailes remarkably effective at Sheffield, but he did little as a bowler away from Yorkshire with Bowes, Verity and Ellis Robinson all beating him in the averages. Nonetheless, ten wickets for 137 in what would, but for rain, have been the first triumph of a county side over an Australian touring team since 1912, saw Smailes seriously considered for an England place. He was chosen for the Old Trafford Test in 1938, but the game was washed out without a ball being bowled.

1939, despite an amazing performance of 14 for 58 against Derbyshire, including ten wickets for 47 after he helped dismiss that county for 20 in the first innings, was wiped out by a major injury that allowed Smailes almost no cricket in the second half of the season. His ten wicket haul made him only the third Yorkshireman to take all ten wickets in a first-class innings, the others being Alonzo Drake and Hedley Verity (twice). At the start of hostilities, Smailes joined the 124th Battery Light Anti Aircraft Royal Artillery, as acting sergeant major. By 1942, he was promoted to captain, and served in North Africa fighting Rommel's Afrika Korps, and later in the invasions of Sicily and Italy. It was there that he learned of the death of his friend, Hedley Verity. He went to the cemetery in Caserta were Verity was buried and, along with another Yorkshire-born county cricketer, Phil King, erected a simple cross on Verity's grave. The conflict aggravated Smaile's varicose vein condition, and every day thereafter he had to have his legs bandaged.

Nevertheless, with the War having decimated England's ranks, Smailes, after just six first-class matches and an appearance in the Test Trial, finally received selection for a Test match against India at Lord's in 1946. Despite not faring badly in scoring 25 batting at number 8, and taking 3 for 44 in India's second innings, he was not retained. He was part, though, of another Yorkshire Championship winning campaign.

During the first few post-war years, despite occasionally captaining the side when Norman Yardley could not play, Smailes gradually dropped out of the team. He was awarded a benefit in 1948, which raised £5,104. As his playing days drew to a close, Smailes took over a pub and played three seasons of league cricket with Walsall Cricket Club.

Frank Smailes died in Harrogate, Yorkshire in December 1970, after a long and painful illness, at the age of 60.
