= Arthur Mitchell (cricketer) =

English cricketer

Personal information
- Born: 13 September 1902; Baildon, Yorkshire, England
- Died: 25 December 1976 (aged 74); Bradford, Yorkshire, England
- Batting: Right-handed

International information
- National side: England
- Test debut: 15 December 1933 v India
- Last Test: 27 June 1936 v India

Domestic team information
- Years: Team
- 1922–1945: Yorkshire

Career statistics
Competition	Test	First-class
Matches	6	426
Runs scored	298	19,523
Batting average	29.80	37.47
100s/50s	0/2	44/98
Top score	72	189
Balls bowled	6	523
Wickets	0	7
Bowling average	–	46.71
5 wickets in innings	–	0
10 wickets in match	–	0
Best bowling	–	3/49
Catches/stumpings	9/–	439/–
- Source: Cricinfo, 26 January 2023

Arthur "Ticker" Mitchell (13 September 1902 – 25 December 1976) was an English first-class cricketer, who played both for Yorkshire County Cricket Club and England.

Born at Baildon in Yorkshire, and nicknamed "Ticker" because of a habit of talking to himself while batting, Mitchell was a solid, determined and sometimes dour middle order batsman who converted to become an opening batsman after the retirement of Percy Holmes in 1932. An accumulator of runs rather than a stroke maker, he very occasionally allowed himself to bat more freely, and when he did he revealed himself as a particularly fine cutter. He scored centuries in four consecutive innings for Yorkshire in 1933.

He was a particularly fine close-in fieldsman, noted for taking catches off the bowling of Hedley Verity. The Yorkshire cricket journalist John Bapty said of Mitchell's fielding: "His skill became such, and his fame mounted so that there were times when it was said he had missed a catch that never would have been accounted a chance had he not made it one."

Mitchell's Test cricket career might have consisted of just three matches on the 1933–34 tour of India, when he performed without distinction in what was, in effect, an England second eleven. But an injury to Maurice Leyland just before the Headingley Test against South Africa in 1935 led to Mitchell being summoned, literally, from his back garden. With scores of 58 and 72, he retained his place for the final Test, and played once more, against India in 1936.

His first-class career lasted from 1922 to 1945. Mitchell was appointed county coach to Yorkshire after World War II, and remained in the job until 1970.

He died in December 1976 in Bradford, Yorkshire, at the age of 74.
