= Jim Kilburn =

British journalist

- Born: James Maurice Kilburn; 8 July 1909; Sheffield, West Riding of Yorkshire, England
- Died: 28 August 1993 (aged 84)
- Occupation: Journalist
- Known for: Sports journalism

James Maurice Kilburn (8 July 1909 – 28 August 1993) was a British sports journalist who wrote for the Yorkshire Post between 1934 and 1976. Well-regarded for the style of his writing and his refusal to write about off-field events, Kilburn wrote primarily about Yorkshire County Cricket Club. After a brief career in teaching, and having spent time in Finland, Kilburn was appointed cricket correspondent at the Yorkshire Post after impressing the editor with his writing. A serious man, he had an unusual way of writing his reports, but his editors refused to change his copy, so highly did they value his impact.

== Early life and career ==
Kilburn was born in Sheffield in 1909, and attended Holgate Grammar School in Barnsley before completing a degree in economics at the University of Sheffield. From an early age, he showed interest in cricket; as a boy he received coaching from former Yorkshire cricketer George Hirst at Scarborough, and played for Barnsley in Yorkshire Council matches and for Bradford in the Bradford League. Bowling fast-paced off spin, Kilburn was successful enough with bat and ball to win medals for Bradford and have his achievements reported in the press. He worked briefly as a teacher in a Harrogate preparatory school. While in Bradford, he met the vice-consul for Finland; as a result, he went to live in Finland for a year.

== Cricket correspondent ==
During his time in Finland, Kilburn sent travel articles to the Barnsley Chronicle and the Yorkshire Post. The editor of the latter, Arthur Mann, was impressed by Kilburn's work, and arranged to meet him in 1934. Learning of his interest in cricket, and recognising his name from his success in the Bradford League, Mann gave Kilburn a trial as the newspaper's cricket correspondent; the position had been vacant since Alfred Pullin had retired in 1931. An initial three-month period, with a salary of £3 per week, resulted in a written commendation from Neville Cardus, and he was appointed permanently with responsibility for cricket and rugby.

Now paid £6 per week plus expenses, and initially writing under the by-line "Our Cricket Correspondent", Kilburn quickly established his reputation. Soon after he took the position, he was given the byline "J. M. Kilburn"; his reports were often among the few not anonymised. He continued in the position until 1976, when he retired.

== Style and personality ==
As cricket correspondent for the Yorkshire Post, Kilburn wrote primarily about Yorkshire County Cricket Club. His obituary in Wisden Cricketers' Almanack described his writing style: he wrote "with a fountain pen on press telegram forms at 60 or 80 words a shilling. At the close of play he immediately concluded his essay; he hardly ever crossed anything out. His cricketing judgments were assured and rigorous, his style exact but sometimes elegant: Leyland's bowling is a joke but it is an extremely practical joke." The Times stated that his reports were "always precise, frequently elegant, sometimes stern and invariably fair and accurate. He never wrote an unpolished piece or an unidentifiable one, although he was only occasionally analytical." The speed and ease with which he produced his reports, and his refusal to use a typewriter—which he described as "the devil's own invention"—were envied by other journalists. Kilburn's writing was printed exactly as he wrote it; sub-editors did not touch anything, even if he had made a mistake, as his employers valued his style so greatly. He refused to write about off-field events which caused consternation for his editors as Yorkshire cricket was turbulent behind the scenes at the time he wrote. Nor would he write about the wider aspects of cricket, confident that his reputation made it impossible to sack him. This attitude made him popular with the players, and he became particularly close to Len Hutton and Donald Bradman. His position at the Yorkshire Post gave him freedom to write about whatever he chose, and he refused several offers to move to national newspapers. But his obituary in The Times suggested that, had he worked for a London publication, he would have been as well-known and respected as Cardus, E. W. Swanton and R. C. Robertson-Glasgow.

The press-boxes of Kilburn's time, particularly in Yorkshire, were unfriendly and serious places. According to Wisden, "[Kilburn] was a tall, austere man who had little truck with press-box banter." According to writer Derek Hodgson, Kilburn was shy. However, his views and methods were regarded as old-fashioned in the later stages of his career. Kilburn was often compared to his contemporary from Lancashire, Neville Cardus, but his style was dissimilar. Cardus wrote in a romantic style whereas Kilburn preferred factual accuracy; according to Wisden, Kilburn was "harder, less flashy, more punctilious". Journalist Frank Keating writes: "Neville Cardus was acclaimed the Wordsworth of cricket writing, while across the Pennines they hailed Kilburn as the Coleridge. With good reason." Kilburn's writings on the Yorkshire players of the 1930s and 1940s made them well known to the public as personalities, and he wrote several pieces for the Yorkshire Post which became famous. Kilburn had a deep love of cricket, and worried it was losing its way in embracing one-day matches and sponsorship, although he did not believe that progress was necessarily bad. He believed that cricketers should be chivalrous, and greatly admired stylish play. He severely criticised anything on the field which he believed fell short of acceptable standards, including the occasion in 1967 when Yorkshire won the County Championship after engaging in time-wasting tactics to avoid losing a game. He retired in 1976, but continued to follow the sport very closely.

== Legacy and death ==
Kilburn twice accompanied the England team on overseas tours to Australia: in 1946–47 and 1954–55. During the former tour, he became a founder member of the Cricket Writers' Club. He served as its secretary, chairman and later became an Honorary Life Member. He also became the only journalist elected as a life member at Yorkshire, and opened the newly built press box at Headingley Cricket Ground in 1988. In his final years, he became blind—his sight began to fail shortly after his retirement— but according to Wisden, "Jim Kilburn remained an upright, dignified man until he died". Outside of his work, Kilburn played golf to a reasonable standard, and was married with three children. Derek Hodgson writes: "All his work will be valued as an accurate insight into social attitudes in the first half of this century. Jim Kilburn intended always to write about cricket but in fact he told us all so much more." He wrote ten books on cricket, and contributed regularly to The Cricketer magazine and to Wisden.

== Bibliography ==
He contributed to the following books (as the sole author except where otherwise noted):

- In Search of Cricket. London: Barker. 1937.
- In Search of Rugby Football. London: Barker. 1938.
- The Scarborough Cricket Festival. Bradford: Yorkdale Press. 1948.
- Yorkshire’s 22 Championships 1893–1946. London: Edward Arnold. 1949. With E. L. Roberts
- Yorkshire County Cricket. London: Convoy. 1950.
- History of Yorkshire County Cricket. Yorkshire: Yorkshire County Cricket Club. 1950. With J. H. Nash.
- Len Hutton: The Story of a Great Cricketer. Bradford: Pitkin Pictorials. 1951.
- Cricket. London: P. Garnett. 1952. With Norman Yardley.
- Cricket Decade: England v Australia 1946–1956. London: Heinemann. 1959.
- A Century of Yorkshire County Cricket. Doncaster: The Yorkshire Post. 1963.
- A History of Yorkshire Cricket. London: Paul. 1970.
- Thanks to Cricket. London: Paul. 1973.
- Overthrows: A Book of Cricket. London: Paul. 1975.

== Sources ==
- Hamilton, Duncan (2007). "Preface: "I am here to write about the cricket"". In Hamilton, Duncan (ed.). Sweet Summer: The Classic Cricket Writing of JM Kilburn. Ilkley, West Yorkshire: Great Northern Books. ISBN 978-1-905080-46-5.
