= Alec Coxon =

English cricketer

Personal information
- Full name: Alexander Coxon
- Born: 18 January 1916; Huddersfield, Yorkshire, England
- Died: 22 January 2006 (aged 90); Roker, Sunderland, Tyne and Wear, England
- Batting: Right-handed
- Bowling: Right-arm medium-fast

International information
- National side: England
- Only Test: 24 June 1948 v Australia

Career statistics
Competition	Test	First-class
Matches	1	146
Runs scored	19	2,817
Batting average	9.50	18.17
100s/50s	0/0	0/13
Top score	19	83
Balls bowled	378	26,504
Wickets	3	473
Bowling average	57.33	20.91
5 wickets in innings	0	24
10 wickets in match	0	2
Best bowling	2/90	8/31
Catches/stumpings	0/–	127/–
- Source: CricketArchive, 13 April 2023

Alexander Coxon (18 January 1916 – 22 January 2006) was an English cricketer who played for Yorkshire. He also played one Test match for the England cricket team in 1948.

== Life and career ==
Coxon was born in Huddersfield, Yorkshire. World War II delayed Coxon's first-class debut for Yorkshire to 1945, when he was 29. Coxon was an aggressive fast-medium bowler who played for England once – against Australia in 1948 at Lord's. Coxon was included in the team for the final Test at Oval against West Indies in 1950 to cover for the injured Trevor Bailey but Bailey eventually played. There were rumours of an argument with Denis Compton, and his prickly nature was later attested to by Brian Close. Coxon retired after the 1950 season, allegedly in umbrage at his non-selection for the forthcoming Ashes tour, and moved to play Minor counties cricket with Durham. He played 29 times for that county between 1951 and 1954, taking 127 wickets and scoring 1,047 runs with two centuries. His highest score was 102 not out against Yorkshire Second XI at Scarborough in 1952. Also in 1952, he achieved his best bowling figures for Durham; nine for 28 and six for 58 against Staffordshire.

He also played professionally with Sunderland, where he took 753 wickets at 8.73 runs apiece, and scored 3,764 runs at an average of 34.21.

In 1959, he moved to South Shields where he took 443 wickets for 10.28 and scored 2,663 runs at 23.63. He had shorter spells with both Wearmouth and Bolden, before finally retiring from the sport some distance past his 50th birthday, although still coaching at Whitburn Cricket Club in 1979.

He also played soccer for Bradford Park Avenue A.F.C. in wartime matches. He kept up a keen interest in club cricket until the end.

== Cultural Influences and References ==
Coxsone Dodd CD (26 January 1932 – 4 May 2004), a Jamaican record producer who was highly influential worldwide in the development and evolution of ska, reggae, dub, and sound system culture as an international phenomenon, was nicknamed "Coxsone" due to his talent as a cricketer, his friends comparing him to Alec Coxon.
