= English cricket team in Australia in 1936–37 =

International cricket tour

The England cricket team toured Australia in the 1936–37 season to play a five-match Test series against Australia for The Ashes. The tour was organised by the Marylebone Cricket Club and matches outside the Tests were played under the MCC name.

Australia won the series 3–2, having been 2–0 down, and therefore retained The Ashes. The 1936-37 Australia side are the only team to win a five-match series after losing the first two Tests, with Bradman being the only captain to win a five-match series after losing the first two Tests.

== Test series summary ==
=== First Test ===
4, 5, 7, 8, 9 December 1936
(Timeless Test)
Scorecard

England	v	Australia
358 (113.6 overs); M Leyland 126 (290); WJ O'Reilly 5/102 (40.6 overs)		234 (85.6 overs); JHW Fingleton 100 (310); WE Voce 6/41 (20.6 overs)
256 (116.6 overs); GOB Allen 68 (205); FA Ward 6/102 (46 overs)		58 (12.3 overs); AG Chipperfield 26* (18); GOB Allen 5/36 (6 overs)

England won by 322 runs
Brisbane Cricket Ground, Woolloongabba, Brisbane
Umpires: GE Borwick and JD Scott

- England won the toss and elected to bat.
- 6 December was taken as a rest day.
- CL Badcock, RH Robinson, MW Sievers and FA Ward (all AUS) made their Test debuts.

=== Second Test ===
18, 19, 21, 22 December 1936
(Timeless Test)
Scorecard

England	v	Australia
426/6d (141.2 overs); WR Hammond 231* (579); EL McCormick 2/79 (20 overs)		80 (23.7 overs); WJ O'Reilly 37* (44); WE Voce 4/10 (8 overs)
		324 (f/o) (96.7 overs); SJ McCabe 93 (186); WR Hammond 3/29 (15.7 overs)

England won by an innings and 22 runs
Sydney Cricket Ground, Sydney
Umpires: GE Borwick and JD Scott

- England won the toss and elected to bat.
- 20 December was taken as a rest day.

=== Third Test ===
1, 2, 4, 5, 6, 7 January 1937
(Timeless Test)
Scorecard

Australia	v	England
200/9d (65.3 overs); SJ McCabe 63 (146); WR Hammond 2/16 (5.3 overs)		76/9d (28.2 overs); WR Hammond 32 (88); MW Seivers 3/28 (12 overs)
564 (149.7 overs); DG Bradman 270 (375); H Verity 3/79 (37.7 overs)		323 (78.6 overs); M Leyland 111* (212); LO Fleetwood-Smith 5/124 (25.6 overs)

Australia won by 365 runs
Melbourne Cricket Ground, Melbourne
Umpires: GE Borwick and JD Scott

- Australia won the toss and elected to bat.
- 3 January was taken as a rest day.
- Bradman's second innings was rated by Wisden as the best Test match innings of all time.

=== Fourth Test ===
29, 30 January, 1, 2, 3, 4 February 1937
(Timeless Test)
Scorecard

Australia	v	England
288 (77.6 overs); SJ McCabe 88 (145); K Farnes 3/71 (20.6 overs)		330 (113.4 overs); CJ Barnett 129 (332); LO Fleetwood-Smith 4/51 (30 overs)
433 (123.2 overs); DG Bradman 212 (395); WR Hammond 5/57 (15.2 overs)		243 (74 overs); RE Wyatt 50 (108); LO Fleetwood-Smith 6/110 (30 overs)

Australia won by 148 runs
Adelaide Oval, Adelaide
Umpires: GE Borwick and JD Scott

- Australia won the toss and elected to bat.
- 31 January was taken as a rest day.
- RG Gregory (AUS) made his Test debut.

=== Fifth Test ===
26, 27 February, 1, 2, 3 March 1937
(Timeless Test)
Scorecard

Australia	v	England
604 (140.5 overs); DG Bradman 169 (191); K Farnes 6/96 (28.5 overs)		239 (71.5 overs); J Hardstaff 83 (234); WJ O'Reilly 5/51 (23 overs)
		165 (f/o) (49.2 overs); WR Hammond 56 (106); LO Fleetwood-Smith 3/36 (13.2 overs)

Australia won by an innings and 200 runs
Melbourne Cricket Ground, Melbourne
Umpires: GE Borwick and JD Scott

- Australia won the toss and elected to bat.
- 28 February was taken as a rest day.

== Ceylon and New Zealand ==
The English team had a stopover in Colombo en route to Australia and played a one-day single-innings match there against the Ceylon national team, which at that time did not have Test status.

At the end of the tour the team visited New Zealand, playing three first-class matches, but no Tests.
