= Nuncargate =

Village in Nottinghamshire, England

Coordinates: 53.0820°N 1.2562°W

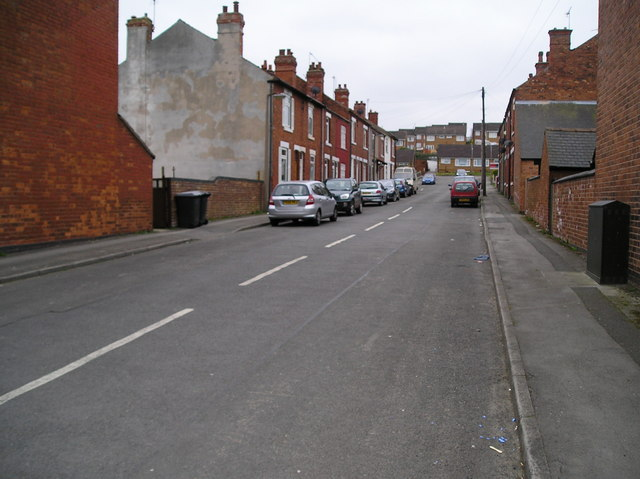
- James Street

- Location within Nottinghamshire
- OS grid reference: SK 504543
- District: Ashfield
- Shire county: Nottinghamshire
- Region: East Midlands
- Country: England
- Sovereign state: United Kingdom
- Post town: NOTTINGHAM
- Postcode district: NG17
- Police: Nottinghamshire
- Fire: Nottinghamshire
- Ambulance: East Midlands

Nuncargate is a village near Kirkby-in-Ashfield, within the Ashfield district, in the county of Nottinghamshire, England. It is 130 miles (210 km) north of London and 10 miles (16 km) north-west of Nottingham, the county town. It is notable for being the birthplace of the cricketer Harold Larwood.

== Geography ==
Nuncargate is in a combined built-up area with the Annesley, Annesley Woodhouse and Kirkby Woodhouse villages, and on the fringes of the wider Mansfield urban area. The A611 (Nottingham to Mansfield)/B6021 (to Kirkby) roads bound the east edge of the village, and meet at the Shoulder of Mutton Hill, which is on a ridge atop the Robin Hood Hills. From there it leads to Nuncargate Road, the main thoroughfare into the village which continues to Kirkby Woodhouse and beyond.

== Amenities ==
Being a small village, Nuncargate has some amenities. It does not have a railway station, but does have a post office, a primary school, and a small number of retail outlets. There is a public house, The Cricketers Arms. Both this and the Nuncargate Recreation Ground lay alongside Nuncargate Road.

== History ==
Nuncargate was not named in the Domesday survey, but was first listed in public records from the 13th century. The name may have been derived from Nun's or Nunna's marshland. The Cricketer's Arms dates from the 17th century. The route from Nuncargate to Shoulder of Mutton Hill was not in place until the early 1800s. It remained as a hamlet within the Kirkby ancient parish until the 19th-20th century, when it began to grow due to housing being built for miners based at nearby collieries. Nuncargate would eventually coalesce with Annesley, Annesley Woodhouse and Kirkby Woodhouse villages.

== Notable people ==
Notable people from Nuncargate include several cricket players and political personalities:

- Harold Larwood (1904–1995), cricketer
- Joe Hardstaff Jr (1911–1990), cricketer
