= Harold Larwood =

English cricketer (1904–1995)

Harold Larwood MBE
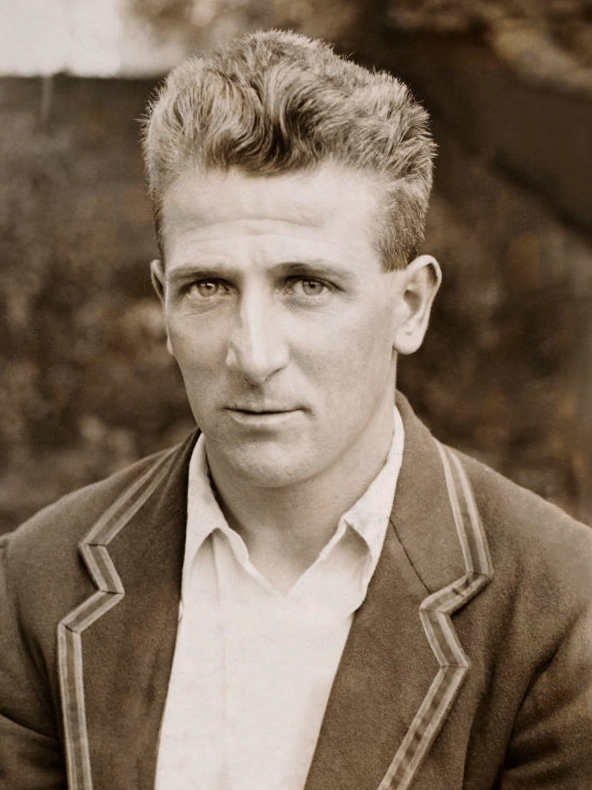
- Larwood on a 1932 cigarette card

Personal information
- Born: 14 November 1904; Kirkby-in-Ashfield, Nottinghamshire, England
- Died: 22 July 1995 (aged 90); Randwick, New South Wales, Australia
- Nickname: The Wrecker
- Height: 5 ft 8 in (1.73 m)
- Batting: Right-handed
- Bowling: Right arm fast

International information
- National side: England
- Test debut (cap 225): 26 June 1926 v Australia
- Last Test: 28 February 1933 v Australia

Domestic team information
- Years: Team
- 1924–1938: Nottinghamshire
- 1936/37: Europeans (India)

Career statistics
Competition	Test	First-class
Matches	21	361
Runs scored	485	7,290
Batting average	19.40	19.91
100s/50s	0/2	3/25
Top score	98	102*
Balls bowled	4,969	58,027
Wickets	78	1,427
Bowling average	28.35	17.51
5 wickets in innings	4	98
10 wickets in match	1	20
Best bowling	6/32	9/41
Catches/stumpings	15/–	234/–
- Source: ESPNcricinfo, 8 January 2009

Harold Larwood (14 November 1904 – 22 July 1995) was a cricketer for Nottinghamshire County Cricket Club and the England cricket team between 1924 and 1938. A right-arm fast bowler who combined extreme speeds with great accuracy, he was considered by many players and commentators to be the finest and the fastest fast bowler of his generation and one of the fastest bowlers of all time. He was the main exponent of the bowling style known as "bodyline", the use of which during the Marylebone Cricket Club (MCC) tour of Australia in 1932–33 caused a furore that brought about a premature and acrimonious end to his international career.

A coal miner's son who began working in the mines at the age of 14, Larwood was recommended to Nottinghamshire on the basis of his performances in club cricket, and rapidly acquired a place among the country's leading bowlers. He made his Test debut in 1926, in only his second season in first-class cricket, and was a member of the 1928–29 touring side that retained the Ashes in Australia. The advent of the Australian batsman Don Bradman ended a period of English cricket supremacy; Larwood and other bowlers were completely dominated by Bradman during Australia's victorious tour of 1930. Thereafter, under the guidance of England's combative captain Douglas Jardine, the fast leg theory or bodyline bowling attack was developed. With Larwood as its spearhead the tactic was used with considerable success in the 1932–33 Test series in Australia. The Australians' description of the method as "unsportsmanlike" soured cricketing and political relations between the two countries; during subsequent efforts to heal the breach, Larwood refused to apologise for his bowling, since he was carrying out his captain's instructions. He never played for England after the 1932–33 tour, but continued his county career with considerable success for several more seasons.

In 1949, after years out of the limelight, Larwood was elected to honorary membership of the MCC. The following year he and his family were encouraged by former opponent Jack Fingleton to emigrate and settle in Australia, where he was warmly welcomed, in contrast to the reception accorded him in his cricketing days. He worked for a soft drinks firm, and as an occasional reporter and commentator on Tests against visiting England sides. He paid several visits to England, and was honoured at his old county ground, Trent Bridge, where a stand was named after him. In 1993, at the age of 88, he was appointed a Member of the Order of the British Empire (MBE) in belated recognition of his services to cricket. He died two years later.

== Early life ==
Harold Larwood was born on 14 November 1904 in the Nottinghamshire village of Nuncargate, near the coal mining town of Kirkby-in-Ashfield. He was the fourth of five sons born to Robert Larwood, a miner, and his wife Mary, née Sharman. Robert was a man of rigid principles, a disciplinarian teetotaller who was treasurer of the local Methodist chapel. His chief pastime was playing cricket for the village team, which he captained. Harold Larwood's biographer Duncan Hamilton writes that for Robert, cricket represented, "along with his dedication to God ... the core of his life".

From the age of five, Harold attended Kirkby Woodhouse school. Over the years this small village school produced, besides Larwood, four other international cricketers who became his contemporaries in the Nottinghamshire county side: William "Dodger" Whysall, Sam Staples, Bill Voce and Joe Hardstaff junior. On leaving the school in 1917, when he was 13, Harold was employed at the local miners' cooperative store, before beginning work the following year at Annesley Colliery in charge of a team of pit ponies. He had shown an early talent for cricket, and began to play for Nuncargate's second team in 1918. Playing against experienced adults, in his first season he took 76 wickets at an average of 4.9. By 1920 he was in the first team, alongside his father, playing in plimsolls because the family could not afford to buy him proper cricket boots.

== Cricket career ==
=== County recruit ===
Despite his short stature (at 18 he was only 5 feet 4 inches tall), Larwood had acquired considerable stamina and upper body strength from his long shifts at the mine and could bowl at a disconcertingly fast speed. Among those who watched his rising prowess as a fast bowler was Joe Hardstaff senior, the Nottinghamshire and England cricketer who lived in Nuncargate. Hardstaff, who had worked with Robert Larwood at the mine, suggested to the youthful bowler that he should attend a trial at the county ground. In April 1923 father and son made the journey to Trent Bridge.

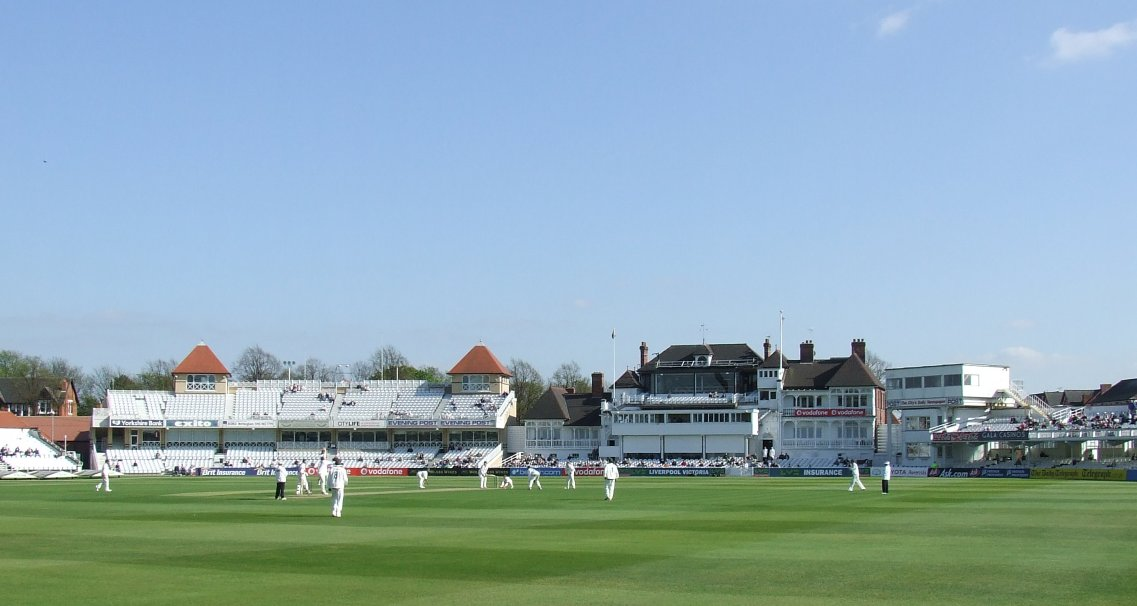
Trent Bridge cricket ground (2007 photograph). The main pavilion appears much as it did in Larwood's day.

In the practice nets, the county players towered over Larwood; the veteran Test batsman George Gunn thought he looked more like a jockey than a cricketer. At first he bowled badly, and his efforts were unimpressive. As his confidence increased his bowling improved, and committee members began to revise their initial dismissive judgement; when the session ended, Larwood was offered a playing contract. He accepted instantly; the terms were 32 shillings (£1.60) per week—the same as his mining wages—and he was expected, when not playing, to carry out ground staff duties. Robert Larwood was angry that his son had not asked for more generous terms, but according to Hamilton, Harold would have agreed to anything to escape from the mine, even for a single summer.

In the 1923 season, under the eye of the county's coach, James Iremonger, Larwood concentrated on building his physique and on learning bowling skills. He grew a few inches in height, although he remained short for a fast bowler, and under Iremonger's regime of diet and exercise he gained weight. Besides his physical development, he learned by incessant practice various bowling arts, among them accuracy in line and length, variation of pace and grip, and deviating the ball in the air to produce swing. That year he played intermittently for the county's Second XI, and in a match against Lancashire Seconds took 8 wickets for 44 runs.

Larwood was first called for full county duty on 20 August 1924, against Northamptonshire, at Trent Bridge. He bowled 26 overs in all, conceded 71 runs and took the wicket of Vallance Jupp, an experienced Test all-rounder. His assessment of his performance was negative: "I wasn't ready". Iremonger was much more positive, assuring Larwood that his bowling required only fine tuning. Larwood had also gained the support of the county captain, Arthur Carr, a powerful personality who decided that the new recruit had the makings of a future Test match bowler. "The best way to deal with him", Carr said later, "was as if he was my own son". Carr played a major part in encouraging and developing the young bowler's talents, and acted as Larwood's guiding spirit throughout the latter's career. (Note: Under Carr's influence Larwood developed tastes for beer and cigarettes. His biographer Duncan Hamilton writes: "An amalgam of alcohol and success loosened Larwood up, made him relax in company and brought him out of himself". Heavy beer consumption was a feature of Larwood's fast bowling career.)

Larwood had to wait until June 1925 for his next county match, which was against Yorkshire at Bramall Lane in Sheffield. Although Nottinghamshire lost the game, Larwood took three wickets, including that of Yorkshire's leading batsman Herbert Sutcliffe. From that point he became a regular member of the county side; he finished the season with 73 wickets at an average of 18.01, with best match figures of 11 for 41 (Note: In cricket reports, bowlers' match figures are usually represented in this way, meaning in this case that the bowler took 11 wickets and conceded 41 runs in the match. Seasonal or series bowling figures are usually given as total number of wickets and the average runs conceded per wicket.) against Worcestershire. From time to time he showed good form as a batsman, his best score being 70 against Northamptonshire.

=== Test cricketer ===
Larwood began the 1926 county season in good form; during a drawn match against Surrey, he twice took the wicket of Jack Hobbs, England's premier batsman and an influential voice with the national selectors. The Australians were in England, to defend the Ashes in a five-match Test series, and Carr had been appointed to captain England. Hobbs was convinced that Larwood was good enough to play for his country; this recommendation may have prompted the young bowler's inclusion in a "Test Trial" match at Lord's, early in June. Larwood took five wickets in the match, but was not selected for the first Test, which in any event was ruined by rain after barely an hour's play. For the second Test, due to begin at Lord's on 26 June, the selectors took a gamble and selected the youthful Larwood. His reaction when told by Carr was to protest that he was not good enough; Carr assured him that he was.

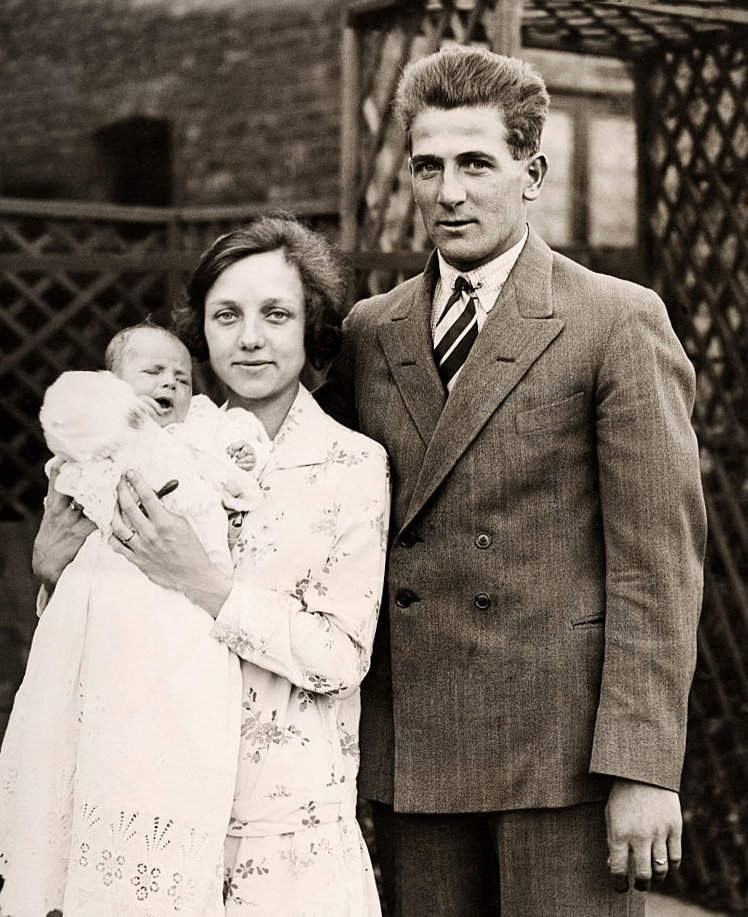
Larwood with wife Lois and daughter June

The Lord's Test was drawn, with neither side coming near to winning. Larwood took three high-profile wickets—Charlie Macartney, Jack Gregory and the Australian captain H. L. Collins—while conceding 136 runs. He thought his performance "wasn't great ... I wasted a lot of energy". He was not selected for the Third or Fourth Tests, both of which ended in draws; after the fourth match Carr, whose leadership had been criticised and whose batting form was poor, was replaced as England's captain by Percy Chapman for the series' decisive match at the Oval. Primarily at the urging of Hobbs, Larwood was recalled for this critical game. On a tumultuous final day the Australians, needing 415 to win, were bowled out for 125, the main bowling honours being shared between Larwood (3 wickets for 34) and the 49-year-old veteran Wilfred Rhodes (4 for 44), who had first appeared for England in 1899, five years before Larwood was born. The victory meant that England had secured the Ashes for the first time since 1912. Among many tributes recognising Larwood's performance was one from the former England captain Pelham Warner, who predicted a big future, but noted that "he must guard against bowling just short of a length".

In the 1926 season as a whole, Larwood took 137 wickets at 18.31; with the bat he scored 451 runs at 12.88. No Tests were played in 1927; Larwood's performances for Nottinghamshire, however, lifted him to the top of the national bowling averages—100 wickets at 16.95—and he was chosen as one of the five Wisden Cricketers of the Year. His efforts could not quite secure the County Championship title for Nottinghamshire; they finished second after losing their final match to Glamorgan. The 1927 season saw the first appearance in the Nottinghamshire side of Bill Voce, a 17-year-old ex-miner who, after beginning as a slow left-arm orthodox spin bowler, later became Larwood's principal fast bowling partner for county and country. At the season's end, Larwood was married, in a quiet and private ceremony, to Lois Bird, a miner's daughter whom he had first met in 1925.

Larwood did not join the Marylebone Cricket Club (MCC)'s weak team that toured South Africa in 1927–28 under the inexperienced R. T. Stanyforth. During 1928 Larwood appeared in two Tests against an emergent West Indies side that was playing its first series. He took six wickets in these matches, but his best performances that season were for Nottinghamshire. With 138 wickets at 14.51, Larwood once again headed the national bowling averages. As a batsman, his 626 runs at an average of 26.08 included his first century, 101 not out against Gloucestershire.

=== Australian tour, 1928–29 ===
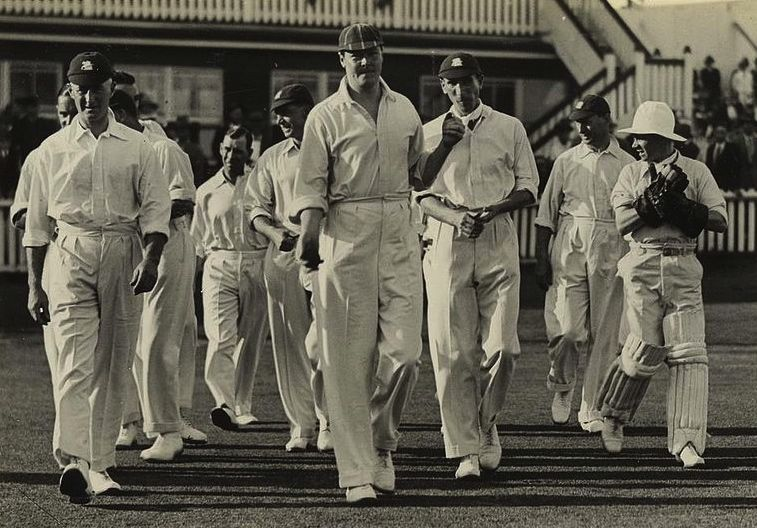
Chapman (centre) leads the England team on to the field during the Brisbane Test.

On the basis of his form, Larwood was an obvious choice for the MCC touring side that Chapman took to Australia in the English winter of 1928–29. In an early game against Victoria he took 7 for 51 in the state's first innings and scored 79 when MCC batted. One of his victims in the match was Bill Ponsford, the Australian Test opening batsman, who let slip his opinion that Larwood was "not really fast". According to the journalist and future Australian Test player Jack Fingleton, Ponsford was then targeted by Larwood. A month later at Brisbane, in the first Test of the series, Larwood dismissed him cheaply, twice; in the second Test, at Sydney, Ponsford scored 5 before a rapid delivery from Larwood broke a bone in his hand; Ponsford did not play again that summer.

England won the Brisbane Test by a record margin of 675 runs. Larwood took 6 for 32 in the Australian first innings, bowling at a speed that Wisden's S. J. Southerton described as "faster than I have ever seen him". According to Jardine's biographer Christopher Douglas, this bowling, which included a spell of 3 wickets in 5 overs for 9 runs, delivered a lasting blow to Australian morale and was a major factor in England's ultimate series victory. The match saw a low-key Test debut by Don Bradman, who scored 18 and 1 and was dropped for the second Test, before being rapidly reinstated for the third. England maintained their ascendancy during the second, third and fourth Tests, though with decreasing victory margins; Australia finally achieved success in the last match, giving England a 4–1 series victory. A combination of hard pitches, stifling heat, and long matches reduced Larwood's effectiveness as the tour progressed. He finished the Test series with 18 wickets at 40.22, behind George Geary (19 at 25.11) and Jack White (25 at 30.80). In all first-class matches on the tour, Larwood took 40 wickets at 31.35; as a batsman he scored 367 runs, averaging 26.21. Larwood's occasional tactic of bowling leg theory, that is, in the direction of the batsman's legs to a concentration of leg side fielders, had been noted by the Australian former bowler Arthur Mailey. In his report on the fourth Test, Mailey wrote, Larwood resorted to his "famous leg theory" after receiving severe punishment from the Australian batsman Archie Jackson, but the change brought no success: "All theories and all bowlers were alike to [Jackson]".

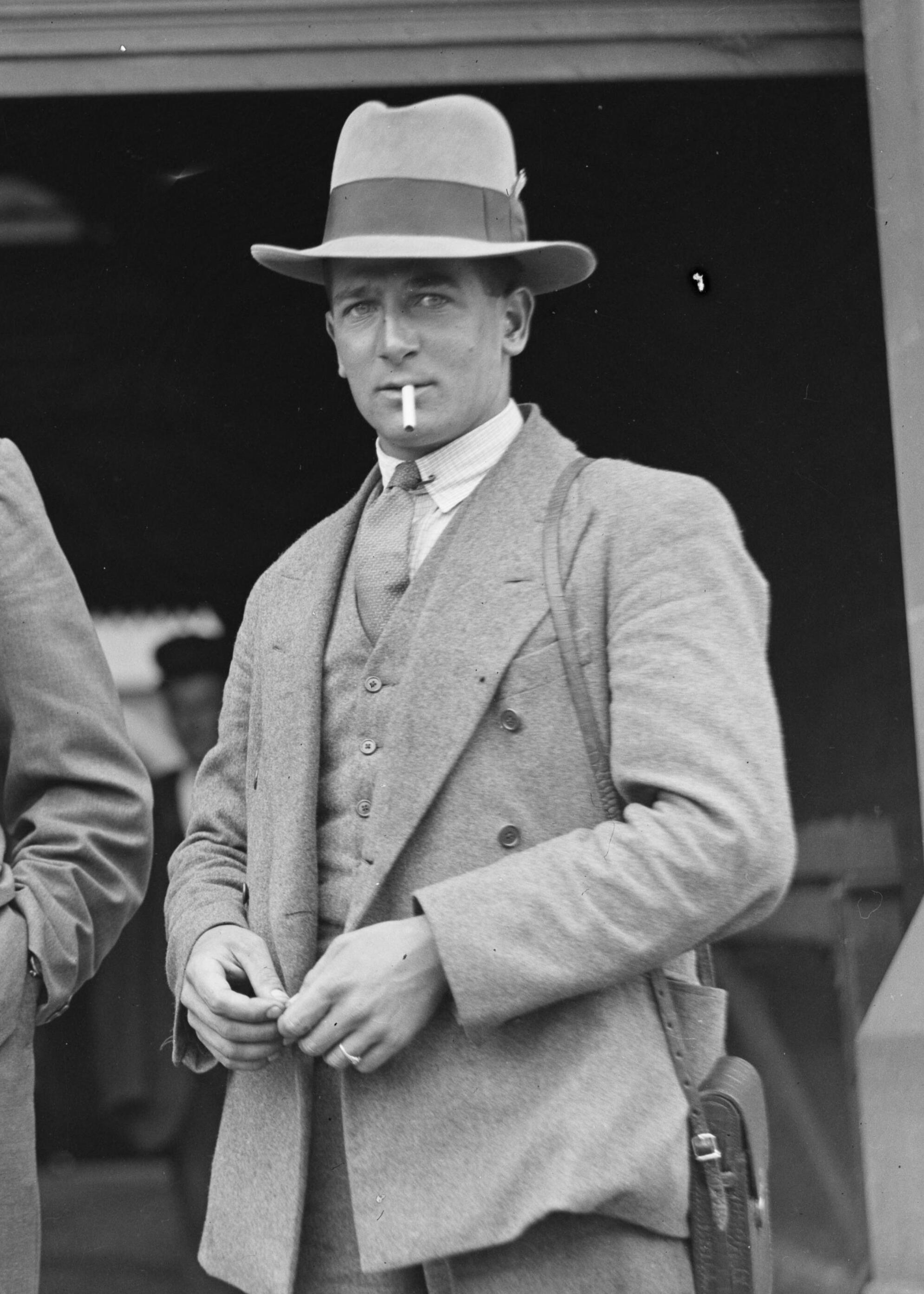
Larwood in Australia in February 1929

Southerton's tour report refers to the crowds' reactions to the England team, and in particular to the "barracking" of Larwood. This, he says, only once reached unacceptable proportions—during the game against Victoria that took place between the fourth and fifth Tests. This disturbance was apparently sparked by Chapman's decision to put Larwood on to bowl against Victoria's weakest batsman, Bert Ironmonger. In general, Southerton felt that crowd noise was no worse than that accorded to previous touring teams and that, "objectionable though it may appear to be to us in England, it has grown up with Australian cricket and is recognised by the public out there as part of their day's enjoyment". Larwood's view was that "it was a bit too thick at times ... I got called every name you can imagine, and every four-letter word you can think of was used against me". The Surrey amateur batsman Douglas Jardine, was likewise a target of the crowds, and as a result formed a cordial dislike for Australians—which was fully reciprocated.

=== Bradman in 1930 ===
Back in England for the 1929 season, Larwood made three Test appearances against the visiting South Africans, for modest returns: a total of eight wickets at 23.25, and with the bat 50 runs at 12.50. He was injured during the third Test, and thus missed the last two games of the series and several county matches. His overall bowling figures for the 1929 season were less impressive than in the two previous years; with 117 wickets at 21.66 he fell to 25th place in the national averages. The 20-year-old Voce, whose fast-medium bowling style had now fully developed, was the county's most successful bowler. Together, Larwood and Voce helped Nottinghamshire to secure the County Championship that had narrowly evaded them two years earlier. Ahead of the Australians' visit to England in 1930 there was some confidence in English cricketing circles, since Chapman's victorious 1928–29 side was largely intact and on paper looked formidably strong, especially in batting. England duly won the first Test, at Trent Bridge, by 93 runs, despite a second-innings century from Bradman that for a time threatened to turn the match. Larwood's active participation was curtailed by an attack of gastritis; he took 2 wickets in the match for 21 runs.

Bradman put England through the hoop. Larwood, Tate. Geary, Tyldesley, Hammond, and Leyland was not, on paper, a disreputable attack. But it was cut to pieces—not so much butchered as dissected and destroyed with a surgeon's knife.

— E.W. Swanton on Bradman at Headingley, 1930

His illness meant that Larwood missed the second Test, at Lord's, which saw Australia score a record 729 for 6 including a rapid 254 from Bradman, at the time the highest individual Test score in England. Australia won the game by seven wickets, to draw level 1–1 in the five-match series. Larwood returned to the England side for the third Test, at Headingley, Leeds. He later claimed that his first ball to Bradman, before the batsman had scored, was a bouncer that touched the edge of the bat and was caught by the wicket-keeper, George Duckworth: "You could hear the snick all over the ground". The umpire, however, gave Bradman not out. (Note: Of Larwood's claim, Roland Perry in his biography of Bradman writes: "[Larwood] made a spurious claim about having [Bradman] caught early in the big Leeds innings. But none of the England team, the umpires or the spectators recalled it ... It was pure wishful thinking".) Bradman went on to compile 334, beating his record score of two weeks earlier. Larwood's one wicket in the Australian innings cost 139 runs; England were saved from probable defeat when the game was shortened by rain. The England selectors dropped Larwood from the team for the fourth Test, in which Bradman was limited to 14 runs, but the game was rained off after just over two days' play. Larwood was recalled for the final Test at the Oval that, as in 1926, would determine the series victor. In a game with no time limit, Australia replied to England's 405 with 695 (Bradman 232), then dismissed England for 251 to win by an innings and 39 runs. Larwood's single wicket—Bradman, for the first time in Tests—cost 132 runs. In the three Tests in which he played, Larwood took 4 wickets for 292; Bradman, he admitted, had "pasted me unmercifully". Commentators recognised the danger that Bradman presented to English hopes; the former England bowler Percy Fender, who was captain of Surrey and a respected cricket journalist, was convinced that "something new will have to be introduced to curb Bradman". Warner was explicit: "England must evolve a new type of bowler and develop fresh ideas and strange tactics to curb his almost uncanny skill".

=== Prelude to bodyline ===
Apart from his treatment by Bradman, Larwood was successful in 1930, rising to fourth place in the national bowling averages (99 wickets at 16.38). He also batted well on occasions, including a not-out century against Northamptonshire. He was not selected for the 1930–31 tour of South Africa, and for the next two years he concentrated mainly on domestic cricket. He made one Test appearance in 1931, against New Zealand, in a rain-ruined game in which he neither batted nor bowled. He headed the domestic bowling averages in 1931 and 1932, in the latter year with 162 wickets at 12.86, the best seasonal figures of his career. However, because of his poor Test record in 1930, Larwood thought his chances of selection for the 1932–33 tour to Australia were slim. The 1932 Test trial was limited to half a day's play, during which Larwood bowled 15 overs for a single wicket. Nevertheless, to his great relief he was selected for the tour, as was Voce, who had been England's most successful bowler during the South African tour of 1930–31.

In 1931, with the 1932–33 series in mind, the selectors had appointed Jardine as England's captain. In his efforts to build a strategy whereby he could threaten the Australian supremacy, the new captain consulted widely. Along with other observers, including Duckworth (who had kept wicket for England during the 1930 Oval Test) he thought that Bradman showed a dislike for fast, rising balls, and had been shaken when one such delivery from Larwood had hit him in the chest. This matter had been widely discussed among cricketers; a clip of film from the Oval match appeared to confirm that Bradman had flinched. This, to Jardine, suggested the basis of a plan: a sustained attack of fast leg theory that might unsettle not just Bradman but the Australian batsmen generally.

Leg theory bowling was not new; Larwood, Voce and others had employed it, generally for short periods, as had several Australians including Jack Scott, who in 1928–29 dismissed Jardine and Herbert Sutcliffe using this tactic. What Jardine planned was a sustained leg stump attack, used in conjunction with a semicircle of close leg-side fielders ready to pounce on any mistimed shot. He found a willing ally in Carr, who, though no longer playing Test cricket, still captained Nottinghamshire and had, according to Hamilton, "an almost carnivorous appetite for trying to humiliate the Australians and grinding them, and especially Bradman, into the dirt". At a private dinner at the Piccadilly Hotel, which Jardine and Carr arranged shortly after the announcement of the 1932–33 touring party, Larwood and Voce were quizzed about leg theory. Larwood later recalled the conversation thus:

Jardine asked me if I could bowl on the leg stump making the ball come up into the body all the time, so that Bradman had to play his shots to leg. "Yes, I think that can be done", I said ... I had no doubt of its purpose: we thought Don was frightened of sharp rising balls, and we reasoned that if he got a lot of them he would be ... intimidated and eventually, having to direct his shots to leg all the time, would give a catch to one of the [leg-side] fieldsmen".

In pursuit of his plans, Jardine took advice on fielding positions from Frank Foster, who had bowled a form of medium-fast leg theory during the 1911–12 series in Australia with much success, taking 32 wickets at 21.63. Larwood did not at the time consider Jardine's proposed tactics as either novel or controversial. His priority was to contain Bradman, so "any scheme that would keep him in check appealed to me a great deal". In county matches following the Piccadilly Hotel dinner, Larwood and Voce tried the tactics out, with mixed results. Two Essex batsmen sustained injuries as their side struggled with the unfamiliar bowling, at one stage losing 8 wickets for 52 runs. However, Glamorgan, reckoned to be a weak batting side, scored more than 500 against the experimental attack; spectators, including the future cricket writer and commentator John Arlott, were puzzled by the ineffectiveness of the bowling. Arlott later reasoned that what appeared weak bowling on English pitches would be a different proposition on the much faster Australian pitches. Hostile fast bowling was not confined to Larwood and Voce; in Yorkshire's match against Surrey at The Oval, Bill Bowes bowled a series of bouncers, bringing protests from Hobbs and press criticism from Warner.

=== Australian tour, 1932–33 ===
The MCC party that sailed for Australia on 17 September 1932 contained four fast bowlers: Larwood, Voce, Bowes and G.O. "Gubby" Allen, the Middlesex amateur. Warner was manager of the side; he had captained two tours to Australia prior to 1914 and was a popular figure there. The manager's role, as the tour's historian Laurence Le Quesne remarks, was at the time less influential than that of the captain, who had absolute authority on the field of play.

Prior to the Test series, the party played matches against State sides and selected Australian elevens. The intended fast leg theory attack was not revealed until the fifth of these games, against "An Australian XI" (including Bradman), which began at Melbourne on 18 November. Larwood dismissed Bradman for low scores in each of the Australian innings, writing later: "It was a refreshing sight to see [him] clumsily waving his bat in the air". Hobbs, who having retired from Test cricket was reporting the tour for London's The Star newspaper, thought that the bowling had shaken Bradman's confidence: "He was drawing away, sure proof that he didn't like the bumpers". The English tactics in the game offended the crowds and so upset H.V. Evatt (later leader of the Australian Labor Party, then a High Court judge) that he lost all desire to watch any of that year's Tests.

The first Test began at the Sydney Cricket Ground on 2 December 1932, and was played in a tense and heated atmosphere. Bradman, whose discomfort and poor form against the tourists' bowling in the preparatory games had become sources of anxiety, was prevented from playing by illness. England won the game by 10 wickets; Larwood's match figures were 10 for 124, with only limited use of fast leg theory. The match's most successful batsman was Australia's Stan McCabe, who scored 187 in his side's first innings, attacking both the orthodox and leg theory attacks in a "death or glory" approach. During the match Hugh Buggy, a reporter for the Melbourne Herald, used the word "bodyline" to describe the English leg theory bowling. The term was soon universally adopted in Australia, though English sources continued to refer to "leg theory". The second Test, at Melbourne beginning 30 December, was played on a much slower pitch that blunted the English pace attack. Larwood was further handicapped by pains from sore feet, caused by a new pair of boots. Bradman returned to the Australian side and scored a century, guiding his team to victory by 111 runs; his success led many commentators to suppose that fast leg theory would thenceforth prove ineffective. The series was tied 1–1 and, in the words of the writer-historian Ronald Blythe, "all was sweetness and light".

The bodyline strategy in action: Woodfull (extreme left) ducks under a ball, while five fielders wait on the leg side. The wicket-keeper, Leslie Ames, is centre picture; Jardine is third from right

The third Test, which began at Adelaide on 13 January 1933, has been characterised by Wisden as "probably the most unpleasant [Test match] ever played". Bill Woodfull, the Australian captain, was struck over the heart by a ball from Larwood and was incapacitated for several minutes. Larwood had been bowling to an orthodox field; on Woodfull's resumption, to the crowd's amazed hostility, Jardine switched to the leg theory attack. (Note: In his own account of the match, Jardine reports that he adopted the leg side field after receiving a signal from Larwood that the change should be made.) "What could be clearer", wrote Swanton, "than that at the root of these leg-theory tactics was the threat of physical injury?". Larwood then knocked Woodfull's bat from his hands, bringing further demonstrations from the crowd. Later in the innings a Larwood delivery struck Bert Oldfield on the head, causing his retirement from the match. The crowd's reaction was such that Larwood thought a full-scale invasion of the pitch might follow: "If one man jumps the fence the whole mob will go for us".

Bodyline bowling assumed such proportions as to menace best interests of game ... causing intensely bitter feeling between players as well as injury. In our opinion is unsportsmanlike. Unless stopped at once likely to upset friendly relations existing between Australia and England.

— Australian Board of Control's cable to MCC, 18 January 1933

England eventually won by 338 runs; Larwood's total of seven wickets in the match was exceeded by Allen's eight, earned by orthodox style fast bowling. While the game was still in progress, the Australian Board of Control cabled the MCC, protesting the English tactics with a direct accusation of unsportsmanlike conduct. In reply, MCC rejected the Australian Board's charges and insisted that they withdraw the charge of bad sportsmanship. The row escalated into high diplomatic and political circles, and drew in the Australian prime minister, Joseph Lyons, the governor of South Australia, Sir Alexander Hore-Ruthven, and the British Dominions secretary, J.H. Thomas. Ultimately it was decided that the matter should be referred to the Imperial Cricket Conference (ICC), with a view to a possible change in the rules relating to bowling. Jardine had stated that he would not lead his team in another Test unless the "unsportsmanlike" charge was withdrawn. On 8 February, two days before the fourth Test was due to begin at Brisbane, the Australian Board clarified that, while they continued to find bodyline objectionable, "we do not consider the sportsmanship of your team as being in question".

In the fourth Test, which England won to retain the Ashes, Larwood curtailed his use of bodyline on an unreceptive pitch. The match passed without untoward incident; on the final day came news of the death of Archie Jackson, who had been ill for months with tuberculosis. Two days earlier he had sent Larwood a telegram: "Congratulations magnificent bowling good luck in all matches"; Larwood kept this as a souvenir for the rest of his life. In the final Test, at Sydney, several Australian batsmen were hit, but their improving technique against this style of bowling enabled them to score 435, their highest innings total of the series. Larwood's main contribution to this game was as a batsman; sent in as a nightwatchman, he batted well into the following day to score 98. In the Australians' second innings Larwood suffered a serious injury to his left foot, the legacy of much bowling on hard, unyielding pitches. Although he could no longer bowl, Jardine would not let him leave the field while Bradman was still batting, believing that Larwood's continuing presence represented a psychological threat. When Bradman was out, he and Larwood left the field together, although no words were exchanged. England won the match to secure a 4–1 series victory.

The injury ended Larwood's tour at that point. While the rest of the team fulfilled the final Australian fixtures before embarking on a short tour of New Zealand, Larwood returned to England on board SS Otranto. In the Test matches he had been England's most successful bowler, with 33 wickets at 19.52. As a batsman he had scored 145 runs, averaging 24.16. In all first-class matches on the tour he took 64 wickets at 13.89 and scored 358 runs at 23.45.

=== Aftermath ===
When the Australians come here they are treated as gentlemen. When we go to Australia we have to suffer cheap wit from an unsportsmanlike gang which would not be tolerated for a moment here ... The Australians may not like my bowling. Well, I do not like their howling.

— From Larwood's article in the Sunday Express, 7 May 1933.

On his return home, despite massive press and public interest Larwood was bound by his contract with the MCC to remain silent until the main party returned. On 7 May 1933, the day after their arrival, he gave in a Sunday Express article a strong defence of what he continued to call "leg theory". Woodfull, he said, was too slow, and Bradman too scared: "Richardson and McCabe played me all right, Woodfull and Bradman could not". He was highly critical of the Australian crowds who, he said, knew nothing of cricket—all they wanted was for Bradman to score runs. In mid-May, in a hastily prepared, ghost-written book entitled Bodyline? that was serialised in the Sunday Dispatch, Larwood elaborated on his themes of Australian batting failures and crowd hooliganism. By this time the 1933 cricket season was in full swing; bodyline bowling was being widely practised, by Bowes, Voce and by the fast bowlers in the visiting West Indies touring side, Learie Constantine and E.A. Martindale. Larwood's writings were inconvenient for the MCC committee which, now more aware of the intimidatory aspects of bodyline, was revising its position and was more inclined to appease Australian feelings.

The injury to Larwood's foot meant that he scarcely bowled for Nottinghamshire in 1933. However, such was his drawing power that the county continued to play him as a batsman until mid-July, when his unfitness prematurely ended his season. Meanwhile, on 28 April the Australian Board had unilaterally adopted a regulation that specifically outlawed bodyline bowling in Australia; MCC's initial response was to declare this law impractical, but as the events of the season unfolded they modified their stance. The ICC meeting on 31 July produced no immediate resolution, but did elicit a verbal promise from the MCC that bodyline would not be used in the projected 1934 tour by the Australians. In exchanges of telegrams with the Australian Board, the MCC still contrived to avoid a specific commitment, while emphasising that they had "always agreed that a form of bowling which is obviously a direct attack by the bowler upon the batsman would be an offence against the spirit of the game". On that basis, the Australian Board agreed to the 1934 tour.

By the beginning of the 1934 season Larwood was fit again, and it was anticipated that he would play in the Tests. Jardine had earlier issued an unequivocal statement that he would not play. By way of confirming their commitment not to use bodyline, the MCC committee decided that Larwood should apologise to the Australians for his bowling on the 1932–33 tour. No such apology had been requested from Jardine; Larwood refused to do so, insisting that he had bowled precisely as instructed by his captain. Shortly before the second Test, he wrote in the Sunday Dispatch that he was unrepentant about leg theory, adding: "I doubt if I shall ever play against [the Australians] again, at least in big cricket". Larwood's Test career thus ended. In its review of the 1934 season, Wisden commented: "No greater disservice was ever done to English cricket than when Larwood was induced to dash into print and become responsible for statements which put him beyond the pale of being selected for England".

Larwood continued to play for Nottinghamshire for several more seasons, with considerable success: 82 wickets at 17.25 in 1934, 102 at 22.70 in 1935 and in 1936, his benefit season, 119 at 12.97. The 18-year-old future Test batsman Denis Compton, in his second county match for Middlesex, faced Larwood in June 1936; he later recorded that Larwood and Voce were the most accurate fast bowlers he ever faced, and that Larwood was the fastest. The benefit season yielded the then county record sum of £2,098. In the English winter of 1936–37, while an MCC team led by Allen toured Australia, Larwood took a coaching job in India. The climate and the food disagreed with him, and he returned home early. His bowling achievements in 1937 were modest: 70 wickets at 24.57. Larwood's relations with Nottinghamshire had steadily deteriorated since Carr's dismissal from the captaincy in 1934; his foot problem returned, and was aggravated by a cartilage injury to his left knee. In 1938, after a few matches, he left the county by mutual agreement and retired from first-class cricket. In his first-class career he took 1,427 wickets at 17.51, and scored 7,290 runs at 19.91 including three centuries. In Tests he took 78 wickets at 28.35 and scored 485 runs at 19.40.

== Retirement ==
=== Obscurity in England ===
After playing League cricket for Blackpool in 1939, on the outbreak of war Larwood left the game altogether, to work away from the public eye as a market gardener. In 1946 he used his savings to buy a sweet shop in Blackpool. Although he generally kept away from organised cricket and avoided all personal publicity, he was persuaded to attend a farewell luncheon for Don Bradman at the end of the Australians' 1948 tour. He and Bradman exchanged polite courtesies, though he was warmly welcomed by other members of the Australian team, including their premier fast bowler Ray Lindwall. The following year Larwood became one of 26 former professional Test cricketers awarded honorary membership of the MCC. This recognition, he said, went some way to help heal the hurt he had felt over his treatment by the game's ruling body 15 years earlier.

=== Emigration to Australia ===
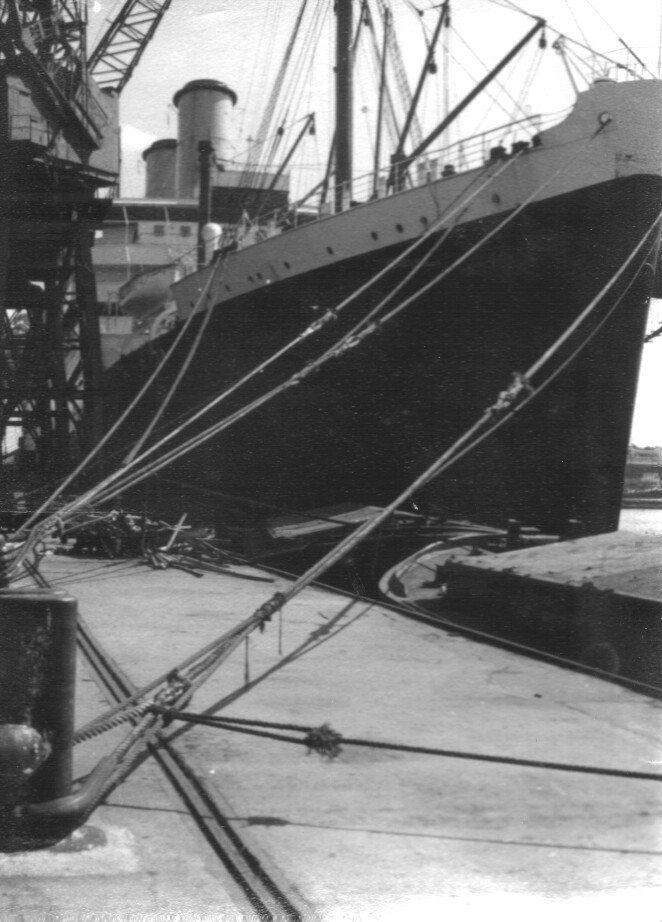
SS Orontes, the ship that took Jardine's party to Australia in 1932, and on which Larwood emigrated to Australia in 1950

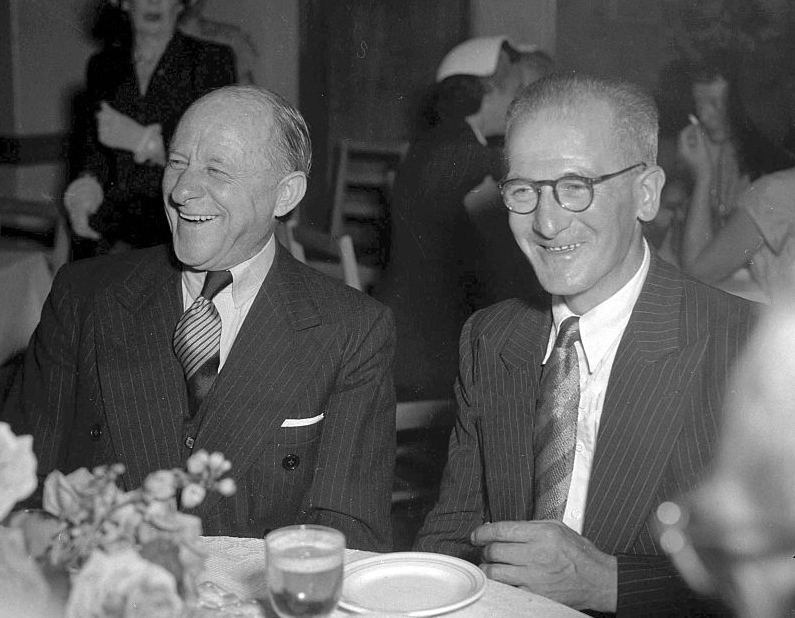
Bert Oldfield and Harold Larwood in Australia, 14 January 1954

In the economic austerity of post-war Britain, Larwood's business made little money. He was persuaded, largely by his erstwhile opponent Jack Fingleton, that he would find better prospects and a warm welcome in Australia, and he decided to emigrate there with his family, which by then included five daughters. On 1 April 1950 the Larwoods sailed on SS Orontes, the ship that had carried Jardine's party 18 years previously. On arrival in Australia the welcome was warm and immediate. During their initial weeks in a Sydney hotel, unbeknown to them half their bills were paid by the former prime minister Ben Chifley. Despite a housing shortage, the family was soon settled in a bungalow in the Sydney suburb of Kingsford, and Larwood found steady employment with a soft drinks firm. Fingleton later arranged a meeting between Larwood and Chifley; their respective broad Nottinghamshire and Australian accents meant that neither could understand the other, and Fingleton had to act as an interpreter.

From time to time Larwood supplemented his wages by commenting on cricket for newspapers and broadcasters. At first he was treated with some suspicion by English touring teams; in 1950–51 when he visited the English dressing room he received a cold reception from the England captain, F.R. Brown. Four years later, according to Larwood, he was kept out of the dressing room by Trevor Bailey, the 1954–55 team's vice captain—though Bailey denied that this ever happened. However, from the early 1960s onwards Larwood was often visited by members of England teams, and he became a regular and welcome guest in English dressing rooms. He sometimes went to cricket events where he would occasionally meet Don Bradman; relations between the two, though outwardly cordial, remained essentially cold.

In 1977 Larwood attended the Centenary Test match at the Melbourne Cricket Ground, along with many survivors of old Ashes battles. As on similar past occasions he had to be persuaded to go; later he would describe it as "one of the best days of my life". His presence created considerable interest among generations of cricket followers to whom the bodyline series was distant history. Later that year he visited England, and watched England's cricketers play Australia at Trent Bridge, his old home ground; this was one of several trips he made to his home country, the last of which was in 1980. In 1982, the 50th anniversary of the bodyline series was commemorated with much publicity, some of which brought a revival of hate mail and hostility towards Larwood.

=== Final years and death ===
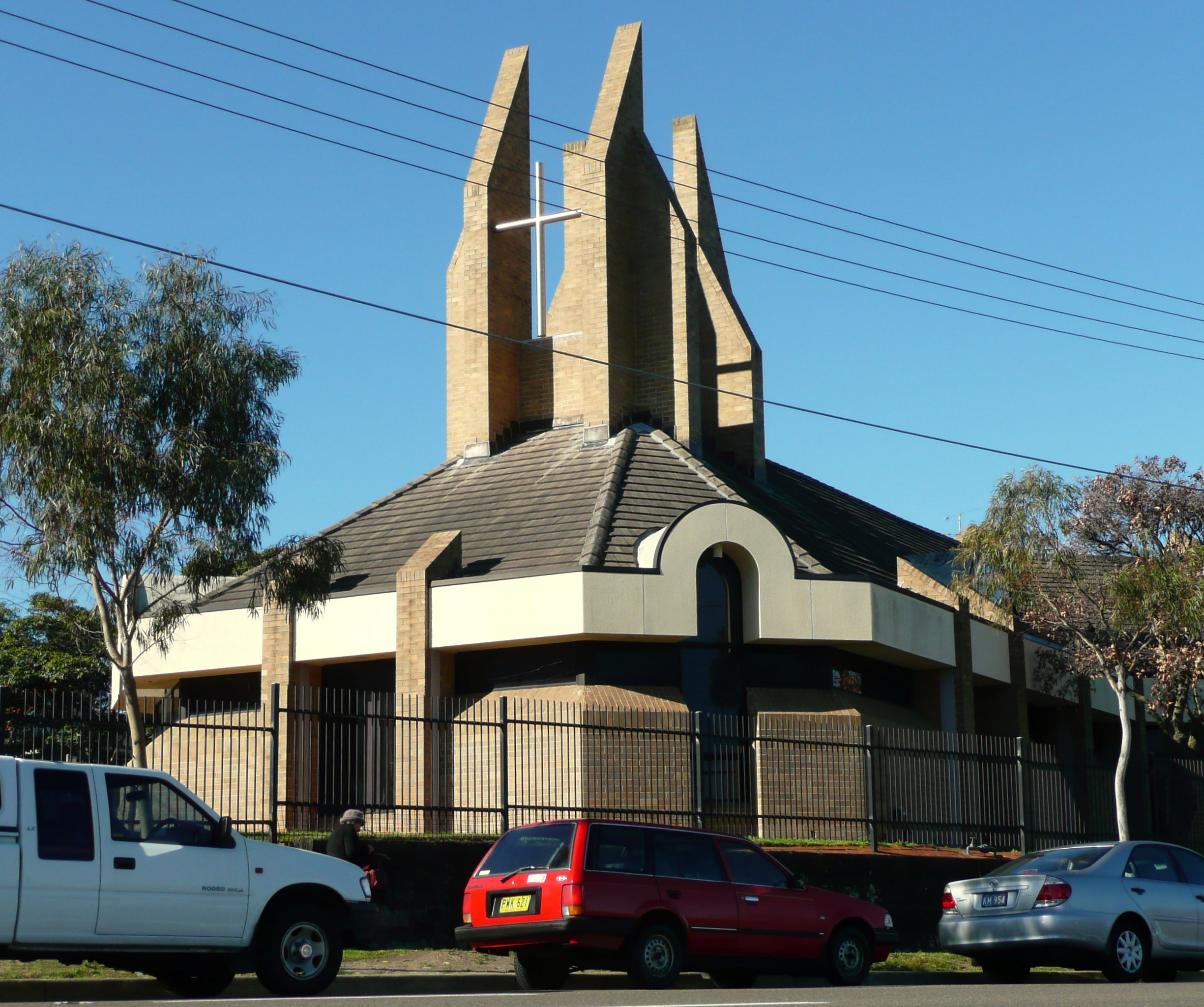
Holy Trinity Church, Kingsford, where Larwood's ashes were interred

As he grew older, Larwood increasingly spoke out on current cricket issues. He was particularly critical of the proliferation of protective clothing in the 1970s, and considered Ian Botham, the England all-rounder, over-rated: his bowling "wouldn't burst a paper bag". He was unimpressed by the 1984 Australian television miniseries Bodyline which he considered inaccurate and at risk of reawakening ill-feelings he thought best forgotten. In 1985 he was given honorary life membership of the Sydney Cricket Ground and, in England, the Larwood and Voce Stand was opened at Trent Bridge. In June 1993, in the Queen's Birthday Honours List, Larwood was appointed an MBE for services to cricket. Of this award, Today newspaper commented: "At last the ruling classes honour the man who carried the can for their savage arrogance".

In his final years, Larwood withdrew his claims that Bradman had been frightened of him, and acknowledged his Australian foe as the greatest batsman of all time. He was gradually losing his sight, although he retained his alertness, and on his 90th birthday was able to join in a game of garden cricket with his great-grandchildren. He died in hospital on 22 July 1995, following a brief illness, in his 91st year. He was cremated, and his ashes placed in a memorial wall at Holy Trinity Anglican Church in Kingsford. A plaque with a simple inscription was placed on the wall by his daughters. His wife Lois died in 2001, and her ashes were placed alongside his.

== Style and influence ==
One could tell his art by his run to the wickets. It was a poem of athletic grace, as each muscle gave over to the other with perfect balance and the utmost power. He began his long run slowly ... his legs and arms pistoned up his speed, and as he neared the wickets he was in very truth like the Flying Scotsman thundering through an east coast station.

— Fingleton's description of Larwood's bowling

Larwood has been widely acknowledged as the greatest fast bowler of his generation and, according to his Wisden obituary, was "one of the rare fast bowlers in the game's long history to spread terror in opposition ranks by the mere mention of his name". Timing technology was primitive in his day, but various tests indicated speeds of between 90 and 100 mph (140 and 160 km/h). (Note: A ball bowled by Shoaib Akhtar of Pakistan, on 27 April 2002, was timed at 100 mph using electronic technology. This is the only ball officially timed at this speed, although other bowlers have achieved speeds in the upper 90s. These figures relate to individual deliveries rather than average speeds.) Fingleton commented that Larwood was "about twice as fast as anyone out there", indicating a match in progress at Trent Bridge. However, one Australian from an earlier cricketing generation, Ernie Jones, dismissed Larwood: "He wouldn't knock a dint in a pound of butter on a hot day".

At around 5 feet 7 inches, Larwood was short for a fast bowler, although he had long arms in relation to his height. His lower bowling trajectory helped the ball to retain speed. His side-on bowling action, following a smooth and almost soundless approach, was described by the Manchester Guardian's cricket correspondent Neville Cardus as "absolutely classical, left side showing down the wicket before the arm swung over with a thrilling vehement rhythm". Facing Larwood at his fastest was, according to Hamilton, "akin to a public stoning". Hobbs, who batted against him many times in county matches, thought him not just the fastest but the most accurate bowler he had ever seen. Among later fast bowlers influenced by Larwood's style was Ray Lindwall, Australia's bowling star of the 1940s and 1950s, who watched the bodyline series as a schoolboy and modelled his own action on Larwood's.

Larwood said he did not intend to hit batsmen, though "I didn't shed any crocodile tears if a batsman was hit in the thigh". In a press interview in 1990 he admitted that he "might sometimes have bowled at a batsman's ribs, but never at his head". He did from time to time inflict serious injuries on his opponents: Reg Sinfield of Gloucestershire, Patsy Hendren of Middlesex and H. B. Cameron of South Africa were all carried unconscious from the field after being hit by high-speed deliveries. Many others suffered discomfort in the form of bruises and minor fractures. In Australia, in the wake of the bodyline series, a music hall song summed up many apprehensive batsmen's feelings:

With a prayer and a curse they prepare for the hearse,
Undertakers look on with broad grins.
Oh, they'd be a lot calmer in Ned Kelly's armour
When Larwood the wrecker begins.

== Notes and references ==
Notes

Citations

== Sources ==
- Arlott, John (1990). Basingstoke Boy. London: Willow Books. ISBN 0-00-218351-X.
- Birley, Derek (2000). A Social History of English Cricket. London: Aurum Press. ISBN 1-85410-710-0.
- Blythe, Ronald (1964). The Age of Illusion. Harmondsworth, UK: Penguin Books. OCLC 10971329.
- Compton, Denis (1948). Playing for England. London: Samson, Low, Marston & Co. OCLC 792776114.
- Douglas, Christopher (1984). Douglas Jardine: Spartan Cricketer. Hemel Hempstead, UK: George Allen and Unwin. ISBN 0-04-796083-3.
- Fingleton, Jack (1984). Cricket Crisis. London: The Pavilion Library. ISBN 0-907516-68-8. [First published 1946]
- Frindall, Bill (1980). The Wisden Book of Test Cricket 1876–77 to 1977–78. London: Macdonald and Jane's. ISBN 0-354-08535-2.
- Frith, David (2002). Bodyline Autopsy. London: Aurum Press. ISBN 1-85410-931-6.
- Hamilton, Duncan (2009). Harold Larwood. London: Quercus. ISBN 978-1-84916-207-4.
- Jardine, Douglas (1933). In Quest of the Ashes. London: Hutchinson & Co. OCLC 774642047.
- Larwood, Harold and Perkins, Kevin (1985). The Larwood Story. Harmondsworth, UK: Penguin Books. ISBN 0-14-007018-4. [First published 1965]
- Le Quesne, Laurence (1983). The Bodyline Controversy. London: Unwin Paperbacks. ISBN 0-04-796098-1.
- Parkinson, Michael (1984). "Introduction". In Fingleton, Parkinson (ed.). Cricket Crisis. London: The Pavilion Library. ISBN 0-907516-68-8.
- Perry, Roland (2001). The Don, 1908–2001. London: Virgin Books. ISBN 0-7535-0408-1.
- Swanton, E.W. (1962). A History of Cricket (Volume II). London: George Allen and Unwin. OCLC 17890016.
- Webber, Roy (1953). The Australians in England. London: Hodder & Stoughton. OCLC 2944003.
