= Joe Hardstaff (RAF officer) =

English officer and cricketer (1935–2022)

Joseph Hardstaff MBE (28 February 1935 – 22 November 2022) was an Air Commodore in the Royal Air Force and a first-class cricketer.

Joe Hardstaff was born in Kirkby-in-Ashfield, Nottinghamshire, and was the third member in successive generations to represent his family in first-class cricket. His grandfather Joe Sr. and his father Joe Jr. both represented England and Nottinghamshire. His grandfather also stood as a Test umpire.

Hardstaff was commissioned into the Royal Air Force and rose to the rank of Air Commodore. He played cricket for the Free Foresters in two first-class matches in 1961 and 1962. He also captained the Royal Air Force cricket team and played for the Combined Services cricket team, as well as representing the Marylebone Cricket Club, as a right-handed batsman and right-arm medium-fast bowler.

He served as President of the RAF and Combined Services cricket clubs. He succeeded Lieutenant-Colonel Peter Packham as Secretary of Middlesex County Cricket Club in 1989, and retired in 1997.

Hardstaff died on 22 November 2022, aged 87.

Sporting positions
Preceded by Peter Packham	Middlesex County Cricket Club Secretary; 1989–1997	Succeeded by Vinny Codrington
