= English cricket team in New Zealand in 1936–37 =

The MCC team that toured Australia in the 1936–37 season also played three first-class matches in New Zealand at the end of the tour in March and April 1937. They played no Test matches in New Zealand, although one of the matches was against a representative New Zealand XI, all of whose team members went on the tour of England barely six weeks later where three Test matches were played.

== Representative match ==
24–27 March 1937 (3-day match)
Scorecard

Marylebone Cricket Club	v	New Zealand
427 (150 overs); RES Wyatt 144; ML Page 2/38 (7 overs)		265 (92.2 overs); HG Vivian 88; W Voce 4/50 (21 overs)
		163 (f/o) (53.5 overs); WA Hadlee 82; JM Sims 4/35 (15.5 overs)

Match drawn
Basin Reserve, Wellington
Umpires: OR Montgomery and CW Moore

- MCC won the toss and elected to bat.
- 26 March was taken as a rest day
