= International cricket in 1936–37 =

International cricket season

The 1936–37 international cricket season was from September 1936 to April 1937.

== Season overview ==
International tours
Start date	Home team	Away team	Results [Matches]			
Start date	Home team	Away team	Test	ODI	FC	LA
4 December 1936	Australia	England	3–2 [5]	—	—	—
18 March 1937	Ceylon	England	—	—	0–1 [1]	—
19 March 1937	New Zealand	Marylebone	—	—	0–0 [1]	—

== December ==
=== England in Australia ===
The Ashes Test series
No.	Date	Home captain	Away captain	Venue	Result
Test 255	4–9 December	Donald Bradman	Gubby Allen	The Gabba, Brisbane	England by 322 runs
Test 256	18–22 December	Donald Bradman	Gubby Allen	Sydney Cricket Ground, Sydney	England by an innings and 22 runs
Test 257	1–7 January	Donald Bradman	Gubby Allen	Melbourne Cricket Ground, Melbourne	Australia by 365 runs
Test 258	29 Jan–4 February	Donald Bradman	Gubby Allen	Adelaide Oval, Adelaide	Australia by 148 runs
Test 259	26 Feb–3 March	Donald Bradman	Gubby Allen	Melbourne Cricket Ground, Melbourne	Australia by an innings and 200 runs

== March ==
=== England in Ceylon ===
Three-day Match
No.	Date	Home captain	Away captain	Venue	Result
Match	18–20 March	DA Wright	Denys Morkel	Victoria Park, Colombo	Sir Julien Cahn's XI by 6 wickets

=== MCC in New Zealand ===
First-class match
No.	Date	Home captain	Away captain	Venue	Result
Match	24–27 March	Curly Page	Gubby Allen	Basin Reserve, Wellington	Match drawn
