= Vinny Codrington =

English cricket administrator

Personal information
- Full name: Vincent Joseph Codrington
- Born: 18 July 1956 (age 70); London, England

Vincent Joseph Codrington (born 18 July 1956) is an English sports administrator and a former CEO of Middlesex County Cricket Club.

Codrington was educated at St. Benedict's School, Ealing. He played rugby union as a fly half for Richmond and also served as its Director of Rugby, during its transition from amateur to professional rugby. He opened the batting for Barnes Cricket Club.

Codrington succeeded Joe Hardstaff as Secretary of Middlesex County Cricket Club in 1997 and later assumed the role of Chief Executive. He announced his resignation on 3 July 2015 after 18 years' service at Lord's. He is a Trustee of the READY Charity

Sporting positions
Preceded by New appointment	Middlesex CCC Chief Executive; 1999–2015	Succeeded by Richard Goatley
Preceded by Joe Hardstaff	Middlesex CCC Secretary; 1997–2015	Succeeded by Richard Goatley
