= Bill Voce =

English cricketer

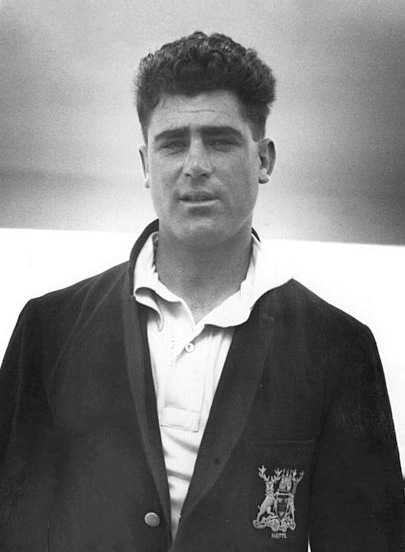
- Voce in 1932

Personal information
- Full name: William Voce
- Born: 8 August 1909; Annesley Woodhouse, Nottinghamshire, England
- Died: 6 June 1984 (aged 74); Lenton, Nottingham, Nottinghamshire, England
- Batting: Right-handed
- Bowling: Left arm fast-medium

International information
- National side: England
- Test debut (cap 253): 11 January 1930 v West Indies
- Last Test: 7 January 1947 v Australia

Domestic team information
- Years: Team
- 1927–1952: Nottinghamshire

Career statistics
Competition	Test	First-class
Matches	27	426
Runs scored	308	7,590
Batting average	13.39	19.21
100s/50s	0/1	4/26
Top score	66	129
Balls bowled	6,360	85,428
Wickets	98	1,558
Bowling average	27.88	23.08
5 wickets in innings	3	84
10 wickets in match	2	20
Best bowling	7/70	8/30
Catches/stumpings	15/–	288/–
- Source: Cricinfo, 6 March 2009

Bill Voce (8 August 1909 – 6 June 1984) was an English cricketer who played for Nottinghamshire and England. As a fast bowler, he was an instrumental part of England's infamous Bodyline strategy in their tour of Australia in 1932–1933 under Douglas Jardine. He was born at Annesley Woodhouse, near Kirkby-in-Ashfield, Nottinghamshire. He died at Lenton, Nottingham.

== Early career ==
Voce came from a working-class background in the coal mining districts around Nottingham. In the late 1920s he was living in Hucknall, a colliery town. He walked from Hucknall to Trent Bridge in the hope of a trial and his natural talent was quickly recognised. In Voce's Daily Telegraph obituary, the writer E. W. Swanton recalled his "long, loose arm and natural flowing action". Bowling over the wicket, Voce could perform both the inswinger and the outswinger. Depending on the pitch conditions, he could switch from pace to slow-medium spin.

Voce made his first-class debut for Nottinghamshire against Gloucestershire in 1927. A few good performances saw him keep his place despite the strength and variety of Nottinghamshire's bowling. At this stage, he was a classical left-arm spinner and some critics viewed him as a successor to Colin Blythe. Thus, when he changed to a faster pace the following year there was a good deal of criticism, but, in 1929, Voce returned to his slower style with great success in a number of games on sticky wickets, notably against Northamptonshire when he took fourteen wickets for 43 runs.

== International selection ==
He was selected for the English tour of the West Indies and made his Test debut in the first Test at Bridgetown, Barbados, on 11 January 1930. However, the hard wicket encouraged him to move to a faster style, and he had so much success that he persisted with the faster method when he returned to England, except on wet pitches. He did not do particularly well as a pace bowler in 1930, but following Australia's tour of England in that summer, when Don Bradman scored freely against the English bowling, Voce was part of a meeting convened between the future English captain, Douglas Jardine, and Nottinghamshire captain, Arthur Carr, to come up with a tactic to defeat Bradman and the Australians. Voce, and his fellow Nottinghamshire fast bowler, Harold Larwood, agreed to a suggestion by Jardine that bowling fast rising balls into the batsmen's bodies, with several catching fielders on the leg side would be an effective tactic.

Over the next two years, Voce and Larwood practised this modified form of leg theory for Nottinghamshire, causing severe problems for opposing batsmen. Although Voce was somewhat slower than Larwood, his line, from left-arm over the wicket, and the steeper bounce that he obtained from his height, made him formidable enough and the batsmen got no relief when facing him. Voce took 123 wickets for 19.29 each in 1931, and with 136 for 16.87 each in 1932, he was chosen as one of the Wisden Cricketers of the Year for 1933. His bowling was so good that he regained his Test place and, with Larwood, was named for the 1932–1933 English tour of Australia, to be captained by Jardine. The bowlers implemented Jardine's tactic, bowling fast and short at the Australian batsmen, with Voce inflicting several bruising injuries. The Australian media dubbed the tactic 'Bodyline'. This resulted in severe ill-feeling between the cricket teams, and the countries.

== After Bodyline ==
Following the Bodyline series, Voce declined severely as a bowler, but advanced as a hard-hitting batsman, to such an extent that he scored 1,020 runs for an average of over 35 in 1933 – though from Nottinghamshire's perspective, this advance was nothing in comparison to the loss of 140 wickets from Larwood, and a cut of half in Voce's tally. Voce was to remain a dangerous hitter for the rest of his career, and still holds the record for having played in the greatest number – five – of tenth wicket century stands in first-class cricket.

The political fallout resulting from Bodyline ensured that Voce, despite taking eight wickets against the Australians in 1934, was not chosen for any of the Tests, and before the 1935 season started, Voce asked Marylebone Cricket Club (MCC) not to choose him. However, in county cricket, Voce was as good a bowler as ever, and may have taken over 150 wickets in both 1935 and 1936, but for faulty catching in the slips. He declared himself available again during the latter year, and became party to the 1936/1937 tour under Gubby Allen. Bowling this time to an off-side field, Voce, after a disappointing beginning, bowled superbly in the first Test at the Gabba with six for 41 on a perfect pitch, and crushed Australia with four for sixteen, after rain, on the fifth day. England won by 322 runs, and Voce again utilised a rain-affected pitch in the second Test with match figures of seven for 76, including three wickets in four balls. After taking seventeen wickets in the inaugural two Tests, Voce did not keep up his form in the last three due to a back problem. He still finished with 26 wickets to be the leading bowler for the series.

1937, however, was wiped out by a serious injury mid-season, and, even when fit again in the following two years, Voce was troubled by illness and had lost the venom of earlier in the decade. He failed to reach 100 wickets in either season, and joined the armed forces during World War II.

== Post-war career ==
In 1946, at the age of thirty-seven, Voce played little cricket, but one excellent performance in a Test trial led him to be picked for his third tour of Australia for the 1946–47 Ashes series. Having arrived from a country that had had seven years of rationing Australia was a 'land flowing with milk and honey' and he soon put on two stone (28 lbs) in weight. Whilst his classic action remained, he had none of the venom of old, was overweight and medium-paced, and in a controversial umpiring decision Bradman was given not out after being caught for 28 off his bowling in the First Test. Voce failed to take a Test wicket on the tour and played his last Test match against Australia at Melbourne in 1947, soon after which he announced his retirement from cricket to become county coach. However, so weak was Nottinghamshire's bowling attack, that he played five more matches for them, the last as late as 1952.

Voce played in twenty seven Tests, scoring 308 runs at an average of 13.39, and taking 98 wickets at an average of 27.88. Even though he toured Australia three times, he never played for England against Australia in England. Right up to his death in 1984 at the age of 74, Voce was reluctant to discuss the Bodyline series, though it is known that he privately considered Bodyline to be wrong.
