= Morris Sievers =

Australian cricketer

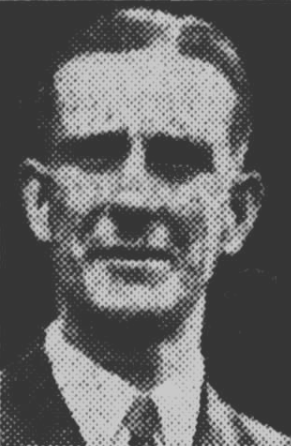
- Sievers pictured in 1941

Personal information
- Born: 13 April 1912; Powlett River, Victoria, Australia
- Died: 10 May 1968 (aged 94); Brunswick, Victoria, Australia
- Batting: Right-handed
- Bowling: Right-arm fast-medium

International information
- National side: Australia (1936–1937)
- Test debut (cap 157): 4 December 1936 v England
- Last Test: 1 January 1937 v England

Career statistics
Competition	Test	First-class
Matches	3	58
Runs scored	67	2,075
Batting average	13.40	29.64
100s/50s	0/0	0/14
Top score	25*	76
Balls bowled	602	10,035
Wickets	9	116
Bowling average	17.88	33.36
5 wickets in innings	1	4
10 wickets in match	0	0
Best bowling	5/21	6/43
Catches/stumpings	4/–	56/–
- Source: Cricinfo, 14 October 2022

Morris William Sievers (13 April 1912 – 10 May 1968) was an Australian cricketer who played in three Test matches in 1936–37.

== First-class career ==
Sievers began his career in 1930 for the Colts, at 17 years of age. Sievers was a useful right-handed lower order batsman and a right-arm fast-medium bowler who played for Victoria in the seasons leading up to the Second World War. He made a lot of useful 50s for the state team, but his bowling was inclined to be expensive.

Sievers toured South Africa in 1935–36 with the Australian cricket team under Vic Richardson but, with the Australian bowling dominated by the spin of Clarrie Grimmett and Bill O'Reilly, he was not called on for any of the Tests and took only seven first-class wickets on the tour.

== Test career ==
Sievers' Test match experience came in the first three matches of the MCC tour under Gubby Allen in 1936–37. Curiously fragile batting by the Australians gave England commanding victories in both the first two matches, at Brisbane and at Sydney, and Sievers distinguished himself with neither ball nor bat.

The third Test at Melbourne, however, saw a complete reversal of fortune, largely through the intervention of the weather. After Australia had struggled on the first day on a lifeless pitch, rain set in, so that when Donald Bradman declared at 200 for nine wickets and sent England in to bat, the pitch was of uncertain bounce, if any, and Sievers profited. When England declared having made just 76 for nine wickets, Sievers had taken five for 21, the best figures of the innings. Bradman then juggled his batting order to send expendable tail-enders in first and hit 270 himself on a by-now benevolent pitch. Australia won the match by 365 runs and went on to win the other two matches of the series to retain The Ashes.

Sievers, though, was dropped from the English tour after his Melbourne effort and despite finishing at the top of the Australian bowling averages for the series, he never played Test cricket again.

Sievers continued playing cricket until 1946, ending his career with an average just over 16 for his 270 First XI wickets.

At the age of 56, he died from a heart attack in a hospital in Melbourne.
