= Peter Packham =

Lieutenant-Colonel Peter Frederick Packham (born 1941) is a retired British army officer who also served as Secretary of Middlesex County Cricket Club.

He retired from the British army in 1985 and succeeded Tim Lamb as Secretary of Middlesex County Cricket Club in March 1988. During his tenure of office, Middlesex won the NatWest Trophy at Lord's. He resigned in April 1989 and was replaced permanently by Joe Hardstaff in July 1989.

Sporting positions
Preceded by Tim Lamb	Middlesex CCC Secretary; 1988–1989	Succeeded by Joe Hardstaff
