= Richard Goatley =

English cricket administrator

Personal information
- Full name: Richard John Goatley
- Born: 10 June 1974 (age 52)

Richard John Goatley (born 10 June 1974) is an English cricket administrator and chartered accountant.

== Background ==
Goatley was educated at St Columba's College, St Albans (1985–1992) and King's College London (1992–1995) where he gained a Bachelor of Laws degree (LLB).

== Business career ==
He worked for KPMG UK in London (1995–1999) and JHP Ltd in Tring (1999–2001) where he rose to Finance Director. He joined G7 Business Solutions Ltd at St Albans as Finance Director (2001–2005).

== Middlesex Cricket ==
Goatley became Assistant Secretary and Head of Finance of Middlesex County Cricket Club in March 2005 before subsequent promotions to Finance Director in March 2008, Chief Operating Officer in July 2015 and Chief Executive on 12 October 2015.

His tenure as chief executive saw Middlesex win the County Championship in 2016.

He announced his resignation as Middlesex Chief Executive on 2 July 2021. In a statement the club said: "During his time with us, Richard brought drive and focus."

Middlesex CCC members described him as, "a man of integrity, foresight and genuine concern for others. He was always very accessible, very candid and without doubt a man of compassion."

== Personal life ==
He is married to Lucy and has three children.

Sporting positions
Preceded by Vinny Codrington	Middlesex CCC; Chief Executive; 2015-2021	Succeeded by Andrew Cornish
Preceded by Vinny Codrington	Middlesex CCC Secretary; 2015-2021	Succeeded by Andrew Cornish
