= Joe Hardstaff Jr =

English cricketer

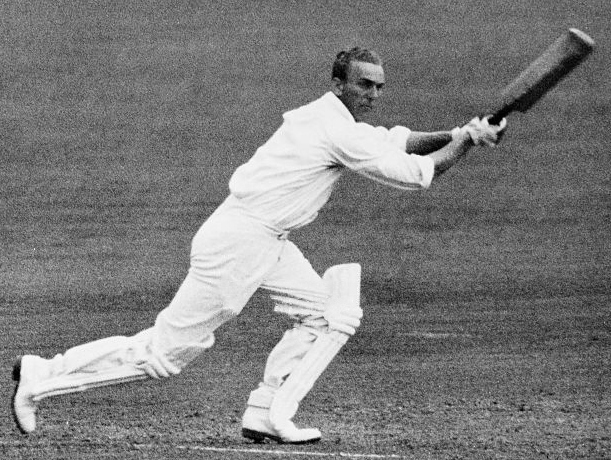
- Hardstaff in 1936

Personal information
- Full name: Joseph Hardstaff
- Born: 3 July 1911; Nuncargate, Nottinghamshire, England
- Died: 1 January 1990 (aged 78); Worksop, Nottinghamshire, England
- Batting: Right-handed
- Bowling: Right-arm medium
- Relatives: Joe Hardstaff Sr (father); Joe Hardstaff (son)

International information
- National side: England
- Test debut: 13 July 1935 v South Africa
- Last Test: 10 June 1948 v Australia

Career statistics
Competition	Test	First-class
Matches	23	517
Runs scored	1,636	31,847
Batting average	46.74	44.35
100s/50s	4/10	83/166
Top score	205*	266
Balls bowled	–	3,890
Wickets	–	36
Bowling average	–	59.47
5 wickets in innings	–	0
10 wickets in match	–	0
Best bowling	–	4/43
Catches/stumpings	9/–	123/–
- Source: ESPNcricinfo, 5 August 2020

Joseph Hardstaff Jr (3 July 1911 – 1 January 1990) was an English cricketer, who played in twenty three Test matches for England from 1935 to 1948. Hardstaff's father, Joe senior played for Nottinghamshire and England and his son, also named Joe, played first-class cricket as well.

Cricket correspondent Colin Bateman remarked, "Hardstaff was one of the most artistic batsmen ever to set foot on a cricket field but he paid the high price of falling out with Gubby Allen".

== Life and career ==
Hardstaff was born in Nuncargate, Kirkby-in-Ashfield, Nottinghamshire.

One of the most elegant middle order batsman of the 1930s, a rich era for English batsmanship, Hardstaff first played for Nottinghamshire at the age of nineteen, and made his name with 1,817 runs in 1934, which led to his Test selection against South Africa the following year. He had a highly successful tour of Australia under Errol Holmes in 1935–36, scoring over a thousand runs in tour matches in his upright, elegant style, but proved less prolific in the Tests when he returned in 1936–37. The experience spurred him to further buttress his defensive technique and this, allied with his natural stroke play, led to a fine season at home in 1937, when he posted over 2,500 runs including three double hundreds. He won the Walter Lawrence trophy for the fastest century of the season, in scoring an unbeaten 117 in under an hour, to help defeat Kent in a frenetic run chase and was duly named one of Wisden Cricketers of the Year in 1938. His form did not desert him in the Test matches, he scored 350 runs at 70 against New Zealand, and, after being overlooked for the first two tests in 1938, he stroked 169 at The Oval while Len Hutton broke the world record score. He was surprisingly omitted from the 1938/9 tour to South Africa, but averaged 50 in 1939 and played against the West Indies in the last Test series before World War II.

The war robbed him, like so many others, of perhaps his best cricketing years, and his Test appearances were sporadic when cricket resumed, despite a brilliant unbeaten double century against India in 1946. He was chosen for the tour of Australia in 1946–47, but suffered an injury and played in only one Test, scoring 67 in the first innings.

In 1947–48 Hardstaff toured the West Indies under Gubby Allen's captaincy, but a clash of personalities meant they did not see eye to eye. On their return, Allen assured Hardstaff that he would never play another Test. Hardstaff asked Allen to name his odds and Allen proffered 100–1, which Hardstaff backed with a five pound note. Hardstaff nevertheless played in the First Test that summer against Australia, and duly received a cheque for £500, which he tore up and posted back to Allen. Hardstaff did not play for England again.

He remained a colossus on the county circuit, stroking 2,396 runs at 64.75 in 1947, but retired with just twenty three tests to his name, having scored 1,636 at an average of 46.74. He headed the national averages in 1949 with 2,251 runs at 72.61. The press clamoured for his reinstatement in the national side, but Allen's influence held sway. On Hardstaff's retirement in 1955, he had almost 32,000 runs under his belt at 44.35, one of the highest scoring Nottinghamshire batsman in history, with a century against every county except his own. He recorded eighty three centuries, with ten double hundreds, and passed a thousand runs in a season thirteen times. In addition to three MCC tours to Australia, and one to the West Indies, he also played two seasons of first-class cricket in New Zealand after the war. He was also a fine, athletic outfielder, and took 36 wickets with his eccentric medium pace. (The highest scoring Nottinghamshire batsman was George Gunn who scored 35,208 runs.)

Hardstaff's son, who later became the secretary of Middlesex, also confusingly was the third Joe Hardstaff to appear in first-class cricket, when he played for the Free Foresters in the early 1960s.

Hardstaff died in Worksop, Nottinghamshire, on the first day of 1990, aged 78.
