= Annesley Woodhouse =

Village in Nottinghamshire, England

Coordinates: 53.076°N 1.258°W

- Village
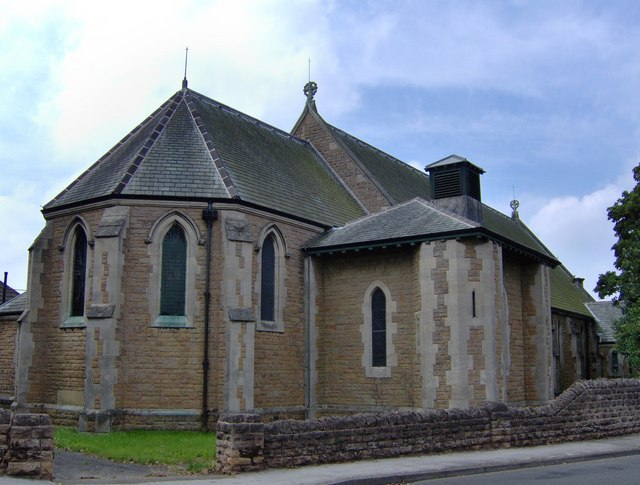
- St John's Church

- Location within Nottinghamshire
- OS grid reference: SK4953
- District: Ashfield
- Shire county: Nottinghamshire
- Region: East Midlands
- Country: England
- Sovereign state: United Kingdom
- Post town: Nottingham
- Postcode district: NG17
- Dialling code: 01623
- Police: Nottinghamshire
- Fire: Nottinghamshire
- Ambulance: East Midlands
- UK Parliament: Ashfield

Annesley Woodhouse is a village in Nottinghamshire, England, located approximately 10 mi (16 km) north of the City of Nottingham and 6 mi (9.6 km) south of Mansfield, close to Junction 27 of the M1 motorway. It has a current population of around 3,500, the data from the 2011 census being included in the civil parish of Annesley.

== History ==
Annesley Woodhouse originated as a farming community and expanded in the 19th and 20th centuries as the mining industry locally was established and grew. In the post-war years and beyond, the village has grown rapidly and conjoined with neighbouring villages Nuncargate & Kirkby Woodhouse. All have now become an extension of their 'parent' town, Kirkby-in-Ashfield.

== Modern Annesley Woodhouse ==
With the demise of the mining industry in the 1990s Annesley Woodhouse is now largely a residential area with people travelling out of the village for education, employment and leisure.

A windmill was located near to Midfield Road (grid reference SK507542).

=== Murder of Keith Frogson ===
On 19 July, 2004, Keith "Froggy" Frogson, a 66 year old retired miner, and outspoken member of the National Union of Mineworkers, was murdered on his doorstep by Robert Boyer. Although initial reports linked the death to the 1984–1985 United Kingdom miners' strike, due to Boyer choosing to continue working, mental illness was later declared. The murder resulted in a manhunt in which Boyer was found living in a tent in the nearby woodland. He pleaded guilty to manslaughter, and was given an indefinite hospital order.

The events inspired the 2022 BBC drama series Sherwood.
