= Joe Hardstaff Sr =

English cricketer

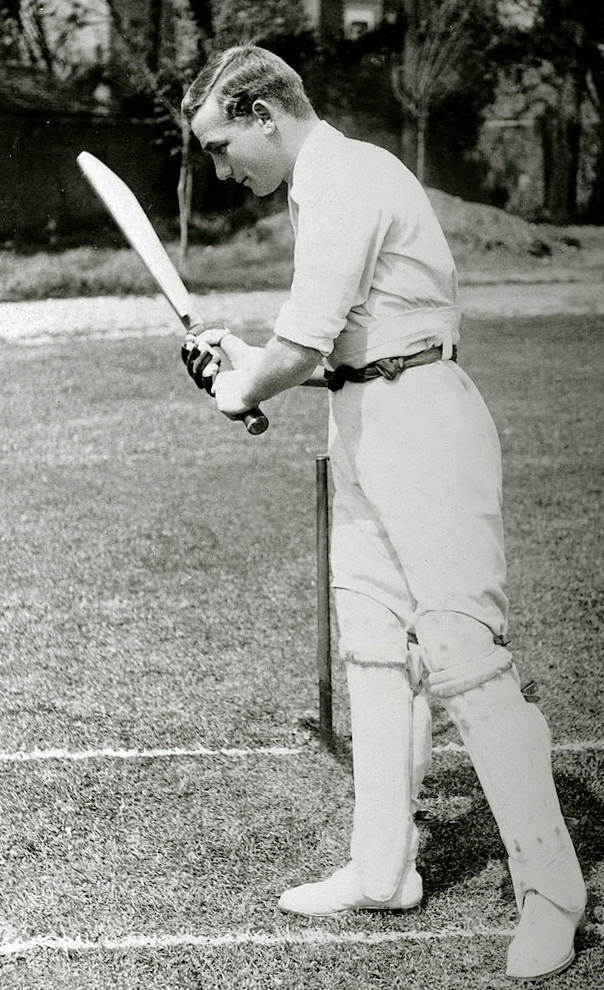

Personal information
- Full name: Joseph Hardstaff
- Batting: Right-handed
- Bowling: Right-arm fast-medium

International information
- National side: England
- Test debut (cap 154): 13 December 1907 v Australia
- Last Test: 27 February 1908 v Australia

Career statistics
Competition	Test	First-class
Matches	5	377
Runs scored	311	17,146
Batting average	31.10	31.34
100s/50s	0/3	26/94
Top score	72	213*
Balls bowled	–	3,594
Wickets	–	59
Bowling average	–	38.68
5 wickets in innings	–	1
10 wickets in match	–	0
Best bowling	–	5/133
Catches/stumpings	1/–	187/2
- Source: CricInfo, 30 December 2021

Joseph Hardstaff (9 November 1882 – 2 April 1947) was an English first-class cricketer who played for Nottinghamshire and England. He was born in Kirkby-in-Ashfield, Nottinghamshire. With the rise to cricket prominence of his son, also called Joseph (Joe), he is generally referred to as "Joe Hardstaff senior" or "Joe Hardstaff Sr".

Hardstaff made his debut during 1902, playing one match against Lancashire scoring 2. He was a central figure in the Notts side until he retired at the end of the 1924 season. He was primarily a middle-order batsman, though he occasionally bowled medium, especially after the war. Having helped his county to its first County Championship in 1907, he was picked for the tour to Australia in 1907/08, captained by the Nottinghamshire county captain Arthur Jones. Hardstaff was a big success on the tour, scoring more runs in first-class matches than any other batsman, and coming third, behind George Gunn and Jack Hobbs, in the Test matches. His subsequent form precluded further selection for although he passed 1000 runs seven times in England, and once on his sole overseas tour. Apart from 1911, he rarely featured amongst the leading batsmen in the averages. He was selected, surprisingly, in 1910, for the Players against the Gentlemen at Lords. He appeared three times in this fixture at the Oval.

He was on the MCC staff during the early part of his career and after he retired.

After retirement, he played occasional matches for MCC and became a first-class umpire, standing in 21 Test matches. His appearances at International level were limited because of the inclusion of his son Joe Hardstaff Jr in the England team from the mid-1930s.
