= Gubby Allen =

English cricketer

Sir George Allen CBE
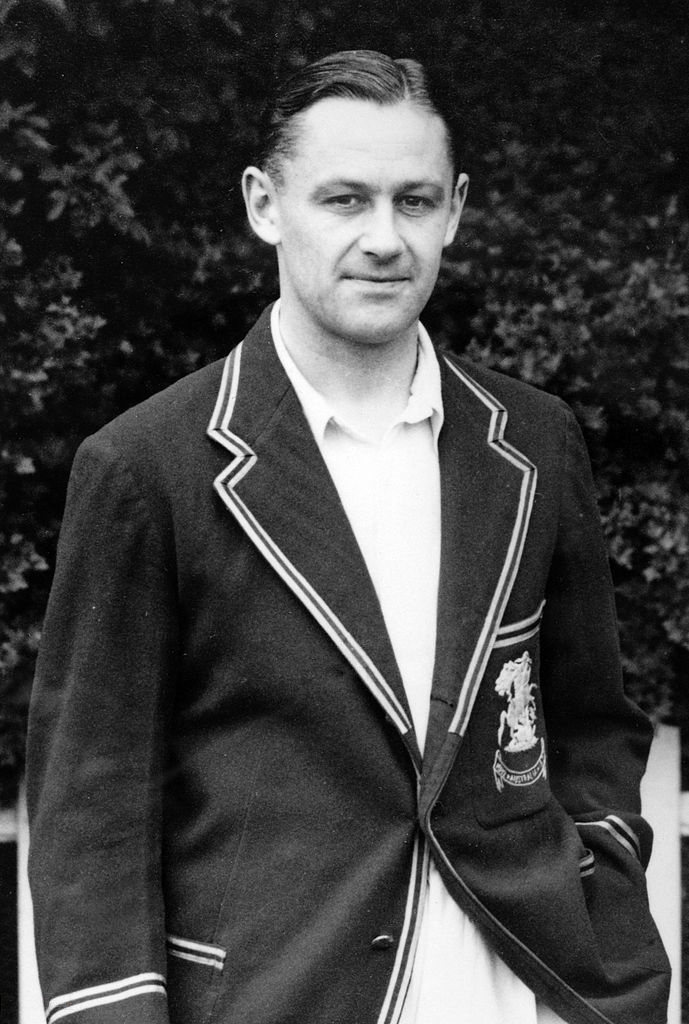
- Allen, photographed c. 1933

Personal information
- Full name: George Oswald Browning Allen
- Born: 31 July 1902; Bellevue Hill, New South Wales, Australia
- Died: 29 November 1989 (aged 87); St John's Wood, London, England
- Nickname: Gubby
- Height: 189 cm (6 ft 2 in)
- Batting: Right-handed
- Bowling: Right-arm fast
- Role: All-rounder

International information
- National side: England
- Test debut: 27 June 1930 v Australia
- Last Test: 1 April 1948 v West Indies

Domestic team information
- Years: Team
- 1921–1950: Middlesex
- 1922–1923: Cambridge University
- 1923–1953: Marylebone Cricket Club (MCC)

Career statistics
| Competition | Test | First-class |
|---|---|---|
| Matches | 25 | 265 |
| Runs scored | 750 | 9,233 |
| Batting average | 24.19 | 28.67 |
| 100s/50s | 1/3 | 11/47 |
| Top score | 122 | 180 |
| Balls bowled | 4,386 | 36,189 |
| Wickets | 81 | 788 |
| Bowling average | 29.37 | 22.23 |
| 5 wickets in innings | 5 | 48 |
| 10 wickets in match | 1 | 9 |
| Best bowling | 7/80 | 10/40 |
| Catches/stumpings | 20/– | 131/– |
- Source: CricketArchive, 28 March 2008

Sir George Oswald Browning "Gubby" Allen (Note: Allen was generally known as G. O. Allen as a cricketer, and his third name was not used consistently. While at Eton, his initials of G. O. B. Allen gave rise to the nickname "Gobby", which in time became "Gubby". His family knew him as "Obie", but very few of even his close friends and family ever called him "George".) CBE (31 July 1902 – 29 November 1989) was a cricketer who captained England in eleven Test matches. In first-class matches, he played for Middlesex and Cambridge University. A fast bowler and hard-hitting lower-order batsman, Allen later became an influential cricket administrator who held key positions in the Marylebone Cricket Club (MCC), which effectively ruled English cricket at the time; he also served as chairman of the England selectors.

Allen was born in Australia and grew up in England from the age of six. After playing cricket for Eton College, he went to Cambridge University where he established a reputation as a fast bowler, albeit one who was often injured. After leaving university, Allen played mainly for Middlesex. He improved as a batsman in the following seasons until work commitments forced him to play less regularly. A change of career allowed him to play more cricket, and by the late 1920s he was on the verge of the England Test team. He made his debut in 1930, and remained in contention for a place, when he was available to play, for the rest of the decade. During the controversial Bodyline tour of 1932–33, Allen was very successful for England but refused to use the intimidatory tactics employed by his teammates.

From 1933, Allen worked in the London Stock Exchange, which limited the amount of cricket he could play. Even so, he was appointed England captain in 1936 and led the team during the 1936–37 tour of Australia, when the home team won 3–2 having lost the first two matches. He continued to play irregularly for Middlesex until 1939; after the Second World War, in which he worked in military intelligence, he played occasionally for Middlesex and other teams into the 1950s. He captained England in a final Test series in the West Indies in 1947–48. As a cricketer, Allen was affected by his lack of regular play and was at his most effective during his two tours of Australia when he was able to build up his form. At other times, his bowling was often erratic but occasionally devastating. An orthodox batsman, he often scored runs when his team were under pressure.

As Allen's first-class career came to a close, he moved into administration and held considerable influence in English and world cricket. He was instrumental in the creation of a MCC coaching manual, and worked hard to eliminate illegal bowling actions. As chairman of selectors from 1955 to 1961, he presided over a period of great success for English cricket, during which he worked closely with the Test captain Peter May. In 1963, he became MCC president, and was made the club's treasurer the following year. In this role, he was deeply involved in the D'Oliveira affair, a controversy over the potential selection of Basil D'Oliveira to tour South Africa. After Allen's gradual retirement from his administrative roles, he was knighted in 1986 and spent his later years in a flat close to Lord's, where he died, aged 87, in 1989.

== Early life ==
Allen was born on 31 July 1902 in Bellevue Hill, Sydney, Australia, (Note: Allen's family had lived in Australia since his great-great-grandparents moved from England in 1816, and his paternal uncle, Reginald Allen, played cricket for Australia.) the second of three children to Walter Allen, a lawyer, and his wife Marguerite (Pearl), née Lamb, the daughter of Edward Lamb, a Queensland government minister. Later rumours suggested that Allen's real father may have been the Middlesex cricketer Pelham Warner, who supported Allen in his cricket career. (Note: Allen's team-mate Bob Wyatt recalled rumours in the 1930s that Warner was Allen's real father, and the cricket historian David Frith suggests that similar stories circulated in the 1980s, but only circumstantial evidence supports these rumours. Frith suggests that they may have been spread maliciously by enemies of Allen, but points out that Warner favoured Allen several times during his career, which he followed closely. Frith believes that Allen looked more like Warner than Walter Allen; he states that Warner was an admirer of Pearl Allen in the early 1900s, and was briefly in Australia at roughly the right period. According to Frith, the biography of Warner by Gerald Howat relates that Warner's wife was jealous of Pearl, and suggests that Warner regarded Allen as a "member of the family". Howat also calls Allen a "favoured son" of Warner.) Both of Allen's parents had roots in England as well as Australia. In 1909, when Allen was six years old, his family moved to London—hoping that the children would benefit from an English education—where they initially lived in a flat before moving to various country villages. Finding that they enjoyed England, the family abandoned plans to return to Australia.

After being educated by a governess, Allen joined Summer Fields School in Oxford in 1912. He began to play cricket seriously at school; by his second year, he reached the school second team, from where he progressed to the first team then the captaincy. His ability attracted the attention of Eton College, where a friend of Allen's father, C. M. Wells, was a housemaster. The family had planned to send Allen to Haileybury, but Wells persuaded Allen senior to send his son to Eton instead, although it was a considerable financial burden on the family. Allen, although not initially keen on the prospect, started there in the winter of 1915–16.

At Eton, Allen played many sports, but his academic performance was no more than respectable, and he later admitted to laziness. In cricket, Allen played for his school house team and had reasonable success with bat and ball; by 1918 he was house cricket captain. After a trial match, and a spell in the school second team, he progressed to the Eton first team in 1919. The effects of a rib injury limited his bowling, and he achieved little with the bat. Even so, he was chosen to play in the prestigious match against Harrow School, played annually at Lord's in London. In his second innings, he scored 69 runs, the highest individual score of the game, and Eton won the match. His rib injury continued to trouble him in 1920, and caused him such pain that he considered abandoning bowling altogether. The new Eton coach George Hirst persuaded him to continue, and a few weeks later Allen took nine for 19 (nine wickets while conceding 19 runs) in an innings against Winchester. But other than this performance, Allen was ineffective. More successful in 1921, he opened the batting for a time; he also opened the bowling, topping the Eton bowling averages. He had some success at Lord's against Harrow and a particularly fast bowling spell in this match was seen by Hubert Ashton, who was to captain the Cambridge University team the following year—Allen had already been approved for a place at Trinity College, Cambridge beginning later that year. He was chosen to play in the annual matches at Lord's in which two teams representing the best public schoolboys opposed each other, but was forced to withdraw with sunstroke.

Towards the end of the 1921 season, Allen was invited to play first-class cricket as an amateur for Middlesex, for whom he qualified by residence. (Note: At the time, it was not unusual for schoolboys to play county cricket; several Eton pupils played during the 1921 season.) Allen believed that Pelham Warner, who often supported young Middlesex cricketers, encouraged his selection by the club, despite the potential risks to the team's position in the County Championship from playing an inexperienced cricketer. Allen made his first-class debut against Somerset on 21 August 1921 and made one other appearance that season without achieving much in either match.

== First-class cricketer ==
=== Cambridge University ===
Allen played for Cambridge in 1922. He was left out of the team's first game; as the university was playing Middlesex, he played for the opposition instead and took six for 13. Around this time, he began to bowl fast for the first time. After success in the following games—including ten wickets in the game against Sussex—Allen was awarded his blue by being selected for the University Match against Oxford at Lord's. In that game, he had match figures of nine for 78 in a comfortable Cambridge victory. This was Cambridge's last game of the season—Allen had taken 49 first-class wickets at an average of 15. There were suggestions in the press at the time that Allen illegally threw, rather than bowled, the ball. In his biography of Allen, E. W. Swanton writes that these rumours were neither widespread nor repeated later in Allen's career, and that they may have resulted from a one-off lapse. Towards the end of the season, Allen returned to the Middlesex team and his 15 wickets placed him at the top of the county's bowling averages.

Allen played rugby for the Trinity team before resuming cricket for the 1923 season. He began well, reaching fifty in a first-class match for the first time against Middlesex, in which he shared a stand of 120 for the ninth wicket with Ralph Huband, and taking six for 89 in the same game. Further bowling success followed but before the University Match, he once more injured his rib muscles. Persuaded to play anyway, Allen could only bowl short spells which lacked incisiveness and Cambridge lost heavily. Several critics, including some teammates, believed he did not try. During the match, Allen consulted a specialist over his frequent rib injuries; the specialist's treatment and a period of rest cured the problem for the remainder of his career. Allen's Cambridge season was further marred by differences with his captain, Claude Ashton, over team selections and tactics. The 1923 University Match was his final game for Cambridge as Trinity, unhappy with his lack of academic work, rusticated him in the summer. (Note: Had the cricket team elected Allen as their captain for the following season, another Cambridge college would have taken him, but he was passed over for the position. He had been appointed the cricket team's secretary after the 1922 season, a position which was often a stepping-stone to the captaincy. Before the election for 1924, Allen had discussed the position with Ashton, who was to nominate his successor before voting; Ashton misunderstood Allen's comments, told the meeting that Allen was "happy not to be appointed", and nominated Tom Lowry, who was subsequently elected.)

Later in the 1923 season, Allen was recalled by Middlesex and played five games for the county. At the end of the season, he was chosen in two Scarborough Festival games; one of these was the prestigious Gentlemen v Players match, in which he appeared for the amateur "Gentlemen". This was the first of Allen's 11 appearances for the Gentlemen in this fixture between 1923 and 1938. In the whole season, he took 66 wickets at 19.50 and scored 528 runs at an average of 24.00.

=== Middlesex ===
In late 1923, having decided not to return to Cambridge, Allen took a job in the City (London's financial district) working for the Royal Exchange Assurance Corporation as an underwriter. Not particularly well-off financially, he had to work full-time and throughout his career could not afford to take too much time away from business. He played cricket as often as he could in the summer; when unable to play for Middlesex, he played weekend club cricket—including for the Marylebone Cricket Club (MCC)—and country house cricket.

Allen was free to play regularly for Middlesex in 1924. The team was involved in a close race for the County Championship with Yorkshire, and Allen had several successful matches. He ended the season with 568 runs at 21.84 and 50 wickets at 17.48. Playing less often in 1925, he scored 392 runs, took 39 wickets, and scored his maiden first-class century in the Gentlemen v Players match at the Oval. He was also chosen for the first time to represent the Gentlemen against the Players at Lord's, where he scored 52, and his reputation grew steadily. By the beginning of the 1926 season, he and fellow fast bowler Harold Larwood were tipped in the press to be chosen for the England team against Australia that summer. Allen began well for Middlesex but was less successful in a trial match to help choose the England team. Larwood was chosen for the Test series; Allen was not. In county cricket, Allen scored his first century for Middlesex, and began to open the bowling occasionally, having been the third or fourth bowler in previous seasons. Overall, he scored 771 runs, the highest seasonal aggregate of his career, at an average of 29.65 and took 44 wickets at 28.27.

During the northern winter of 1926–27, Allen toured Argentina to play first-class cricket with an MCC team. When he returned to England, he played eight matches before the end of June, including a game for the MCC against the touring New Zealand team in which he scored a century and took ten wickets. In total, he scored 482 runs at an average of 43.81 and took 19 wickets; this was his last regular cricket until 1929. He declined an invitation to tour South Africa with an MCC team, and work limited him to two first-class games for Middlesex in 1928.

Through Vivian Hugh Smith, the father of some old school-mates, Allen had the opportunity to work in France. He moved to Lyons for 18 months to work for a silk company. During his time there, Allen became aware that the firm's finances were unsound; he warned Hugh Smith, who after some enquiries, withdrew from the business, along with his fellow investor Sir Frederick Richmond. The latter subsequently offered Allen work at Debenhams, of which he was chairman. Allen worked at Debenhams until 1933, initially as first assistant to the Works Department manager, then as the assistant to the assistant general manager.

While at Debenhams, Allen was allowed leave to play cricket. During his first appearance of the 1929 season he performed well but suffered a strain in his next game, which reinforced an impression in the press—articulated by Pelham Warner among others—that he was injury-prone and inclined to hypochondria. His next appearance came a fortnight later, at Lord's against Lancashire; that team had won the County Championship every year since 1926. Owing to work commitments, Allen arrived by prior agreement around 20 minutes after play started. He took the first three wickets, but Lancashire were batting comfortably at 215 for three wickets. Around the tea interval, Allen took the last seven wickets in 69 deliveries while conceding 13 runs from his bowling, including the last four wickets in five balls. In total, he took all ten wickets at a cost of 40 runs, to become only the second man to take all ten wickets in a first-class match at Lord's since 1874, and the last to date. He was praised in the press, although the Manchester Guardian correspondent suggested that a weak batting performance helped him, and Wisden merely described this as one of several good performances in the game. Despite his success, the England selectors preferred Larwood in the Test team against South Africa; even when Larwood was injured, Allen was passed over. Swanton suggests that Allen's bowling was inconsistent throughout the season; he finished with 31 wickets at 25.87 and scored 544 at 45.33.

== Test match career ==
=== Debut ===
During 1930, Allen again had leave in which he could play cricket, and was among the front-runners for a place in the England team. His first appearance of the season was for the MCC against the Australian touring team. Although he took four for 28 on the last day, his rivals for an England place were also successful. Playing for Middlesex against the Australians, Allen took six for 77 but was overlooked for the first Test at Trent Bridge, Nottingham. England won the match during the course of which Larwood, the incumbent fast bowler in the team, fell ill. Allen opted to play for Middlesex against Northamptonshire while the team for the second Test was being chosen, and took six for 77. His subsequent inclusion in the squad of 13 for that game was not particularly well received by the press.

On the morning of the match, Larwood was unfit and Allen played. England batted first, and Allen scored three runs before being dismissed on the first afternoon. On the second morning, an article in the Daily Express by Trevor Wignall, a popular journalist who wrote sensational sports stories, suggested that the crowd's enjoyment of the day was marred by Allen's inclusion on the grounds of his Australian birth. Wignall claimed that the public felt Allen should have been omitted, and that the selectors were rumoured to be ignorant of his birthplace. That day, Allen opened the bowling for England; after a slow start, the Australian openers added 162 runs before the first wicket fell. Like the other bowlers, Allen then rapidly conceded runs to Donald Bradman, who scored 254 runs. Australia scored 729 for six declared in reply to England's 425, and Allen returned bowling figures of none for 115 from 34 overs. England lost early wickets in their second innings, and when Allen came in to bat, the score was 147 for five wickets, still 167 behind the Australians. He scored 57 and shared a partnership of 125 with his captain, Percy Chapman, to take England into the lead but Australia won the match by seven wickets. In contrast to the reaction to his bowling, Allen's innings was praised in the press. This was his only Test of the series.

Allen was unsuccessful in the Gentlemen v Players game, but performed effectively with the ball for Middlesex. He continued to struggle when batting, and his highest innings of the year was 77 runs scored in the end-of-season Scarborough Festival. In total, he scored 281 runs at 17.56 and took 42 wickets at 22.19. He was not invited on the MCC tour of South Africa.

=== Success ===
Allen's cricket remained limited in 1931. Despite all-round success in several early games for Middlesex, he was initially omitted from the team for the first Test against the New Zealand team. (Note: New Zealand were scheduled to play only one Test in 1931. After their strong performance in that match, a further two Tests were added to their programme.) When Larwood withdrew with an ankle injury, Allen was added to the team; according to Anthony Meredith, writing in The Cricketer in 2002, Pelham Warner made this decision himself without consulting his fellow selectors, to their considerable annoyance. Allen did not have a particularly good match as a bowler, but was successful with the bat. When he started his innings at the beginning of the second day, England had scored 190 for seven wickets in reply to New Zealand's 224. He scored 98 in the 150-minute first session, and went on to score 122; with Les Ames, he added 246 for the eighth wicket. This was a record partnership in Test matches for the eighth wicket until 1996, and an England record for that wicket until 2010. England scored 454, but New Zealand replied with 469 and the match was drawn on the third and final day. This was Allen's only innings of the series.

After a gap of three weeks with no cricket, Allen took six wickets in his first match back. Meanwhile, Larwood was ruled out of the England team after an injury in a car crash; Allen played in the second Test and took five for 14 in New Zealand's first innings. England won that game, and the next was drawn after rain washed out the first two days; Allen neither batted nor bowled. In the series, he took eight wickets at an average of 16.12. He ended the season with 401 first-class runs at 30.84 and 40 wickets at 18.77.

Allen played less frequently in 1932, even though he wanted to secure a place in the MCC team to tour Australia during the 1932–33 season. (Note: Throughout Allen's career, the MCC organised and administered English cricket. Official English touring teams always played under the name of MCC and were only styled "England" during Test matches.) He played four times for Middlesex and played in two Test trial games, but did not play in the season's only Test match. His most important game of the season was the Gentlemen v Players match, in which many of those involved were potential selections for the touring team; he took eight wickets in the game, and after the second trial was named in the MCC team. The press reaction to his inclusion was mixed, and there were several who criticised the selectors. He was low in the national batting and bowling averages; critics pointed out his infrequent appearances in first-class cricket and questioned his stamina for a long tour. Having been named in the team, Allen did not play again in the season. In eight first-class matches, he scored 113 runs at 11.30 and took 25 wickets at 25.36.

=== Bodyline series ===
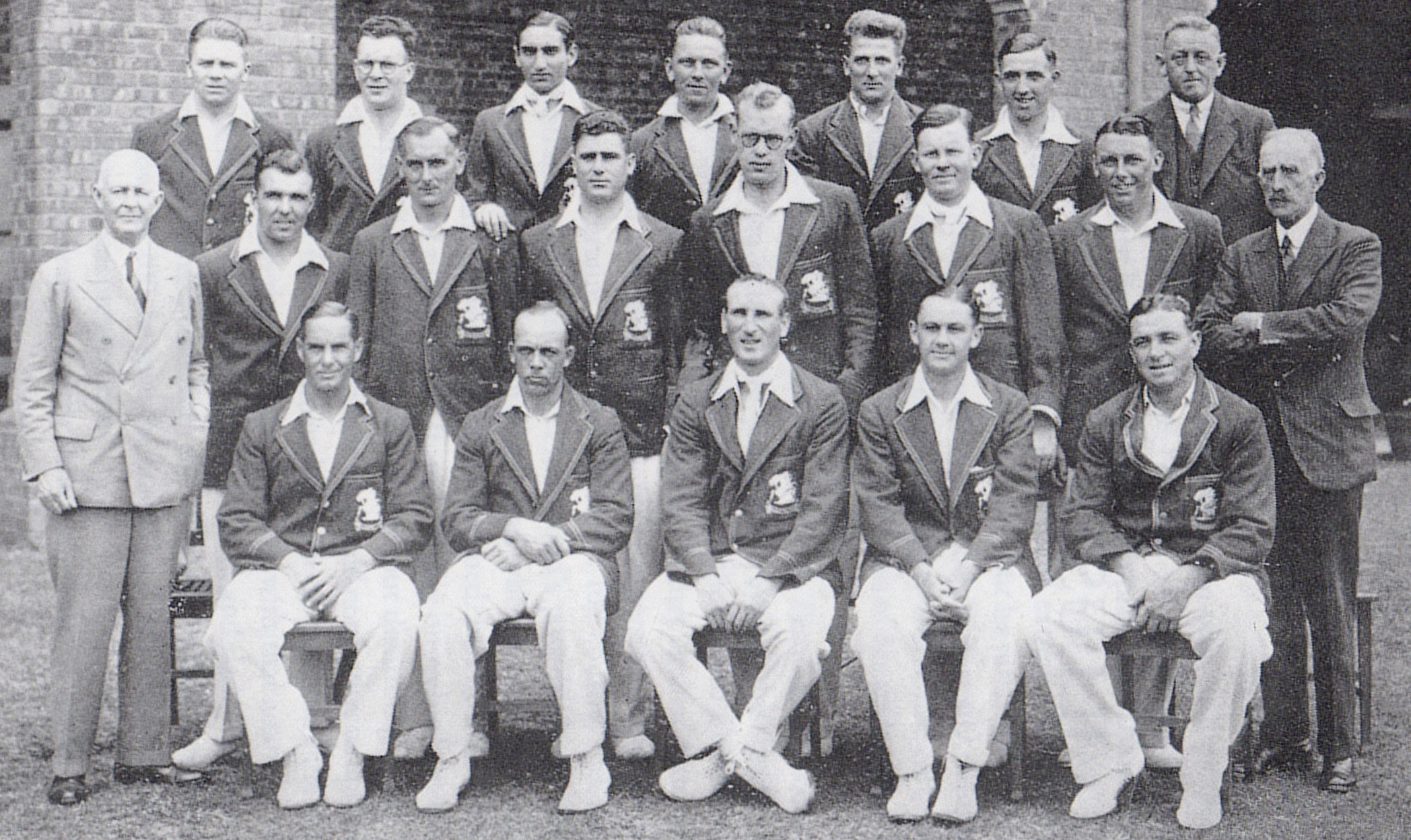
A team photograph of England's 1932–33 side: Allen is seated second from the right on the front row. Douglas Jardine is in the centre of the front row and Pelham Warner is on the extreme left.

The MCC tour of Australia during the 1932–33 season was highly controversial owing to the England team's use of what came to be known as Bodyline bowling. The tactic involved bowling at leg stump or just outside it, pitching the ball short so that it reared at the batsman's body and with a ring of fielders ranged on the leg side to catch any defensive deflections from the bat. Bodyline bowling was intimidatory, and was largely designed and implemented by Douglas Jardine, the MCC captain, in an attempt to curb the prolific scoring of Bradman. Allen was one of four fast bowlers chosen for the tour, but did not go along with Jardine's instructions to "hate" the opposition. Nevertheless, the two men got along, and Allen later claimed to be Jardine's "best friend" on the tour. Allen also wrote home that Jardine was "the stupidest man I know", claimed to be terrified of him and suggested that at times he felt like killing him.

Jardine did not initially plan to include Allen in the Test team, but the latter's bowling in the opening tour matches brought him into the frame. In his first game, he unsettled and dismissed Bradman with his pace; in later years Jack Hobbs, who reported on the game, suggested that Bradman was intimidated by Allen, and Jack Fingleton, who played in the team with Bradman, claimed that he refused to face Allen's bowling. Allen later wrote to his father that Bradman was a "terrible little coward of fast bowling"; the two men later became friends, and Bradman was never made aware of what Allen wrote.

Allen played in England's victory in the first Test but took only one wicket. He retained his place as part of a four-man pace attack in the second Test, took four wickets and was one of the most successful English batsmen in the match. Australia levelled the series after Bradman scored a century, but England won the remaining three matches of the series. In the third game, Allen opened the bowling and took four wickets in each innings. His performance was praised by critics and enhanced his reputation. As Voce missed the fourth Test with injury, Allen bowled more in that game and took five wickets, but suffered a side-strain in the second innings. The injury prevented Allen bowling at full pace in the final Test; he played despite his own reservations and struggled throughout. In total, Allen took 21 Test wickets at an average of 28.23 and scored 163 runs at 23.28. In his review of the tour for Wisden, Sydney Southerton wrote: "G. O. Allen, about whose selection many hard things were at the time said, fully justified his choice ... He accomplished great work, often getting rid of batsmen likely to be dangerous; his fielding close in on the leg side was uniformly good and he played several excellent innings. Altogether a most useful man in the team." Jardine praised his contribution after the tour, both to Allen's family and in his official report. In all first-class matches, Allen scored 397 runs at 24.81 and took 39 wickets at 23.05. In his biography of Jardine, Christopher Douglas suggests: "[Allen] thrived on the intensive programme of matches and was able to build up his form and consistency to a standard that he hardly ever matched in England."

Throughout the series, Allen refused to use Bodyline tactics, (Note: Allen's definition of Bodyline was different from that of other people. He maintained that England did not use Bodyline until the second innings of the second Test, when Larwood began to bowl outside leg stump. He maintained that the bowling in the first Test was acceptable and not Bodyline. Speaking to David Frith, he denied that Bodyline was used in the first match, and when challenged, replied: "My dear chap, I was there." Frith also reports that on the first day of the second Test, Allen had up to five fielders on the leg side, and one of his deliveries struck the Australian captain Bill Woodfull on the chest.) and openly said so within the team. His attitude made him popular with Australian spectators. Jardine twice tried to force the issue. Before the first Test, he asked Allen to bowl more bouncers with fielders on the leg side; Allen refused, saying he did not want to play cricket like that and that Jardine should leave him out if he was not happy. Prior to the second Test, Jardine again approached Allen and said that Larwood and Voce wanted him to bowl short, and believed that he only refused because he wanted to maintain his popularity. Allen wrote home: "Well, I burst and said a good deal about swollen-headed, gutless, uneducated miners." Allen threatened not to play, and to go home to relate the events of the tour to the press. Jardine did not pursue the matter. Others in the team also opposed Bodyline. The Nawab of Pataudi refused to field in the "leg trap"—the ring of fielders positioned on the leg side to catch deflections from short deliveries—during the first Test. (Note: Although Pataudi refused to field in the leg trap in the first Test, contemporary diagrams show that he did so during the second Test.) Allen had no compunction fielding there; at short leg he held five catches from Larwood's bowling in the series. Upon his return to England, Allen continued to oppose Bodyline tactics, making his opinion known to senior figures in the MCC, and leading a debate among county representatives which resulted in legislation to ban the tactic after the 1934 season.

=== Change of career ===
During the Bodyline tour, his first visit to Australia since the age of six, Allen spent time visiting friends and family. Before returning to England, the MCC played two Tests in New Zealand. Allen played in both, but batted just once and, still feeling the effects of his injury, took only two wickets. The team returned to England via Canada, but Allen parted company in Vancouver to meet friends in Los Angeles. During his trip, he met several Hollywood stars and passed through Chicago and New York on his way back to England. In New York, he met and fell in love with Norah Grace, the daughter of a shipping magnate. She travelled to England in 1934, and the pair wrote frequently to each other, but Grace died from Bright's disease in 1935.

Allen did not feel suited to working in a department store, and on his return home took a job with the stockbroking company David Bevan and Co. Consequently, he played little cricket in 1933. He planned to be unavailable for the Test matches against the West Indies, but Larwood was injured and Voce out of form, so he was persuaded to play in the first Test. He played little thereafter that season and declined an invitation to tour India with an MCC team. In three games that season, he scored 199 runs and took 13 wickets. That December, he was elected as a member of the Stock Exchange.

As the 1934 season began, Allen was recovering from an operation to repair a rupture and played only once before that summer's Ashes series, in which Bob Wyatt captained England. Injury ruled him out of the second Test, but he was fit for the third. In a drawn game, he scored 61 runs but took no wickets; troubled by uneven footholds, he bowled three wides and four no-balls during his first over, which lasted for 13 deliveries. He was selected for the fourth Test but, unhappy with his fitness, withdrew to play for Middlesex. He was successful in several games preceding the final, deciding Test, and was included in the team. Australia won comfortably after scoring 701 in their first innings; Allen took four for 170 and was wicketless in the second innings. In two Tests, he took five wickets at an average in excess of 70 and scored 106 runs at 35.33. In all first-class games that season he scored 438 runs at 25.76 and took 51 wickets at 27.49. Amid growing speculation that Allen would be chosen as the next England captain, Warner arranged for him to captain a low-key tour to Gibraltar in early 1935. During the return journey, Allen pulled a muscle when his ship pitched unexpectedly; the injury limited his cricket during 1935. He played twice before withdrawing from the rest of the season on medical advice. Off the field, Allen was elected to the MCC Committee at the unusually young age of 32.

== England captain ==
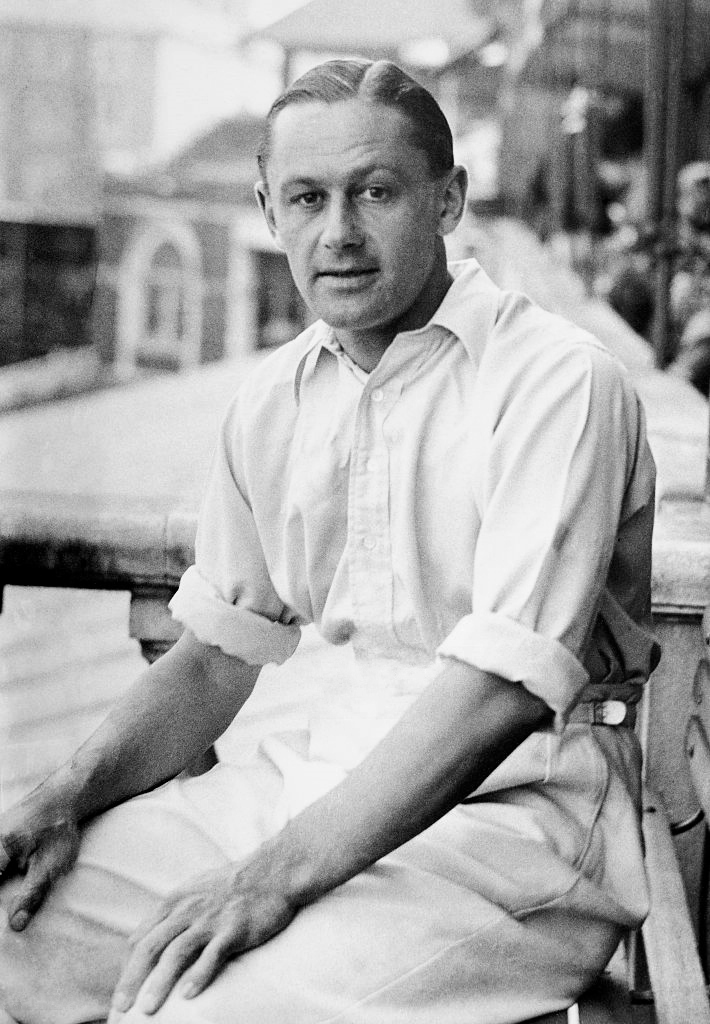
Allen c. 1935

=== Selection as captain ===
Prior to the 1936 season, Allen was the leading contender to replace Wyatt as England captain; under Wyatt's leadership, the team had lost three successive Test series. Although still unable to appear regularly, Allen played 16 first-class matches, his most in a season since 1926; he scored 598 runs at an average of 35.17, and took 81 wickets, his best return in a season. When selected to lead one of the teams in a Test trial match, he was effective enough for the selectors to name him as England captain for the series against India. England won the first Test by eight wickets. Allen took five for 35 in his first innings as captain and a further five wickets in the second innings, making this the only Test in which he took ten wickets. The selectors at this time set about choosing a captain and team for the MCC tour of Australia in the 1936–37 season. At least one selector favoured Claude Ashton, who played first-class cricket infrequently; Allen informed the selectors that, were Ashton to be made captain, he would not take part in the tour. Soon after the first Test, Allen was chosen to captain the Gentlemen against the Players, the only time he did so, and the MCC announced that he would captain the MCC in Australia. Allen believed that Warner was influential in securing his appointment, but that his Australian background was also important given that the tour had to repair tensions left over from 1932 to 1933.

Allen captained England in the remaining two Tests against India. The second game was drawn but England won the third and Allen took seven for 80, his best figures in Test matches. In the Tests, Allen scored 27 runs in three innings, and took 20 wickets at 16.50. His good form for Middlesex continued throughout the season and he performed well against some of the strongest opposition; he topped the county's batting averages and came second in bowling. The MCC team for Australia was chosen in several stages with input from Allen. Larwood was not considered; he had spoken out in the press against Australia and opponents of Bodyline, and like Voce, had not played a Test since the 1932–33 series. The selectors wished to include Voce but Allen at first threatened to resign were he to be included. He met Voce to discuss matters and the latter agreed to sign a statement in which he apologised for the past and in effect promised not to bowl Bodyline. He was therefore named in the touring team.

=== Tour of Australia, 1936–37 ===
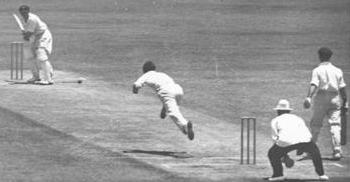
Allen bowling to Stan McCabe during the first Test of the 1936–37 Ashes

The inexperience of the tour manager, Rupert Howard, and Allen's vice-captain, Walter Robins, left Allen with a heavy workload for the 1936–37 tour; he later suggested to the MCC that this affected his form. In the early part of the tour, Allen selected the team by himself, but later used Robins, Bob Wyatt, Wally Hammond and Maurice Leyland as a selection committee. (Note: According to Allen, he had been told before the tour by Stanley Jackson, the chairman of selectors, that he could only use Robins and Wyatt, the other amateurs in the team, as tour selectors; Allen wanted to use Hammond and Leyland but Jackson refused to compromise. Instead, Allen said he would act as the only selector and once the team arrived in Australia, beyond Jackson's influence, he appointed his own unofficial selection panel.)

The team was hampered throughout by injuries—at one point, seven of the sixteen players were unfit—and the absence of senior players meant that Allen had to play more matches. He played well in the early games, but the team's results were poor as players struggled to adapt to the Australian pitches. When the Test series began, Australia were clear favourites. In the first Test, in reply to England's first innings of 358, Australia were bowled out for 234. When England batted again, Allen top-scored with 68, an innings he later rated the best of his career. England made 256 and, on a pitch affected by rain, Allen took five for 36 as Australia were bowled out for 58 to lose by 322 runs. Allen's team also won the second Test. England scored 426 for six on the first two days before rain prompted Allen to declare. On a damaged pitch, he took three for 19; Australia were bowled out for 80 and eventually lost by an innings. During the second Australian innings, Bradman, the Australian captain, who went on to score 82, was at one point dropped by Robins. The latter apologised, but Allen replied: "Oh, forget it, old boy, it's probably cost us the rubber, but what the hell!"

Rain affected the third Test; on the second day, Australia declared having scored 200 for nine in their first innings. In reply, England lost regular wickets as the effects of rain made the pitch almost impossible to bat on. Several critics, including members of his own team, suggested Allen should have declared to force Australia to bat when the pitch remained very difficult. Allen considered the risk to be too great and did not declare until the score had reached 76 for nine. Bradman then reversed his batting order to protect his main batsmen until the conditions eased; the tactic worked, as he and Jack Fingleton shared a partnership of 346 for the sixth wicket. Bradman scored 270 and England were defeated by 365 runs. In the fourth Test, Australia were bowled out for 288 in their first innings, when several of Allen's tactical moves worked well. England replied with 330, and Australia scored 433 in the second innings. Needing to score 392 to win, England were bowled out for 243, and the series was level at 2–2.

Complaining of exhaustion, and struggling with an injury, Allen rested from the MCC's next tour games. He was criticised for this, by Warner among others, particularly when the team lost in his absence. Allen proposed that he miss the final Test, but the other selectors insisted he play. For the game, Australia chose a fast bowler, Laurie Nash, who had returned to first-class cricket after a three-year absence to play for Victoria against the MCC. Allen, concerned over the possible use of Bodyline by Nash, who had bowled short against the MCC, spoke to Bradman before the game. Bradman replied that an opposing captain could not veto members of his team, at which Allen went to the umpires and threatened to bring his team off the field if Bodyline was used. Struggling with a leg injury, Allen was below his best. Australia won the toss, scored 604 and, assisted by rain, bowled England out for 239 and 165 to win the match and series; Nash did not bowl too short, although the occasional one did "nip up" to hit the batsman.

The series was watched by over 900,000 people in total; the MCC took home a larger profit than on any previous tour. Allen was treated sympathetically by press and public. The Wisden review of the tour suggested: "It would be churlish to criticise Allen's captaincy. During the first two Tests, almost every one of his moves succeeded instantly ... No doubt, Allen had studied his opponents carefully and knew their weaknesses, and if his tactics were not always dictated by accepted principles they certainly proved very successful. Those who attributed so much of the England captain's success to good luck were inclined to overlook the many stratagems exploited by him". In the Test series, he scored 150 runs at 18.75 and took 17 wickets at 30.94. During the tour, Allen struck up a friendship with Bradman and encouraged his team to fraternise with the Australian team. He clashed over tactics with one of his team, Joe Hardstaff; the pair never got along thereafter.

The team played three games in New Zealand before returning home via America; Allen left the team early and spent time in Hollywood. In all first-class games, he scored 380 runs at 25.33 and took 38 wickets at 26.23.

== Later career ==
=== Before the war ===
A combination of fatigue from the Australian tour and his need to return to work reduced the amount of cricket Allen played in 1937, and he announced his unavailability for the summer's Test series against New Zealand. He played just four first-class games that season, scored 161 runs and took 15 wickets. When the following season began, he remained in contention for the England captaincy for the 1938 Ashes series. Wally Hammond, formerly a professional, became an amateur before the season, immediately making him another candidate. Allen played several times in the early season for Middlesex and performed well with bat and ball, but injured his back. Even so, he was selected to captain "the Rest" against England in a Test trial, but was annoyed that Hammond was preferred as captain of the England team, particularly as Warner had not discussed the matter with him. In the event, Allen withdrew on the grounds of fitness, and did not play again for over a month. When he returned, his form was good but a succession of injuries plagued him for the rest of the season. In 13 first-class games, Allen scored 431 runs, with a highest score of 64, at an average of 26.93. He also took 23 wickets at 25.00. In July 1938, Allen was commissioned into the Territorial Army as a second lieutenant. He joined the City of London Yeomanry along with several friends and colleagues, and this took up much of his time in 1938 and 1939. He had time for five first-class games in 1939, scoring 164 runs and taking 16 wickets, before he was called up to the regular army on 24 August 1939.

=== War service ===
Allen's regiment was part of the Royal Artillery; he quickly became involved with Anti-Aircraft Command and began to associate with Royal Air Force (RAF) officers. In 1940, he was appointed as an Anti-Aircraft (AA) liaison officer to RAF Hawkinge, part of an initiative to share intelligence on German AA operations with bomber groups; these posts were controlled by a branch of Military Intelligence, MI14E. Later that year, Allen's brother Geoffrey was killed fighting in France.

In June 1940, Allen was appointed as a flak liaison officer to Five Group, an RAF Bomber Command group responsible for distributing intelligence on German air defences collated by MI14 to bomber stations. Through this position, Allen became friends with Arthur "Bomber" Harris, who commanded Five Group at the time. As part of his work there, Allen accompanied one bombing mission to the Ruhr, to gain first hand experience of AA defences. In December, Allen was appointed to lead the MI14E section which collated AA intelligence; aside from appointing flak liaison officers, Allen received sensitive intelligence data from a variety of sources on German air defences. He remained in this position for the rest of the war, being promoted to lieutenant colonel when MI14E became MI15. Throughout the war, he also found time to play regular charity cricket matches. Allen left the army in July 1945.

=== Last years as a cricketer ===
After the war, Allen dedicated most of his time to stockbroking and was made a partner by David Bevan and Co. He had little time for cricket, although he appeared twice for Middlesex in 1946. The following season, he played once for Middlesex, and captained their second team. He also played twice for the Free Foresters, a club of wandering amateurs, in first-class games. Late in the 1947 season, Allen was asked to captain and manage an MCC team which was to tour the West Indies that winter. The young and experimental team suffered badly with injuries; Allen missed several matches himself through strains. In first-class games on the tour he scored 262 runs and took six wickets, but writing in Wisden, Norman Preston judged: "Allen was too old." Allen also clashed with several members of his team; he did not get along with Ken Cranston, his vice-captain, nor Joe Hardstaff, his senior professional. When Allen tried to impose discipline on the team to prevent his players staying out late to drink alcohol, neither Cranston nor Hardstaff backed him.

With many players indisposed and his options limited, Allen requested reinforcements and the MCC sent out Len Hutton in time for the third Test; in the meantime, Allen asked S. C. Griffith, not a highly regarded batsman, to open the batting for England in the second Test. Griffith responded by batting the entire first day and scoring 140 runs in total, his maiden century in first-class cricket. The West Indies won the last two Tests (the first two having been drawn) to win the series; the MCC team did not win a single match on the tour. Allen later regretted accepting the invitation to lead the team. In three Tests, he scored 94 runs and took five wickets. Allen did not play any more Test cricket; in 25 matches, he scored 750 runs at an average of 24.19 and took 81 wickets at 29.37.

Although Allen appeared four times for Middlesex in 1948, most of his remaining cricket was played for the Free Foresters against Cambridge University. On very good batting pitches, the matches lacked a competitive edge, but in 12 games between 1948 and his retirement, he scored four centuries and averaged over 80 with the bat. In 1948, he scored 180 in the fixture, the highest score of his career; in combination with his success in Middlesex matches, he finished on top of the English batting averages that season. He played his final Middlesex games in 1950, captaining the team in four matches in the absence of the regular captain, and made his final first-class appearance for the Free Foresters in 1954. In all first-class cricket, he scored 9,233 runs at an average of 28.67 and took 788 wickets at 22.23.

== Cricketing technique ==
He bowls really fast, with an action answering to classical requirements, sideways on, left shoulder seen momentarily by the batsman, then a strong urgent swing over, after a run to attack that is sturdy and galloping and not too long.

— Neville Cardus

Allen was capable of bowling unusually quickly. Critics judged him to have an excellent bowling action, through which he achieved his pace. He bowled from sideways on, and according to his Wisden obituary, had "a rhythmical run-up and full follow-through". R. C. Robertson-Glasgow described Allen in 1943: "Of no more than medium height, he has a solid yet elastic strength, every unit of which is used in the delivery and in a follow-through which is the finest I have ever seen." Robertson-Glasgow continued: "His bowling, though it varies from piercing accuracy to almost ludicrous irrelevance, has often touched greatness." Although opposed to Bodyline tactics in Australia, Allen often bowled short to intimidate batsmen in county cricket—for example, he once struck Wyatt over the heart with a fast ball.

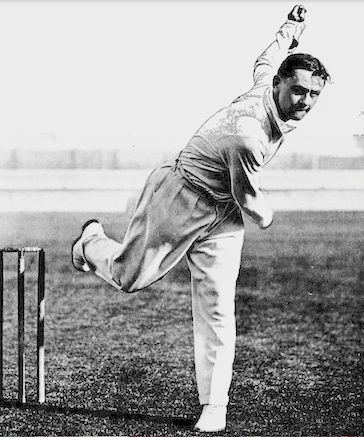
Allen bowling in 1932

During the early part of his career, Allen was often in competition with Larwood. Swanton suggests that, had he played regularly, Allen may have matched the achievements of Larwood. Other critics had reservations. Alan Gibson, in his study of England captains, wrote that Allen "was a fast bowler, not quite of the highest class"; he noted that Allen became more accurate as he got older, but this was offset by a loss of pace. Robertson-Glasgow believed that Allen suffered from not bowling regularly. When called upon to play while lacking practice, he often "bowled wildly or inconsistently". But Woodcock and Robertson-Glasgow believed that, in this period, only Larwood was capable of more devastating spells of fast bowling among Englishmen.

As a batsman, Allen was technically sound. Robertson-Glasgow described him as a "correct, strong and courageous" batsman who was at his best when his team most needed runs. Gibson called him as a "hard-hitting batsman in the middle of the order". In later years, his understanding of batting technique enabled him to co-write the MCC coaching book. Gibson described Allen as an unlucky captain, affected by injuries and poor selection, who had little opportunity to lead teams. He judged him to be an orthodox tactician, possibly influenced by the fact that his two predecessors, Jardine and Wyatt, often used highly unusual tactics. Gibson stated that Allen was popular with his teams and that his influence during the potentially difficult Australia tour of 1936–37 was crucial. Wyatt rated him as a good captain, and stated: "As a captain, he was a disciplinarian but was always most considerate to the members of his side".

== Administrative career ==
Allen's Wisden obituary stated: "[He] had a stronger influence on the welfare and development of cricket than anyone since Lord Harris [who died in 1932] over a period of more than 50 years." Gibson, writing in 1979, described Allen as "a patriarchal, though not aloof, figure at Lord's". Ian Peebles, a teammate of Allen's at Middlesex and later a journalist, said of him: "Allen's impact [as an administrator at Lord's] was immediate and it was the foundation of a remarkable career in the course of which he was to initiate and sponsor measures which affected every possible aspect of the game."

=== After the Second World War ===
In the final stages of his playing career, Allen became increasingly influential off the field. After the war, he rejoined the MCC Committee. One of his first actions, prompted by a conversation with Hutton on the West Indies tour, was to secure honorary membership of the club for prominent retired professional cricketers. Allen was heavily involved in an MCC drive to improve youth cricket in the early 1950s. Unlike many of the cricketing Establishment, who saw improved public school and amateur cricket as a priority, Allen wanted the MCC to focus on state schools and boys who did not have access to top-class facilities. In 1951, the club formed the MCC Youth Cricket Association, of which Allen was a member. Another part of the process was the compilation of the MCC coaching book in 1951, which aimed to improve coaching standards throughout the country. Allen worked in collaboration with Harry Altham; Allen was responsible for the technical aspects of the publication. In later years, Allen judged this work to improve youth cricket as one of his proudest achievements as an administrator. In his survey of English cricket in the 1950s, Tim Quelch states that the coaching drive, and other similar initiatives at the time, achieved little owing to the limited resources available and because the boys coached had little opportunity to play cricket.

=== Test selector ===
In July 1954, Allen was involved in the selection of the MCC team to tour Australia in 1954–55, as the MCC's representative. That winter, he travelled to Australia to expand his business contacts and was present when England won three Test matches, which ensured victory in the series. Before the 1955 season, he was nominated as the Chairman of Selectors, and as his senior partner at David Bevan had no objection, he accepted. The workload of the post brought his playing days to an end.

Allen served as chairman from 1955 to 1961; under him were three other selectors, who varied throughout his period as chairman, and the serving England captain. Among Allen's priorities were to promote attacking batsmanship, good fielding, and for the team to bowl overs more quickly. While looking for new batting talent, Allen often promoted young amateur batsmen; several emerged in this period, including Ted Dexter and Colin Cowdrey, who had successful careers and were part of a strong English batting line-up. At least one member of the England team, Jim Laker, resented the preference of amateurs, whom he believed were paid more for playing than the professionals. Many professional cricketers thought that Allen was a snob who preferred to keep them in their place; critics believed that he deliberately restricted the career of Les Jackson for reasons of class. Allen also played the role of disciplinarian. Several of the England players enjoyed a hectic social life; it was often left to Allen to issue warnings when they transgressed. He played an active role in home Test matches, generally attending at least three of the five days of every game, discussing tactics with the captain, and speaking to the press. In his first season, Allen was involved in the appointment of a new captain; Len Hutton, the serving captain, retired from the team with injury. In his place, the selectors appointed May, who served until 1959 and again in 1961; he and Allen established a good working relationship. When May was absent from the team with illness during parts of 1960 and 1961, Cowdrey replaced him.

Allen and May's first series in control resulted in a 3–2 win over South Africa. In 1956, the Australians toured England. The home team won the five-match series 2–1. The selectors made several important decisions throughout the series. In the third Test, Allen pushed for the inclusion of Cyril Washbrook, who was then 41 years old and had not played a Test for five years. The decision was controversial, and Quelch suggests that, with the series in the balance after England lost the second Test, Allen was feeling the pressure. He was also criticised in the press by Bill Bowes, a former England teammate, for forcing one of the England team, Fred Trueman, to bowl at a handkerchief during practice before the match, in an attempt to improve his accuracy. The incident took place before a large crowd; although Trueman kept his counsel at the time, he felt humiliated and believed that Allen and the Establishment intended to keep him in his place. Washbrook scored 98, and England won the match. In the fourth game, David Sheppard, who had barely played in 1956, was selected and scored a century, and in the final Test Denis Compton was recalled after a long-term injury and scored 94. The Wisden editor Norman Preston judged the selectors to have done a good job that season, making choices with which critics disagreed. He wrote: "I think it is appropriate, therefore, that tribute be paid to [the selectors] for the time and patience they devoted to their task last summer. Nothing was too much trouble for them." Allen was involved in one controversial episode, when the Australians accused him and other selectors of arranging for the pitches during the Test matches to give a lot of assistance to spin bowlers, which led to Laker's extraordinary success in the series. Allen denied any involvement. During the winter, Allen was part of an advisory group which looked for ways to revitalise county cricket.

England won the 1957 Test series against the West Indies 3–0 and the 1958 series against New Zealand 4–0. But despite having what was regarded as a strong team, England lost 4–0 in Australia in 1958–59. The team was more successful afterwards, beating India 5–0 in 1959, defeating West Indies 1–0 in 1959–60 and South Africa 3–0 in 1960. Allen's final series as chairman was against Australia in 1961; England lost after making tactical mistakes in the fourth Test.

=== Influence behind the scenes ===
In 1956, Allen became chairman of the MCC's Cricket Committee. The committee looked at ways to improve cricket, for example analysing whether reducing the size of the ball would help bowlers. Allen also began to pursue bowlers with illegal bowling actions; commentators were aware that this was a growing issue but no action had been taken, and Allen took the lead. Three English bowlers were no-balled for throwing in 1959 and another five in 1960. Geoff Griffin, a bowler who toured England with the South African team in 1960, was perceived to have a suspect action; when the bowler was no-balled for throwing in a Test match, the South African press suggested that Allen had played a prominent part. Later that year, Allen met Bradman, Australia's representative at the Imperial Cricket Conference (ICC); the pair wanted to ensure that bowling actions would be fair in future, and the ICC agreed to take action. When Australia toured England in 1961, no bowlers whose actions had been questioned were included in either team. Allen later took the lead in re-drafting the law on throwing.

When the MCC abolished amateur status in cricket in 1963, making all cricketers paid professionals, Allen opposed the change. In 1963, he was appointed as MCC President. When his one-year term of office ended in late 1964, he was appointed to the influential role of MCC Treasurer, a position he filled until 1976. During this period, Allen instituted several reforms, including limiting the terms of office of key positions. He streamlined the MCC administration and recruited new people to key positions. Less successfully, he opposed the relaxation of eligibility rules for the County Championship to allow overseas players from 1968. He was heavily involved in a change in the relationship between the MCC and English cricket in 1968. The newly formed Sports Council required that, to receive financial support from the government, cricket be more democratically organised and not run by a private members' club. Allen and S. C. Griffith, the MCC secretary, liaised with the Minister of Sport to set up a new Cricket Council, comprising representatives from the MCC, the new Test and County Cricket Board and the National Cricket Association. This move significantly reduced the influence of the MCC, and at Allen's suggestion, the club's influence within the Cricket Council was further reduced in 1974.

Allen was prosperous by this stage of his life. An inheritance from his mother, his earnings on the Stock Exchange and the success of investments he had made in Australia left him affluent—his knowledge of Australian markets was respected in the City. In 1965, Allen underwent the first of four hip operations spread over the following 14 years; he believed that his fast bowling may have brought about his hip problems.

=== D'Oliveira affair ===
In 1968, the MCC was involved in controversy over the non-selection of the mixed-race cricketer Basil D'Oliveira to tour South Africa, which was then under apartheid. The South African government did not want D'Oliveira, himself South African-born, in the England team because of his colour. The MCC were aware that there was opposition to a tour taking place, and that D'Oliveira's place in the team would be an issue, but wanted the tour to go ahead. The Shadow Foreign Secretary and former MCC President Sir Alec Douglas-Home visited South Africa in January 1968 and met the South African Prime Minister B. J. Vorster, who privately did not want D'Oliveira to come to South Africa under any circumstances. Vorster suggested to Douglas-Home that the MCC should not explicitly ask whether D'Oliveira's selection would be acceptable, but that it was likely no protest would be made. Douglas-Home passed this information to the MCC and advised them not to push for an answer. They had earlier written to the South African Cricket Association to establish whether they had a free hand in choosing a team, but their change of strategy meant that when the official reply arrived Allen refused to take receipt of it. In his biography of D'Oliveira, Peter Oborne writes that Allen and the MCC secretary Billy Griffith wished to hide any South African reply from the full MCC Committee to avoid raising awkward questions over Vorster's intentions.

In March 1968, Lord Cobham, an MCC member who wanted the tour to go ahead, met Vorster, who told him that D'Oliveira would not be an acceptable selection to the South African government. Cobham communicated this information to an MCC Committee member, whose identity has never been made public, by private letter. Other than the recipient, only Allen, Griffith and the then-President Arthur Gilligan were aware of the letter, but they chose to keep its contents from the rest of the committee. Allen's justification was that Douglas-Home, a statesman and former Prime Minister, had given advice which contradicted this; also, other Committee members were Test selectors and Allen believed that the information would place non-cricketing pressures on their choices for the England team. Oborne suggests that Douglas-Home's advice was made redundant by Cobham's letter, and that Allen's supposed desire to protect the other selectors was "preposterous" as the tour would have been cancelled.

When the English selectors met to choose the team, Allen, Griffith and Gilligan were present to represent the MCC; they had no official say in the selection, but Oborne suggests that Allen made it clear that he considered D'Oliveira unworthy of a place on the team on cricketing grounds. D'Oliveira was eventually left out, to considerable anger and controversy. When he was later added to the team following an injury to another player, Vorster said that the MCC would not be welcome and the tour was cancelled. Some of the events leading up to D'Oliveira's exclusion became public knowledge the following year; the MCC came under heavy public pressure, and the press called for Allen to resign. Oborne suggests that Allen, although not a supporter of apartheid, wished to maintain the traditional links between England and South Africa; he regarded opponents of apartheid as enemies of the MCC and the Establishment.

In 1970, the proposed visit of a South African team to England was subject of widespread public opposition. The MCC was no longer solely responsible for any decisions, being only a part of the Cricket Council, but Allen pressed the government to intervene and decide whether the tour should go ahead. He believed it was a political matter outside the scope of cricket authorities; the government eventually became involved and the tour was cancelled.

=== Final years ===
Allen retired from the Stock Exchange in 1972, resigned as MCC Treasurer in 1976 and left the Cricket Council in 1982. He was appointed a CBE in 1962 and knighted in 1986. In 1968, Allen moved to a flat directly behind the Pavilion at Lord's, where he lived until his death. Following his retirement, he spent much of his time in the MCC Committee room, watching cricket at Lord's. He never married, and died at home on 29 November 1989, suffering from the effects of a stomach operation earlier in the year. He is buried at Brookwood Cemetery in Brookwood, Surrey, England.

== Bibliography ==
- Douglas, Christopher (2002). Douglas Jardine: Spartan Cricketer. London: Methuen. ISBN 0-413-77216-0.
- Frith, David (2002). Bodyline Autopsy. The full story of the most sensational Test cricket series: Australia v England 1932–33. London: Aurum Press. ISBN 1-85410-896-4.
- Gibson, Alan (1979). The Cricket Captains of England. London: Cassell. ISBN 0-304-29779-8.
- Marshall, Michael (1987). Gentlemen and Players: Conversations with Cricketers. London: Grafton Books. ISBN 0-246-11874-1.
- Oborne, Peter (2004). Basil D'Oliveira. Cricket and Conspiracy: The Untold Story. London: Little, Brown. ISBN 0-316-72572-2.
- Quelch, Tim (2012). Bent Arms & Dodgy Wickets: England's Troubled Reign as Test Match Kings during the Fifties. Durrington: Pitch Publishing. ISBN 978-1-909178-39-7.
- Robertson-Glasgow, R. C. (1943). Cricket Prints: Some Batsmen and Bowlers, 1920–1940. London: T. Werner Laurie Ltd. OCLC 3257334.
- Swanton, E. W. (1985). Gubby Allen: Man of Cricket. London: Hutchinson/Stanley Paul. ISBN 0-09-159780-3.

Sporting positions
| Preceded by Bob Wyatt | English national cricket captain 1936–1936/7 | Succeeded by Walter Robins |
| Preceded by Norman Yardley | English national cricket captain 1947/48 | Succeeded by Norman Yardley |
