= Third Test, 1932–33 Ashes series =

Test cricket match

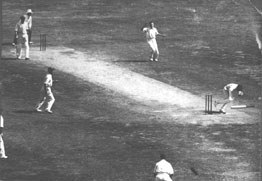
Bert Oldfield is struck on the head by a fast ball from Harold Larwood, Third Test

The Third Test of the 1932–33 Ashes series was one of five Tests in a cricket series between Australia and England. The match was played at the Adelaide Oval in Adelaide from 13 to 19 January 1933, with a rest day on 15 January. England won the match by 338 runs to take a series lead of 2 Tests to 1 with 2 Tests to play.

The Test was noted as the one in which the controversy over the use of "bodyline" tactics by the English team came to a head. These tactics, employed by the England fast bowlers Harold Larwood and Bill Voce on the direction of their captain, Douglas Jardine, engendered much ill-feeling.

== Background ==
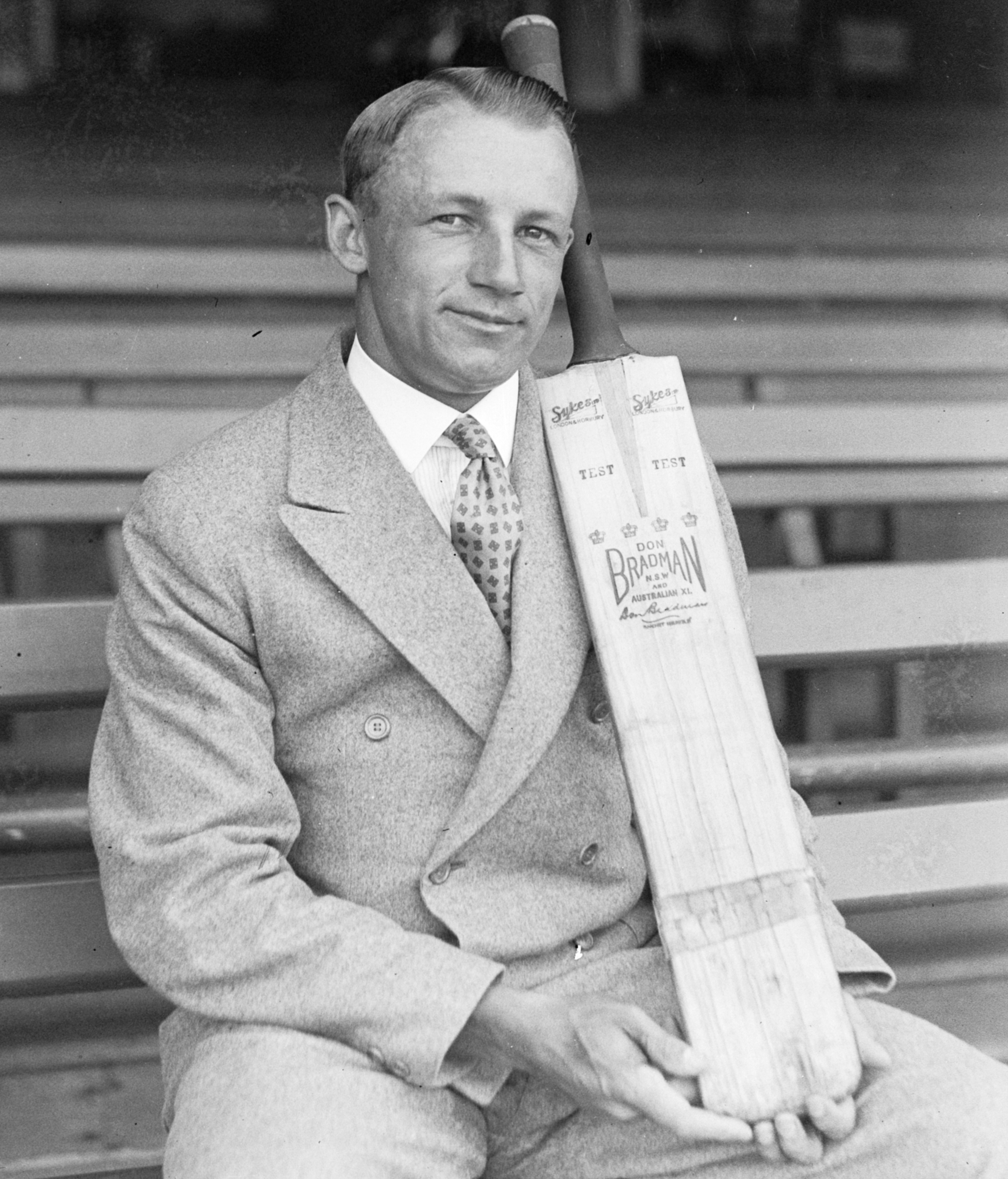
Donald Bradman, the main target of bodyline.

In 1932–33, the English team led by Douglas Jardine toured Australia and won the Ashes in a highly acrimonious series known as the "bodyline series". It has been described as the most controversial period in Australian cricket history, and voted the most important Australian moment by a panel of Australian cricket identities.

The English team used controversial bowling tactics where the English fast bowlers Harold Larwood, Bill Voce and Bill Bowes bowled the cricket ball roughly on the line of leg stump. The deliveries were often short pitched, bouncing as high as the head and torso of the batsman, with four or five fielders close by on the leg side waiting to catch deflections off the bat. The tactics were difficult for batsmen to counter. The only options for a batsman were to duck, carrying the risk of being hit on pitches with irregular bounce, or to play the ball. However, defensive shots risked a catch in the cordon, while hooking carried the danger of being hit in the head at dangerous speeds. The bowling was designed to be intimidatory, causing controversy and ill-feeling among the Australian players and crowds. The primary target of bodyline was Donald Bradman who had overwhelmed the English bowling in the 1930 Ashes series. Generally regarded as the greatest batsman of all time, Bradman had scored a world record 974 Test runs during that series, a feat which remains unsurpassed. English cricket commentators feared that Bradman would be unstoppable on good Australian batting wickets in 1932–33 and looked for weaknesses.

On the journey to Australia, Jardine discussed tactics with Larwood and other bowlers, and he may have met senior batsmen Wally Hammond and Herbert Sutcliffe. Some players reported that Jardine told them to hate the Australians to defeat them, while instructing them to refer to Bradman as "the little bastard." At this stage, he seems to have settled on leg theory, if not full bodyline, as his main tactic. While Jardine's unfriendly approach and superior manner caused some friction with the press and spectators, the early tour matches were uncontroversial and Larwood and Voce had a light workload in preparation for the Test series. This changed in the match against an Australian XI where the bowlers first used bodyline tactics. Under the captaincy of Bob Wyatt, Jardine having rested from the match, the England attack bowled short and around leg stump, with fielders positioned close by on the leg side to catch any deflections. Wyatt later claimed that this was not pre-planned and he simply passed on to Jardine what happened after the match. The bodyline tactics continued in the next match and several players were hit. The Australian press were shocked and criticised the hostility of Larwood in particular. Former players joined the criticism by saying that the tactics were ethically wrong. However, at this stage, not everyone was opposed. The Australian Board of Control believed the English bowlers had not bowled unfairly when Bradman expressed his concern to them. Jardine increasingly came into disagreement with tour manager Plum Warner over bodyline as the tour progressed. Warner opposed bodyline but would not speak out against it. However, he was accused of hypocrisy for not taking a stand on either side, particularly after expressing sentiments at the start of the tour that cricket "has become a synonym for all that is true and honest. To say 'that is not cricket' implies something underhand, something not in keeping with the best ideals ... all who love it as players, as officials or spectators must be careful lest anything they do should do it harm." Furthermore, he had criticised bowler Bill Bowes for using short-pitched bowling against Jack Hobbs in a match at the end of the 1932 season.

=== Earlier tests ===
Jardine's tactics were successful in one respect: in six innings against the tourists ahead of the Tests, Bradman had scored only 103 runs, causing concern among the Australian public who expected much more from him. He missed the first Test, worn out by constant cricket and the ongoing argument. Australia lost heavily by ten wickets as Larwood took ten wickets, as the English bowlers used bodyline intermittently, to the crowd's vocal displeasure. The only Australian batsman to make an impact was Stan McCabe, who hooked and pulled everything aimed at his upper body, undeterred by the prospect of taking a potentially lethal blow to the head. He scored 187 not out in four hours, an innings described by leading historian David Frith as "among the most stirring innings Test cricket has ever produced". Behind the scenes, administrators began to express concerns to each other. Yet the English tactics did not earn universal disapproval; former Australian captain Monty Noble praised the English bowling. For the second Test, Bradman returned to the team after his newspaper employers released him from his contract. England continued to use bodyline tactics. Bradman was dismissed by his first ball in the first innings, bowled by Bowes. Jardine was observed to be so delighted that he clasped his hands above his head and performed a "war dance". This was an extremely unusual reaction in the 1930s, particularly from Jardine who rarely showed any emotion while playing cricket. However, in the second innings, against the full bodyline attack, Bradman scored an unbeaten century, his only one of the series, which helped Australia to win the match and level the series at one match each.

The victory was met by widespread public jubilation, as many believed that Australia had found a means of overcoming the tactics. Critics began to believe bodyline was not quite the threat that had been perceived and Bradman's reputation, which had suffered slightly with his earlier failures, was restored. On the other hand, the pitch was slightly slower than was customary throughout the series, and Larwood was suffering from problems with his boots which reduced his effectiveness.

=== Woodfull's approach ===
Meanwhile, Bill Woodfull's physical courage, stoic and dignified leadership won him many admirers. He refused to employ retaliatory tactics and did not publicly complain even though he and his men were repeatedly hit— according to Ken Piesse, 34 times in all. Woodfull, was being encouraged to retaliate to the short-pitched English attack. However, the Australian captain refused to consider doing so. Before the Second Test in Melbourne, he had to wait until minutes before the game before he was confirmed as captain by the selectors, causing the toss to be delayed and leading to speculation that the Australian Board of Control wanted to remove Woodfull because of his refusal to allow his bowlers to retaliate. His deputy Victor Richardson advocated retaliation along with several other players. Richardson recalled Woodfull's private response: "There is no way I will be influenced to adopt such tactics which bring such discredit to the game. I know Tim could do it but I am not going to participate in actions that can only hurt the game."

The media advocated the selection of Eddie Gilbert, an indigenous bowler of extreme pace, in order to return the bodyline barrage. In one tour match, Gilbert had bloodied Jardine and left a bruise the size of a saucer. Another suggested means of retaliation was Laurie Nash, a footballer and paceman whose notoriously abrasive personality and aggression saw him regarded as a thug. However, Woodfull was totally unmoved by such suggestions.

=== Team selection ===
In the buildup to the third Test, Jardine banned spectators from watching his players at net practice after he had been barracked. The press were unable to watch and therefore give detailed previews before the match started. The tourists' preparations were also hampered by stories in the press that Maurice Tate and Jardine had come to blows, which Tate later denied was true or even realistic. There were questions over the form of Jardine, who had scored just 28 runs in his three innings in the series, Jardine suggested that he should stand down from the team. The rest of the tour selection committee, Wally Hammond, Bob Wyatt, Herbert Sutcliffe and Warner would not consider dropping the captain. However, taking into account Jardine's nervousness before going in to bat, the senior players persuaded Jardine to open the batting with Sutcliffe. Sutcliffe and Jardine had occasionally opened together on the 1928–29 tour with some success.

The English selectors were concerned by the domination of the Australian spinners of Bill O'Reilly and Bert Ironmonger, who had reduced the tourists to strokelessness in the second Test. To counter this, Eddie Paynter was introduced into the side in the hope that his aggressive style and left-handed batting (in contrast to the rest of the batting line-up which was right-handed) would disrupt the Australian bowlers. He replaced the Nawab of Pataudi whose earlier successes, including a century on his Test match debut, were offset by his slow scoring. However, Pataudi's refusal to field close on the leg-side in the bodyline field setting, his friendliness with the opposition and the mutual antipathy between him and Jardine may also have contributed to the loss of his place. England made one other change. Although Bowes had dismissed Bradman in the second Test, he took no other wickets; Jardine believed that the Adelaide pitch was not helpful to fast bowlers, while spinner Jack White had taken thirteen wickets in the equivalent match four years previously. Consequently, Hedley Verity replaced Bowes in the team. Australia made just one change to the team which won the second Test. Leo O'Brien, who had scored 10 and 11 in that match, was relegated to twelfth man and Bill Ponsford returned to the side.

== 13 January: Day One ==
Jardine won the toss and chose to bat. Clem Hill remarked to Jardine that it should be a close game, but Jardine joked that he obviously had not seen who had won the toss. There had been rain on the day before the match and moisture was still present when Sutcliffe and Jardine went out to bat, which made the pitch difficult for batting that morning. Australia had played three spinners, so leg spinner O'Reilly took the new ball with the solitary paceman Tim Wall. The fourth ball, from Wall, bounced unexpectedly and hit Sutcliffe's shoulder, to the crowd's pleasure. After twenty minutes play, England had scored just four runs when Jardine was bowled off his pads trying to glance a swinging delivery from Wall. Hammond came in and looked uncomfortable as Wall bowled some short-pitched deliveries. He had to duck underneath one ball and departed after slashing wildly at a quick delivery and with the score at 16, he was caught by Wicket-keeper Bert Oldfield, standing further back than usual, diving across in front of first slip. Umpire George Hele believed Hammond may have deliberately got out. Jardine believed the ball had bounced lower than usual. As he walked off, disturbed by the frequency of short bowling, Hammond was heard to say "If that's what the bloody game's coming to, I've had enough of it." A second wicket fell without a run added as Sutcliffe, after 46 minutes batting, played a weak shot and hit O'Reilly in the air. Wall, at short square leg, dived forward to take a one-handed catch. Les Ames, who was in poor batting form, also looked uncomfortable. He batted unconvincingly for 39 minutes for three runs and did not score for 20 minutes; in that time, he edged the ball several times and was bowled by a no-ball from O'Reilly. Just as it appeared he was settling down, he was bowled by a faster ball from left arm orthodox spinner Bert Ironmonger. England's score was four wickets for 30 runs (4/30). The crowd were delighted by the course of the morning session; England had not expected to lose so many wickets so quickly and Hedley Verity and Gubby Allen, both due to bat lower in the order, were seen rushing to the dressing room to change in case they were needed to bat quickly. Maurice Leyland and Bob Wyatt took England to lunch without losing any more wickets and the score was 4/37 after 90 minutes play.

Leyland and Wyatt began a recovery after the interval, batting beyond tea in putting on a 156-run partnership and turning the match back towards England. During this stand, the pitch settled down and became easy to bat on as the moisture in the pitch dried out. Leyland began with a hooked four from Wall and began advancing down the pitch to Clarrie Grimmett. Jardine had told the pair to bat cautiously, but Wyatt hit three sixes, two off Grimmett; usually, he was a dour, defensive batsman. After the second six, Wyatt saw Jardine leave his seat on the pavilion balcony and return to the dressing room. The third six, a hook off the bowling of Wall, was nearly caught by Bradman at long leg. At one point during the stand, Leyland complained to the umpires that Ironmonger was using resin on the ball to increase his grip and allow him to spin the ball more. Ironmonger emptied his pocket to show there was nothing there, and Leyland apologised. However, Ironmonger seemed less effective after the challenge and umpire Hele remembered that Ironmonger emptied the wrong pocket and Leyland did not ask him to empty the other. Later in the day, Jardine sent out a message to the umpires pointing out that Richardson was changing his position behind the batsmen's backs. Wall tried bowling leg theory against Wyatt, but without a packed legside field, but Wyatt hooked the ball over the fielders' heads. Leyland and Wyatt added 100 runs in 90 minutes and the tea interval was taken with the score 4/154. The only possibility of a wicket was when Bert Oldfield failed to stump Leyland off Grimmett's bowling when the batsman had scored around 30.

After tea, O'Reilly bowled with five fielders on the leg side before dismissing Leyland when the batsman tried to hit a faster ball which bowled him via the bat and pad. Jardine wrote that "no praise can be too high for this exceedingly fine effort". He scored 83 from 190 balls in three hours. In all, he hit thirteen fours and his driving on the off-side was praised by Wisden Cricketers' Almanack, while Wilfred Rhodes, writing in England, believed that Leyland ought to become Sutcliffe's regular opening partner. Wyatt was dismissed soon afterwards, hitting a poor shot to mid off where Richardson held the catch. He said later that he should have hit the ball for four instead of getting out. He had scored 78 in 164 minutes from 176 balls. Jardine believed it was the best innings Wyatt had played, showing a more adventurous approach than usual for Wyatt and praised his driving, as well as his more familiar cuts and hooks. Jardine wrote that it was "a truly excellent display at a critical time". Wisden noted that Leyland and Wyatt "if enjoying a certain amount of luck, batted, in the circumstances, uncommonly well". The score was 6/196 and the innings was in danger of collapse. Australia took the new ball with the score at 200. Eddie Paynter held the innings together until the close of play, scoring 25 runs, using good footwork to attack Grimmett. However, after twice cutting Stan McCabe for four, Gubby Allen was leg before wicket (lbw) to Grimmett for 15 at 7/228. England reached the close of play at 7/236 with Verity on five. Jardine praised the bowling of Wall on the first day, but noted that by the final session, he was too tired to be effective.

== 14 January: Day Two ==
The second day's was watched by a record Adelaide Oval crowd of 50,962. Before play began, Paynter had been shaken when, en route to the cricket ground, an assailant knocked him to the floor before running away. Nevertheless, he and Verity resumed their overnight partnership and batted until lunch. Paynter frequently stretched forward to smother the spin bowling of O'Reilly and was not troubled by Grimmett. He was able to score by hitting the ball into the covers, while Verity concentrated on defence apart from a drive through point off Ironmonger. Both men looked to take quick runs as the fielders moved in to gather the ball. The only dangers came when Paynter slipped and Fingleton missed a chance to run him out when his throw missed the stumps, and Verity edged the ball past O'Reilly, standing too close at slip, from the bowling of Ironmonger. By the first interval of the day, the overnight batsmen had added 79 in the morning session, taking the total to 7/315.

A short ball from Wall removed Paynter for 77 when the Lancastrian tried to pull and was caught behind square leg. He received an excellent reception from the crowd and had added 96 with Verity. Wall then bowled Voce, who moved too far across the pitch and left his leg stump exposed, and had Verity caught by Richardson after scoring 45 in two-and-a-half hours. The English innings ended at 341, a substantial recovery after the poor start. Wall had figures of five wickets for 72 (5/72), while O'Reilly had bowled 50 overs two wickets. Jardine was disappointed that Larwood and Voce did not extend the innings, conscious that England now faced a long session of fielding as tea was taken between the innings.

Woodfull now opened Australia's batting with Jack Fingleton. Fingleton did not last long. Jardine believed that he, along with Richardson and McCabe, was showing an increasing mastery over bodyline. However, Jardine had noted that Fingleton had shown some uncertainty outside his off-stump against Gubby Allen during his innings of 83 at Melbourne. He now used Allen, bowling into the wind, to attack Fingleton. In Allen's second over, Fingleton was dismissed for a duck, touching a ball which was caught behind by Ames. Bradman now came to the middle, to an excellent reception.

Meanwhile, Larwood was surprised to find that he was making the ball swing into Woodfull, instead of away from right-handers as he usually did. Larwood bowled the third over of the innings; the fifth ball narrowly missed Woodfull's head. The final ball was short and on the line of middle stump and struck Woodfull over the heart. The batsman dropped his bat and staggered away holding his chest and bent over in pain. The England players surrounded Woodfull to offer sympathy but the crowd began to protest noisily. Jardine called to Larwood: "Well bowled, Harold!" Although the comment was aimed at unnerving Bradman, Woodfull was appalled. Play was briefly delayed while Woodfull recovered and continued once it was certain he could carry on. Larwood's over had ended and Woodfull did not face the bowling of Allen in the next over. However, when Larwood was ready to bowl at Woodfull again, play was again halted. Subsequently, Jardine claimed that Larwood requested a field change, Larwood said that Jardine had done so. The fielders were moved into bodyline positions, causing the crowd to protest and call abuse at the England team, even more so than when Woodfull was hit. Many commentators condemned the alteration of the field as unsporting, and the spectators became extremely volatile from anger. They viewed it as hitting a man when he was down. Mass hooting and jeering occurred after almost every ball. Some English players later expressed fears that a large-scale riot and that the police would not be able to stop the irate home crowd, who were worried that Woodfull or Bradman could be killed, from attacking them. Jardine, although writing that Woodfull could have retired hurt if he was unfit, later expressed his regret at making the field change at that moment. It is likely that Jardine wished to press home his team's advantage in the match, while the bodyline field was usually employed at that stage of an innings.

Shortly afterwards, a delivery from Larwood knocked Woodfull's bat from his hands and the Australian captain seemed unsettled. Two quick wickets fell before Ponsford joined Woodfull in the middle, but having been struck by short balls several more times, Woodfull was bowled by Allen for 22, having batted for an hour and a half. Vic Richardson replaced him at the crease. When an injury to Voce required a request for a doctor, many in the crowd believed it was Woodfull who required assistance, leading to a renewal of protest.

At the other end, Bradman was trying to defend stoutly with a straight bat over the ball, but with extra bounce, Larwood was causing the vertically challenger Bradman difficulty. Bradman was unable to keep one defensive shot down and it flew to Allen at short leg. Bradman was out for eight and McCabe came in at 2/18. McCabe felt that there was too much bounce for vertical-bat defensive shots to be effective and he tried to counterattack like he had in Sydney. On this occasion, he mistimed a hook from Larwood and was caught by Jardine at midwicket for eight.

Australia were 3/34 when Bill Ponsford came in to join his Victorian captain.

Woodfull battled it out for 89 minutes, collecting more bruises before Allen bowled him for 22, leaving the score at 4/51.

Later in the day, the English team manager Pelham Warner visited the Australian dressing room to express his sympathies to Woodfull. Woodfull had remained calm in public, refusing to complain about Jardine's tactics. Woodfull's abrupt response was meant to be private, but it was leaked to the press and became the most famous quotation of this tumultuous period in cricket history:

I do not want to see you, Mr Warner. There are two teams out there. One is playing cricket. The other is making no effort to do so.

Woodfull reportedly added "This game is too good to be spoilt. It's time some people got out of it", hinting that he might withdraw his team from competition in protest. Australia's Leo O'Brien later reported that Warner was close to tears following Woodfull's rebuke.

== 16–19 January: Day Three to Day Six ==
Ponsford was hit all over his back and shoulders because of his strategy of turning away and shielding his bat from the possibility of yielding a catch, and Australian wicketkeeper Bert Oldfield was struck a severe blow to the head while batting on the third day of the match, causing a fracture (although this was from a top edge off a traditional non-bodyline ball and Oldfield admitted it was his fault). While the crowd again showed their rage, Woodfull came onto the ground to help Oldfield back to the dressing room. As a result of the injuries, the costs of insurance cover for players doubled. During the fifth day's play the Australian Board of Control for International Cricket sent the following cable to the MCC in London:

Bodyline bowling has assumed such proportions as to menace the best interests of the game, making protection of the body by the batsman the main consideration. This is causing intensely bitter feeling between the players, as well as injury. In our opinion it is unsportsmanlike. Unless stopped at once it is likely to upset the friendly relations existing between Australia and England.

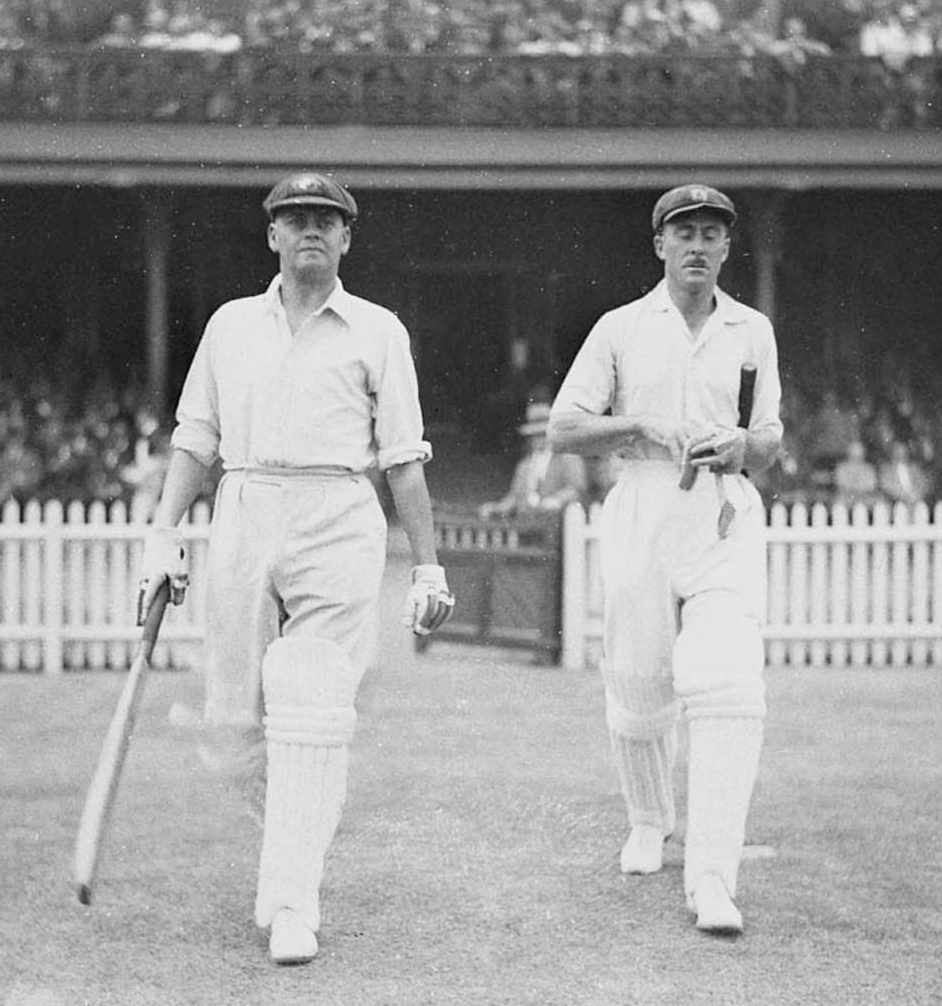
Woodfull (left) walks out to open the batting with Vic Richardson in the final bodyline Test

Jardine threatened to withdraw his team from the Fourth and Fifth Tests unless the Australian Board withdrew the accusation of unsporting behaviour. The MCC backed their captain but offered to abandon the tour. They asked the Australians to propose a law change if they disagreed with the tactics and blamed the batsmen for the injuries. The standoff was settled only when Australian Prime Minister Joseph Lyons warned the Australian Board of the severe economic hardships that could result if the British public boycotted Australian trade. Given this understanding, the Board withdrew the allegation of unsportsmanlike behaviour two days before the Fourth Test, thus saving the tour.

In the meantime, the second innings in Adelaide saw England set Australia a near-impossible 532 for victory; even today, the highest successful Test run chase is 418. Australia lost its first wicket at three when Jack Fingleton was bowled by Larwood. Woodfull was joined by Bradman, who played in an unorthodox counterattacking method, before being dismissed for 66. Woodfull continued on to score an unbeaten 73, carrying his bat as his teammates capitulated around him. Australia was eventually all out for 193, with Oldfield unable to bat due to his fractured skull.

== See also ==
- Adelaide leak
