= Adelaide leak =

Cricket scandal

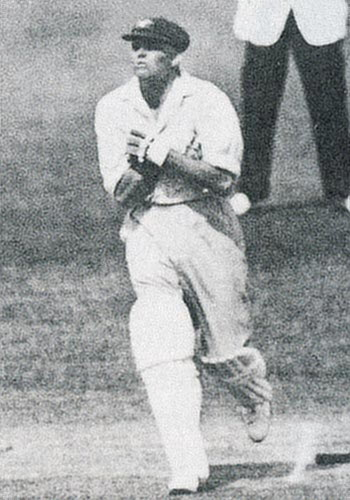
Bill Woodfull struck over the heart by a Harold Larwood delivery

The Adelaide leak was the revelation to the press of a dressing-room incident during the third Test, a cricket match played during the 1932–33 Ashes series between Australia and England at the Adelaide Oval, more commonly known as the Bodyline series. During the course of play on 14 January 1933, the Australian Test captain Bill Woodfull was struck over the heart by a ball delivered by Harold Larwood. Although not badly hurt, Woodfull was shaken and dismissed shortly afterwards. On his return to the Australian dressing room, Woodfull was visited by the managers of the Marylebone Cricket Club (MCC) team, Pelham Warner and Richard Palairet. Warner enquired after Woodfull's health, but the latter dismissed his concerns in a brusque fashion. He said he did not want to speak to the Englishman owing to the Bodyline tactics England were using, leaving Warner embarrassed and shaken. The matter became public knowledge when someone present leaked the exchange to the press and it was widely reported on 16 January. Such leaks to the press were practically unknown at the time, and the players were horrified that the confrontation became public knowledge.

In the immediate aftermath, many people assumed Jack Fingleton, the only full-time journalist on either team, was responsible. This belief may have affected the course of his subsequent career. Fingleton later wrote that Donald Bradman, Australia's star batsman and the primary target of Bodyline, was the person who disclosed the story. Bradman always denied this, and continued to blame Fingleton; animosity between the pair continued for the rest of their lives. Woodfull's earlier public silence on the tactics had been interpreted as approval; the leak was significant in persuading the Australian public that Bodyline was unacceptable.

== Background ==
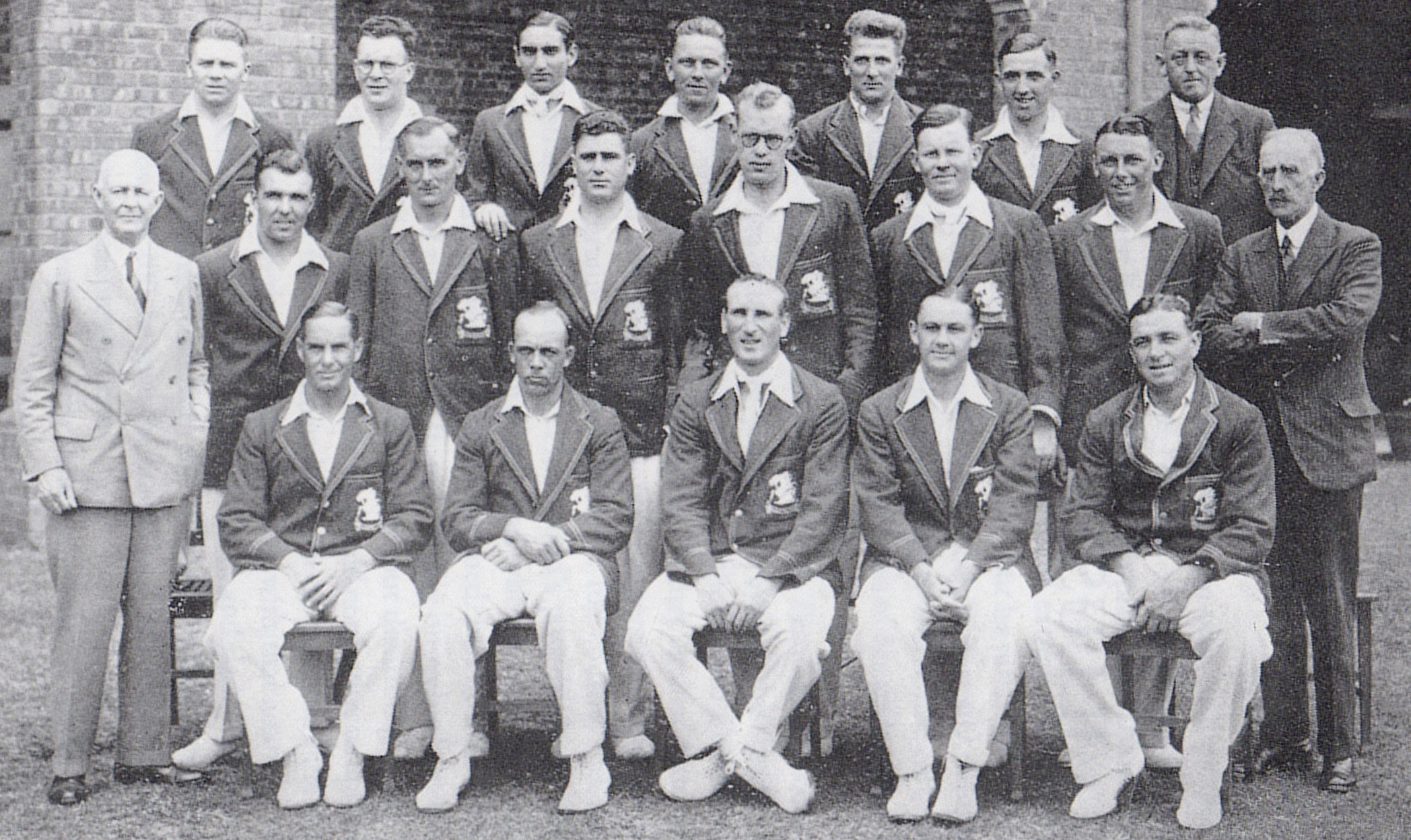
A team photograph of England's 1932–33 side: Jardine is seated at the centre of the front row; Pelham Warner is standing at the extreme left, Richard Palairet at the extreme right.

In 1932–33 the English team, led by Douglas Jardine and jointly managed by Pelham Warner and Richard Palairet, toured Australia and won the Ashes in an acrimonious contest that became known as the Bodyline series. The English team used contentious bowling tactics where the English pace bowlers Harold Larwood, Bill Voce and Bill Bowes bowled the ball roughly on the line of leg stump. The deliveries were often short-pitched, designed to rise at the batsman's body, with four or five fielders close by on the leg side waiting to catch deflections off the bat. Intended to be intimidating, the tactics proved difficult for batsmen to counter and were physically threatening. The primary target of Bodyline was Donald Bradman, who had overwhelmed the English bowling in the 1930 Ashes series. Leading English cricketers and administrators feared that Bradman would be unstoppable on good Australian batting wickets in 1932–33, and looked for possible weaknesses in his batting technique.

Following Jardine's appointment as England captain in July 1932, he developed a plan based on his belief that Bradman was weak against bowling directed at leg stump and that if this line of attack could be maintained, it would restrict Bradman's scoring to one side of the field, giving the bowlers greater control of his scoring. In a meeting, he outlined his plan to Larwood and Voce, who tried out the tactic in the remainder of the season with mixed success. Both Nottinghamshire fast bowlers were selected to tour, as was Yorkshire bowler Bill Bowes who had tried similar tactics at the end of the season. In one match, he bowled short at Jack Hobbs; in his capacity as cricket correspondent of The Morning Post, Warner was highly critical of the Yorkshire bowlers and Bowes in particular. These remarks were seized upon by Australian opponents of Bodyline in the coming months. A fourth fast bowler, Middlesex amateur Gubby Allen, was later added to the tour. The selection of this many pace bowlers was unusual at the time, drawing comment from Australian writers, including Bradman.

In Australia, while Jardine's unfriendly approach and superior manner caused some friction with the press and spectators, the early tour matches were uncontroversial and Larwood and Voce had a light workload in preparation for the Test series. The first signs of trouble came in the match against a representative "Australian XI" at near full strength, in which the bowlers first used Bodyline tactics. Under the captaincy of Bob Wyatt (Jardine having rested from the match), the England attack bowled short and around leg stump, with fielders positioned close by on the leg side to catch any deflections. Wyatt later claimed this was not pre-planned and he simply informed Jardine what had happened. The Bodyline tactics continued in the next match and several players, including Jack Fingleton, were hit. The Australian press were shocked and criticised the hostility of Larwood in particular. Some former Australian players joined the criticism, saying the tactics were ethically wrong. However, at this stage, not everyone was opposed, and the Australian Board of Control believed the English team had bowled fairly. On the other hand, Jardine increasingly came into disagreement with tour manager Warner over Bodyline as the tour progressed. Warner hated Bodyline but would not speak out against it. He was accused of hypocrisy for not taking a stand on either side, particularly after expressing sentiments at the start of the tour that cricket "has become a synonym for all that is true and honest. To say 'that is not cricket' implies something underhand, something not in keeping with the best ideals ... all who love it as players, as officials or spectators must be careful lest anything they do should do it harm."

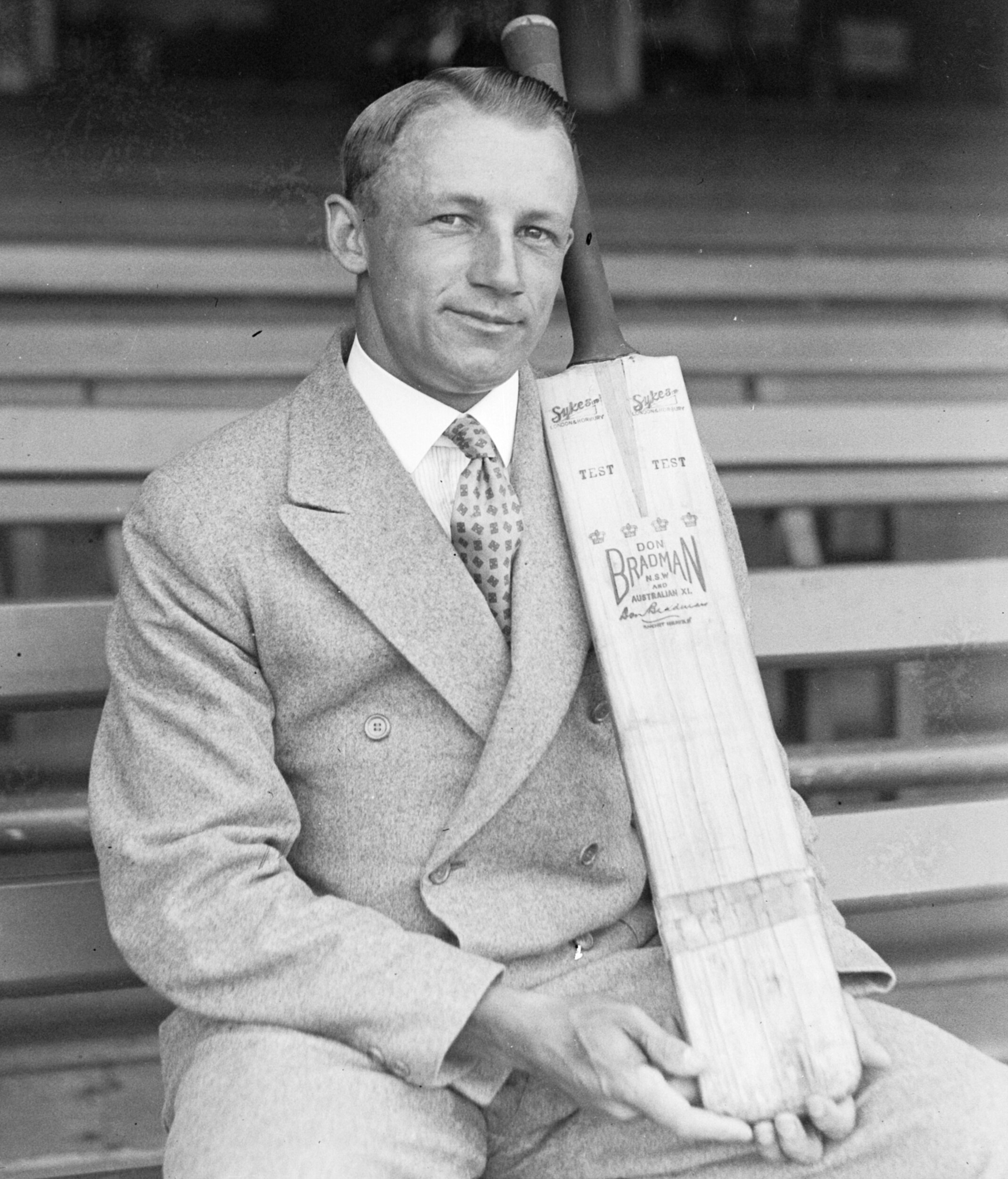
Donald Bradman, the target of Bodyline and a suspect for the leak

Jardine's tactics were successful in one respect: in six innings against the tourists ahead of the Tests, Bradman scored only 103 runs, causing concern among the Australian public who expected much more from him. At the time, Bradman was in dispute with the Board of Control, who would not allow players to write in newspapers unless journalism was their full-time profession; Bradman, although not a journalist, had a contract to write for the Sydney Sun. A particular irritation for Bradman was that Jack Fingleton, a full-time journalist, was allowed to write for the Telegraph Pictorial, although he required permission from the Board to write about cricket. Bradman threatened to withdraw from the team unless the Board allowed him to write. Fingleton and Bradman were openly hostile towards each other. From their first meeting while playing together for New South Wales, they disliked each other. Fingleton, conscious that Bradman's self-possession and solitary nature made him unpopular with some teammates, kept his distance after a dressing room argument, while Bradman believed the more popular Fingleton had tried to turn the team against him. Later hostility arose from Bradman's public preference for Bill Brown as a batsman, which Fingleton believed cost him a place on the 1934 tour of England. Fingleton's writings on the Bodyline series further soured the relationship. Bradman believed some of the differences stemmed from religion; Fingleton was a Roman Catholic, Bradman an Anglican.

Bradman missed the first Test, worn out by constant cricket and the ongoing argument with the Board of Control. The English bowlers used Bodyline intermittently in the first match, to the crowd's vocal displeasure. Behind the scenes, administrators began to express concerns to each other. Yet the English tactics still did not earn universal disapproval; former Australian captain Monty Noble praised the English bowling. For the second Test, Bradman returned to the team after his newspaper employers released him from his contract. England continued to use Bodyline and Bradman was dismissed by his first ball in the first innings. In the second innings, against the full Bodyline attack, he scored an unbeaten century which helped Australia to win the match and level the series at one match each. Critics began to believe Bodyline was not quite the threat that had been perceived and Bradman's reputation, which had suffered slightly with his earlier failures, was restored. However, the pitch was slightly slower than others in the series, and Larwood was suffering from problems with his boots which reduced his effectiveness. Meanwhile, Woodfull was being encouraged to retaliate to the short-pitched English attack, not least by members of his own side such as Vic Richardson, but refused to consider doing so.

== Warner–Woodfull incident ==
=== Woodfull's injury ===
During the mid-afternoon of Saturday 14 January 1933, the second day of the Third Test, Woodfull and Fingleton opened the batting for Australia in the face of an England total of 341 before a record attendance of 50,962 people. Fingleton was caught by the wicketkeeper without scoring. The third over of the innings was bowled by Larwood with fielders still in orthodox positions. The fifth ball narrowly missed Woodfull's head and the final ball, delivered short on the line of middle stump, struck Woodfull over the heart. The batsman dropped his bat and staggered away holding his chest, bent over in pain. The England players surrounded Woodfull to offer sympathy but the crowd began to protest noisily. Jardine called to Larwood: "Well bowled, Harold!" Although the comment was aimed at unnerving Bradman, who was also batting at the time, Woodfull was appalled. Play resumed after a brief delay, once it was certain the Australian captain was fit to carry on, and since Larwood's over had ended, Woodfull did not have to face the bowling of Allen in the next over. However, when Larwood was ready to bowl at Woodfull again, play was halted once more when the fielders were moved into Bodyline positions, causing the crowd to protest and call abuse at the England team. Subsequently, Jardine claimed that Larwood requested a field change, Larwood said that Jardine had done so. Many commentators condemned the alteration of the field as unsporting, and the angry spectators became extremely volatile. Jardine, although writing that Woodfull could have retired hurt if he was unfit, later expressed his regret at making the field change at that moment. It is likely Jardine wished to press home his team's advantage in the match, and the Bodyline field was usually employed at this stage of an innings.

Shortly afterwards, a delivery from Larwood knocked Woodfull's bat from his hands and the Australian captain seemed unsettled. Two quick wickets fell before Ponsford joined Woodfull in the middle, but having been struck by short balls several more times, Woodfull was bowled by Allen for 22, having batted for an hour and a half. When a doctor was publicly requested, to attend an injury to Voce, many in the crowd believed it was Woodfull who required assistance, leading to a renewal of protest. In later years, Woodfull's wife believed that his injury at Adelaide was partly responsible for his death aged 67 in 1965.

=== Warner's visit to the dressing room ===
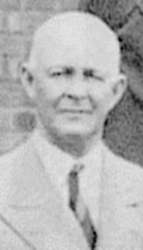
Plum Warner in 1933

Warner learned from twelfth man Leo O'Brien that Woodfull was badly injured. Later in the afternoon, while Ponsford and Richardson were still batting, Warner and Palairet visited the Australian dressing room with the intention of enquiring about Woodfull's health. Accounts vary about what followed. According to the original newspaper reports and Fingleton's later description, Woodfull was lying on the masseur's table, awaiting treatment from a doctor, although this may have been an exaggeration for dramatic effect. Leo O'Brien described Woodfull as wearing a towel around his waist, having showered. Warner expressed sympathy to Woodfull but was surprised by the Australian's response. According to Warner, Woodfull replied, "I don't want to see you, Mr Warner. There are two teams out there. One is trying to play cricket and the other is not." Fingleton wrote that Woodfull had added, "This game is too good to be spoilt. It is time some people got out of it." Woodfull was usually dignified and quietly spoken, making his reaction surprising to Warner and others present. Warner recalled saying, "Apart from all that, we most sincerely hope you are not too badly hurt," to which Woodfull replied, "The bruise is coming out." Embarrassed and humiliated, Warner and Palairet turned and left. Fingleton noted that Woodfull spoke quietly and calmly, which increased the effectiveness of his words. He also pointed out that Warner prided himself on sportsmanship, so an accusation of "not playing cricket" would have stung the Englishman. Warner was so shaken that he was found in tears later that day in his hotel room.

According to O'Brien, only he, Woodfull, the masseur (who was deaf), Alan Kippax, and former Australian Test players Jack Ryder and Ernie Jones were present when the incident took place, but most of the Australian team were watching the match from a balcony adjoining the dressing room from where they would have been able to hear the confrontation. O'Brien claimed that he went outside and told the group what had happened; around twenty people were present.

Later that afternoon, Warner related the incident to Jardine, who replied that he "couldn't care less". The England captain then locked the dressing room doors and told the team what Woodfull had said and warned them not to speak to anyone concerning the matter. Warner later wrote to his wife that Woodfull had made "a complete fool of himself" and had been "fanning the flames".

== Leak ==
Sunday being a rest day, there was no play. On Monday, the exchange between Warner and Woodfull was reported in several newspapers along with the description of Woodfull's injury. Most headlines were variations on "Woodfull Protests", and the most extensive accounts were by Claude Corbett in The Sun and The Daily Telegraph. He wrote in the Telegraph that the "fires which have been smouldering in the ranks of the Australian Test cricketers regarding the English shock attack suddenly burst into flames yesterday." Another newspaper, The Advertiser of Adelaide, claimed several members of the Australian team had repeated the story.

The players and officials were horrified that a sensitive private exchange had been reported to the press. Leaks to the press were practically unknown in 1933. David Frith notes that discretion and respect were highly prized and such a leak was "regarded as a moral offence of the first order." Woodfull made it clear that he severely disapproved of the leak, and later wrote that he "always expected cricketers to do the right thing by their team-mates." As the only full-time journalist in the Australian team, suspicion immediately fell on Fingleton, although as soon as the story was published, he told Woodfull he was not responsible. Warner offered Larwood a reward of one pound if he could dismiss Fingleton in the second innings; Larwood obliged by bowling him for a duck.

Later, Warner issued a statement to the press that Woodfull had apologised for the incident and that "we are now the best of friends". Woodfull denied through Bill Jeanes, the Secretary of the Australian Board of Control, that he had expressed regret, but he had said there was no personal animosity between the two men.

=== Suspects ===
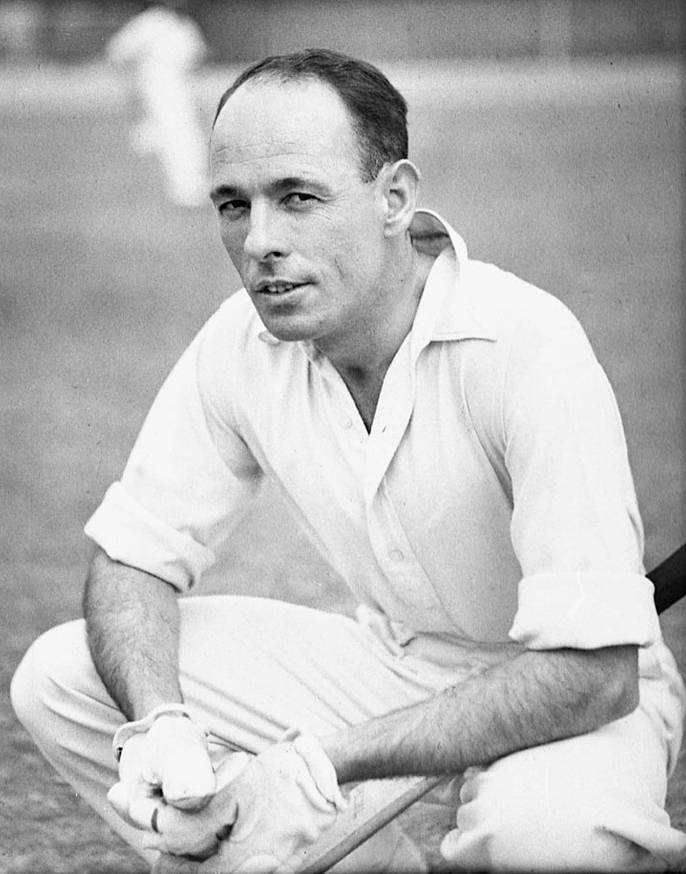
Jack Fingleton, whom many believed to be responsible for the Adelaide leak

Until he read Warner's Cricket Between Two Wars during the Second World War, Fingleton was unaware that Warner assumed he was responsible for the leak. When he found out, Fingleton wrote to Warner, who replied that although he believed Fingleton to be the source, he would publish a correction if presented with evidence to the contrary. Fingleton did not pursue the case. Australian cricketer Bill O'Reilly wrote that during the 1948 tour of England, he and Fingleton confronted Warner, who apologised as he no longer believed Fingleton to be the culprit. Fingleton thought the belief he was responsible cost him a place on the 1934 tour to England, although there were other possible factors in his exclusion. According to Fingleton, Woodfull later told him that the controversy had led to his missing selection. A letter which Woodfull wrote to Fingleton in 1943 stated "I can assure you that I did not connect your name with the passing on of that conversation."

In his 1978 biography of Victor Trumper, Fingleton accused Bradman of relating Woodfull's words to the press. Fingleton claimed that Claude Corbett revealed the information to him. In Fingleton's version of events, Bradman telephoned Corbett during the night to arrange a meeting. Bradman wrote for Corbett's paper, Sydney's Sun. Sitting in Corbett's car, Bradman told the journalist about the Warner–Woodfull incident. Corbett considered the story too important to keep to himself, so shared it with other journalists. Fingleton later added that "Bradman would have saved me a lot of backlash ... had he admitted that he had given the leak. Part of his job was writing for the Sydney Sun and he had every right to leak such a vital story."

Bradman denied this version of events. In 1983, two years after Fingleton's death, a book written by Michael Page, with Bradman's close co-operation, blamed Fingleton for the leak and dismissed Fingleton's story concerning Bradman and Corbett as "an absurd fabrication", arising from a grudge against Bradman. The book pointed out that Fingleton only made the accusation after Corbett's death. Fingleton's executor, Malcolm Gemmell, summarised the evidence which supported Fingleton's accusation in a magazine article: that Bradman wrote for the Sun, was the prime target of Bodyline, and had previously urged the Australian Board of Control to object to the tactic. Fingleton's brother supported the claim that Bradman was responsible, repeating in 1997 the alleged view of Corbett that Bradman provided the information. In 1995, Bradman was interviewed for television, and when asked about the source of the leak, responded sharply: "It wasn't me!" In the same year, a biography of Bradman, written with his close co-operation, by Roland Perry, said that Bradman had confronted Corbett to ask who leaked the story, to be told it was Fingleton.

O'Reilly believed that Bradman, with whom he did not get along, was responsible, wishing to expose the English bowling he believed was designed to cause him physical injury. He also said Bradman was an expert at diverting blame. Cricket writer Ray Robinson wrote that many of the Australian team did not blame Fingleton, and they knew who met Corbett. In the early 1980s another journalist, Michael Davie, interviewed Ponsford who said that Woodfull never forgave Bradman for "a couple of things". Davie suggests that one of these may have been leaking the Adelaide story.

Gilbert Mant, a journalist who covered the tour, investigated the leak in the mid-1990s. He died in 1997, but had arranged for a summary of his findings to be sent to David Frith with a request not to publish the information before Bradman died. Mant believed the leak was not a serious crime and pointed out that any of the players except Ponsford and Richardson, who were batting at the time Warner entered the dressing room, could have leaked the story. Bradman, in correspondence with Mant in 1992, continued to blame Fingleton and would never forgive the "dastardly lie he concocted about me" and hoped Mant could clear Bradman's name. As part of his investigations, Mant contacted Corbett's family. Corbett died in 1944, and his son Mac said he never mentioned the leak. However, his daughter Helen related that Corbett had spoken to his wife about the affair. She had told Helen that Corbett had received the information from Bradman. Mant believed that while Corbett may have played a joke on Fingleton in naming the culprit, he would not have done so with his wife.

=== Aftermath ===
Many commentators and cricketers deplored the use of Bodyline bowling. Some felt frustration that Woodfull had not publicly condemned the tactics, believing that his silence was interpreted as approval. Once his opinions were revealed by the leak, opponents of Bodyline felt publicly legitimised and expressed their opinions more freely. It also revealed deep and unaccustomed divisions between the teams which had been kept from view. The leak and subsequent events in the same match brought varied opinions from journalists and former players on Bodyline into the newspapers, both for and against Bodyline tactics.

During the play on Monday, a short ball from Larwood fractured Bert Oldfield's skull, although Bodyline tactics were not being used at the time. The Australian Board of Control contacted the MCC managers Warner and Palairet asking them to arrange for the team to cease the use of Bodyline, but they replied the captain was solely in charge of the playing side of the tour. On the Wednesday of the game, the Australian Board sent a cable to the MCC which stated "Bodyline bowling has assumed such proportions as to menace the best interests of the game, making protection of the body by the batsman the main consideration. This is causing intensely bitter feeling between the players, as well as injury. In our opinion it is unsportsmanlike. Unless stopped at once it is likely to upset the friendly relations existing between Australia and England." After England's victory in the match, Jardine went to the Australian dressing room but had the door closed in his face. Speaking to his team, Jardine offered to end the use of the tactics if the players opposed them, but they unanimously voted to continue. The report in Wisden Cricketers' Almanack stated it was probably the most unpleasant match ever played.

Jardine threatened to withdraw his team from the Fourth and Fifth Tests unless the Australian Board retracted the accusation of unsporting behaviour. The MCC responded angrily to the accusations of unsporting conduct, played down the Australian claims about the danger of Bodyline and threatened to call off the tour. The series had become a major diplomatic incident by this stage, and many people saw Bodyline as damaging to an international relationship that needed to remain strong. The public in both England and Australia reacted with outrage towards the other nation. Alexander Hore-Ruthven, the Governor of South Australia, who was in England at the time, expressed his concern to J. H. Thomas, the British Secretary of State for Dominion Affairs that this would cause a significant impact on trade between the nations. The standoff was settled only when Australian Prime Minister Joseph Lyons met members of the Australian Board and outlined to them the severe economic hardships that could be caused in Australia if the British public boycotted Australian trade. Given this understanding, the Board withdrew the allegation of unsportsmanlike behaviour two days before the fourth Test, thus saving the tour. However, correspondence continued for almost a year. Fingleton was dropped after scoring a pair in the third Test, and England won the final two matches to win the series 4–1.
