= Claude Corbett =

Australian sports journalist (1885–1944)

Claude Gordon Corbett (1885–1944) was an Australian sporting journalist and was the sporting editor for Sydney's Sun newspaper in the early twentieth century.

== Early life ==
Claude Corbett was born in Waterloo, New South Wales in 1885 and was the son of another noted Sydney journalist, William Francis Corbett. He also played first-grade rugby for St George, Newtown and Eastern Suburbs. His career in journalism began at The Evening News as a copyboy in 1899, aged 14.

== Sports journalist ==
He was initially a journalist at The Daily Telegraph in 1911. During his career he covered three Kangaroo Tours to England. He was managing director of The Sunday Times, The Referee and the Arrow and was the leading Rugby League and Cricket journalist of his era. Colbert joined The Sun and The Sun-Herald as the Sports Director in 1923, and retained that position until his death in 1944. He was, for many years, a resident of Ocean Street, Bondi Beach, New South Wales.

As a journalist he was involved in the Bodyline controversy, and was responsible for reporting the story of Bill Woodfull's confrontation with Pelham Warner which was leaked during the third Test. A memorial trophy awarded at Anglo-Australian Test matches held in Australia is named after him. His brother, Harold Corbett also played for Eastern Suburbs and later died on the Western Front during World War I. Claude's grandson was the esteemed Australian journalist Peter Harvey.

== Death ==
Claude Corbett died of cancer on 12 December 1944, age 59. His funeral was very well attended and he was buried at Waverley Cemetery.

== Accolades ==
Noted Australian poet, Kenneth Slessor, wrote of Claude Corbett: "he not only has a specialist's knowledge, but also had a crisp, magnetic style that fascinated readers."

The Claude Corbett Shield was presented at Sydney Rugby League Tests between Australia and England commemorates his memory.

Claude Corbett was also a life member of the New South Wales Rugby League (NSWRFL).

Corbett Place, in the Canberra suburb of Gilmore, is named jointly in his and his father's honour.
