= Bill Woodfull =

Australian cricketer (1897–1965)

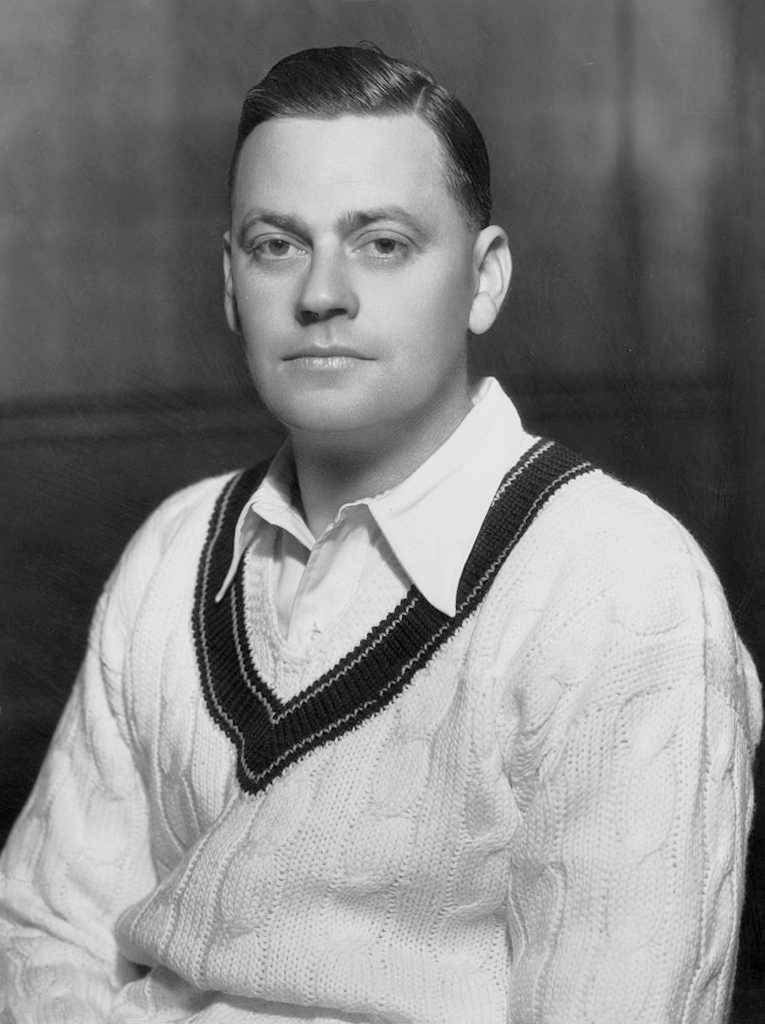
- Woodfull in 1934

Personal information
- Full name: William Maldon Woodfull
- Born: 22 August 1897; Maldon, Colony of Victoria
- Died: 11 August 1965 (aged 67); Tweed Heads, New South Wales, Australia
- Nickname: The Unbowlable; Rock of Gibraltar; Wormkiller; Old Steadfast
- Height: 1.80 m (5 ft 11 in)
- Batting: Right-handed
- Role: Opening batsman

International information
- National side: Australia (1926–1934)
- Test debut (cap 123): 12 June 1926 v England
- Last Test: 22 August 1934 v England

Domestic team information
- Years: Team
- 1922–1934: Victoria

Career statistics
Competition	Test	FC
Matches	35	174
Runs scored	2,300	13,388
Batting average	46.00	64.99
100s/50s	7/13	49/58
Top score	161	284
Balls bowled	0	26
Wickets	–	1
Bowling average	–	24.00
5 wickets in innings	–	0
10 wickets in match	–	0
Best bowling	–	1/12
Catches/stumpings	7/0	78/0
- Source: CricketArchive, 29 February 2008

William Maldon Woodfull OBE (22 August 1897 – 11 August 1965) was an Australian cricketer of the 1920s and 1930s. He captained both Victoria and Australia, and was best known for his dignified and moral conduct during the tumultuous bodyline series in 1932–33. Trained as a schoolteacher, Woodfull was known for his benevolent attitude towards his players, and his patience and defensive technique as an opening batsman. His opening pairing with fellow Victorian Bill Ponsford for both his state and Australia remains one of the most successful in history. While not known for his tactical skills, Woodfull was widely admired by his players and observers for his sportsmanship and ability to mould a successful and loyal team through the strength of his character.

Woodfull started playing cricket from a young age. He made his professional debut in Melbourne's district competition staying until the age of 19. He made his first-class debut for Victoria at the age of 24 late in 1921–22. After scoring a century in his second match, Woodfull was promoted to open the following season, and he opened for the rest of his career. After scoring three centuries, including a 236, in 1925–26, he was selected for the 1926 tour of England. Woodfull made eight centuries during the tour and topped the Australian averages and was named one of the five Wisden Cricketers of the Year.

Upon returning to Australia, Woodfull established his partnership with Ponsford, and in 1926–27 Shield season, they put on a record-breaking 375-run opening stand, setting up a world record first-class team score of 1107. Woodfull was appointed as vice-captain to Jack Ryder for the 1928–29 home Ashes series. He carried his bat in a record-breaking first Test defeat. Although England easily won 4–1, Woodfull scored three centuries, and added his best first-class score for 275 not out. Woodfull reluctantly became captain in 1930 when Ryder was dropped, and his team was derided as the worst Australian squad to tour England. It was the youngest squad to leave Australia, prompting commentators to label the team "Woodfull's kindegarten". After losing the first Test, Woodfull scored a century as Australia levelled the series and they won the fifth Test to regain the Ashes. Woodfull ended the tour with six first-class centuries. In 1931–32 Woodfull had his most successful Test series in his career, against South Africa, scoring 421 runs at 70.17, including his Test highest score of 161.

In 1932–33, controversy erupted during England's tour of Australia. The visitors used bodyline tactics—persistently aiming at the upper bodies and heads of the Australian batsmen in the hope of stifling the hosts' strong batting line-up. The Australian public and cricket community abhorred the tactic, but Woodfull refused to retaliate or complain publicly. The controversy peaked during the third Test at the Adelaide Oval. Woodfull was felled by a blow to the heart, almost provoking a riot. After Woodfull was dismissed, English manager Plum Warner came to privately express his sympathy, to which Woodfull famously replied "I do not want to see you, Mr Warner. There are two teams out there. One is playing cricket and the other is not." England completed a convincing 4–1 victory, but Woodfull was much praised for his stoic public behaviour. In 1934, Woodfull led the Australians back to England for a tour that was to mend relations. The Australians won 2–1, and Woodfull remains the only captain to regain the Ashes twice. Woodfull retired after the tour. A mathematics teacher, he went on to become headmaster at his alma mater, Melbourne High School.

== Style ==
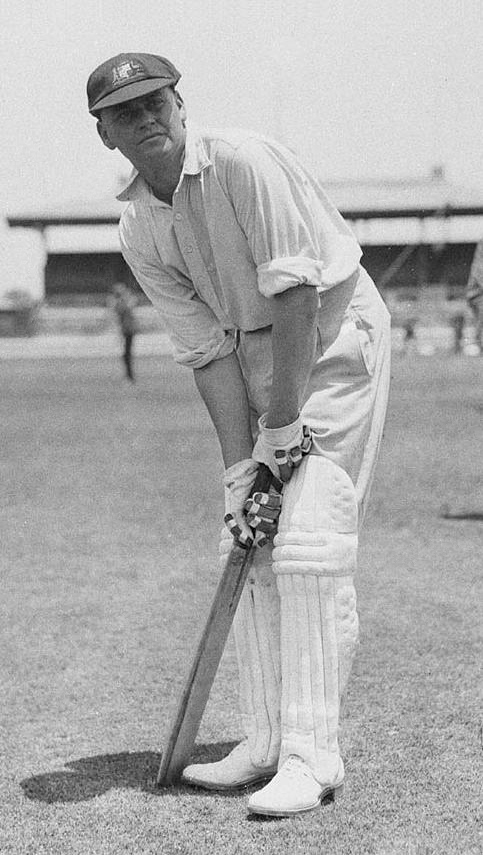
Woodfull's batting stance

Woodfull batted in a manner which had little aesthetic pleasure or grace, with Wisden describing stating that "at first sight, he gave the impression of being clumsy". Affected by a bout of rheumatic fever in childhood, he had stiff-jointed style, and played with little noticeable backlift. This gave the impression of a laboured playing style. Despite this, he scored consistently through good placement and powerful drives generated by his strong forearms. Despite his leaden appearance, he often advanced down the pitch to spin bowling. He was known for playing with a straight bat and a close watch on the ball, which were the core features of a strong defensive ability. He typically took block on leg stump and shuffled across to cover his stumps. His defensive prowess yielded names such as "the unbowlable" (a reference to the fact that he was rarely bowled as a result of missing the ball) and "wormkiller". The latter epithet was given to him by English bowlers who said that his backlift was so small that it was only enough to decapitate worms that had raised their heads above ground level. He was also known for his reliability in crisis match situations, leading to epithets such as "The Rock" and "Old Steadfast". Woodfull formed an opening partnership with Bill Ponsford at state and international level which yielded 18 century opening stands. Dubbed "Mutt and Jeff" by teammates after the famous comic strip duo, as well as "Willy Wo and Willy Po", they were regarded as one of the finest opening partnerships in Test history. Their Victorian teammates had such faith in the pair that if they were batting, the wicket-keeper and bowlers who batted low in the order would leave the ground to go to work.

As a captain, Woodfull was known for his courage and high moral principles in the face of the bodyline series. Fellow player Stan McCabe described him as "the greatest man I ever met", while wicket-keeper Bert Oldfield said that he had never met a more exemplary character. Oldfield said that Woodfull was a psychologist and humanitarian in addition to a captain. Bradman attributed Woodfull's success to his ability to command the intense loyalty of his players and convert it into team spirit. Bill O'Reilly said that Woodfull's men "all held imperishable memories of his personal touch and his courage". Ray Robinson said that "nobody thought Bill Woodfull the cat's whiskers as a strokeplayer but his many qualities made him a pre-eminent leader of men". He added that "Woodfull's unrivalled selflessness won fidelity bordering on devotion". Australian cricket writer Jack Pollard said that "Woodfull had the habit of being where things were tough, and he brought rare dignity to the Australian captaincy". Pollard compared the respect he commanded from his players to that of Ian Chappell. The English writer RC Robertson-Glasgow said of Woodfull:

The most calm-browed cricketer I have seen. He reminded me of a master who gets the whole school to and from a picnic without losing his reason or a boy. Of all the protagonists in that fiercest controversy [bodyline], I should say that he alone came out of it with reputation heightened and personal friendships increased. He neither concealed nor exaggerated a difficulty.

Woodfull was known for his gentlemanly nature and his adherence to the spirit of the game. Aside from refusing to retaliate against bodyline, Woodfull refused to exploit loopholes to dismiss batsmen. On one occasion, Jack Fingleton was run out after wandering out of the crease to inspect the pitch, without intending to run. A teammate broke the wicket and the umpire upheld the appeal, but Woodfull called Fingleton back. He led his team in an understated way, preferring to give broad objectives to his players and trusting them to choose their own methods to fulfil the task at hand. However, he was known to organise his team tightly on tour to ensure that things proceeded smoothly.

Although Woodfull was a devout Methodist, he would show a deep concern in the personal welfare of all players, which extended to finding the location of the nearest Catholic Church for those teammates who followed the religion. At the time, Australian society at large was divided along Catholic-Protestant lines, and while O'Reilly and McCabe were full of praise for Woodfull, they were later accused of leading a Catholic revolt against the leadership of the Protestant Bradman during a divisive period in the late-1930s. While Woodfull himself never touched alcohol due to his strict adherence to his religious principles, he did not impose his beliefs on his team. He would buy drinks for his players, and ask administrators to provide more alcohol for his teammates when they were exhausted. At the time, cricketers widely regarded beer as a highly effective means of rehydration, and on one occasion Woodfull threatened to halt play when administrators refused his players more ale on the grounds that they had already consumed their quota.

== Early years ==
Born in the central Victorian town of Maldon, Woodfull was the third of four sons of Gertrude Lilian (Abey) Woodfull (1872–1941) and Rev. Thomas Staines Brittingham Woodfull (1863–1941), a Methodist preacher. The Woodfulls moved to Melbourne when Thomas was given a transfer to Collingwood Methodist Mission, in an inner city suburb. The religious traditionalism stayed with the younger Woodfull throughout his life. He once refused to play an interstate match that was scheduled for Christmas Day. Woodfull's father installed a net in the backyard and taught him the emphasis on defensive technique and patience that were to become his hallmark. Woodfull attended Melbourne High School and his early career was unremarkable. He made his district cricket debut in 1916 for Essendon, at the age of 19, but did not distinguish himself. He played no further cricket at that level before he gained his qualification as a schoolteacher in 1919. Because of a bout of rheumatic fever in childhood, Woodfull had stiff muscles and as a result was rejected when he tried to join the First Australian Imperial Force to fight in World War I. He was posted to Maryborough High School, and it was in the rural cricket competition that he began to gain attention. In 1920 and 1921, he accumulated 1,335 runs at average of 225.83 in the local competition.

When the England cricket team toured Australia in 1920–21, Woodfull played for a Ballarat XV, and scored 50 and 1. A teaching transfer in 1921 saw him return to Melbourne, where the Victorian selectors trialled him in Second XI fixtures during the 1921–22 season. In two matches against South Australia and New South Wales, he registered unbeaten scores of 186 and 227 respectively. At the time, Victoria had so much depth that their Second XI was of comparable strength to the first-choice teams from other states.

In early 1922, he made his Sheffield Shield debut against South Australia at the Adelaide Oval. He batted at No. 8 and made an unbeaten 22. Batting at No. 7 in his second match against Western Australia, Woodfull registered his maiden first-class century with 153. He was run out in his second and final innings of his debut first-class season, so he was yet to be dismissed by a bowler. Both matches were won by an innings, part of a dominant summer for the Victorians. During this time, he also studied for an arts degree at night in addition to his post at Williamstown High School.

The following season, Woodfull was promoted to open and his consistent performances in all conditions meant that he was to play there for the rest of his career. Between 1922 and 1926, he accumulated over 3,000 first-class runs at an average of 67.

In the first match of the 1922–23 season, Woodfull scored 74 run out and four not out as Victoria scraped past the Marylebone Cricket Club by two wickets. The next match against New South Wales was Woodfull's first against Victoria's arch-rivals. Woodfull made 47 in the first innings before being dismissed by Test leg spinner Arthur Mailey. After exactly 300 first-class runs, a bowler had dismissed him for the first time. He then made an unbeaten 84 to steer his team to a seven-wicket victory. He showed a liking for the South Australian bowlers, scoring 0, 115, 123 and 94 not out as Victoria won both of their matches against the aforementioned team. He ended his first full season with 598 runs at 74.75. Despite this, Victoria lost the Sheffield Shield to New South Wales on scoring difference; both teams had finished equal on points.

He played in each match for the Victorian Sheffield Shield team in the 1923–24 season, when he scored 300 runs at 37.50, including a 117 against New South Wales. Victoria won all five of their matches and took the title.

In a match against New South Wales in 1924–25, he compiled 81 and 120 not out as Victoria managed to take a seven-wicket win after their opponents had accumulated 614 in the first innings. He scored fifties in each of the four other matches, three of which were won. Woodfull ended the Australian season with 494 runs at 61.75. Woodfull was nevertheless omitted for selection in the Tests against the touring England team. As a reward for winning the Sheffield Shield, Victoria embarked on a tour of New Zealand at the end of the season. Woodfull scored 212 not out against Canterbury, before scoring 110, 50 and 150 against New Zealand without being dismissed at all. The unbeaten 150 was achieved on a sticky wicket. He ended the tour with 706 runs at 176.50. In one two-year period, Woodfull's defence was so solid that he was never bowled.

During the 1925–26 season, players were vying for selection for the 1926 Ashes tour. The selectors were interested in Woodfull and selected him for an Australian XI to play the Rest of Australia in a Test trial. He made 11 and 42 as The Rest upset the Australian XI. After three matches without passing 53, Woodfull added 97 and 236 in a match against South Australia. He scored 126 in the next match, but was unable to stop an innings defeat to New South Wales for the second time in the season.

As a result of consistent performances for Victoria, Woodfull was selected for Herbie Collins' Test team for the 1926 Ashes tour. He scored 148 and 64 as the Australians defeated Tasmania by an innings in consecutive matches before sailing for England. He ended the Australian season with 890 runs at 63.57.

== Test debut ==
Despite being regarded as the last man picked for the tour, Woodfull headed the batting averages in the first-class matches and was third in the Tests.

In his first two first-class innings on tour, Woodfull struck a 201 against Essex at Leyton and a 118 against Surrey at The Oval. Both were made on damp pitches, with the double century coming in only four hours of batting. Woodfull's effort was the only double century by an Australian during the tour. They were the first of eight centuries during the tour, in which he compiled 1809 runs at 58.35.

After making a duck against the Marylebone Cricket Club, which was a dress rehearsal for the Tests as the MCC fielded a virtual England team, Woodfull scored an unbeaten 98 against Cambridge University before running out of partners. He added 69 against the South of England and 100 against Middlesex and entered the Tests with 653 runs on tour at an average of 59.36.

Woodfull made his debut in the first Test at Trent Bridge, but it was an anti-climax; Australia did not bat in a washed-out match as England reached 0/32 when rain ended play. He failed to make an impression in the second Test at Lord's, scoring 13 and a duck in another drawn match. It capped off an unhappy June for Woodfull; he had scored only 120 runs at 13.33 for the month, with rain interruptions being frequent.

Woodfull then regained his form, striking 102 not out in an innings win over Nottinghamshire. He then established himself as a Test opener in the third Test at Headingley, where Australia were sent in to bat on a sticky wicket with erratic bounce. After opening partner Warren Bardsley was dismissed without scoring from the first ball, Woodfull put on a second wicket partnership of 235 with Charlie Macartney to register his maiden Test century of 141. Macartney launched a vicious counterattack and became the second Australian to score a Test century before lunch on the opening day; this bold play helped Woodfull to settle in and the Australians to seize the initiative on a bowler-friendly surface. The tourists made 494 on the sticky wicket and forced England to follow on, but were unable to finish them off.

After scoring 65 against Lancashire, Woodfull made it back-to-back Test centuries in the fourth Test at Old Trafford with 117, the highest score of the innings. It was another rain-affected draw in a wet summer, Woodfull followed this with 156 in another weather-curtailed match against Surrey.

The first four Tests were drawn, so the fate of the Ashes depended on the fifth Test, which would be timeless. Woodfull could manage only 35 and a duck as Australia lost the Test by 289 runs and thus the Ashes. His 306 runs at 51.00 in the Tests placed him third behind Bardsley and Macartney. In the closing stages of the tour, Woodfull compiled his eighth and final century of the campaign, an unbeaten 116 against an England XI in a drawn match.

Upon his return to Australia, he established his partnership with Bill Ponsford, and in the 1926–27 Shield season, they put on a 375-run opening stand in less than four hours, which laid the foundation for the world record first-class score of 1107 against New South Wales. The stand eclipsed the Sheffield shield record of 298 for the first wicket by Victor Trumper and Reg Duff in 1902–03. Woodfull made 133 and the Victorians won by an innings and 656 runs. He ended the season by scoring 140 and 29 not out as the Australian XI defeated The Rest by seven wickets. He scored two further fifties and ended the season with 483 runs at 69.00 in five matches. He then toured Malaya and Singapore with Bert Oldfield's team during the off-season, scoring three centuries; none of the matches were first-class.

In 1927–28 Australian season, Woodfull played in five matches and was highly productive in the last three. He scored 99 and 191 not out in a victory over New South Wales, before adding 106 in an innings triumph over South Australia. He rounded off the season with 94 and 81 not out in a draw in the return match against New South Wales. He ended the Australian campaign with 645 runs at 129.00. With Ponsford amassing 1217 runs at 152.12, Victoria usually got off to a strong start with the bat, and won the Shield easily.

Woodfull recorded his career best score of 284, compiled in five and a half hours of batting, during a brief tour to New Zealand as part of an Australian XI at the end of the season. He added 184 for the first wicket with Ponsford and 218 for the fourth with Karl Schneider. He scored centuries in the first two matches before adding fifties in the next two. He ended the first-class matches with 781 runs at 130.16.

Woodfull was appointed as vice-captain to Jack Ryder for the 1928–29 home Ashes series. The Australian board had spent a great deal of time arguing over whether Woodfull or Victor Richardson should be Ryder's deputy, before realising that the selectors had omitted the latter. With six members of the team that played in the last Test in 1926 having retired, Australia would field a young and inexperienced team. Woodfull prepared for the Tests with an unbeaten 67 for Victoria in a drawn tour match against Percy Chapman's touring Englishmen.

Woodfull played his first Test on Australian soil in the first Test at Brisbane. He made a duck in the first innings as Australia fell for 122 to concede a 411-run first innings lead. before Australia were forced to chase 742 for victory. Woodfull carried his bat to make an unbeaten 30 as Australia were skittled for 66 on a sticky wicket to lose by a record 675 runs. Woodfull then made 68 to top-score in the first innings of the second Test in Sydney. Australia conceded another mammoth first innings lead, 383. Woodfull then scored his first Test century in Australia, with 111 in the second innings to force the tourists to bat again. Despite this, England scored 2/16 to win the match.

The third Test was Woodfull's first at his home ground in Melbourne, and despite scoring 107 in the second innings, the tourists won by three wickets in front of Test world record crowd. Woodfull made only one and 30 as Australia fell short by 12 runs in the fourth Test in Adelaide, but ended the season on a high.

In a tour match against the Englishmen, Woodfull made 275 not out for Victoria, his highest score for his state. During the match, Woodfull was captain and had agreed with English captain Chapman to vary rules that had been laid by the Australian Board of Control. The two men agreed to cover the pitch throughout the match and to bowl overs of six balls instead of eight. The Australian Board of Control reacted by reprimanding the Victorian Cricket Association. The match was a high-scoring draw.

The teams returned to Melbourne for the fifth Test, where Woodfull scored 102 and 35 in front of his home crowd as Australia won by five wickets. It was the first time that Woodfull had played in a winning Test, after ten matches. He hit three centuries in the series, with 491 runs at 54.56, despite which Australia lost the series 4–1. Woodfull ended the entire season with 854 runs at 85.40.

Woodfull started the 1929–30 Australian season by scoring an unbeaten 100 against the touring MCC, overseeing a successful run-chase. However, his season was cut short in the third match when he suffered a broken hand after being hit by a short ball from Hugh Thurlow in a match against Queensland. Woodfull was forced to retired hurt and recovered just in time for the warm-up matches against Tasmania before the national team headed to England. He had scored 231 runs at 77.00 in five matches during the season.

== Captaincy ==
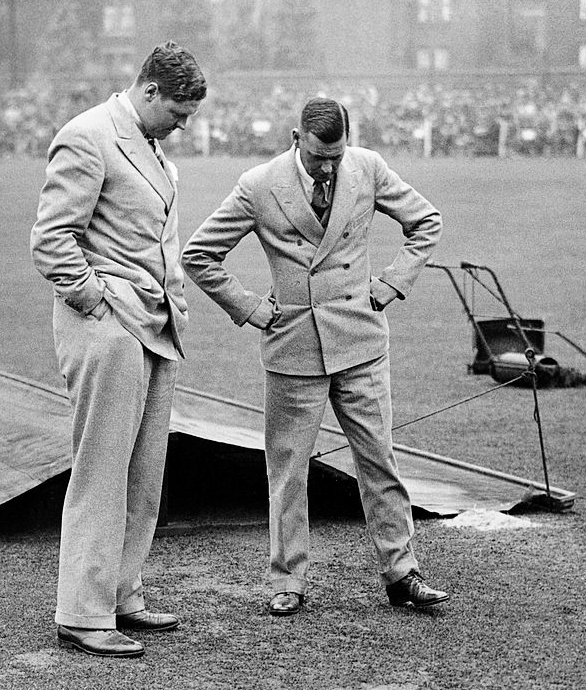
Heavy rain on the third day of the third England-Australia Test at Headingley delayed the match. The team captains Chapman and Woodfull (right) are inspecting the field on 14 July 1930.

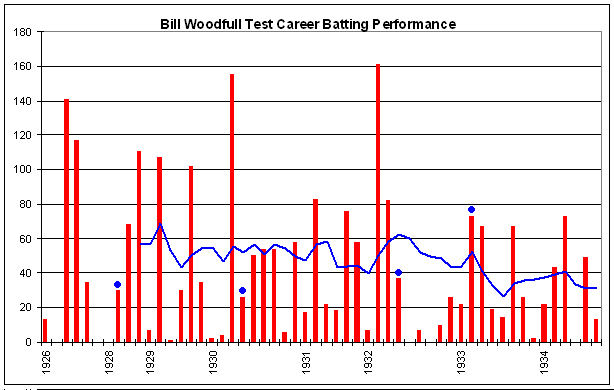
Woodfull's Test career batting performance. The red bars indicate the runs that he scored in an innings, with the blue line indicating the batting average in his last ten innings. The blue dots indicate an innings where he remained not out.

After the heavy 4–1 defeat in the previous Ashes series, captain and fellow Victorian Jack Ryder was omitted altogether from the 1930 Ashes tour, and Woodfull appointed captain. Ryder was one of the three selectors and advocated his own retention, but his two colleagues had voted him off. At first, Woodfull was reluctant to accept the job, feeling that it rightfully belonged to Ryder. When he was informed that Ryder was not even touring, Woodfull only agreed after a ballot was organised. He was unanimously selected by the board. Woodfull had limited leadership experience and in his brief captaincy duties had been the first captain to declare his team's second innings in Shield history.

After winning the vote, Woodfull led the youngest fifteen-man squad to ever tour England, with eleven never having played on English soil. Commentators expected Australia to be easily defeated, being described as "the weakest squad ever to come to these shores". In some quarters, the team was dubbed "Woodfull's kindergarten".

The tour started with a match against Worcestershire, with Woodfull scoring a century and Don Bradman making 236* in 275 minutes. Woodfull's first game in command ended with a resounding innings victory. He added 54 in a win over Essex and scored 121 a drawn match against Yorkshire, the dominant county of the era with many leading Test players. Woodfull then added consecutive fifties in draws against the MCC and Surrey. After consecutive innings wins of Oxford University and Hampshire, Woodfull completed his Test preparation by striking 216 in an innings win over Cambridge University. Heading into the Tests, Woodfull had amassed 662 runs at 66.20. However, concerns over the Australian bowling attack prompted Woodfull and the senior players to ask the board to send another spinner. This was refused.

However, Woodfull's Test captaincy started poorly in the first Test at Trent Bridge; he scored two and four as Australia fell to a 93-run defeat, after losing their last seven wickets for 104. Immediately after, he scored 141 against Surrey.

He set the tone with an opening stand of 162 with fellow Victorian Ponsford in the second Test at Lord's. Ponsford was dismissed immediately after the teams had an audience with King George V. Woodfull then made a 231-run stand with Bradman (254) in only two and a half hours and reached 155. Australia put themselves in control with 6/729 declared. Woodfull was unbeaten on 26 in the second innings as Australia reached 72 to complete a seven-wicket triumph. Woodfull then won the toss for the first time and contributed 50 to a stand of 192 with Bradman in the third Test at Headingley (the match in which Bradman scored 309 in a day). Australia reached 566 but rain helped England to a draw after being forced to follow on. Woodfull scored 54 as the fourth Test was rained out before the second innings. With the series tied at 1–1 the fifth Test at The Oval was a timeless match. Woodfull won the toss and after England made 405, he scored 54 as Australia amassed 695 to win by an innings and regain the Ashes 2–1. During the Tests, Woodfull had contributed 345 runs at 57.50, second only to Bradman. In all first-class matches, he compiled 1,435 runs at 57.36 including six centuries. Woodfull and his fellow Victorian Ponsford played a significant part by making three century opening stands—162 at Lord's, 159 at The Oval and 106 at Old Trafford to help Australia take the initiative in three Tests. The Times commented that "No praise is too high for Woodfull" and commended the Australian captain's encouragement of his young team.

Upon returning to Australia, Woodfull was elected as Victoria's delegate on the five-man national selection panel, replacing Ryder. However, he resigned from the role before the next international series, thereby never participating in the selection of a Test team.

This was followed by home series against the West Indies in 1930–31, the first Test tour of Australia by the Caribbean side. Ahead of the Tests, Victoria defeated the tourists by an innings and 254, but Woodfull was unable to score any runs against his Test opponents, making a duck.

In the Tests, Woodfull unselfishly broke up his opening combination with Ponsford by dropping down to No. 6 to accommodate the prodigiously talented young batsman Archie Jackson. Woodfull was uncomfortable batting out of position, scoring six, 58 and 17 in the first three Tests. Woodfull batted only once in each Test, as Australia easily won the first Test by ten wickets, and the next two by an innings. Woodfull was restored to the top of the order for the fourth Test in Melbourne after Jackson's illness became too much, forcing the young batsman to withdraw from competition. Woodfull struck 83 run out as Australia took a third consecutive innings victory. He then scored his first century for the season, making 177 and 27 not out in a state match against South Australia.

However, Australia's winning run came to an end with a 30-run loss in the fifth Test, with Woodfull scoring 22 and 18. He ended the series with a modest 204 runs at 34.00 as Australia won 4–1. He ended the summer with 477 runs at 47.70.

The following season saw a tour to Australia by the South Africans for the first time in two decades. Woodfull started the season by scoring 121 and leading his state to an 88-run win over the tourists ahead of the Tests. It was a signal of what was to follow in the Tests. He then managed only 32 and nine as Victoria narrowly lost to South Australia by 21 runs.

Woodfull scored 74 and 58 as Australia took innings victories in the first two Tests over the South Africans in Brisbane and Sydney. He then scored 147 to script a three-wicket win over arch-rivals New South Wales, after Victoria had been forced to chase 434 for victory.

In the third Test in Melbourne, Australia found themselves on the back foot for the first time in the series. Woodfull scored only seven in the first innings, as Australia made only 198 and South Africa took a 160-run lead. He then compiled his Test best of 161 in the second innings, adding 274 in partnership with Bradman in only three hours, to help Australia make 554 and set up a 169-run win. It was the second successive Test season in which Woodfull had saved his highest Test score of the series for his home crowd. He continued his run with 82 and 37 not out in the fourth Test, which was won by ten wickets.

Woodfull had an opportunity to inflict more blows on the tourists as Victoria played them for the second time ahead of the final Test. While his state was unable to force a result, Woodfull continued his strong form with 44 and 73 not out. The Australian captain finished the season with a duck from the opening ball of the fifth Test, bowled after failing to offer a shot, but Australia won by an innings and 72 runs in the equivalent of a single day's play on a sticky wicket.

Woodfull opened for the entire series, and returned his best ever series figures of 421 at 70.17, second only to Bradman. The 5–0 result remains the only time that Australia has clean-swept South Africa over five Tests. He ended the season with 849 runs at 65.31.

=== Bodyline ===
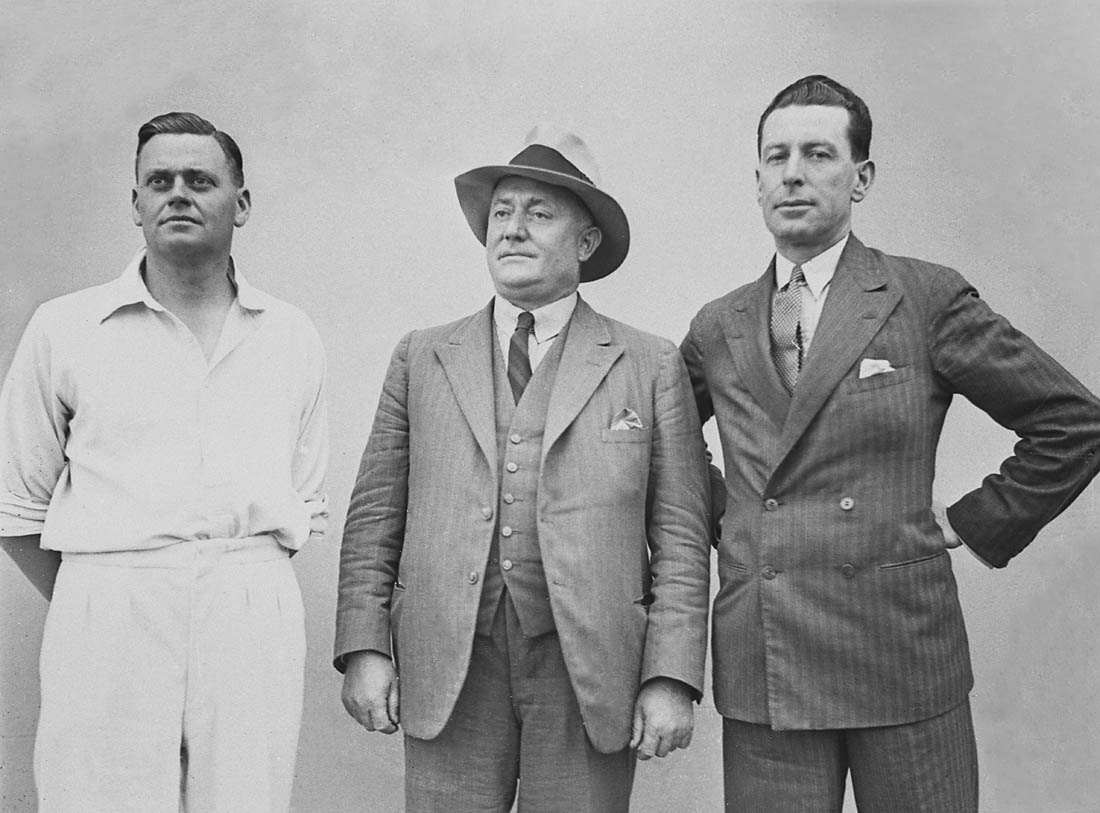
Woodfull (left) with Monty Noble and Tim Wall, c. 1932

In 1932–33, the English team led by Douglas Jardine toured Australia and won the Ashes in a very acrimonious series. It has been described as the most controversial period in Australian cricket history, and voted the most important Australian moment by a panel of Australian cricket identities.

England's bodyline tactics, which involved bowling at speeds of around 150 km/h at the heads and torsos of the Australian batsmen—including Woodfull—and employing a close leg-side cordon to catch balls fended away from the upper body, caused great controversy and ill-feeling among Australian players and crowds. England devised the tactics in an attempt to curb Donald Bradman, Australia's star batsman, whose average hovered around 100, around twice that of all other world-class batsman. However, they also hoped to restrict the other batsmen, Woodfull among them, through such means.

During the season, Woodfull's physical courage, stoic and dignified leadership won him many admirers. He refused to employ retaliatory tactics and did not publicly complain even though he and his men were repeatedly hit— according to Ken Piesse, 34 times in all. Once the issue was resolved, and practice stopped, Woodfull refused to discuss the matter, fearing that it would disturb the peace.

Woodfull started the season strongly, scoring 74 and 83 in a loss to New South Wales in the second match of the summer, but was soon confronted by Jardine's Englishmen. He made five and 25 as England crushed Victoria by an innings. Although England did aim at the batsmen's body, they did not enforce the second half of the Bodyline structure, by not packing the leg side. This changed in the next match, when Woodfull led an Australian XI against the tourists in Melbourne, in what was effectively a Test rehearsal. With Jardine rested from the match, his deputy Bob Wyatt used the full Bodyline tactics for the first time. The match was drawn and Woodfull struggled, making 18 and a duck. Utilising his hopping technique and attempting to play unorthodox shots resembling overhead tennis smashes, Bradman failed to make an impact, and England were buoyed ahead of the Tests.

Australia lost heavily by ten wickets in the first Test at Sydney, when the bodyline spearhead, Harold Larwood, took ten wickets, while Woodfull managed only seven and a duck. Before the second Test in Melbourne, Woodfull had to wait until minutes before the game before he was confirmed as captain by the selectors. This caused the toss to be delayed and fomented speculation that the Australian Board of Control were considering the possibility of removing Woodfull because of his absolute refusal to allow his bowlers to use retaliatory tactics. His deputy Victor Richardson had advocated retaliation along with several other players. Richardson recalled Woodfull's private response:

There is no way I will be influenced to adopt such tactics which bring such discredit to the game. I know Tim could do it but I am not going to participate in actions that can only hurt the game.

Although Woodfull led Australia to a dramatic victory by 111 runs, his form was a problem as he managed only 10 and 26; he was also hit by the bowling. The bodyline controversy reached its peak during the second day of the third Test. An all-time record Adelaide Oval crowd of 50,962 watched Australia finish off England's first innings for 341. Then, Woodfull opened Australia's batting with Jack Fingleton, who was dismissed straight away for a duck. Minutes later Larwood, bowling to a conventional field setting, struck Woodfull an agonising blow under his heart with a short, lifting delivery. As Woodfull bent down over his bat in pain for several minutes, an image that became one of the defining symbols of the series, the huge crowd began jeering, hooting and verbally abusing the English team, something that was almost unheard of for the social standards of the era. Jardine reacted by saying "Well bowled, Harold".

When play resumed, England's Gubby Allen bowled an entire over to Bradman. As Larwood prepared to bowl his next over to Woodfull, Jardine changed to the Bodyline field setting. The capacity Saturday afternoon crowd viewed this as hitting a man when he was down. Journalist-cricketer Dick Whitington, wrote that Jardine's actions were seen as "an unforgivable crime in Australian eyes and certainly no part of cricket". Mass hooting and jeering occurred after almost every ball. Whitington noted that "[Umpire] Hele believes that had what followed occurred in Melbourne the crowd would have leapt the fence and belaboured the English captain; Larwood, and possibly the entire side". Some English players later expressed fears that a large-scale riot and that the police would not be able to stop the irate home crowd, who were worried that Woodfull or Bradman could be killed, from attacking them. When Larwood immigrated to Australia two decades later, he remained fearful for his safety.

During the over, another rising Larwood delivery knocked the bat out of Woodfull's hands. He battled it out for 89 minutes, collecting more bruises before Allen bowled him for 22. Later in the day, the English team manager Pelham Warner visited the Australian dressing room to express his sympathies to Woodfull. Woodfull had remained calm in public, refusing to complain about Jardine's tactics. Woodfull's abrupt response was meant to be private, but it was leaked to the press and became the most famous quotation of this tumultuous period in cricket history:

I do not want to see you, Mr Warner. There are two teams out there. One is playing cricket and the other is not.

Woodfull reportedly added "This game is too good to be spoilt. It's time some people got out of it", hinting that he might withdraw his team from competition in protest. Australia's Leo O'Brien later reported that Warner was close to tears following Woodfull's rebuke. Australian singer Paul Kelly reflected on Woodfull's character in this incident in his song "Bradman":

Now Bill Woodfull was as fine a man as ever went to wicket
And the bruises on his body that day showed that he could stick it
But to this day he's still quoted and only he could wear it
'There are two sides out there today and only one of them's playing cricket'

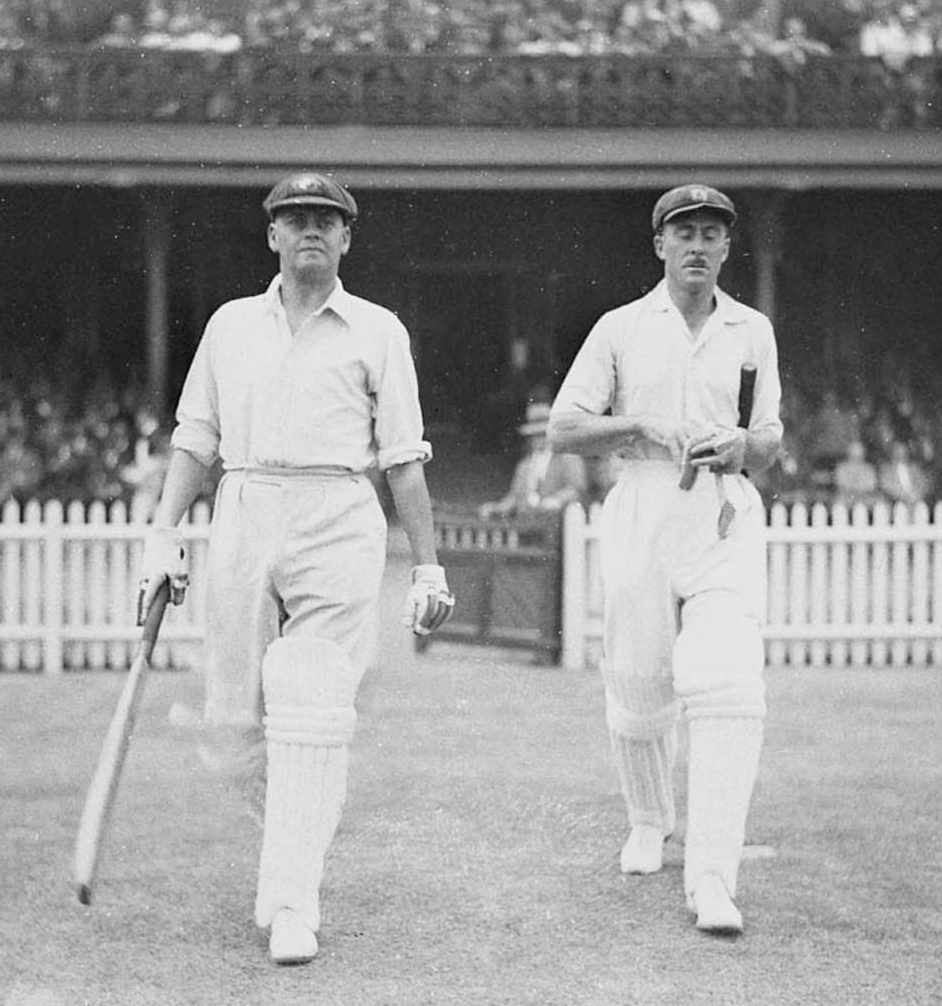
Woodfull (left) walks out to open the batting with Vic Richardson in the final Bodyline Test.

In the meantime, the second innings in Adelaide saw England set Australia a near-impossible 532 for victory; even today, the highest successful Test run chase is 418. Australia lost its first wicket at three when Jack Fingleton was bowled by Larwood. Woodfull was joined by Bradman, who played in an unorthodox counterattacking method, before being dismissed for 66. Woodfull continued on to score an unbeaten 73, carrying his bat as his teammates capitulated around him. Australia was eventually all out for 193, with Oldfield unable to bat due to his fractured skull.

Woodfull made scores of 67, 19, 14 and 67 in the final two Tests, which Australia lost by six and eight wickets respectively. In the fifth Test in Sydney, Larwood broke a bone in his foot, but Jardine made him complete the over, even though the laws of cricket permit a captain to switch bowlers mid-over in the case of injury. Larwood stood stationary at the wicket and bowled without a run-up, but Woodfull refused to take advantage of the injured bowler. He blocked the five remaining deliveries back down the wicket towards Larwood and refused to take a run.

England reclaimed the Ashes 4–1. Overall, Woodfull had scored 305 runs at a moderate 33.89 average—it was the slowest scoring rate for his career, but significantly, he had defied the English bowling for over twenty hours in total, more than any other Australian. Amid the high drama of the season, Woodfull's struggles spread beyond the Test arena; he scored only 297 runs at 33.00 in matches outside the Tests.

In 1933–34 cricket returned to normality with the departure of Jardine's men. Woodfull scored 118 in a one-off match between his XI and Richardson's XI, which ended in a draw. He then scored 129 in the run-chase as The Rest of Australia narrowly defeated New South Wales by two wickets. Woodfull scored fifties in both interstate matches against New South Wales and added consecutive centuries for the national team against Tasmania before departing for his final tour of England. He ended the season with 818 runs at 62.92, returning to form after the tumult of the previous summer.

=== International farewell ===
In 1934, having been reappointed to a position on the selection panel, Woodfull led Australia back to England on a tour that had been under a cloud after the tempestuous cricket diplomacy of the previous bodyline series. After agreements were put in place so that bodyline would not be used, the tour went ahead. However, there were occasions when the Australians felt that their hosts had crossed the mark with tactics resembling bodyline.

Woodfull started his final English campaign slowly. In his first eight innings, he scored only 161 runs at 20.12 with one half-century. Other players sensed that Woodfull had become less cheerful following the bodyline series and he offered to drop himself following his run of poor form, but fellow selectors Bradman and Alan Kippax disagreed. In the traditional Test rehearsal against the MCC, Australia reduced the hosts to be eight down in their second innings, still in arrears when the match ended in a draw. In his final innings before the Tests, Woodfull struck form with 172 not out against Lancashire.

In the first Test at Trent Bridge, Woodfull struck 26 and two. Australia led by 106 on the first innings and although Woodfull was so concerned with batting England out of the match that he declared with less than five hours remaining on the final day, his men went on to win by 238 runs, albeit with only ten minutes of play remaining. England struck back in the second Test at Lord's. Woodfull made 22 as Australia replied to England's 440 with 284. The hosts enforced the follow on as rain breathed life into the pitch, and Woodfull made 43 as Australia were all out for 118 in an innings defeat.

He then scored 73 run out, his only fifty in the Tests, as Australia made 491 and ceded a 136-run lead in the third Test at Old Trafford. However, they held on for a draw. Woodfull made a duck in the fourth Test at Headingley, but another Bradman triple century put them in control before rain shortened the match; England still needed 155 runs to make Australia bat again with only four wickets in hand when the match ended. The draw meant that the series was at 1–1 heading into the final Test at The Oval, which would be timeless.

In the lead-up to the decider, Woodfull ran into form. In consecutive innings, he scored 131 and 228 not out against Gloucestershire and Glamorgan respectively. However controversy followed in a match against Nottinghamshire. In the first innings, Woodfull scored 81 as Australia batted first and made 237. Bill Voce, one of the bodyline practitioners of 1932–33, employed it with the wicket-keeper standing to the leg side and took 8/66. In the second innings, Voce repeated the tactic late in the day, in fading light against Woodfull and Bill Brown. Of his 12 balls, 11 were no lower than head height.

Woodfull told the Nottinghamshire administrators that, if Voce's leg side bowling was repeated, his men would leave the field and return to London. He further said that Australia would not return to the county in future. The following day, Voce was absent, ostensibly due to a leg injury. Already angered by the absence of Larwood, the Nottinghamshire faithful heckled the Australians all day. Australia had previously and privately complained that some pacemen had strayed past the agreement in the Tests.

When the teams took to the field for the deciding Test, Woodfull won the toss and elected to bat. He scored 49 as Australia amassed 701 in the timeless match. England replied with 321, and Woodfull made 13 in his final Test innings. The tourists made 327 and set England a target of 708 for victory. His bowlers then dismissed the hosts for 145 to seal a decisive win by 562 runs, and the series 2–1. On 22 August, for the second time in four years, Australia had won the Ashes on Woodfull's birthday.

The victory made Woodfull the only captain to regain the Ashes twice. He scored 1,268 runs at 52.83 during the tour with three centuries. His tally of 25 Tests as captain was a world record and remained unsurpassed for a quarter of a century.

Woodfull performed poorly in the Tests, with 228 runs at 28.50, but it was sufficient for an Australian triumph as Bradman and Ponsford each averaged over 90 and Clarrie Grimmett and Bill O'Reilly each took over 25 wickets. Woodfull was criticised by Robinson for his relatively defensive captaincy, tending to bat opponents out of the match instead of going directly for victory from the off. Woodfull relied on O'Reilly and Grimmett, using only three specialist bowlers as he sought to reinforce the batting line-up. However, he was effective in curtailing leading English batsmen Wally Hammond. When Woodfull was captaining Australia, Hammond only averaged half as much as he did when another player was captaining Australia.

He retired immediately after the tour and was awarded a joint testimonial with Ponsford on his return to Victoria. The match raised a total of 2,084 Australian pounds. In this match between Woodfull's XI and Richardson's XI, he scored 111 in his final innings, as his men made 316 in reply to 196. Woodfull then took his only wicket at first-class level in the second innings and his team reached the target of 280 with seven wickets in hand without him having to bat.

In early 1935, Woodfull lost his position as the Victorian delegate on the national selection panel after being defeated by William Johnson in a vote.

== Retirement ==
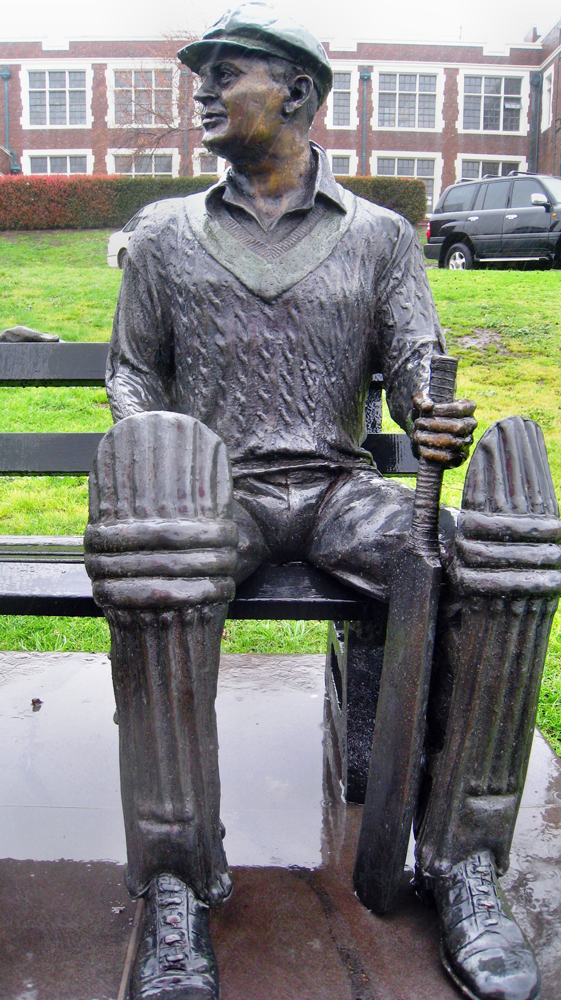
Life-size bronze statue of Bill Woodfull outside Melbourne High School, by Linda Klarfeld

Woodfull spent several years as headmaster at Box Hill High School then principal at Upwey High School for four years. He was active in local cricket, being elected a senior vice-president of the Mountain District Cricket Association, representing the Upwey Cricket Club. In 1948 he embarked on a successful career as a mathematics teacher at Melbourne Boys High School, and was headmaster for six years. He was known for his stern discipline throughout his career. One of his students was future Australian Test all rounder and Australian Cricket Hall of Fame inductee Keith Miller, whom he taught in year nine. Miller was a mediocre student, as he did little study and focused his energy on sport. This disappointed Woodfull, a disciplined man who invoked the school motto, which meant Honour the Work and exhorted his students to work hard as Australia was attempting to emerge from the depths of the Great Depression. Miller scored zero in his final exam for Woodfull's geometry class, and was forced to repeat the year. Despite his credentials, Woodfull refused to involve himself in coaching the school's cricket teams, feeling that it would intrude on the responsibilities of the sports teachers. Despite this, Woodfull watched the students at cricket training and quickly noticed Miller's skills, writing in the school magazine that "Miller has Test possibilities". Other notable students included Doug Ring, a leg spinner who was a member of Bradman's Invincibles, left arm orthodox spinner Jack Wilson and world record breaking Olympic distance runner Ron Clarke. The school oval was later named the Miller-Woodfull Oval.

The rejuvenated Maldon Oval in his home town was renamed the Bill Woodfull Recreation Reserve, and when the Great Southern Stand was constructed at the Melbourne Cricket Ground in 1992, one of the entrances was named the Bill Woodfull Gate.

Woodfull married Gwen King, whom he met while singing in the choir at his father's church in Albert Park, and they married after Woodfull's return from the England tour in 1926. They had three children. His two sons Jack and Bill Jr, played for Upwey cricket club and later at Melbourne University Cricket Club and became successful dentists.

In November 1934, the Governor-General informed him that the King had offered him a knighthood, "for services to cricket", The citation made a veiled reference to Woodfull's actions during the bodyline episode. Woodfull always considered his contributions to education more important than anything he ever did on the cricket field, and declined the honour. In later life he said "Had I been awarded it for being an educationalist, then I would have accepted it. But under no circumstances would I accept it for playing cricket." In 1963, he was invested as an Officer of the Order of the British Empire (OBE) for services to education. In 1965, while on holiday with his wife and daughter Jill, he collapsed and died while playing golf in Tweed Heads, New South Wales. His family remained adamant that the bruising bodyline attack had permanently damaged his health and curtailed his life. Woodfull was inducted into the Australian Cricket Hall of Fame in 2001, one of the first 15 inductees.

== Test match performance ==
		Batting				Bowling			
Opposition	Matches	Runs	Average	High Score	100 / 50	Runs	Wickets	Average	Best (Inns)
England	25	1675	44.07	155	6/8	–	–	–	–
South Africa	5	421	70.16	161	1/3	–	–	–	–
West Indies	5	204	34.00	83	0/2	–	–	–	–
Overall	35	2300	46.00	161	7/13	–	–	–	–

Preceded by Jack Ryder	Australian Test cricket captains 1930–1934	Succeeded by Vic Richardson
