= Harold Corbett =

Australian rugby league footballer and soldier

Personal information
- Full name: Harold William Corbett
- Born: 13 March 1890 Waterloo, New South Wales
- Died: 3 May 1917 (aged 27) Bullecourt, France

Playing information
- Position: Halfback
Club
Years	Team	Pld	T	G	FG	P
1911–12	Eastern Suburbs	5	0	0	0	0
1913	Annandale	3	0	0	0
	Total	8	0	0	0	0
- Military career
- Allegiance: Australia
- Branch: Australian Army
- Service years: 1915-1917
- Rank: Sergeant
- Unit: 19th Battalion
- Conflicts: World War I; Gallipoli campaign; Western Front; Second Bullecourt
- Relatives: Claude Corbett (brother)

Harold William Corbett (13 March 1890 – 3 May 1917) was a pioneer Australian rugby league footballer and soldier who served in World War I and died on the Western Front.

== Rugby League ==
Brought up in Sydney's Eastern Suburbs, Corbett attended Waverley Public School. He played for the Eastern Suburbs and Annandale clubs of the New South Wales Rugby Football League premiership. Corbett was in the Easts' squad during their first and second premiership years of 1911 and 1912. He was the 56th player to play first-grade for Eastern Suburbs.

His father William Francis Corbett (1857–1923) and brother Claude Corbett were both well-known Sydney sporting journalists.

== War service ==
Roll of honour, Australian National Memorial, Villers-Bretonneux cemetery

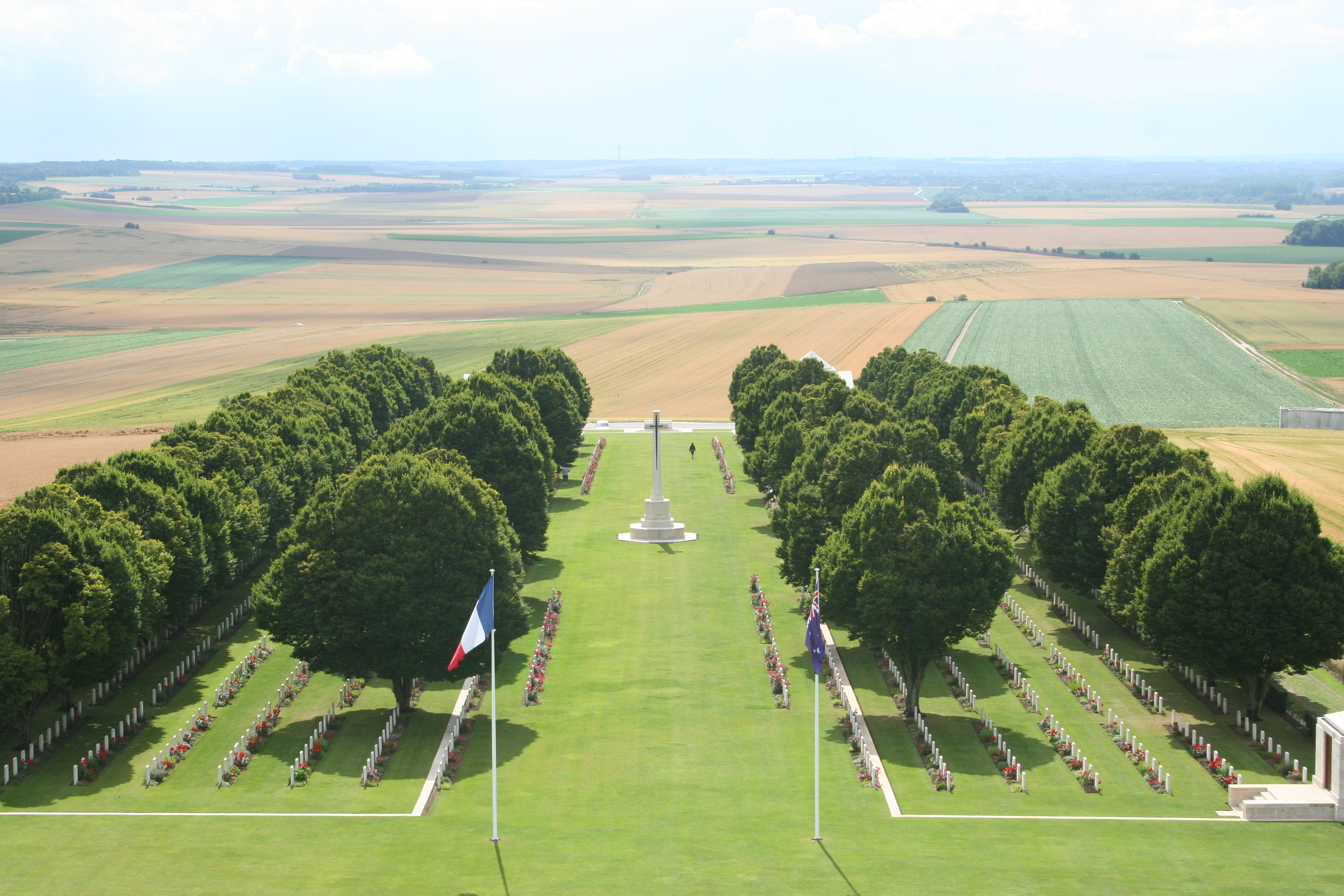
View from the top of the Australian National Memorial at Villers-Bretonneux cemetery where Corbett and over 10,000 other Australian fallen are honoured

Harold also gave his occupation as "Journalist" when he enlisted in the first AIF in 1915. He embarked from Sydney on board HMAT A21 Marere in August 1915 as a Sergeant in the 19th Battalion of the 5th Brigade (New South Wales). The 19th Battalion had been raised in 1915 and was first sent to Gallipoli where it fought against the Turks, before being withdrawn from the peninsula and being sent to France in early 1916, where it served in the trenches along the Western Front as part of the Australian Corps.

In 1917, the 19th Battalion was involved in the attack on German forces after their retreat to the Hindenburg Line. Corbett was killed in action on 3 May 1917 being the first day of battle of Second Bullecourt. He has no known grave but is commemorated at the Commonwealth Memorial in Villers-Bretonneux.

== Bibliography ==
- Whiticker, Alan & Hudson, Glen (2006) The Encyclopedia of Rugby League Players, Gavin Allen Publishing, Sydney

== Online sources ==
- Harold Corbett at the AIF Project
