= English cricket team in Australia in 1932–33 =

International cricket tour

1932–33 Ashes series
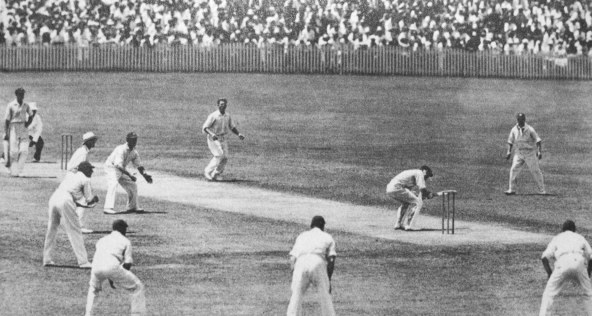
- Bill Woodfull evades a bodyline ball
- Date: 2 December 1932 – 28 February 1933
- Location: Australia
- Result: England won the 5-test series 4-1
Teams
- Australia: England
Captains
- (Australia) Bill Woodfull: (England) Douglas Jardine
Most runs
- Don Bradman (396) Stan McCabe (385) Bill Woodfull (305): Wally Hammond (440); Herbert Sutcliffe (440); Bob Wyatt (250)
Most wickets
- Bill O'Reilly (27) Tim Wall (16) Bert Ironmonger (15): Harold Larwood (33); Gubby Allen (21); Bill Voce (15)

A cricket team representing England toured Australia in the 1932–33 season. The tour was organised by the Marylebone Cricket Club and matches outside the Tests were played under the MCC name. The tour included five Test matches in Australia, and England won The Ashes by four games to one. The tour was highly controversial because of the bodyline bowling tactics used by the England team under the captaincy of Douglas Jardine. After the Australian tour was over, the MCC team moved on to play in New Zealand, where two further Test matches were played.

== The MCC team ==
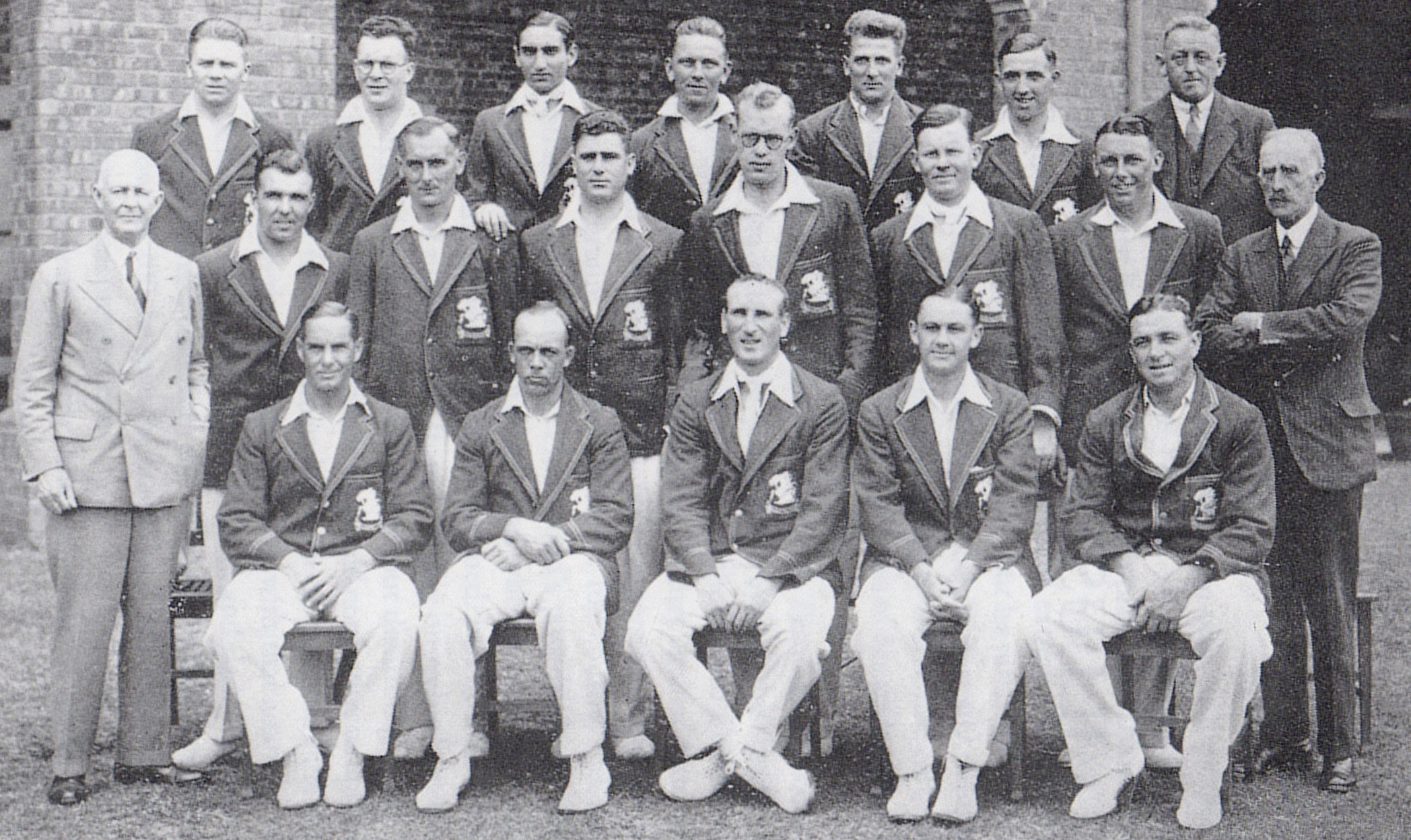
The England team photographed before the Adelaide Test Back row: George Duckworth, Tommy Mitchell, Nawab of Pataudi, Maurice Leyland, Harold Larwood, Eddie Paynter, W. Ferguson (scorer) Middle row: Pelham Warner (co-manager), Les Ames, Hedley Verity, Bill Voce, Bill Bowes, Freddie Brown, Maurice Tate, R. C. N. Palairet (co-manager). Front row: Herbert Sutcliffe, Bob Wyatt, Douglas Jardine, Gubby Allen, Wally Hammond

The MCC team was captained by Douglas Jardine, with Bob Wyatt as vice-captain. Pelham Warner and Richard Palairet were joint managers.

The team members were:

- Douglas Jardine, Surrey, team captain & batsman
- Bob Wyatt, Warwickshire, vice-captain & batsman
- Gubby Allen, Middlesex, all-rounder
- Les Ames, Kent, wicket-keeper
- Bill Bowes, Yorkshire, fast bowler
- Freddie Brown, Surrey, leg break bowler
- George Duckworth, Lancashire, wicket-keeper
- Wally Hammond, Gloucestershire, all-rounder
- Harold Larwood, Nottinghamshire, opening fast bowler
- Maurice Leyland, Yorkshire, batsman
- Tommy Mitchell, Derbyshire, leg break bowler
- Nawab of Pataudi, Worcestershire, batsman
- Eddie Paynter, Lancashire, batsman
- Herbert Sutcliffe, Yorkshire, opening batsman
- Maurice Tate, Sussex, all-rounder
- Hedley Verity, Yorkshire, left arm spin bowler
- Bill Voce, Nottinghamshire, opening fast bowler

Walter Robins and Kumar Shri Duleepsinhji were invited to tour, but declined to do so, the latter because of ill-health.

== Test matches ==
=== First Test ===
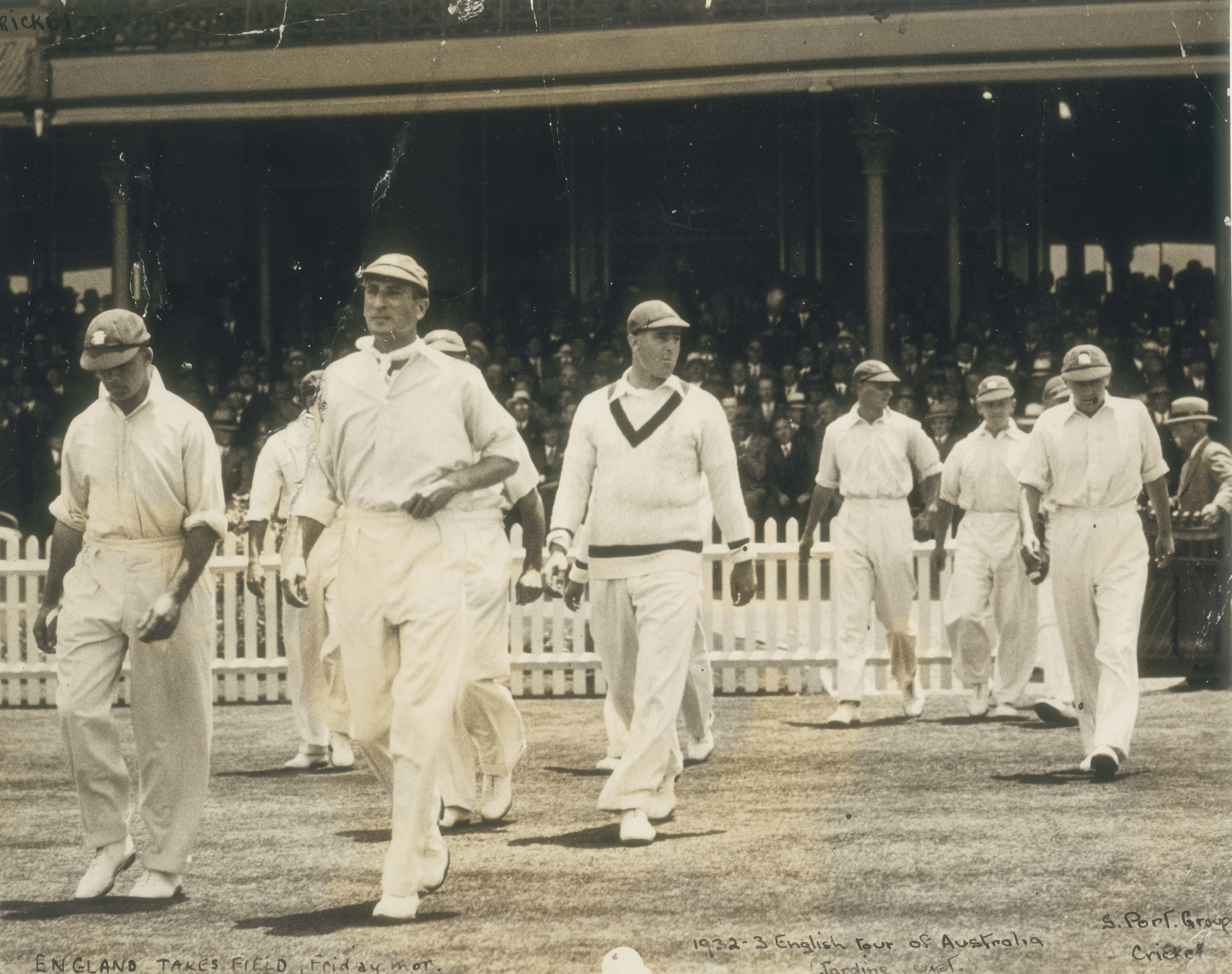
Jardine leads the English Team onto the Sydney Cricket Ground, 2 Dec 1932

2–7 December
(Timeless Test)
Scorecard

Australia	v	England
360 (102.2 overs); Stan McCabe 187* (233); Harold Larwood 5/96 (31 overs)		524 (229.4 overs); Herbert Sutcliffe 194 (496); Tim Wall 3/104 (38 overs)
164 (63.3 overs); Jack Fingleton 40 (120); Harold Larwood 5/28 (18 overs)		1/0 (0.1 overs); Herbert Sutcliffe 1* (1); Stan McCabe 0/1 (0.1 overs)

England won by 10 wickets
Sydney Cricket Ground, Sydney
Umpires: George Borwick (Aus) and George Hele (Aus)

- Australia won the toss and elected to bat.
- Test debuts: Lisle Nagel (Australia) and the Nawab of Pataudi (England)

An easy victory for England, with Bradman absent for Australia due to a contract dispute with the Australian Board of Control. McCabe provided Australia's only significant resistance with the bat; Larwood claimed ten match wickets. Pataudi's century on Test debut was to be his sole Test century, and he was dropped after the second Test due to his dissent against Bodyline tactics (when he refused to move to a leg-side fielding position, Jardine is said to have commented "I see his highness is a conscientious objector").

=== Second Test ===
30 December–3 January
(Timeless Test)
Scorecard

Australia	v	England
228 (86.3 overs); Jack Fingleton 83 (227); Bill Voce 3/54 (20 overs)		169 (85.3 overs); Herbert Sutcliffe 52 (182); Bill O'Reilly 5/63 (34.3 overs)
191 (56.5 overs); Don Bradman 103* (146); Wally Hammond 3/21 (10.5 overs)		139 (55.1 overs); Herbert Sutcliffe 33 (63); Bill O'Reilly 5/66 (24 overs)

Australia won by 111 runs
Melbourne Cricket Ground, Melbourne
Umpires: George Borwick (Aus) and George Hele (Aus)

- Australia won the toss and elected to bat.
- Test debut: Leo O'Brien (Australia)

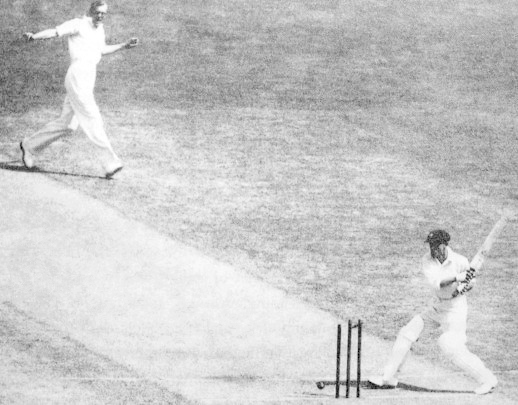
Bradman is bowled first ball, 30 December 1932

On his return, Bradman was bowled first ball in the first innings when expecting a bouncer; Fingleton was left to hold Australia's first innings together. Nonetheless, an unbeaten century for Bradman in the second innings, and ten wickets for O'Reilly, granted Australia their only victory of the Test series.

=== Third Test ===
13–19 January
(Timeless Test)
Scorecard

England	v	Australia
341 (146.1 overs); Maurice Leyland 83 (190); Tim Wall 5/72 (34.1 overs)		222 (95.4 overs); Bill Ponsford 85 (213); Gubby Allen 4/71 (23 overs)
412 (191.3 overs); Wally Hammond 85 (247); Bill O'Reilly 4/79 (50.3 overs)		193 (69.2 overs); Bill Woodfull 73* (208); Gubby Allen 4/50 (17.2 overs)

England won by 338 runs
Adelaide Oval, Adelaide
Umpires: George Borwick (Aus) and George Hele (Aus)

- England won the toss and elected to bat.
- Bert Oldfield (Australia) retired hurt during Australia's 1st innings after suffering a fractured skull.

The match best known for Bodyline, with Woodfull receiving a blow to the chest (although he stayed at the crease to make an obdurate 73 not out) and Oldfield a fractured skull from Larwood's hostile fast bowling (although Oldfield's injury actually came from a top-edge to a waist-high delivery, rather than a proper bouncer, and Larwood was not bowling to a leg-theory field at the time: Oldfield declared it to have been his own fault for a poor shot.) Larwood took seven wickets in the match, but the principal wicket-taker was Allen, who took four in either innings despite his notable dissent against Bodyline.

=== Fourth Test ===
10–16 February
(Timeless Test)
Scorecard

Australia	v	England
340 (121 overs); Vic Richardson 83 (146); Harold Larwood 4/101 (31 overs)		356 (185.4 overs); Herbert Sutcliffe 86 (244); Bill O'Reilly 4/120 (67.4 overs)
175 (68.3 overs); Len Darling 39 (80); Gubby Allen 3/44 (17 overs)		162/4 (79.4 overs); Maurice Leyland 86 (235); Bert Ironmonger 2/47 (35 overs)

England won by 6 wickets
The Gabba, Brisbane
Umpires: George Borwick (Aus) and George Hele (Aus)

- Australia won the toss and elected to bat.
- Test debuts: Len Darling, Ernest Bromley, Hammy Love (Australia), and Thomas Mitchell (England)

A match best remembered for the heroism of Paynter, who despite spending much of the match in hospital with severe tonsillitis, scored 83 in the first innings, and won the match with a six in the second.

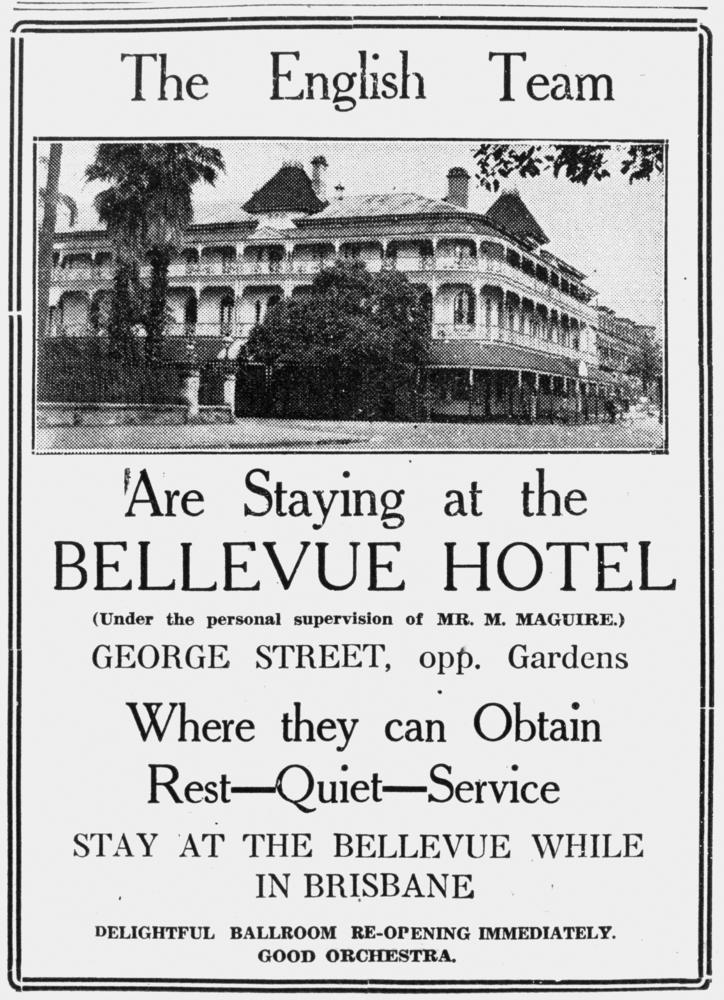
Advertisement for the Bellevue Hotel, where the English team stayed during the fourth test

=== Fifth Test ===
23–28 February
(Timeless Test)
Scorecard

Australia	v	England
435 (108.2 overs); Len Darling 85 (129); Harold Larwood 4/98 (32.2 overs)		454 (171.2 overs); Wally Hammond 101 (205); Philip Lee 4/111 (40.2 overs)
182 (54.4 overs); Don Bradman 71 (69); Hedley Verity 5/33 (19 overs)		168/2 (71.2 overs); Wally Hammond 75 (140); Bert Ironmonger 2/34 (26 overs)

England won by 8 wickets
Sydney Cricket Ground, Sydney
Umpires: George Borwick (Aus) and George Hele (Aus)

- Australia won the toss and elected to bat.

Fine performances from both sides' middle orders (with some aid from dropped catches) led to approximate parity after the first innings. Hammond (101) and Larwood (98) in particular batted excellently; Larwood, promoted to number four as a night-watchman, scored the then highest innings ever made in that role. Bradman and Woodfull shared a partnership of 115 in Australia's second innings before Verity induced a collapse, and Wyatt and Hammond experienced little difficulty in reaching a target of 164, with Hammond in particularly belligerent form.

== Ceylon ==
The English team had a stopover in Colombo en route to Australia and played a one-day single-innings match there against the Ceylon national team, which at that time did not have Test status.

== See also ==
For details of the tactics involved in Bodyline bowling, see the Bodyline article.
