= Vic Richardson =

Australian sportsman (1894–1969)

Personal information
- Full name: Victor York Richardson
- Born: 7 September 1894; Parkside, South Australia
- Died: 30 October 1969 (aged 75); Fullarton, South Australia
- Nickname: The Guardsman, Yorker
- Height: 1.83 m (6 ft 0 in)
- Batting: Right-handed
- Bowling: Right-arm medium
- Role: Batsman
- Relatives: Ian Chappell (grandson); Greg Chappell (grandson); Trevor Chappell (grandson)

International information
- National side: Australia
- Test debut (cap 119): 19 December 1924 v England
- Last Test: 3 March 1936 v South Africa

Domestic team information
- Years: Team
- 1918/29–1937/38: South Australia

Career statistics
Competition	Test	First-class
Matches	19	184
Runs scored	706	10,727
Batting average	23.53	37.63
100s/50s	1/1	27/47
Top score	138	231
Balls bowled	–	811
Wickets	–	8
Bowling average	–	68.12
5 wickets in innings	–	0
10 wickets in match	–	0
Best bowling	–	3/22
Catches/stumpings	24/0	211/4
- Source: CricInfo, 15 January 2008

Victor York "Yorker" Richardson OBE (7 September 1894 – 30 October 1969), nicknamed The Guardsman, was a leading Australian sportsman of the 1920s and 1930s, captaining the Australia cricket team and the South Australia Australian rules football team, representing Australia in baseball and South Australia in golf, winning the South Australian state tennis title and also being a leading local player in lacrosse, basketball and swimming.

Richardson won the South Australian National Football League's highest individual honour, the Magarey Medal, while captain-coach of Sturt in 1920.

== Early life and education ==
Victor York Richardson was born on 7 September 1894 in Parkside, South Australia, the son of Valentine Yaxley Richardson, who worked as an accountant and painter and decorator, and Rebecca Mary Richardson (née Malloney). He grew up in the Unley area and attended Kyre (later Scotch) College. Naturally athletic, he played many sports, including gymnastics, basketball, cricket, baseball, lacrosse, and Australian rules football.

He worked in the South Australian public service.

== Cricket career ==
Richardson is most famous for his contribution to cricket, representing Australia in 19 Test matches between 1924 and 1936, including five as captain in the 1935–36 tour of South Africa.

A talented right-handed batsman and rated the best fielder in the world, Richardson made his first-class debut for South Australia in the 1918–19 season. In a career that lasted twenty years, he played 184 matches for Australia and South Australia, scoring 10,724 runs, including 27 centuries and averaging 37.63. He took 211 catches (at an average of 1.15 catches per match) and even completed four stumpings as a stand-in wicketkeeper.

Richardson was Australian vice-captain for the 1932–33 English tour of Australia, known as the Bodyline series for England's tactics of bowling fast short-pitched deliveries at the batsmen's bodies. During the Adelaide Test, English manager Pelham Warner came to the Australian dressing seeking an apology from the player who called Harold Larwood a bastard. Richardson, who had answered the knock on the dressing room door turned to his teammates and asked "Which one of you blokes mistook Larwood for that bastard [Douglas] Jardine?"

Richardson played his final Test against South Africa at Durban on 28 February 1936, aged 41 years 178 days. Only ten Australians have played Test cricket at an older age. He took five catches in the second innings, setting a Test record that has never been beaten and was not equalled until Yajurvindra Singh took five in 1976–77.

Following his retirement from cricket, Richardson was appointed South Australian coach in September 1949, replacing Arthur Richardson (no relation).

== Australian rules football career ==
Richardson made his senior Australian rules football debut for Sturt Football Club in the South Australian National Football League in 1915 and in a career interrupted by World War I, played 114 games for Sturt, kicking 23 goals.

- 114 games and 23 goals for Sturt 1915, 1919–1920, 1922–1924, 1926–1927
- Captain of Sturt 1920, 1922–1924
- Member of premiership teams for Sturt 1915, 1919 and 1926
- 10 games for South Australia
- State Captain 1923
- Magarey Medal 1920
- Best and Fairest for Sturt 1922, 1923
- Coach of Sturt 1920, 1922, 1923, 1924

== Other sports ==
Richardson was a gifted sportsman and excelled in other sports besides cricket and Australian rules football, including baseball (national and state representative), golf (state representative), tennis (state title winner), lacrosse, basketball, and swimming.

== Media career ==
After retiring from first-class cricket he went on to become a respected radio commentator, forging a partnership with renowned former English Test captain Arthur Gilligan.

== Political aspirations ==
In March 1949 Richardson announced that he would seek Liberal and Country League pre-selection for the new federal Division of Kingston, situated in Adelaide's south. At the time Richardson lived on Richmond Road, Westbourne Park, which was located in the electorate.

== Personal life ==
On 29 January 1919 Victor Richardson married Vida Yvonne Knapman, daughter of hotelier Alf Knapman (1867–1918). She died on 25 September 1940; they had one son and three daughters.

He was a grandfather to three future Australian Test cricketers Ian Chappell, Greg Chappell (who both also captained Australia at Test level) and Trevor Chappell.

== Recognition and honours ==
Richardson was awarded the Magarey Medal in 1920.

He was appointed an Officer of the Order of the British Empire (OBE) on 10 June 1954 for his services to cricket, including his presidency of the Country Carnival Cricket Association.

The Victor Richardson Gates, erected in 1967 at the south-eastern entrance of Adelaide Oval, and the road leading to them, were named after him by the South Australian Cricket Association.

Preceded by Bill Woodfull	Australian Test cricket captains 1935/6	Succeeded by Don Bradman
