= Ken Piesse =

Australian sports journalist

Kendrick Bruce Piesse (born 1955) is a Melbourne-based Australian sports journalist, commentator, after-dinner speaker and bookseller. He has written or edited many books and other publications, mostly focusing on cricket and Australian rules football.

Piesse also appears on radio station Sport 927 with regular updates on news in the world of sport. In 2018 he wrote his 76th book, Pep, a biography of the Australian cricketer Cec Pepper.
