= Leo O'Brien (cricketer) =

Australian cricketer

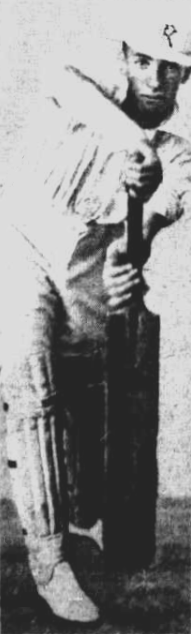

Personal information
- Born: 2 July 1907; West Melbourne, Australia
- Died: 13 March 1997 (aged 89); Mentone, Victoria
- Batting: Left-handed
- Bowling: Right-arm medium

International information
- National side: Australia
- Test debut (cap 145): 30 December 1932 v England
- Last Test: 18 December 1936 v England

Career statistics
Competition	Test	First-class
Matches	5	61
Runs scored	211	3,303
Batting average	26.37	36.70
100s/50s	0/2	7/16
Top score	61	173
Balls bowled	–	166
Wickets	–	3
Bowling average	–	42.33
5 wickets in innings	–	0
10 wickets in match	–	0
Best bowling	–	1/3
Catches/stumpings	3/–	24/–
- Source: Cricinfo, 28 May 2022

Leo Patrick Joseph O'Brien (2 July 1907 – 13 March 1997) was an Australian cricketer and sportsman who played in five Test matches between 1932 and 1936. He was born in West Melbourne, Victoria, and later lived in the Melbourne suburb of Mentone.

== Early life and education ==
O'Brien's parents were Luke Joseph O'Brien, a Victorian Police Inspector, and Katherine Josephine Ryan. He was the eldest of four children, having two brothers and one sister and was a second generation Victorian on his father's side. His grandfather, James O'Brien, was a soldier and policeman. James immigrated, with his two brothers, from Kells, Ireland during the 1850s Victorian Gold Rush period.

His Catholic education extended across Xavier College 1914–1919, St. Joseph's CBC North Melbourne 1920 and St Patrick's College, Ballarat. He married Dorothy Gwendoline Rowston in 1940 and settled in Hampton, Victoria.

== Sporting career ==
O'Brien was a very determined left-handed batsman who played for the Richmond Cricket Club, now known as the Monash Tigers before making his debut for Victoria in the 1929–30 season. During the early 1930s he was a member of the Victorian Sheffield Shield squad along with team members Bill Ponsford and Bill Woodfull.

In the off-season O'Brien was a baseball player, an Australian football player, and an amateur boxer who won a number of fights. As a cricketer he coached in Asia and bred racehorses in his spare time. For more than fifty years he played at least one match a year on the Melbourne Cricket Ground.

As an all round sportsman, and in a rare coincidence, Mentone's only senior football premiership teams of 1928 and 1956, included Mentone Cricket Club's only two Test cricket players, Leo O’Brien and Ian Meckiff. Leo played in the 'full back' position in the 1928 team.

== Later life ==
A large part of his working life was spent as a public servant with the Australian Taxation Office. He was a friendly man and very sociable both on and off the field. His cricket life continued well into his 70s.
