= 1924–25 Sheffield Shield season =

Australian cricket tournament

1924–25 Sheffield Shield
- Cricket format: First-class
- Tournament format: Double round-robin
- Champions: Victoria (10th title)
- Participants: 3
- Matches: 6
- Most runs: Alan Kippax (New South Wales) (532)
- Most wickets: Clarrie Grimmett (South Australia) (28)

The 1924–25 Sheffield Shield season was the 29th season of the Sheffield Shield, the domestic first-class cricket competition of Australia. Victoria won the championship.

== Table ==
Team	Pld	W	L	D	Pts
Victoria	4	3	1	0	2
New South Wales	4	2	2	0	0
South Australia	4	1	3	0	-2

== Fixtures ==
31 October – 6 November 1924
Scorecard

(H) South Australia	v	Victoria
518 (118.3 overs); Jack Murray 126; Hunter Hendry 4/134 (32 overs)		343 (112.2 overs); Frank Tarrant 86; Clarrie Grimmett 5/97 (42 overs)
233 (77 overs); Arthur Richardson 46; Frank Tarrant 3/50 (20 overs)		7/409 (120.3 overs); Hunter Hendry 109*; Clarrie Grimmett 4/170 (50 overs)

Victoria won by 3 wickets
Adelaide Oval, Adelaide
Umpires: C. L. Cornish and S. W. Smith

- South Australia won the toss and elected to bat.

21–27 November 1924
Scorecard

South Australia	v	Victoria (H)
288 (62 overs); David Pritchard 115; Percival Wallace 3/105 (21 overs)		357 (92.6 overs); Bill Ponsford 166; Clarrie Grimmett 5/97 (33.6 overs)
202 (52.3 overs); David Pritchard 55; Frank Tarrant 3/49 (16 overs)		2/134 (40.2 overs); Edgar Mayne 68; Tim Wall 1/20 (6 overs)

Victoria won by 8 wickets
Melbourne Cricket Ground, Melbourne
Umpires: A. D. Reaburn and Dave Elder

- Victoria won the toss and elected to field.

28 November – 2 December 1924
Scorecard

(H) New South Wales	v	South Australia
510 (82.7 overs); Owen Rock 127; Clarrie Grimmett 5/137 (26.7 overs)		248 (57 overs); Vic Richardson 100; Jack Gregory 7/88 (19 overs)
1/54 (16 overs); Owen Rock 27*; Edmund Wainwright 1/22 (6 overs)		314 f/o (68.5 overs); Vic Richardson 125; Arthur Mailey 6/99 (19.5 overs)

New South Wales won by 9 wickets
Sydney Cricket Ground, Sydney
Umpires: Walter French and William Bowes

- New South Wales won the toss and elected to bat.

9–14 January 1925
Scorecard

(H) South Australia	v	New South Wales
389 (74.2 overs); Lance Gun 136*; John Scott 5/92 (17.2 overs)		408 (87.1 overs); Les Gwynne 138; Clarrie Grimmett 3/43 (13 overs)
406 (85.7 overs); Jack Rymill 110; Charles Morrissey 4/87 (21 overs)		226 (54 overs); Les Gwynne 41; Clarrie Grimmett 6/103 (23 overs)

South Australia won by 161 runs
Adelaide Oval, Adelaide
Umpires: C. L. Cornish and G. I. Colyer

- South Australia won the toss and elected to bat.

24–29 January 1925
Scorecard

(H) New South Wales	v	Victoria
614 (148.1 overs); Owen Rock 235; Albert Hartkopf 5/121 (23.1 overs)		502 (134.1 overs); Arthur Liddicut 132; John Scott 5/149 (33.1 overs)
152 (44.6 overs); Owen Rock 51; Hunter Hendry 3/23 (9.6 overs)		3/265 (78.4 overs); Bill Woodfull 120*; Gordon Morgan 1/17 (6 overs)

Victoria won by 7 wickets
Sydney Cricket Ground, Sydney
Umpires: Walter French and William Bowes

- New South Wales won the toss and elected to bat.

30 January – 3 February 1925
Scorecard

(H) Victoria	v	New South Wales
295 (66.4 overs); Bill Ponsford 80; Arthur Mailey 5/103 (22.4 overs)		278 (75 overs); Herbie Collins 70; Leslie Keating 3/31 (11 overs)
155 (46.3 overs); Bill Ponsford 38; Charlie Kelleway 4/35 (15.3 overs)		7/173 (44.5 overs); Warren Bardsley 59; Herbert Gamble 4/38 (10.5 overs)

New South Wales won by 3 wickets
Melbourne Cricket Ground, Melbourne
Umpires: A. D. Reaburn and H. J. Alessio

- Victoria won the toss and elected to bat.

== Statistics ==
=== Most Runs ===
Alan Kippax 532

=== Most Wickets ===
Clarrie Grimmett 28

== Notable events ==
South Australia's victory by 161 runs over New South Wales at Adelaide in January 1925 was their first victory in a Sheffield Shield match since their defeat of Victoria at Adelaide in February 1914.
