= 1925 in sports =

1925 in sports describes the year's events in world sport.

== American football ==
- NFL championship – Chicago Cardinals (11–2–1)
  - Chicago was awarded the championship controversially because the Maroons had been suspended from the NFL for playing an exhibition game against a group of Notre Dame All-Stars.
- Five new teams join the NFL: New York Giants, Detroit Panthers, Providence Steam Roller, a new Canton Bulldogs team and the Pottsville Maroons.
- Rose Bowl (1924 season):
  - The Notre Dame Fighting Irish won 27–10 over the Stanford Indians to win the college football national championship
- Dartmouth Big Green – college football national championship shared with Alabama Crimson Tide
- 3 October – Texas Technological College (now Texas Tech) plays its inaugural intercollegiate football game.

== Association football ==
Events

- The IFAB reforms the offside law, reducing the number of opposing players required to be in front of the attacker for him to be onside from three to two.

England

- The Football League – Huddersfield Town 58 points, West Bromwich Albion 56, Bolton Wanderers 55, Liverpool 50, Bury 49, Newcastle United 48
- FA Cup final – Sheffield United 1–0 Cardiff City at Empire Stadium, Wembley, London

Germany

- National Championship – 1. FC Nürnberg (0–0) 1–0 FSV Frankfurt at Frankfurt

Greece

- Olympiacos F.C., officially founded in Athens.

Russia

- FC Zenit Saint Petersburg, officially founded on May 30.(former Zenit Lenninglad in Soviet Union)

== Australian rules football ==
VFL Premiership

- Geelong wins the 29th VFL Premiership: Geelong 10.19 (79) d Collingwood 9.15 (69) at Melbourne Cricket Ground (MCG)

Brownlow Medal

- The annual Brownlow Medal is awarded to Colin Watson (St Kilda)

Events

- Footscray, Hawthorn and North Melbourne join the league from the VFA

== Bandy ==
Sweden

- Championship final – IF Göta 7-5 Västerås SK

== Baseball ==
World Series

- 7–15 October — Pittsburgh Pirates (NL) defeats Washington Senators (AL) to win the 1925 World Series by 4 games to 3. The Pirates are the first team to win a Series in a comeback down three games to one.

Negro leagues

- Hilldale (ECL) defeats Kansas City Monarchs (NNL) 5 games to 1 in the 1925 Colored World Series

Mexico

- Mexican Baseball League, a first officially game held on June 28.

== Basketball ==
Events

- The American Basketball League is formed as the first major league of professional basketball.

== Boxing ==
Events

- 15 January — Benny Leonard, arguably the greatest-ever lightweight champion, retires from boxing to leave the World Lightweight Championship temporarily vacant
- 2 July — World Middleweight Champion Harry Greb outpoints World Welterweight Champion Mickey Walker over 15 rounds in one of the all-time great boxing matches at New York's Polo Grounds.
- 14 July — death of current World Flyweight Champion Pancho Villa from blood poisoning after a dental operation goes wrong.

Lineal world champions

- World Heavyweight Championship – Jack Dempsey
- World Light Heavyweight Championship – Mike McTigue → Paul Berlenbach
- World Middleweight Championship – Harry Greb
- World Welterweight Championship – Mickey Walker
- World Lightweight Championship – Benny Leonard → vacant → Jimmy Goodrich → Rocky Kansas
- World Featherweight Championship – vacant → Louis "Kid" Kaplan
- World Bantamweight Championship – Eddie "Cannonball" Martin → Charley Phil Rosenberg
- World Flyweight Championship – Pancho Villa → vacant

== Canadian football ==
Grey Cup

- 13th Grey Cup in the Canadian Football League – Ottawa Senators defeat Winnipeg Tammany Tigers 24–1 at Lansdowne Park

== Cricket ==
Events

- Marylebone Cricket Club organises an England tour of Australia in the 1924–25 season. Australia retain The Ashes by winning the five-match Test series 4–1.

England

- County Championship – Yorkshire
- Minor Counties Championship – Buckinghamshire
- Most runs – Jack Hobbs 3024 @ 70.32 (HS 266*)
- Most wickets – Maurice Tate 228 @ 14.97 (BB 8–91)
- Wisden Cricketer of the Year – Jack Hobbs

Australia

- Sheffield Shield – Victoria
- Most runs – Herbert Sutcliffe 1250 @ 69.44 (HS 188)
- Most wickets – Maurice Tate 77 @ 19.01 (BB 7–74)

India

- Bombay Quadrangular – Muslims

New Zealand

- Plunket Shield – Otago

South Africa

- Currie Cup – Western Province

West Indies

- Inter-Colonial Tournament – Trinidad and Tobago

== Cycling ==
Tour de France

- Ottavio Bottecchia (Italy) wins the 19th Tour de France

== Figure skating ==
World Figure Skating Championships

- World Women's Champion – Herma Szabo (Austria)
- World Men's Champion – Willi Böckel (Austria)
- World Pairs Champions – Herma Szabo and Ludwig Wrede (Austria)

== Golf ==
Major tournaments

- British Open – Jim Barnes
- US Open – Willie Macfarlane
- USPGA Championship – Walter Hagen

Other tournaments

- British Amateur – Robert Harris
- US Amateur – Bobby Jones

== Horse racing ==
England

- Cheltenham Gold Cup – Ballinode
- Grand National – Double Chance
- 1,000 Guineas Stakes – Saucy Sue
- 2,000 Guineas Stakes – Manna
- The Derby – Manna
- The Oaks – Saucy Sue
- St. Leger Stakes – Solario

Australia

- Melbourne Cup – Windbag

Canada

- King's Plate – Fairbank

France

- Prix de l'Arc de Triomphe – Priori

Ireland

- Irish Grand National – Dog Fox
- Irish Derby Stakes – Zionist

USA

- Kentucky Derby – Flying Ebony
- Preakness Stakes – Coventry
- Belmont Stakes – American Flag

== Ice hockey ==
Stanley Cup

- 21–30 March — Victoria Cougars defeats Montreal Canadiens in the 1925 Stanley Cup Finals. The Cougars are the last non-NHL team to win the Cup.

Events

- The first-place Hamilton Tigers of the NHL go on strike for an increase in pay. The team is suspended and the players sold to become the New York Americans.
- 2 December — the expansion New York Americans and Pittsburgh Pirates of the NHL play their first-ever game against each other at Pittsburgh. The Americans defeat the Pirates 2–1 in overtime.
- 15 December — the first NHL game is played at Madison Square Garden between the New York Americans and the Montreal Canadiens. The Canadiens win the game 3-1 and are awarded the Prince of Wales Trophy.

== Multi-sport events ==
Far Eastern Championship Games

- The 7th Far Eastern Championship Games are held at Manila, Philippine Islands

== Nordic skiing ==
FIS Nordic World Ski Championships

The inaugural world championships are held at Johannisbad in Czechoslovakia for men only. Winners are:

- Cross-country skiing (18 km) – Otakar Německý (Czechoslovakia)
- Cross-country skiing (50 km) – František Donth (Czechoslovakia)
- Nordic combined (individual) – Otakar Německý (Czechoslovakia)
- Ski jumping (individual large hill) – Willen Dick (Czechoslovakia)

== Rowing ==
The Boat Race

- 28 March — Cambridge win the 77th Oxford and Cambridge Boat Race

== Rugby league ==
England

- Championship – Hull Kingston Rovers
- Challenge Cup final – Oldham 16–3 Hull Kingston Rovers at Headingley Rugby Stadium, Leeds
- Lancashire League Championship – Swinton
- Yorkshire League Championship – Hull Kingston Rovers
- Lancashire County Cup – Oldham 10–0 St Helens Recs
- Yorkshire County Cup – Wakefield Trinity 9–8 Batley

Australia

- NSW Premiership – South Sydney (outright winner)

== Rugby union ==
Five Nations Championship

- 38th Five Nations Championship series is won by Scotland who complete the Grand Slam

== Speed skating ==
Speed Skating World Championships

- Men's All-round Champion – Clas Thunberg (Finland)

== Tennis ==
Australia

- Australian Men's Singles Championship – James Anderson (Australia) defeats Gerald Patterson (Australia) 11–9 2–6 6–2 6–3
- Australian Women's Singles Championship – Daphne Akhurst Cozens (Australia) defeats Esna Boyd Robertson (Australia) 1–6 8–6 6–4

England

- Wimbledon Men's Singles Championship – René Lacoste (France) defeats Jean Borotra (France) 6–3 6–3 4–6 8–6
- Wimbledon Women's Singles Championship – Suzanne Lenglen (France) defeats Joan Fry Lakeman (Great Britain) 6–2 6–0

France

- French Men's Singles Championship – René Lacoste (France) defeats Jean Borotra (France) 7–5 6–1 6–4
- French Women's Singles Championship – Suzanne Lenglen (France) defeats Kitty McKane Godfree (Great Britain) 6–1 6–2

USA

- American Men's Singles Championship – Bill Tilden (USA) defeats Bill Johnston (USA) 4–6 11–9 6–3 4–6 6–3
- American Women's Singles Championship – Helen Wills Moody (USA) defeats Kitty McKane Godfree (Great Britain) 3–6 6–0 6–2

Davis Cup

- 1925 International Lawn Tennis Challenge – United States 5–0 France at Germantown Cricket Club (grass) Philadelphia, United States

== Gymnastics ==
The wheel was invented in 1925 by German Otto Feick in Schönau an der Brend.
