= Rock (name) =

Rock is an English and German surname, a given name and a nickname. A variant of the name is Rocks.

== Surname ==
=== Politicians and activists ===
- Allan Rock (born 1947), Canadian Justice Minister, Health Minister and diplomat
- Heraldine Rock (1933–2012), Saint Lucian politician
- Isabel Rock (died 1971), American politician
- John Rock (abolitionist) (1825–1866), American abolitionist
- Paul Rock (born 1966 or 1967), Welsh politician
- Raymond Rock (1922–2016), Canadian politician
- René Rock (born 1967), German politician

=== Scientists ===
- Irvin Rock (1922–1995), American experimental psychologist, known for The Logic of Perception
- John Rock (American scientist) (1890–1984), one of the inventors of the contraceptive pill
- Joseph Rock (1884–1962), Austrian-American explorer, geographer and botanist
- Miles Rock (1840–1901), American civil engineer, geologist and astronomer

=== Entertainers ===
- Bob Rock (born 1954), Canadian musician, sound engineer and record producer
- Chris Rock (born 1965), American comedian and actor
- Dave Rock, musician of American band Rilo Kiley
- Dickie Rock (1936–2024), Irish singer
- Jay Rock (born 1985), American rapper and songwriter
- Joe Rock (1893–1984), American producer, director, actor, and screenwriter
- Kid Rock (born 1971), American singer-songwriter, rapper, disc jockey, musician, record producer, and actor
- Seán Rocks (1961–2025), Irish broadcaster and actor

=== Athletes ===
- Andrew Rock (born 1982), American sprinter
- Claude Rock (1863–1950), Australian cricketer
- David Rock (cricketer) (born 1957), English cricketer
- Gene Rock (1921–2002), American professional basketball player
- George Rock (cricketer) (1936–2022), Barbadian cricketer
- Joe Rock (baseball) (born 2000), American baseball player
- Katie Rock (born 2003), Albanian swimmer
- Owen Rock (1896–1978), Australian cricketer, son of Claude
- Robert Rock (born 1977), English professional golfer

=== Other professions ===
- Anthony J. Rock, U.S. Air Force Inspector General
- David Rock (architect) (1929–2025), English architect and graphic designer
- David Rock (historian), British historian of Latin America who worked at the University of California
- Karl Rock, New Zealand YouTube personality and blogger
- Mick Rock (1948–2021), British photographer

== Given name ==
- Rock or Roch (c. 1348 – c. 1379), Roman Catholic saint
- Rock F. Jones, 16th President of Ohio Wesleyan University
- Rock Hudson (1925–1985), born Roy Harold Scherer, American actor
- Rock Ya-Sin (born 1996), American football player

== Nickname ==
- Devol Brett (1923–2010), U.S. Air Force lieutenant general
- Dwayne "The Rock" Johnson (born 1972), American/Canadian actor, producer, and professional wrestler
- Don Muraco (born 1949), American professional wrestler
- Nate Quarry (born 1972), American mixed martial artist
- Rock aka Blade Runner Rock, later The Ultimate Warrior (1959–2014), American professional wrestler
- Knute Rockne (1888–1931), Norwegian-American football player and coach
- Tim Raines (born 1959), American Major League Baseball player
- Larry "Rock" Zeidel (1928–2014), Canadian ice hockey player

== Fictional characters ==
- Rock (ロック), a major recurring character in Osamu Tezuka's Star System
- Rock; see Mega Man (character)
- Rockford Amadeus "Rock" Zilla, in the animated TV series My Dad the Rock Star, voiced by Lawrence Bayne

== See also ==
- Rock (disambiguation)
