= Edward Wainwright (disambiguation) =

Edward Wainwright may refer to:

- Ted Wainwright (1865-1919), English cricketer
- Eddie Wainwright (1924-2005), English footballer

== See also ==
- Edmund Wainwright (1903-1995), Australian cricketer
