= Harry Alexander (cricketer) =

Australian cricketer

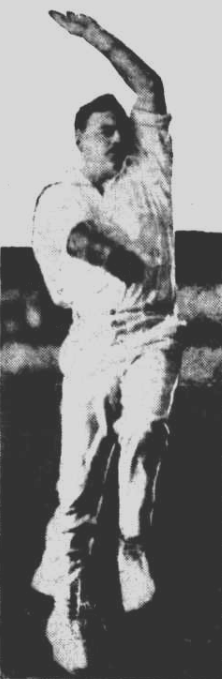

Personal information
- Full name: Harry Houston Alexander
- Born: 9 June 1905; Ascot Vale, Melbourne, Victoria, Australia
- Died: 15 April 1993 (aged 87); East Melbourne, Victoria, Australia
- Nickname: Bull
- Batting: Right-handed
- Bowling: Right-arm fast

International information
- National side: Australia
- Only Test (cap 149): 23 February 1933 v England

Domestic team information
- Years: Team
- 1928/29–1933/34: Victoria

Career statistics
Competition	Test	First-class
Matches	1	41
Runs scored	17	228
Batting average	17.00	6.16
100s/50s	0/0	0/0
Top score	17*	23*
Balls bowled	276	6,449
Wickets	1	95
Bowling average	154.00	33.91
5 wickets in innings	0	2
10 wickets in match	0	0
Best bowling	1/129	7/95
Catches/stumpings	0/0	17/0
- Source: Cricinfo, 1 December 2019

Harry Houston "Bull" Alexander MBE (9 June 1905 – 15 April 1993) was an Australian cricketer who played in one Test match, the fifth of the 1932-33 "bodyline series" against England at the Sydney Cricket Ground, as a fast, right-arm opening bowler.

He played for Victoria in 27 first-class matches between 1929 and 1933, and toured India with the unofficial Australian team in 1935-36.

His best first-class figures were 7 for 95 for Victoria against New South Wales in the 1932-33 Sheffield Shield.

He also played 89 matches for Essendon and 4 matches for North Melbourne in Melbourne local competition cricket between 1924–25 and 1936–37.

During the Second World War Alexander served as a warrant officer in the Australian Army from 1940 to 1945. He served in Malta, the Middle East and the Pacific.

Alexander later moved to Euroa in central Victoria, where he worked as a wool classer and became a municipal councillor.

He oversaw the reconstruction of the local Euroa Memorial Oval to the precise dimensions of the Melbourne Cricket Ground.

He was partly responsible for organising a number of touring teams to play at the oval, including MCC touring teams in 1950/51 and 1965/66.

He was also a past president of the Euroa Football Club. Social rooms at the Memorial Oval are named in his honour and he is listed in the Alexandra, Euroa & District Cricket Association Hall of Fame.
