= Claude Rock =

Australian schoolmaster and cricketer

Personal information
- Full name: Claude William Rock
- Born: 9 June 1863; Deloraine, Tasmania, Australia
- Died: 27 July 1950 (aged 87); Longford, Tasmania, Australia
- Batting: Right-handed
- Bowling: Right-arm round-arm medium-pace
- Relatives: Owen Rock (son); Norman Rock (brother)

Domestic team information
- Years: Team
- 1884–1886: Cambridge University
- 1888-89 to 1892-93: Tasmania

Career statistics
Competition	FC
Matches	31
Runs scored	809
Batting average	16.18
100s/50s	1/2
Top score	102
Balls bowled	7222
Wickets	142
Bowling average	16.54
5 wickets in innings	13
10 wickets in match	5
Best bowling	8/36
Catches/stumpings	38/–
- Source: Cricinfo, 18 April 2020

Claude William Rock (9 June 1863 – 27 July 1950) was an Australian schoolmaster and a cricketer who played first-class cricket for Cambridge University, Tasmania and other amateur teams between 1884 and 1893. He was born in Deloraine, Tasmania and died at Longford, Tasmania.

Rock was the third son of Dr Dennis Rock and his wife, the former Grace Vosper; Dr Rock was a medical practitioner, a justice of the peace and a coroner, and the Rocks had six children, five of whom survived to adulthood. Claude Rock was educated at Launceston Grammar School and at Clare College, Cambridge. A right-handed batsman and a right-arm medium-pace bowler who used the round-arm bowling style, Rock played very successfully in Tasmanian cricket's most important fixture, the North v South match, before he was 16 years old. But with limited fixtures in Tasmania, he did not appear in first-class cricket until his arrival at Cambridge University; when he got into the university side in 1884, he was quickly successful, taking five Marylebone Cricket Club (MCC) wickets for just six runs in his second match. He retained his place in the Cambridge side through to the University Match against Oxford University when, with four wickets and the top-score for the match, an innings of 56, he did well in a comprehensive defeat for his side.

Rock maintained his place in the Cambridge sides of both the 1885 and 1886 seasons, appearing in the University Match in both years; he also played some non-first-class games for Warwickshire when the university term was over. In 1885, his university cricket captain was Lord Hawke and in August he played for an amateur team put together by Hawke which took on a full Yorkshire team and beat them, largely due to second innings bowling figures of eight wickets for 36 runs from Rock, the best of his first-class career. In 1886, he had his most successful University Match, with match figures as a bowler of 10 wickets for 148 runs, though again his team was not successful. His fielding in 1886 was outstanding and he took 25 catches in 14 games. His batting also developed in this season and in some matches he was used as an opening batsman: for a "Cambridge Past and Present" side against the Australians he scored 75, which was his best score in England. At the end of the 1886 season, in the Australian team's farewell match, Rock played for "An England XI" against his compatriots, although the match was left uncompleted after two days.

Rock had graduated from Cambridge University with a Bachelor of Arts degree in 1885, and was 22nd Wrangler, which indicates high academic achievement. He returned to Australia and, despite a back injury that curtailed his bowling, he played in Tasmania's occasional first-class cricket matches against Victoria between 1889 and 1893; in the first of these, the New Year match of 1889, he opened the batting and scored 102 of a second innings total of 193, and this was his highest first-class score. It was also Tasmania's first first-class century.

He became a schoolmaster. He was assistant master at The King's School, Parramatta in 1905, and taught there until his retirement. He then returned to Tasmania, where he died in 1950. He and his wife Frances Mabel (nee Archer) had a daughter and two sons.

Rock's brother Norman also played first-class cricket for Tasmania, and his son Owen played for New South Wales.

== See also ==
- List of Tasmanian representative cricketers
