= Joseph Maxwell =

Australian Victoria Cross recipient

Joseph Maxwell VC, MC & Bar, DCM
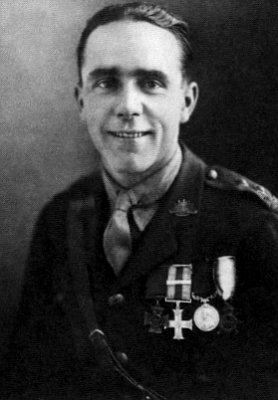
- Joseph Maxwell c. 1919
- Born: 10 February 1896; Forest Lodge, New South Wales
- Died: 6 July 1967 (aged 71); Matraville, New South Wales
- Military career
- Allegiance: Australia
- Branch: Citizen Military Forces (1913–15); Australian Imperial Force (1915–19)
- Service years: 1913–1919; 1940
- Rank: Lieutenant
- Conflicts: First World War; Gallipoli campaign; Western Front; Battle of the Somme; Battle of Pozières; Battle of Passchendaele; Battle of Amiens; Battle of St Quentin Canal; Second World War
- Awards: Victoria Cross; Military Cross & Bar; Distinguished Conduct Medal

Joseph Maxwell, VC, MC & Bar, DCM (10 February 1896 – 6 July 1967) was an Australian soldier, writer, and a recipient of the Victoria Cross, the highest decoration for gallantry "in the face of the enemy" that can be awarded to members of British and Commonwealth armed forces. Often described as Australia's second most decorated soldier of the First World War, he enlisted in the Australian Imperial Force on 8 February 1915, and served at Gallipoli before being transferred to the Western Front. In just over twelve months he was commissioned and decorated four times for his bravery.

An apprentice boilermaker before the war, Maxwell returned to Australia in 1919 and worked as a gardener. In 1932, he published Hell's Bells and Mademoiselles, a book written in collaboration with Hugh Buggy about his war experiences. Attempting to enlist for service during the Second World War, Maxwell was rejected on the grounds of his age before enlisting under an alias in Queensland; his identity was discovered, and after a short period in a training position, he sought discharge. In 1967, aged 71, he died of a heart attack.

== Early life ==
Maxwell was born in the Sydney suburb of Forest Lodge, New South Wales, on 10 February 1896 to John Maxwell, a labourer, and his wife Elizabeth, née Stokes. A member of the Senior Australian Army Cadets for three years, he worked as an apprentice boilermaker at an engineering works near Newcastle upon leaving school. For two years, he served as a member of the Citizen Military Forces, and on 6 February 1915, he enlisted in the Australian Imperial Force enticed by the prospects of better pay.

== First World War ==
=== Training, February 1915 to Western Front, May 1917 ===
Having received his initial training at Liverpool Camp, Maxwell was allotted to "B" Company of the 18th Battalion as a lance corporal, and embarked for Egypt aboard HMAT Ceramic on 25 May 1915. The 18th Battalion trained in Egypt from mid-June until mid-August, before proceeding to Gallipoli, where they landed at Anzac Cove on 22 August. The battalion fought its first battle on the same day, staging an attack on the Turkish-held Hill 60. The engagement lasted until 29 August, with half of the battalion becoming casualties, and Maxwell briefly assuming the duties of a stretcher bearer.

Maxwell served on Gallipoli with his unit until 2 December, when he was admitted to 5th Field Ambulance and evacuated from the peninsula suffering from jaundice. Admitted to 3rd Auxiliary Hospital, Heliopolis, he remained there until 11 December, when he was posted to a convalescent camp at Ras el Tin. He rejoined the 18th Battalion on 5 January 1916, which had been evacuated from the Gallipoli Peninsula on 20 December the previous year and posted to Egypt. On 4 February, Maxwell was admitted to the Australian Dermatological Hospital, Abbassia with venereal disease. He returned to his battalion four days before it embarked for France, and the Western Front on 18 March.

Arriving in Marseille, France, Maxwell was admitted to 7th Australian Field Ambulance and then transferred to the 3rd Canadian General Hospital following wounds sustained during battle. He was moved to the 1st Convalescent Depot on 2 May, and then discharged to Base Details eleven days later. He was later found guilty of breaking ranks at the 07:30 parade on the same day and being absent without leave from 08:00 until 13:00 on 24 May; for this transgression, he was reduced to the ranks. Rejoining his battalion on 1 June, he took part in the Battle of Pozières and received a promotion to sergeant in October.

Suffering synovitis to his right knee, Maxwell was hospitalised for two days and posted to a training battalion in England on 28 November 1916. He stayed there for five months before embarking for France on 9 May 1917 and rejoining the 18th Battalion five days later. Maxwell was only briefly in France before being selected for officer training. Shortly after arriving in England, he attended a boisterous party with a group of soldiers. The military police raided the party and called the local police for assistance after confronting Maxwell's group. Maxwell was fined £20 and sent back to his unit for his actions.

=== Western Front: May 1917 to August 1918 ===
Maxwell was again selected for officer training, and on 5 July, he was posted to No. 6 Officers' Cadet Battalion. He was promoted to company sergeant major on 7 August, before rejoining the 18th Battalion on 11 September. Nine days later, he was engaged in action near Westhoek during the Third Battle of Ypres when he performed the deeds that earned him the Distinguished Conduct Medal. In the battle, the commander of a platoon was killed; Maxwell took command and led it into attack. Noticing that one of the newly captured positions was under heavy fire, Maxwell dashed to it and led the men to a safer and more tactically secure position, thus minimizing casualties.

Commissioned in the field as a second lieutenant on 29 September 1917, Maxwell took part in the engagements around Poelcappelle, Belgium, the following month. He earned promotion to lieutenant on 1 January 1918 and was admitted to the 7th Australian Field Ambulance on 10 January suffering scabies. Having been discharged from the hospital, he rejoined the 18th Battalion on 17 January.

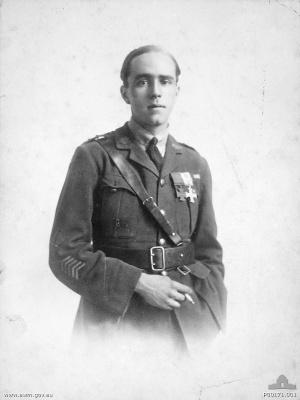
Studio portrait of Lt. J. Maxwell

On 8 March 1918, Maxwell commanded a scouting patrol that was operating to the east of Ploegsteert. Having obtained the required information, he ordered the patrol to withdraw. He and three of his men were covering the withdrawal of the main body when he noticed about thirty Germans nearby. Recalling the patrol, he led an attack against the party, which had sheltered in an old trench; the Germans quickly withdrew, leaving three dead and one wounded prisoner of war. Maxwell was awarded the Military Cross for his actions during this engagement, news of which was published in a supplement to the London Gazette on 13 May 1918.

Throughout the spring of 1918, the 18th Battalion was involved in operations to repel the German offensive. Maxwell took part in these actions until he was granted leave and went back to England on 17 July. He returned to France and rejoined the 18th Battalion on 1 August, before taking part in the Battle of Amiens where he was to earn a Bar to his Military Cross. On 9 August, the battalion was preparing to attack near Rainecourt. Maxwell took command of the company after all of its other officers became casualties. Under his leadership, the company was able to attack on time, despite being subjected to heavy fire. A tank that preceded the advance immediately became the object of enemy fire and was knocked out by a 77 mm gun. Maxwell, who was in close proximity, rushed over and opened the hatch, allowing the crew to escape. After escorting the tank commander to safety, Maxwell returned to lead the company in the attack, which succeeded in reaching and consolidating their objective. The award of the bar was published in a supplement to the London Gazette on 1 February 1919.

=== Victoria Cross, October 1918 to repatriation, August 1919 ===
On 3 October 1918, the 5th Brigade—of which the 18th Battalion was part—became engaged in its last battle of the First World War when breaching the Hindenburg Line close to Beaurevoir and Montbrehain. While taking part in this battle, Maxwell was a member of the attacking party along the Beaurevoir-Fonsomme line when he performed the acts for which he was awarded the Victoria Cross.

Early in the advance, Maxwell's company commander was severely wounded, resulting in Maxwell assuming control. Reaching the German barbwire defences under intense machine-gun fire, the company suffered heavy casualties, including all of the officers except Maxwell. Pushing forward alone through a narrow passageway in the wire, Maxwell captured the most dangerous machine gun, killed three Germans and took another four as prisoners; thereby enabling the company to move through the wire and reach their objective. Shortly afterwards, it was noticed that the company on their left flank was held up and failing to advance. Gathering a party of men, Maxwell led the group in an attempt to attack the German force from the rear. They soon came under heavy machine gun fire, and, single-handedly, Maxwell dashed forward and attacked the foremost gun. Firing his revolver, he managed to shoot five of the crew and silence the gun.

Later in the advance, Maxwell learnt from an English-speaking prisoner that a group of Germans in the adjacent post wished to surrender, but were afraid to give themselves up. Accompanied by two privates and the prisoner—who was to act as an interpreter—Maxwell approached the post. The three Australians, however, were immediately surrounded by a group of twenty German soldiers and disarmed. They seemed set to become prisoners themselves, before an artillery barrage fell on the position. Taking advantage of the resulting confusion, Maxwell pulled out a concealed revolver and shot two of the Germans before escaping with his men under heavy rifle fire; one of the privates was subsequently wounded. Organising a party of men, he immediately attacked and captured the post.

The full citation for Maxwell's Victoria Cross appeared in a supplement to the London Gazette on 6 January 1919, it read:

War Office, 6th January, 1919

His Majesty the KING has been graciously pleased to approve of the award of the Victoria Cross to the undermentioned Officers, Non-commissioned Officers and Men: —

Lt. Joseph Maxwell, M.C., D.C.M., 18th Bn., A.I.F.

For most conspicuous bravery and leadership in attack on the Beaurevoir-Fonsomme line near Estrees, North of St. Quentin, on the 3rd October, 1918.

His company commander was severely wounded early in the advance, and Lt. Maxwell at once took charge. The enemy wire when reached under intense fire was found to be exceptionally strong and closely supported by machine guns, whereupon Lt. Maxwell pushed forward single-handed through the wire and captured the most dangerous gun, killing three and capturing four enemy. He thus enabled his company to penetrate the wire and reach the objective. Later, he again dashed forward and silenced, single-handed, a gun which was holding up a flank company. Subsequently, when with two men only he attempted to capture a strong party of the enemy, he handled a most involved situation very skilfully, and it was due to his resource that he and his comrades escaped.

Throughout the day Lt. Maxwell set a high example of personal bravery, coupled with excellent judgment and quick decision.

The 18th Battalion was training away from the frontline when the Armistice was declared on 11 November 1918. On 8 March 1919, Maxwell was invested with his Victoria Cross by King George V in the ballroom of Buckingham Palace. He headed for Australia on 1 May aboard HT China, disembarking at Melbourne on 8 June and proceeding to Sydney, where he was discharged from the Australian Imperial Force on 20 August.

== Later life ==
Following demobilisation, Maxwell worked as a gardener in Canberra, Moree and the Maitland district. Having described himself as a reporter, Maxwell married 19-year-old tailoress Mabel Maxwell (unrelated) in a Catholic ceremony at Bellevue Hill, Sydney on 14 February 1921. The marriage produced a daughter, Jean, before being dissolved in 1926 upon Mabel's instigation.

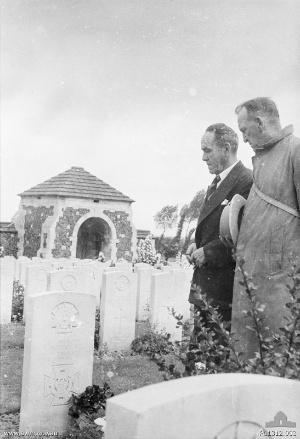
Joseph Maxwell (left) and John Patrick Hamilton (right) visit the grave of fellow Australian VC recipient Lewis McGee in Passchendaele, Belgium.

On 11 November 1929, Maxwell attended the New South Wales Dinner for recipients of the Victoria Cross in Sydney, and 1932 saw the publication of Hell's Bells and Mademoiselles, a book written in collaboration with Hugh Buggy about his experiences in the war. At the time, Maxwell was working as a gardener with the Department of the Interior in Canberra. The book was a success, but Maxwell soon spent what money he made from it. In the late 1930s, he wrote the manuscript for a second book entitled From the Hindenburg Line to the Breadline. The book was never published and the manuscript was lost when it was lent to someone to read.

In 1933, Maxwell acted as a defence witness in the trial of Alfred Jamieson, who was accused of housebreaking. Maxwell was Jamieson's former platoon commander and testified that Jamieson had been of good character but had been strongly affected by the war.

After the outbreak of the Second World War, Maxwell made several attempts to enlist, but was unsuccessful due to his age, and deteriorating health. He eventually travelled to Queensland, where he enlisted under the alias of Joseph Wells on 27 June 1940. However, his identity was soon discovered and he was given a training position; dissatisfied, he took his discharge on 9 September 1940.

In 1952, Maxwell joined the contingent of Victoria Cross recipients invited to the coronation of Queen Elizabeth II. On 6 March 1956, describing himself as a journalist from Bondi, Maxwell married widow Anne Martin, née Burton, in Sydney. Three years later, he attended the Victoria Cross centenary celebrations in London, before later re-visiting the battlefields in France. In 1964, together with his wife, Maxwell attended the opening of the VC Corner in the Australian War Memorial, Canberra. He was determined that his Victoria Cross would not wind up in the collection, believing that the award would be devalued by "lumping" them together.

On 6 July 1967, Maxwell collapsed and died of a heart attack in a street in his home town Matraville, New South Wales. He had been an invalid pensioner for some time. His funeral service took place with full military honours at St Mathias Anglican Church, Paddington. Having been cremated, his ashes were interred at the Eastern Suburbs Crematorium in Botany. Anne Maxwell presented her husband's medals to the Army Museum of New South Wales at Victoria Barracks, Paddington, and subsequently the medals, together with a portrait and a brass copy of his VC citation, were unveiled by the Minister of Defence, Allan Fairhall. In 2003, Maxwell's medals were presented to the Australian War Memorial on a permanent loan basis.
