= Jack Wilson (Yorkshire cricketer) =

John Philip Wilson, DSC, AFC (3 April 1889 – 3 October 1959) was an English amateur first-class cricketer, a decorated World War I pilot and winner of the Grand National in 1925.

== Early life ==
He was born in April 1889 at Gilling Castle in the North Riding of Yorkshire. He was educated at Harrow School, London, England.

== Cricket ==
He made his debut for Yorkshire County Cricket Club against Leicestershire in the County Championship in August 1911, one of six matches he played for the county that month. He played against the touring South Africans and Worcestershire in August the following year, and against the Marylebone Cricket Club (MCC) in September to round out his nine match Yorkshire first-class career. His final two matches came for H. D. G. Leveson-Gower's XI against Oxford and Cambridge Universities at The Saffrons, Eastbourne, in the final summer before the start of World War I.

He was not prolific in the first-class arena. His best innings was a knock of 36 against Middlesex at Bradford, while his solitary first-class wicket was that of J. W. Hitch, the Surrey and England all-rounder. He also played for the Yorkshire Second XI, and in country house cricket for the Yorkshire Gentlemen.

== Military service ==
John Philip Wilson
- Born: 3 April 1889; Gilling Castle, North Riding of Yorkshire, England
- Died: 3 October 1959 (aged 70); Tickton, Beverley, East Riding of Yorkshire, England
- Military career
- Allegiance: United Kingdom
- Branch: Royal Navy; Royal Air Force
- Service years: 1914–1919
- Rank: Major
- Nickname: Jack
- Conflicts: World War I
- Awards: Distinguished Service Cross; Air Force Cross

After gaining his pilots licence on a Vickers biplane at Brooklands in June 1914, he was commissioned into the Royal Naval Air Service on the outbreak of war as a probationary flight sub-lieutenant, being confirmed in his rank on 16 September, and was promoted to flight lieutenant on 31 December. In April 1915 he attacked two German submarines lying at anchor alongside the Mole at Zeebrugge with four bombs "with successful results." Later that summer, on 7 June he attacked the Zeppelin shed at Evere, north of Brussels in a daring night attack, a mission for which he and his co-pilot J. S. Mills, were awarded the Distinguished Service Cross. On 1 January 1916, Wilson was promoted to flight commander, and on 31 December to squadron commander. He was made a Chevalier of the Belgian Order of the Crown on 29 August 1917. On 1 April 1918, the Royal Naval Air Service was merged with the Army's Royal Flying Corps to form the Royal Air Force, and Wilson joined the new service with the equivalent rank of major. In the 1919 New Year Honours, announced on 1 January 1919, he was awarded the Air Force Cross "in recognition of distinguished service". On 22 March 1919 Wilson relinquished his commission "on account of ill-health". He was allowed to retain his rank.

== Post-war life ==
Although he continued in club cricket after the war, his new claim to fame came as an amateur steeplechase jockey. He rode more than 200 winners, rode in Grand National three times, and won on Double Chance in 1925.

He died in October 1959 in Tickton, Beverley, East Riding of Yorkshire.

== Personal life ==
In 1915 he married Louisa Harrison-Broadley. His wife's elder sister was married to Stanley Jackson, former England cricket captain; Jackson thus became Wilson's brother-in-law.
