= Hugh Buggy =

Australian sports journalist (1896–1974)

Edward Hugh Buggy (9 June 1896 – 18 June 1974) was a leading journalist well known as an Australian rules football writer covering the Victorian Football League (renamed in 1989 Australian Football League).

Born at Seymour, Victoria in 1896, Buggy attended school there before moving to Melbourne with his mother after the death of his father. He commenced his journalism career at the South Melbourne Record, and joined the Melbourne Argus in 1917. He studied for the diploma of journalism at the university in 1921. He was gifted with a photographic memory.

== Journalist ==
Although he was deputy news editor of the Sydney Sun for five years, Buggy preferred the role of reporter. He was closely involved in reporting many of the dramatic events of his time such as the fatal shoot-out between Squizzy Taylor and 'Snowy' Cutmore in 1927 and the arrival in Brisbane of Kingsford-Smith and the Southern Cross in 1928. In 1932, following the opening of the Sydney Harbour Bridge, he was the only reporter to gain an interview with Captain Francis de Groot.

Buggy was much travelled during his journalism career, working for several Sydney and Melbourne based newspapers. Leaving the Argus during 1923, Buggy worked for the new Melbourne Evening Sun in 1923–25, then moved to the Sydney Sun in 1925–27, 1928–31 and 1937–42, The Sun News-Pictorial in 1927 and the Melbourne Herald in 1932–37. In 1950 he rejoined the Argus, and became its chief football-writer in 1951. After the Argus ceased publication in 1957, he worked for various Melbourne suburban newspapers and contributed to the Catholic newspaper, the Advocate, and as chief court reporter for The Truth for three years.

== Censor ==
During World War II he was chief operational censor at General Douglas MacArthur's headquarters in 1942–46. From 1946 to 1950 he was an editor with Radio Australia.

== Author ==
He ghost wrote for Sir Charles Kingsford Smith and Charles Ulm the Story of the Southern Cross Trans-Pacific Flight in 1928, and for Joe Maxwell V.C., M.C. & Bar, D.C.M the World War I recounting of his experiences Hells Bells and Mademoiselles in 1932, then in 1946 he wrote Pacific Victory.

In 1977 his book The Real John Wren was published.

== Sport journalism ==
Buggy was also a highly respected writer on sport, particularly Australian rules football, although he covered a variety of sports. He had a flair for the picturesque sporting phrase: he was widely believed to have coined the term 'bodyline' during the 1932/33 Ashes Test cricket series, but this claim was never settled conclusively.

He became chief football-writer at The Argus in 1951, and served in the role until The Argus ceased publication in 1957.

== Death ==
Buggy married twice, but both marriages ended in divorce and were childless. He died following a heart seizure on 18 June 1974 and was buried in Seymour.

== Hall of Fame ==
Buggy was inducted to the Australian Football Hall of Fame in 1996, with his citation reading:

Joined The Argus newspaper in 1917 and became a highly respected football writer. Became its chief football writer in 1951, after gaining wider experience elsewhere. Worked for suburban newspapers and continued to write football for the Advocate. Wrote several important club histories, including one on Carlton.

== Works ==
- Buggy, H., Hugh Buggy's Murder Book: True Crime Stories by a Famous Reporter, Argus & Australasian Ltd., (Melbourne), 1948?
- Buggy, H., Let's Look at Football, Argus, (Melbourne), 1952.
- Buggy, H., Pacific Victory: A Short History of Australia's Part in the War against Japan, Victorian Railway Printing Works, (North Melbourne), 1945.
- Buggy, H., The Real John Wren, Widescope, (Camberwell), 1977. ISBN 0-86932-031-9
- Buggy, H. & Bell, H., The Carlton Story: A History of the Carlton Football Club, Eric White Associates, (Melbourne), 1958.
- Buggy, H., Taylor, P. & Banfield, P., Football Headlines: Great Men and Great Moments of the Australian Game, Argus and Australasian Ltd., (Melbourne), 1955.
- Kingsford-Smith, C.E. & Ulm, C.T.P., Story of the "Southern Cross" Trans-Pacific Flight, 1928, Penlington & Somerville, 1928.
- Ross, J. (ed.), The Australian Football Hall of Fame, HarperCollinsPublishers, (Pymble), 1999. ISBN 0-7322-6426-X
