= Lance Gun =

Australian cricketer and lawyer

Personal information
- Full name: Lancelot Townsend Gun
- Born: 13 April 1903; Port Adelaide, South Australia, Australia
- Died: 25 May 1958 (aged 55); North Adelaide, South Australia
- Batting: Left-handed
- Bowling: Right-arm fast-medium

Domestic team information
- Years: Team
- 1924-25 to 1926-27: South Australia

Career statistics
| Competition | First-class |
|---|---|
| Matches | 8 |
| Runs scored | 552 |
| Batting average | 46.00 |
| 100s/50s | 2/3 |
| Top score | 136 not out |
| Balls bowled | 88 |
| Wickets | 2 |
| Bowling average | 19.00 |
| 5 wickets in innings | 0 |
| 10 wickets in match | 0 |
| Best bowling | 2/38 |
| Catches/stumpings | 2/0 |
- Source: Cricinfo, 2 November 2019

Lancelot Townsend Gun (13 April 1903 – 25 May 1958) was an Australian first-class cricketer and lawyer. He is believed to have been the first bowler to use bodyline tactics.

== Law career ==
Lance Gun was educated at St Peter's College, Adelaide, and the University of Adelaide, where he studied law. He was formally admitted to the legal profession in April 1925, joining his brother's law firm of Nelligan & Gun, which later became Gun & Gun.

== Cricket career ==
=== First match and bodyline bowling ===
Lance Gun was a left-handed batsman. He made his first-class debut at the age of 21 for South Australia in the Sheffield Shield match against New South Wales at the Adelaide Oval in January 1925. On the first day he batted at number seven, going to the wicket when South Australia were 5 for 122, and scoring 136 not out, taking the total to 389 all out.

On the second day, when New South Wales batted, Les Gwynne (also making his first-class debut) and Tommy Andrews were building a steady partnership for the third wicket against mediocre bowling when South Australia's captain Vic Richardson asked Gun to bowl. Gun set a bodyline field of seven fieldsmen on the leg side, including five behind square and one at forward short leg. Bowling right-arm fast-medium over the wicket to the right-handed batsmen, he proceeded to bowl short-pitched deliveries at the batsmen or just outside the line of leg stump. Andrews disdained to play strokes against such deliveries, but was surprised by a fuller ball from Gun that bowled him off his pads. Despite not quite knowing how to treat Gun's bowling, Gwynne reached his century, but was later dismissed by Gun, caught after skying the ball. Richardson then took Gun off, and he never bowled again in first-class cricket.

=== Later career ===
Gun's law career took precedence over his cricket, and his playing career was sporadic and brief. He made one more century for South Australia: against Western Australia in 1925-26 he made 129, putting on 313 in less than four hours for the opening partnership with Arthur Richardson. It was a record opening partnership for South Australia.

== Other sports ==
Gun played Australian rules football for North Adelaide and Glenelg. He was also a champion contract bridge player.

== Personal life ==
Gun married Monica Flannagan in Adelaide in October 1928.
