= Charles Morrissey =

Australian rugby union player

- Born: Charles Vincent Morrissey; 26 April 1903 "Quat Quatta" Corowa, NSW
- Died: 20 February 1930 (aged 26) Qurindi NSW
- School: St ignatius college
- Occupation: Grazier

Rugby union career
- Position: centre
International career
Years	Team	Apps	(Points)
1925–26	Wallabies	5	(3)

Charles Vincent Morrissey (26 April 1903 – 20 February 1938) was a rugby union player who represented Australia.

Morrissey, a centre, was born in Singleton and claimed a total of 5 international rugby caps for Australia. He was the first captain of Wanderers RFC in Newcastle, NSW which was formed in 1925 having originally been established as GPS Old Boys in 1924.

He also played six first-class cricket matches for New South Wales between 1924/25 and 1925/26.

== See also ==
- List of New South Wales representative cricketers
