= Norman Rock =

Australian cricketer

Personal information
- Born: 30 August 1864; Deloraine, Tasmania, Australia
- Died: 7 February 1945 (aged 80); Brighton, Victoria, Australia

Domestic team information
- Years: Team
- 1890-1894: Tasmania
- Source: Cricinfo, 14 January 2016

Norman Rock (30 August 1864 – 7 February 1945) was an Australian cricketer. He played two first-class matches for Tasmania between 1890 and 1894.

== See also ==
- List of Tasmanian representative cricketers
