= Isabel Rock =

American politician (died 1971)

Member of the Connecticut House of Representatives from Wilton
- In office 1961–1967
- Preceded by: Morris Earle
- Succeeded by: Seat eliminated

Member of the Connecticut House of Representatives from the 162nd district
- In office 1967–1969
- Preceded by: Seat created
- Succeeded by: Edward S. Rimer Jr.

Personal details
- Born: Isabel Kline; 1889 or 1890 Jersey City, New Jersey, U.S.
- Died: October 3, 1971 (aged 81) Norwalk, Connecticut, U.S.
- Party: Republican
- Spouse: P. Arthur Rock (died 1960)
- Children: 2
- Education: Goucher College

Isabel Rock (died October 3, 1971) was an American politician who served in the Connecticut House of Representatives from 1961 to 1969. A Republican, she represented the town of Wilton from 1961 to 1967, and the 162nd district from 1967 to 1969.

== Personal life ==
Rock was born Isabel Kline in Jersey City, New Jersey. She graduated from Goucher College in Towson, Maryland, and moved to Connecticut in 1936. She was married to P. Arthur Rock until his death in 1960, and together, they had two sons.

Rock died on October 3, 1971, in Norwalk, Connecticut. She was 81.

== Political career ==
A Republican, Rock was first elected to the Connecticut House of Representatives in 1960, and she represented the town of Wilton until 1967. Though only formally elected to two terms of two years each, she remained in her seat until 1967 due to Connecticut's 1964 redistricting. Following the court decision Butterworth v. Dempsey, Connecticut's apportionment was ruled unconstitutional, and the state was federally mandated to eliminate its single-town electoral districts. When the General Assembly failed to redistrict in time, Connecticut was ordered to cancel its 1964 House election, and the legislature elected in 1962 was ultimately held over until 1967 due to a lengthy impasse.

In 1966, after the state successfully redistricted, Rock ran for reelection and was elected to the newly established 162nd district, where she would serve one term. She did not run for reelection in 1968 and was succeeded by fellow Republican Edward S. Rimer Jr.

Rock was a member of the Order of Women Legislators and the National Society of State Legislators.
