= Jack Rymill =

Australian cricketer

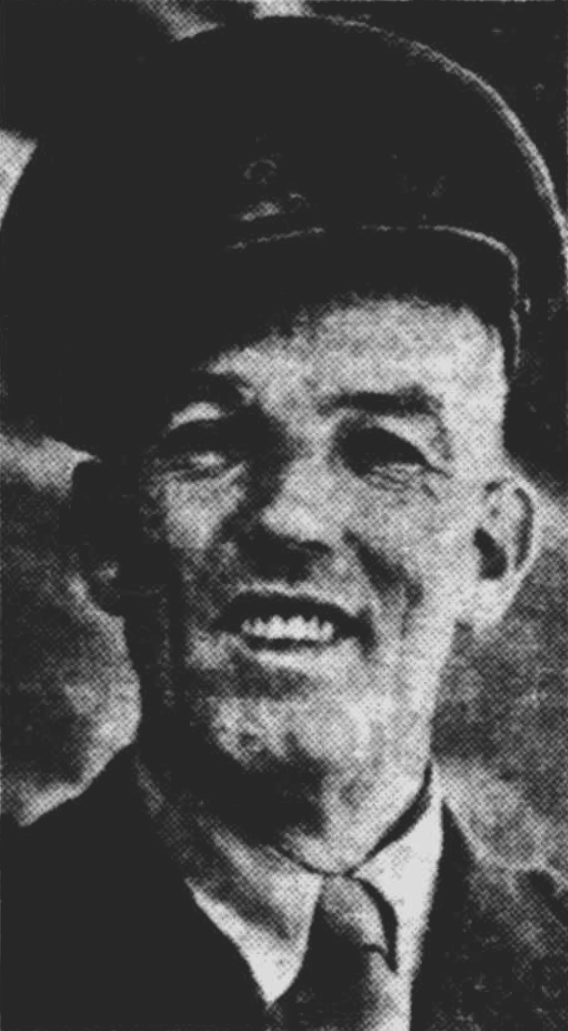

Personal information
- Born: 20 March 1901; Adelaide, Australia
- Died: 11 February 1976 (aged 74)
- Source: Cricinfo, 25 September 2020

Jack Rymill (20 March 1901 – 11 February 1976) was an Australian cricketer. He played in twenty-two first-class matches for South Australia between 1921 and 1927.

== See also ==
- List of South Australian representative cricketers
