= 1925 Grand National =

English steeplechase horse race

- Grand National
- Location: Aintree Racecourse
- Date: 27 March 1925
- Winning horse: Double Chance
- Starting price: 100/9
- Jockey: (England) Maj. John Wilson
- Trainer: Fred Archer, Jr.
- Owner: David Goold
- Conditions: Good

External videos
- Silent highlights of the 1925 Grand National (British Pathé)

The 1925 Grand National was the 84th renewal of the Grand National horse race that took place at Aintree near Liverpool, England, on 27 March 1925.

The race was won by Double Chance, a 100/9 shot ridden by jockey Major John Wilson and trained by Fred Archer Jr. for owner David Goold.

Old Tay Bridge finished in second place, Fly Mask was third and future winner Sprig completed the course in fourth position. Thirty-three horses ran and all returned safely to the stables. One jockey was injured at the water-jump (16th fence) as his horse fell on him.

1925 was the first year a tape, known then as a 'gate', was used at the start line.

== Finishing Order ==
Position	Name	Jockey	Age	Handicap (st-lb)	SP	Distance
01	Double Chance	Major John Wilson	9	10-9	100/9	4 Lengths
02	Old Tay Bridge	Jack Anthony	11	11-12	9/1	
03	Fly Mask	Edward Doyle	11	11-11	10/1	
04	Sprig	Ted Leader	8	11-2	33/1	
05	Silvo	Dick Rees	9	12-7	10/1	
06	Dwarf of the Forest	Mr Harry Kennard	8	10-8	66/1	
07	Jack Horner	Mr Morgan Blair	8	10-0	40/1	
08	Max	James Hogan jnr	9	11-5	20/1	
09	Drifter	Billy Watkinson	11	10-3	20/1	

== Non-finishers ==
Fence	Name	Jockey	Age	Handicap (st-lb)	SP	Fate
07	Sergeant Murphy	Tony Escott	15	11-7	33/1	Fell
01	Alcazar	Squadron Leader Ridley	9	12-3	50/1	Fell
?	Music Hall	Bilbie Rees	12	12-0	66/1	Refused
?	Ballinode	G Fitzgibbon	9	11-6	10/1	Fell
?	White Surrey	Michael Tighe	12	11-4	66/1	Fell
?	Ben Cruchan	Mr William Whitbread	11	11-2	40/1	Fell
07	Ardeen	Len Lefebve	8	11-2	28/1	Fell
?	Arravale	J Meaney	10	11-0	66/1	Pulled Up
?	Winnall	Fred Gurney	8	11-0	28/1	Refused
02	Patsey V	Mr B Lemon	?	?	25/1	Refused
?	Ammonal	Bob Trudgill	8	10-10	66/1	Pulled Up
?	His Luck	Roger Burford snr	9	10-10	50/1	Fell
02	Taffytus	Bob Lyall	12	10-9	40/1	Refused
?	Thrown In	Jack Goswell	9	10-8	28/1	Fell
16	Gracious Gift	Billy Parvin	10	10-8	25/1	Fell
?	Keep Cool	G Green	10	10-7	33/1	Pulled Up
?	Mainsail	R Prioleau	9	10-5	66/1	Fell
?	Pencoed	Mr D Thomas	10	10-3	33/1	Fell
?	Ballymacrory	Jack Moylan	8	10-3	33/1	Fell
?	Rousham	Mr P Dennis	10	10-0	66/1	Fell
?	All White	James Mason	11	10-0	66/1	Fell
?	Peter The Piper	G Turner	13	10-0	40/1	Refused
?	Gardenrath	T James	10	10-0	66/1	Fell
?	James Pigg	A Robson	?	?	66/1	Fell
