= Herbert Gamble =

Australian cricketer (1903–1962)

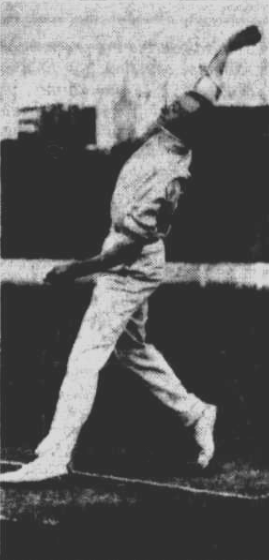

Personal information
- Full name: Herbert Spencer Gamble
- Born: 2 March 1903; Sunbury, Victoria, Australia
- Died: 15 June 1962 (aged 59); Shorncliffe, Queensland, Australia

Domestic team information
- Years: Team
- 1923-1929: Victoria
- 1931-1934: Queensland
- Source: Cricinfo, 20 November 2015

Herbert Spencer Gamble (2 March 1903 – 15 June 1962) was an Australian cricketer. He played seven first-class cricket matches for Victoria between 1923 and 1929 and thirteen for Queensland between 1931 and 1934. He played for Hawthorn-East Melbourne in Victorian district cricket and Eastern Suburbs in Queensland district cricket.

== See also ==
- List of Victoria first-class cricketers
- List of Queensland first-class cricketers
