= 1925 Currie Cup =

Domestic rugby union competition

- Countries: South Africa
- Champions: Western Province (11th title)

The 1925 Currie Cup was the 14th edition of the Currie Cup, the premier domestic rugby union competition in South Africa.

The tournament was won by Western Province for the 11th time.

== See also ==
- Currie Cup
