= Ballinode (horse) =

Irish-bred Thoroughbred racehorse

- Sire: Machakos
- Grandsire: Desmond
- Dam: Celia
- Damsire: Veles
- Sex: Mare
- Foaled: 1916
- Country: Ireland
- Colour: Chestnut
- Owner: Christopher Bentley
- Trainer: Frank Morgan

Major wins
- Grand Sefton Steeplechase (1924); Cheltenham Gold Cup (1925)

Ballinode (foaled 1916) was an Irish racehorse who won the 1925 Cheltenham Gold Cup. She was the first mare and the first Irish-trained horse to win the race. She was known as "The Sligo Mare."

== Background ==
Ballinode was a chestnut mare bred in Ireland. She was one of the few horses of any consequence sired by Machakos, a son of the Coventry Stakes winner Desmond. Ballinode's dam, Celia, was a half-sister to the Ascot Gold Cup winner Love Wisely. During her racing career she was owned by Christopher Bentley and trained in Ireland by Frank Morgan. The mare was named after a village in County Sligo where Bentley lived.

== Racing career ==
In her early racing career Ballinode won several races in Ireland, acquiring a reputation for being fast but making occasional jumping errors. In March 1924 she was sent to the Cheltenham Festival for the first time and finished second in the National Hunt Handicap Chase A month later she finished eighth in the Grand National. In the following season she returned to Britain for the autumn meeting at Aintree Racecourse and won the Grand Sefton Steeplechase, beating Ardeen into second place. She won again at Nottingham Racecourse in February 1925. On 11 March 1925 she was one of four horses to contest the second running of the Cheltenham Gold Cup and started the 3/1 second favourite. The other three runners were the odds-on favourite Alcazar, the 1924 runner-up Conjuror and the National Hunt Chase winner Patsey V. Ridden by Ted Leader the Irish mare settled in second place behind Alcazar and the pair soon drew well clear of the other two runners. Ballinode took the lead at the second last and won very easily by five lengths. Eighteen days later the mare started 10/1 second favourite for the Grand National but failed to complete the course.

== Assessment and honours ==
In their book, A Century of Champions, based on the Timeform rating system, John Randall and Tony Morris rated Ballinode a "poor" Gold Cup winner. She is remembered in the name of Ballinode Close, a residential street in Cheltenham.

== Pedigree ==
Pedigree of Ballinode (IRE), chestnut mare, 1916
Sire Machakos (IRE) 1903	Desmond (GB); 1896	St Simon	Galopin
Sire Machakos (IRE) 1903	Desmond (GB); 1896	St Simon	St Angela
Sire Machakos (IRE) 1903	Desmond (GB); 1896	L'Abbesse de Jouarre	Trappist
Sire Machakos (IRE) 1903	Desmond (GB); 1896	L'Abbesse de Jouarre	Festa
Sire Machakos (IRE) 1903	Canterbury Belle (GB); 1894	Tristan	Hermit
Sire Machakos (IRE) 1903	Canterbury Belle (GB); 1894	Tristan	Thrift
Sire Machakos (IRE) 1903	Canterbury Belle (GB); 1894	Re-Echo	Reverberation
Sire Machakos (IRE) 1903	Canterbury Belle (GB); 1894	Re-Echo	Mabille
Dam Celia 1905	Veles (GB); 1898	Isinglass	Isonomy
Dam Celia 1905	Veles (GB); 1898	Isinglass	Dead Lock
Dam Celia 1905	Veles (GB); 1898	Velleda	Robert the Devil
Dam Celia 1905	Veles (GB); 1898	Velleda	Idun
Dam Celia 1905	Lovelorn (GB); 1888	Phillamon	Solon
Dam Celia 1905	Lovelorn (GB); 1888	Phillamon	Satanella
Dam Celia 1905	Lovelorn (GB); 1888	Gone	The Lizard
Dam Celia 1905	Lovelorn (GB); 1888	Gone	Vanish (Family 11-e)
