= Les Gwynne =

Australian cricketer

Personal information
- Full name: Leslie William Gwynne
- Born: 26 January 1893; Sydney, Australia
- Died: 25 October 1962 (aged 69); Keith, South Australia, Australia
- Source: ESPNcricinfo, 30 December 2016

Les Gwynne (26 January 1893 – 25 October 1962) was an Australian cricketer. He played five first-class matches for New South Wales between 1924/25 and 1926/27.

== See also ==
- List of New South Wales representative cricketers
