= Owen Rock =

Australian doctor and cricketer

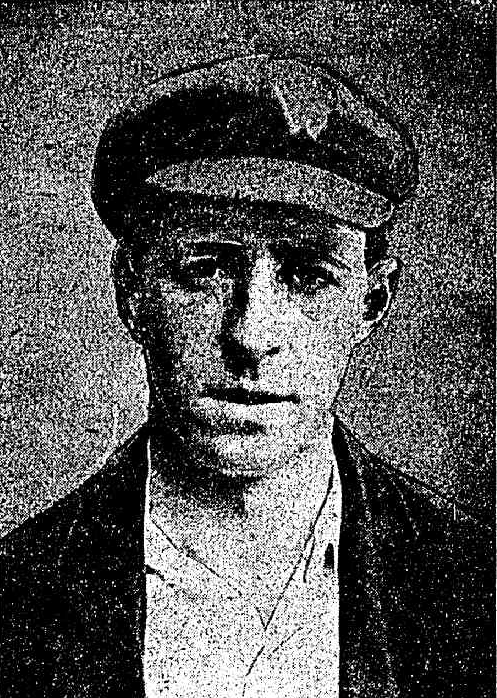
- Owen Rock in 1924

Personal information
- Full name: Harry Owen Rock
- Born: 18 October 1896; Scone, New South Wales, Australia
- Died: 9 March 1978 (aged 81); Manly, Sydney
- Batting: Right-handed
- Role: Batsman
- Relatives: Claude Rock (father)

Career statistics
Competition	First-class
Matches	6
Runs scored	758
Batting average	94.75
100s/50s	3/2
Top score	235
Catches/stumpings	1/–
- Source: CricketArchive, 24 February 2015

Harry Owen Rock (18 October 1896 – 9 March 1978) was an Australian medical practitioner and a cricketer who played first-class cricket for New South Wales between 1924 and 1926. He was born at Scone, New South Wales and died at Manly, Sydney, also in New South Wales. Rock was educated at The King's School, Parramatta from 1910 to 1916 where he captained the First XI cricket team for three years 1914-16.

The son of the Cambridge University and Tasmania cricketer Claude Rock, Owen Rock had a brief but dramatic first-class cricket career as a right-handed batsman in which he finished with a batting average of 94.75. "Slightly built, he was a tremendous driver and had a wonderful gift of placing the ball and a basic soundness of technique which enabled him, as an opening batsman, to score at a great pace without taking undue risks," Wisden Cricketers' Almanack wrote of him in its obituary in 1979.

Rock played in minor matches against the 1920–21 England team and the 1922–23 Marylebone Cricket Club side. But his first-class debut did not come until, at the age of 28, he was picked to open the batting in the absence of some of New South Wales' Test stars for the Sheffield Shield game against South Australia in November 1924; he scored 127 in 140 minutes with 14 fours in his first innings and an unbeaten 27 in the second innings. He did not play in the return match at Adelaide in January 1925, but with the Test stars absent on Test duty later that month, he was picked for the game against Victoria at Sydney and proceeded to make 235, putting on 202 for the first wicket with Gordon Morgan and 268 for the third wicket with Alan Kippax. He was top-scorer with 51 in the second innings of this match as well, and at this point had scored 440 runs at an average of 146.66. The return match with Victoria at the Melbourne Cricket Ground followed immediately on from this game, but Test players Herbie Collins, Warren Bardsley, Tommy Andrews and Charlie Kelleway were all available for that, so Rock did not play. Later in the season, he was picked for the New South Wales team to play the England touring team but he withdrew from the side at a late stage; newspaper reports which called him "University batsman H. O. Rock" said his withdrawal from the side was "unexpected". But another report cited a university examination as the cause.

In the 1925-26 season, Rock was picked for his third first-class match for New South Wales, a non-Sheffield Shield game against Western Australia, and duly scored his third century in as many matches, an innings of 151. Newspaper comment after this game saw Rock as "a fine asset to the State" with implicit criticism of the State cricket team selectors for failing to pick him regularly: "For several seasons past Rock has shown great form with the bat, but has received little recognition by the State selectors." Rock next appeared in an "Australian XI v The Rest" match which was essentially a trial game for the forthcoming 1926 Australian tour to England; he scored 12 and 35 in this game and was for the first time overshadowed by other players who did better. But his subsequent omission from the New South Wales side to play South Australia in Adelaide caused heavy criticism. A columnist in the Sydney Referee newspaper wrote that the omission was "the most extraordinary thing for many years" and "absolutely indefensible"; the selectors were "far too deeply wedded to the older players". Rock was, however, picked for the away and home fixtures against Victoria when New South Wales totalled more than 700 in the single innings of both games that were completed; batting at No 7 because of the inclusion of the state's regular openers, he scored 81 and 39, but those were the last innings of his first-class career.

In April 1926, along with fellow cricketing doctor Otto Nothling, Rock qualified in medicine and he took up a post as a doctor in Newcastle and played no further first-class cricket. More than 50 years on, Wisden suggested that, but for this career decision, "he must surely have ranked among the great".

== See also ==
- List of New South Wales representative cricketers
