= Edmund Wainwright =

Australian cricketer

Personal information
- Full name: Edmund George Chalwin Wainwright
- Born: 18 May 1903; North Adelaide, South Australia
- Died: 8 August 1995 (aged 92); North Geelong, Victoria,
- Batting: Left-handed
- Bowling: Leg break

Domestic team information
- Years: Team
- 1923/24–1925/26: South Australia
- Source: ESPNcricinfo, 13 December 2015

Edmund George Chalwin Wainwright (18 May 1903 – 8 August 1995) was an Australian cricketer. He was a left-handed batsman and a leg break bowler. In cricketing history, he was considered to be amongst those who resurrected South Australian cricket.

== Professional career ==
During the early part of his professional career, Wainwright worked as a wool clerk for Bennett & Fisher, one of Australia's largest wool-broking and livestock trading firms. After his active cricketing career, Wainwright became an auctioneer at Dalgety and Company Limited.

== Early sporting career ==
At sports, Wainwright was considered a skilled athlete in multiple disciplines. While studying at St. Peter's College, he not only captained the college cricket team, but also was a noteworthy player of the college football team. Wainwright also played for South Adelaide during the 1922-23 season. Standing over 6 feet tall, Wainwright was described as being "beautifully built" in a 1924 editorial in The Mail.

== Cricketing career ==
Wainwright was a left-hand batsman and bowled leg breaks. Wainwright played 9 first-class cricket matches for South Australia between 1923 and 1926, scoring 237 runs and taking 5 wickets. Wainwright was also frequently the opening batsman for South Australia. Wainwright's Sheffield Shield debut was in the timeless Test match between South Australia and Victoria held at Adelaide Oval from 15 to 20 February 1924. Later in his career, he also became captain of the Jamestown cricket club.

Wainwright was considered to be amongst those who attempted to resurrect South Australian cricket. The Mail editorial on 8 November 1924 described Wainwright and other players in the then South Australian team as follows: "These eleven names will go down into cricket history as belonging to the men who made a gallant attempt to rehabilitate South Australia in the eyes of the cricketing world. While these men were struggling for the honor of the State, South Australians were taking liberties with their names..."

== Death ==
Wainwright died on 8 August 1995 in Victoria, Australia at the age of 92.
