= South African cricket team in Australia in 1952–53 =

International cricket tour

The South Africa national cricket team toured Australia in the 1952–53 season and played five Test matches against Australia. The series was drawn 2–2, the first time a rubber between the two sides had not been won by Australia.

From Australia, the South African side moved on to play two Test matches, two other first-class matches and one minor match in New Zealand; see South African cricket team in New Zealand in 1952–53. On the return from New Zealand, the team played one further match against Western Australia in Perth.

On the Australian legs of the tour, including the Test matches, 16 first-class matches were played, of which four were won by the South Africans, three lost, and nine drawn. Of the six minor matches in Australia, three were won and three drawn. In New Zealand, one Test match was won by the South Africans, and all other matches were drawn.

== South African team ==
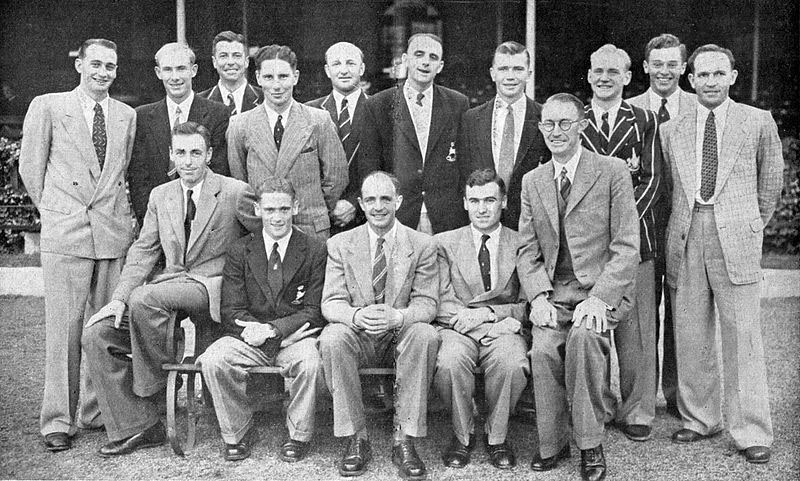
The South Africans who toured Australia and New Zealand in 1952–53.

The South African side was captained by Jack Cheetham. The manager was Ken Viljoen, who had retired from playing Test cricket only five years before. The full South African touring party was:

- Jack Cheetham, captain
- Jackie McGlew, vice-captain
- Russell Endean
- Eddie Fuller
- Ken Funston
- Gerald Innes
- Headley Keith
- Roy McLean
- Percy Mansell
- Michael Melle
- Anton Murray
- Eric Norton
- Hugh Tayfield
- John Waite
- John Watkins

Fuller, Funston, Innes, Keith, Murray and Norton had not previously played Test cricket; Fuller, Funston, Keith and Murray made their Test debuts during this series. Innes and Norton, the only two of the party of 15 not to play any Tests on this tour, in fact never played Test cricket.

== Test series ==
=== 1st Test ===
5–10 December 1952
Scorecard

Australia	v	South Africa
280 (81.5 overs); RN Harvey 109; MG Melle 6/71 (20.5 overs)		221 (62.6 overs); JHB Waite 39; DT Ring 6/72 (21 overs)
277 (98.3 overs); AR Morris 58; HJ Tayfield 4/116 (33.3 overs)		240 (107 overs); DJ McGlew 69; RR Lindwall 5/60 (30 overs)

Australia won by 96 runs
Brisbane Cricket Ground, Woolloongabba, Brisbane
Umpires: HAR Elphinstone and RJJ Wright

- Australia won the toss and elected to bat.
- KJ Funston and ARA Murray (both SA) made their Test debuts.

Melle, with six for 71, and Watkins (4/41) shared the wickets in Australia's first innings, in which a partnership of 155 for the second wicket between Neil Harvey (109) and Lindsay Hassett (55) provided the substance. Most of the South Africans made some runs, but Waite's 39 was the top score and Doug Ring's leg-spin brought him six wickets for 72 runs. Australia's second innings was also an even-scoring affair, with only Arthur Morris (58) and Harvey (52) passing 50. With Keith Miller unable to bowl because of a throat infection, Australia's attack looked "ordinary", said Wisden. But after 69 from McGlew and 65 from Funston, the other batsmen failed against the speed of Ray Lindwall, who took five wickets for 60 runs.

=== 2nd Test ===
24–30 December 1952
Scorecard

South Africa	v	Australia
227 (71.6 overs); ARA Murray 51; KR Miller 4/62 (21 overs)		243 (71.4 overs); CC McDonald 82; HJ Tayfield 6/84 (29.4 overs)
388 (128.5 overs); WR Endean 162; KR Miller 3/51 (22 overs)		290 (95.1 overs); RN Harvey 60; HJ Tayfield 7/81 (37.1 overs)

South Africa won by 82 runs
Melbourne Cricket Ground, Melbourne
Umpires: HAR Elphinstone and MJ McInnes

- South Africa won the toss and elected to bat.
- 25 and 28 December were taken as rest days

The first victory over Australia for 42 years looked unlikely at the halfway stage. South Africa's first innings total owed much to a late flourish from Murray, who made 51 after coming in with the score on 126 for seven. Colin McDonald made 82 and Miller 52, but Tayfield's off-breaks brought him six wickets for 84 runs and Mansell supported with his leg-spin, taking three for 58. South Africa's second innings was built on an innings of seven-and-a-half hours by Endean, who made 162 not out, sharing stands of 111 with Waite (62) for the second wicket and 65 with Funston (42) for the fourth. Most of the Australian batsmen got a start to an innings, but only Harvey, with 60, resisted Tayfield for long. A ninth wicket stand of 61 between Richie Benaud (45) and Ring (53) only delayed the inevitable. Tayfield finished with innings figures of seven for 81 and match figures of 13 for 165.

=== 3rd Test ===
9–13 January 1953
Scorecard

South Africa	v	Australia
173 (63.2 overs); KJ Funston 56; RR Lindwall 4/40 (14.2 overs)		443 (131.2 overs); RN Harvey 190; ARA Murray 4/169 (51.2 overs)
232 (69.6 overs); WR Endean 71; RR Lindwall 4/72 (20 overs)

Australia won by an innings and 38 runs
Sydney Cricket Ground, Sydney
Umpires: HAR Elphinstone and MJ McInnes

- South Africa won the toss and elected to bat.
- 11 January was taken as a rest day

Two wickets in an over for Lindwall put Australia on top on the first day, and only Funston, with 56, offered much resistance. The Australians lost two cheap wickets, but McDonald and Harvey put on 113 for the third wicket, with McDonald making 67. Then Miller joined Harvey and the pair put on 168 for the fourth wicket, the highest partnership for that wicket for Australia against South Africa. Miller made 55 but Harvey went on to 190 in six hours, and there were runs lower down the order from Ring, who made 58. Facing arrears of 270, South Africa lost two wickets for 10 when Lindwall removed openers McGlew and Waite. Endean, with 71, and McLean (65) put on 99 for the fifth wicket and Watkins made 48, but the match finished on the fourth day.

=== 4th Test ===
24–29 January 1953
Scorecard

Australia	v	South Africa
530 (135 overs); AL Hassett 163; HJ Tayfield 4/142 (44 overs)		387 (141.4 overs); KJ Funston 92; WA Johnston 5/110 (49.3 overs)
233/3d (47 overs); RN Harvey 116; PNF Mansell 1/40 (7 overs)		177/6 (72 overs); DJ McGlew 54; WA Johnston 2/67 (24 overs)

Match drawn
Adelaide Oval, Adelaide
Umpires: MJ McInnes and RJJ Wright

- Australia won the toss and elected to bat.
- 25 January was taken as a rest day.
- ERH Fuller (SA) made his Test debut.

McDonald and Lindsay Hassett put on 275 for the second Australian wicket, the highest partnership in Tests between the two countries. McDonald made 154 and Hassett 163. Later Harvey hit 84 and Graeme Hole 59 in fast-scoring innings. South Africa opened with Endean making 56, and Waite (44), Funston (92) and Watkins (76) made middle-order runs with cautious batting. But the follow-on was averted only with the last pair at the wicket. Australia's bowling was handicapped by injury to first Miller and then Lindwall. Australia's second innings was largely compiled in a quick 157-run second wicket partnership between Arthur Morris (77) and Harvey, who made 116. The declaration set South Africa 377 to win in 255 minutes and though wickets fell regularly after an opening stand of 81, the Australian attack, without Miller and Lindwall, was unable to finish the job.

=== 5th Test ===
6–12 February 1953
Scorecard

Australia	v	South Africa
520 (133.4 overs); RN Harvey 205; ERH Fuller 3/74 (19 overs)		435 (143.1 overs); JC Watkins 92; WA Johnston 6/152 (46 overs)
209 (84.2 overs); ID Craig 47; ERH Fuller 5/66 (30.2 overs)		297/4 (95.5 overs); RA McLean 76*; R Benaud 1/41 (15 overs)

South Africa won by 6 wickets
Melbourne Cricket Ground, Melbourne
Umpires: MJ McInnes and RJJ Wright

- Australia won the toss and elected to bat.
- 8 February was taken as a rest day
- The match was scheduled for six days.
- ID Craig and RG Archer (both AUS), and HJ Keith (SA) made their Test debuts.

South Africa's victory enabled them to share a series with Australia for the first time. McDonald (41) and Morris (99) opened with a stand of 122 and then Harvey, with 205, shared century stands with Hassett and Ian Craig, who hit 53 on his Test debut. The innings enabled Harvey to beat Donald Bradman's record of 806 runs in a series against South Africa, set in 1931–32. Harvey's seven runs in the second innings meant he finished the series with 834 runs, still, as of 2009, the fourth highest aggregate for a batsman in a single Test series. South Africa batted determinedly in their first innings with five batsmen passing 50 – Waite (64), Watkins (92), McLean (81), Cheetham (66) and Mansell (52). The Australian attack lacked both Lindwall and Miller, who were injured. Australia's second innings was a stuttering affair, with Fuller effective at the start, when he took the wickets of McDonald and Harvey, and at the end, when he added Benaud, Bill Johnston and Geff Noblet to finish with five for 66. Tayfield's three second innings wickets raised his total for the series to 30, the best for a South African in a series against Australia. Set 295 to win on a worn wicket, South Africa started with Endean making 70 and Watkins 50, and the match was won in a fifth wicket partnership of 106 in 80 minutes between Keith and McLean, who hit an unbeaten 76.

== Assessment ==
Before the series, the relative strengths of the two teams were considered so unequal that there were serious suggestions that it be called off – on the South African side because a crushing defeat would cause long-term damage to the nation's cricket, and on the Australian side because crowds would not be attracted to one-sided matches and the financial results would be disastrous. That the tour was so unexpectedly successful was largely attributed to the management team of Cheetham and Viljoen. The Australian journalist A. G. Moyes wrote:

Few more competent captains than Jack Cheetham have come to Australia, and Ken Viljoen made the perfect manager, the former star cricketer who combined with it a knowledge of men, a determination to efface himself and work entirely for his team, and a happy knack of being with the team and yet retaining proper control. The members of the team would have done anything for Cheetham and Viljoen, and those of us who travelled with them could understand the reasons. The pair worked together in perfect harmony, and this was one of the chief reasons for the success of a tour which had not been wanted by Australian officials, and which seemed certain to fail because there were no draw-cards among the visitors.

== Annual reviews ==
- Playfair Cricket Annual 1953
- Wisden Cricketers' Almanack 1954
