= West Indian cricket team in Australia in 1951–52 =

International cricket tour

	Australia	West Indies
- Dates: 20 October 1951 – 29 January 1952
Captains	Lindsay Hassett; Arthur Morris (3rd Test)	John Goddard; Jeff Stollmeyer (5th Test)

Test series
- Result: Australia won the 5-match series 4–1
Most runs	Lindsay Hassett (402)	Frank Worrell (337)
Most wickets	Bill Johnston (23)	Alf Valentine (24)

The West Indies cricket team toured Australia in the 1951–52 season and played five Test matches against Australia. The series was billed as the "World Championship of cricket", with both teams having beaten England in the previous 18 months. In the event, the series was a disappointment with Australia winning fairly easily by four matches to one.

After the Australian leg of the tour, the West Indies team moved on to New Zealand where the first Test matches between New Zealand and West Indies were played.

== The West Indies touring team ==
The West Indies team was captained by John Goddard, who had led the side to series victories over India and England.

The full side was:

- John Goddard, captain
- Jeff Stollmeyer, vice-captain
- Denis Atkinson
- Robert Christiani
- Wilfred Ferguson
- Gerry Gomez
- Sammy Guillen
- Prior Jones
- Roy Marshall
- Allan Rae
- Sonny Ramadhin
- Ken Rickards
- John Trim
- Alf Valentine
- Clyde Walcott
- Everton Weekes
- Frank Worrell

All of the players except Guillen and Marshall had played Test cricket before the tour, and the two exceptions made their debuts during the Australian leg of the tour.

== The Test matches ==
=== First Test ===
9–13 November 1951
Scorecard

West Indies	v	Australia
216 (70 overs); John Goddard 45; Ray Lindwall 4/62 (20 overs)		226 (64.5 overs); Ray Lindwall 61; Alf Valentine 5/99 (25 overs)
245 (69 overs); Everton Weekes 70; Doug Ring 6/80 (16 overs)		236/7 (85.7 overs); Arthur Morris 48; Sonny Ramadhin 5/90 (40 overs)

Australia won by 3 wickets
The Gabba, Brisbane
Umpires: Andrew Barlow (Aus) and Herb Elphinston (Aus)

- West Indies won the toss and elected to bat.
- Gil Langley (Aus) and Roy Marshall (WI) made their Test debuts.

West Indies batted uneasily against the speed of Ray Lindwall and Keith Miller, with Goddard, coming in at No 9, top-scoring with 45. The Australians were similarly diffident against Ramadhin and Valentine, but Miller and Lindwall, as batsmen, were more aggressive. Valentine took five for 99 and Wisden recorded that five catches were dropped off his bowling in the space of half an hour. Weekes with 70 and Gomez (55) set a target, but Doug Ring's leg-breaks took six for 80. After five overs from the West Indies opening bowlers Gomez and Worrell, Goddard relied entirely on Ramadhin and Valentine, and they bowled more than 80 consecutive overs between them. Innings of more than 40 apiece from Arthur Morris, Neil Harvey and Graeme Hole took Australia to a narrow victory, despite Ramadhin's five for 90.

=== Second Test ===
30 November–5 December 1951
Scorecard

West Indies	v	Australia
362 (107.4 overs); Robert Christiani 76; Ray Lindwall 4/66 (26 overs)		517 (151.5 overs); Lindsay Hassett (132); Alf Valentine 4/111 (30.5 overs)
290 (84.2 overs); John Goddard 57; Keith Miller 3/50 (13.2 overs)		137/3 (34.3 overs); Ken Archer 47; Frank Worrell 2/7 (2 overs)

Australia won by 7 wickets
Sydney Cricket Ground, Sydney
Umpires: Andrew Barlow (Aus) and Herb Elphinston (Aus)

- Australia won the toss and elected to field.
- Jeff Stollmeyer (WI) passed 1,000 runs in Tests.
- Ray Lindwall (Aus) reached 100 wickets in Tests.

West Indies batted consistently, with 50s for Worrell (64), Walcott (60), Christiani (76) and Gomez (54). But after Australia had been reduced to 27 for two wickets, Lindsay Hassett was dropped behind the wicket and he went on to score 132 and to put on 235 with Keith Miller, who made 129. Lindwall and Ring then led the tail to a total of 517. Short-pitched bowling by Lindwall and Miller accounted for several of the West Indies batsmen in the second innings, and despite 50s for Weekes and Goddard the Australians needed only 136 to win.

=== Third Test ===
22–25 December 1951
Scorecard

Australia	v	West Indies
82 (25.7 overs); Graeme Hole 23; Frank Worrell 6/38 (12.7 overs)		105 (24.5 overs); Everton Weekes 26; Bill Johnston 6/62 (12 overs)
255 (74.5 overs); Doug Ring 67; Alf Valentine 6/102 (27.5 overs)		233/4 (73.5 overs); Jeff Stollmeyer 47; Doug Ring 3/62 (16.5 overs)

West Indies won by 6 wickets
Adelaide Oval, Adelaide
Umpires: Mel McInnes (Aus) and Ron Wright (Aus)

- Australia won the toss and elected to bat.
- Sammy Guillen (WI) made his Test debut.
- Frank Worrell (WI) passed 1,000 runs in Tests.
- Bill Johnston (Aus) reached 100 wickets in Tests.

Rain had seeped under the covers and 22 wickets fell on the first day for 207 runs. Worrell took six for 38 in Australia's first innings, and Bill Johnston took six for 62 when bowling unchanged throughout the West Indies innings. Australia's captain Arthur Morris – Hassett was injured – rejigged the batting order for the second innings. Ian Johnson and Geff Noblet were out before the end of the first day, but in easier conditions Ring made 67 and Morris 45, while Valentine took six for 102. West Indies needed 233 to win and at 141 for four seemed to be wobbling, but dropped catches allowed Christiani and Gomez to see them home.

=== Fourth Test ===
31 December–3 January 1951
Scorecard

West Indies	v	Australia
272 (75.3 overs); Frank Worrell 108; Keith Miller 5/60 (19.3 overs)		216 (73.3 overs); Neil Harvey 83; John Trim 5/34 (12 overs)
203 (59.3 overs); Jeff Stollmeyer 54; Bill Johnston 3/51 (14.3 overs)		260/9 (97 overs); Lindsay Hassett 102; Alf Valentine 5/88 (30 overs)

Australia won by 1 wicket
Melbourne Cricket Ground, Melbourne
Umpires: Mel McInnes (Aus) and Ron Wright (Aus)

- West Indies won the toss and elected to bat.
- Gerry Gomez (WI) passed 1,000 runs in Tests.
- John Trim (WI) became the first, and as of 2024 the only player, to be dismissed for a pair in a Test match by being run out in both innings.

An exciting Test began with a century for Worrell, retrieving West Indies from 30 for three with assistance from Gomez and Christiani. Miller took five for 60. Neil Harvey, with 83, and Miller put on 124 for the fourth wicket but the other Australian batsmen failed and Trim took five for 34. West Indies lost wickets regularly, though there were 50s for Stollmeyer and Gomez before a late-order collapse left Australia to get 260. Hassett made 102, but wickets fell to the spin of Ramadhin and Valentine, and at 222 for nine, the match seemed lost. But Ring, with 32, and Johnston made 38 for the last wicket to bring an unlikely victory and win the series.

=== Fifth Test ===
25–29 January 1952
Scorecard

Australia	v	West Indies
116 (36.2 overs); Colin McDonald 32; Gerry Gomez 7/55 (18 overs)		78 (29.6 overs); Sammy Guillen 13*; Keith Miller 5/26 (7.6 overs)
377 (113.2 overs); Keith Miller 69; Frank Worrell 4/95 (23 overs)		213 (67.3 overs); Jeff Stollmeyer 104; Ray Lindwall 5/52 (21 overs)

Australia won by 202 runs
Sydney Cricket Ground. Sydney
Umpires: Herb Elphinston (Aus) and Mel McInnes (Aus)

- Australia won the toss and elected to bat.
- Colin McDonald, George Thoms and Richie Benaud (Aus) made their Test debuts.

First-day humidity helped the swing bowling of Gomez, who took seven for 55, and Worrell (three for 42), but West Indies fared even worse against the bouncers of Lindwall, Johnston and Miller. Australia's dominance was built on painstaking 60s by Colin McDonald, in his first Test match, Hassett, Miller and Graeme Hole, though Gomez completed a ten-wicket haul in the match. Lindwall and Miller kept up a barrage of bouncers against the West Indies and only Stollmeyer, who made 104, lasted long. Lindwall finished with five for 52. Richie Benaud claimed his first Test wicket with the final delivery of the match.

== External sources ==
- Tour home at ESPN Cricinfo
- West Indies in Australia and New Zealand 1951/52 at CricketArchive (subscription required)
