= English cricket team in Australia in 1954–55 =

International cricket tour

Under the auspices of Marylebone Cricket Club (MCC), the England cricket team toured Australia in the 1954–55 season to play a five-match Test series against Australia. England won the series 3–1, with one match drawn, and thereby retained The Ashes, which they had won in 1953. The England squad moved on to New Zealand, where they won both the Tests that were played there. Including the New Zealand leg of the tour, the team played 21 first-class matches (including the Tests), of which they won 12, lost 2, and drew 7. In the seven Test matches, the team was known as England, and in the other 14 as MCC.

== England squad ==
MCC initially selected a 17-man squad captained by Len Hutton, who became the first professional to captain the England team since Arthur Shrewsbury in 1887. Before the team left England, Denis Compton suffered a recurrence of a troublesome knee injury, and needed treatment. Vic Wilson was added to squad as Compton's replacement. However, Compton's injury responded well to treatment, and he was able to join the team later, so England completed the tour with 18 players.

Also travelling with the party were Lancashire club secretary Geoffrey Howard, who was the tour manager; George Duckworth the former Lancashire and England wicket-keeper, who was the team's scorer and baggage master; and physiotherapist Harold Dalton of Essex.

Squad details below state each player's age at the beginning of the tour (on 11 October 1954), his batting hand, his type of bowling, and his County Championship club at the time:

Batsmen
Name	County club	Birth date	Batting style	Bowling style	Ref
L. Hutton (captain)	Yorkshire	23 June 1916 (aged 38)	right-handed	leg break	
P. B. H. May (vice-captain)	Surrey	31 December 1929 (aged 24)	right-handed		
D. C. S. Compton	Middlesex	23 May 1918 (aged 36)	right-handed	slow left-arm wrist spin	
M. C. Cowdrey	Kent	24 December 1932 (aged 21)	right-handed	leg break	
W. J. Edrich	Middlesex	26 March 1916 (aged 38)	right-handed	right arm fast-medium and off break	
T. W. Graveney	Gloucestershire	16 June 1927 (aged 27)	right-handed	leg break	
R. T. Simpson	Nottinghamshire	27 February 1920 (aged 34)	right-handed	off break	
J. V. Wilson	Yorkshire	17 January 1921 (aged 33)	left-handed	right arm medium	

All-rounders
Name	County club	Birth date	Batting style	Bowling style	Ref
T. E. Bailey	Essex	3 December 1923 (aged 30)	right-handed	right arm fast-medium	

Wicket-keepers
Name	County club	Birth date	Batting style	Bowling style	Ref
K. V. Andrew	Northamptonshire	15 December 1929 (aged 24)	right-handed		
T. G. Evans	Kent	18 August 1920 (aged 34)	right-handed		

Bowlers
Name	County club	Birth date	Batting style	Bowling style	Ref
R. Appleyard	Yorkshire	27 June 1924 (aged 30)	right-handed	right arm medium and off break	
A. V. Bedser	Surrey	4 July 1918 (aged 36)	right-handed	right arm fast-medium	
P. J. Loader	Surrey	25 October 1929 (aged 24)	right-handed	right arm fast	
J. E. McConnon	Glamorgan	21 June 1922 (aged 32)	right-handed	off break	
J. B. Statham	Lancashire	17 June 1930 (aged 24)	right-handed	right arm fast	
F. H. Tyson	Northamptonshire	6 June 1930 (aged 24)	right-handed	right arm fast	
J. H. Wardle	Yorkshire	8 January 1923 (aged 31)	left-handed	slow left-arm wrist and orthodox spin	

== Australia selections ==
Australia, captained by Ian Johnson, used 17 players in the series.

The details for each player below state his age at the beginning of the English tour (on 11 October 1954), his batting hand, his type of bowling, and his Sheffield Shield state at the time:

Batsmen
Name	Shield state	Birth date	Batting style	Bowling style	Ref
P. J. P. Burge	Queensland	17 May 1932 (aged 22)	right-handed	right arm medium	
J. W. Burke	New South Wales	12 June 1930 (aged 24)	right-handed	off break	
L. E. Favell	South Australia	6 October 1929 (aged 25)	right-handed	right arm medium	
R. N. Harvey	Victoria	8 October 1928 (aged 26)	left-handed	right arm off break	
G. B. Hole	South Australia	6 January 1931 (aged 23)	right-handed	off break	
C. C. McDonald	Victoria	17 November 1928 (aged 25)	right-handed		
A. R. Morris	New South Wales	19 January 1922 (aged 32)	left-handed	slow left-arm wrist spin	
W. J. Watson	New South Wales	31 January 1931 (aged 23)	right-handed		

All-rounders
Name	Shield state	Birth date	Batting style	Bowling style	Ref
R. Benaud	New South Wales	6 October 1930 (aged 24)	right-handed	leg break and googly	
A. K. Davidson	New South Wales	14 June 1929 (aged 25)	left-handed	left arm fast medium	
K. R. Miller	New South Wales	28 November 1919 (aged 34)	right-handed	right arm fast	

Wicket-keepers
Name	Shield state	Birth date	Batting style	Bowling style	Ref
G. R. A. Langley	South Australia	14 September 1919 (aged 35)	right-handed		
L. V. Maddocks	Victoria	26 May 1924 (aged 30)	right-handed		

Bowlers
Name	Shield state	Birth date	Batting style	Bowling style	Ref
I. W. G. Johnson (captain)	Victoria	8 December 1917 (aged 36)	right-handed	off break	
R. G. Archer	Queensland	25 October 1933 (aged 20)	right-handed	right arm fast	
W. A. Johnston	Victoria	26 February 1922 (aged 32)	left-handed	slow left arm orthodox and left arm medium	
R. R. Lindwall	Queensland	3 October 1921 (aged 33)	right-handed	right arm fast	

== Tour itinerary ==
The following is a list of the 23 matches played by MCC/England in Australia. Seventeen, including the five Test matches, were first-class fixtures.
The Test matches are in bold font. The six minor games are in the rows with a cotton cream background.

**Dates**	**Match**	**Venue**	**Result**	Notes
11–12 Oct 1954	Western Australia Country v MCC	Recreation Reserve, Bunbury	Match drawn	Two-day match. Edrich scored 129; McConnon took 5/30.
15–19 Oct 1954	Western Australia v MCC	WACA Ground, Perth	MCC won by 7 wickets	Opening first-class match. WA 103 (Statham 6/23) & 255 (Ken Meuleman 109; Statham 3/68). MCC 321 (Hutton 145*) (Note: Hutton retired hurt when the team score was 250/3; he took no further part in the match.) & 40/3.
22–25 Oct 1954	Western Australia Combined XI v MCC	WACA Ground, Perth	MCC won by an innings and 62 runs	WAC 86 (Statham 3/21) and 163 (Wardle 4/34). MCC 311 (May 129, Wilson 72).
29 Oct – 2 Nov 1954	South Australia v MCC	Adelaide Oval	MCC won by 21 runs	MCC 246 (Compton 113) and 181 (Hutton 98). SA 254 (Favell 84; Tyson 5/62) and 152 (Favell 47; Appleyard 5/46).
5–9 Nov 1954	Australian XI v MCC	Melbourne Cricket Ground	Match drawn	MCC 205 (Simpson 74; Johnson 6/66). Aus XI 167/7. No play on the last two days.
12–16 Nov 1954	New South Wales v MCC	Sydney Cricket Ground	Match drawn	MCC 252 (Cowdrey 110, Hutton 102) and 327 (Cowdrey 103). NSW 382 (Bill Watson 155; Tyson 4/98, Bedser 4/117) and 78/2.
19–23 Nov 1954	Queensland v MCC	The Gabba, Brisbane	Match drawn	MCC 304 (Simpson 136, Compton 110; Lindwall 4/66) and 288 (May 77). QLD 288 and 25/2.
**26 Nov – 1 Dec 1954**	**Australia v England**	**The Gabba, Brisbane**	**Australia won by an innings and 154 runs**	**First Test**.
	Queensland Country v MCC	Association Ground, Rockhampton		
	Australia Prime Minister's XI v MCC	Manuka Oval, Canberra		
	Victoria v MCC	Melbourne Cricket Ground		
**17-22 Dec 1954**	**Australia v England**	**Sydney Cricket Ground**	**England won by 38 runs**	**Second Test**.
	Northern New South Wales v MCC	No. 1 Sports Ground, Newcastle, New South Wales		
**31 Dec 1954 – 5 Jan 1955**	**Australia v England**	**Melbourne Cricket Ground**	**England won by 128 runs**	**Third Test**.
	Tasmania Combined XI v MCC	Tasmania Cricket Association Ground, Hobart		
	Tasmania v MCC	North Tasmania Cricket Association Ground, Launceston		
	South Australia Country v MCC	Vansittart Park, Mount Gambier		
	South Australia v MCC	Adelaide Oval		
**28 Jan – 2 Feb 1955**	**Australia v England**	**Adelaide Oval**	**England won by 5 wickets**	**Fourth Test**.
	Victoria Country v MCC	Yallourn Oval, Yallourn		
	Victoria v MCC	Melbourne Cricket Ground		
	New South Wales v MCC	Sydney Cricket Ground		
**25 Feb – 3 Mar 1955**	**Australia v England**	**Sydney Cricket Ground**	**Match drawn**	**Fifth Test**.

== Test series summary ==
- 1st Test at Brisbane Cricket Ground – Australia won by an innings and 154 runs
- 2nd Test at Sydney Cricket Ground – England won by 38 runs
- 3rd Test at Melbourne Cricket Ground – England won by 128 runs
- 4th Test at Adelaide Oval – England won by 5 wickets
- 5th Test at Sydney Cricket Ground – match drawn

=== First Test ===
26 November–1 December 1954 (6-day match)
scorecard

Australia	v	England
8/601d (129 overs); RN Harvey 162; TE Bailey 3/140		190 (76.1 overs); TV Bailey 88; RR Lindwall 3/27
		257 (90.1 overs) (f/o); WJ Edrich 88; R Benaud 3/43

Australia won by an innings and 154 runs
The Gabba, Brisbane
Umpires: Col Hoy (AUS) & Mel McInnes (AUS)

- England won the toss and elected to field
- 28 November was taken as a rest day
- LE Favell (Aus), KV Andrew (Eng) and MC Cowdrey (Eng) made their test debuts.

=== Second Test ===
17–22 December 1954 (6-day match)
scorecard

England	v	Australia
154 (54.3 overs); J Wardle 35 (62); RG Archer 3/12 (12 overs)		228 (55.4 overs); RG Archer 49 (89); FH Tyson 4/45 (13 overs)
296 (104.3 overs); PBH May 104 (280); RG Archer 3/53 (22 overs)		184 (53.4 overs); RN Harvey 92 (191); FH Tyson 6/85 (18.4 overs)

England won by 38 runs
Sydney Cricket Ground, Sydney
Umpires: Mel McInnes (Aus) and Ron Wright (Aus)

- Australia won the toss and elected to field
- 19 December was taken as a rest day

=== Third Test ===
31 December 1954–5 January 1955 (6-day match)
scorecard

England	v	Australia
191 (67.6 overs); MC Cowdrey 102; RG Archer 4/33 (13.6 overs)		231 (63.3 overs); LV Maddocks 47; JB Statham 5/60 (16.3 overs)
279 (100.5 overs); PBH May 91; WA Johnston 5/85 (24.5 overs)		111 (31.3 overs); LE Favell 30; FH Tyson 7/27 (12.3 overs)

England won by 128 runs
Melbourne Cricket Ground, Melbourne
Umpires: Col Hoy (Aus) and Mel McInnes (Aus)

- England won the toss and elected to bat
- 2 January was taken as a rest day

=== Fourth Test ===
28 January–2 February 1955 (6-day match)
scorecard

Australia	v	England
323 (99.1 overs); LV Maddocks 69; TE Bailey 3/39 (12 overs)		341 (140.6 overs); L Hutton 80; R Benaud 4/120 (36.6 overs)
111 (43.2 overs); CC McDonald 29; R Appleyard 3/13 (12 overs)		5/97 (30.4 overs); PBH May 26; KR Miller 3/40 (10.4 overs)

England won by 5 wickets
Adelaide Oval, Adelaide
Umpires: Mel McInnes (Aus) and Ron Wright (Aus)

- Australia won the toss and elected to bat
- 30 January was taken as a rest day

=== Fifth Test ===
25 February–3 March 1955 (6-day match)
scorecard

England	v	Australia
7/371d (99.1 overs); TW Graveney 111 (157); IWG Johnson 3/68 (20 overs)		221 (60.4 overs); CC McDonald 72 (149); J Wardle 5/79 (24.4 overs)
		6/118 (28.6 overs) (f/o); CC McDonald 37 (69); J Wardle 3/51 (12 overs)

Match drawn
Sydney Cricket Ground, Sydney
Umpires: Mel McInnes (Aus) and Ron Wright (Aus)

- Australia won the toss and elected to field
- 27 February was taken as a rest day
- PJP Burge (Aus) and WJ Watson (Aus) made their test debuts

== Ceylon stopover ==
The MCC party had a stopover in Colombo en route to Australia. On 30 September 1954, they played a one-day single innings match (i.e., not limited overs) at the Colombo Oval against the Ceylon national team. MCC's team, captained by May, was mainly composed of the younger and less experienced players. Ceylon won the toss, and decided to field. MCC scored 178/8 declared (Cowdrey 66*), and Ceylon had reached 101/4 at close of play, so the result was a draw.

== Bibliography ==
- Harte, Chris (1993). A History of Australian Cricket. London: André Deutsch. ISBN 978-02-33988-25-2.
- Playfair (1955). Ross, Gordon (ed.). Playfair Cricket Annual. London: Playfair Books Ltd. OCLC 504053952.
- Robinson, Ray (1975). On Top Down Under. Australia: Cassell. ISBN 978-07-26973-64-2.
- Wisden (1956). Preston, Norman (ed.). Wisden Cricketers' Almanack (93rd ed.). London: Sporting Handbooks Ltd. OCLC 867874277.
