= South African cricket team in England in 1955 =

International cricket tour

The South African cricket team toured England in the 1955 season to play a five-match Test series against England. England won the series 3–2 with no matches drawn.

== South African team ==
The South African team was captained by Jack Cheetham, with Jackie McGlew as vice-captain. Ken Viljoen, the former Test cricketer, was the manager. The combination of Cheetham and Viljoen had led South Africa to its most successful tour of Australia ever, the 1952-53 tour, when the team drew the series with Australia. Arguably the team's performance in England was even better, since the hosts were recognised at the time as the strongest team in Test cricket, having beaten Australia both home and away and drawn with West Indies away during the previous two years.

Jack Cheetham's team was noted for the excellence of its fielding. Writing some sixteen years later, Richard Whitington praised the fielders in the 1970–71 Australia v England series as "beginning to resemble Jack Cheetham's unforgettable Springboks". Commenting on the 1974–75 Ashes series, Frank Tyson said he had not seen a better fielding display since the 1955 Springboks".

The full team was:

- Jack Cheetham, captain
- Jackie McGlew, vice-captain
- Neil Adcock
- Chris Duckworth, wicketkeeper
- Russell Endean
- Eddie Fuller
- Trevor Goddard
- Peter Heine
- Headley Keith
- Percy Mansell
- Roy McLean
- Anton Murray
- Ian Smith
- Hugh Tayfield
- John Waite, wicketkeeper
- Paul Winslow

Cheetham, McGlew, Endean, Mansell, McLean, Tayfield and Waite had toured England with the 1951 team. Smith had toured England with the 1947 team, but had not been selected in 1951; he was the only remaining player who had been to England on that tour. McGlew, Adcock, Duckworth, Goddard, McLean, Tayfield and Waite would return to England with the 1960 team. Before this tour in 1955, only Duckworth, Goddard and Heine had not played Test cricket, and Goddard and Heine made their Test debuts during the 1955 series. Duckworth, who subsequently played two Tests in 1957, and Murray, who had played 10 Tests before this tour, were the only players not selected for a Test on this tour.

== Test series summary ==
=== First Test ===
9–13 June 1955
(5-day match)
Scorecard

England	v	South Africa
334 (168.4 overs); D Kenyon 87; ERH Fuller 3/59 (29 overs)		181 (114 overs); DJ McGlew 68; JH Wardle 4/24 (32 overs)
		148 (f/o) (96.3 overs); DJ McGlew 51; FH Tyson 6/28 (21.3 overs)

England won by an innings and 5 runs
Trent Bridge, Nottingham
Umpires: TJ Bartley and FS Lee

- England won the toss and elected to bat.
- 12 June was taken as a rest day.
- The match was scheduled for five days but completed in four.
- KF Barrington (ENG) and TL Goddard (SA) made their Test debuts.

With Leonard Hutton unable to play because of lumbago, Peter May captained England for the first time. A new opening pair of Don Kenyon and Tom Graveney started with 91 and Kenyon went on to make 87. May made 83, but Ken Barrington on his Test debut, lasted only three balls. England's innings took nine hours, but South Africa's batting was even slower. After five wickets had fallen for 55 runs, McGlew, whose 68 took 305 minutes, and Cheetham (54) put on 94 in three hours. But Johnny Wardle finished the innings with four wickets for 24 runs in 32 overs. May enforced the follow-on, but McGlew (51) and Goddard (32) survived to the end of the third day and beyond a delayed start on the Monday. Then with fast bowlers unable to bowl from one end because of dampness, Frank Tyson and Trevor Bailey took eight out the 10 wickets from the other, Tyson finishing with figures of six for 28.

=== Second Test ===
23–27 June 1955
(5-day match)
Scorecard

England	v	South Africa
133 (54.2 overs); KF Barrington 34; PS Heine 5/60 (25 overs)		304 (102 overs); RA McLean 142; JH Wardle 4/65 (29 overs)
353 (149.5 overs); PBH May 112; HJ Tayfield 5/80 (38.5 overs)		111 (57.4 overs); WR Endean 28; JB Statham 7/39 (29 overs)

England won by 71 runs
Lord's, London
Umpires: F Chester and LH Gray

- England won the toss and elected to bat.
- 26 June was taken as a rest day.
- The match was scheduled for five days but completed in four.
- FJ Titmus (ENG) and PS Heine (SA) made their Test debuts.

A fast pitch produced a match that was exciting throughout. England won the toss and batted, but Heine, on his Test debut, made the ball lift awkwardly and took five wickets for 60 runs. Goddard supported well with 4/59. McGlew and Goddard both went for ducks, but after tea on the first day the pitch lost its spitefulness. Endean started the recovery with 48, and then McLean hit 142 out of 196 in just over three-and-a-half hours. Keith, batting more sedately, added 109 for the sixth wicket with McLean and went on to 57 himself. Facing a deficit of 171, England lost Kenyon quickly, Graveney (60) added 132 with May, who then added a further 96 with Denis Compton (69). May made 112 before he trod on his wicket. Tayfield was South Africa's most successful bowler with five for 80. Brian Statham removed both openers before the end of the third day, and a ball bowled by Fred Trueman hit Cheetham on the elbow and chipped a bone, so he retired hurt. On the Monday, aided by a two-hour break for bad light, Statham bowled throughout the innings, taking the first seven wickets to fall and finishing with seven for 39.

=== Third Test ===
7–12 July 1955
(5-day match)
Scorecard

England	v	South Africa
284 (126 overs); DCS Compton 158; NAT Adcock 3/52 (28 overs); TL Goddard 3/52 (27 overs)		521/8d (195 overs); JHB Waite 113; FH Tyson 3/124 (44 overs)
381 (173.5 overs); PBH May 117; PS Heine 5/86 (32 overs)		145/7 (30.3 overs); RA McLean 50; FH Tyson 3/55 (13.3 overs)

South Africa won by 3 wickets
Old Trafford, Manchester
Umpires: D Davies and FS Lee

- England won the toss and elected to bat.
- 10 July was taken as a rest day.

With Cheetham injured McGlew assumed the captaincy and effected England's first defeat at Old Trafford since 1902, this achieved with three minutes to spare. Another lively pitch brought a decent scoring rate and several injuries: Godfrey Evans broke a finger and Graveney kept wicket in South Africa's second innings. England's first innings owed almost everything to Compton, who having forgotten his kitbag, sauntered into the Museum and borrowed an antique bat off the display, made 158 and shared a fifth wicket stand of 144 with Trevor Bailey, who made 44. McGlew and Goddard (62) shared an opening partnership of 147, but after Goddard was out, McGlew became another finger injury casualty and four further wickets fell cheaply. Waite and Winslow then came together and shared a sixth wicket partnership of 171. Both made centuries: Waite 113 and Winslow 108. When McGlew resumed his innings at the fall of the seventh wicket, he became the third century-maker with an unbeaten 104. England lost openers Kenyon and Graveney for just a run apiece. Then May, with 117, shared century stands with Compton (71) and Colin Cowdrey (50). The injured Evans made 36 of a last-wicket partnership of 48 with Bailey, but South Africa needed 145 to win in 135 minutes. McGlew and McLean hit 72 in 50 minutes, and though wickets fell regularly after that, the target was achieved in what would have been the penultimate over.

=== Fourth Test ===
21–26 July 1955
(5-day match)
Scorecard

South Africa	v	England
171 (70.2 overs); RA McLean 41; WR Endean 41; PJ Loader 4/52 (19 overs)		191 (89.5 overs); DCS Compton 61; PS Heine 4/70 (29.5 overs); HJ Tayfield 4/70 (31 overs)
500 (208.5 overs); DJ McGlew 133; JH Wardle 4/100 (57 overs)		256 (142.1 overs); PBH May 97; TL Goddard 5/69 (62 overs)

South Africa won by 224 runs
Headingley, Leeds
Umpires: TJ Bartley and F Chester

- South Africa won the toss and elected to bat.
- 24 July was taken as a rest day.

South Africa lost half their first innings wickets for 38 and were then 98 for seven. Innings of 41 apiece by McLean and Endean gave the total some respectability; Peter Loader took four wickets for 52 runs. England's new opening pair of Trevor Bailey and Frank Lowson failed, and only May with 47 and Compton (61) made runs against an attack depleted by injury to Adcock. Just 20 behind on the first innings, South Africa's openers, McGlew and Goddard, opened with a careful stand of 176, the highest first-wicket partnership against England to this point. Goddard went for 74, but McGlew completed a century, falling eventually for 133. Keith made 73, and after a mid-innings collapse Endean, with 116, shepherded the lower order batsmen to a total of 500. Graveney opened with Lowson as England sought 481 in eight hours and 20 minutes, but Lowson was out without scoring. Graveney made 36 and then May (97) and Doug Insole (47) put on 101 for the third wicket. The rest of the batting was worn down by Goddard and Tayfield, both of whom finished with five wickets in the innings. Goddard bowled 62 overs in all, bowling continuously on the last day from 11.30 in the morning until victory at 4.12 in the afternoon.

=== Fifth Test ===
13–17 August 1955
(5-day match)
Scorecard

England	v	South Africa
151 (89.4 overs); DB Close 32; TL Goddard 5/31 (22.4 overs)		112 (65 overs); DJ McGlew 30; GAR Lock 4/39 (22 overs)
204 (123.4 overs); PBH May 89*; HJ Tayfield 5/60 (53.4 overs)		151 (87.4 overs); JHB Waite 60; JC Laker 5/56 (37.4 overs)

England won by 92 runs
The Oval, London
Umpires: TJ Bartley and D Davies

- England won the toss and elected to bat.
- 14 August was taken as a rest day.
- The match was scheduled for five days but completed in four.

Prior to the start of the game there was a lengthy South African Selection Committee debate as to who should captain the team, Cheetham opting for McGlew following his victories in the Third and Fourth encounters, McGlew disagreeing and so it was that Cheetham led the team out onto the Oval that Saturday in humid conditions, conditions which initially assisted the South African seam bowlers Heine and Fuller, however they bowled too long, the Englishmen masterful in reaping the error. Rain set in from early afternoon and the pitch when play resumed on the Monday was soft. Goddard's left-arm bowling brought him five wickets for 31, but when South Africa batted, it was the spin bowlers Tony Lock and Jim Laker who caused most damage, and only McGlew (30) and Waite (28) resisted for long. England's second innings was built around a defiant unbeaten 89 by May who shared useful partnerships with Compton and Graveney. Tayfield bowled 52 consecutive overs and took five for 60. South Africa needed 244 to win, and the match was effectively lost in the course of three overs from Lock and Laker in which the opening partnership between McGlew and Goddard was broken, and then the next three batsmen, Keith, Endean and McLean, failed to score. Waite made 60 as the other batsmen disappointed. Lock finished with four for 62, with Laker taking five for 56, and the match was over on the fourth day.
