= Anton Murray =

South African cricketer (1922–1995)

Personal information
- Full name: Anton Ronald Andrew Murray
- Born: 30 April 1922; Grahamstown, Cape Province, South Africa
- Died: 17 April 1995 (aged 72); Cape Town, South Africa
- Height: 6 ft 2 in (188 cm)
- Batting: Right-handed
- Bowling: Right-arm slow-medium
- Role: All-rounder

International information
- National side: South Africa
- Test debut (cap 186): 5 December 1952 v Australia
- Last Test: 9 February 1954 v New Zealand

Domestic team information
- Years: Team
- 1947/48–1955/56: Eastern Province

Career statistics
| Competition | Test | First-class |
|---|---|---|
| Matches | 10 | 64 |
| Runs scored | 289 | 2,685 |
| Batting average | 22.23 | 29.83 |
| 100s/50s | 1/1 | 4/15 |
| Top score | 109 | 133 |
| Balls bowled | 2,374 | 14,807 |
| Wickets | 18 | 188 |
| Bowling average | 39.44 | 24.90 |
| 5 wickets in innings | 0 | 8 |
| 10 wickets in match | 0 | 2 |
| Best bowling | 4/169 | 7/30 |
| Catches/stumpings | 3/– | 32/– |
- Source: CricketArchive, 17 April 2009

Anton Ronald Andrew Murray (30 April 1922 – 17 April 1995) was a South African cricketer.

He played in 10 Test matches in just over a year from December 1952 to February 1954, appearing four times against Australia and then six times against New Zealand. He later toured England as a member of the 1955 South African side, but did not appear in any of the Tests there. Outside of cricket, he was a schoolmaster who founded a noted school in Pretoria.

== Cricket career ==
Anton Murray was a tall and athletic cricketer: a useful middle or lower order right-handed batsman and a right-arm slow-to-medium-pace bowler who used a lot of variations of pace. He played South African domestic first-class cricket from the 1947–48 season, and had a sensational first season for Eastern Province, scoring 133, which proved to be his highest first-class score, in only his second match, the game against Western Province at Cape Town. Later in the same season, he took seven wickets for 30 runs, his best single-innings haul, in the match against Orange Free State at Bloemfontein.

The suspension of the Currie Cup competition over the next two seasons while first England and then Australia toured South Africa limited Murray's first-class cricket to just two matches in the first season. In 1950–51, when the domestic competition resumed, Murray had an unspectacular batting season and, except in one innings, a modest bowling season too: the exception was the match against Transvaal, when he took seven for 109, the second seven-wicket haul of his career. These were seven of only eight Transvaal wickets that fell to bowlers in the match, which Eastern Province lost by 10 wickets.

There were more runs and more wickets in the 1951–52 season, but no more centuries or five-wicket innings hauls. But at the end of the South African domestic season he was selected for the match between J. E. Cheetham's XI and D. J. McGlew's XI which was used by the South African Test selectors to pick the team to tour Australia and New Zealand the following winter. The first two days of the match were lost to rain, but Murray then took four wickets for 36 runs, the best bowling figures of the match, to win a place on the tour.

== Test cricketer ==
The 1952–53 South African cricket tour to Australia and New Zealand surpassed previous South African Test efforts, with the series against the Australians drawn – all previous series had been lost – and that against New Zealand won. If the outstanding player for South Africa was the spin bowler Hugh Tayfield, then many of the others, Murray included, contributed runs, high-class fielding and occasional wickets.

Murray made his Test debut in the first Test of the tour, and such were the numbers of all-rounders played by South Africa that he batted at No 9, making 18 and an unbeaten 11. In the one match of the series where Australian spin, in the person of Doug Ring, more than matched South African, Murray failed to take a wicket.

Packing the side with batsmen paid off for the South Africans in the second Test: Murray, again batting at No 9, joined Percy Mansell with the score at 126 for seven wickets, and proceeded to make 51, the highest score in the innings. Fibrositis limited his bowling in the first Australian innings to just three overs. In the second innings, he made 23, and he then took the wicket of Colin McDonald in Australia's second innings before Tayfield polished off the match by taking seven wickets to finish with 13 wickets in the match.

The Third Test proved to be the South Africans' least successful of the entire tour. Ray Lindwall and Keith Miller were the main reasons for a first innings total of just 177, to which Murray, promoted to bat at No 7, contributed just 4. When the Australians batted, Neil Harvey made 190 and Tayfield broke his left thumb which, though not his bowling hand, restricted his effectiveness. In the event, Murray proved the South Africans' leading wicket taker, but his four wickets, including Harvey, cost him 169 runs in 51.2 eight-ball overs. The figures nevertheless remained the best of his Test career. Batting again, the South Africans totalled 232 to lose by an innings, and Murray made 17.

Murray missed the next three weeks of cricket, including the fourth Test match, but resumed his place in the side for fifth Test, which South Africa won to square the series. His own contribution was limited: one wicket and 17 runs in his single innings.

The tour then moved on to New Zealand, where there were two first-class matches before the two Test matches. Murray did not play in the first game, but in the second, batting at No 10, he came to the wicket with the South Africans at 155 for eight, 190 behind Canterbury's score. He then shared a partnership of 121 with Cheetham, who made 64, and an unbroken tenth wicket partnership of 80 with Michael Melle. The innings was declared with Murray exactly 100 not out.

The first Test against a weak New Zealand side was dominated by a score of 255 not out by McGlew, the highest individual score for South Africa in Tests to that date. Murray, batting at No 8, joined McGlew with the score at 238 for six and proceeded to hit 109, his first and only Test century, sharing a partnership of 246 which doubled the previous record for the seventh wicket for South Africa in Tests. It was, at the time, the highest seventh wicket partnership in all Test cricket and remains, as of 2009, the fourth highest in all Tests. Murray also proved useful with the ball in this Test, taking three for 30 and two for 19 in a total of 51 overs, as New Zealand lost by an innings.

The second Test of the series on a very slow pitch at Auckland, was an anticlimax: Murray made six and took one wicket for 29 runs off 31 overs.

In the 1953–54 South African domestic season, New Zealand toured for a full series of five Test matches, and the domestic Currie Cup competition was suspended for the season. Murray played in four of the five Tests, missing the fourth Test, but was not at all successful: in five innings, he scored just 33 runs with a highest of 13 when he was promoted to open the innings in the second Test following an injury to regular opener John Waite. With the emergence of Neil Adcock as a fast bowler, South Africa relied less on spin, and Murray took only six wickets in the series. The series proved to be the end of his Test career.

== Later cricket career ==
The Currie Cup competition resumed in 1954–55, and Murray had one of his best seasons, averaging 42 with the bat and taking 37 wickets in just six first-class matches at an average of only 15.10 runs per wicket. It earned him selection for the 1955 South African team to tour England.

In a warm English summer with hard wickets, Murray's slow to medium paced bowling was economical in the county matches, but not penetrative enough to take many wickets. He finished second in the bowling averages on the tour as a whole, with 31 wickets, but his batting also disappointed, with an average of just 16, and he was one of only two players – the other was the reserve wicketkeeper, Christopher Duckworth – who did not play in any of the Test matches. He was not helped by an injury to his thumb which kept him out of first-class matches for most of July: on his return to the side, he hit exactly 100, opening the innings against the Minor Counties cricket team, but the match was not first-class. His b est score in a first-class match was 51 against Gloucestershire, when he also opened the innings. At other times on the tour, however, he batted as low as No 10.

Back in South Africa in the 1955–56 season, Murray made just three further appearances for Eastern Province in the Currie Cup, making 241 runs at an average of 40 and taking nine wickets. He retired from first-class cricket at the end of the season.

== Outside cricket ==
Murray was a schoolmaster. In 1963, he was the founding headmaster of St. Alban's College, a progressive boarding school in Pretoria, and he remained as head there until he retired in 1982.
