= Eddie Fuller =

South African cricketer (1931–2008)

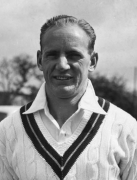

Personal information
- Full name: Edward Russell Henry Fuller
- Born: 2 August 1931; Worcester, Western Cape, South Africa
- Died: 19 July 2008 (aged 76); Milnerton, Cape Town, South Africa
- Batting: Right-handed
- Bowling: Right-arm fast-medium
- Role: Bowler

International information
- National side: South Africa
- Test debut (cap 187): 24 January 1953 v Australia
- Last Test: 3 January 1958 v Australia

Domestic team information
- Years: Team
- 1950/51–1957/58: Western Province
- 1965: Cumberland

Career statistics
Competition	Test	First-class
Matches	7	59
Runs scored	64	1,062
Batting average	8.00	15.17
100s/50s	0/0	0/4
Top score	17	69
Balls bowled	1898	13,803
Wickets	22	190
Bowling average	30.36	26.45
5 wickets in innings	1	11
10 wickets in match	0	3
Best bowling	5/66	7/40
Catches/stumpings	3/–	29/–
- Source: CricketArchive, 5 April 2009

Edward Russell Henry Fuller (2 August 1931 – 19 July 2008) was a South African cricketer who played in seven Test matches between 1953 and 1957. He was born in Worcester, Western Cape and died in Milnerton, Cape Town.

Fuller was a right-handed lower-order batsman who made useful runs in domestic South African cricket and a bowler of right-arm medium-fast cutters. In Test cricket, he was primarily used as a bowler and his Test highest score was only 17.

== First-class cricket ==
Eddie Fuller attended Observatory Boys' High School in Cape Town before becoming an accountant. He made his first-class debut for Western Province in two matches in the 1950–51 season, but came to prominence at the start of the 1951–52 season by taking 10 wickets in just his third first-class match: he took three Transvaal wickets for 47 runs in the first innings and followed that with seven for 54 in the second to finish with match figures of 10 for 101. With a further five-wicket haul a month later against Natal, Fuller was picked, after just nine first-class games, for the South African tour of Australia and New Zealand in 1952–53.

== Test player ==
Fuller played for the South Africans in several of the warm-up matches and in first-class games between the first three Tests, but was not called into the Test side until the fourth match of the five-game series against Australia. He had a quick success, taking the wicket of opening batsman Arthur Morris with the score at just 2, but then was one of four bowlers who conceded more than 100 runs each as the Australians totalled 530. He was also in the last-wicket partnership that enabled South Africa to avoid the follow-on, though all the runs were made by his partner Michael Melle. The match was drawn.

Retaining his place for the fifth and final Test, Fuller was the most successful South African bowler in the match, which enabled his team to win and to square the series, the first time South Africa had not been beaten in a Test series against Australia. His three wickets in the first innings included Australian top-scorer Neil Harvey, and Harvey was among five victims for Fuller in the second innings at a cost of 66 runs, the best innings figures of his Test career.

There were four further wickets for Fuller in the two-match series against New Zealand that followed the Australian leg of the tour: in the second match at Auckland, he also scored 17, batting at No 11: these were his first Test runs and remained his highest Test score.

In the 1953–54 South African season, the Currie Cup domestic competition was suspended because of a tour by the New Zealand cricket team. Fuller played in only three first-class matches all season, taking just five wickets, and Neil Adcock emerged as the new spearhead of the South African Test attack. The following year, he returned to form and favour with 19 Currie Cup wickets, and was picked for the 1955 team to tour England.

In England, Adcock was regarded initially as the leading South African opening bowler, but his lack of control in the Tests meant that he was eventually dropped. In contrast, Peter Heine emerged as a genuine fast bowler, and was played in the four final Tests of a five-Test series. Fuller benefited from Heine's omission from the first Test and Adcock's omission from the fifth, but did not play in the middle three Tests of the series. In the first match, which was won easily by England, Fuller took three for 59. Recalled in place of Adcock for the last Test, he took three more wickets in a low-scoring match that decided the series in England's favour. On the tour as a whole, Fuller took 49 first-class wickets at the average of 19.51 each.

The 1955–56 season was Fuller's most successful in South African domestic cricket, with 23 wickets in five Currie Cup matches, including his career-best innings figures of seven for 40 for Western Province against Transvaal. The following season, with an England tour of South Africa, he took five wickets in an innings in two separate matches against the touring team for Western Province, but was not picked for any of the five Tests.

== League cricket ==
In 1957, Fuller went to England to play as a professional in the Lancashire League for Ramsbottom. He took seven wickets for 11 runs in the Lancashire League Worsley Cup Final of 1957 as Ramsbottom dismissed Rawtenstall for just 36 to win the cup easily.

He returned to South Africa for the 1957–58 season and was drafted into the Test side for his seventh, and final, Test match, the second of the 1957–58 series against Australia, because of injury to Heine. In a heavy defeat, he took only two wickets and he was the first victim in a hat-trick by Lindsay Kline which finished the match. The match between Western Province and the Australians towards the end of the tour was Fuller's final appearance in first-class cricket in South Africa.

Fuller went back to Ramsbottom as professional in 1958, and made a single further first-class appearance at the end of the 1958 English cricket season as a member of a Commonwealth XI against an England XI in the festival at Torquay. In 1959, he switched to Rawtenstall for a final season of Lancashire League cricket.
