= Eric Norton =

South African cricketer and school headmaster

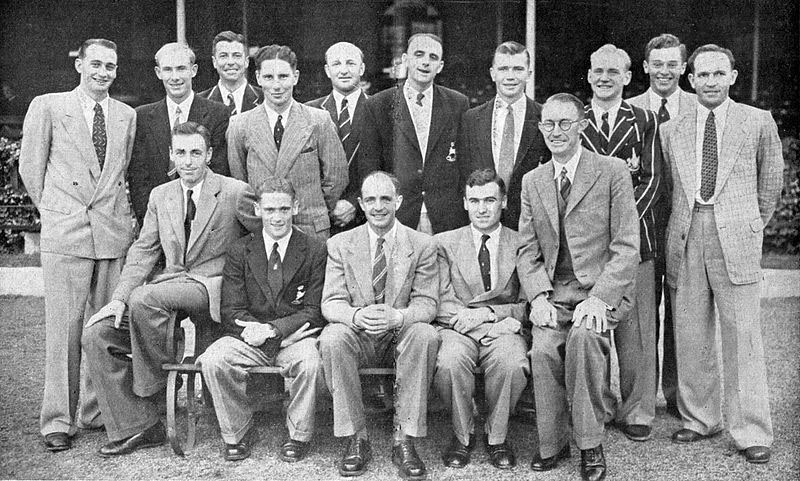
- The South African touring team in 1952–53. Norton is standing, fifth from the left.

Personal information
- Full name: Eric Bertram Norton
- Born: 5 December 1919; Grahamstown, South Africa
- Died: 23 February 2004 (aged 84); Cape Town, South Africa
- Nickname: Pop
- Batting: Right-handed

Domestic team information
- Years: Team
- 1936–37 to 1955–56: Eastern Province

Career statistics
Competition	First-class
Matches	43
Runs scored	1,541
Batting average	24.07
100s/50s	2/6
Top score	111
Catches/stumpings	23/–
- Source: CricketArchive

Eric Bertram "Pop" Norton (5 December 1919 – 23 February 2004), was a South African cricketer and school headmaster.

== Life and career ==
Norton made his debut for Eastern Province in the Currie Cup in 1936–37 against Transvaal in Johannesburg at the age of 17. Batting at number five he hit the second ball he faced for six, and scored 45 and 26 in a low-scoring match. He was less successful in four more games that season and in his only game in 1937–38.

After war service as a captain with the Royal Marine Commandos and graduation from Rhodes University, he resumed his cricket career with a few unsuccessful matches for Eastern Province in 1946–47 and 1947–48. At this stage his eleven first-class matches had produced only 217 runs at 12.76. He next played in 1950–51, when a full season batting at various positions in the order yielded 241 runs at 30.12, including 39 and 54 not out against Griqualand West in Kimberley.

His outstanding season was 1951–52, when, captaining Eastern Province, he made 578 runs at 64.22, topping the national batting averages (among batsmen with more than 200 runs) and coming fourth in the aggregates. In the second match, batting at number four against Western Province in Cape Town, he scored 111 (his first century) and 31 not out. In the fourth match, against Natal in Port Elizabeth, he made 69 and 79 not out. In the sixth match, against Natal in Durban, he made 102 not out in a team total of 239. In each of the latter two innings he ran out of partners as the rest of the batsmen struggled.

He was selected to tour Australasia in 1952–53, the oldest member of the side. He never approached the form he had displayed in South Africa. Before the First Test he scored only 38 runs at 7.60 in three games, and his only fifty came in the match against Victoria before the Fourth Test when, batting at number eight, he made 58 in the first innings. In the ten first-class matches he played in Australia and New Zealand he scored 235 runs at 15.66.

He played nine matches over the next three seasons, making 290 runs at 19.33, with a top score of 56. In his last match, against Natal in Durban in January 1956, he scored 11 and 16, falling victim each time to the leg-spin of Ian Smith, who took fourteen wickets in the match.

He was also a prominent rugby player, who captained the Junior Springboks in Rhodesia in 1950.

Norton had been a pupil of St. Andrew's College in Grahamstown, and he returned there to teach, as well as coaching rugby and cricket. He was Headmaster from 1972 to 1980. During his tenure the school admitted its first black students.
