= Peter May (cricketer) =

English cricketer (1929–1994)

Peter May CBE
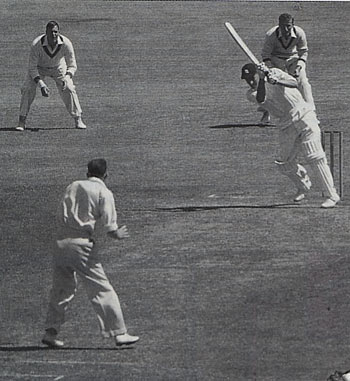

Personal information
- Full name: Peter Barker Howard May
- Born: 31 December 1929; Reading, Berkshire, England
- Died: 27 December 1994 (aged 64); Liphook, Hampshire, England
- Batting: Right-handed
- Role: Batsman

International information
- National side: England
- Test debut (cap 361): 26 July 1951 v South Africa
- Last Test: 17 August 1961 v Australia

Domestic team information
- Years: Team
- 1950–1963: Surrey
- 1950–1952: Cambridge University

Career statistics
| Competition | Test | First-class |
|---|---|---|
| Matches | 66 | 388 |
| Runs scored | 4,537 | 27,592 |
| Batting average | 46.77 | 51.00 |
| 100s/50s | 13/22 | 85/122 |
| Top score | 285* | 285* |
| Balls bowled | – | 102 |
| Wickets | – | 0 |
| Bowling average | – | – |
| 5 wickets in innings | – | – |
| 10 wickets in match | – | – |
| Best bowling | – | – |
| Catches/stumpings | 42/– | 282/– |
- Source: Cricinfo, 19 May 2019

Peter Barker Howard May CBE (31 December 1929 – 27 December 1994) was an English cricketer who played for Surrey County Cricket Club, Cambridge University and England as an amateur. He was described as a "tall and handsome with a batting style that was close to classical, and... the hero of a generation of school boys" and by Wisden as a "schoolboy prodigy" who went on to become "one of England’s finest batsmen". He was made a CBE in 1981 and posthumously inducted into the ICC Cricket Hall of Fame in 2009

== Early career ==
Born in Reading, Berkshire, he was educated at Leighton Park School, Charterhouse and Pembroke College, Cambridge, and at both he was regarded as a batting prodigy as well as playing Eton Fives, winning the Kinnaird Cup in all three years between 1951 and 1953, partnered by his brother, J.W.H. May. Across the 1950s, he was the most consistent and prolific English batsman in both county (representing Surrey) and Test cricket. He made his Test match debut against South Africa at Headingley in 1951, scoring 138, and was then a regular England player until forced out by illness in the early 1960s. May was one of the Wisden Cricketers of the Year in 1952. May was the natural successor to Leonard Hutton as England captain after the successful defence of the Ashes on the 1954–55 tour of Australia.

== Captaincy ==
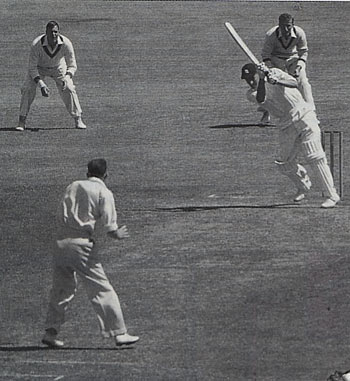
Peter May cracks another on-drive off Bill Johnston of Australia in 1954–55. He was England's top scorer in both the triumphs of 1954–55 and 1956 and the debacle of 1958–59 and was seen by many as England's greatest post-war batsman

May enjoyed a largely successful captaincy of both his county and country. Surrey had been County Champions for seven years running, with May the captain for the last two seasons, and until 1958 England were never defeated under his leadership. He had beaten South Africa 3–2 in 1955, considered by many to have been the most exciting Test series since the war, Australia 2–1 in 1956, the West Indies 3–0 in 1957 and New Zealand 4–0 in 1958. He was widely regarded as the best post-war batsman England produced, tall, strong and disciplined with a near-perfect technique, a straight bat and a complete range of strokes. His standards improved with the responsibilities of captaincy and his Test average as captain was 54.03. His highest score was at Edgbaston in 1957, when England trailed West Indies by 288 runs in the first innings; he made 285 not out, the highest score by an England captain until Graham Gooch's 333 in 1990, adding 411 with Colin Cowdrey (154) – which remained an England record for any wicket until 2024 – and destroyed the mesmerising hold the spinner Sonny Ramadhin had over English batsmen. In the low scoring Ashes series of 1956 he had made 453 runs (90.60) and was out only once for less than 50, when he made 43. Although himself a highly educated amateur and a gentleman he realised that the old class divisions in English cricket were breaking down and under Len Hutton's leadership the amateur and professional had merged. He enjoyed the complete loyalty of the team and the selectors and was ready to help his players and smooth down feathers. As a captain he was a strict team disciplinarian who expected high standards, he was ruthless when the occasion demanded, but could be inflexible and unimaginative and lacked the charisma of a natural leader. In 1958–59 he played too defensively and surrendered the initiative too readily to Richie Benaud and he concentrated on saving runs instead of trying to get batsmen out. Faced with Ian Meckiff's questionable bowling, in the disastrous First Test, he declined to make an official complaint as he believed it would appear unsporting. Meckiff was, in fact, several years later, called for an illegal bowling action, ending his career. After the Australian tour May beat New Zealand 1–0, India 5–0 and led England to its first series victory in the West Indies 1–0. He lost 2–1 to the 1961 Australians and retired due to ill-health having been captain in a then record 41 Tests (20 wins, 10 defeats and 11 draws), Benaud being the only man to defeat him in a Test series. He retired entirely from first-class cricket in 1963, taking up a post in the City with the insurance brokerage Willis Faber Dumas; now Willis Group.

== Cricket administrator ==
May succeeded Alec Bedser as Chairman of the England cricket selectors in 1982 and held the post for seven years, including presiding over the notorious 1988 Summer of four captains. He served as President of the Marylebone Cricket Club and posthumously as President of Surrey County Cricket Club from 1995 to 1996.

== Personal life ==
May served his National Service in the Writer branch of the Royal Navy. He married Virginia Gilligan, a daughter of the former England captain Harold Gilligan, in 1959; they had four daughters.

May was appointed a Commander of the Order of the British Empire (CBE) in the 1981 Birthday Honours.

May died at Liphook, Hampshire, from a brain tumour on 27 December 1994, four days before what would have been his 65th birthday. A stand at The Oval is named in his honour.

== Bibliography ==
- Lodge, Derek. P.B.H. May C.B.E.-His Record Innings-by-Innings. Famous Cricketers. Vol. 25. The Association of Cricket Statisticians and Historians.

Sporting positions
| Preceded by Len Hutton | English national cricket captain 1955–1960 | Succeeded by Colin Cowdrey |
| Preceded by Colin Cowdrey | English national cricket captain 1961 | Succeeded by Ted Dexter |
