= Johnny Wardle =

English cricketer (1923–1985)

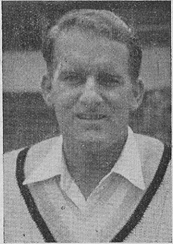
- Wardle in 1954

Personal information
- Full name: John Henry Wardle
- Born: 8 January 1923; Ardsley, Barnsley, West Riding of Yorkshire, England
- Died: 23 July 1985 (aged 62); Hatfield, Doncaster, Yorkshire, England
- Batting: Left-handed
- Bowling: Slow left-arm orthodox Left-arm unorthodox

International information
- National side: England
- Test debut (cap 333): 11 February 1948 v West Indies
- Last Test: 20 June 1957 v West Indies

Domestic team information
- Years: Team
- 1946–1958: Yorkshire

Career statistics
Competition	Test	First-class
Matches	28	412
Runs scored	653	7,333
Batting average	19.78	16.08
100s/50s	0/2	0/18
Top score	66	79
Balls bowled	6,597	102,626
Wickets	102	1,846
Bowling average	20.39	18.97
5 wickets in innings	5	134
10 wickets in match	1	29
Best bowling	7/36	9/25
Catches/stumpings	12/–	257/–
- Source: CricketArchive, 2 March 2020

Johnny Wardle (8 January 1923 – 23 July 1985) was an English spin bowling cricketer whose Test Match career lasted between 1948 and 1957. His Test bowling average of 20.39 is the lowest in Test cricket by any recognised spin bowler since the First World War.

Wardle played for Yorkshire, England, and later for Cambridgeshire.

== Life and career ==
John Henry Wardle was born in Ardsley, Barnsley, West Riding of Yorkshire. He attended Wath Grammar School from age 11 to 15.

Wardle, though mainly a classical orthodox left-arm finger-spinner, was probably the most versatile of all the great spin bowlers, and he was capable both of originality and accuracy. His ability to bowl left-arm wrist spinners that turned and bounced much more sharply, made him preferred over Tony Lock in his heyday. Wardle is the only English bowler to master this unusual style, and it gave him many of his greatest successes, notably in South Africa in 1956–1957, where he achieved the feat of taking 100 wickets in a season outside England. He was able, when circumstances allowed, to bowl slow left-arm wrist-spin and did so at the highest level.

Wardle was also a dangerous left-handed hitter, whose stocky build permitted him to drive powerfully. Often his hitting against opposing spinners suggested that the defensive batting so characteristic of 1950s and 1960s first-class cricket was not the most effective method of play.

Wardle, whose family were miners, took to cricket during the Second World War and was so successful as a spin bowler and hard-hitting batsman that Yorkshire engaged him when looking for a successor to Hedley Verity, who had been killed in the war. Wardle only played one match in 1946, when the 43-year-old Arthur Booth's economy rate saw him head the averages, but when Booth fell ill with arthritis, Wardle took his place. In spite of a dry summer in 1947, Wardle was chosen for a largely experimental, Gubby Allen-led, Marylebone Cricket Club (MCC) tour of the West Indies. He was disappointing on that tour, but his skill developed in the wet summer of the following year. Though an injury wiped out a quarter of his 1949 season, Wardle was deadly on the few rain-affected pitches that summer, and his bowling helped Yorkshire to make a late, albeit unsuccessful, tilt at the County Championship title.

1950 saw him play in a home Test for the first time, but apart from some free hitting against Ramadhin and Valentine, whose spin bowling routed England, he did little of note. Nonetheless, with Yorkshire's bowling not nearly so strong as in the days of Bowes and Verity, Wardle's capacity for hard work revealed itself fully for the first time: he bowled more balls than any bowler since Tich Freeman in 1934, and his 741 maidens showed his accuracy. His 172 wickets that season was Wardle's career best return.

In 1951, Wardle was unsuccessful in challenging Jim Laker and Roy Tattersall for a Test spin bowling place. However, with Bob Appleyard hit by illness, Wardle's workrate reached such levels in the following two seasons that his total of 20,723 balls delivered in these two seasons, has been beaten only by Tich Freeman, and his 11,084 balls in 1952, is the fourth-highest aggregate ever delivered. During August 1952, Wardle sent down 165 overs in two consecutive games. Though Yorkshire had a decline in fortunes in 1953, Wardle took 4 for 7 on a soft pitch at Old Trafford, and he was named one of the Wisden Cricketers of the Year, and he toured the West Indies again. The competition from Laker and Lock, though, gave him little chance to distinguish himself, although in two innings of 39 and 66, he showed the virtue in hitting against Ramadhin and Valentine. The latter innings were of real consequence as Wardle, batting with Len Hutton, put on 105 for the seventh wicket which heralded a series-saving victory for England.

By 1954, with Fred Trueman and Appleyard back in the team, Yorkshire rebounded and Wardle was able to become an enterprising attacking spinner once more. In this role, he took 16 wickets against Sussex, and bowled so well against Pakistan that he toured Australia with Len Hutton's MCC side that winter. Apart from 5 for 79 and 3 for 51 on a flood-soaked pitch at Sydney, he had little to do. His use of left-arm off-breaks and googlies the following summer allowed Wardle to reach almost 200 first-class and 15 Test wickets. In the wet summer of 1956, Lock was again preferred in the Test side, to the disgust of the Yorkshire members, but Wardle, chiefly bowling wrist-spin, baffled all South African batsmen that winter on pitches giving him little help. In the second Test at Newlands Cricket Ground, Cape Town, he took 7 for 36 to dismiss South Africa for 72, and may have taken more than 26 Test wickets but for injury. On that tour, Wardle claimed 90 first-class wickets at 12 runs apiece.

1957 was a disappointing year, with Wardle's workrate finally appearing to decline, and Lock tightening his grip on the Test place after Wardle failed at Lord's. Although in the favourable conditions of 1958 Wardle was successful, friction between him and the Yorkshire committee, became intolerable when Wardle announced he would write an article in the Daily Mail, that was openly critical of the running of Yorkshire County Cricket Club. Although MCC had chosen Wardle for the coming Ashes tour, they withdrew immediately. Wardle made this announcement, and Yorkshire responded by dropping Wardle for the Roses Match with Lancashire. They never recalled him, and when Wardle announced he would play for Nottinghamshire, Yorkshire steadfastly refused to allow special registration.

Wardle was big enough to admit his troubles were largely of his own making, and any ill feelings on his part was forgotten when he helped Yorkshire and England off-spinner Geoff Cope to iron out the problems in his action, which had occasionally had him 'called' for throwing.

Wardle's autobiography, Happy Go Johnny, was published in 1957.

Consequently, Wardle played the rest of his cricket as a professional in the Lancashire League for Nelson and Rishton, and until 1969 with Cambridgeshire in the Minor Counties Championship.

Yorkshire and the MCC both tried to atone by making Wardle an honorary life member, and he took up managing a country club near Doncaster.

Johnny Wardle died, after never recovering from an operation on a brain tumour, in Hatfield, Doncaster, Yorkshire, in July 1985, at the age of 62.

A biography, Johnny Wardle: Cricket Conjuror (ISBN 978-0715390535), by Alan Hill, was published in 1988.

Preceded by Baloo Gupte	Nelson Cricket Club; Professional; 1959–1962	Succeeded by Des Hoare
