= Ken Funston =

South African cricketer (1925–2005)

- Funston in 1952

Personal information
- Born: 3 December 1925
- Died: 15 April 2005 (aged 79)
- Batting: Right-handed

International information
- National side: South Africa
- Test debut: 5 December 1952 v Australia
- Last Test: 28 February 1958 v Australia

Career statistics
Competition	Test	First-class
Matches	19	84
Runs scored	824	4,164
Batting average	25.75	30.39
100s/50s	0/5	5/23
Top score	92	160
Balls bowled	–	48
Wickets	–	2
Bowling average	–	21.50
5 wickets in innings	–	0
10 wickets in match	–	0
Best bowling	–	2/32
Catches/stumpings	7/–	36/–
- Source: Cricinfo, 11 August 2021

Kenneth James Funston (3 December 1925 – 15 April 2005) was a South African cricketer who played in 18 Test matches between 1952 and 1958.

His son, Graham, played first-class cricket in South Africa in the 1970s.
