= Headley Keith =

South African cricketer (1927–1997)

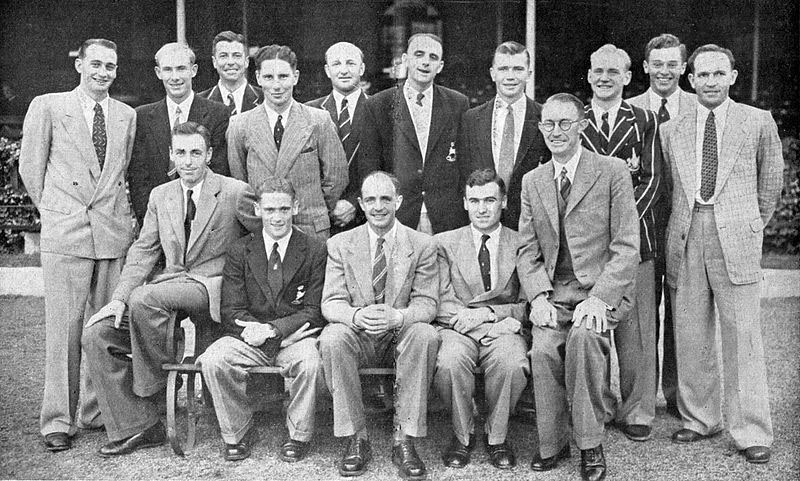
- The South African touring team in 1952–53. Keith is standing, fourth from the right.

Personal information
- Full name: Headley James Keith
- Born: 25 October 1927; Dundee, Natal Province
- Died: 16 November 1997 (aged 70); Pennington, KwaZulu-Natal
- Batting: Left-handed
- Bowling: Slow left-arm orthodox

International information
- National side: South Africa (1953–1957)
- Test debut: 6 February 1953 v Australia
- Last Test: 25 January 1957 v England

Domestic team information
- Years: Team
- 1950/51–1957/58: Natal

Career statistics
Competition	Test	First-class
Matches	8	74
Runs scored	318	3,203
Batting average	21.19	30.50
100s/50s	0/2	8/14
Top score	73	193
Balls bowled	108	7,915
Wickets	0	79
Bowling average	–	27.51
5 wickets in innings	–	2
10 wickets in match	–	0
Best bowling	–	5/27
Catches/stumpings	9/–	61/–
- Source: CricInfo, 19 August 2018

Headley James Keith (25 October 1927 – 17 November 1997) was a South African Test cricketer. He played eight Test matches for South Africa in the 1950s.

Keith was born at Dundee in Natal Province in 1927. He made his first-class cricket debut for Natal in October 1950 in the Currie Cup against Border as a left-handed batsman, becoming "an important component of the powerful Natal batting line-up" of the time as well as contributing "useful" slow-left arm bowling in domestic cricket.

Keith toured Australia in 1952/53 with the South African national side, making his Test debut in February 1953 at the Melbourne Cricket Ground after becoming the first South African to score two centuries in the same match in Australia against Victoria immediately before the Test match on the same ground. He went on to tour England with South Africa in 1955, playing in four Tests, and played in the first three Tests during England's tour of South Africa the following winter. He was described as a "watchful rather than dominant" batsman at Test level, scoring half-centuries against England at Lord's and Headingley.

Keith was voted South African Cricket Annual Cricketer of the Year in 1955. His final three first-class appearances came in November 1957. He made a total of 74 first-class cricket appearances throughout his career, 37 of them for Natal. He died in November 1997 at Pennington in KwaZulu-Natal aged 70.
