= Herb Elphinston =

Australian cricket umpire (1905–1966)

Herbert Alfred Rhys Elphinston (25 February 1905 at Leichhardt, Sydney – 8 July 1966 at Forestville, Sydney) was an Australian Test cricket umpire.

== Umpiring career ==
After playing club cricket in Sydney as a bowler, Herb Elphinston took up umpiring in the 1930s. He umpired 45 first-class matches between 1945 and 1954, most of them in Sydney. He umpired ten Test matches between 1948 and 1953. His first Test was between Australia and India at the Melbourne Cricket Ground on 1 January to 5 January 1948, a match comfortably won by Australia with Don Bradman scoring a century in each innings. Elphinston's partner in this match was Andy Barlow. His last Test was between Australia and South Africa at the Sydney Cricket Ground on 9 January to 13 January 1953, where the home team won by an innings with Neil Harvey scoring 190 and Ray Lindwall taking 8 wickets. Mel McInnes was Elphinston's partner in this match.

Elphinston was a leader in warning fast bowlers against the persistent use of short-pitched deliveries (bouncers), resulting in Australian first-class umpires being given more power to intervene against intimidatory bowling.

== Outside cricket ==
Elphinston attended Canterbury Boys' High School in Sydney. He worked as a clerk in the timekeeper's office at Sydney County Council. He died in 1966; his wife Miriam died in 1965. They had three daughters.

== See also ==
- List of test umpires
