= Doug Ring =

Australian cricketer (1918–2003)

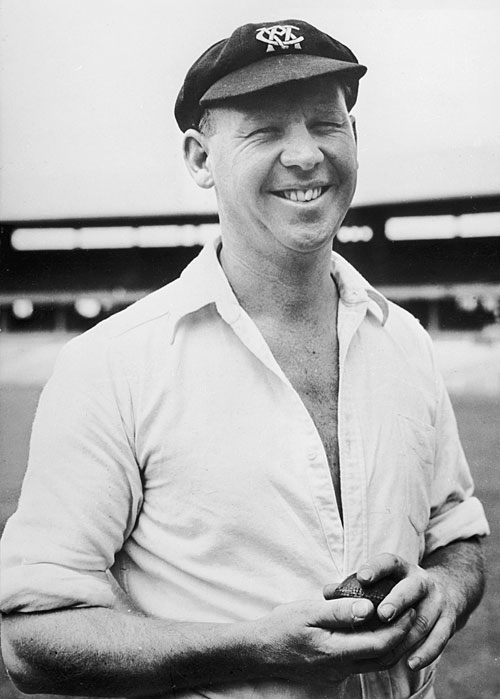
- Ring in 1948

Personal information
- Full name: Douglas Thomas Ring
- Born: 14 October 1918; Hobart, Tasmania, Australia
- Died: 23 June 2003 (aged 84); Melbourne, Victoria, Australia
- Height: 183 cm (6 ft 0 in)
- Batting: Right-handed
- Bowling: Right-arm leg break and googly
- Role: All rounder

International information
- National side: Australia
- Test debut (cap 181): 6 February 1948 v India
- Last Test: 25 June 1953 v England

Domestic team information
- Years: Team
- 1938/39–1952/53: Victoria

Career statistics
Competition	Test	First-class
Matches	13	129
Runs scored	426	3,418
Batting average	22.42	23.25
100s/50s	0/4	1/20
Top score	67	145
Balls bowled	3,024	27,956
Wickets	35	451
Bowling average	37.28	28.48
5 wickets in innings	2	21
10 wickets in match	0	2
Best bowling	6/72	7/88
Catches/stumpings	5/–	93/–
- Source: CricketArchive, 29 February 2008

Douglas Thomas Ring (14 October 1918 – 23 June 2003) was an Australian cricketer who played for Victoria and for Australia in 13 Test matches between 1948 and 1953. In 129 first-class cricket matches, he took 426 wickets bowling leg spin, and he had a top score of 145 runs, which was the only century of his career.

Ring made his Test debut against India in the 1947–48 season and was picked for Australia's tour of England in 1948, the so-called "Invincibles" team, but played in only one Test match on the tour. He had greater success against West Indies in 1951–52, and South Africa the following season and made a second less successful tour of England in 1953. Following cricket, Ring held positions in industry administration in Victoria, and became a cricket radio commentator and later host of Australia's World of Sport.

== Early years and cricket career ==
Born in Hobart, Ring moved to Victoria as a child, and attended Melbourne High School. After playing schoolboy cricket, he played the final matches of the 1935–36 season with the first grade team at Prahran. He batted right-handed and bowled right-arm leg breaks. He topped the Victorian Cricket Association's second-grade bowling averages and joined the Richmond first grade team.

=== First-class cricket ===
In 1938, after five matches with Richmond, he was selected for Victoria. In his first match, in December 1938, he took four New South Wales wickets, including Sid Barnes, bowling alongside Chuck Fleetwood-Smith. In the following game, batting at No 9, he put on 112 for the eighth wicket with Lindsay Hassett, making 51 runs himself. He did not appear in Victoria's other Sheffield Shield matches that 1938–39 season, but later, playing against Western Australia in Perth in a first-class non-Shield match – Western Australia did not join the Sheffield Shield until after the Second World War – he took six wickets for 97 runs in Western Australia's first innings.

In the 1939–40 season, Ring played in all of Victoria's Sheffield Shield matches, and though he did not improve on either his best bowling or best batting figures, he took over as the team's principal spin bowler from Fleetwood-Smith, with 28 wickets in the six matches against the senior player's 17. At the end of the season, he was picked for "The Rest" team, composed of the best players from the other states, for the match against the Shield winners, New South Wales, though he was upstaged by the 48-year-old Clarrie Grimmett, who took 10 wickets to Ring's one in the match. Wisden noted in a brief report on the 1939–40 Sheffield Shield in its 1940 edition that Bill O'Reilly, Grimmett and Ring "carried off chief bowling honours in the competition". Prior to the Second World War, the Australian captain Don Bradman said of Ring: "If I were picking an Australian XI to go to England now, one of the first men on my list would be Doug Ring".

In the first-class season of 1940–41, with the proposed England tour and the Sheffield Shield competition both cancelled because of the war, Ring played half a dozen first-class matches for Victoria, achieving little with his bowling, but making 72 when promoted to No 3 batsman as a nightwatchman against South Australia at Adelaide and following that up with 60 against Queensland at Brisbane.

The war then interrupted Ring's first-class career. Ring joined the Australian Army and served with an anti-aircraft regiment in New Guinea. During his military service he injured his back, displacing a disc. The injury flared up from time to time, especially in cold weather, and this affected his ability to bowl to a consistent length.

== Post-war career ==
Ring's war service in the Far East meant that he did not appear in the Australian Services XI that made such an impact in England. He resumed his state cricket career in 1946–47, and made the only century of his career, 145, against Queensland at Melbourne, sharing a sixth wicket partnership of 288 runs with Sam Loxton, who made 232. The batting success was offset by less effective bowling: he took just 18 Sheffield Shield wickets, barely half the number (33) achieved by Victoria's left-arm spinner George Tribe, who was picked for three Tests against England that season, but then turned his back on Australian cricket and moved to England.

Victoria in the 1947–48 season was a weak team and finished bottom of the Sheffield Shield table. Ring took 23 wickets, the highest of any Victoria bowler, in Shield matches but at the high average of 33 runs apiece. His best bowling of the season came in a match against Tasmania where he improved his career-best bowling figures by taking six for 84 in the first innings and followed that with five for 59 in the second innings for his first 10-wicket match haul (11–143).

=== Test debut ===
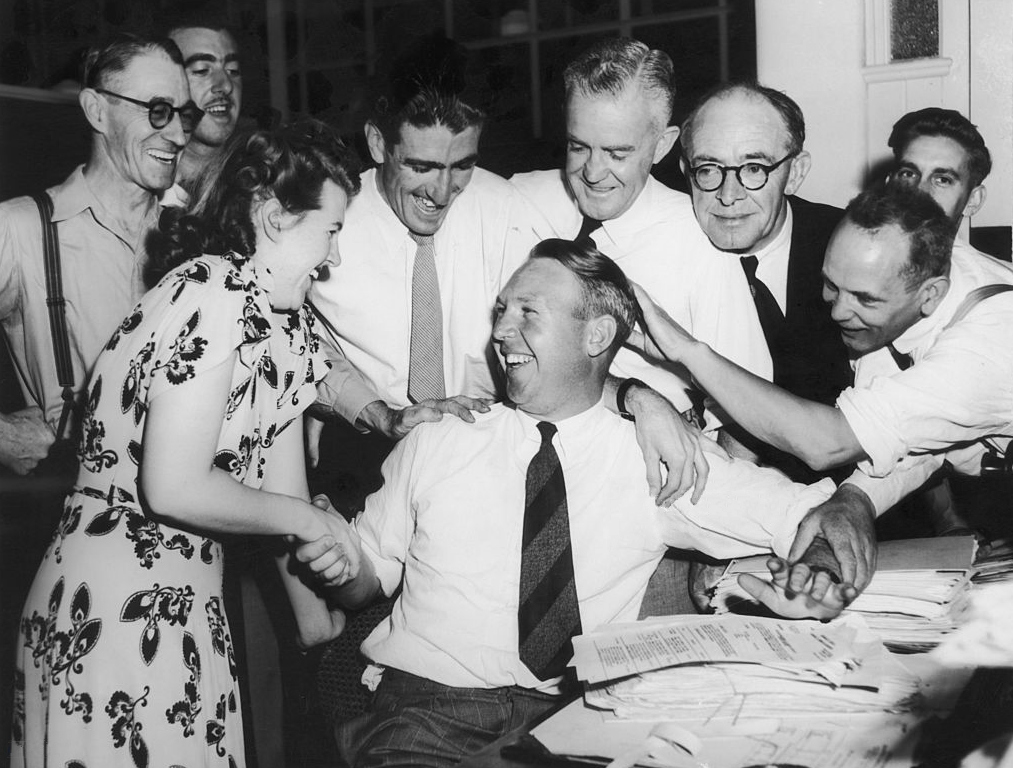
Doug Ring is congratulated by his colleagues at the Melbourne Department of Commerce on 25 February 1948 after being selected to tour England.

It was a good time to make an eye-catching performance: the next match at the MCG was the fifth and final Test against India and Ring was selected, replacing Colin McCool, who had taken only four wickets in three matches of the five-Test series, and making his Test debut. After Australia made 575 for eight declared, with Ring making 11 when batting at No 10, Ring bowled 36 eight-ball overs, taking three for 103 as India reached 331, and then took three further wickets for just 17 in a second-innings capitulation for just 67. With match figures of six for 120 in his first game, Ring was picked for the 1948 tour of England, the tour led by Donald Bradman that became known, through its unbeaten record, as "The Invincibles".

Though the 1948 tour of England was a triumph for the Australians, Ring was not prominent in the success. The faster bowlers, headed by Ray Lindwall and Keith Miller, dominated the bowling attack, and with a new ball allowed after just 55 overs of play, spin bowlers made little impact in the big matches. Ring, said Wisden in its summary of the tour, "was never a trump card in the pack". Such was the strength of the Australian bowling that Ring's 60 first-class wickets at an average of 21.81 on the tour was the highest bowling average of the regular bowlers. The strength of the batting team also meant that he batted only 14 times in his 19 first-class matches on the tour, and he passed 50 only once. He played in one Test match—the last of the five-match series, at The Oval. He did not bowl in the first innings as England were dismissed for just 52, and took one wicket—that of Allan Watkins—in 28 economical overs in the second innings as Bradman's final Test ended in an innings victory.

Ring and fellow fringe members of the squad, Ron Hamence and Colin McCool, would refer themselves as the "ground-staff" as it was unlikely that the tour selectors would include them in the Test team on the 1948 tour.

Over the next three Australian seasons, Ring played regularly for Victoria and appeared also in some lesser representative matches. He figured in both the Donald Bradman Testimonial Match and the Alan Kippax-Bert Oldfield Testimonial, which were the big set-piece matches of the 1948–49 season, the latter being used as a "Test trial" for the 1949–50 tour of South Africa, for which Ring was not picked. Instead, in early 1950 he went on a non-Test playing tour of New Zealand where, in the three-day match between New Zealand and the touring team, he took seven for 88 in the home team's first innings, which remained the best figures of his first-class career. By the 1950–51 season, when Ring had one of his worst batting but better bowling seasons for Victoria, he had been overtaken in the Test match pecking order by his Victoria team-mate, Jack Iverson, whose quirky all-sorts of spin bowling was used in all five Tests.

=== Test regular ===
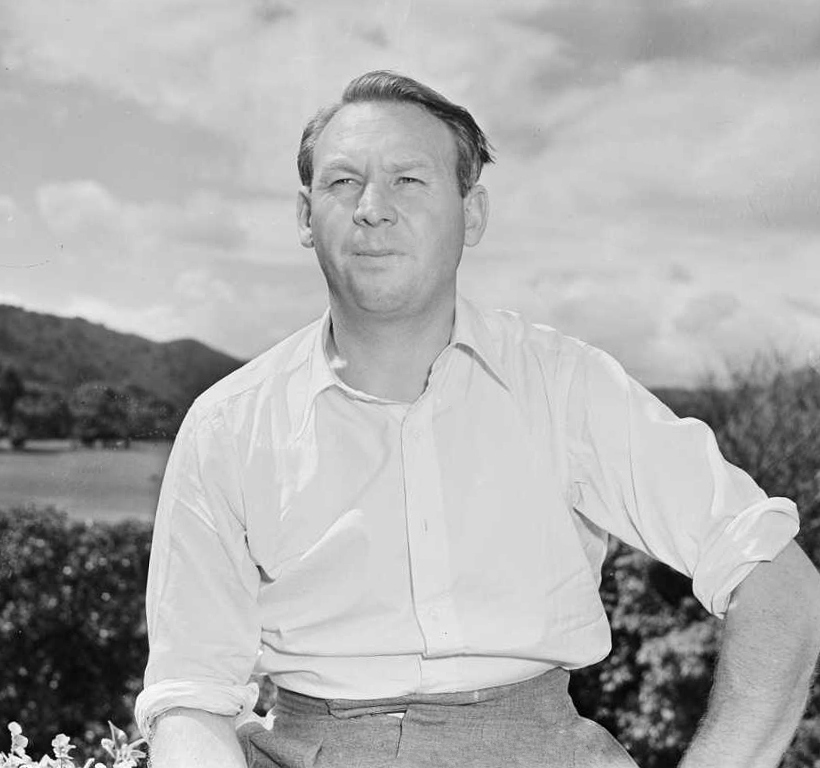
Ring in New Zealand in 1950

Iverson's career turned out to be meteoric on the downward trajectory as well as the upward, and when the West Indies arrived for their 1951–52 tour in November 1951 in what was billed as a "cricket championship of the world", the Australian Test selectors turned to Ring for the spin option to the pace of Lindwall, Miller and Bill Johnston for the first match at Brisbane. With the famous spin twins of Sonny Ramadhin and Alf Valentine in the opposition, Ring was the least experienced main line bowler at this level on either team – but he proved to be the matchwinner. Having taken two wickets in West Indies' first innings, he took six for 80 runs in the second, and his dismissal of Frank Worrell and captain John Goddard with the last two balls of the second day swung the advantage towards Australia. In the second innings, Wisden reported, West Indies' batsmen were "guilty of rash strokes against the high-flighted leg-breaks of Ring, whose bowling contained abundant guile". Ring was also at the wicket when the match was won, by three wickets, though his own contribution was just six runs.

Ring's main contribution to the second Test, at Sydney, which Australia won by seven wickets, came with bat rather than ball. He took only one wicket in a match made controversial by liberal use of the bumper by the faster Australian bowlers. But batting at No 9 and joining Lindwall at 372 for seven, just 10 ahead of the West Indies' first innings total, his 65 in 102 minutes helped add 113 before he was ninth out.

In the third Test, too, Ring's batting made more impact than his bowling. A wet pitch led to 22 wickets falling on the first day, and temporary Australian captain Arthur Morris rejigged his batting order at the end of the day, opening the second innings with Ian Johnson and Gil Langley, sending Geff Noblet in when Johnson was out and then Ring as a second nightwatchman when Noblet was out. Ring lasted into the second day when conditions were easier, and top-scored for the Australian team with 67, which remained his best score in Tests. He took three of the four wickets that fell as West Indies successfully chased a target of 233 on Christmas Day.

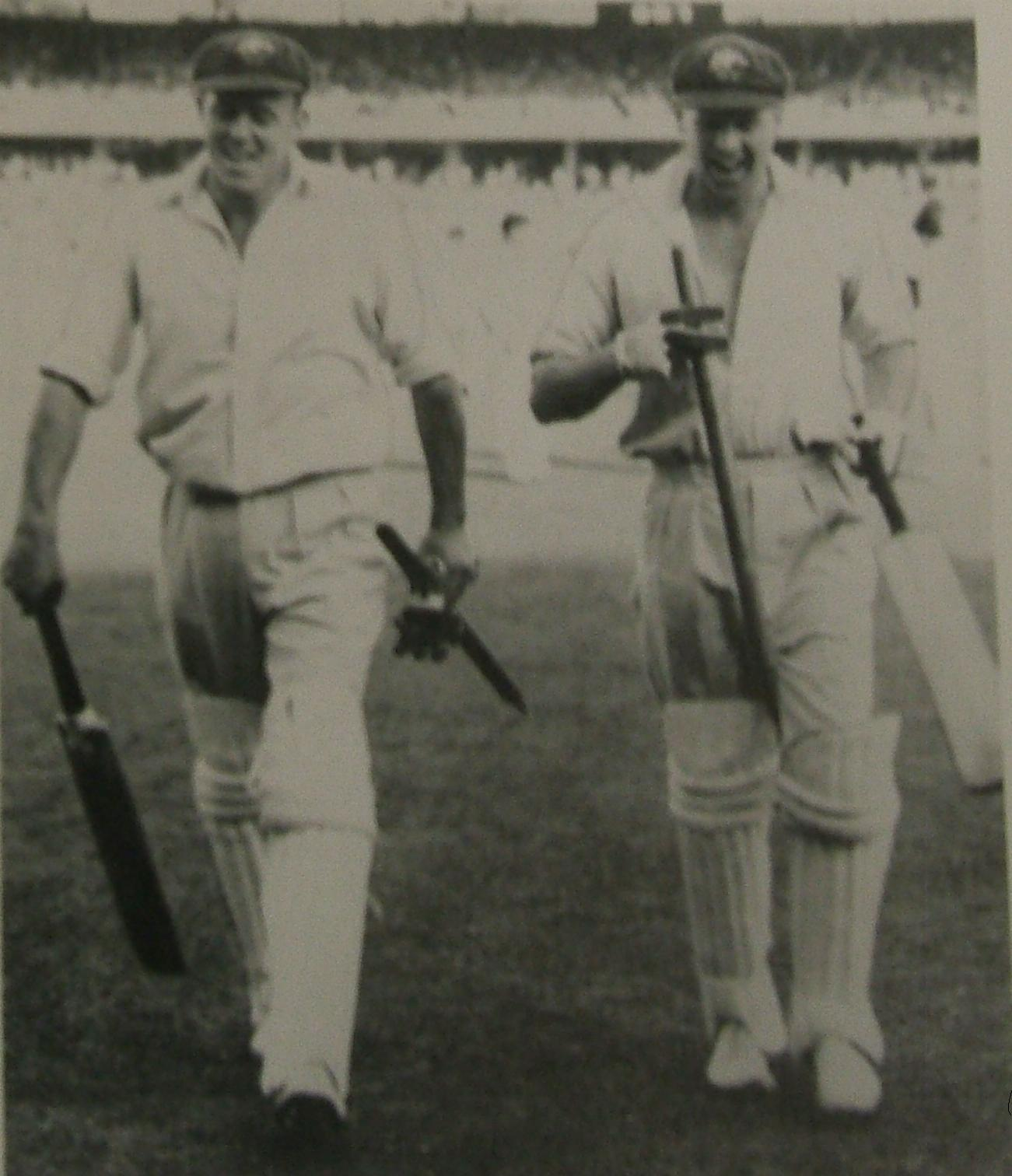
Ring (right) and Bill Johnston (left) leave the field after their unbroken last wicket stand guided Australia to victory over the West Indies in the Fourth Test at the MCG in 1951–52.

It was the fourth Test at Melbourne that cemented Ring's place as part of Australian cricket folklore. Again, his bowling was little used, and he failed to take a wicket. But his batting this time proved decisive. Chasing 260 to win, Australia had reached 218 for seven when Ring came in at No 9. Century-maker Lindsay Hassett departed with no further runs added, and Langley was out at 222, so when last batsman Bill Johnston joined Ring, 38 were still needed to win. In Wisden's words, "no one regards Johnston as other than a 'rabbit' with the bat". But the West Indies pushed the fielders in nearer the bat, allowing Ring to reach the boundary by clearing the fielders. Wisden reported: "Johnston played a comparatively passive role while Ring hit vigorously, gaining a series of boundaries by lofty drives which may have resulted in catches had the field been set deep enough for this known hitter." Ring made an unbeaten 32, and "earned most of the credit", Wisden said, though Johnston hit the winning run, which also won the series for Australia.

The fifth Test, which saw the debut of Richie Benaud alongside Ring, was an anticlimax, and Ring contributed little with either bat or ball to a large Australian victory. In the series as a whole, among the regular players, Ring finished behind only Hassett and Miller as a batsman, with 197 runs at an average of 28.14, and he took 13 wickets for exactly 30 apiece.

In 1952–53, the South Africans were the visitors to Australia, and Ring got an early sight of the team by captaining Victoria against them, top-scoring in the state's first innings with 56. In the first Test at Brisbane, he repeated his performance of a year earlier by taking six wickets, this time for 72 runs, his best Test bowling performance, in South Africa's first innings. The South Africans "survived Australia's pace bowling well enough, but few met the leg-breaks of Ring with assurance," Wisden reported. "His varied flight and pace worried batsmen attempting too often to play him from the crease." He was unsuccessful in South Africa's second innings.

Across the rest of the five-match Test series against South Africa, Ring took only seven more wickets, and he tended to be expensive in terms of the number of runs conceded from his bowling. In the second match, which the South Africans won, he took three wickets for 187, and, batting at No 10, contributed a quick-fire 53 out of the last 74 runs when the match had already effectively been lost. Two weeks later, in the third match, he took just one wicket in a crushing Australian victory, but contributed 58 out of 75 in just 68 minutes from the unusually lofty batting position of No 8. The fourth and fifth Tests brought him few runs or wickets. In the series as a whole, Ring scored 184 runs at an average of 23 runs per innings and took 13 wickets at the high average of 48.

As a proven Test player and the senior spin bowler, Ring was chosen for his second tour of England in 1953, this time under the captaincy of Hassett. It proved not much happier than his 1948 experience, though in a less strong team his eventual wicket tally, 68 first-class wickets at an average of 19.89, placed him third among the regular bowlers.

Ring was, though, just one of three leg-spin bowlers, alongside Benaud and Ring's Victoria colleague Jack Hill, and, said Wisden, "none of the three ... was seen to advantage in the Tests". Indeed, Wisden added, "there was an appreciable weakness due to the absence of top-class spin to support the thrust of Lindwall, Miller and Johnston".

In the event, Ring played in only one Test, the second of the five-match series, played at Lord's. He took two wickets, the same number as Benaud, on a pitch allegedly susceptible to spin and scored 18 and 7 as the match ended in a tight draw.

Outside the Tests in England, Ring took five wickets in an innings five times and, though mostly fairly ineffective with the bat, hit 88 against Lancashire, his second highest first-class score. At the end of the England tour, he retired from both first-class and Test cricket.

=== Later career ===
Outside cricket, Ring was employed by the Victorian Department of Primary Industries from 1946 to 1982, where his supervisor was Les Menzies, brother of Australian Prime Minister Robert Menzies. In 1958, he entered the media as a cricket commentator on Melbourne radio station 3DB. In 1961, he moved to television, where he was a popular presenter of the HSV-7 program World of Sport. Ring had three children with his wife Lesley. He died in Melbourne on 23 June 2003 at the age of 84.

== Style ==
Ring was a large man, 6 feet (183 cm) tall, and with his large hands he was able to impart plenty of spin on the ball, although he was not usually eager to loft the ball into the air, especially in English conditions. As a batsman, he was good enough to be considered a genuine all-rounder; however, his habit of playing the ball in the air prevented him from scoring more runs. Ring never bought himself a bat, instead choosing to rely on a bat he borrowed from the Victorian Cricket Association practice kit.

== Test match performance ==
		Batting				Bowling			
Opposition	Matches	Runs	Average	High score	100 / 50	Runs	Wickets	Average	Best (Inns)
England	2	34	11.33	18	0/0	171	3	57.00	2/84
India	1	11	41.00	11	0/0	120	6	20.00	3/17
South Africa	5	184	23.00	58	0/2	624	13	48.00	6/72
West Indies	5	197	28.14	67	0/2	390	13	30.00	6/80
Overall	13	426	22.42	67	0/4	1305	35	37.28	6/72

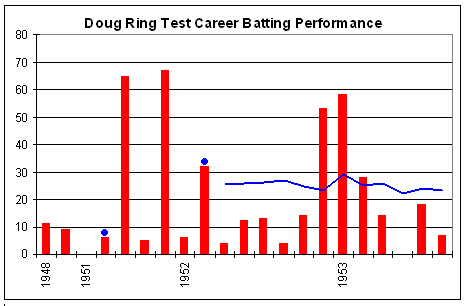
An innings-by-innings breakdown of Rings's Test match batting career, showing runs scored (red bars) and the average of the last 10 innings (blue line)
