= Mel McInnes =

Australian cricket umpire (1915–1996)

Melville James McInnes OAM (30 August 1915 in Prospect, South Australia – 23 July 1996 in Adelaide, South Australia) was an Australian cricket Test match umpire.

He umpired 16 Test matches between 1951 and 1959. His first match was between Australia and the West Indies at Adelaide on 22 to 25 December 1951 (the first Test to include play on Christmas Day), won by the West Indies after dismissing Australia for 82 in the first innings. McInnes' partner in this match was Ron Wright.

McInnes' first international match was the England against South Australia match in January 1951. He no-balled Doug Wright three balls in succession for overstepping, and this courageous act may have led to his first Test appointment the following year.

His last match – also at Adelaide and with Ron Wright as his partner - was between Australia and England on 30 January to 5 February 1959. This was won by Australia by 10 wickets largely due to 170 by Colin McDonald and 9 wickets to Richie Benaud. McDonald pulled a thigh muscle and had resumed batting with a runner, when a Run out appeal was made at the bowler’s end. McInnes had moved to the same side as the runner to view the action, and after giving McDonald out to the appeal, had to reverse his decision, as the runner was behind him and out of his view.

In the 1979 Australia Day Honours McInnes was awarded an Order of Australia medal (OAM) for his umpiring services. According to his Wisden obituary he "won a solid reputation for his judgement, impartiality and bearing, but became mired in controversy on the 1958-59 tour [of Australia by England] when he was blamed by the English press after some bad decisions and for not stamping out throwing and dragging among the Australian fast bowlers". (Presumably Wisden had bowlers Ian Meckiff and Gordon Rorke in mind with this comment.) Johnnie Moyes in 1959 thought "McInnes, in my opinion, ranks with Hele and Crockett as the finest Australia has produced … McInnes adopted the English idea of never rushing into a decision and perhaps that is why he makes so few mistakes".

McInnes stood six feet four and a half inches tall, and played Australian rules football for North Adelaide and cricket for Prospect before enlisting in the AIF in 1940. He served as a captain in the Middle East and in New Guinea. He worked in the state public service.

== See also ==
- Australian Test Cricket Umpires
- List of test umpires

== Bibliography ==
- Moyes, A. G., Australian Cricket: A History, Sydney, Angus & Robertson, 1959.
- Pollard, Jack, Australian Cricket: 1948-1995, The Packer Years. Sydney, The Book Company, 1995.
- Wisden Cricketers’ Almanack, 1997 edition (obituary, p. 1410)
