= List of Rhodesian representative cricketers =

The Rhodesian cricket team represented originally the British colony of Southern Rhodesia and later the unilaterally independent state of Rhodesia.

Rhodesia's inaugural first-class match commenced on 16 March 1905 against Transvaal at Old Wanderers in Johannesburg, South Africa and its first limited overs match on 13 December 1970, against Natal at Police B Ground, Salisbury, Rhodesia. In all, 242 cricketers represented Rhodesia in either first-class or List A cricket between 1905 and 1980, when the Rhodesian cricket team was renamed as the Zimbabwe-Rhodesia cricket team before adopting its current name Zimbabwe cricket team in 1981.

When Rhodesia participated in South Africa's domestic competitions, Rhodesian players were eligible to play for South Africa as for cricketing purposes were under the authority of that country's administrators until independence in 1980. Several of the players listed also represented Zimbabwe in Test and One Day International cricket and one, John Traicos, represented South Africa and Zimbabwe.

While some of the cricketers listed below represented other teams the information included is solely for their career with Rhodesia, including matches played by the "Rhodesian Invitational XI".

== Key ==
- First – Year of debut
- Last – Year of latest game
- Apps – Number of matches played
- – Player has played a Test match or Limited Overs International for Zimbabwe.
- - Player has played a Test match or Limited Overs International for a country other than Zimbabwe.

== Cricketers ==
Name	First	Last	Apps	First	Last	Apps	Notes
Name	First-class			List A			Notes
Scotty Adamson	1931/32	1931/32	5	-	-	-	
David Alers	-	-	-	1976/77	1976/77	1	Nephew of Charles and Robert Wooler.
Jock Anderson	1904/05	1909/10	2	-	-	-	
Peter Anderson	1950/51	1950/51	6	–	–	-	
Allan Armstrong	1938/39	1938/39	1	–	–	-	
Teek Arnold	1924/25	1927/28	3	-	-	-	
Don Arnott	1954/55	1961/62	28	-	-	-	Father of Kevin Arnott.
Roy Ashburner	1947/48	1950/51	7	–	–	–	
Laurence Ashburnham	1909/10	1909/10	1	-	-	-	
Ken Austin	1927/28	1946/47	5	–	–	–	
Jack Bain	1922/23	1922/23	1	–	–	–	
Jeremy Baldwin	1949/50	1956/57	19	–	–	–	
Guy Barber	1956/57	1959/60	2	–	–	-	
Brian Barbour	1971/72	1978/79	37	1971/72	1978/79	8	
David Bawden	1975/76	1977/78	7	1974/75	1976/77	2	
Brian Baxter	1967/68	1967/68	1	-	-	-	
Tinker Beets	1960/61	1961/62	4	–	–	-	
Sandy Bell	1938/39	1938/39	1	–	–	-	
Martin Benkenstein	1970/71	1975/76	15	1972/73	1975/76	4	Father of Brett, Boyd and Dale Benkenstein.
Brian Bennett	1964/65	1967/68	4	–	–	-	
Robert Bentley	1978/79	1978/79	8	–	–	-	
Harry Birrell	1957/58	1959/60	7	–	–	-	Father of Adrian Birrell and uncle of Warne Rippon.
Charles Blanckenberg	1908/09	1908/09	1	–	–	-	
William Blanckenberg	1904/05	1904/05	1	–	–	-	
Colin Bland	1956/57	1968/69	57	–	–	-	
Nigel Boast	1930/31	1936/37	2	–	–	-	
Thomas Bourdillon	1909/10	1924/25	5	-	-	-	Brother of Victor and grandfather of Paul Bourdillon.
Terence Bowes	1971/72	1974/75	4	1971/72	1971/72	1	Also represented Rhodesia in rugby union.
Brendan Boyd	1975/76	1975/76	1	–	–	-	
Chin Bradley	1922/23	1924/25	3	-	-	-	
Frank Brooks	1909/10	1922/23	2	-	-	-	Brother of Freddie Brooks.
Freddie Brooks	1904/05	1909/10	2	–	–	-	Also played rugby union for England. Brother of Frank Brooks.
Lennox Brown	1946/47	1947/48	8	-	-	-	
Robin Brown	1976/77	1978/79	7	1977/78	1977/78	1	
James Buchanan	1945/46	1953/54	10	–	–	-	
Graham Bunyard	1962/63	1962/63	1	-	-	-	
Rikki Cameron	1968/69	1968/69	1	-	-	-	
Aidan Campbell	1924/25	1929/30	4	–	–	-	
Hamish Campbell-Rodger	1924/25	1931/32	8	–	–	-	
Allen Carew	1946/47	1950/51	12	–	–	-	Brother of Bernard Carew.
Bernard Carew	1948/49	1953/54	11	–	–	-	Brother of Allen Carew.
Peter Carlstein	1967/68	1978/79	43	1972/73	1977/78	9	
James Carse	1977/78	1978/79	6	1978/79	1978/79	1	
Bob Catterall	1924/25	1924/25	1	–	–	-	
Thomas Chapman	1952/53	1952/53	5	–	–	-	
Jack Charsley	1935/36	1945/46	6	–	–	-	
Jonathan Clarke	1966/67	1969/70	15	–	–	-	
Benjamin Chimowitz	1945/46	1945/46	1	–	–	-	
Paddy Clift	1971/72	1978/79	60	1972/73	1977/78	14	
Harry Coker	1909/10	1909/10	1	–	–	-	
Douglas Cornish	1946/47	1946/47	1	–	–	-	
Dalton Cornwall	1960/61	1960/61	1	–	–	-	
Ronald Coventry	1953/54	1957/58	17	–	–	-	
Austen Cowper	1922/23	1924/25	3	–	–	-	
Bob Crisp	1929/30	1930/31	2	–	–	–	
Arthur Curle	1922/23	1922/23	1	–	–	–	Brother of Gerald Curle,
Kevin Curran	1947/48	1954/55	6	–	–	–	Father of Kevin Curran, uncle of Patrick Curran and grandfather of Thomas Curran.
Patrick Curran	-	-	-	1976/77	1976/77	1	Nephew of Kevin Curran, Snr. and cousin of Kevin Curran.
Frank Davidson	1938/39	1938/39	2	–	–	-	Brother of Donald and Thomas Davidson.
Thomas Davidson	1938/39	1938/39	1	–	–	-	Brother of Donald and Frank Davidson.
Marshall Davies	1950/51	1956/57	20	–	–	-	
Brian Davison	1967/68	1978/79	90	1970/71	1978/79	21	
Tony de Caila	1961/62	1973/74	34	–	–	-	
Trefon Deftereos	1957/58	1960/61	4	–	–	-	
Hilary de Grandhomme	1946/47	1949/50	4	–	–	-	Uncle of Laurence de Grandhomme and great-uncle of Colin de Grandhomme.
Jimmy Dell	1952/53	1952/53	4	–	–	-	
Alexander Den	1935/36	1935/36	1	–	–	-	Father of Gordon Den, father-in-law of Rory Ervine and grandfather of Craig, Ryan and Sean Ervine.
Gordon Den	1963/64	1963/64	2	–	–	-	Son of Alexander Den, brother-in-law of Rory Ervine and uncle of Craig, Ryan and Sean Ervine.
Neville Deudney	1966/67	1966/67	3	–	–	-	
Ronald de Villiers	1961/62	1961/62	1	–	–	-	
Dicky Dickinson	1929/30	1929/30	4	–	–	-	Father of Vernon Dickinson.
Vernon Dickinson	1955/56	1964/65	20	–	–	-	Son of Dicky Dickinson.
Steve Dinsdale	1969/70	1969/70	1	–	–	–	
Edward Dollar	1927/28	1929/30	4	–	–	–	
Howard Downey	1947/48	1947/48	1	–	–	–	
Chris Duckworth	1954/55	1962/63	37	–	–	–	
Barry Dudleston	1976/77	1978/79	20	1976/77	1978/79	6	
Colin Duff	1904/05	1909/10	2	-	-	-	Also represented Rhodesia in rugby union. Brother of Benjamin Duff.
Thomas Dunk	1969/70	1978/79	13	-	-	-	
Jackie du Preez	1961/62	1978/79	110	1970/71	1978/79	18	
Norman Dyer	1946/47	1946/47	2	–	–	-	
Don Elliott	1922/23	1922/23	1	–	–	-	
Desmond Evans	1972/73	1973/74	4	1973/74	1973/74	1	
Harry Evans	1938/39	1945/46	4	–	–	-	
Allan Fletcher	1976/77	1976/77	4	–	–	-	Brother of Duncan Fletcher and Ann Grant.
Duncan Fletcher	1969/70	1978/69	78	1970/71	1977/78	18	Brother of Allan Fletcher and Ann Grant.
Gil Fletcher	1927/28	1927/28	1	–	–	-	
Howard Gardiner	1964/65	1975/76	54	1970/71	1975/76	11	
Peter Geach	1978/79	1978/79	2	–	–	-	
George Gemmell	1922/23	1924/25	2	–	–	-	
Scotty Gloak	1924/25	1924/25	1	–	–	-	
Jackie Grant	1931/32	1931/32	5	–	–	-	Brother of Frederick and Rolph Grant
Peter Green	1927/28	1927/28	1	–	–	-	
Geoff Griffin	1961/62	1962/63	7	–	–	-	
Ian Grimmer	1950/51	1950/51	1	–	–	-	
Ray Gripper	1957/58	1971/72	81	1970/71	1971/72	3	Father of Trevor Gripper.
Ian Haig	1960/61	1966/67	26	–	–	–	
Peter Halkett	1961/62	1961/62	1	–	–	-	
William Hancock	1904/05	1904/05	1	–	–	-	
Cecil Harris	1946/47	1954/55	32	–	–	-	Twin brother of Mervyn Harris.
Mervyn Harris	1949/50	1949/50	1	–	–	–	Twin brother of Cecil Harris.
Ronald Hayes	1946/47	1946/47	3	–	–	–	
Jack Hayward	1927/28	1938/39	16	–	–	–	
Roger Henderson	1961/62	1961/62	1	–	–	–	
Norman Henwood	1908/09	1908/09	1	–	–	–	Brother of Pelham Henwood.
Pelham Henwood	1909/10	1909/10	2	–	–	-	Brother of Norman Henwood.
Jack Heron	1968/69	1978/79	32	1973/74	1978/79	12	Father of Clint Heron.
Wally Hitzeroth	1954/55	1961/62	5	–	–	-	
Kenneth Hodnett	1976/77	1976/77	1	1976/77	1977/78	2	Brother of William Hodnett.
William Hodnett	1962/63	1962/63	1	–	–	-	Brother of Kenneth Hodnett.
Vince Hogg	1971/72	1978/79	20	1975/76	1977/78	6	
George Hopley	1922/23	1922/23	1	–	–	–	
Bernard Horton	1975/76	1977/78	16	1975/76	1978/79	7	
David Houghton	1978/79	1978/79	7	–	–	–	Brother of William Houghton.
Michael Huckle	1966/67	1966/67	1	–	–	–	Father of Adam Huckle.
Arnold Hyde	1927/28	1946/47	19	–	–	–	
Victor Hyde	1931/32	1931/32	2	–	–	–	
Vio Irvine	1936/37	1936/37	1	–	–	–	
Robin Jackman	1972/73	1976/77	33	1972/73	1975/76	9	
John Johnson	1945/46	1945/46	2	–	–	–	
Peter Johnson	1946/47	1952/53	14	–	–	-	
Robin Jones	1975/76	1975/76	3	–	–	-	
Cedric Jonker	1978/79	1978/79	3	–	–	-	
Richard Kaschula	1970/71	1977/78	31	1970/71	1977/78	6	Cousin of Nathaniel Kaschula.
Rodney Keast	1960/61	1963/64	3	–	–	-	
Herbert Keigwin	1909/10	1909/10	2	–	–	-	
Clive Kemp	1955/56	1922/23	6	–	–	-	
Robert Kennedy	1945/46	1945/46	1	–	–	–	
Michael Kettle	–	–	-	1974/75	1974/75	1	
Lloyd Koch	1958/59	1960/61	6	–	–	-	
Teddy Lang	1922/23	1922/23	1	–	–	-	
Errol Laughlin	1969/70	1970/71	10	–	–	-	
Godfrey Lawrence	1952/53	1965/66	66	–	–	-	Father of Stephen Lawrence.
Desmond Leather	1964/65	1964/65	1	–	–	-	
Michael Lee	1957/58	1957/58	5	–	–	-	
Walter Lee	1929/30	1929/30	1	–	–	-	
John Leibbrandt	1947/48	1951/52	16	–	–	-	
David Lewis	1945/46	1963/64	74	–	–	-	
Gerald Linnell	1904/05	1904/05	1	–	–	-	
Bruce McBride	1952/53	1954/55	7	–	–	-	Brother of Robert McBride.
Forbes McDonald	1946/47	1948/49	14	–	–	-	
Peter MacKenzie	1966/67	1967/68	2	–	–	-	
Roy McLoughlin	1966/67	1970/71	7	–	–	-	
John McPhun	1959/60	1971/72	32	1970/71	1971/72	3	Represented Rhodesia in field hockey at the 1964 Summer Olympics.
Russell MacTavish	1964/65	1964/65	1	–	–	-	
Dave McVey	–	–	-	1970/71	1970/71	2	
Mervyn Mansell	1936/37	1936/36	1	–	–	-	Brother of Percy Mansell.
Percy Mansell	1936/37	1959/60	56	–	–	-	Brother of Mervyn Mansell.
Tony Marillier	–	–	-	1975/76	1975/76	1	Father of Doug, Eian and Stephan Marillier.
Sidney Martin	1947/48	1949/50	9	–	–	-	Father of Hugh Martin and uncle of Arthur, Cyril and Hugh Tayfield.
Ronald Michell	1936/37	1936/37	1	–	–	-	
James Mitchell	1969/70	1978/79	47	1971/72	1978/79	12	
Hendrik Moll	1930/31	1936/37	7	–	–	-	
Howard Montgomery	1950/51	1950/51	1	–	–	-	
Frederick Morgan	1922/23	1929/30	6	–	–	-	
Dudley Morris	1936/37	1936/37	1	–	–	-	Brother of Edgar Morris.
Edgar Morris	1945/46	1945/46	1	–	–	-	Brother of Dudley Morris.
David Murray	1950/51	1950/51	2	–	–	-	
Henry Myles	1936/37	1936/37	1	–	–	-	
David Napier	1954/55	1966/67	18	–	–	-	Nephew of Mark Napier.
Mark Napier	1935/36	1947/48	10	–	–	-	Brother of William Napier and uncle of David Napier.
William Napier	1929/30	1931/32	2	–	–	–	Brother of Mark Napier.
Bob Newson	1945/46	1949/50	10	–	–	–	
Reginald Noble	1938/39	1946/47	10	–	-	-	
Denis O'Connell-Jones	1947/48	1957/58	14	–	-	-	
Peter Oldham	1949/50	1959/60	2	–	-	-	
Brian Oldrieve	1970/71	1970/71	6	1970/71	1970/71	2	
Ronald Oliver	1927/28	1927/28	1	–	–	-	
Sydney Olver	1946/47	1946/47	1	–	–	-	
Pat O'Reilly	1929/30	1930/31	5	–	–	-	
Edward Parker	1958/59	1969/70	38	-	–	-	
Wilfred Parry	1935/36	1935/36	1	–	–	-	
Joe Partridge	1951/52	1966/67	58	–	–	-	
Theo Passaportis	1946/47	1949/50	2	–	–	-	
Harold Paton	1954/55	1958/59	8	–	–	-	
Thomas Pattinson	1935/36	1935/36	1	–	-	-	
Arthur Pattison	1931/32	1931/32	5	–	–	-	
G Payne	1909/10	1909/10	1	–	–	-	
Noel Peck	1968/69	1968/69	3	–	–	-	
Gerald Peckover	1977/78	1978/79	11	1978/79	1978/79	1	
Peter Peiser	1922/23	1922/23	1	–	–	-	
Cecil Pfaff	1909/10	1909/10	1	–	–	-	
Tony Pithey	1950/51	1968/69	65	–	–	-	Brother of David Pithey.
David Pithey	1956/57	1965/66	25	–	–	-	Brother of Tony Pithey.
Connie Pretorius	1946/47	1952/53	15	–	–	-	
Mike Procter	1970/71	1975/76	46	1970/71	1975/76	12	Son of Woodrow Procter, brother of Anthony Procter and cousin of Andrew Procter.
Michael Quinn	1931/32	1931/32	5	–	–	-	Brother of Neville Quinn.
Philip Rabinson	1922/23	1922/23	2	–	–	-	
David Rees	1950/51	1952/53	16	–	–	-	
CP Richardson	1904/05	1904/05	1	–	–	-	
Russell Ridgway	1927/28	1927/28	1	–	–	–	
Lance Roberts	1929/30	1929/30	1	–	-	–	
Robert Robertson	1961/62	1961/62	2	–	–	–	Brother of Stuart Robertson.
Stuart Robertson	1968/69	1978/79	74	1970/71	1978/79	18	Brother of Robert Robertson.
Leo Robinson	1904/05	1909/10	3	–	–	–	Brother of Cyril Robinson and father of Victor Robinson.
Victor Robinson	1922/23	1931/32	7	–	–	–	
John Roothman	1950/51	1952/53	10	–	-	–	
Babe Saunders	1927/28	1927/28	1	–	–	-	
David Seagrave	1970/71	1971/72	5	-	-	-	
John Shepherd	1975/76	1975/76	3	1975/76	1975/76	1	
John Sierra	1950/51	1950/51	5	–	–	-	
Stewart Sim	1929/30	1929/30	5	-	-	-	
Sandy Singleton	1946/47	1949/50	9	-	-	-	
Michael Slaven	1953/54	1955/56	5	-	-	-	Brother of Francis Slaven.
Jock Speight	1927/28	1929/30	2	–	–	-	
GM Stephenson	1908/09	1908/09	1	–	–	-	
Denis Streak	1976/77	1978/79	8	1978/79	1978/79	1	Father of Heath Streak.
Charles Stuart	1904/05	1904/05	1	–	–	-	
Peter Swart	1965/66	1965/66	1	-	-	-	
Thomas Symington	1929/30	1930/31	6	–	–	-	
Walter Taberer	1904/05	1909/10	3	–	–	-	Brother of Henry Taberer.
Keith Tattersall	1973/74	1976/77	14	1973/74	1976/77	6	
Hugh Tayfield	1947/48	1948/49	7	-	-	-	Brother of Arthur and Cyril Tayfield, nephew of Sidney Martin and cousin of Hugh Martin.
Kenneth Teague	1949/50	1949/50	1	-	-	-	
Jock Thompson	1927/28	1935/36	10	-	-	-	
Bryan Thorn	1976/77	1977/78	6	-	-	-	
Denis Tomlinson	1927/28	1947/48	24	-	-	-	Brother of Raymond Tomlinson.
Raymond Tomlinson	1927/28	1929/30	3	-	-	-	Brother of Denis Tomlinson.
Kenneth Tonkin	1969/70	1969/70	2	-	-	-	
FH Townsend	1922/23	1922/23	1	-	-	-	
Derrick Townshend	1967/68	1968/69	5	-	-	-	Brother of Trevor Townshend.
Trevor Townshend	1976/77	1977/78	3	1976/77	1976/77	1	Brother of Derrick Townshend.
John Traicos	1967/68	1978/79	47	1973/74	1977/78	7	
Albert Tummell	1904/05	1904/05	1	-	-	-	
Robert Ullyett	1957/58	1967/68	47	–	–	–	Represented Rhodesia in field hockey at the 1964 Summer Olympics. Father of Kevin Ullyett.
Leigh Walkden	1946/47	1946/47	1	-	-	-	
Ross Walker	1946/47	1946/47	1	-	-	-	
John Wallace	1949/50	1954/55	19	-	-	-	Father of Peter Wallace.
John Wallace	1966/67	1966/67	2	–	–	-	
Peter Wallace	1977/78	1977/78	3	–	–	-	Son of John Wallace.
Derek Walters	1951/52	1951/52	1	-	-	-	
Arthur Ward	1936/37	1936/37	1	-	-	-	
Jackie Ward	1957/58	1957/58	2	-	-	-	
Huntsman Williams	1966/67	1969/70	8	-	-	-	
Neville Williams	1963/64	1967/68	7	-	-	-	
Jutty Willing	1929/30	1929/30	2	-	-	-	
Ronald Willson	1961/62	1961/62	3	-	-	-	
Paul Winslow	1956/57	1961/62	20	-	-	-	Son of Charles Winslow and grandson of Lyndhurst Winslow.
Brian Wishart	-	-	-	1974/75	1974/75	1	
Frederick Wood	1922/23	1922/23	1	-	-	-	Brother of William Wood.
William Wood	1924/25	1929/30	8	-	-	-	
Charles Wooler	1951/52	1956/57	8	-	-	-	
