= History of cricket in Zimbabwe to 1992 =

The history of cricket in Zimbabwe, formerly Rhodesia and before 1965 Southern Rhodesia, includes Rhodesia first forming a first-class cricket team in August 1890, and the inaugural Test appearance of Zimbabwe in October 1992.

Until 1965 Rhodesia encompassed Northern Rhodesia, now Zambia, but the cricket-playing population in that territory was very small.

== Historical background ==
The modern history of Zimbabwe starts with treaties and concessions initiated by Cecil Rhodes and the British South Africa Company in 1888/9. The country was the southern part of Zambezia until that name was officially changed to Rhodesia in 1895, and in 1898 the designation Southern Rhodesia was made official. Southern Rhodesia became a self-governing British colony in 1922.

In 1953 Northern and Southern Rhodesia were reunited in the Federation of Rhodesia and Nyasaland, and after its dissolution in 1963, an independence movement in Southern Rhodesia was led by Ian Smith. Southern Rhodesia was renamed Rhodesia in 1965, and a unilateral declaration of independence occurred. This was declared illegal by the UK, and 15 years of controversy and sanctions followed until finally the country gained official independence as Zimbabwe in April 1980.

== Cricket in Rhodesia ==
In cricket terms, Rhodesia was always tied to South Africa and for cricketing purposes were under the authority of that country's administrators until independence in 1980. The first recorded match in Rhodesia took place near Fort Victoria (modern Masvingo) on 16 August 1890, on a wicket of a bare twenty two yards of earth, shortly after Cecil Rhodes' Pioneer Column had formed a settlement. In the mid-1890s, the most important match of the Rhodesian domestic cricket season was Salisbury v Bulawayo. The Rhodesian Cricket Union was formed in 1898. The first English representative team, led by Lord Hawke, visited in 1898–99, with the match played on a matting wicket.

First-class cricket was not established in the colony until the Rhodesian team began taking part in South Africa's Currie Cup competition from 1904 to 1905 following the inclusion on 1 February 1904 of the Rhodesian Cricket Union (RCU) in the South African Cricket Association (SACA; itself founded in 1890). Rhodesia's inclusion within the South African cricketing structure had already been provided for since 1898 as the South African Cricket Association's own Articles of Constitution noted that the "area of the Association shall be divided into districts defined by the Government surveys, as the Association in general meeting may from time to time decide, and that the following be recognised as districts for Unions:- Western Province, Eastern Province, Border, Natal, (including Zululand), Transvaal (including Swaziland), Orange Free State (including Basutoland), Griqualand West, Bechuanaland (including Rhodesia)". These provisions meant that when the RCU applied to be affiliated with the SACA on 21 December 1903, it was unanimously approved.

The initial first-class match was against Transvaal cricket team on 15–16 March 1905, at Johannesburg. Rhodesia lost by an innings and 170 runs. After this brief appearance, Rhodesia did not take part in the Currie Cup again until 1929–30. They played also in 1931–32, winning four out of five matches, but losing the cup to Western Province under the points system then in use. The Rhodesian team then did not return until 1946–47, after which they at last played regularly. The Rhodesian team toured other areas of Africa too. In 1951 they toured their northern neighbours East Africa. The first overseas team to play there. In this period, Denis Tomlinson became Rhodesia's first Test cricketer when he was selected to tour England with the South Africa national cricket team in 1935, Chris Duckworth the second for the English tour of 1955, and Tony Pithey the third against England in the home series of 1956/57.

The Logan Cup, a weekend contest between the four provinces, Matabaleland, Mashonaland, Manicaland and Midlands was played on an annual basis, later incorporating Northern Rhodesia, while in the winter months, with the farmers in fallow, Sunday Country Districts' Cricket abounded. Additionally in the late 1950s and early 1960s, in those winter months, the Stragglers, made up of a number of Mashonaland players, travelled to Blantyre for weekend matches on matting wickets against Nyasaland. In the 1961 game, Chris Duckworth scored 91 in 58 minutes.

David Lewis was the captain of the Rhodesian team for 10 years, from 1953–54 to 1963–64, and the team included players such as Colin Bland, Chris Duckworth, Godfrey Lawrence, Percy Mansell, Joe Partridge, Tony and David Pithey, Lloyd Koch and Paul Winslow.

Although the RCU became eligible for Associate membership of the ICC after 1965, when the ICC opened up associate membership more broadly (including to non-Commonwealth countries like the USA) it did not seriously consider applying as it valued its relationship with SACA more than an independent relationship with the ICC.

By the 1970s, the team was captained by Mike Procter and included players such as John Traicos, Duncan Fletcher, and Robin Jackman. However, despite this wealth of talent Rhodesia never won the Currie Cup. In all, 242 players represented Rhodesia in first-class and List A cricket.

The team played in 1979–80 as "Zimbabwe-Rhodesia", and left the competition for good at the close of that season after Zimbabwe officially became independent.

== Cricket in Zimbabwe ==
The only first-class matches in the 1980–81 and 1981–82 seasons involved the Zimbabwean national cricket team against tourists. Zimbabwe became an associate member of the International Cricket Council on 21 July 1981, and played first-class matches on its inaugural tour of England in 1982. Zimbabwe won the 1982 ICC Trophy, and this can be seen as its first step towards Test status. The team competed in the 1983 Cricket World Cup, unexpectedly beating Australia in its first match. Later, the team was weakened when white Zimbabweans, including Graeme Hick, left the country to pursue their careers elsewhere.

Zimbabwe's application for Test status and full membership of the ICC was again rejected at the ICC's July 1989 meeting due to a veto by England, although it was agreed that in the future Zimbabwe could play five-day unofficial Tests against representative teams from Test-playing countries, while serving a five-year probationary period before their bid for full membership would be reconsidered in 1994.

Zimbabwe was elected to full membership of the ICC in July 1992, with all full members voting in favour except for England who abstained, and played its inaugural Test match versus India at the Harare Sports Club on 18–22 October 1992, under the captaincy of David Houghton. The match was drawn, and thus Zimbabwe became the first team to avoid losing its inaugural Test match since Australia beat England in the very first Test in 1877.

The main domestic competition is the Logan Cup which has a long history. This acquired first-class status from the 1993–94 season.

Zimbabwe cricket has also nurtured and produced South African born Andy Flower, whose test batting average was over 80 in both 2000 and 2001 and who ranks as one of the finest wicket-keeper batsmen in the history of the game.

== International tours of Rhodesia and Zimbabwe to 1992 ==
English XI 1924

A team of English cricketers financed by businessman Solomon Joel (hence known as S. B. Joel's XI) toured South Africa in 1924/25. One match was played against Rhodesia in Bulawayo which was won by S. B. Joel's XI by 8 wickets.

New Zealand 1953

The touring New Zealand team played one match against Rhodesia at the start of their 1953/54 tour of South Africa. The three-day match at Bulawayo was drawn.

Australia 1957

Prior to the commencement of their 1957/58 tour of South Africa the Australian cricket team played three matches in Rhodesia. A 2-day match with North Rhodesia in Kitwe was drawn, a 4-day match against Rhodesia in Sailsbury was won Australia by an innings and 14 runs and a 3-day match versus Rhodesia in Bulawayo was a 10 wicket victory to Australia.

New Zealand 1961

Rhodesia was visited by a New Zealand team at the start of their tour of South Africa in October 1961. They played two three-day first-class games against Rhodesia, the first in Bulawayo and the second in Salisbury. Both matches ended in draws.

Commonwealth XI 1961/62

This was the first tour by an international team of southern Africa that was confined to Rhodesia. The Commonwealth XI cricket team visited the country in February–March 1962 and played matches in Kitwe, Bulawayo and Salisbury. The first two matches were drawn, while the third match in Salisbury was a 74 run victory for the Rhodesian team.

International Cavaliers 1962/63

An International Cavaliers cricket team toured Rhodesia in the 1962–63 season, playing a first-class match against the team representative of Rhodesia, in Salisbury. Captained by Willie Watson, the Commonwealth XI included several famous or well-known players such as Basil D'Oliveira, Rohan Kanhai, Roy Swetman, Chandu Borde, Roy Marshall, Bill Alley, Trevor Goddard and Peter Loader. The three day match was drawn.

International Wanderers 1970s

An International Wanderers team, made up of international players from multiple countries, toured Rhodesia in 1972. They played two 4-day matches against Rhodesia. The first game was drawn and the second game was a 411 run victory to Rhodesia. The International Wanderers toured Rhodesia and Transvaal in 1974. They played three 50-over matches and one 3-day match against Rhodesia. The International Wanderers won all four matches. In 1975 the International Wanderers visited again playing one 50-over match and two 3-day matches. The 50-over match in Salisbury was won by Rhodesia by 12 runs. The first 3-day match in Bulawayo was won by Rhodesia by 4 runs. The second 3-day match in Sailsbury was won by the International Wanderers by 9 wickets.

Kenya 1980–81

The Kenyan cricket team toured Zimbabwe in 1980/81 and played six matches. The two 3-day matches against the full Zimbabwean team were victories for Zimbabwe, winning the first match in Salisbury by 10 wickets and the second in Bulawayo by an innings and 103 runs.

Sri Lanka 1982/83

Sri Lanka, after recently being awarded Test status, toured Zimbabwe in 1982. They drew a two-match limited overs series 1-1. There were then two 4-day matches, one being drawn and the other a victory to Zimbabwe by an innings and 40 runs. The tour was later overshadowed by several Sri Lankan players leaving to join a "rebel tour" to nearby South Africa, the Arosa Sri Lanka team.

Ireland 1985/86

A touring team from Ireland visited Zimbabwe in 1986 and played 8 matches against local teams, but no matches against the Zimbabwe national side.

Ireland 1990/91

Ireland made another visit in March 1991 and played nine matches on their tour. One was a 9-day match against a Zimbabwe XI in Harare which was drawn.
