= Bourdillon =

Bourdillon or Bourdillón is a surname. Notable people with the surname include:

- Alberto Bourdillón (1943–2026), Argentine swimmer
- Bernard Henry Bourdillon (1883–1948), British colonial governor
- Francis William Bourdillon (1852–1921), British poet and translator
- Frédéric Bourdillon (born 1991), French-Israeli basketball player
- James Bourdillon (1811–1883), British colonial administrator in Madras
- Paul Bourdillon (born 1964), Zimbabwean cricketer
- Robert Benedict Bourdillon (1889–1971), British pilot and scientist
- T. F. Bourdillon (1849–1930), British naturalist working in India
- Thomas Bourdillon (1890–1961), Orange Free State-born Rhodesian cricketer
- Tom Bourdillon (1924–1956), British mountaineer
- Victor Bourdillon (1897–1985), South African-born Rhodesian cricketer
