= Tayfield =

Tayfield is a surname. Notable people with the surname include:

- Arthur Tayfield (1931–2022), South African cricketer
- Hugh Tayfield (1929–1994), South African cricketer
