= Sidney Martin (cricketer) =

South African cricketer

Personal information
- Full name: Sidney Hugh Martin
- Born: 11 January 1909; Durban, South Africa
- Died: 13 February 1988 (aged 79); Frankston, Melbourne, Victoria, Australia
- Batting: Right-handed
- Bowling: Right-arm medium

Domestic team information
- Years: Team
- 1925/26–1946/47: Natal
- 1929–1930: MCC
- 1931–1939: Worcestershire
- 1947/48–1949/50: Rhodesia

Career statistics
Competition	First-class
Matches	267
Runs scored	11,511
Batting average	27.02
100s/50s	13/68
Top score	191*
Balls bowled	36,939
Wickets	532
Bowling average	28.31
5 wickets in innings	21
10 wickets in match	6
Best bowling	8/24
Catches/stumpings	159/–
- Source: CricInfo, 18 February 2018

Sidney Hugh Martin (11 January 1909 – 13 February 1988) was a South African first-class cricketer who played 267 first-class games in both South African and English cricket. He was the uncle of South Africa Test cricketer Hugh Tayfield.

Martin made his first-class debut in the Currie Cup for Natal against Eastern Province in March 1926, taking two second-innings wickets including that of Arthur Ochse. He played two more games (both also against Natal) the following season, taking six wickets in the first match and scoring 64 not out in the first innings of the second game.

In 1929 Martin made his debut in England, playing for MCC against Oxford University at Lord's, and although he returned to Natal during the English winters, he played no further cricket outside England until after the Second World War. He appeared quite regularly for MCC in 1929 and 1930; his best bowling return for them was the 7/43 he claimed in the first innings against the Royal Navy at Chatham in July 1929, while his highest score was the 97 he made against the Army in August 1930.

In 1931 Martin made a rather low-key Worcestershire debut, taking two wickets and scoring 4 against the New Zealanders. He began his County Championship career the following season, and remained a stalwart of the side until the outbreak of war. He just failed to score his thousand first-class runs for the season in 1932, but reached the landmark every year from 1933 to 1939, while in both 1937 and 1939 he achieved the double.

His most productive year with the bat was 1935, in which he hit five centuries, including his career best, a first-innings 191* versus Northamptonshire. As a bowler, he three times took eight wickets in an innings, the best of these returns (and the best of his career) being the 8/24 he claimed against Sussex in August 1939, with match figures of 13/88.

The war then intervened, and indeed he never played first-class cricket in England again. His next appearance was back with Natal, playing against Transvaal in a match starting on Boxing Day 1945. He played a full Currie Cup campaign with Natal in 1946/47, and in November 1946 took 5/32 against Griqualand West. From 1947/48 until the end of his career in 1949/50, Martin represented Rhodesia, now having moved to live there. For them, his best performance was the 6/49 he took against a touring MCC side at Salisbury in February 1949. He captained the Rhodesia team on four occasions.

Although he never acted as an umpire in a first-class match, he did stand (with Paul Gibb) in Worcestershire's centenary single-innings game against MCC in 1965.

Other than his nephew Hugh Tayfield (mentioned above) three of Martin's other relatives played first-class cricket: his son Hugh Martin, and two other nephews Arthur Tayfield and Cyril Tayfield.

Sporting positions
Preceded by Charlie Hallows	Worcestershire cricket coach 1965–1967	Succeeded by Henry Horton
