= Russell Ridgway =

English cricketer

Personal information
- Full name: Charles Russell Ridgway
- Born: 30 January 1891; Hanley, Staffordshire, England
- Died: 26 October 1946 (aged 55); Bulawayo, Southern Rhodesia
- Batting: Left-handed

Domestic team information
- Years: Team
- 1927/28: Rhodesia
- 1913–1922: Staffordshire

Career statistics
Competition	First-class
Matches	1
Runs scored	5
Batting average	2.50
100s/50s	–/–
Top score	5
Balls bowled	–
Wickets	–
Bowling average	–
5 wickets in innings	–
10 wickets in match	–
Best bowling	–
Catches/stumpings	–/–
- Source: Cricinfo, 1 December 2013

Charles Russell Ridgway (30 January 1891 – 26 October 1946) was an English-born Rhodesian businessman. He was an English cricketer active in the 1910s and 1920s, making a single appearance in first-class cricket. Born at Hanley, Staffordshire, Ridgway was a left-handed batsman who played most of his cricket at minor counties level with Staffordshire.

== Career ==
Ridgway made his debut in minor counties cricket for Staffordshire against the Surrey Second XI in the 1913 Minor Counties Championship, in what was his only appearance for the county before the First World War. He resumed playing for the county after the war and made a further ten appearances in the Minor Counties Championship, the last of which came against Norfolk in 1923. Later emigrating to Southern Rhodesia, Ridgway made a single first-class appearance as captain for Rhodesia against Transvaal in 1928 at the Raylton Club, Bulawayo. In a match which Transvaal won by 3 wickets, Ridgway was dismissed for duck by Stanley Brissenden in Rhodesia's first-innings, while in their second-innings he was dismissed for 5 runs by Jim Christy.

He died at Bulawayo, Southern Rhodesia on 26 October 1946.
