= Victor Robinson =

Victor Robinson may refer to:

- Victor Robinson (physician) (1886–1947), Ukrainian-American physician
- Victor Robinson (lawyer) (1899–1966), Southern Rhodesian lawyer
