= Don Arnott =

Zimbabwean cricketer (1936–2019)

Personal information
- Full name: Donald Brian Arnott
- Born: 3 March 1936; Bulawayo, Southern Rhodesia
- Died: 11 April 2019 (aged 83); Harare, Zimbabwe
- Relatives: Kevin Arnott (son)
- Source: Cricinfo, 27 December 2019

Don Arnott (3 March 1936 – 11 April 2019) was a Zimbabwean cricketer who played in twenty-eight first-class matches for Rhodesia between 1954 and 1962. His son, Kevin, played international cricket for Zimbabwe.

== See also ==
- List of Rhodesian representative cricketers
