= Richard Norden =

Richard Norden may refer to:

- Richard Norden (cricketer) (1879–1952), South African cricketer
- Richard Norden (soldier) (1948–1972), Australian soldier and Victoria Cross recipient
