= Chaplin High School =

School in Gweru, Zimbabwe

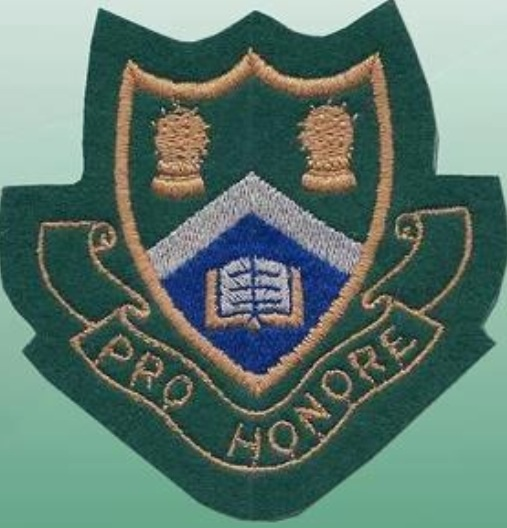
- Chaplin High School school crest

Location
- Gweru; Zimbabwe; 19.4592589°S 29.8181253°E

Information
- Other name: Yard
- Former name: Trinity Church School
- Type: High School, Boarding School, Day School, A School
- Motto: Pro Honore (Do it with honour)
- Established: October 1900
- School district: Gweru
- Authority: Government of Zimbabwe - Ministry of Primary and Secondary Education
- Head teacher: Mr H Mavuka
- Gender: Male and Female
- Age range: 12-19
- Language: English
- Colors: Khakhi and Green

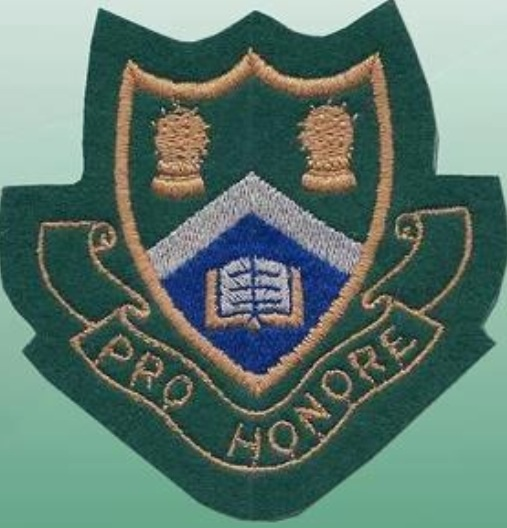
Chaplin High School Logo

Chaplin High School is situated in Gweru, Zimbabwe, and was started in October 1902. It was started in a building of the Trinity Church, Gwelo and first named as the Trinity Church School (1). The school caters for boys and girls from form 1–6 and has boarders and day scholars. There are two boarding houses for boys named Duthie House and Coghlan House while girls are housed in either Lenfesty House or Maitland House. Maitland House is the sister hostel for Duthie while Lenfesty is the sister house for Coghlan House.

== History ==
Seven children reported for school in October 1900 when the school was first started. At that time, it was called the Trinity Church School as the building was in the Trinity Church of Gwelo. The first headmaster was Mr Watkinson while Miss Coates-Palgrave was the Assistant to the headmaster. The following January, 16 children moved to the current school grounds.

In 1909, Mr A McDonald was appointed as the headmaster of the school which had been renamed the Gwelo Public School. He continued as the headmaster of the school until 1927 when he retired.

In 1911, the government built a schoolhouse which was the first school hostel in the country. This schoolhouse was later renamed Duthie House after being opened by Mr George Duthie FRSE. Also 1911 saw Chaplin playing rugby against other schools for the first time. They lost to both Plumtree High School and Milton High School but were later to improve greatly providing players for both Rhodesia and Zimbabwe.

In 1914, the first school magazine was printed. In 1923, the first girls hostel Maitland House was opened by Sir Drummond Chaplin and the school was renamed Chaplin. In 1928, Coghlan House was opened with Lenfesty being opened in 1950. In 1937, the seniors and the juniors were separated, which was the start of Cecil John Rhodes Primary School. On 7 July 1953, The Queens Gate was opened by Queen Elizabeth The Queen Mother.

== Notable alumni ==
- Alec Smith
- Ian Smith, Prime Minister of Rhodesia from 1964 to 1979, was a student at Chaplin from 1933 to 1937 (Duthie) and head boy in 1937. He was the captain for rugby, cricket, athletics, tennis and boxing.
- Chris Duckworth, cricketer
- Steve Elworthy, cricketer
- Richard Kaschula, cricketer
- Robert Ullyett, cricketer
- Michael Holman, journalist and author

== Bibliography ==
1. https://web.archive.org/web/20130610105620/http://chaplin1930-1980.magix.net/website#HISTORY CONT 3
2. http://rhodesianheritage.blogspot.co.uk/2012/03/royal-tour-of-southern-rhodesia-1953.html
