= William Haughton =

William Haughton may refer to:

- William Haughton (playwright) (died 1605), English playwright
- Billy Haughton (1923–1986), American harness driver and trainer
- Bill Haughton (1923–2003), Irish field hockey player and cricketer

== See also ==
- William Houghton (disambiguation)
- Billy Houghton (born 1939), English footballer
