= Hamish Campbell-Rodger =

Rhodesian cricketer

Personal information
- Full name: James Cullan Campbell-Rodger
- Born: 25 June 1907; Bulawayo, Rhodesia
- Died: 20 May 1968 (aged 60); Marandellas, Rhodesia
- Batting: Right-handed
- Bowling: Right-arm medium-pace

Domestic team information
- Years: Team
- 1924–25 to 1932–33: Rhodesia

Career statistics
Competition	First-class
Matches	15
Runs scored	723
Batting average	26.77
100s/50s	2/2
Top score	108
Balls bowled
Wickets	17
Bowling average	32.76
5 wickets in innings	0
10 wickets in match	0
Best bowling	3/41
Catches/stumpings	7/–
- Source: Cricinfo, 26 February 2020

James Cullan "Hamish" Campbell-Rodger (25 June 1907 – 20 May 1968) was a cricketer who played first-class cricket for Rhodesia from 1924 to 1932.

Hamish Campbell-Rodger was born in Bulawayo and educated at Plumtree School, where he was head of school in 1925. His outstanding cricket season was 1931–32, when he captained Rhodesia to second place in the Currie Cup. He was their leading batsman with 385 runs at an average of 48.12, and took 10 wickets at 18.30. He scored his two first-class centuries that season: against Transvaal and Eastern Province. Rhodesia had never won a first-class match before the season, but went on to win four of their five matches, more than any other team in the competition, which they failed to win by only one point.
