= Frank Brooks (sportsman) =

Southern Rhodesian sportsman (1884-1952)

Personal information
- Full name: Frank Bertram Brooks
- Born: 10 September 1884; Bombay, Bombay Presidency, British India
- Died: 19 August 1952 (aged 67); Salisbury, Southern Rhodesia
- Batting: Right-handed
- Bowling: Right-arm medium

Domestic team information
- Years: Team
- 1909/10–1922/23: Rhodesia

Career statistics
Competition	First-class
Matches	2
Runs scored	43
Batting average	14.33
100s/50s	0/0
Top score	28
Balls bowled	54
Wickets	0
Bowling average	–
5 wickets in innings	–
10 wickets in match	–
Best bowling	–
Catches/stumpings	0/–
- Source: CricketArchive, 21 April 2023

Frank Bertram Brooks (10 September 1884 – 19 August 1952) was a Southern Rhodesian sportsman who represented his country as a cricketer, a rugby union player and as a tennis player.

== Biography ==
Born in Bombay, Bombay Presidency, British India, on 10 September 1884, Frank Brooks was educated at Bedford School. He was a member of one of Southern Rhodesia's greatest sporting families, and the younger brother of Freddie Brooks OBE. He represented Southern Rhodesia in cricket, between 1909 and 1922, in rugby union and in tennis, and was Rhodesian men's doubles champion for twenty-one years, between 1910 and 1931.

Frank Brooks died in Salisbury, Southern Rhodesia, on 19 August 1952, aged 67.
