= Wilfred Parry =

South African cricketer and British Army soldier

Personal information
- Full name: Wilfred John Parry
- Born: 17 August 1910; Durban, Natal, South Africa
- Died: 23 July 1942 (aged 31); Ruweisat Ridge, Kingdom of Egypt
- Batting: Right-handed

Domestic team information
- Years: Team
- 1930/31: Natal
- 1935/36: Rhodesia

Career statistics
Competition	First-class
Matches	3
Runs scored	93
Batting average	23.25
100s/50s	–/–
Top score	47
Catches/stumpings	–/–
- Source: Cricinfo, 12 June 2022

Wilfred John Parry (17 August 1910 – 23 July 1942) was a South African first-class cricketer and British Army soldier.

The son of Llewellyn and Edith Parry, he was born at Durban in August 1910. Parry made his debut in first-class cricket for Natal against the touring Marylebone Cricket Club at Durban in November 1930. His second first-class appearance came for Natal against the same opposition a little under two months later at Pietermaritzburg. Five years later in 1936, Parry made a third and final appearance in first-class cricket for Rhodesia against the touring Australian team at Bulawayo. He scored 93 runs at an average of 23.25, with his highest score of 47 coming against the touring Australians.

Parry served in the British Army during the Second World War as a corporal in the 1st Battalion, King's Royal Rifle Corps. The 1st Battalion saw action in the North African campaign, as part of the 7th Armoured Division. Parry took part in the Battle of Sidi Rezegh in November 1941, while in July 1942 he took part in the First Battle of El Alamein. It was during this battle that Parry was killed in action on 23 July. He is commemorated at the El Alamein War Cemetery.
