= Mike Huckle =

Personal information
- Full name: Michael Raymond George Huckle
- Born: 6 August 1938 (age 88); Bulawayo, Southern Rhodesia
- Batting: Right-handed
- Bowling: Slow left-arm orthodox
- Relatives: Adam Huckle (son)

Domestic team information
- Years: Team
- 1966: Rhodesia

Career statistics
Competition	First-class
Matches	1
Runs scored	18
Batting average	18.00
100s/50s	0/0
Top score	14*
Balls bowled	54
Wickets	1
Bowling average	44.00
5 wickets in innings	0
10 wickets in match	0
Best bowling	1/44
Catches/stumpings	0/–
- Source: CricketArchive, 7 February 2015

Michael Raymond George Huckle (born 6 August 1938) is a Rhodesian former cricketer who played a single first-class match for the Rhodesian national side in October 1966.

Born in Bulawayo, Huckle was a left-arm orthodox spinner and a right-handed lower-order batsman. His only first-class appearance came against Transvaal during the 1966–67 Currie Cup, in a three-day match at the Police A Ground in Salisbury (now Harare). In Rhodesia's first innings, Huckle came in eighth in the batting order, scoring 14 not out. Bowling in Transvaal's first innings, he had Ali Bacher, Transvaal's captain and a future captain of the South African national side, caught by Raymond Gripper for 54. He finished with 1/44 from nine overs, and played little further part in the match as Rhodesia lost by 10 wickets.

Huckle had been selected for Rhodesia on the basis of good form for Matabeleland in the Logan Cup. However, competition from two other spinners, Dave Napier and Neville Deudney, meant he played only a single game for the national side. Huckle later took up farming at Turk Mine, in present-day Matabeleland North Province of Zimbabwe. He stood as a Rhodesia Party candidate at the 1974 general election, but lost to the Rhodesian Front's Reginald Cowper in the Wankie constituency, getting only 13.9 percent of the vote. Huckle's son, Adam George Huckle, was raised in Turk Mine, and went on to play Test cricket for Zimbabwe in the 1990s. Mike Huckle remained involved in local cricket, and in March 1991, aged 53, played a game for Matabeleland Country Districts against Ireland. One of his teammates in that match was Denis Streak, another ex-Rhodesian player farming at Turk Mine whose son, Heath Streak, played Tests for Zimbabwe.
