= Sydney Martin =

Sydney or Sidney Martin may refer to:

- Sidney Martin (cricketer) (1909–1988), South African cricketer
- Sidney Martin (physician) (1860–1924), British physician
- Sidney Martin House, historic house in Louisiana
- Sydney Martin (actress) (born 2001), English actress
- Sydney Martin (footballer), South African footballer
