= Jono Clarke =

Rhodesian cricketer (1944–2020)

Personal information
- Full name: Jonathan Kirkwood Clarke
- Born: 24 May 1944; Gwelo, Rhodesia
- Died: 2 June 2020 (aged 76); Perth, Australia
- Batting: Right-handed
- Role: Batsman

Domestic team information
- Years: Team
- 1967/68 - 1969/70: Rhodesia

Career statistics
Competition	First-class
Matches	15
Runs scored	719
Batting average	26.62
100s/50s	2/2
Top score	130
Balls bowled	-
Wickets	-
Bowling average	-
5 wickets in innings	-
10 wickets in match	-
Best bowling	-
Catches/stumpings	14/–
- Source: Cricinfo, 15 April 2021

Jono Clarke (24 May 1944 – 2 June 2020) was a Rhodesian cricketer. He played in fifteen first-class matches from 1967/68 to 1969/70. Clarke was the first batsman to score a century on his first-class debut for the Rhodesia cricket team.

== See also ==
- List of Rhodesian representative cricketers
