= Huntsman Williams =

Rhodesian cricketer

Personal information
- Full name: Benjamin Huntsman Williams
- Born: 10 June 1944; Bulawayo, Southern Rhodesia
- Died: 3 August 1978 (aged 34) near Turk Mine, Matabeleland, Rhodesia
- Batting: Left-handed
- Bowling: Left-arm fast-medium
- Role: Bowler

Domestic team information
- Years: Team
- 1963/64: Orange Free State
- 1966/67–1969/70: Rhodesia

Career statistics
Competition	First-class
Matches	9
Runs scored	143
Batting average	9.53
100s/50s	0/0
Top score	30
Balls bowled	948
Wickets	14
Bowling average	36.14
5 wickets in innings	0
10 wickets in match	0
Best bowling	4/56
Catches/stumpings	4/–
- Source: CricketArchive, 15 November 2022

Benjamin Huntsman Williams (10 June 1944 – 3 August 1978) was a Rhodesian first-class cricketer.

Williams, a left-arm fast-medium bowler, was a good enough player in his youth to have represented Rhodesian Nuffield, South African Schools and Rhodesia Country Districts by his 18th birthday.

He made his first-class debut in the 1963/64 Currie Cup season, playing for Orange Free State against North Eastern Transvaal. Despite opening the bowling in each innings, he failed to take a wicket.

In 1966 he appeared for Matabeleland against the touring Australian team, in a non first-class fixture. He took four first innings wickets, Bob Simpson, Bob Cowper, Ian Redpath and Keith Stackpole. This earned him a call up to the Rhodesian team to take on the same opponent and he made two further first-class appearances in the 1966/67 Currie Cup competition. He didn't play again for Rhodesia until the 1969/70 Currie Cup, when he took part in four matches.

When not playing cricket, Williams worked as a farmer, in Inyati. On 3 August 1978, while on duty as a police reserve, he was fatally wounded in the arm by a rocket-propelled grenade fired at his vehicle by Bush War guerrillas during an ambush. He died of wounds later that day.
