= Adam Huckle =

Zimbabwean cricketer (born 1971)

Personal information
- Full name: Adam George Huckle
- Born: 21 September 1971 (age 55); Bulawayo, Rhodesia
- Batting: Right-handed
- Bowling: Legbreak googly
- Role: Bowler
- Relatives: Mike Huckle (father)

International information
- National side: Zimbabwe
- Test debut (cap 35): 18 September 1997 v New Zealand
- Last Test: 10 December 1998 v Pakistan
- ODI debut (cap 51): 11 October 1997 v Bangladesh
- Last ODI: 11 June 1999 v Pakistan

Domestic team information
- Years: Team
- 1992–1996: Eastern Province
- 1997–1999: Matabeleland

Career statistics
| Competition | Test | ODI | FC | LA |
|---|---|---|---|---|
| Matches | 8 | 19 | 49 | 31 |
| Runs scored | 74 | 9 | 352 | 22 |
| Batting average | 6.72 | 2.25 | 8.80 | 3.66 |
| 100s/50s | 0/0 | 0/0 | 0/0 | 0/0 |
| Top score | 28* | 5* | 41 | 5* |
| Balls bowled | 1,568 | 858 | 9,182 | 1,367 |
| Wickets | 25 | 7 | 119 | 22 |
| Bowling average | 34.88 | 94.42 | 42.39 | 45.72 |
| 5 wickets in innings | 2 | 0 | 4 | 0 |
| 10 wickets in match | 1 | 0 | 2 | 0 |
| Best bowling | 6/109 | 2/27 | 6/59 | 4/38 |
| Catches/stumpings | 3/– | 7/– | 16/– | 9/– |
- Source: CricketArchive, 27 October 2013

Adam George Huckle (born 21 September 1971) is a Zimbabwean former international cricketer who played in eight Test matches and 19 One Day Internationals (ODI) from 1997 to 1999 for the Zimbabwe national team.

In his second Test in 1997, against New Zealand, Huckle took 11–255 in the match (6–109 and 5–146). As of December 2023, this remains the only occasion of a Zimbabwean bowler taking 11 wickets in a Test match. His aggressive appealing in the match led to a fine by referee Sidath Wettimuny for attempting to intimidate the umpire. He was filmed shepherding a dismissed batsman off the field with a well known two-word goodbye. When questioned by the relevant cricketing body at a subsequent hearing, Huckle explained: "Well, we weren't playing netball".

Huckle's father, Mike Huckle, played a single first-class match for Rhodesia in the 1960s.
