= Henry Myles (cricketer) =

South African cricketer and British Army soldier

Personal information
- Full name: Henry Filby Myles
- Born: 6 June 1911; Cape Town, Cape Province, South Africa
- Died: 15 June 1942 (aged 31); Kirkinner, Wigtownshire, Scotland
- Batting: Right-handed

Domestic team information
- Years: Team
- 1930/31: Western Province
- 1936/37: Rhodesia

Career statistics
Competition	First-class
Matches	3
Runs scored	66
Batting average	11.00
100s/50s	–/–
Top score	35
Catches/stumpings	–/–
- Source: Cricinfo, 12 June 2022

Henry Filby Myles (6 June 1911 – 15 June 1942) was a South African first-class cricketer and Royal Air Force Volunteer Reserve officer.

The son of Henry and Rebecca Myles, he was born at Cape Town in June 1911. Myles made his debut in first-class cricket for Western Province against the touring Marylebone Cricket Club (MCC) at Cape Town in November 1930. His second first-class appearance came for Western Province came the following month against Griqualand West. Six years later in 1936, Myles made a third and final appearance in first-class cricket for Rhodesia against Transvaal at Johannesburg. He scored 66 runs at an average of 11.00 in his three first-class matches, with his highest score of 35 coming against the touring MCC.

Myles served in the Royal Air Force Volunteer Reserve during the Second World War as a pilot officer. While undergoing training as a Bristol Blenheim pilot as part of No. 1 (Observers) Advanced Flying Unit based at RAF Wigtown, Myles along with his crew were killed on 15 June 1942 when the bomber he was piloting crashed shortly after take-off following engine failure. Myles was subsequently buried at Kirkinner Cemetery.
