= Thomas Bourdillon =

Rhodesia international cricketer

Personal information
- Full name: Thomas Edmund Bourdillon
- Born: 31 May 1890; Bloemfontein, Orange Free State, South Africa
- Died: 27 May 1961 (aged 70); Salisbury, Rhodesia
- Batting: Right-handed
- Bowling: Right-arm fast-medium
- Relatives: Victor Bourdillon (brother); Paul Bourdillon (grandson)

Domestic team information
- Years: Team
- 1919: Sussex
- 1909/10–1924/25: Rhodesia

Career statistics
Competition	First-class
Matches	7
Runs scored	176
Batting average	13.53
100s/50s	–/1
Top score	60
Balls bowled	301
Wickets	3
Bowling average	57.66
5 wickets in innings	–
10 wickets in match	–
Best bowling	2/51
Catches/stumpings	4/–
- Source: Cricinfo, 12 February 2012

Thomas Edmund Bourdillon (31 May 1890 – 27 May 1961) was an Orange Free State born Rhodesian cricketer. Bourdillon was a right-handed batsman who bowled right-arm fast-medium. He was born at Bloemfontein, Orange Free State, and was educated at Tonbridge School in England.

Bourdillon made his first-class debut for Rhodesia against HDG Leveson-Gower's XI, making two appearances against the touring team in 1910. A little over three years later, he made his next first-class appearance for PW Sherwell's XI against Transvaal, during which he scored his only first-class fifty with a score of 60. He later made a single first-class appearance for English county side Sussex in the 1919 County Championship against Somerset, scoring 28 runs in the match. Three further first-class appearances came later for Rhodesia, twice against Transvaal in 1923 and once against SB Joel's XI in 1924. In five first-class matches for Rhodesia, Bourdillon scored 78 runs at an average of 8.66, with a high score of 24. With the ball, he took 3 wickets at a bowling average of 57.66, with best figures of 2/51.

He died at Salisbury, Rhodesia on 27 May 1961. His brother, Victor, played first-class cricket, as did his grandson Paul Bourdillon.
