= Arthur Curle =

English cricketer (1895–1966)

Arthur Charles Curle (27 July 1895 – 2 February 1966) was an English first-class cricketer who played in three matches for Warwickshire in 1920 and a single game for Rhodesia in 1922–23. He was born at Milverton, Leamington Spa, Warwickshire and died at Aylesbury, Buckinghamshire.

Educated at King Edward's School, Birmingham, Curle was the third of four brothers who all played cricket to a good standard, his older brother Gerald Curle appearing for Warwickshire in 1913. He was a dashing left-handed middle-order batsman and a left-arm orthodox spin bowler for Leamington Cricket Club, and appeared in three Warwickshire matches in the middle of the 1920 season, scoring 40 in his first first-class innings. Curle went to Zimbabwe, then called Rhodesia, to work and in 1923 made a single appearance for the Rhodesia cricket team against Transvaal, scoring 34 and 8. He did not play first-class cricket after that, although he appeared for Leamington in club cricket in 1928.

A newspaper report from 1926 states that Curle was the assistant paymaster of the Beira and Mashonaland and Rhodesian Railways; the report describes the funeral in Bulawayo of his first wife, the former Mollie Roberts, who had arrived in Rhodesia only a few months earlier, had been ill since her arrival and had then died at the age of 28.
