= David Pithey =

Rhodesian cricketer

- Pithey (right) with his brother Tony

Personal information
- Full name: David Bartlett Pithey
- Born: 4 October 1936; Salisbury, Rhodesia
- Died: 21 January 2018 (aged 81); Kidlington, Oxfordshire, England
- Batting: Right-handed
- Bowling: Right-arm offbreak
- Relatives: Tony Pithey (brother)

International information
- National side: South Africa
- Test debut: 6 December 1963 v Australia
- Last Test: 20 January 1967 v Australia

Career statistics
Competition	Test	First-class
Matches	8	99
Runs scored	138	3,420
Batting average	12.54	23.26
100s/50s	0/1	3/14
Top score	55	166
Balls bowled	1,424	17,498
Wickets	12	240
Bowling average	48.08	30.78
5 wickets in innings	1	13
10 wickets in match	0	1
Best bowling	6/58	7/47
Catches/stumpings	6/–	55/–
- Source: Cricinfo, 11 August 2021

David Bartlett Pithey (4 October 1936 – 21 January 2018) was a Rhodesian cricketer who played in eight Tests for South Africa from 1963 to 1967. As well as playing for Rhodesia and Western Province, he played first-class cricket for Oxford University and Northamptonshire. Christopher Martin-Jenkins described him as "spasmodically brilliant". His brother, Tony, also played Test cricket for South Africa; they played together in five of the Tests on the 1963–64 tour of Australasia.

== Early career ==
He was educated at Plumtree School, and was selected for South Africa Schools in 1954. An off-spin bowler and useful batsman at various positions in the order, David Pithey made his first-class debut for Rhodesia in 1956–57. He attended the University of Cape Town and was selected for South African Universities against the Australian touring team in 1957–58. He took 5 for 105 in the first innings and scored 40 in the second innings to help his side avoid defeat. He played regularly in domestic cricket before winning a Rhodes Scholarship and taking up studies at St Edmund Hall, Oxford, in 1959. He played 37 first-class matches for the university team in 1960, 1961 and 1962, hitting his first century, 133 against Glamorgan at Oxford in May 1961, when he opened the batting. He took his career-best figures of 7 for 47 (off 27 overs) against the Australian touring team two weeks later, also at Oxford, in what Wisden described as a "devastating spell" in which he "perplexed the Australians". In 1962 he appeared briefly for Northamptonshire in the County Championship, and also played for the Gentlemen in the last Gentlemen v Players match to be played at Lord's.

Along with his cricket blue for Oxford he also gained a hockey blue.

Returning to Rhodesia for the 1962–63 season, he played for Rhodesia in the "B" Section of the Currie Cup, scoring 556 runs at 32.70 and taking 26 wickets at 26.88. Against North-Eastern Transvaal at Pretoria, opening the batting, he hit his highest first-class score of 166.

== Test career ==
Along with his fellow off-spinner Kelly Seymour, he was selected for the tour to Australasia in 1963–64. He took 11 wickets at 34.09 in the matches leading up to the First Test and was selected for the first three Tests, but failed to take a wicket, scored only 39 runs at 7.80 batting at number eight, and lost his place to Seymour. He was unlucky in the second innings of the Third Test in Sydney, when several catches were dropped off his bowling. He regained his spot in the three Tests in New Zealand, where he took 12 wickets at 18.66, including his best Test figures of 6 for 58 in the second innings of the Second Test at Dunedin. (It was the only occasion of a South African spinner taking six or more wickets in a Test innings in the 40 years between Hugh Tayfield, 6 for 78 in 1956–57, and Paul Adams, 6 for 55 in 1996–97.)

He played three matches in the 1964–65 season without success but found better form in 1965–66, scoring 376 runs at 37.60 and taking 13 wickets at 32.15 for Rhodesia in the "A" Section of the Currie Cup. He played in the North v. South trial match at the end of the season.

Selected for a South African XI in a match against the Australian touring team before the Test series in 1966–67, he had match figures of 49.4–25–86–5 in an important victory for the home side. He returned to the Test side for the Second and Third Tests. In the second innings of the Second Test he made 55 (his next best Test score was 18), adding 86 for the eighth wicket with Peter Pollock to help give South Africa some chance of victory after they had had to follow on. However, he took no wickets in either Test and lost his place to Jackie du Preez. In his five Tests against Australia he had taken no wickets for 353 runs.

He played the 1967–68 season for Transvaal in the "A" Section of the Currie Cup, then retired.

== Personal life ==
He worked as head of marketing at Kearsney College in Natal until 1995.

He and his wife Sarie had two daughters and a son. He died in January 2018 after suffering from Alzheimer's disease for some years.
