= Colin Duff =

Rhodesian cricketer sportsman

Personal information
- Full name: Colin Eric Duff
- Born: 28 February 1876; Cape Town, Cape Colony
- Died: 17 May 1941 (aged 65); Salisbury, Southern Rhodesia
- Batting: Right-handed
- Bowling: Right-arm medium
- Role: Bowler

Domestic team information
- Years: Team
- 1904/05–1909/10: Rhodesia

Career statistics
| Competition | First-class |
|---|---|
| Matches | 2 |
| Runs scored | 21 |
| Batting average | 7.00 |
| 100s/50s | 0/0 |
| Top score | 11* |
| Balls bowled | 366 |
| Wickets | 7 |
| Bowling average | 30.00 |
| 5 wickets in innings | 0 |
| 10 wickets in match | 0 |
| Best bowling | 4/11 |
| Catches/stumpings | 2/– |
- Source: CricketArchive, 16 November 2022

Colin Eric Duff (28 February 1876 – 17 May 1941) was a Rhodesian sportsman who played cricket and rugby union.

Duff, who grew up in the Cape Colony, played his early rugby with Western Province, before transferring to Rhodesia, with the help of former England international and Rhodesian administrator William Henry Milton. He competed for the Rhodesian rugby team in the Currie Cup and set a competition record four drop goals in a fixture against Border. The record wasn't beaten until 1992, when Naas Botha booted five drop goals for Northern Transvaal.

His elder brother, Benjamin Duff, was a rugby union player as well and was awarded the first ever Springbok cap in 1891.

Like his brother, Duff also played first-class cricket. He made his debut in the 1904/05 Currie Cup cricket season, against Transvaal. A medium pace bowler, he counted Test opener Jimmy Sinclair as one of his two first innings wickets. It was until 1910 that he appeared in another first-class fixture, with Rhodesia hosting the H. D. G. Leveson Gower's XI. He took four wickets in the space of four overs in the fourth innings, conceding 11 runs, as the match ended in a draw.
