= Ronald Willson =

English-born Zimbabwean cricketer

Personal information
- Full name: Ronald Henry Willson
- Born: 14 July 1933; Seaford, Sussex, England
- Died: 3 January 2017 (aged 83); Harare, Zimbabwe
- Batting: Left-handed
- Bowling: Slow left-arm orthodox

Domestic team information
- Years: Team
- 1961/62: Rhodesia
- 1959: Devon
- 1955–1957: Sussex

Career statistics
Competition	First-class
Matches	22
Runs scored	411
Batting average	14.17
100s/50s	1/0
Top score	113*
Balls bowled	696
Wickets	4
Bowling average	97.50
5 wickets in innings	0
10 wickets in match	–
Best bowling	1/27
Catches/stumpings	10/–
- Source: Cricinfo, 13 April 2011

Ronald Henry Willson (14 July 1933 – 3 January 2017) was an English-born Zimbabwean cricketer. Willson was a left-handed batsman who bowled slow left-arm orthodox. He was born in Seaford, Sussex.

Willson made his first-class debut for Sussex in 1955 against Oxford University, having previously played for the Sussex Second XI and the Kent Second XI. He played first-class cricket for Sussex on 19 occasions between 1955 and 1957. In these 19 matches he scored 395 runs at a batting average of 15.19, with a single century high score of 113*. Willson did not represent Sussex after 1957, but did represent Devon in a single Minor Counties Championship match in 1959 against Dorset. He later played first-class cricket for Rhodesia, making his debut for the team against Transvaal in 1961. He played two further first-class fixtures the following season, both against a touring International XI.

Willson died in Harare, Zimbabwe on 3 January 2017, aged 83.
