= Paddy Clift =

Zimbabwean cricketer (1953–1996)

Personal information
- Full name: Patrick Bernard Clift
- Born: 12 July 1953; Southern Rhodesia, Rhodesia
- Died: 3 September 1996 (aged 43); Durban, KwaZulu-Natal, South Africa
- Height: 6 ft 1 in (1.85 m)
- Batting: Right-handed
- Bowling: Right-arm medium

Domestic team information
- Years: Team
- 1980/81–1987/88: Natal
- 1979/80: Zimbabwe
- 1975–1987: Leicestershire
- 1971/72–1978/79: Rhodesia

Career statistics
Competition	First-class	List A
Matches	319	243
Runs scored	8,395	2,427
Batting average	23.64	19.73
100s/50s	2/31	–/4
Top score	106	91
Balls bowled	51,972	11,712
Wickets	876	295
Bowling average	24.66	25.45
5 wickets in innings	26	–
10 wickets in match	2	–
Best bowling	8/17	4/13
Catches/stumpings	161/–	66/–
- Source: Cricinfo, 20 October 2012

Patrick Bernard Clift (14 July 1953 – 2 September 1996) was a Zimbabwean first class cricketer for Leicestershire County Cricket Club, who was educated at St. George's College, Harare. He was a right-armed medium bowler and right-handed batsman. Clift died in South Africa after a battle with bone marrow cancer, in the same year that Leicestershire won the County Championship.

== Career highlights ==
- In April 1976 he took 8 for 17 for Leicestershire against Marylebone Cricket Club at Lord's. He finished the season with 74 wickets at 20.18. This tally included a hat-trick against Yorkshire at Grace Road.
- Won the Benson & Hedges Cup in 1985, taking 2 for 40.
- Made 100 not out in just 50 minutes against Sussex at Hove in 1983. It was the fastest century ever scored by a player for Leicestershire.
- Holds Rhodesia's eighth and ninth wicket records.
- Took 5 catches in an innings at Worcester in 1976.
- In 1984 he took 8 for 26 at Edgbaston.
