= Edward Parker (cricketer) =

Personal information
- Full name: Edward Frank Parker
- Born: 26 April 1939 (age 87); Bulawayo, Rhodesia
- Batting: Right-handed
- Bowling: Right-arm fast-medium
- Role: All-rounder

Domestic team information
- Years: Team
- 1958–1969: Rhodesia
- 1981: Griqualand West

Career statistics
Competition	FC	List A
Matches	51	1
Runs scored	1,455	19
Batting average	21.08	19.00
100s/50s	0/6	0/0
Top score	83*	19
Balls bowled	6,032	48
Wickets	100	1
Bowling average	29.77	55.00
5 wickets in innings	3	0
10 wickets in match	1	0
Best bowling	6/74	1/55
Catches/stumpings	36/–	0/–
- Source: CricketArchive, 15 August 2022

Edward Frank Parker (born 26 April 1939) was a first-class cricketer who played for Rhodesia in the Currie Cup.

Parker made his first two first-class appearances in the 1958/59 Currie Cup but didn't play again for over three years. He made his return in a match against a touring International XI team and took the wicket of Basil D'Oliveira. For the rest of the decade, Parker was a regular in the Rhodesian side for their Currie Cup campaigns and had his best season with the ball in 1967/68 when he took 24 wickets at 20.41. This tally included a match haul of 10 for 124 against Orange Free State at Bloemfontein.

In 1978, at the age of 39, Parker made a return to cricket, representing Rhodesia B in the President's Cup and Zimbabwe-Rhodesia B in the 1979/80 Castle Bowl tournament. His batting improved considerably and despite coming into the Castle Bowl with only two first-class half centuries on his resume, he finished the tournament with 416 runs at 46.22, including four half centuries.

He crossed to South African team Griqualand West for the 1981/82 SAB Bowl whom he captained in his three matches.
