= Ken Austin (cricketer) =

Rhodesian cricketer and civil servant (1908–2004)

Personal information
- Full name: Quentin Ahern Austin
- Born: 18 December 1908; Queenstown, Cape Colony
- Died: 16 July 2004 (aged 95); Harare, Zimbabwe
- Batting: Right-handed
- Bowling: Right-arm leg-spin

Domestic team information
- Years: Team
- 1927-28 to 1946-47: Rhodesia

Career statistics
Competition	First-class
Matches	5
Runs scored	65
Batting average	8.12
100s/50s	0/0
Top score	25
Balls bowled	314
Wickets	4
Bowling average	49.25
5 wickets in innings	0
10 wickets in match	0
Best bowling	4/51
Catches/stumpings	3/–
- Source: Cricinfo, 12 December 2021

Quentin Ahern "Ken" Austin ISO (18 December 1908 – 16 July 2004) was a cricketer who played five matches of first-class cricket for Rhodesia: one in April 1928, and four between March 1946 and March 1947.

Austin was educated at St Aidan's College in Grahamstown, Cape Province, and went to work in a bank. Dissatisfied with his job, he successfully applied for a position in the civil service in Salisbury, Rhodesia, in 1927 aged 18. He made his first-class debut a few months later, but was only moderately successful, making the top score of 25 in Rhodesia’s first innings of 135. Eighteen years later he resumed his first-class career, but he was even less successful, scoring only 40 runs and taking four wickets in four matches.

Austin was appointed Companion of the Imperial Service Order in 1963 for his service as Deputy Secretary in the Ministry of Local Government in Rhodesia. At the time of his death in Harare in 2004 at the age of 95, he was the oldest surviving Rhodesian cricketer.
