= George Duthie =

George Duthie FRSE (4 March 1865 – 14 June 1921) was a Scottish mathematician, educator and colonial administrator. He served as Inspector General of Education for Rhodesia (now Zimbabwe) in the early 20th century.

== Life ==
Duthie was born in Woodside, Aberdeen, Scotland to George Forsyth Duthie and Mary Campbell. In 1899, he was elected a Fellow of the Royal Society of Edinburgh. His proposers were George Chrystal, John Sturgeon Mackay, Peter Guthrie Tait and Andrew Beatson Bell. In 1900 he is listed as a member of the Edinburgh Mathematical Society and served as their president in 1901.

In Rhodesia, his role as Director of Education also held the responsibility of Government Statistician, Registrar General and Keeper of the National Census.

He died in 1921 in Salisbury, Rhodesia.

== Memorials ==
Duthie House at Chaplin High School in Zimbabwe is named after him.

== Publications ==
Duthie wrote the section on Rhodesia in the 11th edition of the Encyclopædia Britannica.
