= John Wallace (cricketer) =

Rhodesian cricketer (1924–2008)

Personal information
- Full name: John Henry Austin Wallace
- Born: 30 March 1924; Kentani, Cape Province, Union of South Africa
- Died: 15 September 2008 (aged 84)
- Batting: Right-handed
- Role: Batsman

Domestic team information
- Years: Team
- 1949/50–1953/54: Rhodesia cricket team

Career statistics
Competition	First-class
Matches	21
Runs scored	1,320
Batting average	34.73
100s/50s	4/5
Top score	138
Balls bowled	24
Wickets	0
Bowling average	–
5 wickets in innings	–
10 wickets in match	–
Best bowling	–
Catches/stumpings	11/–
- Source: Cricinfo, 22 October 2017

John Henry Austin Wallace (30 March 1924 – 15 September 2008) was a first-class cricketer who played for Rhodesia in the Currie Cup from 1949 to 1954.

Wallace, a right-handed batsman, was the only Rhodesian to pass 500 runs in the 1951/52 Currie Cup season. He had particular success against North Eastern Transvaal during his career, making 424 runs at 60.57 against them in four first-class matches and scoring two centuries. The other two centuries he made for Rhodesia came against Orange Free State and Border. He was also dismissed in the 90s on three occasions.

His son Peter played four first-class matches between 1978 and 1983.
