= Pat MacLachlan =

Scottish international rugby union player (1928–2025)

- Born: Lachlan Patrick MacLachlan; 16 March 1928 Salisbury, Southern Rhodesia
- Died: 20 March 2025 (aged 97) Vancouver, British Columbia, Canada
- School: Plumtree School, Zimbabwe
- University: Cape Town University; Oxford University

Rugby union career
- Position: Scrum half
Amateur team(s)
Years	Team	Apps	(Points)
- Salisbury Sports Club
- Oxford University
- London Scottish
Provincial / State sides
Years	Team	Apps	(Points)
- Southern Rhodesia
- Nyasaland
- Mashonaland
International career
Years	Team	Apps	(Points)
1954	Scotland	4	(0)
- Barbarians

Lachlan Patrick MacLachlan (16 March 1928 – 20 March 2025) was a Scottish international rugby union player. In his rugby career he played as a Scrum half.

== Rugby union career ==
=== Amateur career ===
A Rhodes Scholar educated at Exeter College, Oxford, MacLachlan played for Oxford University.

He then moved to play for London Scottish.

=== Provincial career ===
MacLachlan played provincially in Southern Rhodesia. He played for Southern Rhodesia, Nyasaland and Mashonaland.

=== International career ===
MacLachlan was capped for Scotland four times in 1954.

He was also capped by the Barbarians.

== Outside of rugby ==
=== Architect ===
MacLachlan studied architecture in Cape Town University. He became an Architect in Harare (then Salisbury) and in Blantyre, Malawi.

=== Teaching ===
MacLachlan became a teacher in Canada at Shawnigan Lake School on Vancouver Island, Canada. He later became Headmaster at the school.

He then ran an Independent Schools Service in Hong Kong.

=== Later life and death ===
MacLachlan lived in retirement in Canada. He died in Vancouver on 20 March 2025, at the age of 96.
