= Stephen Dinsdale =

English cricketer (born 1948)

- Born: 1948/12/30
- Other name: Steve
- Occupation: Cricket Player

Stephen Charles ("Steve") Dinsdale (born 30 December 1948) is a former Essex, Transvaal and Rhodesia cricketer.

A left-handed batsman and left-arm medium pace bowler, Dinsdale played first-class cricket between 1969 and 1976. After his debut for Rhodesia he began playing for Essex in the 1970 County Championship. He played five matches, scoring only 97 runs at 13.85 with a best of 29. He made two appearances for Transvaal First XI in the winter of 1974, scoring only 19 runs, before being dropped to the 'B' team for the remainder of the season and also the subsequent winter. In this Second XI he found more success, scoring four half-centuries in seven matches - 449 runs in total at 37.41. He was born in Buckhurst Hill, Essex.
