= Robert Robertson (field hockey) =

Rhodesian field hockey player (born 1938)

Personal information
- Nationality: Rhodesian
- Born: 31 March 1938 (age 88) Durban, South Africa

Sport
- Sport: Field hockey

Robert Robertson (born 31 March 1938) is a Rhodesian field hockey player. He competed in the men's tournament at the 1964 Summer Olympics. He also played in two first-class cricket matches for the Rhodesia cricket team.
