= Freddie Brooks (sportsman) =

England international rugby union footballer & cricketer

Personal information
- Full name: Frederick George Brooks
- Born: 1 May 1883; Bombay, British India
- Died: 5 September 1947 (aged 64); Hermanus, Cape Province, South Africa
- Batting: Right-handed
- Role: Batsman

Domestic team information
- Years: Team
- 1904/05–1909/10: Rhodesia

Career statistics
Competition	First-class
Matches	2
Runs scored	123
Batting average	30.75
100s/50s	0/2
Top score	61
Catches/stumpings	1/0
- Source: CricketArchive, 20 April 2023

Frederick George Brooks OBE (1 May 1883 – 5 September 1947) was a Rhodesian sportsman who represented his country as both a cricketer and rugby union player. He also played a Test match for the England national rugby union team.

== Early life ==
Brooks, although born in India, was educated at Bedford School in England. As well as captaining their cricket team and playing rugby, Brooks was also outstanding in athletics, becoming Public Schools champion in the 100-yard sprint, 110-yard hurdles, long jump and high jump. From 1900 to 1902, he played cricket for Bedfordshire in the Minor Counties Championship.

At the age of 19, Brooks was offered a civil service job in Rhodesia by William Henry Milton, the Administrator of the British colony. He had found out about the sporting abilities of Brooks by his two sons, rugby players Cecil and Jumbo, who were also students at Bedford School.

== Cricket ==
After immigrating to Salisbury, he impressed enough in his first season of club cricket that he earned the praise of former South African Test captain and Rhodesian resident H. H. Castens, who believed that Brooks "was good enough to play for South Africa". Brooks also won a Rhodesian tennis title and became the national record holder in high jump.

He took part in Rhodesia's inaugural first-class match, in 1905, against Transvaal in the Currie Cup cricket competition. Batting at three, Brooks top scored in the first innings with 61 of his team's 115 runs. In the second innings he opened the batting but made just one before being bowled by Richard Norden, who claimed 12 wickets for the match.

In 1906 he represented the Rhodesian rugby team in South Africa's Currie Cup as a wing three-quarter. He was considered unlucky to miss selection in the Springbok team to tour England in 1906–07 as he didn't meet the five-year residential qualification period, albeit by only a few months. Springbok vice-captain Paddy Carolin had wanted Brooks in the team and told him to come with them to England, at which time he would send a telegram to the Rugby Board seeking permission to call up Brooks as a replacement player.

While in England, Brooks again played rugby for Bedford and was selected in the South vs North fixture, which was used as a trial for spots in the national team. He scored four tries and despite coming to the country to play for the Springboks, Brooks was named in the England team for a Test against the South Africans.

The match, which was played at Crystal Palace, finished in a three-all draw, with Brooks scoring England's only points though a second half try.

He got further opportunities to play for England, against both France and England, but turned them down to get married back in Rhodesia.

When HDG Leveson-Gower's XI toured Rhodesia in the 1909–10 cricket season, Brooks was picked to make his second and final first-class appearance. After managing just 10 in his first innings, Brooks was again promoted from three to open the batting in the second innings and made 51.

His career in the civil service would see him made an Officer of the Order of the British Empire, having served as Master of the High Court and Chairman of the Public Service.
