= Jock Thompson (cricketer) =

Rhodesia cricketer and soldier

Personal information
- Full name: John de Lisle Thompson
- Born: 12 July 1904; Cape Town, South Africa
- Died: 11 April 1978 (aged 73); Muizenberg, Cape Town, South Africa
- Batting: Right-handed
- Role: Wicket-keeper

Domestic team information
- Years: Team
- 1927-28 to 1935-36: Rhodesia

Career statistics
Competition	First-class
Matches	10
Runs scored	341
Batting average	20.05
100s/50s	0/0
Top score	47
Balls bowled	0
Wickets	–
Bowling average	–
5 wickets in innings	–
10 wickets in match	–
Best bowling	–
Catches/stumpings	14/4
- Source: Cricinfo, 7 January 2020

John de Lisle Thompson OBE (12 July 1904 – 11 April 1978) was a cricketer who played first-class cricket for Rhodesia from 1928 to 1936, and a soldier.

== Life and career ==
Jock Thompson was born in Cape Town but educated at Milton High School in Bulawayo, where he was head prefect in 1924 and captained the cricket and rugby teams.

In cricket Thompson was a wicket-keeper who often opened the batting. He was Rhodesia's wicket-keeper in 1931-32 when they finished second in the Currie Cup. He scored 28 and 47 that season in the one-wicket victory over Griqualand West. In his last first-class match he captained Rhodesia against the touring Australians in 1935-36. He also represented Rhodesia at rugby.

He was the author of A History of Sport in Southern Rhodesia, published in 1935. During World War II he served as an officer in West Africa, North Africa, and later in Europe, and after the war he became commanding officer of the 2nd Battalion of the Rhodesia Regiment. He was a director of the Thomas Meikle Trust and Investment Company.

He was awarded the OBE in the 1951 New Year Honours.
