= Dobbo Townshend =

Zimbabwean cricketer (1944–2013)

Derrick Townshend
Personal information
- Full name: Derrick Walter Townshend
- Born: 19 April 1944; Johannesburg, South Africa
- Died: 8 June 2013 (aged 69); Bulawayo, Zimbabwe
- Source: ESPNcricinfo, 3 June 2016

Derrick Walter "Dobbo" Townshend (19 April 1944 – 8 June 2013) was a Zimbabwean cricket administrator, match referee, and cricketer.

Townshend was born on 19 April 1944 in Johannesburg. He played five first-class matches for Rhodesia between 1967 and 1969.

From 2006 to 2007, Townshend served as the president of the Matabeleland Cricket Association.

He was variously manager of the national team, coach and manager of Matabeleland, and a match referee in domestic competitions.
