= Ronald Coventry =

Zimbabwean cricketer

Personal information
- Full name: Ronald Wilfred Coventry
- Born: 29 May 1928; Hartley, Rhodesia
- Batting: Right-handed
- Bowling: Left-arm fast-medium

Domestic team information
- Years: Team
- 1953-54 to 1957-58: Rhodesia

Career statistics
Competition	First-class
Matches	17
Runs scored	386
Batting average	15.44
100s/50s	0/2
Top score	94
Balls bowled	2520
Wickets	29
Bowling average	36.65
5 wickets in innings	0
10 wickets in match	0
Best bowling	4/21
Catches/stumpings	28/–
- Source: Cricinfo, 9 August 2016

Ronald Wilfred Coventry (born 29 May 1928) is a former cricketer who played first-class cricket for Rhodesia from 1953 to 1958.

Coventry was an all-rounder, who batted at various positions in the order and often opened the bowling. He wore spectacles while playing. He made his first-class debut against the touring New Zealanders in 1953-54. In the second innings he made a quick 63, including 24 off one over from John Reid, playing shots that Reid thought resembled tennis, rather than cricket, shots. "I didn't know where to bowl," Reid admitted.

Coventry's best season was 1955–56, when he scored 213 runs for Rhodesia at an average of 30.42, including his highest score of 94 against Orange Free State, and took 16 wickets at 20.31. Rhodesia won the Currie Cup B Section title, winning all six of their matches.

According to CricketArchive he is still alive as of March 2026, but according to Cricinfo he is "presumed dead".
