= William Houghton =

William Houghton may refer to:

- William Houghton (bishop) (died 1298), Roman Catholic Archbishop of Dublin, Ireland
- William Houghton (naturalist) (1828–1895), author of British Fresh-Water Fishes (1879)
- William Houghton (American football) (1908–2001), American football coach
- William Henry Houghton (1887–1947), president of the Moody Bible Institute
- William Stanley Houghton (1881-1913), British playwright
- William Vasey Houghton (1921–2001), Australian politician
- William Houghton (cricketer) (born 1955), Zimbabwean cricketer
