= Thomas Symington =

Rhodesian cricketer

Thomas Percival Syminton (May 1904 – 7 April 1987) was a cricketer who played six First-class cricket matches for Rhodesia between 1929 and 1931.

He was educated at Ardingly College. He died in Western Australia in 1987.
