= Michael Holman (journalist) =

British journalist and writer (born 1945)

- Born: 23 December 1945 (age 80); Penzance, United Kingdom
- Occupations: Journalist, author
- Notable credit(s): Africa editor, Financial Times
- Website: http://www.michael-holman.com

Michael Holman (born 23 December 1945) is a British journalist and writer. He was the Africa Editor of the Financial Times from 1984 to 2002 and has written several novels and an autobiography.

He was born in Penzance, Cornwall, but his parents emigrated to Southern Rhodesia when he was two. He was educated at Chaplin High School and studied English at University College of Rhodesia where he was awarded a BA in 1968.

Holman was the co-editor of Black & White, a satirical magazine. The publication was banned by the Rhodesian government and he was arrested in August 1968 and restricted to his home town of Gwelo under the Law & Order (Maintenance) Act. In August 1969 the order was extended for a further year.

He was granted an exit permit to attend the University of Edinburgh and was awarded an MSc in Politics in 1971. From 1972 he worked as a freelance journalist based in London. In 1977 he was appointed Africa correspondent for the Financial Times, based in Lusaka, Zambia and in 1984 he was promoted to Africa Editor.

In his late 30s, Holman was diagnosed with Parkinson's disease, and has written on the experience of undergoing deep brain stimulation surgery.

== Novels ==
Holman has written three novels and an autobiography:

- Last Orders at Harrods, Polygon, 2005
- Fatboy and the Dancing Ladies, Polygon, 2007
- Dizzy Worms, Polygon, 2010
- Postmark Africa: Half A Century As A Foreign Correspondent, EnvelopeBooks, 2020
