= Michael Kettle =

English cricketer (born 1944)

Personal information
- Full name: Michael Keith Kettle
- Born: 18 March 1944 (age 82); Stamford, Lincolnshire, England
- Batting: Right-handed
- Bowling: Left-arm medium

Domestic team information
- Years: Team
- 1963–1970: Northamptonshire
- 1974/75: Rhodesia

Career statistics
Competition	First-class	List A
Matches	88	23
Runs scored	1,117	97
Batting average	13.14	8.08
100s/50s	0/4	0/0
Top score	88	19
Balls bowled	10,712	1,113
Wickets	179	23
Bowling average	26.81	31.82
5 wickets in innings	5	0
10 wickets in match	0	0
Best bowling	6/67	4/19
Catches/stumpings	63/–	9/–
- Source: Cricinfo, 30 December 2019

Michael Keith Kettle (born 18 March 1944) is an English former cricketer who played first-class cricket for Northamptonshire from 1963 to 1970. Kettle was born in Stamford, Lincolnshire, but moved with his father to Southern Rhodesia in 1953. He was spotted by Northamptonshire at the age of 16, while playing a trial match for them whilst on holiday in England. In 1962, he returned from Africa to join the county side at the age of 18. He remained with Northamptonshire until 1970, playing 88 first-class matches. In February 1974, he appeared for Rhodesia in a Gillette Cup match against Natal. After retiring from playing Kettle became a cricket coach at Repton School in Derbyshire and, in his late 70s, a groundskeeper at Mickleover.

== Early life ==
Kettle was born in Stamford, Lincolnshire. He is the eldest son of Betty Healey and Keith Kettle, who bowled for Burghley Park Cricket Club, based near Stamford, and previously for Oakham Cricket Club. In 1953 Kettle went to Southern Rhodesia with his father, who was offered a job as a teacher in Bulawayo.

== Cricket career ==
At the age of 16 and on vacation in England, he was playing for Burghley Park when he was spotted by Northamptonshire County Cricket Club and in August 1960 took a five-for for just three runs in a trial for them bowling against a Wellingborough second team. Percy Davis recommended that he join the county team but Kettle was due to return to Southern Rhodesia that August and did so. In October 1961 Northamptonshire announced that Kettle would return from Africa to join the team in March 1962, when he would be 18. Before his first match Kettle underwent surgery for appendicitis.

Kettle appeared in 88 first-class matches for Northamptonshire as a left-arm medium-pace bowler and useful tail-end batsman between 1963 and 1970. He scored 1,117 runs with a highest score of 88 and took 179 wickets with a best performance of 6 for 67 against Sussex in 1968. In July 1965 his five-for-53 in the first innings played a key role in a 2-day defeat of Nottinghamshire at Trent Bridge.

He took 2 for 30 and 5 for 58 when Northamptonshire beat the touring West Indians in 1966. His favourite cricket memory came from this match when he took the wicket of Garfield Sobers in both innings (for 45 runs in the first innings and 4 in the second).

Kettle appeared for Rhodesia in a Gillette Cup match against Natal at Salisbury on 8 February 1974. He took one wicket for 47 runs conceded in a match that Rhodesia lost by two wickets with five balls remaining.

== Later life ==
After retiring from playing, Kettle became a cricket coach at Repton School in Derbyshire and also became an umpire. In later life he became a groundskeeper at Mickleover Cricket Club and on 9 September 2024 received Cricket World Magazine's Groundcare Lifetime Achievement award at Lord's Cricket Ground. He and fellow winner Alan Hancock worked over two seasons to improve the club's square, which had been left in a very poor condition.
