= Scotty Adamson =

Zimbabwean cricketer (1906–1962)

Personal information
- Full name: James Adamson
- Born: 1906; Waterval, Transvaal Colony, South Africa
- Died: 1962 (aged 55–56); Salisbury (now Harare), Southern Rhodesia
- Batting: Left-handed
- Bowling: Slow left arm orthodox

Domestic team information
- Years: Team
- 1931-32: Rhodesia

Career statistics
Competition	First class
Matches	5
Runs scored	48
Batting average	8
100s/50s	0/0
Top score	24*
Balls bowled	702
Wickets	21
Bowling average	17.71
5 wickets in innings	1
10 wickets in match	0
Best bowling	5/38
Catches/stumpings	0/0
- Source: CricketArchive, 28 September 2016

James "Scotty" Adamson (1906–1962) was a Rhodesian cricketer, who played for Rhodesia in first-class cricket.
