= Marshall Davies =

Rhodesian cricketer

Personal information
- Full name: Marshall William Davies
- Born: 17 August 1930 (age 96); Bulawayo, Rhodesia
- Batting: Left-handed
- Role: Batsman

Domestic team information
- Years: Team
- 1951–1956: Rhodesia cricket team

Career statistics
| Competition | FC |
|---|---|
| Matches | 20 |
| Runs scored | 1096 |
| Batting average | 39.14 |
| 100s/50s | 3/6 |
| Top score | 133 |
| Catches/stumpings | 6/– |
- Source: CricketArchive, 15 August 2022

Marshall William Davies (born 17 August 1930) was a first-class cricketer who played for Rhodesia in the Currie Cup.

After appearing for Rhodesia sporadically from his debut in 1951, Davies cemented a spot in the middle order in the 1954-55 Currie Cup season by making 353 runs at 58.83. This tally included his highest first-class score of 133 which he made against Griqualand West at De Beers Stadium in Kimberley.

Davies did even better the following season and from his six matches made 432 runs 61.71, with another century against Griqualand West and one against Orange Free State.
