= Peter Oldham =

English and Rhodesian cricketer (1924–2011)

Personal information
- Full name: Peter Desmond Oldham
- Born: 16 March 1924; Chapel-en-le-Frith, Derwent, Derbyshire, England
- Died: 9 August 2011 (aged 87); Kleinmond, Western Cape, South Africa
- Batting: Right-handed
- Bowling: Right arm offbreak

Career statistics
Competition	FC
Matches	2
Runs scored	45
Batting average	11.25
100s/50s	0/0
Top score	28
Balls bowled	-
Wickets	3
Bowling average	51.33
5 wickets in innings	0
10 wickets in match	0
Best bowling	3/93
Catches/stumpings	1/-
- Source: Cricinfo, 29 December 2024

Peter Desmond Oldham (16 March 1924 – 9 August 2011) was an English first-class cricketer. He played two first-class matches representing Rhodesia. He was part of the Rhodesia squad which played a tour game against Australia in Bulawayo in November 1949 and the game was played prior to the start of the Australia's bilateral test series against South Africa in South Africa in December 1949.

== See also ==
- List of Rhodesian representative cricketers
