= Raylton Club Ground =

- Interactive map of Raylton Club Ground

Ground information
- Location: Bulawayo, Matabeleland
- Country: Zimbabwe
- Coordinates: 20.1652°S 28.5708°E
- Establishment: c. 1924

Team information
Rhodesia	(1924/25–1948/49)
- As of 9 December 2013; Source: Ground profile

Raylton Club Ground was a cricket ground in Bulawayo, Matabeleland, Zimbabwe, attached to the Raylton Club from which it gets its name. Today the ground no longer functions for cricketing purposes.

== History ==
Established prior to 1924, the ground first played host to first-class cricket in December 1924 when Rhodesia played SB Joel's XI. Rhodesia next played first-class cricket there against Transvaal in March 1928, while only a single first-class match was played there in the 1930s when Rhodesia played the touring Australians. Four further first-class matches were played there in the later 1940s, with the last seeing Rhodesia play the touring Marylebone Cricket Club in January 1949. No cricket is recorded as having been played there since this match.

== Records ==
=== First-class ===
- Highest team total: 489/8 by Transvaal v Rhodesia, 1945/46
- Lowest team total: 121 all out by Rhodesia v SB Joel's XI, 1924/25
- Highest individual innings: 161 by Desmond Fell for Natal v Rhodesia, 1946/47
- Best bowling in an innings: 6/27 by Hugh Tayfield, as above
- Best bowling in a match 10/158 by Xen Balaskas for Transvaal v Rhodesia, 1945/46

== See also ==
- List of cricket grounds in Zimbabwe
