= Gerald Linnell =

English cricketer

Personal information
- Full name: Michael Gerald Linnell
- Born: 13 January 1876; Reigate, Surrey, England
- Died: 2 August 1959 (aged 83); Salisbury, Southern Rhodesia
- Batting: Right-handed
- Bowling: Right-arm medium-fast

Domestic team information
- Years: Team
- 1904/05: Rhodesia

Career statistics
Competition	First-class
Matches	2
Runs scored	36
Batting average	12.00
100s/50s	–/–
Top score	15
Balls bowled	24
Wickets	0
Bowling average	–
5 wickets in innings	–
10 wickets in match	–
Best bowling	–
Catches/stumpings	1/–
- Source: Cricinfo, 26 July 2019

Michael Gerald Linnell (13 January 1876 – 2 August 1959) was an English first-class cricketer.

The grandson of the painter John Linnell, he was born at Reigate in January 1876. He emigrated to Rhodesia in 1896 and served in the Matabeleland Relief Force during the Matabeleland Rebellion of 1896. While in Rhodesia he made a single appearance in first-class cricket for the Rhodesia cricket team against Transvaal in the 1904-05 Currie Cup. Returning to England, he made a further first-class appearance for H. D. G. Leveson Gower's XI against Oxford University at Oxford in 1909. He scored a total of 36 runs in his two first-class appearances, with a high score of 15. He later died in Rhodesia at Salisbury in August 1959.
