= Michael Lee (Zimbabwean cricketer) =

Zimbabwean cricketer (1935–2012)

Personal information
- Full name: John Michael Lee
- Born: 19 October 1935; Tolworth, Surrey, England
- Died: 12 September 2012 (aged 76); Cape Town, South Africa
- Source: ESPNcricinfo, 27 June 2016

Michael Lee (19 October 1935 – 12 September 2012) was a Zimbabwean cricketer. He played first-class cricket for Rhodesia and Western Province between 1957 and 1960.
