= Jeremy Baldwin =

Rhodesian cricketer

Personal information
- Full name: Jeremy Michael Sydney Baldwin
- Born: 26 September 1930; Bulawayo, Rhodesia
- Died: 19 March 2004 (aged 73); Harare, Zimbabwe
- Batting: Right-handed
- Bowling: Right arm offbreak

Domestic team information
- Years: Team
- 1949/50–1956/57: Rhodesia

Career statistics
Competition	First-class
Matches	19
Runs scored	639
Batting average	19.36
100s/50s	0/4
Top score	65
Catches/stumpings	11/–
- Source: Cricinfo, 29 December 2024

Jeremy Michael Sydney Baldwin (26 September 1930 – 19 March 2004) was a Rhodesian first-class cricketer.

Baldwin played nineteen first-class matches in his career. He was part of the Rhodesia squad which played a tour game against Australia in Bulawayo in November 1949 and the game was played prior to the start of the Australia's bilateral test series against South Africa in South Africa in December 1949.
