= Terence Bowes =

Rhodesian sportsman

Personal information
- Full name: Terence Russell Crosby Bowes
- Born: 17 August 1951 (age 75); Bulawayo, Southern Rhodesia
- Batting: Right-handed
- Bowling: Right-arm fast-medium
- Role: Bowler

Domestic team information
- Years: Team
- 1971/72–1974/75: Rhodesia

Career statistics
Competition	First-class	List A
Matches	4	1
Runs scored	29	4
Batting average	7.25	4.00
100s/50s	0/0	0/0
Top score	13	4
Balls bowled	390	42
Wickets	4	1
Bowling average	58.25	24.00
5 wickets in innings	0	0
10 wickets in match	0	0
Best bowling	3/38	1/24
Catches/stumpings	2/–	1/–
- Source: CricketArchive, 20 April 2023

Terence Russel Crosby Bowes (born 17 August 1951) is a former Rhodesian sportsman who represented his country in both cricket and rugby union during the 1970s.

Bowes, a flyhalf, was first capped for the Rhodesian rugby union team in 1970. A former Hamilton High School student, he played at club level for Old Miltonians. Off the field he worked for a Bulawayo steel company.

As a right-arm fast-medium bowler, Bowes was a good enough cricketer to appear in four first-class cricket matches for the Rhodesia cricket team. Three of those were in the 1971/72 Currie Cup season and the other in 1974/75. His best performances came on debut, against Eastern Province, when he took 3–38 in the first innings, including the wickets of both openers.
