= Benjamin Duff =

South Africa cricketer and rugby union player

Ben Duff
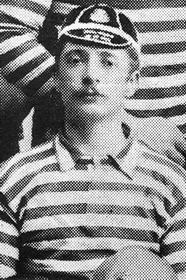
- Born: Benjamin Robert Duff; 16 October 1867 Swellendam, Cape Colony
- Died: 25 June 1943 (aged 75) Pretoria, Transvaal, South Africa
- School: South African College High School
- Notable relative: Colin Duff (brother)

Rugby union career
- Position: Fullback
Amateur team(s)
Years	Team	Apps	(Points)
–	Hamilton		
Provincial / State sides
Years	Team	Apps	(Points)
1888–1892	Western Province		(0)
International career
Years	Team	Apps	(Points)
1891	South Africa	3	(0)
- Correct as of 19 July 2010

Benjamin Robert Duff (16 October 1867 – 25 June 1943) was a South African rugby union international. He is officially recognised as Springbok No. 1. Alongside rugby union, Duff also played a first-class cricket match for Western Province.

== Personal life ==
Duff, born in Swellendam, had a brother Colin who represented Rhodesia in cricket and rugby. He married Isabel Watkinson.

== Cricket career ==
Duff's cricket match was against Natal during the 1889/90 South African cricket season. Although he batted with the tail, at number 10 in both innings, Duff wasn't called on to bowl once in the match. He scored one and eight not out, dismissed by Test player Gus Kempis in the first dig. Western Province's wicket-keeper for this game, Alfred Richards, was also a rugby union international and the duo appeared together in a Test with the South African national rugby union team.

== Rugby union career ==
In 1891, Duff played three rugby union Test matches in a home series against the British Isles. These were the first ever official Tests that South Africa played and due to the order in which players' names were listed on team sheets for a match at the time, Duff has the distinction of being the first Springbok. He played his games as a full-back and represented Western Province at provincial rugby.

=== Test history ===
No.	Opponents	Results(SA 1st)	Position	Tries	Date	Venue
1.	(United Kingdom) British Isles	0–4	Fullback		30 Jul 1891	Crusaders Ground, Port Elizabeth
2.	(United Kingdom) British Isles	0–3	Fullback		29 Aug 1891	Eclectic Cricket Ground, Kimberley
3.	(United Kingdom) British Isles	0–4	Fullback		5 Sep 1891	Newlands, Cape Town

== See also ==
- List of South Africa national rugby union players – Springbok no. 1
