= Thomas Davidson (South African cricketer) =

South African cricketer (1906–1987)

Personal information
- Born: 6 August 1906; Uitenhage, South Africa
- Died: 13 January 1987 (aged 80); Cape Town, South Africa
- Source: Cricinfo, 6 December 2020

Thomas Davidson (6 August 1906 – 13 January 1987) was a South African cricketer. He played in eight first-class matches from 1926/27 to 1938/39.
