= Edgar Morris =

Rhodesian cricketer (1914–2002)

Edgar David Morris (born May 12, 1914, in Harare (then Salisbury), died May 21, 2002, Johannesburg) was a Rhodesian cricket player.

He appeared in the Rhodesian representation in two first-class matches in 1945.
