= Gerald Curle =

English cricketer

Personal information
- Full name: Gerald Curle
- Born: 7 June 1893; Leamington Spa, Warwickshire, England
- Died: 4 March 1977 (aged 83); Budleigh Salterton, Devon, England
- Batting: Right-handed
- Bowling: Right-arm off break
- Relatives: Arthur Curle (brother)

Domestic team information
- Years: Team
- 1913: Warwickshire

Career statistics
Competition	First-class
Matches	5
Runs scored	54
Batting average	6.00
100s/50s	–/–
Top score	34
Balls bowled	10
Wickets	1
Bowling average	3.00
5 wickets in innings	–
10 wickets in match	–
Best bowling	1/3
Catches/stumpings	2/–
- Source: Cricinfo, 13 May 2012

Gerald Curle (7 June 1893 – 4 March 1977) was an English cricketer. Curle was a right-handed batsman who bowled right-arm off break. He was born at Leamington Spa, Warwickshire, and was educated at King Edward's School, Birmingham.

Curle made his first-class debut for Warwickshire against Hampshire in the 1913 County Championship. He made four further first-class appearances for the county in that season, the last of which came against Leicestershire. In his five first-class matches, he scored 54 runs at an average of 6.00, with a high score of 34. He also took a single wicket with the ball.

He died at Budleigh Salterton, Devon, on 4 March 1977. His brother, Arthur, was also a first-class cricketer.
