= Frank Davidson (South African cricketer) =

South African cricketer (1912–1999)

Personal information
- Born: 30 December 1912; Vryburg, South Africa
- Died: 28 December 1999 (aged 86); Marondera, Zimbabwe
- Source: Cricinfo, 6 December 2020

Frank Davidson (30 December 1912 – 28 December 1999) was a South African cricketer. He played in three first-class matches in 1938/39 and 1939/40.
