= Sydney Martin (footballer) =

South African soccer player

Sydney H. Martin
Personal information
- Full name: Sydney H. Martin
- Place of birth: Durban, South Africa
- Position: Inside right

Senior career*
Years	Team	Apps	(Gls)
1927	Huddersfield Town	0	(0)
1928	Grimsby Town	0	(0)
1929	Gillingham	2	(0)
- * Club domestic league appearances and goals

Sydney H. Martin was a South African football player who played as an inside right for Huddersfield Town, Grimsby Town and Gillingham in the Football League.
