= Kevin Arnott (cricketer) =

Zimbabwean cricketer (born 1961)

Personal information
- Full name: Kevin John Arnott
- Born: 8 March 1961 (age 65); Salisbury, Rhodesia
- Batting: Right-handed
- Role: Batsman
- Relatives: Don Arnott (father)

International information
- National side: Zimbabwe (1987–1993)
- Test debut (cap 1): 18 October 1992 v India
- Last Test: 13 March 1993 v India
- ODI debut (cap 17): 17 October 1987 v India
- Last ODI: 22 March 1993 v India

Career statistics
Competition	Test	ODI	FC	LA
Matches	4	13	35	35
Runs scored	302	238	1,719	758
Batting average	43.14	23.80	30.69	23.68
100s/50s	1/1	0/3	3/11	0/6
Top score	101*	60	121	85
Catches/stumpings	4/–	3/–	23/–	11/–
- Source: ESPNcricinfo, 10 July 2017

Kevin John Arnott (born 8 March 1961) is a former Zimbabwe cricketer who played in four Test matches and 13 One Day Internationals from 1987 to 1993. He was the first Zimbabwean to face a ball in Test cricket, and the second to make a Test century. His highest score in a Test innings was 101 not out made against New Zealand at Bulawayo in 1992.

He appeared in both the World Cup tournaments in 1987 and 1992. His father, Don, played first-class cricket Rhodesia during the 1950s. He is a past pupil of Prince Edward School, Harare and graduated from Cape Town University. He is the first Test cap for Zimbabwe.

After his cricket career, Arnott became a lawyer in Harare.
