= Plumtree School =

Coordinates: 20.4864°S 27.8098°E

- Plumtree School Crest
- Plumtree, Matabeleland South; Zimbabwe

Information
- Type: Private/Public, boarding
- Motto: Ad Definitum Finem (Latin: To definite end)
- Established: 1902
- Headmaster: S.Khumalo
- Enrollment: 500 (approx.)
- Website: https://plumtreeschool.co.zw

Plumtree School is a boarding school for boys and girls in the Matabeleland region of Zimbabwe on the border with Botswana. Founded in 1902 by a railway mission, Plumtree School boards 500+ pupils. Previously a boys' school, it began enrolling girls in 2016.

== Historical background ==
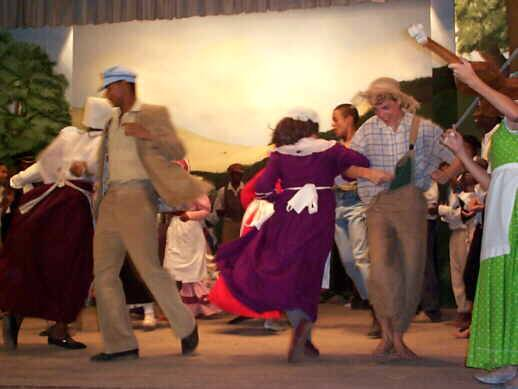
"Tom Sawyer" 2001

In 1897 a siding on the railway line between Mafeking and Bulawayo was named Plumtree. It lies on the watershed of the Western Matabeleland Highveld at an altitude of 1389 metres 100 kilometres from Bulawayo. During that time, the construction of the Cape-to-Cairo railway was underway and around 1902 the railway had just come through what was then the Bechuanaland Border.

The school was founded by the Railway Mission largely to cater for the children of the employees of the old Cape Government Railways at work on the Cape-to-Cairo railway who were resident alongside the line between Mafeking and Bulawayo. The first classes were held in a rondavel in the garden of Mr. And Mrs. S. J. Smith whose nine children formed the nucleus of the student body. Subsequently, classes were moved to the dining room of the Plumtree Hotel which doubled as the Station Refreshment room. A little later a large room was made available in the customs house.

In 1902 the school moved to the present site. The original 5-acre (20,000 m^{2}) plot was steadily extended so that the school occupied a one square kilometre site bordering on Plumtree village.

In 1906 a much beloved headmaster Robert (Bob) Hammond (known as maTambo) was appointed to take the school from the family enterprise it had been to a school rated in the 1930's as one of the top ten leading schools in the Commonwealth. Under Hammond's guidance over the next 30 years, the character of the school was formed in a similar vein to Gordonstoun and Geelong - determined to produce the best leaders of the future. Due to its remote location, senior boys were allowed to hunt for the school pot, in groups of three plus a young Ndebele tracker. In doing so, they spoke fluent Sindebele, learned the ways of the wild and the culture of its people. During Hammond's time, the school became known not only for the number of Rhodes Scholars it produced, but also for the fact that the major percentage of school leavers opted to work with the Africans within the Native Administration Department, as Native and District Commissioners.

In 2015, the school was granted permission by the government to enrol girls in order to boost lowering enrolment figures. Although a handful of girls were pupils in its founding years, Plumtree School was a boys' school for more than a century.

== Houses ==
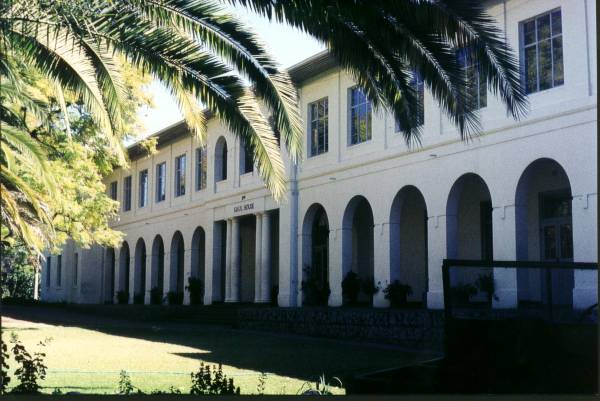
Gaul House

The school is at the edge of Plumtree. It is divided into four houses and one boarding hall:

House	Year built	Head of House (2018)	Colors
Milner House	1911	L. Kyle	
Lloyd House	1924	Thabo Newson	
Grey House	1926	D. Terrence	
Gaul House	1941	Everson James	
Hammond Hall	1976	N/A	N/A

== Notable alumni ==
- Ralph Mupita, MTN Group CEO
- Iain Butchart, Zimbabwean cricketer
- Chris Dixon (1943-2011), Rhodesian Air Force pilot, also known as "Green Leader"
- Terry Duffin (headboy; 2000), Zimbabwean cricketer; former Zimbabwe Cricket captain
- Adrian Garvey, Zimbabwean/South African rugby player
- Rollo Hayman, Rhodesian cabinet minister
- Anthony Ireland (1997–2002), Zimbabwean cricketer
- David Lewis, Rhodesian cricketer
- Henry Olonga (headboy; 1994), Zimbabwean cricketer
- Pat MacLachlan, Rhodesian rugby player
- Tony Pithey, Rhodesian/South African cricketer
- David Pithey, Rhodesian/South African cricketer and Rhodes Scholar
- Des van Jaarsveldt, Rhodesian/South African rugby player
- Lieutenant-General Peter Walls (1927-2010), Rhodesian Army Commander

https://www.telegraph.co.uk/news/obituaries/military-obituaries/special-forces-obituaries/7913263/Lieutenant-General-Peter-Walls.html
