= Victor Bourdillon =

Rhodesian cricketer (1897–1985)

Personal information
- Full name: Victor Edmund Bourdillon
- Born: 18 June 1897; Bloemfontein, Orange Free State, South Africa
- Died: 16 July 1985 (aged 88); Harare, Zimbabwe
- Batting: Right-handed
- Relatives: Thomas Bourdillon (brother); Paul Bourdillon (great-nephew)

Domestic team information
- Years: Team
- 1919: Sussex

Career statistics
Competition	First-class
Matches	3
Runs scored	15
Batting average	2.50
100s/50s	–/–
Top score	7
Balls bowled	–
Wickets	–
Bowling average	–
5 wickets in innings	–
10 wickets in match	–
Best bowling	–
Catches/stumpings	–/–
- Source: Cricinfo, 16 January 2012

Victor Edmund Bourdillon (18 June 1897 – 16 September 1985) was a South African born Rhodesian cricketer. Bourdillon was a right-handed batsman. He was born at Bloemfontein, Orange Free State, and was educated at Brighton College in England.

Bourdillon played three first-class matches for Sussex in the 1919 County Championship against Gloucestershire, Nottinghamshire and Essex. He struggled in his three first-class matches, scoring just 15 runs at an average of 2.50, with a high score of 7.

He died at Harare, Zimbabwe on 16 September 1985. His brother, Thomas, played first-class cricket, as did his great-nephew Paul Bourdillon.
