= Richard Norden (cricketer) =

South African cricketer

Personal information
- Full name: Richard Watts Norden
- Born: 4 January 1879; Cape Town, Cape Colony
- Died: 20 February 1952 (aged 73); Johannesburg, Transvaal, South Africa
- Bowling: Slow left-arm orthodox spin

Domestic team information
- Years: Team
- 1903–04 to 1906–07: Transvaal

Career statistics
Competition	First-class
Matches	8
Runs scored	128
Batting average	16.00
100s/50s	0/0
Top score	45*
Balls bowled	632
Wickets	20
Bowling average	14.50
5 wickets in innings	1
10 wickets in match	1
Best bowling	8/12
Catches/stumpings	7/–
- Source: Cricinfo, 19 October 2020

Richard Watts Norden (4 January 1879 – 20 February 1952) was a South African cricketer who played first-class cricket for Transvaal from 1904 to 1907.

Norden was a left-arm spin bowler who played in the Transvaal teams that won the Currie Cup in 1903–04 and 1904–05. His outstanding match was the semi-final in 1904–05, when he took 4 for 21 and 8 for 12 (figures of 12–8–12–8) in Transvaal's innings victory over Rhodesia. After the match Norden was presented with the ball suitably mounted, a piece of memorabilia that now appears in the Gauteng Cricket Museum. The match was Rhodesia's first in the Currie Cup; they did not return to the competition until 1929–30.
