= Stuart Robertson (cricketer) =

Zimbabwean cricketer (born 1947)

Cricket information
- Batting: Left-handed
- Bowling: Right-arm medium

Career statistics
| Competition | First-class | List A |
|---|---|---|
| Matches | 77 | 18 |
| Runs scored | 4,343 | 439 |
| Batting average | 33.15 | 29.26 |
| 100s/50s | 3/28 | 1/1 |
| Top score | 136 | 100 |
| Balls bowled | 95 | 60 |
| Wickets | 1 | 0 |
| Bowling average | 33.00 | – |
| 5 wickets in innings | 0 | – |
| 10 wickets in match | 0 | – |
| Best bowling | 1/9 | – |
| Catches/stumpings | 111/1 | 9/– |
- Source: Cricinfo, 10 October 2022

Stuart David Robertson (born 1 May 1947) is a former Zimbabwean first class cricketer. He played for what was then Rhodesia during the 1970s. In 1972 he was one of the South African Cricket Annual Cricketers of the Year.
