= Denis Tomlinson =

South African cricketer (1910–1993)

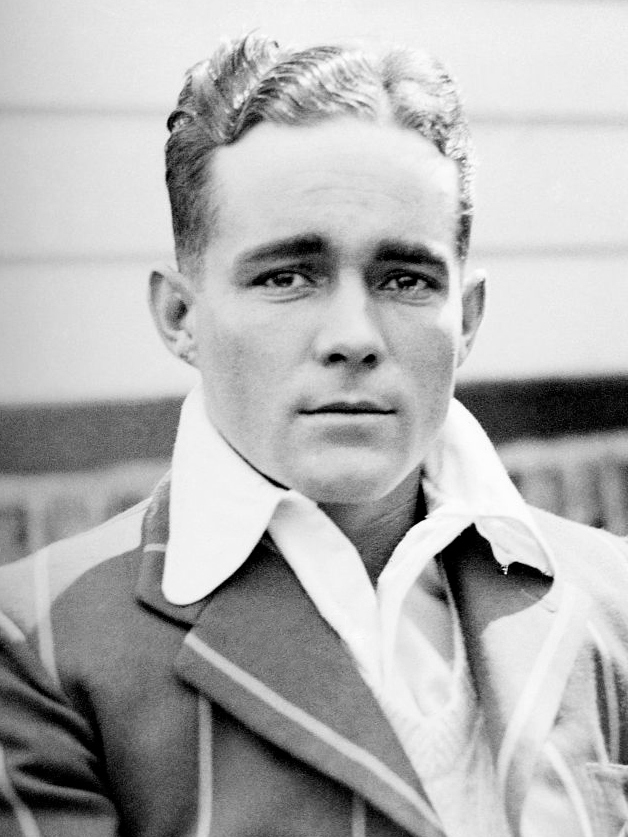
- Tomlinson in about 1935

Personal information
- Born: 4 September 1910; Umtali, Rhodesia
- Died: 11 July 1993 (aged 82); Durban, South Africa
- Batting: Right-handed
- Bowling: Leg-break and googly

International information
- National side: South Africa
- Only Test: 15 June 1935 v England

Career statistics
Competition	Test	First-class
Matches	1	48
Runs scored	9	912
Batting average	9.00	16.88
100s/50s	0/0	1/2
Top score	9	109
Balls bowled	60	7,123
Wickets	0	156
Bowling average	–	28.32
5 wickets in innings	–	9
10 wickets in match	–	1
Best bowling	–	6/56
Catches/stumpings	0/–	17/–
- Source: Cricinfo, 14 November 2022

Denis Stanley Tomlinson (4 September 1910 – 11 July 1993) was a Rhodesian cricketer who played in one Test match for South Africa in 1935. He was the first Rhodesian-born cricketer to represent South Africa.

== Early cricket career ==
Tomlinson was a right-handed batsman who played mostly in the middle- to lower-order but occasionally was used as an opener, and a right-arm leg-break and googly bowler. He was educated at Prince Edward School and played for the school First XI in 1928. He made his first-class cricket debut for Rhodesia in 1927–28 and played intermittently for the same side until 1947–48, also playing a single match in 1928–29 for Border. His first-class cricket was restricted, however, by the limited number of matches played by Rhodesia: the side did not contest the Currie Cup competition between 1932–33 and the end of the Second World War.

In his limited appearances, though, Tomlinson was successful. In his only match of the 1930–31 season, he took five wickets for 106 runs in the match against the MCC touring team, though he was not then selected for any of the Tests. Further good performances followed across the following two seasons. Against Eastern Province in 1931–32, opening the batting, he scored 109, his only first-class century. And playing for "The Rest" against Western Province in 1932–33, he took 10 wickets in the match for the only time in his career. That match, however, was his last first-class appearance before his selection, more than two years later, for the 1935 South African tour to England.

== Test player in England ==
Tomlinson played 19 first-class matches during the 1935 tour of England but was not rated as a success in the tour write-up in the 1936 Wisden: "Tomlinson revealed early promise but accomplished nothing when given a chance in the first of the Tests," it wrote. "He seemed unable to pitch the steady length so essential for a spin bowler."

Tomlinson played more first-class matches than expected because Xen Balaskas was injured for much of the season, but his inability to seize his chances meant that he appeared in only the first Test, and thereafter, South Africa's spin needs were covered by Cyril Vincent, with support from Bruce Mitchell. In his solitary Test, the only one of his career, Tomlinson scored nine in South Africa's first innings and did not bat in the second; in 10 overs of bowling, he failed to take a wicket and conceded 38 runs. After this Test match, Tomlinson fell so far out of favour that he was picked for only one match in the following six weeks. On the tour as a whole, he took 52 wickets at an average of 26.53, the most expensive of the regular bowlers, and his 282 runs came at an average of 20.14. On the way home from the tour, Tomlinson, like his captain, Jock Cameron, caught enteric fever; Tomlinson survived, though he was ill for a long time, but Cameron did not.

== Later cricket ==
Illness aside, Rhodesia's limited first-class programme included only two further matches for Tomlinson before the Second World War, both of them against the 1938–39 England team. After the war, however, Rhodesia re-entered the Currie Cup competition and Tomlinson played a full season in 1946–47 in which he took the best bowling figures of his career: six wickets for 56 runs in the match against Western Province. He continued to play in a few matches in 1947–48, but then retired.
