= David Lewis (Zimbabwean cricketer) =

Zimbabwean cricketer (1927–2013)

Personal information
- Born: 29 July 1927; Bulawayo, Southern Rhodesia
- Died: 19 January 2013 (aged 85); Johannesburg, South Africa
- Batting: Right-handed
- Bowling: Right-arm off-spin

Domestic team information
- Years: Team
- 1945/46–1963/64: Rhodesia
- 1949–1951: Oxford University

Career statistics
| Competition | First-class |
|---|---|
| Matches | 88 |
| Runs scored | 3,662 |
| Batting average | 28.16 |
| 100s/50s | 8/11 |
| Top score | 170* |
| Balls bowled | 1,209 |
| Wickets | 11 |
| Bowling average | 41.54 |
| 5 wickets in innings | 0 |
| 10 wickets in match | 0 |
| Best bowling | 2/19 |
| Catches/stumpings | 39/– |
- Source: CricketArchive, 12 January 2023

David John Lewis (27 July 1927 – 19 January 2013) was a Rhodesian first-class cricketer. His career lasted for over 20 years and the second half saw him captain the Rhodesian side which competed in the Currie Cup. He was one of the 1956 South African cricket annual cricketers of the year. He was born at Bulawayo, educated at Plumtree School, the University of Cape Town and Exeter College, Oxford, and died at Johannesburg.
