= Francis Slaven =

Zimbabwean cricketer

Personal information
- Full name: Francis Ferguson Slaven
- Born: 3 March 1931; Bulawayo, Matabeleland, Southern Rhodesia
- Died: September 2007 (aged 76); Bulawayo, Matabeleland, Zimbabwe
- Batting: Right-handed
- Relatives: Michael Slaven (brother)

Domestic team information
- Years: Team
- 1955: Oxford University

Career statistics
Competition	First-class
Matches	2
Runs scored	13
Batting average	6.50
100s/50s	–/–
Top score	13
Catches/stumpings	2/–
- Source: Cricinfo, 2 July 2020

Francis Ferguson Slaven (3 March 1931 – September 2007) was a Zimbabwean first-class cricketer and conveyancer.

Slaven was born at Bulawayo in Southern Rhodesia in March 1931. He later studied in England at Lincoln College at the University of Oxford as a Rhodes Scholar. While studying at Oxford, he made two appearances in first-class cricket for Oxford University against Gloucestershire and Lancashire at Oxford in 1955.

After graduating from Oxford, he returned to Southern Rhodesia where he became a conveyancer. Slaven died at Bulawayo in September 2007. His brother, Michael, also played first-class cricket.
