= Donald Davidson (cricketer) =

South African cricketer

Personal information
- Born: 19 September 1904; Cape Town, South Africa
- Died: 17 July 1985 (aged 80); East London, South Africa
- Source: Cricinfo, 6 December 2020

Donald Davidson (19 September 1904 – 17 July 1985) was a South African cricketer. He played in ten first-class matches from 1924/25 to 1936/37.
