= Jackie du Preez =

Rhodesian cricketer (1942–2020)

Personal information
- Full name: John Harcourt du Preez
- Born: 14 November 1942; Salisbury, Rhodesia
- Died: 8 April 2020 (aged 77); Harare, Zimbabwe
- Batting: Right-handed
- Bowling: Legbreak googly

International information
- National side: South Africa
- Test debut (cap 230): 3 February 1967 v Australia
- Last Test: 24 February 1967 v Australia

Career statistics
Competition	Test	FC	LA
Matches	2	120	20
Runs scored	0	4,063	160
Batting average	0.00	23.76	17.77
100s/50s	0/0	1/19	0/0
Top score	0	112	27
Balls bowled	144	18,104	658
Wickets	3	296	16
Bowling average	17.00	31.13	23.62
5 wickets in innings	0	11	1
10 wickets in match	0	1	0
Best bowling	2/22	8/92	5/42
Catches/stumpings	2/–	80/–	11/–
- Source: CricketArchive, 9 April 2020

John Harcourt "Jackie" du Preez (14 November 1942 – 8 April 2020) was a Rhodesian cricketer who played in two Test matches for South Africa against Australia in 1967.

A leg-spinner and useful lower-order batsman, he was educated at Prince Edward School and first played for Rhodesia aged 18 against New Zealand in Bulawayo in October, 1961. He represented Rhodesia a record 112 times before retiring in 1979.

Later he served as a national selector for Zimbabwe. Du Preez died on 8 April 2020 in Harare after suffering from a long-standing heart condition. He was 77.
