= Turk Mine =

Coordinates: 19°43′S 28°48′E

Turk Mine is a village in the province of Matabeleland North, Zimbabwe. It is located about 56 km north-east of Bulawayo. The village grew up around a gold mine of the same name and serves as an administrative centre for the surrounding mining and ranching area.

The Streak family, including Heath and Denis who both represented Zimbabwe in cricket, have been farming in the area for over a century. Denis Streak even created a cricket oval on his farm at Turk Mine.
