= Victor Robinson (lawyer) =

Southern Rhodesian lawyer (1899–1966)

Sir Victor Lloyd Robinson, CBE, QC (1899–1966) was a Southern Rhodesian lawyer. He was Solicitor-General of Southern Rhodesia from 1944 to 1949, Attorney-General of Southern Rhodesia from 1949 to 1954, and Attorney-General of the Federation of Rhodesia and Nyasaland from 1954 to 1959.

He was also a cricketer.
