= Xen Balaskas =

South African cricketer

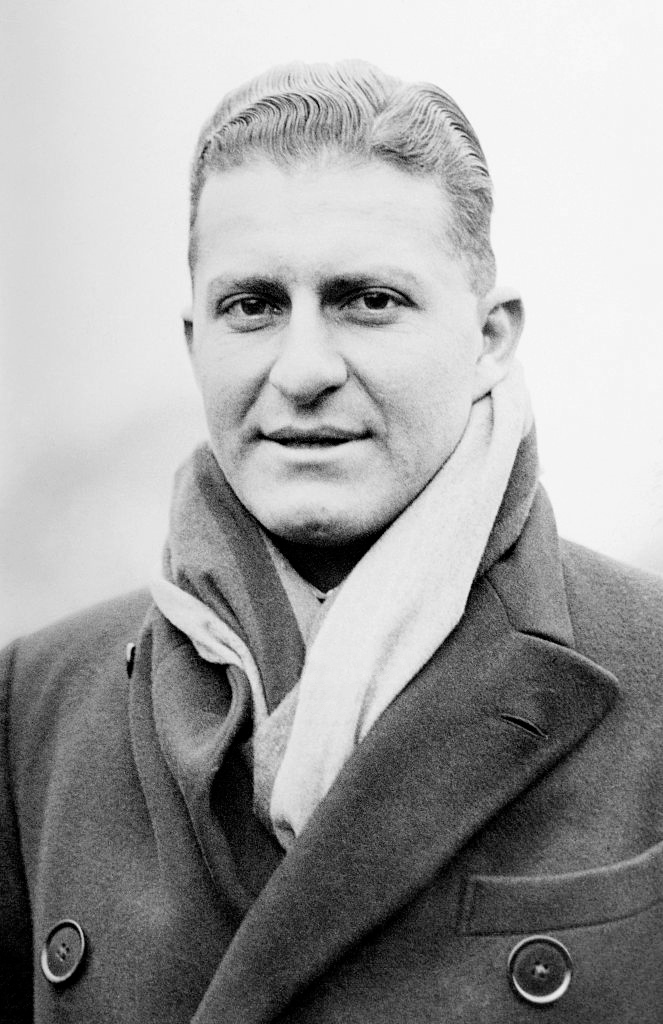
- Balaskas in about 1935

Personal information
- Full name: Xenophon Constantine Balaskas
- Born: 15 October 1910; Kimberley, Cape Province, South Africa
- Died: 12 May 1994 (aged 83); Hyde Park, Johannesburg, South Africa
- Nickname: Bally
- Batting: Right-handed
- Bowling: Right-arm leg break, googly
- Role: All-rounder

International information
- National side: South Africa
- Test debut (cap 132): 24 December 1930 v England
- Last Test: 31 December 1938 v England

Domestic team information
- Years: Team
- 1926/27–1932/33: Griqualand West
- 1933/34: Border
- 1934/35–1935/36: Western Province
- 1936/37–1946/47: Transvaal
- 1938/39: North Eastern Transvaal

Career statistics
Competition	Test	First-class
Matches	9	75
Runs scored	174	2,696
Batting average	14.50	28.86
100s/50s	1/0	6/12
Top score	122*	206
Balls bowled	1572	12,557
Wickets	22	276
Bowling average	36.63	24.11
5 wickets in innings	1	20
10 wickets in match	0	9
Best bowling	5/49	8/60
Catches/stumpings	5/–	47/–
- Source: CricketArchive, 29 January 2009

Xenophon Constantine Balaskas (15 October 1910 – 12 May 1994), sometimes known as Xen or Bally, was a South African cricketer. He was an all-rounder who went onto score 2,696 first-class cricket runs at 28.68 and went onto take 276 wickets at 24.11 with his crafty leg-spin bowling. He was the first test cricketer as well as the first international cricketer whose name started with the English alphabetical letter "X". He was also fondly nicknamed as the "Saxophone" by his teammates. He played a pivotal role in South Africa's historic first ever test win in English soil.

== Biography ==
He was born in Kimberley to Greek immigrant parents. His parents also apparently owned the first restaurant in the diamond town of Kimberley. He died in Hyde Park, Johannesburg at the age of 83.

== Career ==
Balaskas made his first-class debut for Griqualand West in 1926/27, but did not really break through until 1929/30. In that year he topped both the runs and wickets lists in the Currie Cup by taking 39 wickets at 21.20, including five five-wicket hauls, and scoring 644 runs at over 80, including a career-best 206 against Rhodesia.

The following season he made his Test match debut at Johannesburg's Old Wanderers ground, but made no impact, scoring 7 and 3 and bowling just two overs in the match. The second Test at Cape Town proved only slightly better: South Africa recorded an innings victory, but Balaskas made a duck and took 2–104 in the match; he was dropped for the rest of the series.

In 1931/32, he toured Australia and New Zealand with South Africa, but he only managed to get into the Test side only for the second leg of the tour, repaying the selectors with his only Test century, 122 not out at Wellington. His next Test appearances came in England in 1935 with the touring South African team, and it was there at Lord's (his only appearance of the series) that he produced the best bowling performance of his career, recording splendid analyses of 32–8–49–5 and 27–8–54–4 to help his country to their first Test victory on English soil. His record match winning spell of 9/103 propelled South Africa to register a convincing victory over England by a huge margin of 157 runs. He bowled a marathon spell consisting of 59 overs for the match tirelessly and with great accuracy from the Pavilion End at iconic Lord's Stadium, although the pitch offered assistance to bowlers due to the pitch conditions being ravaged by the leather jackets. It was considered a remarkable upset victory according to critics, and the victory is still regarded as one of the most shocking test match results to this date.

Balaskas took nine wickets in three Tests against Australia the following winter, and playing for Transvaal took 8–60 against Western Province in 1937/38, but there was to be only one further international appearance, against England at Cape Town in 1938/39, and a return of 0–115, together with the coming of World War II, sealed his fate as a Test cricketer. He resumed his domestic cricket career after the war, and enjoyed a fine 1945/46 season when he took 47 wickets at 15.95, but after a couple of matches the following year he hung up his bat for good. Balaskas has the third-lowest Test Match batting average of any player who has made a century, with 14.50.
