= Chris Duckworth =

Rhodesian cricketer

Personal information
- Full name: Christopher Anthony Russell Duckworth
- Born: 22 March 1933; Que Que, Southern Rhodesia
- Died: 16 May 2014 (aged 81); Johannesburg, South Africa
- Batting: Right-handed

International information
- National side: South Africa

Domestic team information
- Years: Team
- 1952-53–1953-54: Natal
- 1954-55–1962-63: Rhodesia

Career statistics
Competition	Tests	First-class
Matches	2	77
Runs scored	28	2572
Batting average	7.00	22.96
100s/50s	0/0	3/10
Top score	13	158
Balls bowled	-	-
Wickets	-	-
Bowling average	-	-
5 wickets in innings	-	-
10 wickets in match	-	-
Best bowling	-	-
Catches/stumpings	3/-	91/13
- Source: Cricinfo, 30 July 2019

Christopher Anthony Russell Duckworth (22 March 1933 – 16 May 2014) was a Rhodesian cricketer who played in two Tests for South Africa in 1957.

Duckworth was born in Que Que, Southern Rhodesia (now Kwekwe, Zimbabwe) and was educated at Chaplin High School and the University of Natal. He also played hockey for Rhodesia, rugby for Natal U19 and league tennis in Johannesburg.

Both of his Tests against England in the 1956–57 series were won by South Africa, the fourth at the Wanderers, Johannesburg, and the fifth at St George's Park, Port Elizabeth. Captain Clive van Ryneveld presented him with a commemorative stump at the conclusion of each contest.

In first-class cricket, Duckworth played two years from the 1952–1953 season for Natal while at University in Pietermaritzburg, scoring a century in his second match. In 1954–55 he returned to Rhodesia and in the mid-summer of 1963 was asked by the Rhodesian selectors to spearhead the National side, an honour he declined as he and his family were shortly due to emigrate to South Africa, where, in Johannesburg, at John Waite's invitation, he played for his Wanderers side in the 1965–66 season.

He was reserve wicketkeeper on two overseas tours, both to England, in 1955 and 1960, but was not picked for any of the Tests on either tour. He hit his highest first-class score, 158, against Northamptonshire on the 1955 tour. Jack Cheetham, captain of the 1955 tourists in his book I Declare wrote: "Duckworth played some beautiful innings, the one at Northampton possibly the most correct of the tour".

In the 33 matches he played for the South Africans, he was on the winning side 21 times, against only two losses. Both defeats occurred on the 1960 tour, once at Northampton after Duckworth had scored 51 not out in a second innings total of 101 for 7 before an adventurous declaration by Jackie McGlew, the other on a ghastly wicket at Bristol.
