= William Houghton (cricketer) =

Zimbabwean cricketer (born 1955)

William John Houghton (born 19 December 1955) is a Zimbabwean former cricketer, the older brother of David Houghton.
