= Percy Mansell =

Rhodesian cricketer (1920–1995)

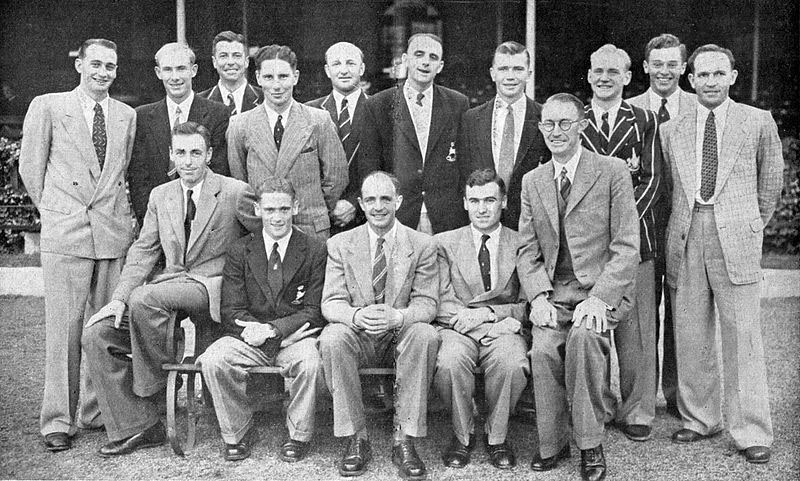
- The South African touring team in 1952–53. Mansell is seated at the right.

Personal information
- Full name: Percy Neville Frank Mansell
- Born: 16 March 1920; St George's, Shropshire, England
- Died: 9 May 1995 (aged 75); Somerset West, Cape Province, South Africa
- Batting: Right-handed
- Bowling: Leg-break googly

International information
- National side: South Africa

Career statistics
Competition	Tests	First-class
Matches	13	113
Runs scored	355	4598
Batting average	17.75	29.66
100s/50s	0/2	5/33
Top score	90	154
Balls bowled	1506	18176
Wickets	11	299
Bowling average	66.90	26.08
5 wickets in innings	0	21
10 wickets in match	0	5
Best bowling	3/58	7/43
Catches/stumpings	15/-	156/-
- Source: Cricinfo

Percy Neville Frank Mansell MBE (16 March 1920 – 9 May 1995) was a Rhodesian cricketer who played in thirteen Tests for South Africa from 1951 to 1955. Mansell was a bespectacled middle-order batsman, slips fieldsman, and leg-break and googly bowler who sometimes bowled medium-pace.

== Background ==
Born in England, Mansell moved to Bulawayo, Southern Rhodesia (now Zimbabwe) as an infant. He was educated at Milton High School and first played first-class cricket for Rhodesia at the age of 16 against Transvaal in 1936–37.

== Career ==
He represented Rhodesia 55 times before retiring after the 1961–62 season, having played his last match just before his 42nd birthday.

His best first-class bowling figures were 7 for 43 (13 for 120 in the match) in Rhodesia's two-run victory over the touring Surrey team in 1959–60. His two highest scores were 148 and 154, which he made in Rhodesia's two innings victories over Griqualand West in the B Section of the Currie Cup in 1955–56.

After retiring from the game he served as a cricket administrator in Rhodesia. He was awarded the MBE "for services to cricket in Southern Rhodesia" in the 1962 New Year Honours.
