= Hugh Martin (cricketer) =

South African cricketer (born 1947)

Personal information
- Born: 3 August 1947 (age 79); Enkeldoorn, Rhodesia
- Source: ESPNcricinfo, 7 January 2017

Hugh Martin (born 3 August 1947) is a South African cricketer. He played ten first-class matches for Transvaal B and New South Wales between 1970/71 and 1971/72.

== See also ==
- List of New South Wales representative cricketers
