= Arthur Tayfield =

South African cricketer (1931–2022)

Personal information
- Born: 21 June 1931; Durban, Natal, South Africa
- Died: 21 April 2022 (aged 90); Ballito, KwaZulu-Natal, South Africa
- Batting: Left-handed
- Bowling: Right-arm off-spin
- Relatives: Hugh Tayfield (brother)

Domestic team information
- Years: Team
- 1948-49 to 1949-50: Natal
- 1950-51 to 1951-52, 1953-54 to 1962-63: Transvaal
- 1952-53: North Eastern Transvaal

Career statistics
| Competition | First-class |
|---|---|
| Matches | 50 |
| Runs scored | 1483 |
| Batting average | 22.13 |
| 100s/50s | 2/4 |
| Top score | 205 |
| Balls bowled | 7283 |
| Wickets | 85 |
| Bowling average | 29.90 |
| 5 wickets in innings | 3 |
| 10 wickets in match | 1 |
| Best bowling | 6/75 |
| Catches/stumpings | 42/– |
- Source: Cricinfo, 5 December 2017

Arthur Tayfield (21 June 1931 – 21 April 2022) was a cricketer who played first-class cricket in South Africa from 1948 to 1963. He was the younger brother of the Test player Hugh Tayfield.

Arthur Tayfield was an off-spin bowler and a useful batsman who could bat at any position in the order. His best bowling figures came when he was playing for Transvaal against Natal in the Currie Cup in 1951–52, when he took 6 for 75 and 4 for 55. His highest score came ten years later when, opening the Transvaal innings against Eastern Province, he scored 205 in an innings victory.

In the Fourth Test of the 1956-57 series against England, fielding as a substitute for South Africa, he took a catch at long on off his brother Hugh's bowling to end the match and give South Africa victory by 17 runs.
