= Tony Pithey =

- Pithey (left) with his brother David

Personal information
- Born: 17 July 1933; Umtali, Southern Rhodesia
- Died: 17 November 2006 (aged 73); Southbroom, South Africa
- Batting: Right-handed
- Role: Batsman
- Relatives: David Pithey (brother)

International information
- National side: South Africa (1957–1965)
- Test debut (cap 195): 25 January 1957 v England
- Last Test: 12 February 1965 v England

Domestic team information
- Years: Team
- 1950/51–1968/69: Rhodesia
- 1955/56–1957/58: Western Province

Career statistics
Competition	Test	FC
Matches	17	124
Runs scored	819	7,073
Batting average	31.50	35.90
100s/50s	1/4	13/41
Top score	154	170
Balls bowled	12	22
Wickets	0	0
Bowling average	–	–
5 wickets in innings	–	–
10 wickets in match	–	–
Best bowling	–	–
Catches/stumpings	3/–	59/–
- Source: Cricinfo, 11 August 2021

Anthony John Pithey (17 July 1933 – 17 November 2006) was a Rhodesian cricketer who played in seventeen Test matches for South Africa between 1957 and 1965. He also made 65 appearances for Rhodesia, captaining them 34 times.

Pithey was a technically correct top-order batsmen who developed a reputation for being a stayer rather than a stroke-maker. His early promise saw him represent South Africa as a young player, but he only secured his place in the team toward the end of his career. He toured Australia with Trevor Goddard's Springboks in 1963–64, during which, with his brother David and the Pollocks (Peter and Graeme) he formed part of the first pair of brothers to represent a country in a Test match.

His best series was against Mike Smith's MCC tourists in 1964/65 during which he scored two half-centuries, and his only century, 154 at Newlands during the third Test match. He was selected for the tour of England in 1965 but withdrew for business reasons and did not play Test cricket again.
