= Hugh Tayfield =

South African cricketer

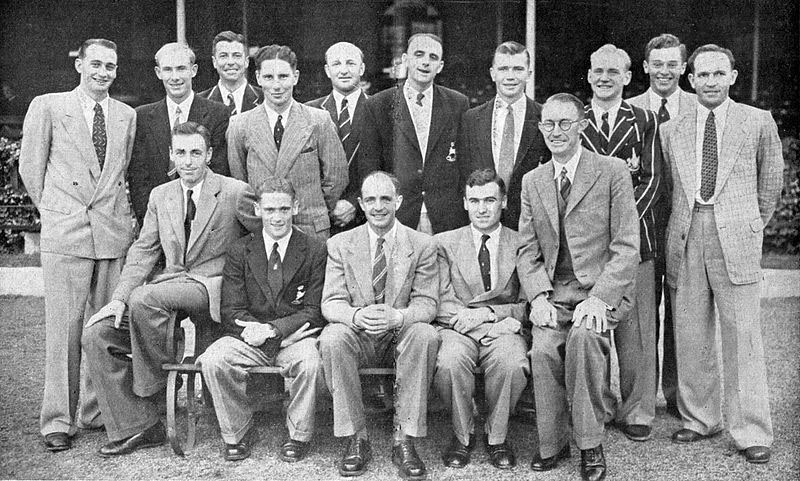
- The South African touring team in 1952–53. Tayfield is standing at the far left.

Personal information
- Full name: Hugh Joseph Tayfield
- Born: 30 January 1929; Durban, Natal Province, Union of South Africa
- Died: 24 February 1994 (aged 65); Hillcrest, Natal Province, South Africa
- Nickname: Toey
- Batting: Right-handed
- Bowling: Right-arm offbreak

International information
- National side: South Africa
- Test debut: 24 December 1949 v Australia
- Last Test: 18 August 1960 v England

Career statistics
Competition	Test	First-class
Matches	37	187
Runs scored	862	3,668
Batting average	16.90	17.30
100s/50s	0/2	0/10
Top score	75	77
Balls bowled	13,568	54,848
Wickets	170	864
Bowling average	25.91	21.86
5 wickets in innings	14	67
10 wickets in match	2	16
Best bowling	9/113	9/113
Catches/stumpings	26/–	149/–
- Source: CricInfo, 3 March 2017

Hugh Joseph Tayfield (30 January 1929 – 24 February 1994) was a South African international cricketer. He played 37 Test matches for South Africa between 1949 and 1960 and was one of the best off spinners the game has seen. He was the fastest South African to take 100 wickets in Tests (in terms of matches played) until Dale Steyn claimed the record in March 2008. He was named as one of the Wisden Cricketers of the Year in 1956. He was known as 'Toey' due to his habit of stubbing his toes into the ground before every delivery. He would also kiss the badge on his cap before handing it to the umpire at the start of every over.

The Tayfields were a cricketing family; Hugh's uncle Sidney Martin played for Worcestershire County Cricket Club and his brothers Arthur and Cyril both played for the Transvaal cricket team, as did two cousins, Hugh Martin and Ian Tayfield.

Tayfield made his debut for Natal as a 17-year-old in 1945–46. He took a hat-trick against Transvaal aged 18 and, when Athol Rowan was injured, he was hurried into the South African Test side against Australia in 1949–50. He played in all five Tests and, on a sticky wicket at Durban, took seven wicket for 23 when Australia crashed from 31 for no wicket to 75 all out.

After a quiet tour to England in 1951 when he was called up as a substitute for Rowan, he became South Africa's mainstay in Australia in 1952–53 under Jack Cheetham. He claimed 30 wickets in the series, 13 of them at Melbourne, to secure South Africa's first win over Australia in 42 years. Tayfield returned to England with more success in 1955, taking 143 wickets on the tour and 26 in the series including nine in South Africa's victory at Headingley. In the defeat at the Oval, the match which decided the rubber, he took five wickets for 60 runs in 53.3 overs.

Bowling for South Africa against England at Durban in 1956–57, he bowled 119 balls in England's first innings followed immediately by a further 18 in the second without conceding a run, a Test and first-class cricket record. He bowled over the wicket, close to the stumps, drifting the ball away from the bat in the air and then spinning it back through the gate. He did not spin the ball as much as England's Jim Laker but was unerringly accurate and could bowl for long spells. He set himself aggressive fields, in contrast to his steady bowling, with two silly mid ons for the snick prompted by a botched drive through the tempting hole he'd left at cover. He formed a fine partnership with Trevor Goddard and, backed by South Africa's athletic fielding, took 37 wickets at a bowling average of 17.18 runs per wicket against England in the 1956–57 series. He took nine for 113 in the second innings of the Fourth Test at Johannesburg, bowling unchanged on the last day, and was carried off the field by his teammates. Tayfield caught the only batsman he didn't dismiss.

In England in 1960 he took 123 wickets on the tour but failed in the Tests and, his career on the wane, lost his place in 1961–62. He was married and divorced five times.

Tayfield died in a hospital at Durban on 25 February 1994, at the age of 65.
