= Paul Bourdillon =

Zimbabwean cricketer (born 1964)

Personal information
- Born: 12 November 1964 (age 62); Umtali, Zimbabwe
- Source: ESPNcricinfo, 22 February 2017

Paul Bourdillon (born 12 November 1964) is a Zimbabwean cricketer. He played two first-class matches for Mashonaland in 1993/94.

== See also ==
- List of Mashonaland first-class cricketers
