= Rhodesia cricket team =

Cricket team

Rhodesia

Team information
- Established: 1898
- Last match: 1980

History
- First-class debut: Transvaal in 1905 at Old Wanderers

International Cricket Council
- ICC status: as Zimbabwe (1981)
- ICC region: Africa

The Rhodesia cricket team played first-class cricket and represented originally the British colony of Southern Rhodesia and later the unilaterally independent state of Rhodesia which became Zimbabwe. In 1980 the Rhodesia cricket team was renamed as the Zimbabwe-Rhodesia cricket team, and in 1981 it adopted its current name of the Zimbabwe national cricket team.

== Honours ==
- Currie Cup (0) –
- Gillette/Nissan Cup (1) – 1977–78

== Club history ==
The Rhodesian Cricket Union was formed in 1898 as the governing body of the game in the colony. Rhodesia competed in South Africa's Currie Cup championship from 1905, but its appearances were sporadic at first. Having lost their inaugural match to Transvaal by an innings and 170 runs, Rhodesia did not play in the Currie Cup again until 1929–30. They also played in 1931–32, winning four out of five matches, but losing the cup to Western Province under the points system then in use. The Rhodesian team then did not return until 1946–47, after which they at last played regularly. The Rhodesian team toured other areas of Africa. In 1951 they toured their northern neighbours East Africa.

Rhodesia was visited by a New Zealand team at the start of their tour of South Africa in October 1961. They played two three day first-class games against Rhodesia, the first in Bulawayo and the second in Sailsbury. Both matches ended in draws.

A total of 242 cricketers represented Rhodesia with noted Rhodesian players including Denis Tomlinson, Chris Duckworth, Tony Pithey, David Pithey, Jackie du Preez, Joe Partridge, Godfrey Lawrence and Colin Bland. These were the only Rhodesian born cricketers to represent South Africa, together with Shropshire-born Percy Mansell and the South Africans Paul Winslow, Mike Procter, Peter Carlstein and Egyptian-born John Traicos but the team never won the Currie Cup. The team played in 1979–80 as "Zimbabwe-Rhodesia" and left the competition for good at the close of that season, after Zimbabwe officially became independent.

Rhodesian players were eligible to represent South Africa in Test cricket until the country became Zimbabwe.

== Venues ==
Rhodesian venues included:

- Queens Sports Club, Bulawayo (March 1910 – present):
- Salisbury Sports Club (March 1910 – present): Mashonaland venue since 1954
- Raylton Club, Bulawayo (occasional venue Dec 1924 – Feb. 1955)
- Old Hararians A Field, Salisbury (used once in March 1950)
- Bulawayo Athletic Club (used once in Nov 1951): a Matabeleland venue since 1994
- Police A Ground, Salisbury (Oct 1957 – Dec 1968)
- Police B Ground, Salisbury (Nov 1969 – Jan 1980)
