= List of KwaZulu-Natal representative cricketers =

This is a list of cricketers who have played first-class, List A cricket, or Twenty20 cricket for Natal and KwaZulu-Natal in South Africa. The team was renamed ahead of the 1998–99 season following the renaming of Natal province as KwaZulu-Natal in 1994. From the 2019–20 season, the team is sometimes referred to as KwaZulu-Natal Coastal to distinguish it from KwaZulu-Natal Inland which had been created as a separate team with first-class status within the province ahead of the 2006–07 season.

The Natal team which toured Cape Colony in 1889–90 played in the first five provincial matches in South Africa to be considered to hold first-class status. (Note: Two Test matches played the previous season between South Africa and a touring English team are considered the first matches played in South Africa to have first-class status.) The team joined the Currie Cup competition in 1894–95, the fourth season in which the competition had taken place, and from that date the matches it played in the competition are considered first-class. The Natal B team joined the Currie Cup B section in 1965–66, and matches involving the B team are considered first-class in the competition. Following the renaming of Natal as KwaZulu-Natal, the B section competition continued for a single season as a first-class competition, with KwaZulu-Natal B taking part.

Natal first played List A cricket in 1970–71, the first season of provincial List A cricket in South Africa. (Note: The 1969–70 Gillette Cup competition had taken place the previous season, but teams did not use their provincial names. The team that played at Durban, the home of Natal, was organised by Colin Wesley and known as C Wesley's XI. It played three matches. All 13 players who appeared for this team also played matches for Natal so, by default, appear on this list.) KwaZulu-Natal first played domestic Twenty20 cricket in the first season of the CSA Provincial T20 in 2011–12.

This list includes the players who played first-class and List A cricket for Natal and Natal B between 1889–90 and 1997–98, and those who played first-class, List A, and Twenty20 cricket for KwaZulu-Natal, KwaZulu-Natal B, and KwaZulu-Natal Coastal from 1998–99 to the present day. (Note: A Natal XI played a single first-class match against the touring England Test team at Pietermaritzburg in February 1949. All 11 players who appeared the team also appeared in first-class matches for Natal, so by default each of those players is included in this list. Natal played twice against the tourists during the same season, both matches being played at Durban, the second of which took place immediately after the Natal XI match.) It does not include players who appeared only for KwaZulu-Natal Inland, which is considered a separate team, or those who appeared only for franchise team Dolphins which was operated by the KwaZulu-Natal Cricket Union between 2003–04 and 2020–21. (Note: These players are listed at List of Dolphins cricketers.) Nor does it include the cricketers who played for the Natal team in 108 first-class Howa Bowl matches organised by the South African Cricket Board. (Note: These matches were organised by a different board of control under the apartheid system in South Africa. They were intended to be played by non-white players and were not seen as first-class until a retrospective ruling by the United Cricket Board.)

As of 8 July 2025

== A ==
- Kyle Abbott
- Yusuf Abdulla
- Zahir Abrahim
- HD Ackerman
- Hylton Ackerman
- Marques Ackerman
- Shaun Adam
- Neil Adcock
- Lewis Addison
- Keagan Africa
- Mark Airey
- Peter Albers
- Craig Alexander
- Jan Alexander
- Michael Alexander
- Peter Allan
- Richard Allen
- Hartley Alleyne
- Richard Almond
- Ahmed Amla
- Hashim Amla
- Gilbert Anderson
- Ian Anderson
- John Anderson
- Mark Angel
- Royden Arbuckle
- Eric Arbuthnot
- Basil Armitage
- Robbie Armstrong
- John Arnold
- Alfred Atfield
- John Atkinson
- Ian Ault

== B ==
- Ottniel Baartman
- Mehmood Badat
- Eldine Baptiste
- Bradley Barnes
- Alan Barrow
- Grant Bashford
- Jonathan Bastow
- Ernest Beckwith
- Martin Bekker
- John Bell-Smyth
- Noel Bellville
- Kyle Bender
- John Beningfield
- Wilfred Beningfield
- Brett Benkenstein
- Boyd Benkenstein
- Dale Benkenstein
- Martin Benkenstein
- David Bense
- Robert Bentley
- Albert Berry
- Darryl Bestall
- Deane Bestall
- Fawcett Bestall
- McGregor Billing
- Albert Bircher
- John Bisset
- Sahil Bissoon
- Rupert Blake
- Jimmy Blanckenberg
- Yunus Bobat
- Gulam Bodi
- Warren Bond
- Tim Boon
- Allen Boonzaaier
- Matthew Boote
- Albert Borland
- Eathan Bosch
- Tertius Bosch
- Loots Bosman
- Albert Bosomworth
- Ant Botha
- Chad Bowes
- Mark Bowman
- George Boyes
- Harry Boyes
- John Bristow
- Edward Brooke
- Shaun Broughton
- Duncan Brown
- Walter Brunton
- André Bruyns
- Mark Bruyns
- Kyle Buckthorp
- John Budgen
- Christopher Burger
- Colin Burnill
- Ernest Burrill
- JC Burton (Note: Burton played five first-class matches for Natal, three in 1893–94 and two in 1896–97, scoring a total of 118 runs. His highest score of 60 was made against Griqualand West on his first-class debut at Newlands in March 1894. He is known to have played other matches at Pietermaritzburg during the 1890s, but other than a surname and initials no biographical details are known.)
- Jon Buxton-Forman

== C ==
- Rikki Cameron
- Blayde Capell
- Peter Carlstein
- Barry Carr
- Claude Carter
- Colin Casalis
- Bob Catterall
- Banele Cele
- Khalipha Cele
- Okuhle Cele
- Edward Challenor
- Horace Chapman
- Robin Cheesman
- Robert Cheetham
- Samuel Cheetham
- Jesse Chellan
- Cody Chetty
- Kemeshin Chetty
- Anley Chinnappa
- Michael Clare
- Paddy Clift
- Achille Cloete
- Charles Cohen
- John Cole
- George Collins
- Ramsay Collins
- Ronald Collins
- Peter Comrie
- Dalton Conyngham
- Jonathan Cooke
- Bertram Cooley
- Ken Cooper
- Christopher Copland
- Raymond Copland
- Peter Corbett
- Gavin Cowley
- Joe Cox
- Thomas Cradock
- Frank Fairbairn Crawford
- Ruan Cronje
- Derek Crookes
- Norman Crookes
- Fabian Crowie
- Kevin Curran

== D ==
- Mohamed Dada
- Eric Dalton
- George Dalton
- Howard Dalton
- Leonard Dalton
- Hugo Dammann
- Athol Dand
- Neville Daniels
- Darnton Davey
- James Davidson
- Melvyn Davies
- Richard Davies
- Thomas Davis
- Kevin Dawson
- Ossie Dawson
- Pierre de Bruyn
- Henry Deane
- Nummy Deane
- Ian de Gersigny
- Xavier de Gersigny
- Ruan de Swardt
- Andrew Delport
- Cameron Delport
- Ronald de Villiers
- Rudi de Vry
- Patrick Dewes
- Graham Dilley
- Derryck Dinkelman
- Tshepang Dithole
- Ian Dixon
- Sean Dixon
- Lucky Dladla
- Nhlanhla Dlamini
- Peter Dodds
- Kurt Donaldson
- Dereck Dowling
- Henry Dowling
- John Drew
- Jan Dreyer
- John Driffill
- Chris Duckworth
- Keith Dudgeon
- Richard Dumbrill
- Daryn Dupavillon
- David Dyer
- Dennis Dyer
- Graham Dyer

== E ==
- Eric Eaglestone
- John Easterbrook
- Ismail Ebrahim
- Keagan Eccles
- Kim Elgie
- John Ellis
- Rabian Engelbrecht
- Michael Erlank
- Sarel Erwee
- Tahir Essack
- Thomas Etlinger

== F ==
- Rodney Falkson
- Harold Fawcett
- Desmond Fell
- Herbert Fellows-Smith
- Luther Field
- Frank Findlay
- Harry Finlayson
- Calvin Flowers
- Graham Ford
- Andrew Forde
- Keith Forde
- Charles Forder
- Chad Fortune
- Arthur Foster
- Greg Fotheringham
- Henry Fotheringham
- William Franklin
- Quinton Friend
- Robert Frylinck
- Leslie Fuhri
- Daelen Fynn
- Warrick Fynn

== G ==
- William Gadsden
- Dennis Gamsy
- Brian Gessner
- Robert Getkate
- Philip Geyer
- Clive Gie
- Gary Gilder
- Sean Gilson
- Rivash Gobind
- Viyash Gobind
- Philip Goble
- Trevor Goddard
- Udo Goedeke
- Rick Gouveia
- John Govan
- Darren Govender
- Nashen Govender
- Ugasen Govender
- Paul Gray
- Frank Greaves
- Geoff Griffin
- Ola Grinaker
- Craig Grinyer
- Ulric Groom
- Bruce Groves
- Terence Groves
- Khwezi Gumede

== H ==
- Anthony Hall
- Malcolm Hall
- Michael Hall
- Clive Halse
- James Hamilton
- Cecil Hand
- Mark Handman
- Brian Hardie
- Victor Harrison
- Geoffrey Hart-Davis
- Miles Harvey
- Neil Harvey
- Robert D Harvey
- Robert L Harvey
- Timothy Harvey
- Chad Hauptfleisch
- Warryn Hauptfleisch
- Grayson Heath
- Percy Heather
- Mark Hedley
- John Henderson
- Robert Henderson
- Charles Henwood
- Pelham Henwood
- Victor Henwood
- Rubin Hermann
- Nicolas Hewer
- Douglas Hewitt
- Forrest Hill
- Arthur Hime
- Charles Hime
- Maurice Hime
- Allister Hipkin
- Bongwa Hlongwane
- Ian Hobson
- Mackie Hobson
- Evan Hodkinson
- Grant Hodnett
- Kyle Hodnett
- Peter Holman
- Michael Holmes
- Stanley Hooper
- Daniel Horsfall
- Keith Hosken
- Neil Hosken
- Robert Howden
- John Howes
- Andrew Hudson
- Bruce Hughes
- Edward Hughes
- Kim Hughes
- Matt Hulett
- Graeme Hurlbatt
- Reginald Hurt
- Philip Hutchinson

== I ==
- Richard Illingworth
- Clinton Inglis
- Robert Ireland
- Lee Irvine

== J ==
- Nazeer Jaffar
- Brian Jerome
- Neil Johnson
- Alan Jones
- Neill Jordaan

== K ==
- Yves Kamanzi
- Jack Kaplan
- John Kasper
- Gareth Katz
- Gerald Katz
- Headley Keith
- Gus Kempis
- Jon Kent
- Herbert Keppler
- Bruce Kerr
- Faeez Khan
- Imraan Khan
- Thamsanqa Khumalo
- Simon Kimber
- Albert King
- Billy King
- Collis King
- Derek King
- Guy King
- Aleeshen Kisten
- Craig Kirsten
- Kushen Kishun
- Lance Klusener
- John Knott
- Hylton Knowles
- Lloyd Koch
- Tyron Koen
- Geoffrey Kotze
- Bruce Kruger

== L ==
- Jason Lacon-Allan
- Jock Lamb
- Anthony Lambert
- Richard Lambert
- Clarence Lamble
- Hugh Lamond
- Mervyn Lang
- George Law
- Godfrey Lawrence
- Fabian Lazarus
- Walter Lee
- John Lever
- Leo Lewin
- Aubrey Lilley
- Christopher Lister-James
- Grant Lister-James
- Charlie Llewellyn
- Brett Logan
- Kenneth Logan
- Mark Logan
- Wayne Lombard
- Craig Lowe
- Cecil Lowell
- Tristan Luus
- Rowan Lyle
- Peter Lyons

== M ==
- Cedric Mabuya
- Bruce McBride
- Cuan McCarthy
- Rod McCurdy
- Duncan McDonald
- Neville McDonald
- Trevor Macdonald
- George Macfarlane
- Richard McGlashan
- Jackie McGlew
- Stuart Mackenzie
- Henry Mackrory
- Justin Mackrory
- Nixon McLean
- Roy McLean
- Don MacLeod
- Robbie MacQueen
- Peter Madden
- Michael Madsen
- Trevor Madsen
- Wayne Madsen
- Keshav Maharaj
- Sibonelo Makhanya
- Michael Makin
- Rodney Malamba
- Ashraf Mall
- Tufty Mann
- Henry Mansell
- Athi Maposa
- Peter Marais
- Fish Markham
- Neville Markham
- Malcolm Marshall
- Kevin Martin
- Richard Martin
- Sidney Martin
- Jeffrey Mathews
- Michael Mathews
- Neville Matthews
- Allan Mellor
- Michael Mellor
- Alan Melville
- Njabulo Mgenge
- David Miller
- Duncan Miller
- Frank Miller
- Geoff Miller
- Neil Minnaar
- Riaan Minnie
- Emmanuel Mkhize
- Saidi Mlongo
- Hlompho Modimokoane
- Odirile Modimokoane
- Robert Moir
- Andile Mokgakane
- Nqobani Mokoena
- Matt Montgomery
- Sagren Moodley
- Barry Moody
- Grahame Morby-Smith
- Lynton Morby-Smith
- Tshepo Moreki
- Douglas Morgan
- Harry Morley
- Edward Morris
- Frank Morris
- Gavin Morris
- Eric Mowat
- Nhlakanipho Mpungose
- Wonder Mtolo
- John Muil
- Claude Mulcahy
- Kerwin Mungroo
- Douglas Murdoch
- Archibald Murray
- Senuran Muthusamy
- Ayavuya Myoli

== N ==
- Keegan Nagan
- Theesan Naicker
- Pranesh Naidoo
- David Napier
- Brandon Nash
- Anderson Ndovela
- Jeremy Nel
- Thula Ngcobo
- Smangaliso Nhlebela
- Ravenor Nicholson
- Delroy Nicol
- John Nicolson
- Richard Nienaber
- David Norman
- Dave Nourse
- Dudley Nourse
- Lifa Ntanzi
- Thando Ntini

== O ==
- John O'Donoghue
- Francis O'Flaherty
- Terence O'Flaherty
- Jason Oakes
- Greg Oldfield
- Yacoob Omar
- Dave Orchard
- Eric Orchard
- Kenneth Orchard

== P ==
- Trevor Packer
- Fred Palmer
- Paul Parker
- Wilfred Parry
- Bryce Parsons
- Edward Parsons
- Michael Parsons
- Nigel Parsons
- Zakariya Paruk
- Denis Pascal
- Michael Patchitt
- Zain Patel
- Colin Paterson
- Dane Paterson
- Bill Payn
- Guy Payn
- James Payn
- Leslie Payn
- Roland Pearce
- David Pearse
- Dudley Pearse
- Mark Pearse
- Ormerod Pearse
- Vyvyan Pearse
- Maurice Pennington
- Keegan Petersen
- Andile Phehlukwayo
- David Phillips
- Kevin Pietersen
- Myren Pillay
- Romashan Pillay
- Tyron Pillay
- Anthony Pistorius
- Ivan Pistorius
- David Pithey
- John Piton
- Jack Plimsoll
- Bruce Plummer
- Matthew Pollard
- Shaun Pollock
- Ian Pont
- Bradley Porteous
- Nikhil Prem
- Anthony Procter
- Mike Procter
- Brett Proctor
- Malcolm Proctor
- David Pryke

== Q ==
- Zakhele Qwabe

== R ==
- Waseem Rahman
- Shahil Ramdin
- Naveen Ramnarain
- Mishkal Ramsaroop
- John Randles
- Paul Randles
- Peter Rawson
- John Rayner
- Paul Rayner
- Abdul Razak
- Desigan Reddy
- Gavin Reddy
- Ravi Reddy
- Hugh Reece-Edwards
- Ryan Reeves
- Alston Rennie
- Clinton Rhodes
- Jonty Rhodes
- Clive Rice
- Michael Ric-Hansen
- Barry Richards
- Johnny Riekert
- Jameson Riddell
- Marshall Riddell
- Arthur Risley
- Frederick Roach
- Victor Robbins
- Trevor Roberts
- Arthur W. Robinson (Note: CricketArchive lists this player as Albert William Robinson. CricInfo and The Association of Cricket Statisticians and Historians list him as Alfred W Robinson.)
- Cyril Robinson
- Kevin Robinson
- Leo Robinson
- Gareth Roderick
- Grant Roelofsen
- Russell Rose
- Grant Rowley

== S ==
- Mario Saliwa
- Sivert Samuelson
- Mark Sanders
- Hugh Saulez
- Calvin Savage
- Clifford Saville
- Patrick Schultz
- Derek Scotney
- Daryl Scott
- Gareth Scott
- Brandon Scullard
- Phillimon Selowa
- Mafinki Serame
- Roger Seymour
- Tabraiz Shamsi
- James Sheard
- Mthokozisi Shezi
- Arthur Short
- Jack Siedle
- John Siedle
- Karl Siedle
- Andile Simelane
- Kyle Simmonds
- Shaun Simpson
- Daniel Sincuba
- Yadene Singh
- Angus Small
- Daryn Smit
- Jesse Smit
- Kyle Smit
- Aubrey Smith
- Chris Smith
- EJ Smith (Note: A left-arm bowler who played four of the first five first-class matches Natal played in 1889–90. He took one wicket and scored 81 runs, including a half-century made against Kimberley. Other than a surname and initials no biographical details are known.)
- Francis Smith
- Gary Smith
- Ian Smith
- Jason Smith
- Malcolm Smith
- Paul Smith
- Robin A Smith
- Robin T Smith
- Tony Smith
- Michael Smithyman
- JJ Smuts
- Richard Snell
- Dudley Sparks
- Henry Sparks
- Victor Sparks
- Mark Springer
- Robert Spurway
- Patrick Stack
- John Stalker
- John Steele
- Edwin Stephenson
- John Stephenson
- Tony Steward
- Errol Stewart
- Richard Steyn
- Rudi Steyn
- Craig Stirk
- Keith Storey
- Phillip Stride
- Charles Stuart
- PW Sturgess (Note: Sturgess played a single match for Natal as a wicket-keeper in 1906–07. He scored 0 not out in his only innings and took two catches. Other than a surname and initials no biographical details are known.)
- Prenelan Subrayen
- Craig Sugden
- Charles Sullivan
- Sumanth Sunkari
- George Sweeney
- Junaid Syed
- Pat Symcox
- Russel Symcox

== T ==
- Henry Taberer
- George Tatham
- Craig Tatton
- Arthur Tayfield
- Hugh Tayfield
- Ian Tayfield
- Dan Taylor
- Daniel Taylor
- Henry Taylor
- Herbie Taylor
- Leonard Taylor
- Les Taylor
- David Thomas
- Malcolm Thompson
- Robert Thomson
- William Thomson
- Tony Tillim
- Derek Torlage
- Gary Tramontino
- Michael Tramontino
- Pat Trimborn
- Paul Trimborn
- Charles Trotter
- Lawrence Trotter
- Thomas Trotter
- Thandi Tshabalala
- Len Tuckett
- David Turner
- Douglas Turner
- Percy Turner
- Stuart Turner
- Clifford Tutton
- Andrew Tweedie

== U ==
- Arthur Upton

== V ==
- Jonathan Vandiar
- Vintcent van der Bijl
- Jared van Heerden
- Vaughn van Jaarsveld
- Slade van Staden
- Divan van Wyk
- Morné van Wyk
- Derek Varnals
- Rowan Varner
- Ross Veenstra
- Joel Veeran
- Grove Venter
- Kevin Verdoorn
- Peter Vermaak
- Berry Versfeld
- Andre Viljoen
- Hanu Viljoen
- Bert Vogler
- Hubert von Mengershausen

== W ==
- Billy Wade
- Herby Wade
- Jason Wagener
- Peter Wallace
- Greg Walsh
- Anthony Warman
- John Watkins
- Victor Watkins
- Doug Watson
- Colin Wesley
- Anthony Wessels
- Byron Whatmore
- Sean Whitehead
- Brian Whitfield
- Stuart Whittaker
- George Whyte
- Lindsay Whyte-Sweet
- Chris Wilkins
- Peter Williams
- Robert Williams
- Garry Wilson
- Robert Wilson
- Wade Wingfield
- Gareth Wissing
- Richard Wissing
- Atholl Wood
- Michael Woodburn
- Hugh Woodroffe
- Bobby Woods
- Charles Woods
- Craig Woods
- Bob Woolmer
- Arthur Wormington
- Maurice Wright
- Neville Wright
- Clive Wulfsohn

== X ==
- Victor Xulu

== Y ==
- Brendan Young
- Peter Young
- Robert Yuill

== Z ==
- Zahir Shah
- Linda Zondi
- Dudu Zondo
- Khayelihle Zondo
- Sithabiso Zungu
