= List of Dolphins cricketers =

This is a list of cricketers who played for the South African franchise Dolphins cricket team between the 2003–04 season and 2020–21. It includes the players who appeared for the team in first-class, List A and Twenty20 competitions during the period in which the team was a franchise.

During 2003, Cricket South Africa changed the way in which top-class domestic cricket in the country was organised. This created six franchise teams at the top level of domestic competition, combining the existing provincial teams to create an elite competition. The Dolphins franchise was formed by the KwaZulu-Natal cricket team, the only one of the six franchises to not involve combining existing teams. Initially the team competed in the 2003–04 CSA T20 Challenge, before the CSA 4-Day Domestic Series and CSA One-Day Cup also became franchise-only competitions the following season.

Ahead of the 2006–07 season, Cricket South Africa added five new first-class teams, one of which was KwaZulu-Natal Inland, effectively splitting the province of KwaZulu-Natal and creating a combined franchise. (Note: KwaZulu-Natal is sometimes referred to as KwaZulu-Natal Coastal in order to distinguish it from KwaZulu-Natal Inland.) During the period of franchise competitions, KwaZulu-Natal and KwaZulu-Natal Inland competed as separate cricket unions in the CSA 3-Day and One-Day Cups and CSA T20 competitions. The period of franchise competition lasted until the end of the 2020–21 season when Cricket South Africa reverted to a division based provincial competition, with both teams competing separately from the start of the 2021–22 season. Many of the senior provincial unions which had been involved in franchise competitions retained the names of their franchises as marketing tools. KwaZulu-Natal, the senior team in the Dolphins franchise, chose to do so and compete using the name Dolphins.

== A ==
- Kyle Abbott
- Yusuf Abdulla
- Zahir Abrahim
- HD Ackerman
- Marques Ackerman
- Glen Addicott
- Craig Alexander
- Ahmed Amla
- Hashim Amla

== B ==
- Ottniel Baartman
- Brady Barends
- Bradley Barnes
- Martin Bekker
- Dale Benkenstein
- Ravi Bopara
- Eathan Bosch
- Loots Bosman
- Dwayne Bravo
- Duncan Brown

== C ==
- Okuhle Cele
- Cody Chetty
- Kemeshin Chetty
- Devon Conway

== D ==
- Pierre de Bruyn
- Cameron Delport
- Ruan de Swardt
- Friedel de Wet
- Tshepang Dithole
- Keith Dudgeon
- Daryn Dupavillon

== E ==
- Keagan Eccles
- Fidel Edwards
- Rabian Engelbrecht
- Michael Erlank
- Sarel Erwee
- Tahir Essack

== F ==
- Chad Fortune
- Quinton Friend
- Robert Frylinck

== G ==
- Rivash Gobind
- Vyash Gobind
- Nashen Govender
- Ugasen Govender
- Mbasa Gqadushe

== H ==
- Andrew Hall
- Nantie Hayward
- Nicolas Hewer
- Matt Hulett
- Graham Hume

== I ==
- Imran Tahir

== J ==
- Sanath Jayasuriya

== K ==
- Jon Kent
- Imraan Khan
- Thamsanqa Khumalo
- Craig Kirsten
- Lance Klusener

== L ==
- Johann Louw
- Tristan Luus

== M ==
- Ryan McLaren
- Ross McMillan
- Wayne Madsen
- Keshav Maharaj
- Sibonelo Makhanya
- Ashraf Mall
- Athi Maposa
- David Miller
- Saidi Mlongo
- Andile Mogakane
- Tshepo Moreki
- Mangaliso Mosehle
- Brad Moses
- Kerwin Mungroo
- Senuran Muthusamy
- Ayavuya Myoli

== N ==
- Mfuneko Ngam
- Smangaliso Nhlebela
- Kyle Nipper
- Lifa Ntanzi

== O ==
- Jason Oakes
- Graham Onions

== P ==
- Zakariya Paruk
- Dane Paterson
- Keegan Petersen
- Andile Phehlukwayo
- Kevin Pietersen
- Ruan Pietersen
- Mathew Pillans
- Tyron Pillay
- Liam Plunkett
- Shaun Pollock

== R ==
- Abdul Razak
- Grant Roelofsen
- Grant Rowley

== S ==
- Calvin Savage
- Brandon Scullard
- Mafinki Serame
- Tabraiz Shamsi
- Mthokozisi Shezi
- Daniel Sincuba
- Yadene Singh
- Daryn Smit
- Kyle Smit
- Prenelan Subrayen
- Craig Sugden
- Russel Symcox

== T ==
- Alfonso Thomas
- Thandi Tshabalala
- Lonwabo Tsotsobe
- Andrew Tweedie

== V ==
- Jonathan Vandiar
- Vaughn van Jaarsveld
- Morné van Vuuren
- Divan van Wyk
- Morné van Wyk
- Dane Vilas

== W ==
- Doug Watson
- Wade Wingfield

== Y ==
- Yasir Arafat

== Z ==
- Khaya Zondo
- Lwandiswa Zuma
