= Champions Cup 2000–01 =

Cricket tournament in Australia

The Champions Cup was a limited overs cricket tournament played from 29 March 2001 to 4 April 2001 in Perth, Australia. It featured the four teams from Australia, South Africa, New Zealand and India who had won the domestic championship in their respective countries – Western Australia, KwaZulu-Natal, Central Districts and Mumbai.

== Competition ==
The competition was developed by the WACA and EventsCorp and was loosely based on the FIFA World Club Championship in football (soccer). The aim was to find the best one-day domestic cricket side in the world. Sanctioned by the International Cricket Council, it was anticipated to become a regular event and expand each year with additional cricket nations being represented. However, the popularity of the event did not take off and it was not held again in subsequent years.

== Teams ==
=== Central Districts ===
Craig Spearman (captain for game 1), Jacob Oram (captain for games 2 & 3), Mark Douglas, Bevan Griggs, Brent Hefford, Jamie How, David Kelly, Mathew Sinclair, Andrew Schwass, Ben Smith, Glen Sulzberger, Greg Todd, Ewen Thompson & Gareth West. Coach: Dipak Patel.

=== Kwa-Zulu Natal ===
Dale Benkenstein (captain), Ahmed Amla, Eldine Baptiste, Kyle Bender, Goolam Bodi, Mark Bruyns, Gary Gilder, Jon Kent, Ashraf Mall, Errol Stewart, Andrew Tweedie, Doug Watson & Wade Wingfield. Coach: Phil Russel.

=== Mumbai ===
Sameer Dighe (captain), Amol Muzumdar (vice-captain), Sairaj Bahutule, Amit Dani, Wasim Jaffer, Vinod Kambli, Shriram Kannan, Nilesh Kulkarni, Vinayak Mane, Paras Mhambrey, Robin Morris, Jatin Paranjpe, Ramesh Powar & Santosh Saxena. Coach: Ashok Mankad.

=== Western Australia ===
Justin Langer (captain), Simon Katich (vice-captain), Jo Angel, Ryan Campbell, Murray Goodwin, Kade Harvey, Brad Hogg, Michael Hussey, Marcus North, Duncan Spencer, Darren Wates, Brad Williams & Peter Worthington. Coach: Mike Veletta.

== Schedule and results ==
All matches were played at the WACA Ground in Perth, Western Australia. Two points were awarded for a victory, one for a tie or a no result and none for a loss.

- 29 March 2001 Central Districts v KwaZulu-Natal – KwaZulu-Natal won by 7 wickets
- 30 March 2001 Mumbai v Western Australia – Western Australia won by 7 wickets
- 31 March 2001 KwaZulu-Natal v Western Australia – Western Australia won by 81 runs
- 1 April 2001 KwaZulu-Natal v Mumbai – KwaZulu-Natal won by 6 wickets
- 2 April 2001 Central Districts v Mumbai – Central Districts won by 106 runs
- 3 April 2001 KwaZulu-Natal v Western Australia – Western Australia won by 108 runs
- 4 April 2001 Final – KwaZulu-Natal v Western Australia v – Western Australia won by 6 wickets

=== Points Table ===
Team	Pts	Pld	W	L	NR	T	NRR
Western Australia	6	3	3	0	0	0	+1.389
(South Africa) KwaZulu-Natal	4	3	2	1	0	0	-0.143
(New Zealand) Central Districts	2	3	1	2	0	0	-0.243
(India) Mumbai	0	3	0	3	0	0	-1.019

=== Final ===
The final game was played between the two top ranked teams as per the points table, Western Australia and KwaZulu-Natal. KwaZulu-Natal (8 for 243 in 50 overs) lost to Western Australia (4 for 244 in 49.1 overs) by 6 wickets.
