= 2016 Africa T20 Cup =

Africa T20 Cup
- Dates: 2 September – 1 October 2016
- Administrator: Cricket South Africa
- Cricket format: Twenty20
- Tournament format(s): Group stage, playoffs
- Host: South Africa
- Champions: Eastern Province (1st title)
- Runners-up: Northern Cape
- Participants: 16
- Matches: 27
- Most runs: Rassie van der Dussen (203)
- Most wickets: Sisanda Magala (12)
- Official website: Official Website

The 2016 Africa T20 Cup was the second edition of the Africa T20 Cup, a Twenty20 cricket tournament that was held in South Africa from 2 September to 1 October 2016, as a curtain-raiser to the 2016–17 South African domestic season. Organised by Cricket South Africa, it featured thirteen South African provincial teams, as well as the national sides of Kenya, Namibia and Zimbabwe.

The sixteen participating teams were split into four pools of four, with the teams from each pool playing all of their matches at one ground across a single weekend. Defending champions Northerns were drawn in Pool B.

In Pool C four of the six matches were abandoned due to rain. Under the rules of the tournament, all the matches in that group were declared null and void. An elimination draw was then conducted with the captains of each team in the group, with Zimbabwe progressing to the finals section of the cup.

The Recreation Ground in Oudtshoorn was chosen at the venue for the semi-finals and final.

Eastern Province won the tournament, beating Northern Cape by 31 runs in the final.

== Pool A ==
=== Squads ===
| (South Africa) KZN Inland | Namibia | (South Africa) Western Province | (South Africa) North West |
|---|---|---|---|
| Craig Alexander; Tshepang Dithole; Sarel Erwee; Mbasa Gqadushe; Graham Hume; Sohail Mahmoud; Kurtlyn Mannikam; Attie Maposa; Lefa Mosena; Kyle Nipper; Ruhan Pretorious; Mthokozisi Shezi; Vaughn van Jaarsveld | Stephan Baard; Sarel Burger; Gerhard Erasmus; Jan Frylinck; Zane Green; Zhivago Groenewald; Mika Mutumbe; Bernard Scholtz; Nicolaas Scholtz; JJ Smit; Gerrie Snyman; Craig Williams; Pikky Ya France | Sybrand Engelbrecht; Dayyaan Galiem; Shaheen Khan; Matthew Kleinveldt; George Linde; Pieter Malan; Aviwe Mgijima; Tshepo Moreki; Mpilo Njoloza; Emmanuel Sebareme; Jason Smith; Kyle Verreynne; Zubayr Hamza | Marques Ackerman; Brady Barends; Johannes Diseko; Bjorn Fortuin; Katleho Leokaoke; Wihan Lubbe; Andre Malan; Janneman Malan; Ayavuya Myoli; Kagiso Rapulana; Julian Soutter; Nicky van den Bergh; Rassie van der Dussen |

=== Points table ===
| Team | Pld | W | L | T | NR | Pts | NRR |
|---|---|---|---|---|---|---|---|
| (South Africa) North West | 3 | 3 | 0 | 0 | 0 | 13 | +1.511 |
| (South Africa) KwaZulu-Natal Inland | 3 | 1 | 2 | 0 | 0 | 5 | +0.353 |
| (South Africa) Western Province | 3 | 1 | 2 | 0 | 0 | 4 | –0.642 |
| Namibia | 3 | 1 | 2 | 0 | 0 | 4 | –1.168 |
Source: ESPNcricinfo

=== Fixtures ===
2 September
09:45
Scorecard

| Namibia; 137/9 (20 overs) | v | (South Africa) Western Province; 135/9 (20 overs) |

Namibia won by 2 runs
City Oval, Pietermaritzburg
Player of the match: JJ Smit (Namibia)

- Western Province won the toss and elected to field.
- Kyle Verreynne (Western Province) made his T20 debut.

2 September
13:15
Scorecard

| KwaZulu-Natal Inland (South Africa); 156/5 (20 overs) | v | (South Africa) North West; 160/4 (18.4 overs) |

North West won by 6 wickets
City Oval, Pietermaritzburg
Player of the match: Janneman Malan (North West)

- KwaZulu-Natal Inland won the toss and elected to bat.
- Lesego Senokwane (North West) made his T20 debut.

3 September
09:45
Scorecard

| Namibia; 132/8 (20 overs) | v | (South Africa) North West; 135/6 (19 overs) |

North West won by 4 wickets
City Oval, Pietermaritzburg

- Namibia won the toss and elected to bat.

3 September
13:15
Scorecard

| KwaZulu-Natal Inland (South Africa); 164/5 (20 overs) | v | (South Africa) Western Province; 165/1 (16.3 overs) |

Western Province won by 9 wickets
City Oval, Pietermaritzburg

- KwaZulu-Natal Inland won the toss and elected to bat.

4 September
09:45
Scorecard

| North West (South Africa); 191/3 (20 overs) | v | (South Africa) Western Province; 127 (19.5 overs) |

North West won by 64 runs
City Oval, Pietermaritzburg

- Western Province won the toss and elected to field.

4 September
13:15
Scorecard

| KwaZulu-Natal Inland (South Africa); 146/9 (20 overs) | v | Namibia; 84 (18 overs) |

KwaZulu-Natal Inland won by 62 runs
City Oval, Pietermaritzburg

- KwaZulu-Natal Inland won the toss and elected to bat.

== Pool B ==
=== Squads ===
| (South Africa) Northerns | (South Africa) South Western Districts | (South Africa) Northern Cape | Kenya |
|---|---|---|---|
| Ruben Claassen; Tony de Zorzi; Thomas Kaber; Lerato Kgoatle; Heinrich Klaasen; Victor Mahlangu; Aiden Markram; Rivaldo Moonsamy; Alfred Mothoa; Lungi Ngidi; Andrew Rasemene; Grant Thomson; Shaun von Berg | Siyabonga Booi; Jean du Plessis; Niel Hornbuckle; Jongile Kilani; Hanno Kotze; Brendon Louw; Christopher Marrow; Dane Paterson; Dane Piedt; Gurshwin Rabie; Nelson Setimani; Glenton Stuurman; Dane Vilas | Gerhardt Abrahams; Tumelo Bodibe; Aidan Brooker; Mbulelo Budaza; Cloete Buitendag; Werner Coetsee; Corné Dry; Patrick Kruger; Akhona Kula; Kagiso Mohale; Diego Rosier; Jacques Snyman; Aubrey Swanepoel | Dhiren Gondaria; Gurdeep Singh; Irfan Karim; Karan Kaul; Shem Ngoche; Alex Obanda; Collins Obuya; Nelson Odhiambo; Nehemiah Odhiambo; Lucas Oluoch; Elijah Otieno; Rushab Patel; Rakep Patel |

=== Points table ===
| Team | Pld | W | L | T | NR | Pts | NRR |
|---|---|---|---|---|---|---|---|
| (South Africa) Northern Cape | 3 | 2 | 0 | 0 | 1 | 11 | +3.446 |
| (South Africa) Northerns | 3 | 2 | 1 | 0 | 0 | 8 | +0.569 |
| Kenya | 3 | 1 | 2 | 0 | 0 | 4 | –2.117 |
| (South Africa) South Western Districts | 3 | 0 | 2 | 0 | 1 | 2 | –0.280 |
Source: ESPNcricinfo

=== Fixtures ===
16 September
09:45
Scorecard

| Northerns (South Africa); 164/6 (20 overs) | v | Kenya; 132/3 (20 overs) |

Northerns won by 32 runs
Recreation Ground, Oudtshoorn

- Kenya won the toss and elected to field.
- Andrew Rasemene and Tony de Zorzi (Northerns) both made their T20 debuts.

16 September
13:15
Scorecard

| Northern Cape (South Africa); 113/6 (14 overs) | v | (South Africa) South Western Districts |

No result
Recreation Ground, Oudtshoorn

- Northern Cape won the toss and elected to bat.
- Jacques Snyman (Northern Cape); Jean du Plessis and Nkululeko Serame (South Western Districts) all made their T20 debuts.

17 September
09:45
Scorecard

| Northerns (South Africa); 132/6 (14 overs) | v | (South Africa) Northern Cape; 121/2 (11 overs) |

Northern Cape won by 8 wickets (D/L)
Recreation Ground, Oudtshoorn

- Northern Cape won the toss and elected to field.

17 September
13:15
Scorecard

| South Western Districts (South Africa); 151/8 (20 overs) | v | Kenya; 152/9 (19.5 overs) |

Kenya won by 1 wicket
Recreation Ground, Oudtshoorn

- South Western Districts won the toss and elected to bat.

18 September
09:15
Scorecard

| Northern Cape (South Africa); 166/4 (20 overs) | v | Kenya; 69 (14.3 overs) |

Northern Cape won by 97 runs
Recreation Ground, Oudtshoorn

- Kenya won the toss and elected to field.

18 September
13:15
Scorecard

| Northerns (South Africa); 133/6 (20 overs) | v | (South Africa) South Western Districts; 124/6 (20 overs) |

Northerns won by 9 runs
Recreation Ground, Oudtshoorn

- Northerns won the toss and elected to bat.
- Mthobeli Bangindawo (South Western Districts) made his T20 debut.

== Pool C ==
=== Squads ===
| (South Africa) Border | (South Africa) Easterns | (South Africa) Free State | Zimbabwe |
|---|---|---|---|
| Clayton Bosch; Darryl Brown; Mkhululi Calana; Phaphama Fojela; Ayabulela Gqamane; Simon Harmer; Christiaan Jonker; Gionne Koopman; Mncedisi Malika; Sesona Ndwandwa; Jerry Nqolo; Somila Seyibokwe; Yaseen Vallie | Matthew Arnold; Clayton August; Wesley Coulentianos; Junior Dala; Justin Gamble; Ernest Kemm; Xolani Mahlaba; Wesley Marshall; Sizwe Masondo; Grant Mokoena; Tabraiz Shamsi; Malusi Siboto; Tumelo Simelane; Daniel Sincuba | Khalipha Cele; Leus du Plooy; Dillon du Preez; Michael Erlank; Andries Gous; Sammy Mofokeng; Tshepo Ntuli; Romano Terblanche; Pite van Biljon; Shadley van Schalkwyk; Raynard van Tonder; Sean Whitehead; Lwandiswa Zuma | George Banda; Bothwell Chapungu; Brian Chari; Jeremy Ives; Malcolm Lake; Tendai Maruma; Shingirai Masakadza; Wellington Masakadza; William Mashinge; Brandon Mavuta; Peter Moor; Ryan Murray; Richard Ngarava |

=== Points table ===
With four of the games being abandoned, an elimination draw was done with Zimbabwe progressing to the finals stage.

=== Fixtures ===
9 September
12:45
Scorecard

| Zimbabwe; 149/8 (20 overs) | v | (South Africa) Free State; 153/3 (18.1 overs) |

Free State won by 7 wickets
Buffalo Park, East London

- Zimbabwe won the toss and elected to bat.
- Sean Whitehead (Free State); George Banda, Jeremy Ives, Rugare Magarira, William Mashinge, Ryan Murray and Richard Ngarava (Zimbabwe) all made their T20 debuts.

9 September
16:30
Scorecard

| Easterns (South Africa); 124/6 (20 overs) | v | (South Africa) Border; 129/2 (15.1 overs) |

Border won by 8 wickets
Buffalo Park, East London

- Border won the toss and elected to field
- Justin Gamble and Xolani Mahlaba (Easterns) both made their T20 debuts.

10 September
12:45
Scorecard

| Free State (South Africa) | v | (South Africa) Easterns |

Match abandoned
Buffalo Park, East London

- No toss.

10 September
16:30
Scorecard

| Border (South Africa) | v | Zimbabwe |

Match abandoned
Buffalo Park, East London

- No toss.

11 September
09:45
Scorecard

| Zimbabwe | v | (South Africa) Easterns |

Match abandoned
Buffalo Park, East London

- No toss.

11 September
13:15
Scorecard

| Border (South Africa) | v | (South Africa) Free State |

Match abandoned
Buffalo Park, East London

- No toss.

== Pool D ==
=== Squads ===
| (South Africa) Gauteng | (South Africa) Eastern Province | (South Africa) Boland | (South Africa) KwaZulu-Natal |
|---|---|---|---|
| Brian Barnard; Nandre Burger; Devon Conway; Yassar Cook; Keith Dudgeon; Eddie Leie; Carmi le Roux; Mangaliso Mosehle; Ndumiso Mvelase; Shaylen Pillay; Nono Pongolo; Delano Potgieter; Farhaan Sayanvala | Colin Ackermann; Tladi Bokako; Mathew Christensen; Junaid Dawood; Brad Dolley; Clyde Fortuin; Sisanda Magala; Edward Moore; Anrich Nortje; Solo Nqweni; Onke Nyaku; JJ Smuts; Kelly Smuts | Ziyaad Abrahams; Ferisco Adams; Niel Botha; Justin Dill; Simon Khomari; Sinegugu Maseko; Justin Ontong; Keegan Petersen; Soyisile Pono; Kyle Simmonds; Cebo Tshiki; Stiaan van Zyl; Lizaad Williams | Okuhle Cele; Cameron Delport; Rabian Engelbrecht; Robbie Frylinck; Bruce Kerr; Keshav Maharaj; Sibonelo Makhanya; Senuran Muthusamy; Smangaliso Nhlebela; Jason Oakes; Mishkal Ramsaroop; Jesse Smit; Dudu Zondo |

=== Points table ===
| Team | Pld | W | L | T | NR | Pts | NRR |
|---|---|---|---|---|---|---|---|
| (South Africa) Eastern Province | 3 | 3 | 0 | 0 | 0 | 13 | +1.210 |
| (South Africa) Gauteng | 3 | 2 | 1 | 0 | 0 | 9 | +0.715 |
| (South Africa) Boland | 3 | 1 | 2 | 0 | 0 | 4 | –0.240 |
| (South Africa) KwaZulu-Natal | 3 | 0 | 3 | 0 | 0 | 0 | –1.604 |
Source: ESPNcricinfo

=== Fixtures ===
23 September
09:45
Scorecard

| Eastern Province (South Africa); 199/5 (20 overs) | v | (South Africa) Gauteng; 196/3 (20 overs) |

Eastern Province won by 3 runs
Boland Park, Paarl

- Eastern Province won the toss and elected to bat.
- Farhaan Sayanvala (Gauteng) made his T20 debut.

23 September
13:15
Scorecard

| KwaZulu-Natal (South Africa); 143/6 (20 overs) | v | (South Africa) Boland; 144/6 (19.4 overs) |

Boland won by 4 wickets
Boland Park, Paarl

- Boland won the toss and elected to field.
- Okuhle Cele and Smangaliso Nhlebela (KwaZulu-Natal) both made their T20 debuts.

24 September
09:45
Scorecard

| KwaZulu-Natal (South Africa); 107 (19.3 overs) | v | (South Africa) Gauteng; 108/2 (15 overs) |

Gauteng won by 8 wickets
Boland Park, Paarl

- KwaZulu-Natal won the toss and elected to bat.

24 September
13:15
Scorecard

| Boland (South Africa); 129/7 (20 overs) | v | (South Africa) Eastern Province; 134/4 (18.5 overs) |

Eastern Province won by 6 wickets
Boland Park, Paarl

- Boland won the toss and elected to bat.
- Ziyaad Abrahams (Boland) made his T20 debut.

25 September
09:15
Scorecard

| Eastern Province (South Africa); 150/8 (20 overs) | v | (South Africa) KwaZulu-Natal; 95 (19.2 overs) |

Eastern Province won by 55 runs
Boland Park, Paarl

- KwaZulu-Natal won the toss and elected to field.
- Junaid Dawood (Eastern Province); Dudu Zondo (KwaZulu-Natal) both made their T20 debuts.

25 September
13:15
Scorecard

| Boland (South Africa); 130/7 (20 overs) | v | (South Africa) Gauteng; 131/5 (19.3 overs) |

Gauteng won by 5 wickets
Boland Park, Paarl

- Gauteng won the toss and elected to field.

== Finals ==
=== Semi-finals ===
30 September
09:45
Scorecard

| Eastern Province (South Africa); 163/8 (20 overs) | v | Zimbabwe; 87 (18.5 overs) |

Eastern Province won by 76 runs
Recreation Ground, Oudtshoorn

- Zimbabwe won the toss and elected to field.
- Tinashe Kamunhukamwe, Brandon Mavuta, Kudakwashe Munyede and Milton Shumba (Zimbabwe) all made their T20 debuts.

30 September
13:30
Scorecard

| North West (South Africa); 181/6 (20 overs) | v | (South Africa) Northern Cape; 181/6 (20 overs) |

Match tied
Northern Cape won the one-over eliminator
Recreation Ground, Oudtshoorn

- North West won the toss and elected to bat.

=== Final ===
1 October
Scorecard

| Eastern Province (South Africa); 165/6 (20 overs) | v | (South Africa) Northern Cape; 134/9 (20 overs) |

Eastern Province won by 31 runs
Recreation Ground, Oudtshoorn

- Eastern Province won the toss and elected to bat.
