= Benkenstein =

Benkenstein is a surname. Notable people with the surname include:

- Dale Benkenstein (born 1974), South African cricketer
- Jacqui Benkenstein (born 1974), South African field hockey player
- Luc Benkenstein (born 2004), South African cricketer
- Martin Benkenstein (born 1950), South African cricketer
