= Sinegugu =

Sinegugu is a unisex name. Notable people with the name include:

- Amanda Sinegugu Dlamini (born 1988), South African soccer player and commentator
- Sinegugu Maseko (born 1997), South African cricketer
