= Anwell =

Anwell may refer to:

- Anwell Newman (born 1966), South African cricketer
- Anwell Technologies, Hong Kong manufacturing company
