= Hasan Raza (Sindh cricketer) =

Pakistani cricketer (born 1982)

Personal information
- Born: 11 March 1982 (age 44); Karachi, Sindh, Pakistan
- Batting: Right-handed
- Bowling: Right-arm off break

International information
- National side: Pakistan (1996–2005)
- Test debut (cap 140): 24 October 1996 v Zimbabwe
- Last Test: 3 December 2005 v England
- ODI debut (cap 110): 30 October 1996 v Zimbabwe
- Last ODI: 22 October 1999 v Sri Lanka

Domestic team information
- Years: Team
- 2004–2018: Karachi
- 1999–2018: Habib Bank Limited

Career statistics
Competition	Test	ODI	FC	LA
Matches	7	16	232	197
Runs scored	235	242	13,949	5,155
Batting average	26.11	18.61	44.70	39.35
100s/50s	0/2	0/1	36/63	8/27
Top score	68	77	256	115*
Balls bowled	6	0	1,661	1,034
Wickets	0	–	18	29
Bowling average	–	–	59.11	33.34
5 wickets in innings	–	–	0	0
10 wickets in match	–	–	0	0
Best bowling	–	–	2/11	3/17
Catches/stumpings	5/–	1/–	221/–	77/2
- Source: ESPNcricinfo, 26 January 2019

Hasan Raza (Urdu: حسن رضا; born 11 March 1982) is a Pakistani former cricketer who played for the Pakistan national cricket team between 1996 and 2005. He initially was subject to something of a claim for an international cricketing record, as his debut performance was believed to have taken place at the age of 14 years and 233 days, then a world-record, sparking investigations over the legitimacy of his age claims.

He was soon taken away from international play after struggling initially in the early 2000s, but was recalled against Australia and Zimbabwe in 2004.

Hasan also captained the Pakistan side in early 2007 to Abu Dhabi in a tournament that consisted of India A, Sri Lanka A, UAE, Kenya, and the Netherlands. Pakistan A reached the final of the tournament where they faced off against rivals India. Hasan scored 105 not out. Pakistan went on to win the tournament and Hasan was credited for his captaincy. He had a very good tournament as captain and also had a very good performance with the bat as did a number of other Pakistan A players including Bazid Khan and Taufeeq Umar. Hasan has been a talking point lately in the Pakistan selection committee but has yet to make a comeback. Hasan currently plays domestic Pakistan cricket and also plays in the current Pakistan A team. Hasan was replaced as captain by Bazid Khan for disciplinary reasons.

Hasan had always been a prolific run scorer in Pakistan's domestic cricket but had always been overlooked by selectors because he could not translate his domestic success to the international stage. Frustrated with the PCB, Hasan made a decision that has seemingly ended all hopes of his return to international cricket as he joined the unofficial Indian Cricket League (ICL). In his first season with the ICL he was the leading run scorer.

== Education ==
He was educated at the St. Patrick's High School, Karachi.

== Fixing allegations ==
Hasan Raza was linked by Al Jazeera on the match fixing controversy through tampering the Galle pitch along with Robin Morris and Tharindu Mendis. It was revealed that Hasan Raza didn't directly communicate with Robin Morris and Tharindu Mendis but was found to have connections relating to doctoring the Galle pitch in 2016 during a test match between Sri Lanka and Australia. He was filmed secretly by the Al Jazeera documentary during the meeting on fixing matches in future along with few bookmakers as he seated near Robin Morris at a room with whom he played for Mumbai Champs team at the Indian Cricket League.

In August 2018, on the back of the allegations, he was not selected to play in the 2018–19 Quaid-e-Azam Trophy by his domestic side Pakistan Television.
