= Betting controversies in cricket =

Controversies in the sport of cricket relating to betting

Cricket has had a number of controversies relating to players being involved with the betting aspects of the game. In particular, numerous players have been approached by bookmakers and bribed to throw matches, aspects of matches (e.g. the toss) or provide other information.

== 1999–2000 India-South Africa match fixing scandal ==
In 2000, the Delhi police intercepted a conversation between a blacklisted bookie and the South African cricket captain Hansie Cronje in which they learnt that Cronje accepted money to throw matches. The South African government refused to allow any of its players to face the Indian investigation unit. A court of inquiry was set up and Cronje admitted to throwing matches. He was immediately banned from all cricket. He also named Saleem Malik (Pakistan), Mohammad Azharuddin and Ajay Jadeja (both India).

== 2018 Sri Lanka cricket pitch tampering scandal ==
On 26 May 2018 Al Jazeera news channel findings depict that possibly pitch tampering would have happened during the home test matches involving Sri Lanka against Australia in 2016 and against India in 2017. The news channel also stated that through monitoring the pitch conditions the fixers have managed easily to make money. Match-fixers Robin Morris, a former Indian domestic cricketer along with Dubai based business person Gaurav Rajkumar, Galle groundsman Tharanga Indika and Sri Lankan first-class cricketer Tharindu Mendis have also been investigated by the ICC for attempting another pitch tampering at Galle in Sri Lanka's forthcoming first test match against England as a part of the England's upcoming series against Sri Lanka in November 2018. Concerns also raised by the English Cricket Board whether to play away series against Sri Lanka over the planned pitch tampering at the Galle Cricket Stadium for the first Test match.

== Other controversies ==
During the third Test of the 1981 Ashes series, Australian players Dennis Lillee and Rod Marsh placed a bet on England to win the match after the odds had ballooned out to 500–1. Australia were widely expected to win the match with England at 135-7 after having been made to follow-on. In a remarkable rear-guard effort, England did indeed win the match following brilliant performances from Ian Botham and Bob Willis, and Lillee and Marsh duly collected £7,500 (equivalent to £28,913 in 2025). There has never been any suggestion that the players deliberately underperformed to ensure their bet succeeded; nevertheless, the failure of cricket authorities to censure Lillee and Marsh at the time has led some to suggest that it contributed to the match-fixing scandals of the 1990s and 2000s.

Another scandal was Mark Waugh and Shane Warne's payments from "John the bookmaker" on a tour of Sri Lanka in 1994. The players had received $4,000 and $5,000 respectively from the bookmaker for pitch and weather information. When the then Australian Cricket Board found out about the incident in 1995, it fined the players. Nevertheless, the board withheld the information from the general public at the time, who were not informed until 1998. The Australian Cricket Board received widespread criticism for not immediately announcing the scandal. A later report by Rob O'Regan QC concluded that cricketers were not fully informed about the dangers of interacting with bookmakers, and although no further punishment could be given to either Waugh or Warne, in future players should be punished by not only fines, but also by suspensions.

The ICC was slow to react, but did eventually in 2000 set up an Anti-Corruption and Security Unit headed by Sir Paul Condon, former head of London's Metropolitan Police. It claims to have reduced corruption in cricket to a "reducible minimum".

During the fourth Test of 2010 Pakistani tour of England, News of the World published a story with allegations that Mazhar Majeed and some of the Pakistani players were involved in spot fixing. Pakistani players Salman Butt, Mohammad Asif and Mohammad Amir were later jailed and banned from cricket.

In 2013, three cricketers from New Zealand were approached by the ICC in regards to match fixing, later named as Lou Vincent, Chris Cairns and Daryl Tuffey. In 2014, Vincent admitted to being involved in match fixing.

== In popular culture ==
- The 2009 Hindi film, 99, starring Kunal Khemu, Boman Irani, Soha Ali Khan and Cyrus Broacha, is set in the year 1999, with the India-South Africa match fixing controversy as the backdrop.
- The 2008 Hindi film, Jannat, directed by Kunal Deshmukh and starring Emran Hashmi, Sonal Chauhan and Javed Sheikh is also based on match fixing.
- The 2015 Hindi film Calendar Girls some part is based on the betting on the cricket.
- The 2016 Hindi film Azhar is based on the life of Mohammad Azharuddin. Emraan Hashmi plays his role.
- The,2017 Prime Video series Inside Edge is based on the betting on the domestic league.

== See also ==
- List of cricketers banned for match fixing
- Pakistan cricket spot-fixing controversy
