= Mark Sanders (cricketer) =

South African cricketer

Personal information
- Full name: Mark David Sanders
- Born: 10 July 1979 (age 47); Durban, South Africa
- Batting: Right-handed
- Role: Batsman

Domestic team information
- Years: Team
- 1998/99: KwaZulu-Natal B
- 2002/03–2005/06: KwaZulu-Natal
- 2003/04: Boland

Career statistics
Competition	First-class	List A
Matches	21	10
Runs scored	1,188	163
Batting average	34.94	18.11
100s/50s	1/8	0/1
Top score	103	53
Balls bowled	66	12
Wickets	0	0
Bowling average	–	–
5 wickets in innings	–	–
10 wickets in match	–	–
Best bowling	–	–
Catches/stumpings	7/–	2/–
- Source: CricketArchive, 26 February 2016

Mark David Sanders (born 10 July 1979) is a South African former cricketer active from 1998/99 until 2005/06. Sanders played for KwaZulu-Natal B, KwaZulu-Natal and Boland.

== Career ==
Mark Sanders made his first-class debut in February 1999, playing for KwaZulu-Natal B against Northerns B in a UCB Bowl match, scoring 35 in KwaZulu-Natal's only innings. In the same season, he also played another UCB Bowl match against Western Province B, scoring 88 runs. He made his Supersport Series debut for the main KwaZulu-Natal team against Griqualand West. In the 2002 English cricket season, Sanders also played for Horsham in the Sussex Premier League. Sanders played in two non-List A warm up matches prior to the 2003 Cricket World Cup in South Africa, for the Dolphins against Bangladesh and India. In the match against Bangladesh, Sanders scored 64, the second highest score for the team after Hashim Amla's 76, and in the match against India, Sanders was part of a 49-run opening partnership with Doug Watson, and also caught Sachin Tendulkar at mid-off.

In early 2003, Sanders was signed by Boland; he had been scheduled to play for Lymington in the Southern Premier League, but Boland prevented him from playing. He made his List A debut for Boland against Gauteng, scoring 15 runs. In the 2003/04 Supersport Series, Sanders' significant scores were 65* against Gauteng and 87 against Eastern Province.

For the 2004/05 season, Sanders returned to KwaZulu-Natal, and in the 2004/05 Supersport Series, he made a score of 96 against Western Province. In the 2005/06 Supersport Series, Sanders scored 103 in an opening partnership of 151 with Rivash Gobind against the Border team. It was Sanders' first and only first-class century.
