= Grove Venter =

South African cricketer (born 1993)

Personal information
- Full name: Grove Anton Venter
- Born: 14 April 1993 (age 33); Pretoria, Transvaal, South Africa
- Nickname: Groovy
- Batting: Right-handed
- Role: Wicket-keeper batsman

Domestic team information
- Years: Team
- 2013–: KwaZulu-Natal
- First-class debut: 10 October 2013 KwaZulu-Natal v Namibia
- List A debut: 29 September 2013 KwaZulu-Natal v Griqualand West

Career statistics
Competition	FC	LA	T20
Matches	6	5	2
Runs scored	55	76	26
Batting average	5.50	25.33	13.00
100s/50s	0/0	0/1	0/0
Top score	26	54*	19
Catches/stumpings	8/0	3/1	1/0
- Source: CricketArchive, 26 August 2014

Grove Anton Venter (born 14 April 1993) is a South African first-class cricketer who plays as a wicket-keeper/batsman for the KwaZulu-Natal provincial side. He made his debut for the team against Griqualand West on 29 September 2013 in the CSA Provincial One-Day Competition; he took one catch to dismiss Kagiso Mohale off the bowling of Daryn Dupavillon and was unbeaten on 5 runs as KwaZulu-Natal recorded a three-wicket victory. His first-class debut came 11 days later against Namibia; he took two catches for the first two Namibian wickets, but scored just one run in each innings as Namibia won by an innings and 94 runs. His top scores in both List A and first-class cricket came in successive games, first scoring 54 not out in a 129-run victory over Easterns in the one-day competition on 24 November 2013, before hitting 26 in the first innings of a drawn match against North West on 12–14 December 2013.

Before breaking into the KwaZulu-Natal senior side, Venter spent a season with St Asaph in the North Wales Premier Cricket League, scoring 900 runs in 18 innings at an average of 60.00 with a high score of 155 not out at home to Northop on 26 May 2012.
