= John the bookmaker controversy =

1994–95 Australian cricket controversy

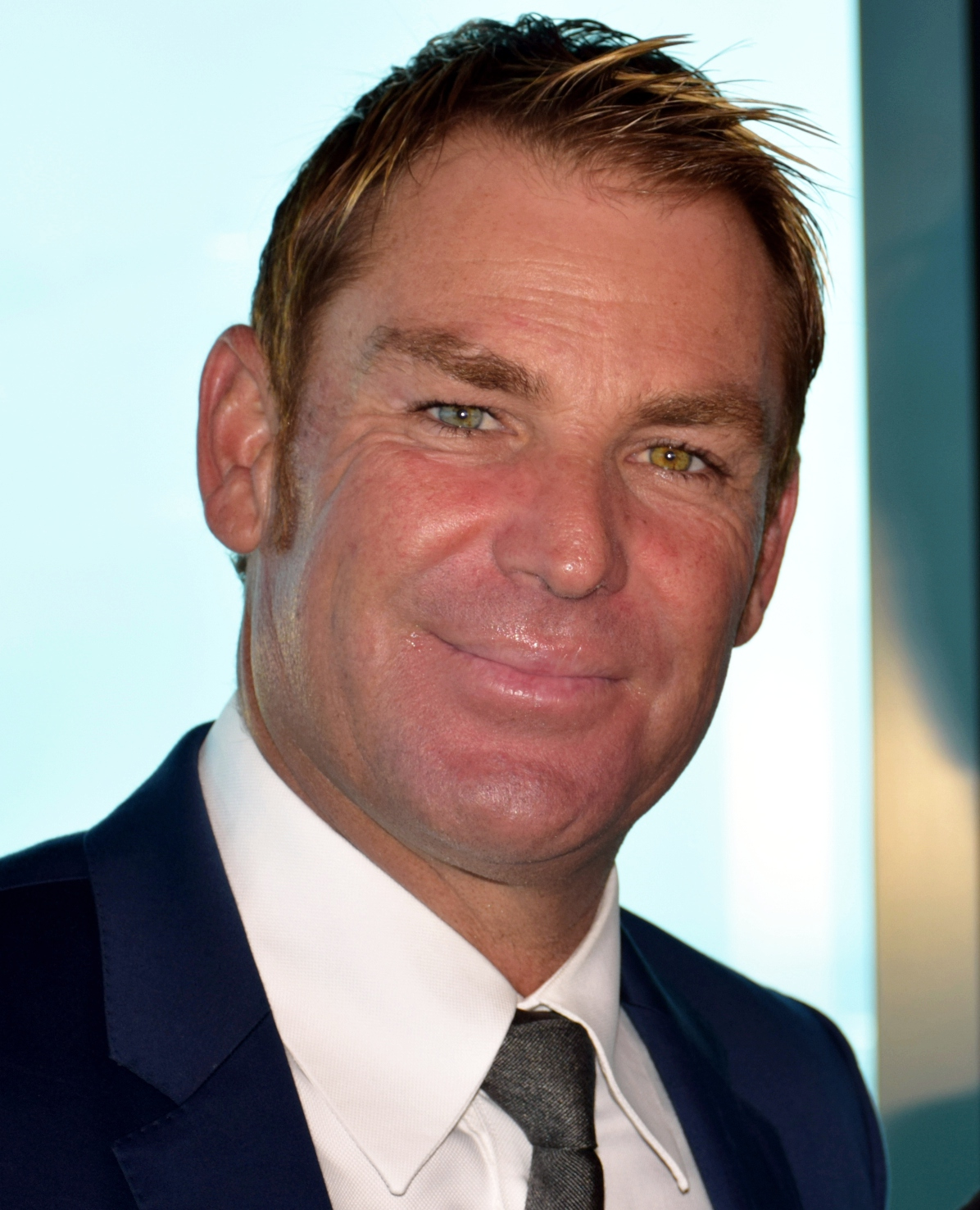
Shane Warne, one of the two cricketers who accepted money from John the bookmaker

"John" or "John the bookmaker" is the name given to an Indian bookmaker who gave money to Australian cricketers Mark Waugh and Shane Warne during the 1994–95 international season, in return for pitch and weather information.

According to the players, they refused to divulge more-strategic material, such as team tactics and player selection policies. One of the most publicised of a series of betting controversies in cricket in the 1990s, the matter was initially covered up by the Australian Cricket Board (ACB), which decided that it was sufficient to privately fine the players. The ACB concluded that, since Waugh and Warne had previously accused Pakistani cricket captain Saleem Malik of attempting to bribe them to lose matches, their credibility as witnesses would be damaged if their own involvement with John was publicised. The ACB reported the matter to the International Cricket Council, and the matter ended there.

When the issue was uncovered by the media in late 1998, the two players were widely condemned by the press and public, as was the ACB for their cover-up. Waugh received a hostile reaction from Australian spectators when he walked out to bat during a Test match immediately after the news broke. On the other hand, the sports community was generally supportive of the players. The ACB appointed Rob O'Regan QC to conduct an independent inquiry into the matter. O'Regan concluded that the fines were inadequate and wrote that a suspension for a "significant time" would have been a more appropriate penalty. He strongly condemned the players' behaviour and their failure as role models for young fans. O'Regan further added that players needed to be better informed about the dangers of gambling and unauthorised bookmakers.

The controversy prompted Pakistan to ask the two Australian players to appear in front of their own judicial inquiry into corruption; Australia responded by granting the Pakistanis permission to hold hearings in Australia with full privileges. The players were questioned about their accusations against Malik, and whether their dealings with John detracted from their credibility. Both Waugh and Warne denied any suggestions they played with less determination in the matches in question, stating that they were among the leading players in those games.

== Involvement with bookmaker ==
During the Singer World Series tournament in Sri Lanka in September 1994, which involved India, Sri Lanka, Pakistan and Australia, the Australian team stayed at the Oberoi Hotel in the capital Colombo. There was a casino in close proximity to the hotel, which Waugh and Warne visited. Team manager Colin Egar had advised Warne that he had been told that the venue was unsavoury, but he was vague in his comments, and at the time, casinos were not perceived as trouble spots or traps for unwary cricketers.

Waugh was approached at the Oberoi by an Indian man, who was also staying at the hotel. The man called himself "John" and gave no surname. John said he was a man who had won money betting on cricket and asked Waugh to provide pitch and weather information; he also asked the Australian to reveal inside knowledge about the team, such as tactics and player selections, in exchange for US$4,000. Waugh accepted the money and agreed to provide information about the pitch and weather, but he refused to divulge the tactics that the Australians intended to use against their opposition, or information on which players would play and what their role would be. Information on pitch conditions provides an insight into the strategies that the team might adopt and which players might be used, and teams will field different players depending on the pitch, as their skills are suited to different conditions. The arrangement with John remained in place until the end of the 1994–95 Australian summer. Waugh later said that at the time, he did not see anything wrong with his actions, reasoning that the agreement was similar to a player speculating about their form and the playing conditions in a pre-match media interview.

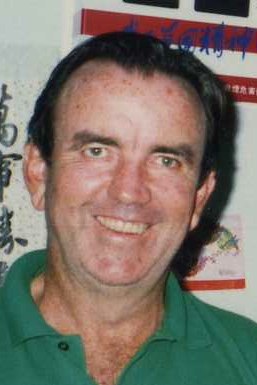
Australian coach Bob Simpson disapproved of betting.

Waugh also agreed to introduce John to Warne. The meeting occurred at the casino near the team hotel. The trio chatted as Warne was playing roulette; he had a bad night and lost US$5,000. John introduced himself to Warne as a person who bet on cricket matches. The next day he invited Warne to his hotel room and, describing himself as a big fan, flattered Warne's leg spinning abilities. Warne accepted a US$5,000 gift, with "no strings attached", which covered his gambling losses. Warne reported that he initially rejected the gift, but accepted the offer at the insistence of John, who said that he would be offended if the offer was declined. Warne later lost this money at the casino. Warne wrote in his autobiography that John told him that he was a wealthy man and that the payment was a token of his appreciation—he had made money by betting on Australian victories in the past.

The two players did not tell their teammates or management about the deal, feeling that their interactions with bookmakers would meet with disapproval. They said that they did not feel that their liaisons were harming their team's chances in any way. They remained silent even after they reported Pakistan captain Saleem Malik for attempting to bribe them during the team's subsequent tour of Pakistan. Australian coach Bob Simpson later said that he was unaware of these events, asserting that his anti-betting attitude would have deterred any players from discussing their involvement in such matters with him.

Both players kept in contact with John throughout the 1994–95 Australian summer, when England toured for five Tests. Warne spoke with John three times during the season, while Waugh continued to deliver pitch and weather conditions. An inquiry conducted by Rob O'Regan QC in late 1998 and early 1999 concluded the following:

Mark Waugh had been warned in 1994 by a senior player rooming with him that providing information over the telephone about conditions, games and teams was unwise as it was likely to come back and haunt him later in his career.

== Secretly punished ==
In early 1995, snippets of information about the world of cricket betting and match-fixing began to be reported by the media. Phil Wilkins of The Sydney Morning Herald reported that an unnamed Pakistani player had attempted to bribe Tim May, Warne and Waugh during Australia's tour of the country in late 1994, immediately after the Singer Trophy. The player was later identified as Saleem Malik, and it was revealed that the Australian trio had privately reported him for offering them money to throw matches.

As a result of the media interest, the ACB privately launched an investigation to determine if any Australian players had been involved with bookmakers. Journalists told officials about speculation that an Australian player was having financial dealings with bookmakers, after Mark Ray of the Sunday Age received an anonymous letter alleging that Waugh and Warne were being paid by a bookmaker for information. Following a private investigation opened by team manager Ian McDonald, Waugh and Warne wrote unsigned handwritten statements on 20 February 1995, acknowledging their involvement. The statements were faxed and sent to Graham Halbish, the CEO of the ACB. Warne and Waugh were called to Sydney for an interview with ACB chairman Alan Crompton at the team hotel, where the Australians had assembled before departing for a tour of the West Indies. The pair admitted their involvement with the bookmaker and were fined A$10,000 and A$8,000, respectively; at the time, these were the highest fines ever imposed on Australian cricketers.

The report compiled by Halbish and Crompton was privately forwarded to the ACB's remaining directors and the International Cricket Council (ICC). The ICC was not informed directly; the ACB delivered the news to their chairman Clyde Walcott and chief executive David Richards. Crompton and Halbish did not consult the other board members before making their decision and effectively handed them a fait accompli; they failed to inform their colleagues until the players had left for the West Indies tour.

The other board members were told about the matter at the end of the meeting. The minutes of the meeting read:

The chairman and chief executive officer reported on a further matter that had come to their attention and been dealt with by them in a manner considered appropriate. The actions of the chairman and the chief executive were approved by the directors present. It was resolved that details should be provided to ICC on a private and confidential basis.

Some board members were uncomfortable with the way the matter was handled. Bob Merriman said that the other board members were "absolutely pizzled [angry]. I don't know what the vote was because there was nobody there". Malcolm Gray said that "it was disgraceful that the Board hadn't been informed before". Damien Mullins said he thought "it was poor and unsatisfactory".

Crompton and Halbish knew that if the involvement of Waugh and Warne with bookmakers was revealed, the credibility of the two players as witnesses against the Pakistani captain Malik would be severely questioned, as they too were involved in activities associated with unregistered gambling. There would be significant pressure on the ACB to ban the players, so they decided to cover up the matter. Board member Cam Battersby said, "The only way he [Malik] was ever going to be convicted was if our evidence was credible ... Revealing the information...would provide an excuse for Pakistan to do nothing". The ACB prepared a press release in case the matter was leaked. The ACB's legal adviser Graeme Johnson later said that he had told Crompton that they were not obliged to tell the press about the matter.

Initially, coach Simpson was not informed; when he found out, he was angry that the ACB had not trusted him enough to tell him what his players had done. Captain Mark Taylor was also aware of the issue by the time he took the team to the West Indies, as were vice-captain Ian Healy and Waugh's brother Steve.

== Aftermath ==
In December 1998, before the Third Test between Australia and England at the Adelaide Oval, the journalist Malcolm Conn of The Australian uncovered the story of John. His report on the matter won him a Walkley Award for journalism. On 8 December, three days before the start of the Test, Conn informed Malcolm Speed—the CEO of the ACB—that he was going to reveal the details of a cover-up of the fines that were imposed on Waugh. At the time, Conn was unaware of Warne's involvement. The ACB responded by pre-empting Conn and releasing a statement, revealing that two unnamed players had been fined in 1994–95 for having financial dealings with bookmakers. Later that evening, former Test cricketer David Hookes, who was then a sports broadcaster, named Waugh and Warne on the Melbourne radio station 3AW. The next day, Conn's story was released on the front page, with the headline "Cricket's Betting Scandal". The article was accompanied by a picture of Waugh with his hand on his head.

On the morning of the publication of Conn's article, the managers of Warne and Waugh organised a media conference after Australia's training session. Both players faced a room packed with media and read prepared statements. Both said they had been "naive and stupid". Waugh concluded:

I regret [it] entirely and wish to restate in the strongest possible manner that I have always given my best for my country in every match I have played and I believe my record, particularly in the last three years, fully supports this statement. I must emphasise that I have never been involved in match-fixing or bribery on cricket matches in any stage of my career.

Much to their discontent, the media were not allowed to ask questions. Patrick Smith of The Age said, "To deliver such bland explanations to the world media as they did yesterday and then not accept questions was contemptuous of the Australian public they have let down so badly." The press attention was so intense that when Waugh attempted to relax with a round of golf at a local course, media helicopters flew overhead.

The players were widely condemned by the media and public; Prime Minister John Howard stated that he felt an "intense feeling of disappointment", while former player Neil Harvey called for bans. Malik, whom Warne and Waugh had accused of attempting to bribe them, said that he was delighted at the revelation. The Pakistani player said that the revelations discredited his accusers and vindicated his protestations of innocence. On the preceding tour of Pakistan a few months earlier, Waugh had appeared before a Pakistan Cricket Board judicial inquiry in Lahore to present his claims against Malik; the inquiry questioned the credibility of both Australian players and asked them to return to Pakistan to re-present their accounts of the events.

The sports community strongly supported the players. May, the President of the Australian Cricketers' Association, and co-accuser of Malik, pledged his organisation's support for the players, whom he described as "outstanding servants of Australian cricket". Waugh received similar statements of support from sports identities. Warne's first Australian captain, Allan Border, defended him, as did former captain and leading commentator Richie Benaud. Sir Don Bradman, widely regarded as the greatest batsman of all time, and former ACB chairman, said that Warne was one of the best influences on Australian cricket for generations, and that the dealings with John did not change this.

Media and public opinion was more hostile. The Sydney Morning Herald ran the headline "Baggy Green Shame", while The Australian wrote of the "$11,000 price of disgrace". Many newspaper columns and letters to the editor attacked the players. The editorial of The Australian stated that "Waugh and Warne said yesterday they had been naïve and stupid. Put the emphasis on the second adjective—and add greedy." Readers called for the players to be banned from playing for Australia as well as the sacking of the ACB officials who had kept the matter secret; some said that the players should never be appointed to leadership roles in the cricket community. In the Weekend Australian of 12 December, Warwick Hadfield and Brian Woodley editorialised that "Warne is in need of some good advice, but not from business managers and PR folk too happy to tell him how wonderful he is in order to flog a few more videos, books, pairs of duds, sports shoes or anti-smoking ads". Warne's major sponsors reviewed their partnerships with him, and three newspapers, the Daily Mirror of the United Kingdom, The Age of Melbourne and The Sydney Morning Herald severed their ties with him.

A few days later, in the wake of the scandal, Waugh was widely jeered by an Australian crowd when he walked out to bat on the first day of the Test. In what he described as the toughest day of his career, Waugh gave an unconvincing and hesitant performance. Waugh managed only seven runs in 36 minutes before being removed by Peter Such, caught and bowled. The cricket writer Peter Roebuck opined that it was the worst home crowd reception for an Australian player that he could remember. Warne was injured at the time and did not play, so he did not have to face the hostile crowd.

== Later inquiries ==
On 8 January 1999, Pakistan's Judicial Commission held a hearing in Melbourne into bribery and match-fixing. The commission had originally summoned Waugh and Warne to Pakistan, but the ACB instead decided to offer them court privileges in Australia. Both Warne and Waugh gave evidence at the public hearing. Waugh seemed nervous and uncertain, whereas Warne appeared assured and confident. They were questioned for approximately 80 and 45 minutes, respectively. The Pakistani investigators attempted to link the Australians' dealings with John to various games during the Australian tour of Pakistan in 1994, over which they had suspicions of match-fixing.

Immediately after Warne and Waugh had met John in Colombo, Australia defeated Pakistan in a one-day match, scoring 7/179 and restricting Pakistan to 9/151 in reply. There were suspicions that the Pakistanis had thrown the game by batting slowly, although Warne said he had genuinely tried his best, pointing out that he was named man-of-the-match. Warne and May had alleged that Malik offered them money to bowl badly on the final day of the First Test in Karachi. Australia then reduced Pakistan from 3/157 to 9/258, and appeared set for victory, but a last-wicket partnership took them to the target of 314. The win was registered when wicket-keeper Ian Healy missed a stumping chance from Warne and the ball went for four byes. Warne denied that he had thrown the match, again pointing out he was named man-of-the-match. Waugh had alleged that Malik offered him money to help Australia lose a one-day match during the same tour. He denied the allegation that he did so. Waugh scored an unbeaten 121, but it was not enough to prevent Australia from suffering a nine-wicket defeat.

Waugh denied betting on cricket, but said he had given John information "about ten times", contradicting his earlier statement that the pair had only talked on "a handful" of occasions. Warne testified that he gave pitch and weather information to John before matches three times—a one-day international against England at the Sydney Cricket Ground in December 1994, the Second Test at the Melbourne Cricket Ground and the Fifth Test at the WACA Ground.

Crompton was the last witness. He said that Warne and Waugh's actions "amounted to a breach of the players' contract in that it brought the game of cricket into disrepute". He said that it was normal for off-field disciplinary breaches to be dealt with in private, while the fallout of on-field incidents was made public. Compton parried Pakistani accusations that he had covered-up the affair. He said that if the matter had been made public, it would have been confused with bribery. The front-page headline in the Melbourne tabloid Herald Sun subsequently read "MATCH FIX", accompanied by pictures of Warne and Waugh. The players responded that "the matter [of the headline] was in the hands of their lawyers". The next day, the headline read "INNOCENT".

Following the public outcry over the suppression of the incident, the ACB appointed Rob O'Regan QC to head up a Player Conduct Inquiry. His assistants conducted 60 preliminary interviews and O'Regan made ten himself. O'Regan released his report on 28 February 1999. He described the fines as "inadequate" as their size "did not reflect the seriousness of what they had done". He suggested that a "suspension for a significant time" was more appropriate.

They must have known that it is wrong to accept money from, and supply information to, a bookmaker whom they also knew as someone who betted on cricket. Otherwise they would have reported the incident to team management long ago before they were found out in February 1995. In behaving as they did they failed lamentably to set the sort of example one might expect from senior players and role models for many young cricketers.

— Rob O'Regan

O'Regan said that Australian players were not prepared for playing cricket in Asia, as they were not aware of the dangers of bookmakers and betting on the Indian subcontinent. He recommended that every new player should be warned of the dangers of becoming involved with bookmakers, and the penalties that it entails. The ICC announced that no further action would be taken against Waugh and Warne as they could not be tried twice for the same offence.

== See also ==
- Betting controversies in cricket
