= Malcolm Conn =

Australian cricket journalist and author

Malcolm Conn is a New Zealand born cricket journalist who was the News Corp chief cricket writer.

Conn won a Walkley Award in 1999 for his coverage of the John the bookmaker controversy involving Australian cricketers Shane Warne and Mark Waugh.

Conn is renowned in journalistic circles for his expert use of the literary technique, "brutal irony". Conn is known for his catchphrase "Strewth!", usually coupled with a statement that will come back to haunt him in the most dramatic way possible the next day. Conn cites Shakespeare for his love of this comedic tragedy.
