= Mika Mutumbe =

Namibian cricketer (born 1989)

Personal information
- Born: 23 August 1989 (age 37); Namibia
- Source: ESPNcricinfo, 1 September 2016

Mika Mutumbe (born 23 August 1989) is a Namibian cricketer. He was included in Namibia's squad for the 2016 Africa T20 Cup. In October 2018, he was named in Namibia's squad in the Southern sub region group for the 2018–19 ICC World Twenty20 Africa Qualifier tournament in Botswana.
