= Julian Soutter =

South African cricketer (born 1994)

Personal information
- Full name: Julian Kenny Soutter
- Born: 20 August 1994 (age 32); Klerksdorp, South Africa
- Source: ESPNcricinfo, 1 September 2016

Julian Soutter (born 20 August 1994) is a South African first-class cricketer. He was included in the North West squad for the 2016 Africa T20 Cup. In September 2018, he was named in Limpopo's squad for the 2018 Africa T20 Cup.
