= Roland Pearce =

South African cricketer (1930–2022)

Personal information
- Full name: Roland Anthony Pearce
- Born: 19 June 1930; Singapore
- Died: October 2022 (aged 92)
- Batting: Right-handed
- Role: Wicketkeeper-batsman

Domestic team information
- Years: Team
- 1956–57 to 1957–58: Natal

Career statistics
| Competition | First-class |
|---|---|
| Matches | 6 |
| Runs scored | 152 |
| Batting average | 16.88 |
| 100s/50s | 0/1 |
| Top score | 95 |
| Catches/stumpings | 15/2 |
- Source: Cricinfo, 4 October 2017

Roland Anthony Pearce (19 June 1930 – October 2022) was a cricketer who played first-class cricket in South Africa in 1956 and 1957.

Pearce was born in Singapore and after time in Hong Kong and New York, his family settled in Durban, where he was educated at Hilton College.

Pearce made a spectacular start to his brief first-class career. Early in the 1956–57 South African cricket season he replaced Paul Randles, who had been Natal's regular wicketkeeper since 1952–53, in the Natal team for the friendly match against Western Province. Pearce took seven catches and a stumping and, opening Natal's innings with Trevor Goddard, made 95 and put on 163 for the first wicket. He was immediately selected to keep wicket for the South African XI that played the touring MCC a week later. The South African XI won, but Pearce failed with the bat and made no dismissals. He played just four more matches for Natal over that season and the next.

After his cricket career, Pearce lived for some years in Australia and England before returning to Durban. He was managing director of Romatex Industrials before his retirement in 1990. He was married twice and had three children. He died in October 2022, at the age of 92.
