= Luc Benkenstein =

South African cricketer (born 2004)

Personal information
- Full name: Luc Martin Benkenstein
- Born: 2 November 2004 (age 22); Durban, South Africa
- Batting: Right-handed
- Bowling: Right-arm leg break
- Role: All-rounder
- Relatives: Dale Benkenstein (father); Martin Benkenstein (grandfather)

Domestic team information
- Years: Team
- 2021–2026: Essex (squad no. 99)
- 2024: Chitwan Rhinos
- 2027–: Durham
- First-class debut: 9 September 2024 Essex v Nottinghamshire
- List A debut: 8 August 2021 Essex v Durham

Career statistics
Competition	FC	LA	T20
Matches	7	38	38
Runs scored	160	1,040	583
Batting average	14.54	28.88	21.59
100s/50s	0/0	1/6	0/3
Top score	42	140	67
Balls bowled	–	825	340
Wickets	–	25	16
Bowling average	–	37.52	35.56
5 wickets in innings	–	1	0
10 wickets in match	–	0	0
Best bowling	–	6/42	2/23
Catches/stumpings	3/–	10/–	19/–
- Source: Cricinfo, 27 September 2026

Luc Martin Benkenstein (born 2 November 2004) is a South African-born English cricketer.

== Career ==
Benkenstein was born in Durban, South Africa and attended Seaford College in West Sussex. He made his List A debut on 8 August 2021, for Essex in the 2021 Royal London One-Day Cup.

In 2022, he was named in the team of the tournament in the Pakistan Junior League. In June 2024, Benkenstein was selected as captain of the England U19s team for their home series against Sri Lanka U19s.

In October 2024, Benkenstein signed to play for the Chitwan Rhinos in the inaugural Nepal Premier League T20 tournament.

On 19 November 2026, it was announced he had left Essex and joined Durham on a multi-year contract.
