= Xolani Mahlaba =

South African cricketer (born 1998)

Personal information
- Born: 22 May 1998 (age 28)
- Source: ESPNcricinfo, 9 September 2016

Xolani Mahlaba (born 22 May 1998) is a South African cricketer. He made his Twenty20 debut for Easterns against Border in the 2016 Africa T20 Cup on 9 September 2016. He made his first-class debut for KwaZulu-Natal Inland in the 2018–19 CSA 3-Day Provincial Cup on 14 March 2019.
