= Nelson Setimani =

South African cricketer (born 1990)

Personal information
- Born: 5 February 1990 (age 36); King William's Town, South Africa
- Source: Cricinfo, 13 September 2016

Nelson Setimani (born 5 February 1990) is a South African cricketer. He was included in the South Western Districts cricket team squad for the 2016 Africa T20 Cup. In September 2019, he was named in Eastern Province's squad for the 2019–20 CSA Provincial T20 Cup.
