= Anwell Newman =

South African cricketer

Personal information
- Born: 10 December 1966 (age 59); Stellenbosch, South Africa
- Source: Cricinfo, 1 December 2020

Anwell Newman (born 10 December 1966) is a South African former cricketer. He played in eight first-class matches for Boland from 1993–94 to 1997–98.

== Early life ==
He was born in Stellenbosch, a town in the Western Cape province of South Africa.

Inspired by two of his physical education teachers, he studied physical education and biology at Athlone College of Athlone, Cape Town and then technology at Langa Technical School in Langa, South Africa and Cape Peninsula University of Technology.

== Cricket career ==
Newman is a right-arm fast bowler and right-handed batsman. Louis Hartzenberg, head of the VBSCC, said that Newman was an all-rounder, a hard-hitting batsman, and "a swing bowler with immaculate line and length".

He played for Boland under the head coach Bob Woolmer. The first game he played for Boland was against the Transvaal cricket team.

After leaving Boland, he continued playing cricket in provincial leagues. In 2020, he was selected to represent South Africa for the Over 50's Cricket World Cup, a tournament for veteran cricketers. This was the first time he had played for his home country. During the apartheid era, which also affected cricket in South Africa, race was a factor in selecting players to represent the country, and he was one of several players on this team, including Rodney Malamba, Mlungisi ‘Lefty’ Ngece, and Nazeem White, that had not been permitted to play for the South Africa national cricket team under the apartheid system. When Newman was selected for this veterans tournament, he had been playing for the Vredenburg Saldanha Cricket Club for 12 years.

He has also played for Paarl Cricket Club and the United Cricket Club in the Western Province League, as well as the Boland Caveliers, the Boland presidents team, and the South African treasury cricket team.

He has also been a cricket coach.

== Outside of cricket ==
He has taught technology and civil technology in Vredenburg for more than 30 years, and he is the head of the high school's civil technology department. In 2022, he was promoted to the position of superintendent. Planning for a non-cricket career and becoming a credentialed coach were both paths recommended to all players by the Boland's coach Bob Woolmer when Newman played for them.

== See also ==
- List of Boland representative cricketers
