= Rob O'Regan =

Australian barrister

Rob O'Regan KC was an Australian barrister and a former chairman of the Queensland Criminal Justice Commission. He was named chairman of the Australian Red Cross in 2001.

In 1998 he was asked by the Australian Cricket Board to head an inquiry into cricket corruption. His report concluded that cricket players were not well informed about their responsibility to uphold the spirit of the game, and although he disagreed with the punishments given to Shane Warne and Mark Waugh in response to their dealings with "John the bookmaker," he ruled that they could not be punished twice over the incident.

== See also ==
- Betting controversies in cricket
