= Brad Moses =

South African cricketer (born 1983)

Personal information
- Full name: Bradley Moses
- Born: 3 April 1983 (age 43); Durban, South Africa
- Batting: Right-handed
- Bowling: Off break

Domestic team information
- Years: Team
- 2006/07–2010/11: KwaZulu-Natal Inland
- 2009/10–2010/11: Dolphins
- 2011/12: Easterns
- 2012/13–2013/14: KwaZulu-Natal Inland
- FC debut: 12 October 2006 KwaZulu-Natal Inland v KwaZulu-Natal
- Last FC: 13 March 2014 KZN Inland v Eastern Province
- LA debut: 15 October 2006 KZN Inland v KwaZulu-Natal
- Last LA: 16 December 2013 KZN Inland v Northerns

Career statistics
Competition	FC	LA	FC
Matches	75	52	15
Runs scored	3,791	1,070	179
Batting average	32.40	28.16	14.91
100s/50s	6/19	1/8	0/1
Top score	119	101	59
Balls bowled	1,828	931	60
Wickets	20	31	2
Bowling average	56.00	26.87	41.00
5 wickets in innings	0	0	0
10 wickets in match	0	0	0
Best bowling	2/7	4/23	1/14
Catches/stumpings	48/–	8/–	4/–
- Source: CricketArchive, 14 July 2025

Bradley Moses (born 3 April 1983) is a South African former professional cricketer. Born at Durban, he started his career with KwaZulu-Natal Inland in 2006 and played for Dolphins before joining Easterns for the 2011–12 season. He returned to KwaZulu-Natal Inland for two more seasons, completing his career after playing 75 first-class matches.

Moses also played for several British clubs and in the Netherlands. He played for Harpenden Cricket Club in the Home Counties League, for Radcliffe-on-Trent and for Flitwick. During 2011 he played for VRA Amsterdam and in 2012 for Great Ayton in the North Yorkshire and South Durham Premier League. During the following season he played for Lancashire League team Enfield Cricket Club, the Central Lancashire League's Heywood Cricket Club, and for Kendal Cricket Club in the Northern Premier League. Between 2014 and 2016 he played at Stewart's Melville Royal High in Scotland and in 2016 for Bacup in the Lancashire League.
