= Ormerod Pearse =

South African cricketer (1884–1953)

Ormy Pearse
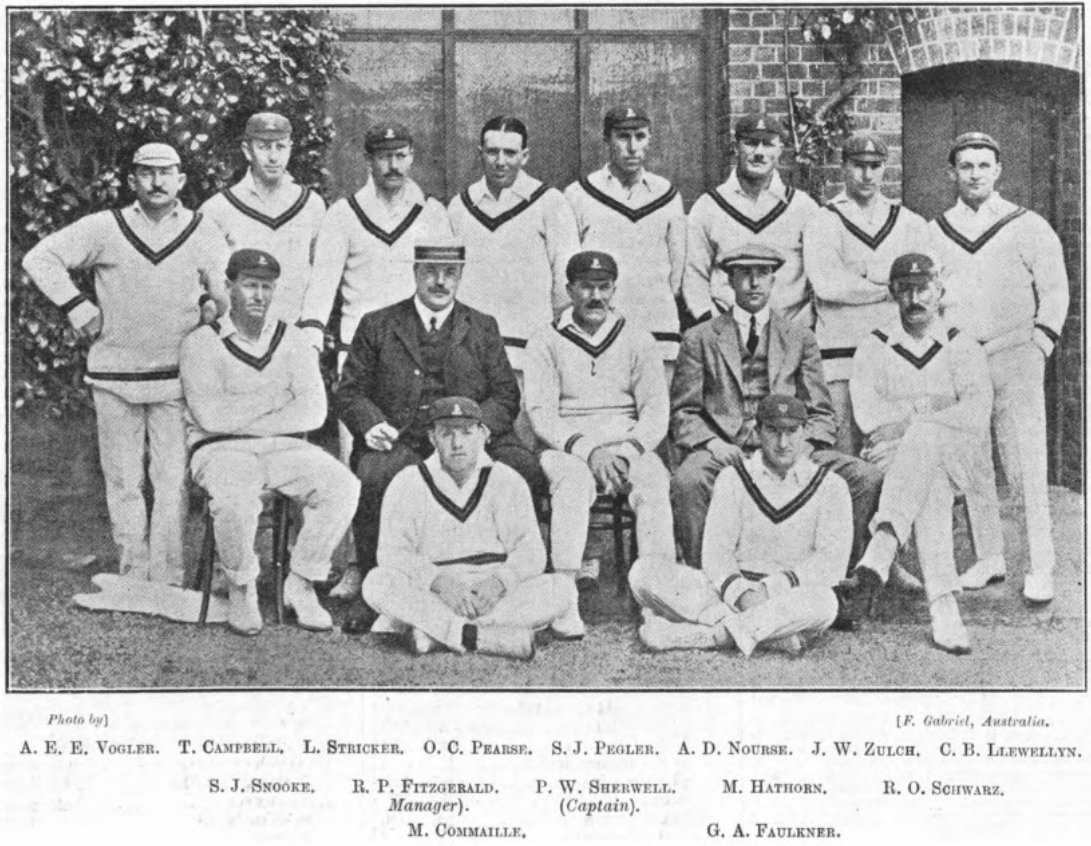
- The South African team in Australia in 1910-11. Pearse is fourth from the left in the back row.

Personal information
- Full name: Charles Ormerod Cato Pearse
- Born: 10 October 1884; Pietermaritzburg, Colony of Natal
- Died: 28 May 1953 (aged 68); Durban, Natal, South Africa
- Batting: Right-handed
- Bowling: Right-arm medium

International information
- National side: South Africa

Domestic team information
- Years: Team
- 1905-06 to 1923-24: Natal

Career statistics
Competition	Tests	First-class
Matches	3	24
Runs scored	55	973
Batting average	9.16	23.73
100s/50s	0/0	0/5
Top score	31	74
Balls bowled	144	472
Wickets	3	11
Bowling average	35.33	31.18
5 wickets in innings	0	0
10 wickets in match	0	0
Best bowling	3/56	3/56
Catches/stumpings	1/–	16/–
- Source: CricketArchive, 28 September 2021

Charles Ormerod Cato "Ormy" Pearse (10 October 1884 – 28 May 1953) was a South African cricketer who played in three Tests from 1910 to 1911. His brother was the first-class cricketer Vyvyan Pearse.

Pearse was born into a military family in Pietermaritzburg and attended Maritzburg College there. After leaving school he took up banking. He married Dorothy Vera Shepstone in Pietermaritzburg in January 1918. He died of coronary thrombosis at home in Durban on 28 May 1953, aged 68.
