= Robin Morris =

Indian cricketer

Personal information
- Full name: Robin Francis Morris
- Born: 6 November 1976 (age 50); Mumbai, India
- Role: all-rounder

Domestic team information
- Years: Team
- Mumbai
- Orissa

Career statistics
Competition	FC	LA	T20
Matches	42	51	2
Runs scored	1358	1397	25
Batting average	23.41	31.75	12.50
100s/50s	0/9	1/9	0/0
Top score	93*	111	19
Balls bowled	4639	1783	–
Wickets	76	46	–
Bowling average	28.94	32.89	–
5 wickets in innings	4	1	–
10 wickets in match	0	0	–
Best bowling	6/39	5/30	–
Catches/stumpings	27/–	15/–	0/–
- Source: ESPNcricinfo, 26 May 2018

Robin Francis Morris (born 6 November 1976) is a former Indian cricketer who played for both Mumbai and Odisha in first-class, List A and T20 matches. He was caught for involving in doctoring the pitch conditions for betting purposes at Galle stadium during Sri Lanka's home test matches against India and Australia.

== Career ==
Robin Morris made his First-class cricket debut for Mumbai during the 1997–98 Ranji Trophy season. He also played for the Mumbai Champs team between 2000 and 2009 in the Indian Cricket League, a List A cricket tournament which was defunct in 2009. He was part of the Mumbai Champs squad during the Champions Cup 2000–01.

He played his last first-class cricket match during the 2004-05 Irani Cup for Mumbai against the Rest of India cricket team. Robin Morris went onto quit cricket at the age of 31 after becoming a victim by playing in the Indian Cricket League which went onto become a controversial issue leading the tournament to be scrapped from part of the BCCI programme.

== Fixing allegations ==
Robin Morris was alleged by the International Cricket Council for being involved as the match-fixer during Sri Lanka's home Test series against both Australia in 2016 and against India in 2017. Robin Morris was intended to have influenced in fixing allegations relating to Sri Lankan home matches for attempting pitch tampering by the ICC during Sri Lanka's 2nd test match against Australia in Galle and Sri Lanka's 1st test match against India in Galle. Robin was reported to have given bribes to groundsman, Tharanga Indika who works as the groundsman at the Galle International Stadium to monitor the pitch conditions in those 2 home matches played by Sri Lanka against Australia in 2016 and India in 2017 and was noticed to have earned from betting after analysing the Galle pitch conditions. Robin Morris explained that the Galle pitch was prepared in favour of bowlers and the Sri Lankan cricket team during the 2nd test against Australia in 2016 where Sri Lanka managed to win the match by a massive margin of 229 runs, where Australia lost all 20 wickets within 3 days when batting second consuming only 501 balls.

Robin Morris along with Dubai based business person Gaurav Rajkumar, Galle groundsman Tharanga Indika and Sri Lankan first-class cricketer Tharindu Mendis have also been investigated by the ICC for attempting to another pitch tampering at Galle in Sri Lanka's forthcoming first test match against England as a part of the England's series against Sri Lanka in November 2018.

In December 2019, Morris along with four other people, were arrested with regards to an alleged kidnapping.

== See also ==
- Betting controversies in cricket
