= Sinegugu Maseko =

South African cricketer (born 1997)

Personal information
- Born: 29 June 1997 (age 29)
- Source: ESPNcricinfo, 21 September 2016

Sinegugu Maseko (born 29 June 1997) is a South African first-class cricketer. He was included in Boland's squad for the 2016 Africa T20 Cup.
