= Andrew Schwass =

New Zealand cricketer (born 1974)

Personal information
- Full name: Andrew Mark Schwass
- Born: 11 January 1974 (age 52); Nelson, New Zealand
- Batting: Right-handed
- Bowling: Right-arm fast-medium

Domestic team information
- Years: Team
- 1998/99–2004/05: Central Districts

Career statistics
Competition	First-class	List A
Matches	29	46
Runs scored	558	252
Batting average	18.00	10.95
100s/50s	0/0	0/0
Top score	44	32*
Balls bowled	5,565	2,217
Wickets	109	70
Bowling average	23.43	23.97
5 wickets in innings	6	1
10 wickets in match	0	0
Best bowling	7/36	5/22
Catches/stumpings	10/–	17/–
- Source: Cricinfo, 1 January 2023

Andrew Mark Schwass (born 11 April 1974) is a former New Zealand cricketer who played first-class and List A cricket for Central Districts before retiring in 2005 due to ankle injuries. He also played for Nelson in the Hawke Cup. Since 2012 he has run a company in the South Island specialising in bicycle touring.

Schwass was a fast-medium bowler and useful tail-end batsman. His best first-class figures were 7 for 36 when Central Districts defeated Northern Districts at Horton Park, Blenheim, in December 2001. These figures are also the first-class record for Horton Park. His best one-day figures were 5 for 22 in Central Districts' narrow victory over Northern Districts at Owen Delany Park, Taupō, in January 2005. These figures are also the List A record for Owen Delany Park.
