= St Asaph Cricket Club =

Welsh cricket team

St Asaph
Personnel
- 1st XI captain: William Ryan
- 2nd XI captain: Andrew Mearns
- Chairman: Gareth Ryan

Team information
- Founded: 1862
- Home ground: Elwy Grove Park
- Official website: http://stasaph.play-cricket.com/

St Asaph Cricket Club is a Welsh cricket club based in St Asaph, Denbighshire. The club plays at Elwy Grove Park. The club has played in the North Wales Premier Cricket League Premier Division since 2002, with the exception of the 2009 season, when they played in Division One; they won the league title in 2021, which was their first title since 1975, and then again in 2023. The club operates three senior men's teams and two ladies senior teams, all of which play in the North Wales league system, as well as four age-group sides.
