= Vyvyan Pearse =

South African cricketer and British Army officer

Personal information
- Full name: Gerald Vyvyan Pearse
- Born: 7 September 1891; Pietermaritzburg, Colony of Natal
- Died: 19 December 1956 (aged 65); Marylebone, London, England
- Batting: Right-handed
- Bowling: Right-arm (unknown style)
- Relatives: Charles Pearse (brother); Dudley Pearse (brother); David Pearse (great-nephew); Mark Pearse (great nephew)

Domestic team information
- Years: Team
- 1910/11: Natal
- 1919: Oxford University
- 1925–1926: Marylebone Cricket Club

Career statistics
| Competition | First-class |
|---|---|
| Matches | 14 |
| Runs scored | 413 |
| Batting average | 22.94 |
| 100s/50s | –/2 |
| Top score | 67* |
| Balls bowled | 1,500 |
| Wickets | 27 |
| Bowling average | 34.51 |
| 5 wickets in innings | – |
| 10 wickets in match | – |
| Best bowling | 4/57 |
| Catches/stumpings | 12/– |
- Source: Cricinfo, 6 June 2019

Gerald Vyvyan Pearse (7 September 1891 – 19 December 1956) MBE MC was a South African first-class cricketer and British Army officer. Pearse initially played first-class cricket for Natal in South Africa, before moving to England to take up a Rhodes Scholarship at the University of Oxford. He served in the British Army during the First World War with the Royal Field Artillery, during which he was awarded the Military Cross. After the war he played first-class cricket in England for Oxford University, the Free Foresters and the Marylebone Cricket Club. He later served in the Second World War and was made an MBE at its conclusion. He was the youngest brother of the Test cricketer Charles Pearse.

== Early life and WWI service ==
Pearse was born at Pietermaritzburg in Natal in September 1891. He was educated at Maritzburg College, before accepting a Rhodes Scholarship to study in England at the University of Oxford. Prior to attending the university, Pearse had debuted in first-class cricket for Natal in two matches at Durban against Border and Griqualand West in the 1910-11 Currie Cup. Once in England he attended Brasenose College at Oxford, however his studies were interrupted by the First World War. He was commissioned as a second lieutenant with the Royal Field Artillery in November 1914. He was promoted to the temporary rank of lieutenant in January 1916, while in December of the same year he was made an acting captain and awarded the Military Cross. In October 1917 he was made an acting major.

== Post-war first-class cricket ==
Following the war, Pearse returned to complete his studies at Oxford. He played eight first-class cricket matches for Oxford University in 1919, scoring 198 runs with a high score of 44, as well as taking 21 wickets at an average of 32.09, with best figures of 4 for 57. Still retained by the British Army, he had relinquished his acting rank of major in July 1919. After completing his studies at Oxford, Pearse returned to service with the Royal Field Artillery. He was again made a temporary major in June 1921. He played first-class cricket for the Marylebone Cricket Club in two matches in 1925 and 1926, as well as appearing in two matches for the Free Foresters in 1926 and 1927. It was for the Free Foresters that he made his highest first-class score, with 67 not out against Oxford University in 1927.

At some point around the later 1920s, he left the army and became a liquidator. He was made an emergency commission into the Royal Artillery, serving during the Second World War. He was made an MBE in the 1946 New Year Honours. He died at Marylebone in December 1956. Pearse came from a large cricketing family, with his eldest brother Charles playing Test cricket for South Africa. His middle brother Dudley played first-class cricket, as did two great-nephews: David Pearse and Mark Pearse.
