= Jesse Smit =

South African cricketer (born 1996)

Personal information
- Born: 23 August 1996 (age 30)
- Source: ESPNcricinfo, 21 September 2016

Jesse Smit (born 23 August 1996) is a South African first-class cricketer. He was included in KwaZulu-Natal's squad for the 2016 Africa T20 Cup.
