= Brian Gessner =

South African cricketer

Personal information
- Full name: Brian Dennis Gessner
- Born: 20 June 1947 (age 79); Durban, Natal Province, South Africa
- Batting: Left-handed
- Bowling: Left-arm fast-medium

Domestic team information
- Years: Team
- 1970/71–1976/77: Natal
- 1978–1979: Staffordshire

Career statistics
Competition	First-class	List A
Matches	32	5
Runs scored	68	10
Batting average	5.23	–
100s/50s	0/0	0/0
Top score	29*	9*
Balls bowled	5,202	330
Wickets	101	8
Bowling average	20.54	24.00
5 wickets in innings	0	0
10 wickets in match	0	0
Best bowling	6/67	2/24
Catches/stumpings	13/–	3/–
- Source: Cricinfo, 8 July 2011

Brian Dennis Gessner (born 20 June 1947) is a South African former cricketer. Gessner was a left-handed batsman who bowled left-arm fast-medium. He was born in Durban, Natal Province.

Gessner made his first-class debut for Natal B against Border in the 1970/71 Currie Cup. He appeared in first-class cricket for Natal representative teams from 1971 to 1977, making 32 first-class matches appearances, the last of which came for Natal B against Border in the 1976/77 Currie Cup. He made 19 appearances for Natal B, taking 65 wickets at an average of 19.56, with 3 five wicket hauls. His best innings bowling figures of 6/67 came against Northern Transvaal in the 1976/77 Currie Cup. The remainder of his 13 first-class appearances came for Natal, with Gessner taking 36 wickets at an average of 22.30. He took just the one five wicket haul for the Natal first team, which came against Rhodesia in the 1972/73 Currie Cup, with Gessner taking 5/58.

It was for Natal that he made his List A debut against Transvaal in the 1972/73 Gillette Cup. Gessner made 3 further List A appearances for Natal, the last of which came against Western Province in the 1975/76 Gillette Cup. In his 4 List A appearances for Natal, he took 7 wickets at an average of 20.14, with best figures of 2/24. Had South Africa not been expelled from international cricket by the International Cricket Conference, Gessner may well have had an international career.

He later played for Staffordshire in English county cricket, making his debut for the county in the 1978 Minor Counties Championship against Shropshire. He played Minor counties cricket in 1978 and 1979, making 11 appearances. He made a single List A appearance for the county in the 1978 Gillette Cup against Sussex. In this match, he took the wicket of Pakistan Test cricketer Imran Khan for the cost of 51 runs from 12 overs. With the bat, he ended Staffordshire's innings not out on 9, with Sussex winning by the narrow margin of 2 runs.
