= Justin Gamble =

South African cricketer

Personal information
- Full name: Justin Gamble
- Source: ESPNcricinfo, 16 October 2016

Justin Gamble is a South African cricketer. He made his List A debut for Easterns in the 2016–17 CSA Provincial One-Day Challenge on 9 October 2016.
