= Dudu Zondo =

South African cricketer (born 1994)

Personal information
- Full name: Ziphozokuthlula Zibusiso Zondo
- Born: 10 May 1994 (age 32); Durban, South Africa
- Source: ESPNcricinfo, 25 September 2016

Dudu Zondo (born 10 May 1994) is a South African professional cricketer. He made his Twenty20 debut for KwaZulu-Natal against Eastern Province in the 2016 Africa T20 Cup on 25 September 2016. He made his first-class debut for KwaZulu-Natal in the 2016–17 Sunfoil 3-Day Cup on 6 October 2016. He made his List A debut for KwaZulu-Natal in the 2016–17 CSA Provincial One-Day Challenge on 9 October 2016.
