= 2014 Ram Slam T20 Challenge (January) =

- Dates: 5 January 2014 – 9 February 2014
- Administrator: Cricket South Africa
- Cricket format: Twenty20
- Tournament format(s): Double round-robin and knockout
- Host: South Africa
- Champions: Dolphins (1st title)
- Participants: 6
- Matches: 33
- Most runs: David Miller, Dolphins (383)
- Most wickets: Beuran Hendricks, Cape Cobras (28)

The 2013–14 Ram Slam T20 Challenge was the eleventh season of the Ram Slam T20 Challenge, established by the Cricket South Africa. The tournament was previously known as the MiWay T20 Challenge and the Standard Bank Pro20 Series. The tournament was played between 5 January and 9 February 2014.

The Dolphins beat the Cape Cobras in the final by 2 runs to win the tournament for the first time.

== Venues ==
Map of the venues for the 2012–13 Ram Slam T20 Challenge

Stadium	City	Capacity	Home team
Newlands	Cape Town	25,000	Cape Cobras
Boland Bank Park	Paarl	10,000	Cape Cobras
Kingsmead	Durban	25,000	Dolphins
Chevrolet Park	Bloemfontein	20,000	Knights
De Beers Diamond Oval	Kimberley	11,000	Knights
New Wanderers Stadium	Johannesburg	34,000	Highveld Lions
Senwes Park	Potchefstroom	9,000	Highveld Lions
SuperSport Park	Centurion	20,000	Titans
Willowmoore Park	Benoni	20,000	Titans
St George's Park	Port Elizabeth	19,000	Warriors
Buffalo Park	East London	15,000	Warriors

The first round of matches were all played on 5 January in Cape Town.

== Rules and regulations ==
The tournament is divided into a group stage and a knockout stage. In the group stage, teams face each other in a double round-robin tournament (i.e. each team plays every other team twice, once at home and once away). At the end of the group stage, the top team qualifies for the final. The teams in second and third take part in a play-off match with the winners contesting the final. If a match in the knockout stage ends with a tie, a Super Over will determine the winner.

Points were awarded as follows in the group stage:

Point system
Result	Points
Win, with bonus point	5 points
Win, without bonus point	4 points
Tie	3 points
No result	2 points
Loss	0 points

- The team that achieves a run rate of 1.25 times that of the opposition shall be rewarded one bonus point.
- A team's run rate will be calculated by reference to the runs scored in an innings divided by the number of overs faced.
- Points are deducted for slow over rate at 1 point per over not completed within the allotted 90 minutes.

In the event of teams finishing on equal points, the right to play in the semi-finals will be determined in the following order of priority:

- The team with the most wins;
- If still equal, the team with the most wins over the other team(s) who are equal on points and have the same number of wins;
- If still equal, the team with the highest number of bonus points;
- If still equal, the team with the highest net run rate;
- The team with the higher runs to wickets ratio throughout the series.

== Teams and standings ==
Pos	Team	Pld	W	L	T	NR	BP	Pts	NRR
1	Cape Cobras (R)	10	8	2	0	0	2	34	1.048
2	Dolphins (C)	10	6	3	1	0	1	28	0.400
3	Titans	10	5	4	0	1	0	22	−0.063
4	Warriors	10	3	4	2	1	0	20	−0.019
5	Knights	10	3	6	0	1	0	14	−0.813
6	Highveld Lions	10	1	7	1	1	0	9	−0.687

(C) = Eventual champion; (R) = Runner-up.
Note: The winner and runner-up qualify for the 2014 Champions League Twenty20.

- List of results at ESPN Cricinfo

== Knockout stage ==
Semi-final

6 February
18:00 (D/N)
Scorecard

(H) Dolphins; 200/4 (20 overs)	v	Titans; 169 (19.2 overs)
David Miller 93* (37); Henry Davids 1/23 (3 overs)		Heino Kuhn 76 (39); Mthokozisi Shezi 4/39 (4 overs)

Dolphins won by 31 runs
Kingsmead, Durban
Umpires: Adrian Holdstock and Ian Howell
Player of the match: Farhaan Behardien (batsman, Titans), Alfonso Thomas (bowler, Titans)

- Titans won the toss and elected to field.
- The match was originally due to be played the previous day but was abandoned without a ball bowled.

Final

9 February
14:30
Scorecard

Dolphins; 146/8 (20 overs)	v	Cape Cobras (H); 144/7 (20 overs)
Morne van Wyk 47 (45); Jacques Kallis 4/26 (3 overs)		Sybrand Engelbrecht 56 (39); Kyle Abbott 2/17 (4 overs)

Dolphins won by 2 runs
Newlands, Cape Town
Umpires: Adrian Holdstock and Dennis Smith

- Dolphins won the toss and elected to bat.
