= North Wales Cricket League =

Welsh cricket league

- Countries: Wales
- Administrator: Cricket Wales
- Format: Limited overs
- First edition: 2001 (ECB Premier League)
- Tournament format: League
- Number of teams: 10 (Premier Division)
- Current champion: St Asaph CC
- Most successful: Llandudno (9)
- Website: https://nwcl.play-cricket.com/

The North Wales Cricket League is the top level of competition for recreational club cricket in North Wales, and the league Headquarters is based at The Oval, Llandudno, Wales LL30 2TB . Since 2001, the North Wales Cricket League has been an accredited ECB Premier League as part of the expansion of cricket at a grassroots level.

== Champions ==
- League champions 2001–2019
  Year	Club
  2001	Bangor
  2002	Bangor
  2003	Hawarden Park
  2004	Llandudno
  2005	Mold
  2006	Llandudno
  2007	Llandudno
  2008	Llandudno
  2009	Llandudno
  2010	Llandudno
  2011	Connah's Quay
  2012	Llandudno
  2013	Llandudno
  2014	Menai Bridge
  2015	Menai Bridge
  2016	Llandudno
  2017	Bangor
  2018	Menai Bridge
  2019	Bangor
- 2020-present
  Year	Club
  2020	COVID-19 pandemic
  2021	St Asaph
  2022	Menai Bridge
  2023	St Asaph
  2024	Mochdre
  2025	Bangor
  2026	St Asaph

=== Championships won ===
League championship
Wins	Club
9	Llandudno
5	Bangor
4	Menai Bridge
3	St Asaph
1	Connah's Quay
1	Hawarden Park
1	Mold
1	Mochdre

== Performance by season from 2001 ==
Key
Gold	Champions
Red	Relegated

Premier Division performance by season, from 2001
Club	2001	2002	2003	2004	2005	2006	2007	2008	2009	2010	2011	2012	2013	2014	2015	2016	2017	2018	2019	2020	2021	2022	2023	2024	2025	2026
Bangor	1	1	2	3	4	6	11	7	4	2	6	11		4	9	3	1	4	1		3	7	8	4	1	7
Bethesda	12				11			9	12																10	
Brymbo	4	2	8	5	5	7	4	5	9	8	8	10	9	8	3	10	6	2	10		7	3	3	3	2	2
Chirk					12				11	12							10	12								
Connah's Quay	9	12					6	6	6	4	1	4	7	2	2	4	7	10	12							
Conwy																					11				9	
Denbigh											7	8	12		6	6	4	9	4		12		6	6	8	5
Dolgellau			12																							
Gresford																7	9	7	7		8	5	7	9		
Gwersyllt Park (Note: Gwersyllt Park resigned from the Premier Division after the 2007 season.)							9																	8	7	9
Halkyn	6	9	11																				9			
Hawarden Park	2	4	1	2	8	10	2	10	10	10	11		5	10	5	9	8	11								10
Llandudno	8	3	6	1	2	1	1	1	1	1	2	1	1	7	7	1	5	3	5		9	8	10	10		
Llanrwst				10	3	12		11	7	11			8	12		8	12									
Llay Welfare				12								12									10	12				
Marchwiel and Wrexham	10	11	5	11		3	12																			
Menai Bridge						8	3	4	8	6	4	2	2	1	1	2	2	1	2		2	1	4	7	5	3
Mochdre	11	10	3	9	7	4	10	2	2	9	5	3	3	5	4	5	11		3		5	10	5	1	3	4
Mold	3	5	7	4	1	5	8	8	5	5	9	9	6	11								9	11			8
Northop	5	6	10	6	6	11						7	11		12			5	6		4	4	2	5	6	6
Pontblyddyn	7	7	4	8	9	2	5	3	3	3	3	6	4	3	10	11			11			6	12			
Pwllheli											12			9	8	12		8	9		6	11				
St Asaph		8	9	7	10	9	7	12		7	10	5	10	6	11		3	6	8		1	2	1	2	4	1
References																				(Note: The COVID-19 pandemic forced a reduction in league activity. A replacement competition was organised for the latter part of the season when cricket became possible again, but with the winners not to be regarded as official league champions.)						
