= Tharindu Mendis =

Sri Lankan cricketer and coach (born 1981)

Personal information
- Born: 21 April 1981 (age 45); Colombo, Sri Lanka
- Relatives: Jeevan Mendis (brother)
- Source: ESPNcricinfo, 28 May 2018

Tharindu Mendis (born 21 April 1981) is a former Sri Lankan cricketer and currently coaches the Colombo District club. He has played in more than 100 first-class matches since 2000/01. He is also the elder brother of Sri Lankan national cricketer, Jeevan Mendis.

== Fixing allegations ==
Tharindu Mendis who turned his profession from cricketer to a cricket coach has been found guilty for involving in discussing with the match-fixers on planning to fix England's upcoming first Test against Sri Lanka in November 2018. He along with former Indian domestic cricketer Robin Morris and Pakistani domestic cricketer Hasan Raza were reported by Qatar news network, Al Jazeera for planning to tamper the pitch conditions at the Galle International Stadium prior to the start of the Test series between England and Sri Lanka in November 2018.

Sri Lanka Cricket (SLC) suspended Tharindu Mendis and the Galle groundsman Tharanga Indika with immediate effect following the controversy.
