= Zahir Abrahim =

South African cricketer (born 1972)

Personal information
- Born: 5 June 1972 (age 54); Robertson, South Africa
- Source: Cricinfo, 1 December 2020

Zahir Abrahim (born 5 June 1972) is a South African former cricketer. He played in 58 first-class, 66 List A, and 15 Twenty20 matches between 1995 and 2006.
