= Vyash Gobind =

South African cricketer

Personal information
- Full name: Vyash Gobind
- Born: 22 December 1984 (age 41); Durban, South Africa
- Batting: Left-handed
- Role: Right-arm medium-fast
- Relatives: Rivash Gobind (brother)

Domestic team information
- Years: Team
- 2004/05–2011/12: KwaZulu-Natal
- 2008/09–2009/10: Dolphins

Career statistics
Competition	FC	LA	T20
Matches	21	26	1
Runs scored	268	43	–
Batting average	9.92	14.33	–
100s/50s	0/0	0/0	–
Top score	37	14*	–
Balls bowled	2779	1053	19
Wickets	56	43	1
Bowling average	28.12	23.46	34.00
5 wickets in innings	1	0	0
10 wickets in match	0	0	0
Best bowling	5/38	4/39	1/34
Catches/stumpings	5/–	6/–	1/–
- Source: CricketArchive, 24 April 2016

Vyash Gobind (Note: Sometimes incorrectly spelt Viyash) (born 22 December 1984) is a South African cricketer who played first-class and List A cricket for KwaZulu-Natal and Dolphins. Vyash's older brother Rivash also played first-class and List A cricket for KwaZulu-Natal and Dolphins, as well as South Africa U-19s, and their father played club cricket in South Africa.

== Career ==
Aged 18, Gobind represented Dolphins U-19 in a warm up match against Bangladesh; Gobind took two wickets. In the same year, Gobind was diagnosed with testicular cancer. He survived, and said that he was inspired by testicular cancer survivors Dave Callaghan and Lance Armstrong. Gobind made his first-class debut in a 2004/05 UCB Provincial Cup match for KwaZulu-Natal against Northerns. He took 2/80 in the first innings, and 0/50 in the second innings. He made his List A debut in a 2007/08 Provincial One-Day Challenge match against Border; Gobind took 1/40 from 9 overs. Gobind played one Twenty20 match for Dolphins against Highveld Lions in the 2009/10 Pro20 Series; Gobind took 1/34 from 3.1 overs.

Gobind later played club cricket for Chatsworth Sporting Club. In a 2012/13 match for Chatsworth against Crusaders, Gobind took 3/34 from 8 overs, as Chatsworth were dismissed for 100.
