= Craig Sugden =

South African cricketer (born 1974)

Personal information
- Born: 7 March 1974 (age 52); Durban, South Africa
- Source: Cricinfo, 12 December 2020

Craig Sugden (born 7 March 1974) is a South African cricketer. He played in 56 first-class and 59 List A matches from 1993 to 2004.
