= Rodney Malamba =

South African cricketer

Personal information
- Full name: Rodney Lulamile Malamba
- Born: 11 March 1966 (age 60); Langa, Cape Town, South Africa
- Batting: Right-handed
- Bowling: Right-arm fast-medium

Domestic team information
- Years: Team
- 1988 to 1991: Natal

Career statistics
Competition	First-class
Matches	13
Runs scored	80
Batting average	6.15
100s/50s	0/0
Top score	22 not out
Balls bowled	2148
Wickets	35
Bowling average	31.62
5 wickets in innings	0
10 wickets in match	0
Best bowling	4/21
Catches/stumpings	6/0
- Source: ESPNcricinfo, 26 October 2019

Rodney Lulamile Malamba (born 11 March 1966 in Langa, Cape Town, Cape Province) is a former South African first-class cricketer who played for Natal from 1988 to 1991.

Malamba was a right-arm fast-medium bowler and right-handed tail-end batsman. His best first-class bowling figures were 3 for 64 and 4 for 21 for Natal B against Northern Transvaal in 1991–92.

He was the first black cricketer to play in the Currie Cup. His father, Ben Malamba, was an all-rounder who was one of the leading black cricketers of the apartheid era in South Africa.

He runs a cricket academy in Durban. In February 2020, he was named in South Africa's squad for the Over-50s Cricket World Cup in South Africa. However, the tournament was cancelled during the third round of matches due to the coronavirus pandemic.
