= Thamsanqa Khumalo =

South African cricketer (born 1999)

Personal information
- Born: 23 September 1999 (age 27)
- Source: Cricinfo, 14 January 2019

Thamsanqa Khumalo (born 23 September 1999) is a South African cricketer. He made his first-class debut for Dolphins in the 2018–19 CSA 4-Day Franchise Series on 14 January 2019. Prior to his first-class debut, he was part of South Africa's under-19 team that toured England in the summer of 2018. He made his List A debut for KwaZulu-Natal in the 2018–19 CSA Provincial One-Day Challenge on 24 March 2019.

In September 2019, he was named in KwaZulu-Natal's squad for the 2019–20 CSA Provincial T20 Cup. He made his Twenty20 debut for KwaZulu-Natal in the 2019–20 CSA Provincial T20 Cup on 13 September 2019. In April 2021, he was named in KwaZulu-Natal's squad, ahead of the 2021–22 cricket season in South Africa.
