= Bradley Barnes =

South African cricketer

Personal information
- Born: 20 October 1988 (age 38); Johannesburg, Transvaal Province, South Africa
- Batting: Right-handed
- Role: Wicket-Keeper

Domestic team information
- Years: Team
- 2007/08-2011/12: Kwa-Zulu Natal (squad no. 69)
- 2007/08-2011/12: Nashua Dolphins (squad no. 69)
- 2012/13-present: Western Province (squad no. 69)
- 2012/13-present: Cape Cobras
- Source: Cricinfo

Bradley Graeme Barnes (born 20 October 1988) is a South African cricketer who plays for the Cape Cobras. Barnes is a wicket-keeper and a versatile right-handed batsman who can open the batting or bat in the middle order.

== 2008 U-19 Cricket World Cup ==
Barnes featured in the 2008 U-19 Cricket World Cup scoring a reasonable 59 runs in four innings during the tournament at an average of 29.50, as well as effecting 9 dismissals as a wicket-keeper. However, the U-19 South Africans lost to India in the final by 12 runs by Duckworth/Lewis method.

== Domestic career ==
Barnes signed up with the Dolphins after the U-19 Cricket World Cup, and also played amateur cricket for Kwa-Zulu Natal. However, chances to represent the Dolphins were restricted due to the more established wicket-keeper Daryn Smit's success. Frustrated, Barnes moved to the Cape Cobras at the start of the 2012/13 season in search of more opportunities.
