= Mafinki Serame =

South African cricketer (born 1987)

Nkululeko Molate Serame (born 26 January 1987, in Klerksdorp) is a South African cricketer. He played in the 2006 Under-19 Cricket World Cup in Sri Lanka. He is an off-spinner in the classic mould and a lower order batsman.

Prior to the U19 World Cup Serame had already played List A cricket, making his first team debut in January 2006 for North West against Northerns. He took 1 wicket for 46 runs (1/46). He had a disappointing World Cup, in that in four matches he took one wicket at an average of 133.

Serame played for KwaZulu-Natal during the 2006–07 season, taking eight wickets at 30.25 in four first-class matches. He was selected for the South African Academy that toured Zimbabwe in August 2007. His best performance on tour and career to date came in the final one-day fixture when he took 5/25 in 10 overs.
