= Rivash Gobind =

South African cricketer

Personal information
- Born: 20 April 1982 (age 44); Durban, South Africa
- Batting: Left-handed
- Role: Batsman
- Relatives: Vyash Gobind (brother)

Domestic team information
- Years: Team
- 1999/00–2000/01: South Africa U-19
- 2000/01–2008/09: KwaZulu-Natal
- 2004/05–2008/09: Dolphins

Head coaching information
- Years: Team
- 2015/16: Dolphins
- 2025/26—present: Titans

Career statistics
Competition	First-class	List A
Matches	45	38
Runs scored	2,282	1018
Batting average	32.60	31.81
100s/50s	5/10	1/8
Top score	130*	101*
Balls bowled	31	3
Wickets	0	0
Bowling average	–	–
5 wickets in innings	–	–
10 wickets in match	–	–
Best bowling	–	–
Catches/stumpings	52/1	8/0
- Source: CricketArchive, 23 April 2016

Rivash Gobind (born 20 April 1982) is a South African cricket coach and former player. As a player, Gobind was a left-handed top order and opening batsman, who played for KwaZulu-Natal, Dolphins and South Africa U-19s; he captained both KwaZulu-Natal and South Africa U-19, and was the first Indian to captain a South African national cricket team.

== Personal life ==
Gobind attended Effingham Secondary School. He has a master's degree in business administration. Rivash's younger brother Vyash also played first-class and List A cricket for KwaZulu-Natal and Dolphins, and their father played club cricket in South Africa.

== Playing career ==
Gobind represented South Africa U-19s in the Plate competition of the 2000 Under-19 Cricket World Cup. He played in two matches, one a group stage match against Netherlands U-19, and one in the semi-final against Zimbabwe U-19. Gobind made his List A debut in December 2000 in a tour match for KwaZulu-Natal against a Sri Lankan team. Gobind scored 14 from 28 balls. In the same month, Gobind was appointed the captain of the South Africa U-19 team for a series against New Zealand U-19; in doing so, he became the first Indian to captain a South African national cricket team. The team included Stephen Cook, Hashim Amla and Imraan Khan. Gobind made his first-class debut in a 2001/02 SuperSport Series match against Northerns; opening the batting for KwaZulu-Natal, he made scores of 36 and 4.

In the 2005/06 season, Gobind captained the KwaZulu-Natal side. He moved up the Dolphins batting order to open the batting, and in a match for Dolphins against Cape Cobras, Gobind and Hashim Amla made a partnership of 201. Dolphins won the match. In a 2007/08 List A match for KwaZulu-Natal against Eastern Province, Gobind carried his bat with a score of 30* from 84 balls.

== Coaching career ==
Gobind has a level three coaching qualification. In 2012, he was appointed assistant coach of the Dolphins team under Lance Klusener, and helped the side win the 2013–14 Ram Slam T20 Challenge. He was the head coach of the Dolphins teams for the last six weeks of the 2015–16 Sunfoil Series. In August 2016, Gobind was appointed assistant coach of the Warriors on a three-year contract. In October 2019, Gobind left Warriors to become an assistant coach of the Afghanistan national cricket team. In January 2021, Gobind was appointed South Africa's performance analyst, ahead of their tour of Pakistan. He later held the same role for Zimbabwe, before being appointed head coach of South African club Titans ahead of the 2025/26 season.
