= Paul Randles (cricketer) =

South African cricketer

Personal information
- Full name: Paul John Leonard Randles
- Born: 21 May 1922; Pietermaritzburg, Natal, South Africa
- Died: 1 May 1979 (aged 56); Pietermaritzburg, Natal, South Africa
- Batting: Right-handed
- Role: Wicketkeeper-batsman

Domestic team information
- Years: Team
- 1952-53 to 1957-58: Natal

Career statistics
Competition	First-class
Matches	28
Runs scored	599
Batting average	17.11
100s/50s	0/2
Top score	67
Catches/stumpings	51/23
- Source: Cricinfo, 9 March 2020

Paul John Leonard Randles (21 May 1922 – 1 May 1979) was a South African cricketer, rugby player and lawyer. He played first-class cricket for Natal between 1952 and 1957.

Paul Randles was born in Pietermaritzburg in Natal and educated at Hilton College, where he was head boy. He volunteered in World War II, serving in the Umvoti Mounted Rifles. He was taken prisoner at the fall of Tobruk in June 1942 and held in several PoW camps in Italy (PG 60, PG 41, PG 49 and Dulag 226). When the Italian Armistice was announced on 8 September 1943 he was released by the camp commandant and remained a fugitive for four months. During December 1943 he was sheltered and fed by the Pellegrini family near San Donato Val di Comino. In January 1944 he was recaptured by the Germans and imprisoned in Stalag VII-A, Moosburg. Later that year, he was moved to Stalag IV-B, Mühlberg, and then to Stalag IV-G, Oschatz, a forced labour camp, where he remained until the end of the war.

After the war, Randles studied law and became senior partner in the law firm Randles Davis and Wood in Pietermaritzburg. He represented Natal at both rugby and cricket. He was Natal's wicket-keeper from 1952–53 to 1957–58. His most successful season was his first, when he scored 272 runs at an average of 22.66, including his highest first-class score of 67 against Orange Free State, and took 18 catches and 10 stumpings.
