= Gary Gilder =

South African cricketer (born 1974)

Personal information
- Full name: Gary Gilder
- Born: 6 July 1974 (age 52); Salisbury, Rhodesia, South Africa
- Batting: Right-handed
- Bowling: Left-arm fast-medium

Domestic team information
- Years: Team
- 1994–2002: KwaZulu-Natal
- 2003: Somerset

Career statistics
Competition	First-class	List A
Matches	51	55
Runs scored	408	123
Batting average	10.73	8.78
100s/50s	0/0	0/0
Top score	39	36
Balls bowled	8.251	2,267
Wickets	151	64
Bowling average	26.70	26.57
5 wickets in innings	6	1
10 wickets in match	2	n/a
Best bowling	8/22	6/25
Catches/stumpings	19/–	13/–
- Source: CricketArchive, 29 December 2016

Gary Michael Gilder (born 6 July 1974) is a former South African cricketer who played first-class and List A cricket for KwaZulu-Natal from 1994 to 2002 and for Somerset in 2003.

== Life and cricket career ==
Gary Gilder was born on 6 July 1974 in Salisbury, Rhodesia (now Harare, Zimbabwe). He made his first-class cricket debut for Natal B in January 1995 against Western Transvaal, taking five wickets in the match. The following season, he collected ten wickets in a match for the first time, taking five in each innings in a match against Free State B. He was selected as part of the South Africa A team to tour England in 1996, and during that tour he had his best bowling performance in first-class cricket, when he took eight wickets in one innings against Worcestershire. In the 1996–97 South African season, he made the step up to the Natal first-team, appearing in the SuperSport Series for the first time. He was a regular for Natal (KwaZulu Natal from 1998) until the 2001–02 season, when he appeared just once in the SuperSport Series. He ended his career in England, playing for Somerset County Cricket Club, though his appearances for the county were limited to six matches in July and August 2003.
