= Jason Oakes (cricketer) =

South African cricketer (born 1995)

Personal information
- Born: 7 April 1995 (age 31); Westville, South Africa
- Source: Cricinfo, 6 September 2015

Jason Oakes (born 7 April 1995) is a South African cricketer. He was included in the KwaZulu-Natal cricket team squad for the 2015 Africa T20 Cup. In September 2019, he was named in KwaZulu-Natal's squad for the 2019–20 CSA Provincial T20 Cup. In April 2021, he was named in North West's squad, ahead of the 2021–22 cricket season in South Africa.
