= Martin Benkenstein =

South African cricketer (born 1950)

Martin Benkenstein (born 30 June 1950 in Johannesburg, South Africa), is a former South African cricketer. A right-hand batsman, he represented both Natal and Rhodesia.

His youngest son Dale has played cricket for Natal, Durham, and South Africa, and his other two sons Brett and Boyd have also represented Natal at various times.
