= Andrew Tweedie =

South African cricketer (born 1975)

Andrew Neil Walter Tweedie (born 27 November 1975 in Durban) is a South African first class cricketer for the Nashua Dolphins. A right arm fast medium bowler, he has also had a stint at Herefordshire. Tweedie has been playing first class cricket since 1997–98 and has taken over 100 wickets.
