= Wade Wingfield =

South African cricketer (born 1977)

Personal information
- Full name: Wade Richard Wingfield
- Born: 17 December 1977 (age 48); Scottburgh, South Africa
- Batting: Right-handed
- Bowling: Right-arm medium

Domestic team information
- Years: Team
- 1997/98–2000/01: KwaZulu-Natal
- 2002/03–2003/04: Eastern Province
- 2003/04–2004/05: Dolphins
- 2004/05–2005/06: KwaZulu-Natal
- First-class debut: 30 October 1997 Natal B v Western Province B
- Last First-class: 2 February 2006 KwaZulu-Natal v Western Province

Career statistics
Competition	First-class	List A
Matches	43	66
Runs scored	1,936	1,479
Batting average	35.85	32.86
100s/50s	1/10	0/9
Top score	146*	85
Balls bowled	2,202	1,602
Wickets	23	42
Bowling average	46.95	30.95
5 wickets in innings	0	0
10 wickets in match	0	0
Best bowling	2/18	4/42
Catches/stumpings	20/–	18/–
- Source: CricketArchive, 1 April 2011

Wade Richard Wingfield (born 17 December 1977) is a South African former cricketer. He played over 40 first-class matches in his career, mostly for KwaZulu-Natal. In the 2001 season, Wingfield was the professional player for Nelson Cricket Club in the Lancashire League.
