= Doug Watson (cricketer) =

South African cricketer (born 1973)

Personal information
- Born: 15 May 1973 (age 53); Pietermaritzburg, South Africa
- Batting: Right-handed
- Bowling: Right-arm medium
- Role: Batsman

Head coaching information
- Years: Team
- 2012–2015: Namibia
- 2023–present: Scotland
- Source: ESPNcricinfo

Douglas James Watson (born 15 May 1973) is a former South African cricketer who played domestic cricket for KwaZulu-Natal Inland. He has previously represented South Africa A, Derbyshire and Dolphins. He is also a former coach of the Dolphins.

In 2023, Watson was appointed head coach of the Scotland national cricket team on a short-term contract covering the 2023 Cricket World Cup Qualifier and 2023 Men's T20 World Cup Europe Qualifier.
