= Dale Benkenstein =

South African cricketer and coach (born 1974)

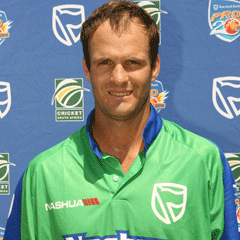

Personal information
- Full name: Dale Martin Benkenstein
- Born: 9 June 1974 (age 52); Salisbury, Rhodesia
- Batting: Right-handed
- Bowling: Right arm medium, off break
- Relatives: Martin Benkenstein (father); Luc Benkenstein (son)

International information
- National side: South Africa
- ODI debut (cap 51): 25 October 1998 v England
- Last ODI: 6 October 2002 v Bangladesh

Domestic team information
- Years: Team
- 1993–2004: Natal
- 2004–2010: Dolphins
- 2005–2014: Durham

Career statistics
Competition	ODI	FC	LA	T20
Matches	23	264	300	99
Runs scored	305	15,962	7,308	1,769
Batting average	17.94	44.21	35.13	24.23
100s/50s	0/1	38/86	1/44	0/6
Top score	69	259	107*	60
Balls bowled	65	7,577	3,197	468
Wickets	4	100	87	21
Bowling average	11.00	36.15	30.81	27.57
5 wickets in innings	0	0	0	0
10 wickets in match	0	0	0	0
Best bowling	3/5	4/16	4/16	3/10
Catches/stumpings	3/–	169/–	113/–	32/–
Medal record
Representing South Africa
Men's Cricket
Commonwealth Games
Gold medal – first place	1998 Kuala Lumpur	List-A cricket
- Source: CricketArchive, 13 February 2014

Dale Martin Benkenstein (born 9 June 1974) is a South African former cricketer who was an all-rounder. He is also a former first-team coach at Lancashire and Hampshire. Benkenstein was a member of the South Africa team that won the 1998 ICC KnockOut Trophy. He is appointed by BCB as the Batting Coach of Bangladesh National Cricket Team on 09 November 2026

== Early life ==
Benkenstein was born in Salisbury, Rhodesia (now Harare, Zimbabwe), the son of Martin Benkenstein, who had played for Rhodesia in the Currie Cup in the 1970s. In 1980, around the time of Zimbabwean independence, Martin moved his family to Durban, South Africa. There, Benkenstein attended Durban Preparatory High School, Durban High School and Michaelhouse schools. He captained the SA Schools side in 1992, and led the SA Colts team to the West Indies in the same year.

== Domestic career ==
=== Natal ===
Benkenstein made his debut at the age of 18 for Natal in the 1993/94 season, playing under the tutelage of Malcolm Marshall. Marshall's analytical captaincy style made an impression on the young Benkenstein, who was later quoted as saying "In my eyes, he took the art of captaincy to another level." When Marshall left Natal at the end of the 1996 season, Benkenstein, still only 22, was selected to succeed him as captain. While he got off to an unsteady start as captain, with Natal being heavily defeated by Border in his first game at the helm, he later recovered and led the team to win both the four-day and one-day domestic competitions.

=== Durham ===
When Benkenstein joined Durham for the 2005 season, he collected the club's player of the year award during his first attempt. During this time he also filled in as skipper for the absent Mike Hussey and Paul Collingwood. He went on to score 1,427 runs, which was a run scoring record at Durham until his mark was overtaken by Michael Di Venuto in 2009.

Dale has been quoted as to saying 2008 may be his last season in the sport as he wants to spend more time with his wife Jacqueline and children in Consett.

== International career ==
Benkenstein had represented his country many times as a junior, including a stint as captain of the South African Schools side, and in the under-19 development team. Benkenstein's senior ODI debut for South Africa came against England at Dhaka in 1998/99, when the teams were playing in the quarter-final of the Wills International Cup. Despite some useful contributions, including 69 against the West Indies at Cape Town in 1998 and 3/5 against Kenya in the 2002/03 ICC Champions Trophy tournament, he never managed to establish himself as a permanent member of the team. Benkenstein later admitted that he had not taken full advantage of the opportunities that came his way at the international level.

== Coaching career ==
Benkenstein was named coach of Hampshire in February 2014, having worked as a batting coach for the South African side Dolphins. He left his coaching role at Hampshire in July 2016 due to family reasons. After returning to South Africa he became head coach at Hilton College where he worked with 2019 Hilton head boy, and future Hampshire County Cricket Club bowler, John Turner.

In May 2021, Benkenstein joined Lancashire as batting coach on a short-term contract. In November 2021 he was named head coach of Gloucestershire on a three-year contract.

He was appointed head coach of Lancashire in 2023. Benkenstein left the role by mutual consent in May 2025, with the club seventh in division two of the County Championship at the halfway point of the season.

In March 2026, Benkenstein was appointed as a batting consultant at Durham.

== Awards ==
Benkenstein was named one of the Wisden Cricketers of the Year in 2009, based on his work with Durham in the English county championship.

== Style ==
Benkenstein was a right-handed batsman, and a right-arm off-break or right-arm medium pace bowler.

== Career best performances ==
Updated 19 July 2011

	Batting				Bowling			
	Score	Fixture	Venue	Season	Score	Fixture	Venue	Season
ODI	69	South Africa v West Indies	Cape Town	1999	3–5	South Africa v Kenya	Colombo (RPS)	2002
FC	259	KwaZulu-Natal v Northerns	Durban	2005	4–16	Dolphins v Warriors	Durban	2005
LA	107*	Natal v North West	Fochville	1997	4–16	Durham v Surrey	Chester-le-Street	2005
T20	60	Durham v Lancashire	Chester-le-Street	2011	3–10	Durham v Yorkshire	Leeds	2005

Sporting positions
Preceded by Giles White	Hampshire cricket coach 2014–2016	Succeeded by Craig White
