= Commonwealth XI cricket team in South Africa in 1959–60 =

A Commonwealth XI cricket team toured South Africa in October and November 1959, playing three first-class matches. Captained by Denis Compton, the Commonwealth XI included several well-known players such as Tom Graveney, Brian Close, Bert Sutcliffe, Frank Tyson, Godfrey Evans, Roy Marshall, Bob Simpson and Ian Craig.

The first match was against Transvaal at the New Wanderers Stadium in Johannesburg and this was drawn after Jonathan Fellows-Smith scored a century in each innings for Transvaal. Next, the Commonwealth XI defeated a Combined Transvaal XI by 3 wickets at the Loftus Versfeld Stadium in Pretoria. In the third and final first-class game, the Commonwealth XI played a South African Invitation XI at the New Wanderers and saved a draw after having to follow-on.

== Touring team ==
Player	Date of birth	Batting style	Bowling style	Nationality
Denis Compton (c)	23 May 1918	Right-hand	Left-arm unorthodox spin	England
Brian Close	24 February 1931	Left-hand	Right-arm medium	England
Ian Craig	12 June 1935	Right-hand	-	Australia
Godfrey Evans	18 August 1920	Right-hand	Wicket-keeper	England
Tom Graveney	16 June 1927	Right-hand	Right-arm legbreak	England
Roy Marshall	25 April 1930	Right-hand	Right-arm offbreak	Barbados
Peter Philpott	21 November 1934	Right-hand	Right-arm legbreak	Australia
Harold Rhodes	22 July 1936	Right-hand	Right arm fast	England
Bob Simpson	3 February 1936	Right-hand	Right-arm legbreak	Australia
Bert Sutcliffe	17 November 1923	Left-hand	Slow left-arm orthodox	New Zealand
Frank Tyson	6 June 1930	Right-hand	Right arm fast	England
Colin Ingleby-Mackenzie	15 September 1933	Left-hand	Right-arm offbreak	England

Australian all-rounder Keith Miller was initially in the squad as captain, but later has to withdraw from the tour due to fitness. He was replaced as captain by Denis Compton. New Zealand test captain, John R. Reid, was also invited to join the tour, but declined for business reasons.

== Results ==
16-19 October 1959
scorecard

Transvaal	v	Commonwealth XI
285 (86.1 overs); Jonathan Fellows-Smith 100*; Bob Simpson 4/38 (15.1 overs)		299 (88.1 overs); Denis Compton 68; Mike Macaulay 4/52 (18 overs)
247/7d (82 overs); Jonathan Fellows-Smith 102*; Frank Tyson 4/53 (19 overs)		59/0 (18.2 overs); Ian Craig 33*

Match drawn
Wanderers Stadium, Johannesburg
Umpires: William Anderson and JD Forsyth

- Transvaal won the toss and decided to bat
- 3-day match

23-26 October 1959
scorecard

Combined Transvaal XI	v	Commonwealth XI
332 (102 overs); Ken Funston 85; Peter Philpott 5/117 (28 overs)		345 (93.3 overs); Ian Craig 126; Brian Thorp 5/64 (18 overs)
254/6d (76 overs); Tiger Lance 78; Peter Philpott 3/47 (19 overs)		242/7 (66.1 overs); Tom Graveney 100*; Godfrey Steyn 3/75 (29.1 overs)

Commonwealth XI won by 3 wickets
Loftus Versfeld, Pretoria
Umpires: George Fitzpatrick and George Hawkins

- Combined Transvaal XI won the toss and decided to bat
- 3-day match

30 October-2 November 1959
scorecard

South African Invitation XI	v	Commonwealth XI
434/5d (96.3 overs); John Waite 128; Harold Rhodes 2/60 (23 overs)		236 (72.4 overs); Denis Compton 74*; Neil Adcock 3/26 (14 overs)
		269/4 f/o (82 overs); Tom Graveney 102*; Jonathan Fellows-Smith 2/32 (12 overs)

Match drawn
Wanderers Stadium, Johannesburg
Umpires: Alfred Birkett and Hayward Kidson

- Commonwealth XI won the toss and decided to field
- 3-day match
