= Jim Pothecary =

South African cricketer (1933–2016)

Personal information
- Full name: James Edward Pothecary
- Batting: Right-handed
- Bowling: Right-arm medium

International information
- National side: South Africa
- Test debut: 7 July 1960 v England
- Last Test: 18 August 1960 v England

Career statistics
Competition	Test	First-class
Matches	3	54
Runs scored	26	1,039
Batting average	6.50	15.74
100s/50s	0/0	0/2
Top score	12	81*
Balls bowled	828	10,329
Wickets	9	143
Bowling average	39.33	28.34
5 wickets in innings	0	2
10 wickets in match	0	0
Best bowling	4/58	5/29
Catches/stumpings	2/–	42/–
- Source: Cricinfo, 15 November 2022

James Edward Pothecary (6 December 1933 – 11 May 2016) was a South African cricketer who played in three Test matches in 1960. He was born in Cape Town, Cape Province and died there too.

Jim Pothecary showed early promise when as a 16-year-old he took all 20 wickets in a match: 10 for 18 and 10 for 36 for his club Seapoint against Lansdowne in Cape Town in the 1950–51 season. He matured into a useful right-handed lower-order batsman and a right-arm medium pace bowler who played for several seasons for Western Province in South African domestic cricket without particular distinction. But in 1959–60, he took 25 wickets at the low average of 14 runs per wicket, and was selected for the 1960 South African tour to England.

He had a disappointing tour, as did most of the South African side, and was not in the first-choice team that contested the first two Test matches. But the controversy that blew up over the fast bowler Geoff Griffin, who was called by several umpires for throwing, meant there was a vacancy to partner opening bowler Neil Adcock in the last three Tests, and Pothecary was called up. He failed to take a wicket in his first match, at Trent Bridge, but at Old Trafford he took five wickets in the drawn match. Even better followed at The Oval, where Pothecary took four wickets in the England first innings, and Adcock took six, as the home team were bowled out for just 155. But though South Africa had a first innings lead of 264, they were unable to force victory, and Pothecary failed to take a wicket in England's second innings, which opened with a partnership of 290 by Geoff Pullar and Colin Cowdrey.

Pothecary played in South African cricket until 1964–65 but was chosen for no more Tests.
