= Graham Bunyard =

South African cricketer

Personal information
- Full name: Graham Stuart Bunyard
- Born: 17 October 1939; Port Elizabeth, Cape Province, South Africa
- Died: 10 May 2018 (aged 78); Plettenberg Bay, Western Cape Province, South Africa
- Batting: Right-handed
- Bowling: Right-arm fast

Domestic team information
- Years: Team
- 1959–60 to 1960–61: Transvaal
- 1962–63: Rhodesia

Career statistics
Competition	First-class
Matches	14
Runs scored	192
Batting average	13.71
100s/50s	0/0
Top score	35
Balls bowled	2358
Wickets	48
Bowling average	22.54
5 wickets in innings	1
10 wickets in match	0
Best bowling	5/35
Catches/stumpings	7/–
- Source: Cricinfo, 13 May 2018

Graham Stuart Bunyard (17 October 1939 – 10 May 2018) was a South African cricketer who played first-class cricket from 1959 to 1963.

A fast bowler, Bunyard made his first-class debut for Transvaal in the 1959–60 season, on the day before he turned 20. His first two wickets were Denis Compton and Godfrey Evans. In his third match he took 5 for 35 against Rhodesia. He finished the season with 23 wickets in seven matches at an average of 21.78. He was one of the pace bowlers considered for selection for the tour to England in 1960 and later as a replacement during the tour when Geoff Griffin could no longer bowl, but he was not selected.

Bunyard took 16 wickets at 24.31 in five matches in 1960–61 and toured England in 1961 with the South African Fezela XI of promising young players. He took 3 for 48 and 3 for 42 to help the Fezelas to an innings victory in the first-class match against Combined Services. However, he played only one more first-class match, for Rhodesia two years later, when he was still only 23 years old. His last three wickets were Norm O'Neill, John Reid and Bill Alley.

Bunyard became a tobacco farmer in Schagen, about 20 kilometres west of Nelspruit, in north-eastern Transvaal.

== Sources ==
- Alfred, L. (2003) Testing Times: The Story of the Men who Made SA Cricket, Spearhead: Claremont, South Africa. ISBN 9780864865380.
