= International cricket in 1961 =

International cricket season

The 1961 International cricket season was from May 1961 to August 1961.

== Season overview ==
International tours
Start date	Home team	Away team	Results [Matches]			
Start date	Home team	Away team	Test	ODI	FC	LA
8 June 1961	England	Australia	1–2 [5]	—	—	—
14 June 1961	England	South Africa	—	—	0–3 [3]	—
12 August 1961	Scotland	Denmark	—	—	1–0 [1]	—

== June ==
=== Australia in England ===
The Ashes Test series
No.	Date	Home captain	Away captain	Venue	Result
Test 507	8–13 June	Colin Cowdrey	Richie Benaud	Edgbaston Cricket Ground, Birmingham	Match drawn
Test 508	22–26 June	Colin Cowdrey	Neil Harvey	Lord's, London	Australia by 5 wickets
Test 509	6–8 July	Peter May	Richie Benaud	Headingley Cricket Ground, Leeds	England by 8 wickets
Test 510	27 Jul–1 August	Peter May	Richie Benaud	Old Trafford Cricket Ground, Manchester	Australia by 54 runs
Test 511	17–22 August	Peter May	Richie Benaud	Kennington Oval, London	Match drawn

=== South Africa in England ===
3-day Match Series
No.	Date	Home captain	Away captain	Venue	Result
Match 1	14–16 June	(Essex) Brian Taylor	Roy McLean	Ransome, Hoffman and Pollard Sports and Social Club Ground, Chelmsford	Fezela by 6 wickets
Match 2	28–30 June	Maurice Fenner	Roy McLean	United Services Recreation Ground, Portsmouth	Fezela by an innings and 131 runs
Match 3	1–4 July	(Gloucestershire) Martin Young	Roy McLean	The Royal & Sun Alliance County Ground, Bristol	Fezela by an innings and 65 runs

== August ==
=== Denmark in Scotland ===
Two-day Match
No.	Date	Home captain	Away captain	Venue	Result
Match	12–14 August	James Brown	NP Kristensen	Titwood, Glasgow	Scotland by an innings and 24 runs
