= International cricket in 1955 =

International cricket season

The 1955 International cricket season was from April 1955 to August 1955.

== Season overview ==
International tours
Start date	Home team	Away team	Results [Matches]			
Start date	Home team	Away team	Test	ODI	FC	LA
9 June 1955	England	South Africa	3–2 [5]	—	—	—
20 August 1955	Netherlands	Denmark	—	—	0–0 [1]	—

== June ==
=== South Africa in England ===
Test series
No.	Date	Home captain	Away captain	Venue	Result
Test 407	9–13 June	Peter May	Jack Cheetham	Trent Bridge, Nottingham	England by an innings and 5 runs
Test 409	23–27 June	Peter May	Jackie McGlew	Lord's, London	England by 71 runs
Test 410	7–12 July	Peter May	Jackie McGlew	Old Trafford Cricket Ground, Manchester	South Africa by 3 wickets
Test 411	21–26 July	Peter May	Jackie McGlew	Headingley Cricket Ground, Leeds	South Africa by 224 runs
Test 412	13–17 August	Peter May	Jack Cheetham	Kennington Oval, London	England by 92 runs

== August ==
=== Denmark in Netherlands ===
Two-day Match
No.	Date	Home captain	Away captain	Venue	Result
Match	20–21 August	Wally van Weelde	E Knudsen	The Hague	Match drawn
