= International cricket in 1960 =

International cricket season

The 1960 international cricket season ran from April 1960 to August 1960.

== Season overview ==
International tours
Start date	Home team	Away team	Results [Matches]			
Start date	Home team	Away team	Test	ODI	FC	LA
9 June 1960	England	South Africa	3–0 [5]	—	—	—
30 July 1960	Denmark	Netherlands	—	—	0–1 [1]	—

== June ==
=== South Africa in England ===
Test series
No.	Date	Home captain	Away captain	Venue	Result
Test 492	9–14 June	Colin Cowdrey	Jackie McGlew	Edgbaston Cricket Ground, Birmingham	England by 100 runs
Test 493	23–27 June	Colin Cowdrey	Jackie McGlew	Lord's, London	England by an innings and 73 runs
Test 494	7–11 July	Colin Cowdrey	Jackie McGlew	Trent Bridge, Nottingham	England by 8 wickets
Test 495	21–26 July	Colin Cowdrey	Jackie McGlew	Old Trafford Cricket Ground, Manchester	Match drawn
Test 496	18–23 August	Colin Cowdrey	Jackie McGlew	Kennington Oval, London	Match drawn

== July ==
=== Netherlands in Denmark ===
Two-day Match
No.	Date	Home captain	Away captain	Venue	Result
Match	30–31 July	NP Kristensen	Peter van Arkel	Gentofte Stadium, Copenhagen	Netherlands by 3 wickets
