= D'Oliveira affair =

1968–1969 cricketing controversy

Basil D'Oliveira, the England player of South African Cape Coloured background around whom the controversy centred, pictured in 1968

The D'Oliveira affair was a prolonged political and sporting controversy relating to the scheduled 1968–69 tour of South Africa by the England cricket team, who were officially representing the Marylebone Cricket Club (MCC). (Note: At the time official English touring teams played under the name, colours and badge of the MCC and were only styled "England" during Test matches.) The point of contention was whether the England selectors would include Basil D'Oliveira, a mixed-race South African player who had represented England in Test cricket since 1966, having moved there six years earlier. With South Africa under apartheid, the potential inclusion by England of a non-white South African in their tour party became a political issue.

A Cape Coloured of Indian and Portuguese ancestry, D'Oliveira left South Africa primarily because the era's apartheid legislation seriously restricted his career prospects on racial grounds and barred him from the all-white Test team. He qualified for Worcestershire County Cricket Club through residency in 1964 and first played for England two years later. The consequences of D'Oliveira's possible inclusion in the 1968–69 MCC tour of South Africa were discussed by English and South African cricketing bodies as early as 1966. Manoeuvring by cricketing and political figures in both countries did little to bring the matter to a head. The MCC's priority was to maintain traditional links with South Africa and have the series go ahead without incident. South Africa's Prime Minister John Vorster sought to appease international opinion by publicly indicating that D'Oliveira's inclusion would be acceptable, but secretly did all he could to prevent it.

D'Oliveira was omitted from the England team for part of 1968 amid a slump in his batting form, but he marked his return in late August with a score of 158 runs in England's final Test match of the year, against Australia at The Oval. Days later, the MCC selectors omitted D'Oliveira from the team to tour South Africa; they insisted that this was based entirely on cricketing merit, but many in Britain voiced apprehension and there was a public outcry. After Tom Cartwright's withdrawal because of injury on 16 September, the MCC chose D'Oliveira as a replacement, prompting accusations from Vorster and other South African politicians that the selection was politically motivated. Attempts to find a compromise followed, but these led nowhere. The MCC announced the tour's cancellation on 24 September.

Sporting boycotts of South Africa were already under way by 1968, but the D'Oliveira controversy was the first to have a serious effect on South African cricket. The South African Cricket Board of Control announced its intention to remove racial barriers in South African cricket in 1969, and formally integrated the sport in 1976. Meanwhile, the boycott movement escalated sharply, leading to South Africa's near-complete isolation from international cricket from 1971, though the country continued to play international rugby into the 1980s, twice allowing mixed-race New Zealand rugby teams into the country during the 1970s. D'Oliveira played for England until 1972, and for Worcestershire until 1979. South Africa returned to international cricket in 1991, soon after apartheid began to be dismantled.

== Background ==
=== South Africa ===
From the time that European settlers first arrived in South Africa in 1652, the country was divided on racial lines, in common with similar settlements. In contrast to other European colonies, racial distinction and segregation intensified during the early 20th century, and the various ethnic groups became more sharply defined and divided. Following its general election victory in 1948, the National Party, led by Daniel Malan, formalised this racism under a government policy called apartheid. Under apartheid, different races were kept apart in all aspects of life. This system was thoroughly enforced during the 1950s; any resistance from non-white races was put down and laws, supposedly to prevent the rise of communism, were passed to prevent political agitation.

From a cricketing viewpoint, the apartheid policy made little difference. Although cricket was played widely among the different racial groups in South Africa, the Test team, which represented the country in international matches, had always been all white. (Note: Controversy exists regarding the ancestry of C. B. Llewellyn, who played for South Africa between 1896 and 1912; a biographical article published in 1976 contending that he was coloured was vehemently censured by his descendants, who insisted that he had been of "pure British stock".) Under apartheid, this became official policy under the government reasoning that black, coloured (mixed race) and Indian players were inherently inferior and not worthy of selection. Different races were forbidden from competing against each other. South African cricket teams did not compete against India, Pakistan or the West Indies, but teams from England, Australia and New Zealand continued to visit the country. English cricketers particularly enjoyed tours to South Africa owing to the hospitality they received and the quality of living. The political writer and historian Peter Oborne commented: "Relations between the cricket establishments of the two countries were exceptionally warm. Only few visitors noticed, and even fewer cared, that there was something wrong."

During the Marylebone Cricket Club (MCC) tour of South Africa during 1948–49, the first under apartheid, the BBC commentator John Arlott was horrified when he saw a black man assaulted for no reason. This prompted him to visit several townships where he found black people living in very poor conditions. He contrasted this unfavourably with the luxury of the homes where he was entertained by white families. Billy Griffith, one of the touring team, accompanied him on one visit to a township, and was similarly appalled, but did not speak out against it. Arlott later condemned apartheid, during a 1950 BBC broadcast, and refused to commentate during future tours to the country. His example was followed by the England batsman and clergyman David Sheppard, who declined to tour South Africa, refused to play the team in 1960, and spoke out publicly against the policies of the South African government despite efforts by the MCC to silence him. Otherwise, there was little protest in England against South African cricket during the 1950s.

=== Britain and the England cricket team ===
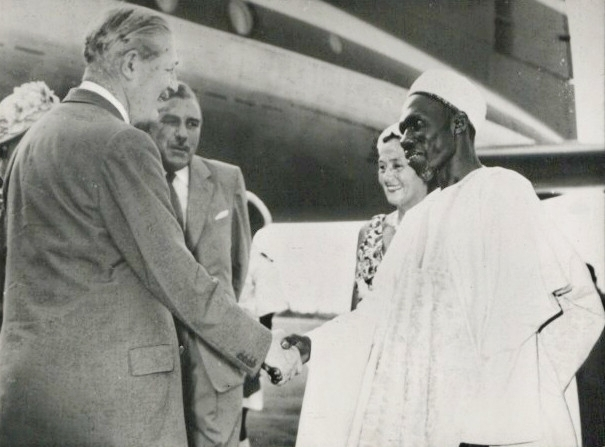
UK Prime Minister Harold Macmillan (left) visits Nigeria in 1960. British attitudes towards race and apartheid were shifting greatly at this time.

From the mid-1950s, the United Nations began to express concern over apartheid, and there was a growing general awareness in Britain of its effects. In 1960 the UK Prime Minister, Harold Macmillan, criticised apartheid in his "Wind of Change" speech to the South African parliament. (Note: Macmillan stressed the rising black nationalist ambitions across Africa, made clear Britain's intent to grant independence to its remaining colonies and urged the South African government to work towards eventually creating a society "in which individual merit, and individual merit alone, is the criterion for a man's advancement". The speech and its theme had been widely anticipated in South Africa, but the frank tone of Macmillan's delivery surprised many. The parliamentarians received the speech coldly.) However, the British government was cautious; the large number of British passport holders and businesses based in South Africa made them reluctant to force the issue and provoke a confrontation. Additionally, there was support for the policy among some right-wing politicians. When the MCC team toured South Africa in 1956–57, the players observed and were shocked by what they considered to be injustices against the black population. As many players and officials had family and friends in the country, they were disinclined to take a stand, but several condemned the situation in print at the time or later.

Overall attitudes in Britain towards South African cricket began to change in the 1960s. At the time, race was becoming a more emotive matter in Britain and immigration from Asia and the Caribbean became an issue in general elections. Racial tensions had risen throughout the 1950s, and race riots had occurred. Tim Quelch, in his review of English cricket in the 1950s, suggests that "[England's] record on race relations had hardly been exemplary". But Jack Williams, in his book Cricket and Race, suggests that cricket was a force for racial harmony in England given the influx of African-Caribbean and Asian overseas players and the mingling of white and African-Caribbean supporters during several Test series between England and the West Indies. Against this background, when the South African team toured England in 1960, there were some protests against apartheid.

=== International sport ===
Within South Africa, there was growing realisation among opponents of apartheid that sport could play a role in pressuring the government. During the 1950s, South Africa competed freely in international competition; the governing bodies of the major international sports recognised only the official, all-white South African institutions. By the end of the decade, this began to change. Several non-white sporting organisations within South Africa united and began to influence international opinion. The resulting pressure brought about the suspension of the all-white Football Association of South Africa from FIFA—for two years from 1961, then after a brief reinstatement, again from 1964—which prevented South Africa from participating in the 1966 World Cup. South Africa was also excluded from international fencing in 1964. However, because neither fencing nor football was closely followed in white South Africa, the impact was limited. Suspension from the Olympics had a greater effect; another campaign from within South Africa and the consequent change in international opinion resulted in South Africa being barred from the 1964 Olympics and those that followed.

In 1966, before a tour by the New Zealand rugby team, the South African government asked New Zealand to field an all-white team (thereby excluding Māori players); the New Zealand Rugby Football Union refused and cancelled the tour. As rugby was very popular among white South Africans, this caused concern in that community. The England cricket team was in New Zealand at the time, and Billy Griffith, by then the secretary of the MCC, when questioned said that the MCC would also cancel in similar circumstances. Despite these events in other world sports, South Africa continued to play international cricket. Efforts to put pressure on the International Cricket Conference (ICC) failed, and even when South Africa withdrew from the Commonwealth in 1961 (theoretically forfeiting the national team's Test status), their traditional opponents continued to play official Tests against them despite opposition from India, Pakistan and the West Indies.

=== Basil D'Oliveira ===
Basil D'Oliveira was born in Cape Town in 1931 and, coming from a mixed Indian-Portuguese background, formed part of the Cape Coloured community. He demonstrated skill in cricket from an early age, but as the apartheid system classified him as non-white, he was barred from playing first-class cricket in South Africa or representing the national team. He represented and captained a "non-white" South African team which played unofficial international matches. He was left distraught by the cancellation in 1959, at the behest of South African anti-apartheid campaigners, of a proposed visit by a West Indies team which was to compete against non-white sides. Realising that he had achieved all he could as a non-white sportsman in South Africa, he wrote to John Arlott in England to ask for help finding employment as a cricketer.

Arlott enlisted the help of John Kay, a cricket journalist with expertise in the Lancashire leagues, to find a job for D'Oliveira as a club professional. No teams were initially interested, but when Middleton's professional withdrew at the last minute, the club employed D'Oliveira for the 1960 season. After a poor start, he prospered for Middleton. He established a wider reputation by playing televised matches for a team called the "Cavaliers", and took part in overseas tours with some leading cricketers. Several English county cricket clubs expressed an interest in him, and he eventually joined Worcestershire. Qualifying for the county team through residency, (Note: At the time, cricketers had to have lived in a county for a year to qualify to play for that team.) he made his debut in 1964 and scored a century on his first appearance. By the 1966 season, he had progressed to the point that he was picked for England Test team. D'Oliveira was immediately successful for England; by the following year he was well-established in the team.

== Build-up ==
=== Anticipation ===
From early in his England career, D'Oliveira and his supporters saw the MCC tour of South Africa in 1968–69 as potentially being a key moment in his career. Guy Fraser-Sampson suggests: "Nobody could be in any doubt that the possibility of D'Oliveira being chosen as a member of the England touring party would raise massive political complications". When D'Oliveira visited South Africa to work as a coach in 1966, the subject was raised continually. People speculated whether D'Oliveira would be selected and, if so, whether the South African government would allow him to play. Some of his supporters worried that his acceptance of a place on a tour to South Africa might be interpreted as approval of the political situation there, but D'Oliveira was determined to play, aware of what it would mean to the non-white people of South Africa. In 1967, Griffith flew to South Africa to discuss the forthcoming tour and to seek a solution to any potential problems—the MCC wanted the tour to go ahead without any political trouble. Little came of the meetings; Oborne suggests that both sides simply "agreed to hope that the whole issue went away".

After a successful season for England in 1967, D'Oliveira was chosen to tour the West Indies in 1967–68; this raised awareness in England and South Africa that he was a realistic contender to tour South Africa a year later. However, his opportunities to excel were few in the West Indies; circumstances were against him in several matches, and he had a statistically poor tour. Any mitigating circumstances were offset by problems off the field. D'Oliveira took full advantage of the social opportunities available on a tour of the West Indies and frequently disappeared to parties and other events, often not reappearing until after breakfast. Rumours to this effect reached the press and the MCC tour manager spoke to D'Oliveira about his responsibilities on tour. D'Oliveira said that his behaviour and poor form were partly a result of the pressure placed on him. He was frequently questioned about the South African tour and about race—some groups in the West Indies accused him of "selling out" by playing for England's "white" team.

=== South Africa's position ===
The position of the South African government towards mixed-race teams was well established by 1967. It was stated explicitly after the visit of Griffith when, in February 1967, the Interior Minister P. K. Le Roux said in a speech: "We will not allow mixed teams to play against our white teams here. That is our policy. It is well known here and overseas." These comments caused a public row in Britain, and some commentators wanted the tour to be called off; the MCC informed the British government that players would be selected on ability alone and that any attempts from within South Africa to interfere would cause the tour to be cancelled. Denis Howell, the Minister for Sport, informed the House of Commons of the MCC position and stated that the government expected that the MCC would cancel the tour if any player were to be rejected. Privately, the MCC committee were unhappy to have been forced into so unequivocal a position.

B. J. Vorster, the Prime Minister of South Africa, was embarrassed by Le Roux's public comments and forced him to deny having made them. However, the British government's intervention cemented in Vorster's mind the idea that it and the MCC were closely connected. In April 1967 he gave a speech in which he said that while sport between white and non-white teams could not take place in South Africa, the government would be prepared to send mixed teams to play abroad and to accommodate mixed teams from South Africa's "traditional" opponents. This change of direction was aimed at entering a team in the 1968 Olympics, to avoid a repeat of the cancelled New Zealand rugby tour and with D'Oliveira's selection in mind. The MCC decided later in 1967 to clarify that Vorster's government would impose no limitations on the players chosen for the tour. In January 1968, Griffith wrote on behalf of the MCC to the South African Cricket Association (SACA) with the implication that the tour would be cancelled if a free selection was not guaranteed.

According to Oborne, Vorster was a pragmatic politician who wanted to maintain apartheid and to make it appear acceptable to the outside world. To this end, attempting to broaden South Africa's international connections, he accepted black foreign diplomats in the country and began to plan a policy to allow mixed-race sport to prevent South Africa's international isolation. However, such policies were unpopular with his domestic supporters and he was careful not to go too far. Oborne writes: "Vorster knew that there was a limit to how far he could go without imperilling his own position. That limit was Basil D'Oliveira." According to Oborne, Vorster never intended to allow D'Oliveira to play with the MCC team; his supporters would not have accepted a non-white South African benefiting from this change of policy and demonstrating his ability at a high level. Vorster therefore worked to give the impression overseas that D'Oliveira would be welcome, while at the same time doing his utmost to stop him from playing. He courted the British ambassador, Sir John Nicholls, and told him that a tour party including D'Oliveira would be acceptable. Nicholls passed this on to the UK government. Vorster meanwhile monitored D'Oliveira's progress closely; from his debut in 1966, South Africa kept a security file on him.

=== MCC manoeuvres ===
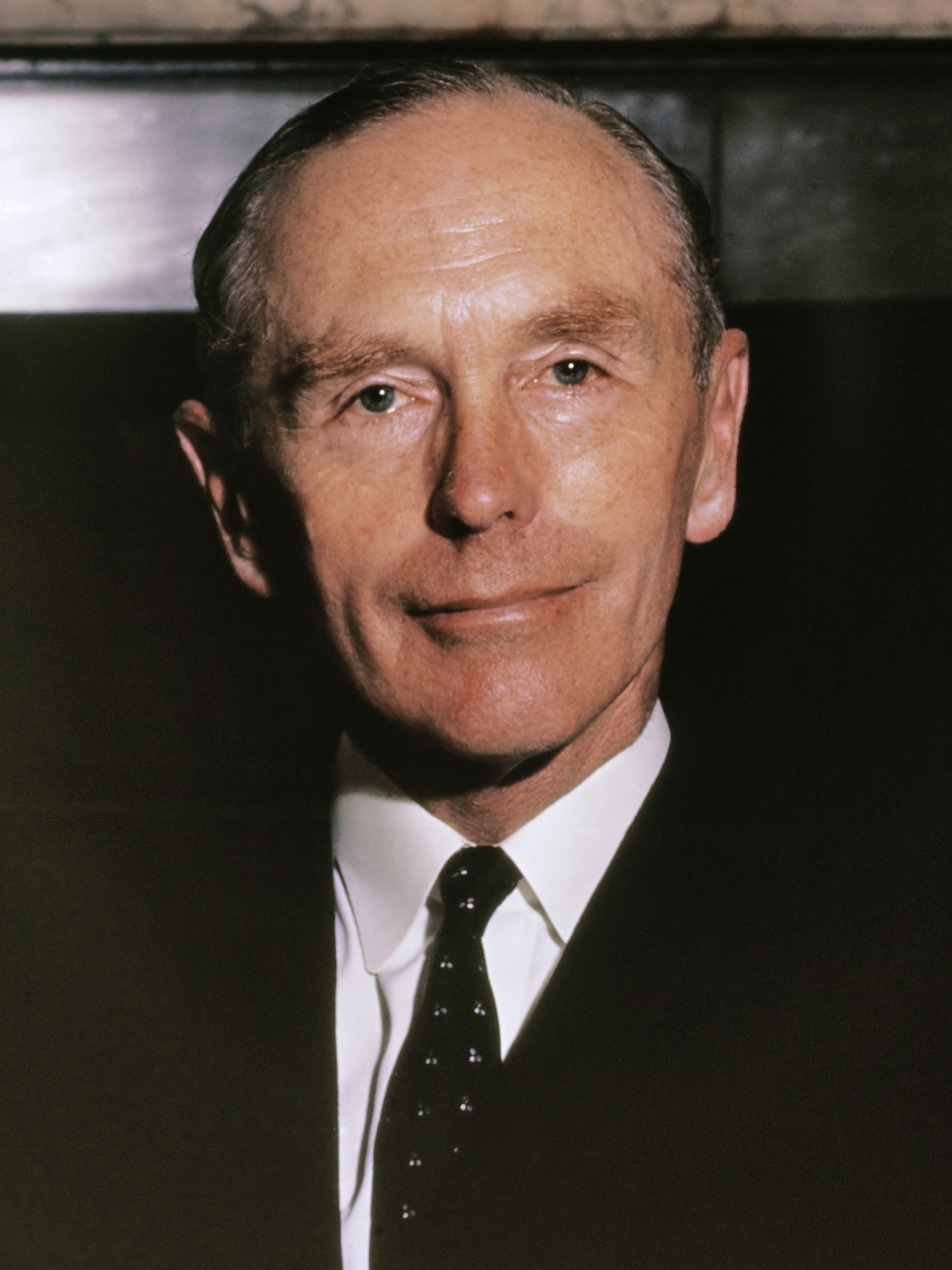
Sir Alec Douglas-Home met Vorster in March 1968, and told the MCC afterwards that South Africa would probably let D'Oliveira play.

In March 1968, having received no response from the SACA to Griffith's letter, the MCC asked Alec Douglas-Home to intervene. Douglas-Home, a former British Prime Minister and then the Opposition spokesman for foreign affairs, had just finished his term as MCC president and was visiting Rhodesia and South Africa; he agreed to raise the question of D'Oliveira during a meeting with Vorster that was part of his itinerary. Douglas-Home believed that the best way to deal with apartheid was through dialogue and that contact between the countries should be increased, not reduced—as he described it, "precept and example must be better than ostracism". When he met Vorster, Douglas-Home was reluctant to press him for an unequivocal answer, but discussed D'Oliveira. He also sounded out other figures in South Africa and returned to England to tell the MCC, in the words of the cricket writer E. W. Swanton, that "if D'Oliveira were to be chosen the odds were 5/4 on his being allowed in".

In the view of Fraser-Sampson: "While Douglas-Home's motives remain obscure, it is clear that he muddied the waters dreadfully. By allowing the MCC to believe they could continue happily fudging the issue, and by misleading them as to Vorster's true intentions, he delivered the worst of both worlds." Following Douglas-Home's advice, the MCC let the matter drift throughout the 1968 season. Conscious of D'Oliveira's poor form in the West Indies and continued lack of success during early 1968, the MCC committee kept in mind that it was far from certain that he would even make the team to tour South Africa.

Meanwhile, with the knowledge of Vorster and the South African government, the SACA carefully devised its answer to the MCC letter. The reply, which avoided directly answering the MCC question, was hand-delivered to the MCC secretary George "Gubby" Allen in March 1968 by the former South African Test captain Jack Cheetham, a close associate of several MCC officials. By this point, the MCC had accepted Douglas-Home's advice and no longer wanted a reply to their letter—Oborne records that when Cheetham "cheerily produced his laboriously produced document, a panic-stricken Gubby Allen waved it away." The letter was never presented to the full MCC Committee, and Cheetham returned to South Africa with news that a reply was not required—preparations for the tour could proceed as normal. This allowed Vorster to conceal his intentions regarding D'Oliveira for a further six months. Allen later justified his actions by suggesting that he was concerned that the SACA letter would be leaked to the press if it went any further. Oborne believes that Allen wished to hide from the full committee the MCC hierarchy's change of mind over the approach to take with the South Africans; he suggests that Allen and Griffith were effectively acting as a secret MCC subcommittee from this point.

=== South African plan ===
Vorster and the SACA followed D'Oliveira's form closely throughout the tour of West Indies and into the 1968 season. D'Oliveira's lack of success prompted press speculation that he might lose his England place for entirely non-political reasons, but Vorster was convinced that the MCC were committed to selecting him under any circumstances. He therefore conceived a two-pronged plan to prevent D'Oliveira's selection for the 1968–69 tour. He and the SACA would attempt to bribe D'Oliveira to make himself unavailable, while simultaneously persuading the English selectors—or more specifically the MCC, who Vorster believed would determine selection policy—not to choose him. The latter part of the plan depended on the MCC realising that picking D'Oliveira would mean no tour, but in making such attempts the South Africans risked public discovery, which would cause the tour to be cancelled anyway.

The bribery was planned from an early stage, but had to be postponed when D'Oliveira did not return to South Africa before the 1968 season. The second part of the plan was put into operation in March 1968. Vorster resolved to send a secret message to the MCC through Lord Cobham, a member and former president of the MCC with close links to D'Oliveira's county side Worcestershire. Cobham was visiting South Africa at Griffith's request to meet Arthur Coy, an official of the SACA. Cobham told Coy that he wanted the tour to go ahead, but agreed with him that D'Oliveira's inclusion would be "disastrous". Cobham seems to have promised Coy that he would attempt to dissuade D'Oliveira from touring, but never actually did so. Cobham then met Vorster, who told him that if D'Oliveira were chosen, the tour would be cancelled.

On his return to England, Cobham kept this information from the full MCC committee, knowing that they would be forced to cancel the tour if they became aware of it. Instead, he wrote a letter to a committee member, whose identity has never been made public. The letter's recipient passed it on to Griffith, who in turn showed it to Allen and Arthur Gilligan, at that time the MCC president. These three men chose to hide the information from the full committee, and nobody informed Denis Howell. Allen later defended these actions, setting out his reasoning in his biography, which was written by his close friend Swanton—Allen argued that the advice given by Douglas-Home, an international diplomat, took precedence over Cobham's information and had already been accepted by the MCC. He further suggested that, as the four England selectors had to choose the team "without any other consideration", and two of them sat on the MCC committee, it would have been unfair to burden them with Cobham's information. Oborne dismisses Allen's reasoning as "disastrously muddled", pointing out that Cobham's advice was far more up-to-date than Douglas-Home's, and that there would have been no burden of conscience for the team selectors as the new information would have caused the tour to be cancelled.

By the beginning of the 1968 season, the MCC's public position followed the advice of Douglas-Home: it was unknown whether or not South Africa would accept D'Oliveira and it would be better not to press the issue. Even so, three key members of the MCC were aware of the reality of the situation. Vorster had avoided international condemnation as he had not publicly declared D'Oliveira unacceptable, but his stand had been clearly conveyed to London in private.

=== D'Oliveira in 1968 ===
D'Oliveira was aware of the political discussions surrounding him during 1968, and the pressure on him was intensified by the scrutiny of his supporters and opponents in England and South Africa. Conscious of his failure in the West Indies, he made a concerted effort to improve his batting. He scored runs consistently and was chosen for England's first Test of 1968, against Australia in early June. He was very successful, scoring 87 not out and taking two wickets. After England lost, however, D'Oliveira was blamed in some sections of the press. Wisden Cricketers' Almanack noted that he failed as a bowler, and his innings was difficult to evaluate as England had effectively lost the match by that stage. Even so, most observers expected him to retain his place, including the watching South Africans.

Before the second Test, played at Lord's, a series of events took place that Fraser-Sampson later described as "so bizarre as to be totally unbelievable, and yet [they] happened". The evening before play began, Griffith suggested to D'Oliveira that, to save the 1968–69 series, he should withdraw himself from consideration for the tour, and announce that he wished in future to play for South Africa rather than England. D'Oliveira angrily declined. The next day, E. W. Swanton—a journalist technically unconnected with the MCC, but a close friend of Allen and a member of the "Establishment"—approached the player with a similar proposition, which D'Oliveira again dismissed. Both Griffith and Swanton were opposed to apartheid—Swanton had refused to report on the 1964–65 MCC tour of South Africa because of his objections to the system, and he supported D'Oliveira from a cricketing standpoint. This plan probably originated from one of the several South Africans present at Lord's with an interest in the D'Oliveira question, including Coy and the private cricket tour organiser Wilfred Isaacs; according to Fraser-Sampson, there is evidence to suggest that it first came from the SACA. Oborne writes that Griffith and Swanton were probably well-intentioned, and posits that they might have been caught up in a South African scheme in their search for a solution to the D'Oliveira problem. Fraser-Sampson suggests that they and other MCC figures may have felt forced into this course of action by the vigour of the South Africans' protests that they would not tolerate a team including D'Oliveira.

On the morning of the second Test, D'Oliveira was told by Colin Cowdrey, the England captain, that he had been left out of the team and was instead twelfth man. In his place, England chose a fast bowler to strengthen their bowling attack. While the game was taking place, Doug Insole, the chairman of the England selectors, introduced D'Oliveira to Isaacs, who offered him warm hospitality if he toured South Africa during the English winter. Deeply upset with his omission, D'Oliveira returned to play for Worcestershire once his twelfth man duties ended. Oborne suggests that, from a cricketing viewpoint, the decision to drop D'Oliveira looks odd, and that it may have been connected to the South African presence at Lord's. The replacement for D'Oliveira, Barry Knight, performed well in the second Test; D'Oliveira, by contrast, lost all batting form. From mid-June until August, bothered by the pressure over South Africa, he struggled to score, managing just 205 runs at an average of 12.81. He maintained his form as a bowler, but critics believed his chance had gone. In July, as part of a standard procedure, the MCC wrote to 30 leading players to ask if they were available to tour South Africa; D'Oliveira was not contacted. According to Fraser-Sampson, the idea that D'Oliveira was not then one of England's best 30 players was absurd; he writes that the selectors must therefore have been aware that Vorster would not accept his selection and they had consequently decided not to choose him.

During his slump in form, D'Oliveira was contacted by Tienie Oosthuizen, a director at the tobacco company Carreras, which was, alongside Rothmans, part of the South African Rembrandt Tobacco Corporation. Rembrandt had set up a group known as the South African Sports Foundation (SASF) to promote amateur sport. Oosthuizen told D'Oliveira that he represented Rothmans, who had sponsored matches featuring D'Oliveira while he was waiting to qualify for Worcestershire. He offered D'Oliveira work as a coach for the SASF on an annual salary of £4,000—a vast sum for a professional cricketer at the time—on the condition that he took up this role immediately at the end of the 1968 season, and thereby made himself unavailable for the MCC tour before selection took place. D'Oliveira tentatively declined, but Oosthuizen persisted, first offering to find out if he would be included in the MCC team, then telling him that his presence in that side would embarrass Vorster. D'Oliveira was aware that accepting the offer could cause many to lose respect for him as he would be abandoning the opportunity to play against South Africa, but nevertheless considered it over the following weeks. Oosthuizen repeatedly pressured him to accept. Shortly before the final Test of 1968, he offered personally to match the money that D'Oliveira claimed to have been offered to make himself available for the MCC team. D'Oliveira stalled, and involved his agent, Reg Hayter. After further conversations with Oosthuizen, D'Oliveira decided to try to postpone a decision until after the team to tour South Africa was announced—Hayter had established from a source close to the selectors that D'Oliveira had a good chance of being picked.

During a later press investigation, Oosthuizen claimed to have acted independently. Anton Rupert, the head of Rembrandt, endorsed this version, asserting that Oosthuizen had acted in his capacity as an employee of the SASF. Rupert said this was an autonomous organisation, but according to Oborne the SASF constitution made it totally dependent on Rembrandt. Oborne writes that Oosthuizen's offers were rooted in the plans made by Vorster and Coy to bribe D'Oliveira indirectly by offering him work that would prevent him from playing for the MCC. Oborne surmises that the position and salary offered to D'Oliveira did not come from the SASF, but were actually part of a scheme involving Vorster and Rupert to remove the controversial player from the tour. Williams also concludes that the offer was effectively a bribe to stop D'Oliveira playing.

In early August, D'Oliveira returned to form with an innings of 89 against Warwickshire. Before the fifth and final England–Australia Test match, played between 22 and 27 August, Cowdrey batted at the Oval, where the match was to be played, and deduced that medium-paced bowlers would be very effective given the condition of the cricket pitch. Consequently, when the England team was chosen, he asked for a medium-paced bowler to be placed in reserve in case conditions warranted their selection. The two first-choice selections, Knight and Tom Cartwright, were unavailable, so D'Oliveira was called up by Cowdrey as a reserve on account of his bowling. On the day before the game, one of the England batsmen, Roger Prideaux, withdrew from the team, saying he had an infection. (Note: Prideaux later admitted that he could have played, but was concerned that if he had failed in that game, it might have cost him his place on the winter tour of South Africa.) The team was duly re-arranged and the new version included D'Oliveira as a batsman. He heard no more from Oosthuizen, who was transferred from the London office soon after. The intervention of Oosthuizen became public knowledge when it was reported in the press in April 1969.

== Height of controversy ==
=== Oval Test match ===
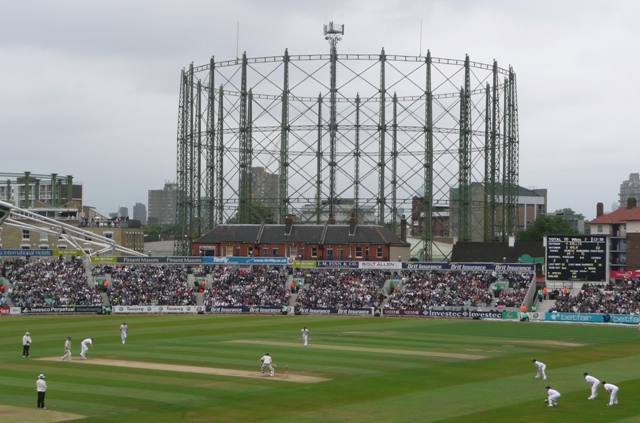
The Oval, pictured in 2008

Feeling much more confident, D'Oliveira expected to be successful in the Oval Test match. Before the game, an unnamed MCC official circulated a story that D'Oliveira had been offered thousands of pounds to keep himself available for the South Africa tour. This was a similar story to that which D'Oliveira had told Oosthuizen; it had probably travelled back to the MCC via South Africa, but was not true. When the game began, Australia held a 1–0 lead after four Tests; England needed a win to level the series. England made a reasonable start on the first day, but a late wicket brought D'Oliveira in to bat with the game delicately poised. Oborne observes that D'Oliveira was under huge pressure, both for simple cricketing reasons and because the world was watching to see if he would be successful. Wisden reported: "In the last hour D'Oliveira began his fine effort. He hooked the short ball superbly". At the end of the first day, he had scored 23 runs.

Early on the second day, D'Oliveira batted with less certainty. He was dropped by the opposition wicket-keeper with his score on 31, but he was encouraged by the umpire Charlie Elliott and his batting partner John Edrich. As his score reached fifty, Elliott whispered, "Well played—my God you're going to cause some problems." D'Oliveira went on to score 158 runs before he was out, although he was dropped a few more times after passing three figures. He received a prolonged ovation from the crowd when he was out, and congratulations from John Gleeson, one of the opposing Australians. Oborne assesses the innings as one of the best ever: despite the relatively weak attack and easy batting conditions, Oborne believes that no other cricketer had faced so much pressure and so many outside forces conspiring against him. Later in the game, D'Oliveira also contributed with the ball. After rain had reduced the amount of playing time and caused further delays through the subsequent clean-up, England faced a race against time to win the match. D'Oliveira took a crucial wicket with his 12th ball to break a long partnership and open the way for Derek Underwood to bowl England to victory in the game and a share in the series.

Off the field, manoeuvres started immediately. Vorster followed the innings closely, with Oosthuizen in attendance. On the second day of the match, Geoffrey Howard, the secretary of Surrey County Cricket Club (who played at the Oval), received a call from Oosthuizen, who informed Howard that he had been trying without success to contact Billy Griffith. He told Howard to pass along to Griffith the message that if "today's centurion is picked, the tour will be off". Meanwhile, Insole asked D'Oliveira if he was available to tour South Africa, and Cowdrey questioned him about how he would handle the inevitably tense situations. Cowdrey also said that he wanted him in the team. D'Oliveira was left in little doubt that he would be selected to tour South Africa.

=== Selection meeting ===
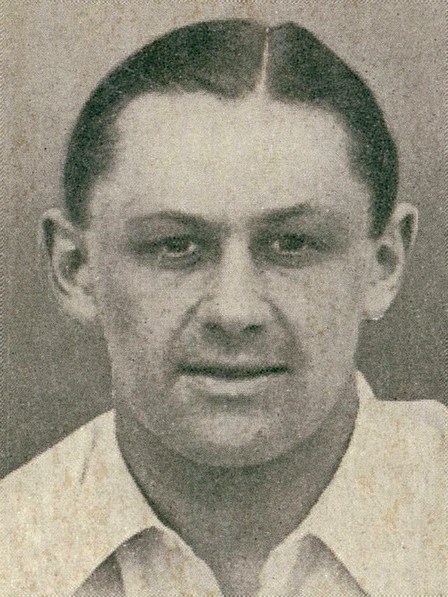
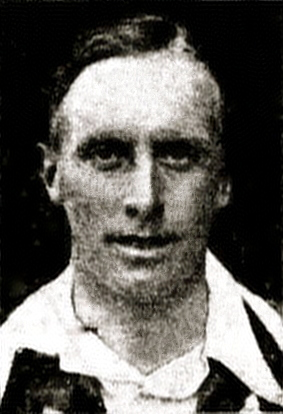
Gubby Allen (left) and Arthur Gilligan, two of the four or five MCC committee members at the selection meeting

The selectors, after a six-hour meeting, chose the team to tour South Africa on 27 August 1968. (Note: The meeting began at 8 pm on that date, but did not finish until 2 am on 28 August.) The official records of the meeting are incomplete and of those present, no one left an account of what happened. Oborne believes that at least ten men were present—the four selectors, Insole, Peter May, Don Kenyon and Alec Bedser; the England captain Colin Cowdrey; Gubby Allen, Billy Griffith, Arthur Gilligan and Donald Carr for the MCC; and possibly Maurice Allom, another MCC member. Oborne suggests that one of those present might have been acting for the South African government, as Vorster was well-informed about what happened at the meeting and followed events closely. He also observes that, of those present, Allen, Griffith and Gilligan knew from the Cobham letter what would happen if D'Oliveira were selected; he argues that they may have passed the information on to other selectors. Coy, who had been at the Lord's Test, may also have made the South African position clear at the meeting. According to Oborne, "Everyone in the room, with the possible exception of the Worcestershire skipper Don Kenyon, would have been aware that the selection of D'Oliveira could at best cause difficulties and at worst cause the tour to be cancelled." Fraser-Sampson goes further, suggesting that Insole, and possibly also May, knew the whole story from an early stage.

From a cricketing viewpoint, most critics agreed that D'Oliveira should probably have been selected based on his score at the Oval, his past record, and the usefulness of his bowling. The selectors left him out, however, deciding that his bowling was not strong enough to classify him as an all-rounder. Oborne points out that, judged in cricketing terms, this was "not an outrage". D'Oliveira had several rivals as a batsman, and of the places available, one went to Ken Barrington, who had a good Test record, and the other to Keith Fletcher, who was much younger than D'Oliveira. Oborne judges both of these decisions fair. Nobody at the selection meeting supported including D'Oliveira. Some of those present said later that, despite his prior assurances to D'Oliveira, Cowdrey opposed his selection at the meeting, which influenced others there. Fraser-Sampson suggests that Cowdrey, who later tried to justify his role in events, may have inwardly supported D'Oliveira's inclusion, but spoken against it out of a lack of confidence and decisiveness. It is also possible, argues Fraser-Sampson, that if May had been aware of the true state of affairs, he may have confided in Cowdrey, a close friend; this would have left Cowdrey, who was very keen to lead a team to South Africa, in a difficult and conflicted position. Fraser-Sampson concludes: "Far from being the villain of the piece, Cowdrey may simply have been an honourable man pushed beyond the limits of his character and overwhelmed by events."

As is customary at such selection meetings, there was no vote. Insole recalled that there was no hostility towards D'Oliveira at the meeting, and pointed out that although he was not chosen in the main team, he was made a reserve. Williams, while acknowledging that there were several worthy batsmen as candidates for places in the team, asserts that even if those at the meeting had only discussed the players' respective cricketing abilities, "every selector must have known that by not selecting D'Oliveira they would improve the prospects of the tour going ahead." The full MCC Committee met to formally approve the selected team on the afternoon of 28 August. Nobody voiced opposition.

D'Oliveira, who learned of his omission over the radio in the Worcestershire dressing room having just scored 128 runs against Sussex, was deeply upset and faced intense press attention. Insole and Griffith defended the decision to omit D'Oliveira to the press, saying that there had been no pressure from South Africa and that the chosen team simply included better players than D'Oliveira. Oborne writes that Insole considered the events surrounding the selection meeting as among the worst of his life, but that "he and the other selectors were victims of the decision, reached on the advice of Alec Douglas-Home early in 1968, not to press for an answer to the MCC demand there should be 'no preconditions' for the tour. Once that decision had been made, everything else followed: the bribery attempt, the secret pressure and the nobbling of the MCC. Had the matter been dealt with ... Insole would never have been subject to the innuendo and accusations of racism and betrayal that have haunted him ever since."

=== Reaction ===
While the general public were baffled that a man who just scored a century against Australia could be left out of the team, the English cricketing press were divided on the decision. Some journalists supported the MCC on cricketing grounds, including the cricket correspondents of The Times and The Daily Telegraph. (Note: John Woodcock, the Times correspondent, supported the selectors at the time, but later changed his mind, saying he had misjudged the situation surrounding D'Oliveira.) Others, prominently the former England captain Ted Dexter, the former Test player Trevor Bailey and E. W. Swanton, all of whom generally sided with the cricket establishment, contended that D'Oliveira deserved to be in the team on merit. Swanton said he had received no letters which actually agreed with the omission. Other commentators, such as the Worcestershire club secretary and the former West Indies Test player Learie Constantine, openly stated that D'Oliveira was omitted either because of his race or because the MCC supported apartheid. Some Labour politicians also expressed concern. John Arlott, while asserting that D'Oliveira deserved to be included, suggested that to demonstrate opposition to apartheid, the MCC should perhaps have selected him even if this were not the case. The general press took a wider view, with several newspaper columns reporting that the decision appeared to have been made to avoid offending the South African government. According to Williams, the public positions held by much of the MCC committee towards South Africa led to suspicions that D'Oliveira may have been left out simply to save the tour.

More recent commentators suggest that the MCC members were not directly motivated by support of apartheid. Oborne argues that the MCC establishment, without favouring apartheid, wished to maintain traditional links with white South Africa. Williams suggests that the committee were politically naïve, and that they ignored the political dimensions of D'Oliveira's non-selection. Williams writes that the committee seemed unaware that its decision made it appear to support apartheid. Fraser-Sampson believes that those involved "acted for what they thought were the best of motives, namely what they saw as the good of the game." Regarding the right-wing links of some individuals—Gilligan had been a member of the British Fascists during the 1920s, and Bedser later became a member of the Freedom Association, which Fraser-Sampson classifies as "far-right"—neither Oborne nor Fraser-Sampson suggests that the two men were racist, or that any of the selectors' actions regarding D'Oliveira were tainted by prejudice or support for apartheid. Fraser-Sampson does comment, however, that some individuals were "apologists" for Vorster, and that many of them firmly believed in the separation of politics and sport.

Not all MCC members supported the selectors. Around 70 members met, including the clergyman and former England captain David Sheppard, and called for the tour to be abandoned. Sheppard's intervention shook Cowdrey, a religious man. Within weeks, several MCC members had resigned in protest at the decision, and the MCC had received nearly 1,000 letters about it, mainly complaints. In South Africa, whites received the news happily—one nationalist rally broke into cheers upon hearing the news—while the black community viewed the omission as a betrayal. The British Anti-Apartheid Movement sent telegrams to the Prime Minister Harold Wilson, asking him to intervene, and to Gilligan, asking for the tour to be cancelled on the grounds that by playing in South Africa the England team would be "condoning apartheid". D'Oliveira received many letters of support from the public. He also received sympathetic letters from Cowdrey, Insole, Griffith and Cobham. He responded with a burst of good form, and was not drawn into publicly criticising the MCC, even offering the team his support. He signed a contract to cover the tour for the News of the World newspaper, which drew criticism from other newspapers and shook Vorster. At the time, non-whites were not allowed into South African press boxes other than "in a menial capacity"—Vorster suggested that D'Oliveira may not even be allowed on the tour as a journalist.

=== Cancellation ===
One of the MCC team, Tom Cartwright, had been struggling with an injury. He had considered withdrawing from the tour on moral grounds, owing to his reservations about involvement with the apartheid government. There are different versions of what actually happened. According to Cowdrey, Cartwright played without discomfort on 14 September, passed a fitness test the following day, and suddenly withdrew after an overnight reaction to his exertions, prompting the selectors to take only ten minutes to choose D'Oliveira as a replacement. Fraser-Sampson records that Cartwright actually had two fitness tests, owing to existing concerns over his health; the selectors tried to persuade him not to pull out, with Cowdrey particularly insistent, but Cartwright was adamant. On 16 September, he withdrew from the MCC team, citing his injury. D'Oliveira was duly called up, a decision announced the following day. Despite having been rejected as a bowler at the earlier meeting, he was now replacing a bowler in the team; the selectors stated that D'Oliveira's bowling might prove useful. Oborne's assessment of the decision is that "they had had enough and were bowing to public opinion." Williams comments that the belated addition of D'Oliveira in the wake of outcry at his exclusion confirmed in the minds of many that politics had been involved in the team selection. Denis Howell felt the need to state publicly that the decision was the MCC's alone, and that there had been no pressure from the government. D'Oliveira was pleased but suspected that the tour would no longer go ahead.

In South Africa, Vorster heard that D'Oliveira had been added to the team shortly before addressing the Orange Free State National Party congress at Bloemfontein on 17 September. He immediately announced that the English team would not be allowed into South Africa if it included D'Oliveira. He told the gathering that while "we are and always have been prepared to play host to the MCC ... [we] are not prepared to receive a team thrust upon us by people whose interests are not the game, but to gain certain political objectives which they do not even attempt to hide". To loud applause, he went on to describe the revised MCC team as "not the team of the MCC but the team of the Anti-Apartheid Movement, the team of SANROC [the South African Non-Racial Olympic Committee] and the team of Bishop Reeves [a critic of apartheid]." Vorster expressed similar sentiments elsewhere, accusing the MCC of making a purely political decision. He insisted that he "had taken a decision for South Africa". The South African press was mostly critical of Vorster, warning that his stand might lead to the country's exclusion from international sport but Professor Bruce Murray comments that the MCC's initial exclusion of D'Oliveira, only to then include him instead of a bowler, had given Vorster some ammunition to claim that the MCC selection was politically charged. Including D'Oliveira from the start would, by contrast, have forced Vorster to reveal that his plan to allow mixed teams was false.

In England, Griffith responded that the tour would be cancelled were D'Oliveira not allowed to play and that he was in the team on merit having missed selection first time around by "a bee's whisker". Cowdrey proposed flying to South Africa himself to safeguard the tour but the South African minister Ben Schoeman said that D'Oliveira had been chosen because of politics and that South Africa would make no deal to let him play. Coy and Cheetham flew secretly to London to try to find a compromise. They held a four-hour meeting with the MCC committee on 24 September, directly after which the committee announced that "the side selected to represent MCC in South Africa is not acceptable for reasons beyond the control of the SACA. The MCC committee therefore decided unanimously that the tour will not take place". Williams argues that the delay in cancelling the tour suggests that some in the MCC might still have hoped to find common ground with the South Africans. D'Oliveira briefly considered withdrawing from the team to save the series but decided not to.

Sheppard and other MCC rebels called a Special General Meeting of the MCC; they wanted the MCC to state publicly that the team selection had been mishandled and that no further cricket should take place with South Africa until cricket there had been made non-racial. Before the meeting took place, the General Committee met the rebels and initially claimed that it would have been inappropriate to ask South Africa about D'Oliveira before the tour—although they had done so. The committee then admitted writing a letter but said that they had never received a reply. The Special General Meeting took place in December 1968 but the rebels were outvoted by the other members; Sheppard was criticised by members at the meeting and his former friend Peter May refused to talk to him afterwards. Those opposing Sheppard suggested that he opposed apartheid whereas the committee wanted to advance cricket. It was also suggested that the MCC should not act as the conscience of Britain. Williams suggests that the vote indicated that a high proportion of the MCC favoured maintaining cricketing links with South Africa despite knowing that South African cricket operated racial segregation.

== Aftermath ==
Coming just after New Zealand abandoned their 1967 rugby tour over South Africa's refusal to accommodate a mixed team, the cancellation of the 1968–69 MCC series over D'Oliveira marked the second such incident in two years. According to Oborne, the affair forced upon South African cricket a realisation that it had to change. In 1969, the South African Cricket Board of Control (SACBOC) announced that teams would be racially integrated and selected purely on merit; efforts duly began to allow all people to compete against each other and share facilities. This led to some disagreement among non-white sports organisations between those who supported these incremental changes and those who wanted immediate disbanding of the old system. D'Oliveira, a member of the first group, was partly drawn into this conflict. He also faced criticism from those in South Africa and England who believed that, to oppose apartheid, he should have declared himself unavailable to tour in the first place. With the tour to South Africa cancelled, the MCC hastily arranged for its team to play a Test series in Pakistan instead. D'Oliveira played and was very successful. He remained an England regular for four more years and played for Worcestershire until 1979.

In 1969, many of the events from the previous year became public knowledge, including the deceptions of Allen, Griffith and Gilligan. The MCC committee met and granted retrospective approval to the actions of the four men. Griffith's offer to resign was declined. The press outcry of 1968 was not repeated; Fraser-Sampson speculates that the MCC applied pressure to journalists. Griffith and Allen later received honours from the British government.

Controversy continued in Britain and other countries regarding sporting links with South Africa. The South Africa rugby team's 1969–70 tour of Britain and Ireland was accompanied by mass demonstrations against apartheid, including an attempt by a protester in London to hijack the South African team bus, and a demonstration in Dublin where people tried to stop the South Africans from reaching the match venue by lying down in the middle of the street. The South Africa cricket team was due to tour England shortly afterwards and the MCC remained keen for the series to go ahead. They cancelled the tour a week before the South Africans were due to arrive, following public protests and pressure from the UK government. Anti-apartheid demonstrations in Australia during the South Africa rugby team's 1971 tour led to soaring police costs, matches played behind fences and barbed wire, and a state of emergency in Queensland, all of which prompted the Australian Cricket Board to cancel the tour by the South Africa cricket team that had been scheduled to follow. (Note: Both of these cancelled tours were replaced by pseudo-Test series pitting the host nation against "Rest of the World" teams featuring leading cricketers from around the world, including several South Africans.)

South Africa was thereafter almost totally isolated from international cricket, but not from rugby. The Australian Rugby Union severed ties with South Africa after the turbulent 1971 series but its counterparts in New Zealand, France and the Home Nations retained links into the 1980s. With Māori and Samoan players officially designated "honorary whites" by the South African government, mixed-race New Zealand rugby teams toured South Africa in 1970 and 1976. The SACBOC formally integrated South African cricket in 1976 but overseas opposition to South Africa's internal governance meant that the country did not play official international cricket again until 1991, after the start of the process to dismantle apartheid.

== Bibliography ==
- Fraser-Sampson, Guy (2011). Cricket at the Crossroads : Class, Colour and Controversy from 1967 to 1977. London: Elliot and Thompson. ISBN 978-1-907642-34-0.
- Oborne, Peter (2004). Basil D'Oliveira. Cricket and Conspiracy: The Untold Story. London: Little, Brown. ISBN 0-316-72572-2.
- Quelch, Tim (2012). Bent Arms & Dodgy Wickets: England's Troubled Reign as Test Match Kings during the Fifties. Durrington: Pitch Publishing. ISBN 978-1-909178-39-7.
- Swanton, E. W. (1985). Gubby Allen: Man of Cricket. London: Hutchinson/Stanley Paul. ISBN 0-09-159780-3.
- Williams, Jack (2001). Cricket and Race. Oxford: Berg. ISBN 1-85973-309-3.

== Films ==
- Not Cricket - The Basil D'Oliveira Conspiracy Directed by Paul Yule, Berwick Universal Pictures, 2004
