= South African Fezela XI =

South African cricket team

The South African Fezela XI (often known simply as the Fezelas) was a team of young South African cricketers who toured England in 1961 under the captaincy of the Test player Roy McLean. Several of the team later went on to play leading parts in the revival of South Africa’s cricket fortunes in the 1960s.

== Background ==
South Africa's tour of England in 1960 had been a failure. "From nearly every point of view the ninth South African tour of England proved disappointing," Wisden began its report. First, it was a wet summer, and many matches were disrupted by rain. Second, the young fast bowler Geoff Griffin was no-balled for throwing on several occasions, effectively ending his career. Third, anti-apartheid demonstrations were held outside most venues. Fourth, none of the young players showed signs of developing into good Test players. Fifth, South Africa lost the first three Tests and drew the other two. Sixth, the tour showed a financial loss. Seventh, apart from Roy McLean the South Africans "found themselves short of enterprising batsmen".

The effect in South Africa was immediate. "Interest in South African domestic cricket waned alarmingly during the 1960-61 season," reported Wisden. "It became increasingly obvious as the season progressed that the disappointment at the Springboks' Test performances in England added to lack of enterprise and an 'avoid-defeat-at-all-costs' attitude had left a deep-seated scar which only a complete volte face would heal."

A cricket lover, E. Stanley Murphy, stepped in with an offer to sponsor a team of young players on a tour of England. Murphy had made his fortune as a leading figure in the sugar industry at Umfolozi in Zululand. He provided all the money for the tour and asked McLean to select the side. Murphy named the team fezela, the Zulu word for the water scorpion, an aquatic insect that can deliver a wasp-like sting.

== The tour ==
A tour of 21 matches in England, Scotland and Ireland was arranged, and McLean selected the following team (with their ages at the start of the tour):

- Roy McLean (Natal) 30, right-hand batsman (captain)
- Kim Elgie (Natal) 28, right-hand batsman, slow left-arm orthodox bowler (vice-captain)
- Eddie Barlow (Transvaal) 20, right-hand batsman, right-arm medium-pace bowler
- Colin Bland (Rhodesia) 23, right-hand batsman
- Jackie Botten (North-Eastern Transvaal) 22, right-arm fast bowler
- Graham Bunyard (Transvaal) 21, right-arm fast bowler
- Christopher Burger (Natal) 25, right-hand batsman
- Ian Fullerton (Transvaal) 25, right-hand opening batsman
- Ray Gripper (Rhodesia) 22, right-hand opening batsman
- Denis Lindsay (North-Eastern Transvaal) 21, right-hand batsman, wicketkeeper
- Lynton Morby-Smith (Natal) 25, right-hand batsman
- Peter Pollock (Eastern Province) 19, right-arm fast bowler
- Colin Rushmere (Western Province) 24, right-hand batsman, right-arm medium-pace bowler
- Peter van der Merwe (Western Province) 24, right-hand batsman, slow left-arm orthodox bowler

(David Pithey was originally selected, but had to withdraw just before the tour began, and was replaced by Barlow.)

The team was managed by C.O. Medworth, who at the time was sports editor of the Natal Mercury.

Of the 21 matches played in June and July 1961, the team won 12 and drew the rest. It won all three first-class matches (against Essex, Combined Services and Gloucestershire) easily.

"The fellows really learned to hit the ball. I gave them free rein ... There was none of this push and prod," McLean said. Wisden's brief report noted that "The batting was aggressive, bowling keen and fielding splendid", and that nearly two-thirds of the runs were scored in fours and sixes.

== Influence of the tour ==
Barlow, Pollock, Bland and Elgie played their first Test matches in the series against New Zealand a few months later in 1961-62; Lindsay and van der Merwe against Australia in 1963-64; Botten against England in 1965.

When van der Merwe captained South Africa to victory in England in 1965 (South Africa’s first series victory since 1953-54, and first in England since 1935), Wisden praised the South Africans' new-found "willingness to hit the ball" and their "enterprising methods". It continued: "Much of the credit for the transformation must go to that exuberant character R. A. McLean, who ... moulded the new Springboks when he brought the Fezela side to England in 1961."

Of the 30 Tests South Africa played between the Fezela tour and isolation after the 1969-70 series against Australia, Barlow played all 30, Pollock 28, Bland 21, Lindsay 19 and van der Merwe 15 (eight as captain). Only Trevor Goddard, who was too experienced to be considered for the Fezela tour, and Graeme Pollock, who was too young, played as many Tests in that period.
