= International cricket in 1952–53 =

International cricket season

The 1952–53 international cricket season was from September 1952 to April 1953.

== Season overview ==
International tours
Start date	Home team	Away team	Results [Matches]			
Start date	Home team	Away team	Test	ODI	FC	LA
16 October 1952	India	Pakistan	2–1 [5]	—	—	—
5 December 1952	Australia	South Africa	2–2 [5]	—	—	—
21 January 1953	West Indies	India	1–0 [5]	—	—	—
7 February 1953	India	Ceylon	—	—	0–1 [1]	—
6 March 1953	New Zealand	South Africa	0–1 [2]	—	—	—

== October ==
=== Pakistan in India ===
Test series
No.	Date	Home captain	Away captain	Venue	Result
Test 355	16–18 October	Lala Amarnath	Abdul Kardar	Feroz Shah Kotla Ground, Delhi	India by an innings and 70 runs
Test 356	23–26 October	Lala Amarnath	Abdul Kardar	University Ground, Lucknow	Pakistan by an innings and 43 runs
Test 357	13–16 November	Lala Amarnath	Abdul Kardar	Brabourne Stadium, Bombay	India by 10 wickets
Test 358	28–1 December	Lala Amarnath	Abdul Kardar	Madras Cricket Club Ground, Madras	Match drawn
Test 360	12–15 December	Lala Amarnath	Abdul Kardar	Eden Gardens, Calcutta	Match drawn

== December ==
=== South Africa in Australia ===
Test series
No.	Date	Home captain	Away captain	Venue	Result
Test 359	5–10 December	Lindsay Hassett	Jack Cheetham	The Gabba, Brisbane	Australia by 96 runs
Test 361	24–30 December	Lindsay Hassett	Jack Cheetham	Melbourne Cricket Ground, Melbourne	South Africa by 82 runs
Test 362	9–13 January	Lindsay Hassett	Jack Cheetham	Sydney Cricket Ground, Sydney	Australia by an innings and 38 runs
Test 364	24–29 January	Lindsay Hassett	Jack Cheetham	Adelaide Oval, Adelaide	Match drawn
Test 365	6–12 February	Lindsay Hassett	Jack Cheetham	Melbourne Cricket Ground, Melbourne	South Africa by 6 wickets

== January ==
=== India in the West Indies ===
Test Series
No.	Date	Home captain	Away captain	Venue	Result
Test 363	21–28 January	Jeffrey Stollmeyer	Vijay Hazare	Queen's Park Oval, Port of Spain	Match drawn
Test 366	7–12 February	Jeffrey Stollmeyer	Vijay Hazare	Kensington Oval, Bridgetown	West Indies by 142 runs
Test 367	19–25 February	Jeffrey Stollmeyer	Vijay Hazare	Queen's Park Oval, Port of Spain	Match drawn
Test 369	11–17 March	Jeffrey Stollmeyer	Vijay Hazare	Bourda, Georgetown	Match drawn
Test 371	28 Mar–4 April	Jeffrey Stollmeyer	Vijay Hazare	Sabina Park, Kingston	Match drawn

== February ==
=== Ceylon in India ===
MJ Gopalan Trophy
No.	Date	Home captain	Away captain	Venue	Result
FC Match	7–9 February	Not mentioned	Not mentioned	Corporation Stadium, Madras	Ceylon by 95 runs

== March ==
=== South Africa in New Zealand ===
Test series
No.	Date	Home captain	Away captain	Venue	Result
Test 368	6–10 March	Geoff Rabone	Jack Cheetham	Basin Reserve, Wellington	South Africa by an innings and 180 runs
Test 370	13–17 March	Geoff Rabone	Jack Cheetham	Eden Park, Auckland	Match drawn
