= Ramon Thomas =

Australian cricketer and baseball player

Ray Thomas
Personal information
- Full name: Ramon Cedric Thomas
- Born: 18 November 1932; Mile End, Adelaide, South Australia
- Died: 18 January 2017 (aged 84)
- Batting: Right-handed
- Bowling: Right-arm fast-medium

Domestic team information
- Years: Team
- 1952-53: South Australia

Career statistics
Competition	First-class
Matches	6
Runs scored	64
Batting average	9.14
100s/50s	0/0
Top score	31
Balls bowled	1392
Wickets	9
Bowling average	60.77
5 wickets in innings	0
10 wickets in match	0
Best bowling	2/71
Catches/stumpings	1/–
- Source: Cricinfo, 19 January 2020

Ramon Cedric "Ray" Thomas (18 November 1932 – 18 January 2017) was a cricketer and baseballer who represented South Australia in both sports in the 1950s.

Ray Thomas attended Adelaide High School. A right-arm fast-medium bowler, he played most of the 1952–53 season for South Australia, but despite claiming the South African captain Jack Cheetham as his first wicket he was unable to make the most of his opportunities and did not play again after that season. At baseball, he represented South Australia as a pitcher.
