= Atholl McKinnon =

South African cricketer (1932–1983)

- Atholl McKinnon in 1965

Personal information
- Full name: Atholl Henry McKinnon
- Born: 20 August 1932; Port Elizabeth, Cape Province
- Died: 2 December 1983 (aged 51); Durban, Natal
- Batting: Right-handed
- Bowling: Slow left-arm orthodox

International information
- National side: South Africa

Career statistics
Competition	Tests	First-class
Matches	8	111
Runs scored	107	1687
Batting average	17.83	14.92
100s/50s	0/0	0/4
Top score	27	62
Balls bowled	2546	25805
Wickets	26	470
Bowling average	35.57	21.14
5 wickets in innings	0	38
10 wickets in match	0	9
Best bowling	4/128	7/37
Catches/stumpings	1/-	32/-
- Source: Cricinfo

Atholl Henry McKinnon (20 August 1932 – 2 December 1983) was a South African cricketer who played in eight Tests from 1960 to 1966.

McKinnon was born in Port Elizabeth, Cape Province, and attended Grey High School, a school famous for its sporting achievements.

A left-arm spinner and right-handed batsman, he toured England with the South African teams in 1960 and 1965, the only player to go on both tours. He represented Eastern Province in the Currie Cup from 1952–53 to 1962–63, and Transvaal from 1963–64 to 1968–69.

He later became a coach. He died of a heart attack in 1983 in Durban, Natal, while managing the unofficial West Indian team in South Africa.
