= Ray Gripper =

Rhodesian cricketer (1938–2026)

Personal information
- Full name: Raymond Arthur Gripper
- Born: 7 July 1938; Salisbury, Southern Rhodesia
- Died: 28 October 2026 (aged 88)
- Batting: Right-handed
- Bowling: Right-arm medium
- Role: Batsman

Domestic team information
- Years: Team
- 1957/58–1971/72: Rhodesia
- FC debut: 26 December 1957 Rhodesia v Eastern Province
- Last FC: 19 February 1972 Rhodesia v Western Province

Career statistics
Competition	First-class	List A
Matches	83	3
Runs scored	4,353	99
Batting average	30.44	33
100s/50s	7/17	0/1
Top score	279*	50
Balls bowled	222	–
Wickets	3	–
Bowling average	40	–
5 wickets in innings	0	–
10 wickets in match	0	–
Best bowling	1/9	–
Catches/stumpings	58/–	0/–
- Source: CricketArchive, 14 January 2010

Raymond Arthur Gripper (7 July 1938 – 28 October 2026) was a Rhodesian cricketer. A right-handed opening batsman, he was a regular member of the Rhodesian side for 15 years starting in 1957–58, at one stage captaining them. His highest score was an innings of 279 not out made against Orange Free State in 1967–68. This remained a Currie Cup record for some years. His son Trevor played Test cricket for Zimbabwe, also as an opening batsman.

== Background ==
Gripper was born on 7 July 1938, in Salisbury, Southern Rhodesia. He worked as a farmer, before turning his attention towards cricket. He has one son, Trevor Gripper, who played Test and ODI cricket for Zimbabwe.

== Cricket career ==
Gripper made his debut for the Rhodesian cricket team in the 1957–58 season, playing 83 first class games in the Currie Cup for the territory between 1957–58 and 1971–72. He had an unbroken run playing for the team for eight years between 1958 and 1966, when he was dropped for a game against Transvaal. He later managed to get back into the team, and he scored his highest score of 279 not out against Orange Free State in the 1967–68 season. This score was a Currie Cup record for many years. Gripper also occasionally bowled some right-arm medium pace, taking 3 wickets at an average of forty runs apiece in his first class career. He toured England with the South African Fezela XI in 1961.

== Administrator ==
Following his retirement as a cricketer in the 1971–72 season citing "business pressures", Gripper became involved in the administrative side of Rhodesian, and later Zimbabwean cricket. Gripper continued to be a leading administrator within the game until the situation within Zimbabwe Cricket began to deteriorate during the Zimbabwean cricket crisis, whereupon he resigned from the board. Gripper then became a prominent critic of the direction in which cricket was heading in Zimbabwe, notably accusing Zimbabwe Cricket chairman Peter Chingoka of corruption over payments he received "for service to cricket for 21 years", as well as criticising the structure of Zimbabwe Cricket which had stripped the players and provincial associations of voting power, thus making it impossible to remove Chingoka. He also described the managing board of Zimbabwe Cricket as a group of "money-grabbers only in the game for what they can get out of it".

Gripper was accused by some of being involved in the players' strike that crippled Zimbabwe's national team during the Zimbabwe Cricket Crisis. Gripper was approached by ZCU chairman Ozias Bvute in an attempt to negotiate a compromise deal with the rebel players.

== Death ==
Gripper died on 28 October 2026, at the age of 88.
