= Colin Wesley =

South African cricketer (1937–2022)

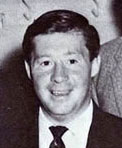
- Wesley in 1960

Personal information
- Born: 5 September 1937; Durban, Natal, Union of South Africa
- Died: 5 March 2022 (aged 84); Johannesburg, South Africa
- Nickname: Tich
- Height: 5 ft 4.5 in (1.64 m)
- Batting: Left-handed
- Bowling: Slow left-arm orthodox

International information
- National side: South Africa
- Test debut: 23 June 1960 v England
- Last Test: 21 July 1960 v England

Domestic team information
- Years: Team
- 1956/57–1957/58: South African Universities
- 1957/58–1965/66: Natal

Career statistics
Competition	Test	FC	LA
Matches	3	51	3
Runs scored	49	1,892	8
Batting average	9.80	27.02	2.66
100s/50s	0/0	3/8	0/0
Top score	35	131	7
Balls bowled	0	918	12
Wickets	–	15	0
Bowling average	–	23.60	–
5 wickets in innings	–	0	–
10 wickets in match	–	0	–
Best bowling	–	4/51	–
Catches/stumpings	1/–	20/–	3/–
- Source: Cricinfo, 30 April 2022

Colin "Tich" Wesley (5 September 1937 – 5 March 2022) was a South African cricketer who played in three Test matches in 1960.

Wesley played first-class cricket for Natal from 1957 to 1966 as a middle-order batsman and left-arm spin bowler. He toured England with the South African team in 1960. His highest first-class score was 131, made after Natal followed on against the New Zealanders in 1961–62. His only century in the Currie Cup came in his last first-class season, when he captained Natal B against North Eastern Transvaal and made 120 in the first innings, the only century in the match.

He briefly returned to provincial cricket to captain the Natal team, which played under the name "C. Wesley's XI", in the first season of South Africa's domestic List A competition in 1969–70; they lost the final by two runs.

He owned Wesley's, a chain of tobacco stores in South Africa. He died at home in Johannesburg on 5 March 2022, at the age of 84.
