= Roy McLean =

South African cricketer

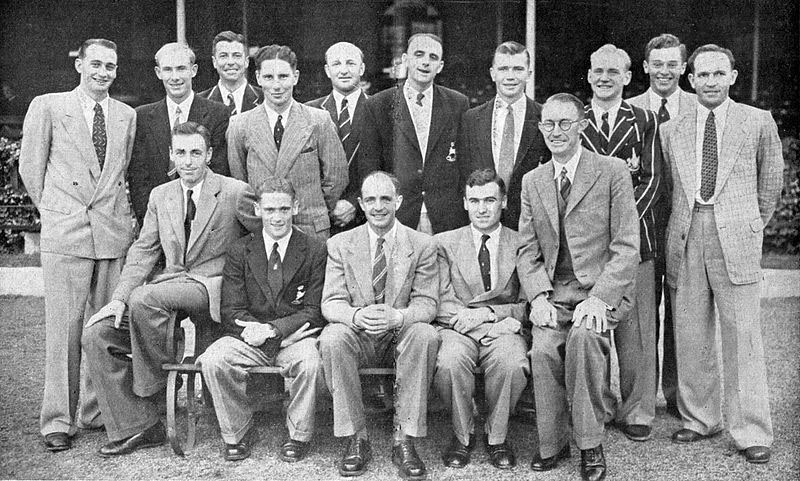
- The South African touring team in 1952-53. McLean is standing, fourth from the left.

Personal information
- Full name: Roy Alastair McLean
- Born: 9 July 1930; Pietermaritzburg, Natal, South Africa
- Died: 26 August 2007 (aged 77); Johannesburg, South Africa
- Batting: Right-handed

International information
- National side: South Africa
- Test debut: 5 July 1951 v England
- Last Test: 23 December 1964 v England

Domestic team information
- Years: Team
- 1949/50–1965/66: Natal

Career statistics
Competition	Test	First-class
Matches	40	200
Runs scored	2,120	10,969
Batting average	30.28	36.68
100s/50s	5/10	22/65
Top score	142	207
Balls bowled	4	184
Wickets	0	2
Bowling average	–	61.00
5 wickets in innings	–	0
10 wickets in match	–	0
Best bowling	–	2/22
Catches/stumpings	23/–	132/–
- Source: Cricinfo, 3 December 2020

Roy Alastair McLean (9 July 1930 – 26 August 2007) was a South African cricketer who played in 40 Test matches between 1951 and 1964. A stroke-playing middle-order batsman, he scored over 2,000 Test runs, but made 11 ducks in 73 Test innings.

McLean was born in Pietermaritzburg, Natal, and educated at Hilton College. He excelled at cricket, hockey and rugby union, and was a strong enough rugby player to represent Natal at fly-half.

As a cricketer, he made his first-class debut for Natal in 1949, and his Test debut on the 1951 tour of England at Old Trafford. He established himself as an exciting and forceful middle-order batsman in the South African team. He was particularly successful on tour, hitting an unbeaten 76 to win the final Test of the 1952–53 tour to Australia, to square the series, despite Australia scoring 520 in their first Innings. He played against the touring Australian rugby union team later in 1953, scoring a drop-goal as fly-half for Natal to win 15–14.

He made his highest Test score in the 2nd Test at Lord's on the tour to England in 1955. Batting against a bowling attack that included Brian Statham, Fred Trueman, Trevor Bailey and Johnny Wardle, he rode his luck, hitting 21 fours and a six but being dropped several times, and scoring 142 of 196 the runs while he was at the wicket, before he was finally bowled by Statham. Nevertheless, England won by 76 runs. In the 3rd Test, at Old Trafford, he hooked Frank Tyson for four several times in the second innings, hitting 50 in 71 minutes before he was run out: South Africa won with 9 balls to spare. He was the South African Cricket Annual Cricketer of the Year in 1955. He and fast bowler Neil Adcock were the only successes of the 1960 tour of England. He reached his highest first-class score, 207, against Worcestershire, and recorded the fastest century that season, in 75 minutes against A E R Gilligan's XI in a festival match at Hastings, despite only scoring 6 runs in the first half an hour. Each was named as a Wisden Cricketer of the Year in 1961.

In 1961 he led an unofficial tour to England by a team of young players named the Fezelas. The team contained the nucleus of the great South African side of the late 1960s, with such players as Peter Pollock, Eddie Barlow, Colin Bland, Denis Lindsay and Peter van der Merwe, and was unbeaten on the tour. In the 1966 Wisden Cricketers' Almanack the editor Norman Preston, reflecting on the success of the touring South Africans in 1965, paid tribute to "that exuberant character R.A. McLean ... who moulded the new Springboks when he brought the Fezela side to England in 1961".

He played all five Tests when New Zealand toured in 1961–62, a final two Tests against England in South Africa in 1964–65, and retired from first-class cricket in 1966. He became an insurance salesman.

McLean died in Johannesburg following a long illness. He was survived by his wife of 51 years, Barbara, and their three daughters.

== Bibliography of works ==
- Sackcloth Without Ashes (1958), Hodder & Stoughton.
