= Lynton Morby-Smith =

South African cricketer

Personal information
- Full name: Lynton Morby-Smith
- Born: 27 May 1936 (age 90); Durban, Natal, South Africa
- Batting: Right-handed
- Bowling: Right-arm off-spin

Domestic team information
- Years: Team
- 1958-59 to 1960-61: Natal
- 1963-64 to 1966-67: Western Province

Career statistics
Competition	First-class
Matches	35
Runs scored	1743
Batting average	34.17
100s/50s	2/11
Top score	127
Balls bowled	50
Wickets	2
Bowling average	16.50
5 wickets in innings	0
10 wickets in match	0
Best bowling	1/30
Catches/stumpings	19/0
- Source: Cricket Archive, 13 August 2014

Lynton Morby-Smith (born 27 May 1936, Durban, Natal, South Africa) is a former cricketer who played first-class cricket from 1958 to 1967.

Morby-Smith made his first-class debut for Natal in 1958–59, playing five matches and scoring 223 runs at an average of 37.16. He continued to play for Natal in 1959-60 and 1960–61, with more moderate results. He toured England in 1961 with the South African Fezela XI of promising young players.

After a two-year gap he resumed his career in 1963–64 with Western Province. In four matches in the Currie Cup he scored 451 runs at 56.37 batting at number three. In the first three matches he made 99 and 41 against Eastern Province, 60 and 101 (his first century) against Transvaal, and 77 and 31 against Natal. He was one of the South African Cricket Annual Cricketers of the Year.

Morby-Smith made his highest score, 127, in a friendly match against Eastern Province in 1964–65. After captaining Western Province in 1966–67 he retired from first-class cricket.
