= Arthur Coy =

South African cricketer

Personal information
- Born: 17 December 1902; Brenzett, England
- Died: 15 May 1983 (aged 80); Port Elizabeth, South Africa
- Source: Cricinfo, 17 December 2020

Arthur Coy (17 December 1902 – 15 May 1983) was a South African cricketer. He played in twenty-four first-class matches for Eastern Province from 1934/35 to 1947/48. Coy was also a member of the South African Cricket Association during the D'Oliveira affair.

== See also ==
- List of Eastern Province representative cricketers
