= South African cricket team in England in 1960 =

International cricket tour

The South African cricket team toured England in the 1960 season to play a five-match Test series against England. England won the series 3–0 with 2 matches drawn.

== The team ==
- Jackie McGlew (captain)
- Neil Adcock
- Peter Carlstein
- Chris Duckworth
- Jonathan Fellows-Smith
- Trevor Goddard
- Geoff Griffin
- Atholl McKinnon
- Roy McLean
- Sid O'Linn
- Tony Pithey
- Jim Pothecary
- Hugh Tayfield
- John Waite
- Colin Wesley

Dudley Nourse was the manager.

== The tour ==
"From nearly every point of view the ninth South African tour of England proved disappointing," Wisden's editor, Norman Preston, began his report. First, it was a wet summer, and many matches were disrupted by rain. Second, the young fast bowler Geoff Griffin was no-balled for throwing on several occasions, effectively ending his career. Third, anti-apartheid demonstrations were held outside most venues. Fourth, none of the young players showed signs of developing into good Test players. Fifth, South Africa lost the first three Tests and drew the other two. Sixth, the tour showed a financial loss. Seventh, apart from Roy McLean the South Africans "found themselves short of enterprising batsmen".

== Test series summary ==
=== First Test ===
9–14 June 1960
Scorecard

England	v	South Africa
292 (150.5 overs); R Subba Row 56; NAT Adcock 5/62 (41.5 overs)		186 (82.5 overs); JHB Waite 58; FS Trueman 4/58 (24.5 overs)
203 (86 overs); PM Walker 37; HJ Tayfield 4/62 (27 overs)		209 (84 overs); RA McLean 68; JB Statham 3/41 (18 overs)

England won by 100 runs
Edgbaston, Birmingham
Umpires: JG Langridge and WE Phillipson

- England won the toss and elected to bat.
- 12 June was taken as a rest day.
- RW Barber and PM Walker (both ENG), and S O'Linn, JP Fellows-Smith and GM Griffin (all SA) made their Test debuts.

=== Second Test ===
23–27 June 1960
Scorecard

England	v	South Africa
362/8d (129 overs); MJK Smith 99; GM Griffin 4/87 (30 overs)		152 (43.3 overs); JP Fellows-Smith 29; JB Statham 6/63 (20 overs)
		137 (f/o) (57 overs); C Wesley 35; JB Statham 5/34 (21 overs)

England won by an innings and 73 runs
Lord's, London
Umpires: JS Buller and FS Lee

- England won the toss and elected to bat.
- 26 June was taken as a rest day.
- The match was scheduled for five days but completed in four.
- C Wesley (SA) made his Test debut.

=== Third Test ===
7–11 July 1960
Scorecard

England	v	South Africa
287 (125.3 overs); KF Barrington 80; TL Goddard 5/80 (42 overs)		88 (38.3 overs); JP Fellows-Smith 31*; FS Trueman 5/27 (14.3 overs)
49/2 (14.4 overs); MC Cowdrey 27; TL Goddard 2/13 (5 overs)		247 (f/o) (94.4 overs); S O'Linn 98; FS Trueman 4/77 (22 overs)

England won by 8 wickets
Trent Bridge, Nottingham
Umpires: CS Elliott and FS Lee

- England won the toss and elected to bat.
- 10 July was taken as a rest day.
- The match was scheduled for five days but completed in four.
- JE Pothecary (SA) made his Test debut.

=== Fourth Test ===
21–26 July 1960
Scorecard

England	v	South Africa
260 (93 overs); KF Barrington 76; NAT Adcock 4/66 (23 overs)		229 (89.5 overs); RA McLean 109; DA Allen 4/58 (19.5 overs)
153/7d (75 overs); KF Barrington 35; NAT Adcock 3/59 (27 overs)		46/0 (26 overs); DJ McGlew 26*

Match drawn
Old Trafford, Manchester
Umpires: JG Langridge and N Oldfield

- England won the toss and elected to bat.
- 24 July was taken as a rest day.
- There was no play on the first or second days.
- DEV Padgett (ENG) made his Test debut.

=== Fifth Test ===
18–23 August 1960
Scorecard

England	v	South Africa
155 (76.3 overs); G Pullar 59; NAT Adcock 6/65 (31.3 overs)		419 (171.1 overs); TL Goddard 99; ER Dexter 3/79 (30 overs)
479/9d (157 overs); G Pullar 175; TL Goddard 3/69 (27 overs)		97/4 (29.2 overs); RA McLean 32*; FS Trueman 2/34 (10 overs)

Match drawn
The Oval, London
Umpires: CS Elliott and WE Phillipson

- England won the toss and elected to bat.
- 21 August was taken as a rest day
- AH McKinnon (SA) made his Test debut.

== Annual reviews ==
- Playfair Cricket Annual 1961
- Wisden Cricketers' Almanack 1961
