= Sid O'Linn =

South African sportsman (1927–2016)

- O'Linn as a Charlton player

Personal information
- Full name: Sidney O'Linn
- Born: 5 May 1927; Oudtshoorn, Cape Province
- Died: 11 December 2016 (aged 89); Randburg, South Africa
- Batting: Left-handed
- Role: Wicket-keeper

International information
- National side: South Africa (1960–1961)
- Test debut: 9 June 1960 v England
- Last Test: 26 December 1961 v New Zealand

Domestic team information
- Years: Team
- 1945/46–1946/47: Western Province
- 1951–1954: Kent
- 1957/58–1965/66: Transvaal

Career statistics
Competition	Tests	First-class
Matches	7	92
Runs scored	297	4,525
Batting average	27.00	35.62
100s/50s	0/2	4/29
Top score	98	120*
Balls bowled	0	256
Wickets	–	2
Bowling average	–	59.50
5 wickets in innings	–	0
10 wickets in match	–	0
Best bowling	–	2/14
Catches/stumpings	4/–	97/6
- Source: CricInfo, 24 October 2018
Association football career
- Position: Inside forward
Senior career*
Years	Team	Apps	(Gls)
1947–1956	Charlton Athletic	187	(32)
International career
1947	South Africa	2	(1)
- * Club domestic league appearances and goals

Sidney O'Linn (5 May 1927 – 11 December 2016) was a South African sportsman who played Test cricket in seven Tests for South Africa between 1960 and 1961 and professional football for South Africa.

Born Sidney Olinsky into a Jewish family, he was a left-hander who batted down the order. He was a member of the South African tour of England in 1960, the first to be confronted by anti-apartheid demonstrations, and scored 98 (his highest in Tests) in six hours at Trent Bridge before being caught in the slips by Colin Cowdrey.

O'Linn was also a footballer, having played for South Africa against Australia in 1947, and later making 187 appearances for Charlton Athletic in the English First Division. While playing football in England, he played cricket for Kent County Cricket Club, where he was the deputy wicket-keeper from 1951 to 1954. He died in Randburg on 11 December 2016.
