= Jonathan Fellows-Smith =

South African cricketer and rugby union player

Personal information
- Full name: Jonathan Payn Fellows-Smith
- Born: 3 February 1932; Durban, South Africa
- Died: 28 September 2013 (aged 81); Luton, Bedfordshire, England
- Nickname: Pom Pom
- Batting: Right-handed
- Bowling: Right-arm medium

International information
- National side: South Africa

Domestic team information
- Years: Team
- 1953–1955: Oxford University
- 1957: Northamptonshire
- 1958/59–1959/60: Transvaal

Career statistics
Competition	Tests	First-class
Matches	4	94
Runs scored	166	3999
Batting average	27.66	29.40
100s/50s	0/0	5/21
Top score	35	109*
Balls bowled	114	9472
Wickets	0	149
Bowling average	–	29.62
5 wickets in innings	–	6
10 wickets in match	–	1
Best bowling	–	7/26
Catches/stumpings	2/–	69/–
- Source: Cricinfo, 3 December 2023

Jonathan Payn Fellows-Smith (3 February 1932 – 28 September 2013) was a South African cricketer who played in four Tests in 1960. He played most of his first-class cricket in England.

== Life and career ==
Fellows-Smith, nicknamed "Pom Pom", was an aggressive right-handed middle order batsman and a useful right-arm medium pace bowler who played the bulk of his cricket in England. His school education was at Durban High School. Appearing for the first time in first-class cricket as a student for Oxford University in 1953, he won his Blue that season and in the following two years as an all-rounder. He stayed in England after his university days and played fairly regularly for Northamptonshire in 1957, when the team equalled its highest-ever placing by coming second in the County Championship.

Fellows-Smith finally played his first first-class match in his native country in 1958–59, turning out regularly for Transvaal that season, and the following season he scored 512 runs with two centuries at an average of 73.14, and was picked for the 1960 South African tour to England.

The tour was not a success, hampered by bad weather and overshadowed by controversy over the bowling action of the fast bowler Geoff Griffin. For much of the tour, Fellows-Smith batted very low in the batting order. He returned respectable figures of 863 runs and 32 wickets, and he played in four of the five Tests, batting at number seven or eight in three of them, but promoted to number three for the final match at The Oval. He got a reasonable start in most of his Test innings, but his top score was only 35, and he was given little opportunity with the ball and failed to take a single Test wicket.

After the 1960 tour, Fellows-Smith played one more first-class match in South Africa and just two more in England, both for Free Foresters against his former university. In 1966, he played Minor Counties cricket for Hertfordshire.

Fellows-Smith was also a rugby union player who won a Blue for Oxford.
