= Syd Buller =

English cricketer and umpire

Syd Buller MBE

Personal information
- Full name: John Sydney Buller
- Born: 23 August 1909; Wortley, West Yorkshire England
- Died: 7 August 1970 (aged 60); Edgbaston Cricket Ground, Birmingham, England
- Batting: Right-handed
- Role: Wicket-keeper

Domestic team information
- Years: Team
- 1930: Yorkshire
- 1935–1946: Worcestershire

Umpiring information
- Tests umpired: 33 (1956–1969)

Career statistics
Competition	First-class
Matches	112
Runs scored	1,746
Batting average	13.74
100s/50s	0/2
Top score	64
Catches/stumpings	177/73
- Source: CricInfo, 27 February 2010

John Sydney Buller MBE (23 August 1909 – 7 August 1970) was an English first-class cricketer and international umpire. He was a wicket-keeper.

== Playing career ==
Buller was born in Wortley near Leeds in Yorkshire. As a player, he was a competent wicket-keeper and lower-order right-hand bat. He played for Worcestershire between 1935 and 1946, having played once for Yorkshire in 1930. In 1939, he was severely injured in the car crash that killed Worcestershire opening batsman Charlie Bull, on the Sunday evening of the Whitsun match with Essex, and missed the next two months of cricket.

== Umpire ==
He made his debut as a first-class umpire in 1951. He umpired in 33 Tests between 1956 and 1969. He was awarded the MBE in 1965. In August 1970, Buller collapsed and died at Edgbaston, Birmingham, during a break for rain, when officiating in a match between Warwickshire and Nottinghamshire.

A fearless umpire, he repeatedly called Geoff Griffin for throwing in the exhibition match staged following the early conclusion of the Lord's Test between England and South Africa in 1960, after Frank Lee had called him during the Test itself. This had the effect of ending Griffin's Test career.
