= Godfrey Steyn =

South African cricketer (1934–2015)

Personal information
- Born: 23 August 1934; Pretoria, South Africa
- Died: 14 June 2015 (aged 80); Pretoria, South Africa
- Source: Cricinfo, 25 March 2016

Godfrey Steyn (23 August 1934 – 14 June 2015) was a South African cricketer. He played first-class cricket for North Eastern Transvaal, Transvaal and Western Province.
