= Jackie McGlew =

South African cricketer (1929–1998)

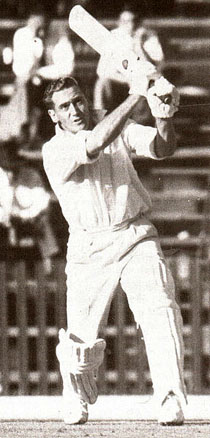
- Jackie McGlew

Personal information
- Born: 11 March 1929; Pietermaritzburg, South Africa
- Died: 8 June 1998 (aged 69); Pretoria, South Africa
- Batting: Right-handed
- Bowling: Legbreak

International information
- National side: South Africa
- Test debut: 7 June 1951 v England
- Last Test: 16 February 1962 v New Zealand

Career statistics
Competition	Test	First-class
Matches	34	190
Runs scored	2,440	12,170
Batting average	42.06	45.92
100s/50s	7/10	27/68
Top score	255*	255*
Balls bowled	32	1,962
Wickets	0	35
Bowling average	–	26.62
5 wickets in innings	–	0
10 wickets in match	–	0
Best bowling	–	2/4
Catches/stumpings	18/–	103/–
- Source: CricInfo, 3 December 2020

Derrick John "Jackie" McGlew (11 March 1929 − 8 June 1998) was a cricketer who played for Natal and South Africa. He was educated at Merchiston Preparatory School and Maritzburg College, where he was Head Dayboy Prefect and captain of both cricket and rugby in 1948.

McGlew was picked for the 1951 tour to England on the strength of a century in a 12-a-side match, and was not a success in his two Test matches. But within 18 months, he was both a fixture in the Test side and vice-captain as South Africa held the strong Australians to a series draw in 1952–53. And in the same season he hit what was then South Africa's highest Test innings, an undefeated 255, against New Zealand at Wellington.

McGlew was the South Africans' most successful batsman on his second tour of England in 1955, scoring centuries at Old Trafford and Headingley. He captained the side in two Tests because of injury to the tour captain, Jack Cheetham. South Africa won both matches, and Cheetham wanted McGlew to remain as captain for the Fifth Test even though Cheetham was fit, but he was over-ruled by the other members of the selection committee. In 1956, for his efforts on the tour, McGlew was named as a Wisden Cricketer of the Year with Wisden contrasting the dourness of his batting with the liveliness of his fielding in the covers.

Dourness reached new levels in 1957–58 in the home Test series against Australia: at Durban, McGlew took 313 minutes to reach 50, and the 545 minutes he took to get to 100 was the world record for the slowest century in first-class cricket until declining over-rates in the 1970s took all such timed records away. In all, he batted 575 minutes for 105, but South Africa failed to win because there was not enough time left to bowl Australia out twice. Wisden praised the innings as a feat of concentration and endurance but added: "It is doubtful whether South Africa benefited by it." McGlew's third tour of England in 1960 saw him captain the side. He had a poor Test series, and the tour was blighted by controversy over the bowling action of the South African fast bowler, Geoff Griffin, who was no-balled for throwing at Lord's. McGlew retired from Test cricket after the 1961–62 series against New Zealand, in which he scored his seventh and final Test century. In all, he captained South Africa in 13 Tests, winning four and losing five. He scored 2,440 Test runs at an average of more than 42.

A useful before lunch and afternoon tea bowler, he took no test wickets with his leg breaks, but did reap a hat-trick for Natal against Transvaal in 1963–64, with the wickets spread over two innings. His best bowling figures in a single innings were only two wickets for four runs.

Batting at number eight or nine, he played some useful innings while leading Natal to victory in the Currie Cup in 1966–67, then retired from first-class cricket.

In retirement, he briefly threw in his hat with pro-apartheid politics at one point standing as a candidate for the ruling National Party, before moving into business. In 1991–92, when post-apartheid South Africa was re-admitted to world cricket, he was picked as manager of the first visit by a South African team to the West Indies, the Under-19 tour.

Preceded by Clive van Ryneveld	South African Test cricket captain 1960 – 1961/2	Succeeded by Trevor Goddard
