= Neil Adcock =

South African cricketer

Personal information
- Born: 8 March 1931
- Died: 6 January 2013 (aged 81)
- Batting: Right-handed
- Bowling: Right-arm fast

International information
- National side: South Africa
- Test debut: 11 December 1953 v New Zealand
- Last Test: 16 February 1962 v New Zealand

Career statistics
Competition	Test	First-class
Matches	26	99
Runs scored	146	451
Batting average	5.40	5.50
100s/50s	0/0	0/0
Top score	24	41
Balls bowled	6,391	19,708
Wickets	104	405
Bowling average	21.10	17.25
5 wickets in innings	5	19
10 wickets in match	0	4
Best bowling	6/43	8/39
Catches/stumpings	4/–	24/–
- Source: Cricinfo, 3 December 2020

Neil Amwin Treharne Adcock (8 March 1931 – 6 January 2013) was a South African international cricketer who played in 26 Test matches. A tall aggressive fast bowler, he could lift the ball sharply off a length. He was the first South African fast bowler to take 100 Test wickets.

== Life ==
Adcock was born on 8 March 1931 in Sea Point, Cape Town.

While his father was away on active service he began to play cricket. He stayed with people on a farm at Besters near Ladysmith in Natal (now KwaZulu-Natal).

His schooling was at St. Charles at Maritzburg, KwaZulu-Natal, Grey High School at Port Elizabeth (now Gqeberha), and at Jeppe High School in Johannesburg.

He made his Test debut in 1953 at home against New Zealand, after only nine first-class games. He finished the series with 24 wickets, including 8 for 87 in the two innings of his second Test.

Adcock was one of the five Wisden Cricketers of the Year in 1961. The previous year in South Africa's tour of England he took 26 wickets in the Tests and 108 wickets in total at an average of 14. In doing so he became the only fast bowler to take more than 100 wickets in a tour of England. It was a controversial tour with his bowling partner Geoff Griffin being no-balled for throwing.

After retiring from cricket he became a radio commentator and worked in the travel industry. Neil Adcock was survived by his wife Maureen, his children from his first marriage to Diana (née Devine) Adcock, daughter Susan Dance, his son Alan and three grandchildren.
