= Jack Cheetham =

South African cricketer

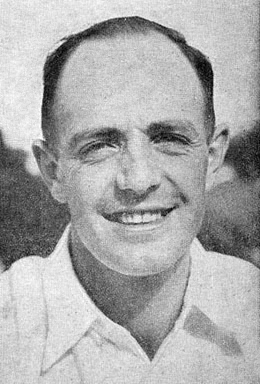
- Cheetham in 1952

Personal information
- Full name: John Erskine Cheetham
- Born: 26 May 1920; Cape Town, South Africa
- Died: 21 August 1980 (aged 60); Johannesburg, South Africa
- Batting: Right-handed
- Bowling: Legbreak

International information
- National side: South Africa
- Test debut: 5 March 1949 v England
- Last Test: 13 August 1955 v England

Career statistics
Competition	Test	First-class
Matches	24	108
Runs scored	883	5,697
Batting average	23.86	42.20
100s/50s	0/5	8/33
Top score	89	271*
Balls bowled	6	613
Wickets	0	8
Bowling average	–	47.00
5 wickets in innings	–	0
10 wickets in match	–	0
Best bowling	–	2/38
Catches/stumpings	13/–	66/–
- Source: Cricinfo, 12 August 2021

John Erskine Cheetham (26 May 1920 – 21 August 1980) was a South African cricketer who played in 24 Test matches between 1949 and 1955, captaining South Africa in his last 15 Test matches. He later served as president of the South African Cricket Association.

== Cricket playing career ==
A middle-order batsman, Cheetham captained South Africa from 1952 to 1955, leading them to a drawn series in Australia in 1952–53, victories away and at home to New Zealand in the 1952–53 season and the 1953–54 season, and a narrow 3–2 defeat in England in 1955.

He played for Western Province from 1939–40 to 1954–55. Playing against Orange Free State in December 1951 he scored 271 not out, which was the highest score ever made in the Currie Cup. Five days later Eric Rowan took the record from him, with 277 not out for Transvaal against Griqualand West.

Rodney Hartman said of him: "Cheetham, the archetype gentleman, embodied the best virtues of sportsmanship and human endeavour, and was always held up as the ideal kind of man to captain his country."

== Cricket administration ==
Cheetham became an administrator, rising to serve as president of the South African Cricket Association (SACA) in 1969. A popular and efficient administrator, he "was not a particularly political person", and found himself caught up in the political mess that began to damage South African cricket at the time.

During the D'Oliveira affair in 1968, when Cheetham was vice-president of the SACA, the apartheid regime used him as an emissary to the MCC in their efforts to ensure that Basil D'Oliveira, a South African-born mixed-race cricketer, would not be picked to represent England on the forthcoming tour of South Africa. At the time the SACA supported segregation of all sport, as required by the regime. On arrival in England Cheetham delivered a letter from the SACA which promised nothing on D'Oliveira, and he was then used by the MCC to deliver a message back to South Africa that "the MCC would do almost anything to see that the tour is on".

In late 1969, eager for South Africa to continue as a Test-playing nation, Cheetham announced that in future all South African teams would be selected on merit, regardless of race. His statement was immediately repudiated by the Prime Minister, John Vorster, in his New Year's address. Cheetham continued to strive unsuccessfully to find a way to make South African cricket acceptable to the rest of the cricket-playing nations until he retired from the presidency in 1972.

== Outside cricket ==
Cheetham served in the Middle East during the Second World War. He graduated from the University of Cape Town and worked as an engineer for the construction company Murray & Roberts and later as a director. After he died, the company instituted the Jack Cheetham Memorial Award to recognise those who have done outstanding work promoting sport in disadvantaged communities.

== Books by Cheetham ==
- Caught by the Springboks (1953) (about the South African tour of Australia and New Zealand, 1952–53)
- I Declare (1956) (about the South African tour of England, 1955)
