= Geoff Griffin =

South African cricketer (1939–2006)

Personal information
- Full name: Geoffrey Merton Griffin
- Born: 12 June 1939; Greytown, Natal Province, Union of South Africa
- Died: 16 November 2006 (aged 67); Durban, KwaZulu-Natal, South Africa
- Batting: Right-handed
- Bowling: Right-arm fast

International information
- National side: South Africa
- Test debut: 9 June 1960 v England
- Last Test: 23 June 1960 v England

Career statistics
| Competition | Test | First-class |
|---|---|---|
| Matches | 2 | 42 |
| Runs scored | 25 | 895 |
| Batting average | 6.25 | 17.89 |
| 100s/50s | 0/0 | 0/5 |
| Top score | 14 | 73 |
| Balls bowled | 432 | 6,581 |
| Wickets | 8 | 108 |
| Bowling average | 24.00 | 21.51 |
| 5 wickets in innings | 0 | 4 |
| 10 wickets in match | 0 | 1 |
| Best bowling | 4/87 | 7/11 |
| Catches/stumpings | 0/– | 19/– |
- Source: CricketArchive, 20 July 2021

Geoffrey Merton Griffin (12 June 1939 – 16 November 2006) was a Test cricketer who toured England with the South African cricket team in 1960, appearing in two Test matches. A right-arm, fast bowler and lower order batsman, his selection for the tour was controversial, because of his suspect bowling action – some of his deliveries were judged to be thrown rather than bowled. The core of his problem was that, due to a childhood accident, he was unable to fully straighten his right arm.

During the 1960 tour he was no-balled for throwing in several matches prior to the Test series, but retained his place in the side nevertheless. In his second Test appearance, at Lord's in June 1960, he became the first South African cricketer to take a hat-trick in a Test match, and also the first cricketer of any nationality to do so at Lord's. In the same match, however, he was no-balled for throwing eleven times, and again in an exhibition match that followed the match's early conclusion. These events ended his international career, and after fruitless attempts to resolve his problem, he retired from cricket in 1963, at the age of 23.

Griffin was unfortunate to emerge on the international scene at a time when cricketing authorities were particularly concerned about the growing proliferation of bowlers with dubious actions and were determined to eradicate it. He, along with others, was convinced that he had been made a scapegoat to ensure that certain bowlers would be omitted from the Australian side due to tour England in 1961. After 1960 the throwing controversy largely subsided as an issue in international cricket.

== Life ==
=== Early life and cricket career ===
Griffin was born in Graytown, Natal, on 12 June 1939. He received his education at Durban High School, where he excelled at many sports: cricket, athletics (he held provincial titles for high jump, triple jump and pole vault), and Rugby football (in which he played for the provincial under-19 XV). After leaving school he made his debut for Natal's Cricket XI in the 1957–58 season, and played regularly in 1958–59. In 1959–60 he returned bowling figures for the season of 35 wickets for an average of 12.23, heading the national bowling averages. His figures included 7 wickets for 11 runs in the extraordinary Currie Cup match at East London on 19–21 December 1959, in which Natal dismissed Border for 16 and 18. These performances were significant, because a Test tour of England was scheduled for 1960, and South Africa were looking for a partner for their star fast bowler Neil Adcock. Griffin was duly selected, at 20 the team's youngest player.

These early successes with Natal were, however, marked with a degree of controversy about Griffin's bowling action. As the result of an accident when a schoolboy, he could not fully straighten his right (bowling) arm; he experienced problems with his action while at school, and was twice no-balled for throwing during the 1958–59 season while bowling for Natal, although he escaped censure in the 1959–60 season. According to Griffin's Wisden obituarist many years later, his bent arm "allied to an open-chested action, with front foot splayed towards gully, made him look more like a baseball pitcher than a conventional bowler". John Waite, Griffin's future Test colleague, batting for Transvaal against Natal in 1958–59, says he informed the umpire that Griffin was throwing. The umpire replied: "You concentrate on batting, and leave the umpiring to me."

It was Griffin's misfortune that his emergence as a possible Test bowler occurred at a time when the matter of illegal bowling was an issue of considerable and rising concern among cricket's international authorities. Incidents in a recent England tour to Australia had brought the issue to the fore; South Africa were, therefore taking some risk in selecting Griffin.

=== Throwing controversy: background ===
The Laws of Cricket, in their various formulations, had always specified that the ball delivered to the batsman must be bowled, not thrown – that is, the bowler's arm must be straight at the point of delivery. This rule had, from time to time, created problems in the game. Around the turn of the 19th and 20th centuries the Australian umpire Jim Phillips no-balled the Australian fast bowler Ernie Jones for throwing; the same umpire ended the career of England's star bowler Arthur Mold by declaring his bowling action illegal. Fifty years later, during South Africa's 1951 tour of England, the umpire Frank Chester wanted to no-ball the South African quick bowler Cuan McCarthy, but was told by the Lord's authorities to desist: "These people are our guests". England's Tony Lock was called for throwing during a Test Match in the West Indies, in 1953–54 (he subsequently remodelled his bowling action). The issue arose again during England's 1958–59 Australian tour, which was dominated by the suspect actions of four Australian bowlers: Ian Meckiff, Gordon Rorke, Keith Slater and Jim Burke; Jack Fingleton, the former Australian batsman, provocatively entitled his account of the series Four Chukkas to Australia. Neither England's captain, Peter May, nor the tour manager, Freddie Brown, raised the issue publicly during the series, but did so afterwards, causing considerable concern to the leading administrators on each side, Gubby Allen and Sir Donald Bradman. The principal issue in these administrators' minds was what would happen if these bowlers were brought to England in 1961, when the Australians were due to visit. They decided that the matter had to be resolved before then, and accordingly they resolved to adopt what they termed a "zero tolerance" policy during the intervening period, especially with regard to the forthcoming 1960 tour to England by South Africa.

=== South African tour of England, 1960 ===
==== Early matches ====
Griffin's first match of the 1960 tour was against Derbyshire, on 7–10 May. During this game the umpire Paul Gibb called the Derbyshire fast bowler Harold Rhodes six times for throwing, but Griffin remained unmolested. He took three wickets in his side's easy victory. In his next county game, against Essex, on 14–17 May, Griffin again escaped attention from the umpires, but members of the media, including the writer and former Test bowler Ian Peebles, wrote that "there was something amiss". The following week, in the match against the MCC at Lord's on 21–24 May, Griffin was called for throwing by both umpires, John Langridge and Frank Lee, the first member of any touring side to be thus called. When, a few days later, he was called again in the match against Nottinghamshire, it was clear that some action needed to be taken.

The immediate step was to send Griffin to the indoor cricket school run by the former England bowler Alf Gover, in Wandsworth. This treatment seemed to help, but at the same time to reduce Griffin's effectiveness. He returned to the side, and was duly selected to play in the First Test, at Birmingham, on 9–14 June. Langridge was one of the umpires, but the match passed without official incident, Griffin taking two wickets in each of England's innings in a game comprehensively lost by the tourists. However, a week later in Southampton, in the match against Hampshire, Griffin was called again, so his inclusion in the South African side for the Second Test at Lord's, on 23–27 June, was something of a risk.

==== Lord's Test, 23–27 June, and after ====
At Lord's, England batted first and scored 362. The match provided mixed fortunes for the beleaguered bowler. In the third over of the innings, Griffin was no-balled by umpire Frank Lee, and ten further times by the same umpire, before the innings closed in sensational fashion. In three successive balls, Griffin had Mike Smith caught behind for 99, Peter Walker bowled for 52, and Fred Trueman bowled for 0, to record the first-ever hat-trick in a Test at Lords. South Africa were then twice bowled out cheaply, the match ending with their defeat early on the afternoon of Monday 26 June. Because a visit from the Queen was scheduled for later that afternoon, to fill the available time the teams agreed to play an exhibition match of 20 overs per side.

In the exhibition match, despite its informal nature, the umpires Lee and Syd Buller chose to apply the Laws of cricket strictly. Bowling at half-pace from a shortened run, Griffin was no-balled by Buller for throwing on four occasions. When the South African captain, Jackie McGlew, remonstrated, Buller replied: "We are playing to the Laws, which I must abide by". Griffin was allowed to finish the over by bowling underarm, but was then pedantically no-balled again by Lee, standing at square leg, for failing to notify him of the change of action. These events provoked both great sympathy for the player and contempt for the authorities. The South African writer Louis Duffus challenged Buller's intransigency concerning the Laws; the exhibition match, he said, was being played outside the "strict tenets of play", because of the arrangement that every player was required to bowl. McGlew later wrote: "My own feeling at that moment was that cricket, its laws and their application, had been reduced to complete and utter farce." There was general anger that the South African management had exposed Griffin to the Lord's Test, given the high likelihood of an incident; the management's response was to blame the press for stirring up the trouble.

==== Subsequent matches ====
The events at Lord's finished Griffin as a bowler on the tour. He remained with the team, and played in a number of subsequent matches as a specialist batsman, generally in the lower order, but on a couple of occasions as an opener. He made a few useful scores, including 65 not out against Lancashire in his next match after the Lord's Test, and 37 in the final match of the tour, against T.N. Pearce's XI at the Scarborough Festival in September.

Griffin was praised in The Cricketer magazine for "the superb manner in which he has taken [his] misfortune". A final attempt to analyse and perhaps correct his bowling action was made in the nets at Lord's, during the tourists' match against Middlesex in mid-July. In front of Bradman and McGlew, he bowled wearing a specially designed surgical brace on his arm, but the experiment came to nothing.

=== Late career, retirement, later life ===
After the tour, Griffin was approached by a lawyer who offered to bring the issue to court, assuring the bowler that he would win if he brought a case against the authorities, but Griffin declined, not wishing, he said, "to sully the great game further". He returned to South Africa, and attempted to revive his cricket career there. He moved from Natal to Rhodesia, and played a few times for his new state, but this ended after he was repeatedly no-balled in a match at Salisbury, against North-Eastern Transvaal, in 1962–63. At the age of 23 he retired from first-class cricket. He continued his involvement with the game at club level and as a coach, while pursuing a new career in hotel management.

Griffin died on 16 November 2006 at the age of 67, after collapsing while attending a dinner held at his old school, Durban High. In all first-class cricket he played 42 matches, taking 108 wickets for 2324 runs, averaging 21.51. With the bat he scored 895 runs, av. 17.90, with a highest score of 73. He held 19 catches. In his two Tests he took 8 wickets, averaging 24.00, and scored 25 runs, av. 6.25.

== Aftermath ==
Not everyone was convinced that Griffin threw rather than bowled the ball. The former England batsman Denis Compton wrote: "I am sure the umpires have been too severe on this boy. Certainly he has a bent elbow, but he cannot straighten it because of physical disability. I have seen bowlers with far more suspect actions get away with it. And I will say definitely that Griffin does not throw". Against this, the South African commentator Charles Fortune was convinced that Griffin threw, as were his team-mates Waite and Adcock. Fortune questioned the wisdom of the selectors in sending Griffin to England: "they chanced their arm", he wrote. The England batsman Peter Walker, who played at Lord's, was unequivocal: "There was absolutely no doubt in either Mike [Smith]'s or my mind that he threw virtually every ball".

Some believed that Griffin had been deliberately scapegoated, as part of a conspiracy to ensure that Australia's suspect bowlers were excluded from the forthcoming 1961 tour of England. In support of the conspiracy theory the journalist Martin Chandler, in his analysis of the throwing controversy, writes that umpire Lee may have been instructed by Allen, during a rain break in England's innings in the Lord's Test, to take a firmer line against Griffin, who had largely escaped attention in the match at that point in time, but was afterwards called on six occasions in rapid succession. According to Griffin's later account, after the match Bradman came to the tourists' dressing room to offer sympathy, and claimed that Allen had ordered Buller to "call Griffin out of the game". Griffin asserted: "I was the victim of a thoroughly distasteful 'chucking' conspiracy. I was the fall guy. I attribute the blame to the SA cricket authorities and the MCC who should never have allowed things to develop as they did".

In the event, none of Australia's suspect quartet was selected for the 1961 tour. Burke retired from Test cricket after the 1958–59 series; Slater did not add to the one cap he gained during that series, and Rorke's international career had ended by December 1959. Meckiff played on until December 1963, when he was no-balled four times by the umpire Colin Egar during the first Test of a series against South Africa. He then retired from all forms of the game. In cricket generally, the throwing controversy rumbled on in low-key fashion, but did not re-emerge in Tests until 1995, when the Sri Lankan bowler Muttiah Muralitharan was no-balled for throwing seven times in Melbourne. Analysis through modern technology, however, demonstrated that every bowler, on delivery of the ball, flexed his arm to some extent, and the Laws were changed to reflect this; a 15-degree elbow bend was thenceforth permitted. Had this rule been applied in Griffin's day, it might have saved him.
