= List of international cricket five-wicket hauls by Clarrie Grimmett =

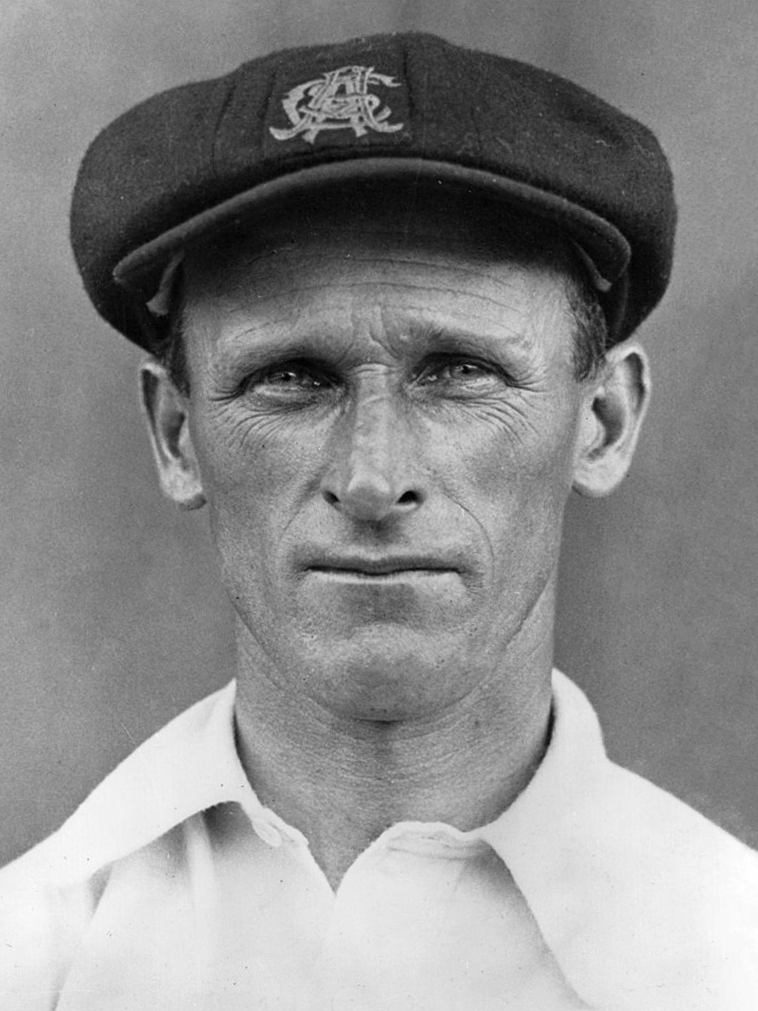
Clarrie Grimmett in 1932

In cricket, a five-wicket haul (also known as a "five–for" or "fifer") refers to a bowler taking five or more wickets in a single innings. This is regarded as a notable achievement, and as of August 2014 only 23 bowlers have taken at least 20 five-wicket hauls at international level in their cricketing careers.

Clarence Victor "Clarrie" Grimmett (25 December 1891 – 2 May 1980), a leg spinner and right-hand batsman, was born in New Zealand though he played the bulk of his cricket in Australia. He is thought by many to be one of the finest early spin bowlers, and is usually credited as the developer of the flipper. Grimmett made his first-class debut for Wellington at the age of 17. At that time, New Zealand was not a Test cricketing nation, and in 1914 he moved to neighbouring Australia to further his career.

Grimmett played 37 Tests between 1924 and 1936, taking 216 wickets at an average of just 24.21 runs apiece. He took a five-wicket haul on debut against England in Sydney in 1925. He became the first bowler to reach the milestone of taking 200 Test wickets, and is one of only four Test bowlers that played in their first Test after the age of thirty to take more than 100 wickets, the other three beings Dilip Doshi, Saeed Ajmal and Ryan Harris. He took an average of six wickets per match. Many wickets in the last four years of his Test career were taken bowling in tandem with fellow leg-spinner Bill O'Reilly. Grimmett remains the only bowler with career figures of over 200 wickets in fewer than 40 Tests. He took a five-wicket 'bag' on 21 occasions, seven times finishing with ten wickets or more in a match.

Grimmett was a Wisden Cricketer of the Year in 1931, the same year as Donald Bradman. He died in Adelaide in 1980, and was posthumously inducted into the Australian Cricket Hall of Fame in 1996 as one of the ten inaugural members.

On 30 September 2009, Clarrie Grimmett was inducted into the ICC Cricket Hall of Fame.

== Key ==
Key
Symbol	Meaning
Date	Starting day of the match
Inn	Innings of the match in which the five-wicket haul was taken
Overs	Number of overs bowled in that innings
Runs	Runs conceded
Wkts	Number of wickets taken
Econ	Bowling economy rate (average runs per over)
Batsmen	Batsmen whose wickets were taken in the five-wicket haul
Result	Result for Australia in that match
*	One of two five-wicket hauls by Grimmett in a match
†	10 wickets or more taken in the match

== Test five-wicket hauls ==
Five-wicket hauls in Test cricket by Clarrie Grimmett
No.	Date	Ground	Against	Inn	Overs	Runs	Wkts	Econ	Batsmen	Result
1	27 February 1925 *†	Sydney Cricket Ground, Sydney	England	1	11.7	45	5	2.84	Frank Woolley; J. W. Hearne; William Whysall; Roy Kilner; Arthur Gilligan	Won
2	27 February 1925 *†	Sydney Cricket Ground, Sydney	England	2	19.4	37	6	1.42	Jack Hobbs; Andy Sandham; Patsy Hendren; J. W. Hearne; William Whysall; Bert Strudwick	Won
3	10 July 1926	Headingley, Leeds	England	1	39.0	88	5	2.25	Herbert Sutcliffe; Roy Kilner; Maurice Tate; George Macaulay; Bert Strudwick	Drawn
4	30 November 1928	Exhibition Ground, Brisbane	England	2	44.1	131	6	2.96	Jack Hobbs; Phil Mead; Patsy Hendren; Percy Chapman; Maurice Tate; Harold Larwood	Lost
5	1 February 1929	Adelaide Oval, Adelaide	England	1	52.1	102	5	1.95	Herbert Sutcliffe; Douglas Jardine; George Duckworth; Maurice Tate; Jack White	Lost
6	13 June 1930 *†	Trent Bridge, Nottingham	England	1	22.0	107	5	3.34	Wally Hammond; Frank Woolley; Patsy Hendren; Harold Larwood; Maurice Tate	Lost
7	13 June 1930 *†	Trent Bridge, Nottingham	England	2	30.0	94	5	3.13	Jack Hobbs; Wally Hammond; Maurice Tate; Harold Larwood; Dick Tyldesley	Lost
8	27 June 1930	Lord's, London	England	2	53.0	167	6	3.15	Jack Hobbs; Frank Woolley; Wally Hammond; Patsy Hendren; Gubby Allen; Maurice Tate	Won
9	11 July 1930	Headingley, Leeds	England	1	56.2	135	5	2.39	Jack Hobbs; Herbert Sutcliffe; Percy Chapman; Maurice Tate; Dick Tyldesley	Drawn
10	12 December 1930 †	Adelaide Oval, Adelaide	West Indies	1	48.0	87	7	1.81	Lionel Birkett; George Headley; Frank Martin; Baron Constantine; Barto Bartlett; Ivan Barrow; Tommy Scott	Won
11	16 January 1931	Exhibition Ground, Brisbane	West Indies	2	14.3	49	5	3.37	Lionel Birkett; Ivan Barrow; Tommy Scott; George Francis; Herman Griffith	Won
12	31 December 1931	Melbourne Cricket Ground, Melbourne	South Africa	2	46.0	92	6	2.00	Syd Curnow; Bruce Mitchell; Herbie Taylor; Cyril Vincent; Quintin McMillan; Sandy Bell	Won
13	29 January 1932 *†	Adelaide Oval, Adelaide	South Africa	1	47.0	116	7	2.46	Syd Curnow; Herbie Taylor; Jock Cameron; Denys Morkel; Ken Viljoen; Quintin McMillan; Neville Quinn	Won
14	29 January 1932 *†	Adelaide Oval, Adelaide	South Africa	2	49.2	83	7	1.68	Bruce Mitchell; Jim Christy; Cyril Vincent; Ken Viljoen; Denys Morkel; Quintin McMillan; Neville Quinn	Won
15	8 June 1934	Trent Bridge, Nottingham	England	1	58.3	81	5	1.38	Cyril Walters; Herbert Sutcliffe; Maurice Leyland; George Geary; Ken Farnes	Won
16	18 August 1934	The Oval, London	England	2	26.3	64	5	2.41	Herbert Sutcliffe; Maurice Leyland; Bob Wyatt; Gubby Allen; Hedley Verity	Won
17	1 January 1936 *†	Newlands, Cape Town	South Africa	1	17.0	32	5	1.88	Jack Siedle; Eric Rowan; Chud Langton; Bob Crisp; Xen Balaskas	Won
18	1 January 1936 *†	Newlands, Cape Town	South Africa	2	36.4	56	5	1.52	Jack Siedle; Dudley Nourse; Bruce Mitchell; Ken Viljoen; Xen Balaskas	Won
19	15 February 1936 †	Old Wanderers, Johannesburg	South Africa	2	19.5	40	7	2.01	Ken Viljoen; Robert Harvey; Frank Nicholson; Chud Langton; Buster Nupen; Xen Balaskas; Eric Davies	Won
20	28 February 1936 *†	Kingsmead, Durban	South Africa	1	45.0	100	7	2.22	Jack Siedle; Herby Wade; Bruce Mitchell; Dudley Nourse; Chud Langton; Xen Balaskas; Bob Crisp	Won
21	28 February 1936 *†	Kingsmead, Durban	South Africa	2	48.0	43	6	1.52	Jack Siedle; Ken Viljoen; Robert Harvey; Chud Langton; Xen Balaskas; Edward van der Merwe	Won

== Test ten-wicket hauls ==
Clarrie Grimmett took ten wickets in a Test Match on seven occasions, and sits equal fifth on the all-time Test bowling table for "Most ten-wickets-in-a-match". Among Australian bowlers he sits equal second (with Dennis Lillee) behind Shane Warne who took ten wickets in a Test in ten matches.

Ten-wicket hauls in Test cricket by Clarrie Grimmett
No.	Figures	Match	Opponent	Venue	City	Year	Result
1	11/82	1	England	Sydney Cricket Ground	Sydney	1924–25	Won
2	10/201	10	England	Trent Bridge	Nottingham	1930	Lost
3	11/183	15	West Indies	Adelaide Oval	Adelaide	1930–31	Won
4	14/199	23	South Africa	Adelaide Oval	Adelaide	1931–32	Won
5	10/88	35	South Africa	Newlands	Cape Town	1935–36	Won
6	10/110	36	South Africa	Old Wanderers	Johannesburg	1935–36	Won
7	13/143	37	South Africa	Kingsmead	Durban	1935–36	Won
