= South African cricket team in New Zealand in 1931–32 =

International cricket tour

	New Zealand	South Africa
- Dates: 27 February – 7 March 1932
Captains	ML Page	J Cameron

Test series
- Result: South Africa won the 2-match series 2–0
Most runs	HG Vivian (173)	JAJ Christy (218)
Most wickets	HG Vivian (4)	Q McMillan (16)

The inaugural Test series between the New Zealand and South Africa national cricket teams took place in New Zealand in February and March 1932. South Africa won both matches of the two-match series. New Zealand were captained by Curly Page and South Africa by Jock Cameron.

The South African team arrived in New Zealand from Australia where they had played a five-match Test series, losing all five matches. The visit to New Zealand had not originally been part of the tour itinerary. The team played three matches in New Zealand, a first-class match against Auckland at Eden Park and two Test matches, before travelling back to Australia to play a final first-class match in Perth before returning home.

== Tour party ==
A total of 14 players made up the South African tour party, with the majority of the Australian tour party travelling to New Zealand. Reserve wicket-keeper Edward van der Merwe and the uncapped Stephen Steyn returned to South Africa in February and did not take part in the New Zealand leg of the tour. Neither man had played in any of the Test matches in Australia. (Note: Steyn never played a Test match for South Africa.)

Wicket-keeper Jock Cameron captained the South African team, with all-rounder Denys Morkel as his deputy. Jack Siedle had originally been selected as vice-captain for both kegs of the tour but withdrew as his wife was expecting a child. Xen Balaskas, who had not played in any of the five Tests in Australia, played in both Tests against New Zealand.

- Jock Cameron (captain)
- Denys Morkel (vice-captain)
- Xen Balaskas
- Sandy Bell
- Lennox Brown
- Jim Christy
- Syd Curnow
- Eric Dalton
- Bruce Mitchell
- Quintin McMillan
- Neville Quinn
- Herbie Taylor
- Ken Viljoen
- Cyril Vincent

== Test series ==
South Africa won both Test matches, both of which were played over three days with an additional rest day. The first match was played at Christchurch and the second at Wellington.

=== First Test ===
27 February–1 March 1932
Scorecard
Wisden report

New Zealand	v	South Africa
293 (114.4 overs); FT Badcock 64; Q McMillan 4/61 (19 overs)		451 (136.5 overs); B Mitchell 113; RC Blunt 2/60 (16 overs)
146 (61.5 overs); GL Weir 74*; Q McMillan 5/66 (20.5 overs)

South Africa won by an innings and 12 runs
Lancaster Park, Christchurch
Umpires: W Butler and JT Forrester

- New Zealand won the toss and chose to bat
- DC Cleverley and J Newman (both New Zealand) made their Test debuts
  28 February was a rest day

=== Second Test ===
4–7 March 1932
Scorecard
Wisden report

New Zealand	v	South Africa
364 (99.5 overs); HG Vivian 100; Q McMillan 5/125 (29 overs)		410 (141.2 overs); XC Balaskas 122*; HG Vivian 4/58 (20 overs)
193 (72 overs); HG Vivian 73; NA Quinn 4/37 (24 overs)		150/2 (41.2 overs); JAJ Christy 53; B Mitchell 53; FT Badcock 1/31 (11 overs)

South Africa won by 8 wickets
Basin Reserve, Wellington
Umpires: KH Cave and WP Page

- New Zealand won the toss and chose to bat
- 6 March was a rest day

== Other match ==
After arriving in New Zealand, the South African's played a three-day first-class fixture against Auckland. The tourists won the match by seven wickets.

23 February 1932	Auckland	v	South Africa	South Africa won by 7 wickets
Scorecard	342 (113.1 overs); AM Matheson 83; Q McMillan 4/133 (39 overs)		374 (113.3 overs); B Mitchell 123; CFW Allcot 7/75 (38.3 overs)	Eden Park, Auckland; Umpires: AD Tronson and RE Turton
Scorecard	134 (58.3 overs); CFW Allcot 39 not out B Mitchell 4/31 (12.3 overs)		105/3 (28.4 overs); B Mitchell 44 not out AM Matheson 2/53 (14.4 overs)	Eden Park, Auckland; Umpires: AD Tronson and RE Turton
Auckland won the toss and chose to bat; Three-day first-class match
