= English cricket team in South Africa in 1930–31 =

International cricket tour

England in South Africa in 1930–31
	England	South Africa
- Dates: 8 November 1930 – 10 March 1931
Captains	APF Chapman	EP Nupen (1st Test); HG Deane (2nd–3rd Test); HB Cameron (4th–5th Test)

Test series
- Result: South Africa won the 5-match series 1–0
Most runs	WR Hammond 517	B Mitchell 455
Most wickets	W Voce 23	EP Nupen 21

The England cricket team toured South Africa during the 1930–31 season, playing five Test matches against the South Africa national team and 15 tour matches (11 first-class under the banner of the Marylebone Cricket Club against local sides. The tour began on 8 November 1930 with a match against Western Province and ended on 10 March 1931 at the conclusion of another match against the same side. The five Tests were played between 24 December 1930 and 25 February 1931. The Test series was won 1–0 by South Africa, who won the first Test, with the remaining four being drawn.

== Test series ==
=== 1st Test ===
24–27 December 1930
Scorecard

South Africa	v	England
126 (52.2 overs); Q McMillan 45*; IAR Peebles 4/43 (14 overs)		193 (68.1 overs); WR Hammond 49; EP Nupen 5/63 (26.1 overs)
306 (95.2 overs); B Mitchell 72; W Voce 4/59 (27.2 overs)		211 (67.3 overs); WR Hammond 63; EP Nupen 6/87 (25.3 overs)

South Africa won by 28 runs
Old Wanderers, Johannesburg
Umpires: WT Ryan and GB Treadwell

- England won the toss and elected to field.
- SH Curnow, KG Viljoen, XC Balaskas and ES Newson (SA) made their test debuts.

=== 2nd Test ===
1–5 January 1931
Scorecard

South Africa	v	England
513/8d (192 overs); IJ Siedle 141; MW Tate 3/79 (43 overs)		350 (120.4 overs); EH Hendren 93; AJ Bell 3/53 (27 overs)
		252 (f/o) (124 overs); EH Hendren 86; RH Catterall 3/15 (12 overs)

Match drawn
Newlands, Cape Town
Umpires: JC Collings and WT Ryan

- South Africa won the toss and elected to bat.
- This was the first Test in South Africa to be played on a turf pitch; all 40 previous Test matches in the country had been played on matting, as were the following two games in this series.

=== 3rd Test ===
16–20 January 1928
Scorecard

South Africa	v	England
177 (97.2 overs); HB Cameron 41; W Voce 5/58 (29.2 overs)		223/1d (82 overs); WR Hammond 136*; CL Vincent 1/66 (25 overs)
145/8 (70 overs); HW Taylor 64*; JC White 3/33 (18 overs)

Match drawn
Kingsmead, Durban
Umpires: JC Collings and AC King

- South Africa won the toss and elected to bat.
- For the first time, eleven different counties were represented in England's team

=== 4th Test ===
13–17 February 1931
Scorecard

England	v	South Africa
442 (141.4 overs); M Leyland 91; AE Hall 4/105 (37 overs)		295 (137.5 overs); HW Taylor 72; IAR Peebles 6/63 (38.5 overs)
169/9d (51.1 overs); M Leyland 46; EP Nupen 6/46 (16.1 overs)		280/7 (96 overs); B Mitchell 74; W Voce 4/87 (32 overs)

Match drawn
Old Wanderers, Johannesburg
Umpires: JC Collings and AC King

- England won the toss and elected to bat.

=== 5th Test ===
21–25 February 1931
Scorecard

South Africa	v	England
252 (130.4 overs); B Mitchell 73; IAR Peebles 4/67 (27.4 overs)		230 (101.2 overs); MW Tate 50; CL Vincent 6/51 (31.2 overs)
219/7d (82 overs); HB Cameron 41*; IAR Peebles 3/71 (25 overs)		72/4 (14.1 overs); WR Hammond 28; IJ Siedle 1/7 (3.1 overs)

Match drawn
Kingsmead, Durban
Umpires: JC Collings and AC King

- England won the toss and elected to field.
- JAK Cochran (SA) made his Test debut.
- The start of the match was delayed by 20 minutes because the correct size bails were unavailable and the umpires had to make two sets.
