= South African cricket team in England in 1929 =

International cricket tour

The South African cricket team toured England in the 1929 season to play a five-match Test series against England. It was the first tour since 1924, though Tests has been played between the two sides in the interim with the 1927-28 England tour of South Africa.

England won the 1929 Test series, winning two matches with the other three games drawn. In first-class matches overall, the South Africans won nine games and lost seven, with 18 being drawn. There were three non-first-class matches; two of them ended in South African victories, the other was drawn.

== The South African team ==
The side was captained by Nummy Deane and he, Herbie Taylor and Bob Catterall were the only survivors from the 1924 tour. The other members of the team were: Sandy Bell, Jock Cameron, Jim Christy, Eric Dalton, Bruce Mitchell, Denijs Morkel, Quintin McMillan, Arthur Ochse, Tuppy Owen-Smith, Neville Quinn, Jack Siedle, Edward van der Merwe, and Cyril Vincent. Jacobus Duminy was temporarily co-opted on to the tour while on holiday in Europe because of injuries to other players and he played in three first-class matches, including the third Test match. Deane as captain played in 29 of the 34 first-class matches; in the games where Deane was not playing, Taylor acted as captain.

== Test series summary ==
=== First Test ===
15–18 June 1929 (3-day match)
Scorecard

England	v	South Africa
245 (81.1 overs); EH Hendren 70; AL Ochse 4/79 (25.1 overs)		250 (172.4 overs); B Mitchell 88; H Larwood 5/57 (42.4 overs)
308/4d (100 overs); WR Hammond 138*; AL Ochse 2/88 (28 overs)		171/1 (59.4 overs); RH Catterall 98; PGH Fender 1/55 (15.4 overs)

Match drawn
Edgbaston, Birmingham
Umpires: J Hardstaff and TW Oates

- England won the toss and elected to bat.
- 16 June was taken as a rest day.
- ET Killick and KS Duleepsinhji (both ENG), and B Mitchell, JAJ Christy, HGO Owen-Smith and NA Quinn (all SA) made their Test debuts.

=== Second Test ===
29 June–2 July 1929 (3-day match)
Scorecard

England	v	South Africa
302 (99.4 overs); H Sutcliffe 100; AJ Bell 6/99 (30.4 overs)		322 (131 overs); DPB Morkel 88; MW Tate 3/108 (39 overs)
312/8d (82.2 overs); M Leyland 102; AL Ochse 4/99 (20 overs)		90/5 (51 overs); JAJ Christy 41; RWV Robins 3/32 (19 overs)

Match drawn
Lord's, London
Umpires: W Bestwick and F Chester

- England won the toss and elected to bat.
- 30 June was taken as a rest day.
- J O'Connor and RWV Robins (both ENG), and EL Dalton, Q McMillan and AJ Bell (all SA) made their Test debuts.

=== Third Test ===
13–16 July 1929 (3-day match)
Scorecard

South Africa	v	England
236 (100.3 overs); RH Catterall 74; AP Freeman 7/115 (32.3 overs)		328 (107.5 overs); FE Woolley 83; NA Quinn 6/92 (29.5 overs)
275 (111.1 overs); HGO Owen-Smith 129; FE Woolley 3/35 (13.1 overs)		186/5 (52.4 overs); FE Woolley 95*; CL Vincent 3/67 (19 overs)

England won by 5 wickets
Headingley, Leeds
Umpires: LC Braund and WR Parry

- South Africa won the toss and elected to bat.
- 14 July was taken as a rest day.
- EA van der Merwe (SA) and EH Bowley (ENG) made his Test debut.

=== Fourth Test ===
27–30 July 1929 (3-day match)
Scorecard

England	v	South Africa
427/7d (128 overs); FE Woolley 154; CL Vincent 2/93 (34 overs)		130 (75.3 overs); DPB Morkel 63; AP Freeman 7/71 (32 overs)
		265 (f/o) (118.4 overs); HB Cameron 83; AP Freeman 5/100 (39.4 overs)

England won by an innings and 32 runs
Old Trafford, Manchester
Umpires: J Hardstaff and WR Parry

- England won the toss and elected to bat.
- 28 July was taken as a rest day.
- F Barratt (ENG) made his Test debut.

=== Fifth Test ===
17–20 August 1929 (3-day match)
Scorecard

England	v	South Africa
258 (101.3 overs); H Sutcliffe 104; CL Vincent 5/105 (45 overs)		492/8d (172 overs); HW Taylor 121; EW Clark 3/79 (36 overs)
264/1 (80 overs); H Sutcliffe 109*; CL Vincent 1/42 (15 overs)

Match drawn
The Oval, London
Umpires: W Bestwick and TW Oates

- South Africa won the toss and elected to field.
- 18 August was taken as a rest day.
- LEG Ames and EW Clark (both ENG) made their Test debuts.
