= Sandy Bell =

South African cricketer (1906–1985)

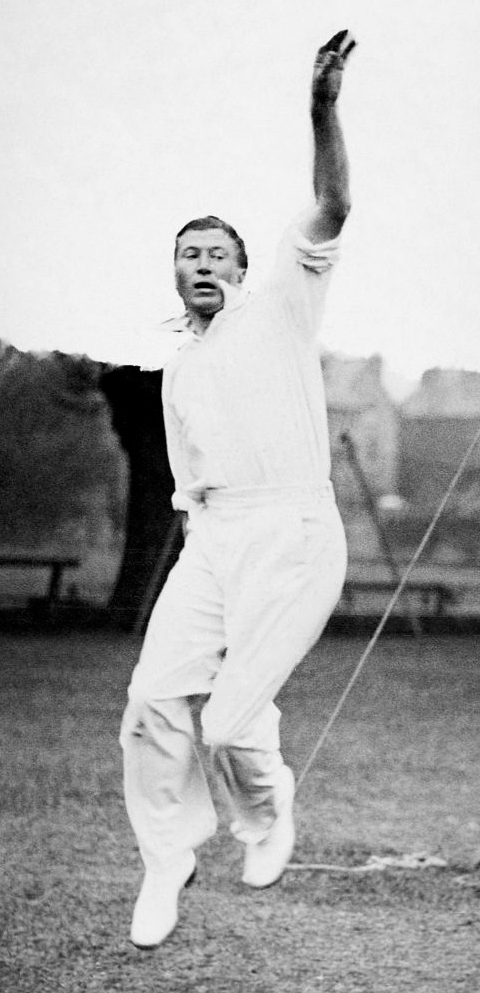
- Bell in 1935

Personal information
- Born: 15 April 1906; East London, South Africa
- Died: 1 August 1985 (aged 79); East London, South Africa
- Batting: Right-handed
- Bowling: Right-arm fast-medium

International information
- National side: South Africa
- Test debut: 29 June 1929 v England
- Last Test: 27 July 1935 v England

Career statistics
Competition	Test	First-class
Matches	16	63
Runs scored	69	311
Batting average	6.27	9.14
100s/50s	0/0	0/0
Top score	26*	32*
Balls bowled	3,342	12,047
Wickets	48	228
Bowling average	32.64	23.29
5 wickets in innings	4	10
10 wickets in match	0	1
Best bowling	6/99	8/34
Catches/stumpings	6/–	27/–
- Source: CricketArchive, 14 November 2022

Alexander John Bell (15 April 1906 – 1 August 1985) was a South African cricketer who played in 16 Test matches from 1929 to 1935.

Bell was a tail-end right-handed batsman and a right-arm fast-medium bowler. He made his first-class debut for Western Province in two matches in 1925–26 without making much impact, but returned to the team in the 1928–29 season. In his first match back, he took five Orange Free State wickets for 53 runs (and three more in the second innings). That and good performances in two other matches saw him selected for the 1929 South African tour of England.

== Tour to England in 1929 ==
As a junior member of the team, Bell played in few of the early matches, but towards the end of May he took six Gloucestershire wickets for 68 in the match at Bristol. He was then given limited opportunities in the first team in the matches leading up to the first Test match, for which he was not selected.

Injuries before the second Test to the bowlers Neville Quinn and Cyril Vincent, however, meant that he was called up for the game at Lord's. He took his opportunity: in England's first innings, following an early three-wicket burst by Denys Morkel, and then a fourth wicket for the same player, Bell took the remaining six wickets at a cost of 99 runs. Wisden Cricketers' Almanack wrote that Bell "maintained an excellent length and owed most of his success to his ability to make the ball swerve". The bowling analysis remained the best of Bell's Test career. He was not able to maintain that form, failing to take a wicket in England's second innings. But the performance, and the team's worsening injury crisis, meant he retained his place in the team for the third Test, played at Headingley. In this match, he was not successful with his bowling, but he made instead an unexpected impact with the bat: in South Africa's second innings, he came in at No 11, his customary place in the batting order, with the score on 172 for nine, a lead of only 80. He and Tuppy Owen-Smith, who made 129, then proceeded to add 103 runs for the final wicket in 65 minutes, with Bell's share an unbeaten 26, which remained his highest Test innings. The partnership was South Africa's highest for the 10th wicket and remained the record until beaten by AB de Villiers and Morne Morkel in 2010–11. Bell retained his place for the fourth match in the series, but was successful with neither ball nor bat and, after a heavy defeat for the South African team which settled the rubber in favour of England, he was dropped for the final game. In all first-class matches on the tour he took 61 wickets at an average of 27.83.

== Test cricket in South Africa ==
In his first match in South African domestic cricket after the tour, for Western Province against Eastern Province, Bell produced the best innings and match figures of his career: eight for 34 in the first innings was followed by five for 27 in the second, with all 13 victims bowled. The following year, 1930–31, England toured South Africa, and Bell kept his name in front of the selectors by taking six for 44 (and three for 44 in the second innings) for Western Province against Griqualand West in one of a limited first-class fixture list outside the tour matches that season. Bell missed out on the first Test match, which was won narrowly by South Africa, but was called into the team for the second game on an easy-paced wicket at Cape Town; he caused a small flurry of excitement by taking three quick wickets, those of Maurice Leyland, Maurice Turnbull, and Percy Chapman in a small England middle-order collapse, but the game petered out to a draw. He retained his place for the rain-ruined third Test at Durban, but the South Africans took only one wicket in the whole match, and he was dropped after this game. He was recalled for the fifth match of the series, but again made little impact. The match proved to be the last that he played in South Africa.

== Test cricket overseas ==
After 1930–31, Bell's first-class cricket was confined to two tours with the South African Test side, one to Australia and New Zealand in 1931–32 and the other to England in 1935, with a solitary further appearance for Rhodesia in 1938–39.

Bell finally became a regular Test player on the tour to Australia and New Zealand, playing in all seven Tests on the tour. The first Test was heavily influenced by the weather, rain preventing play for two days after Australia had made a total of 450, including 226 by Donald Bradman, and the South Africans then losing by an innings. Bell was the most successful South African bowler with four wickets for 123 runs. Wisden noted that "Bell bowled splendidly throughout the long innings". In terms of the result, the second Test was similar, but there was no weather excuse this time, and the South Africans lost by an innings in three days: Bell was again the most successful South African bowler in Australia's single innings, taking five wickets for 140 runs. He was much less expensive and no less effective in Australia's first innings in the third match of the series: Bell and Quinn dismissed the hosts for 198, with Bell taking five for 69 and Quinn four for 42. However, he took only one wicket in the second innings when, with a total of 554, the Australians reasserted their dominance to win the game easily.

The fourth match of the Australia series was dominated by two players: Bradman, who made an unbeaten 299 in Australia's first innings and Clarrie Grimmett, who took 14 wickets in the match. Bell was once again the most successful South African bowler and for the third match in succession took five wickets in an innings: he finished with figures of five for 142, though he failed once again to dismiss Bradman and did not take his wicket during the series. The fifth and final Test produced a similarly convincing victory for the Australians as all the other Tests, though the circumstances were very different: the South Africans were dismissed for totals of just 36 and 45 to lose by an innings to a total of just 153. Bell took three wickets for 52 runs, including the Australian captain Bill Woodfull for a first-ball duck; he also went in as nightwatchman in South Africa's second innings at the end of the first day (two innings of the match having already been completed) and stayed longer at the wicket, 45 minutes, than any of his colleagues in either innings except for Syd Curnow. Bell was comfortably the most successful South African bowler of the series, taking 23 wickets at an average of 27.26; the nearest to him in terms of both aggregate and average was Quinn was 13 wickets at 39.38.

In contrast to the whitewash suffered in Australia, the South Africans won both games against New Zealand, though Bell was not personally successful, taking only three wickets in the two games.

After the Australasian tour, Bell played no first-class cricket in any of the next three South African domestic cricket seasons. Yet he was picked for the 1935 tour to England and, in the first first-class match of the tour, took eight Worcestershire wickets for just 28 runs, including five for 22 in the second innings. Those, however, proved to be his best bowling figures of the season and he struggled with both form and fitness. He was not in the side for the first Test, but was recalled for the second match of the series at Lord's, where South Africa recorded their first-ever victory over England in England; Bell's own contribution was limited and he took only one wicket. He was a little more prominent in the third Test, taking three second innings wickets and bowling tightly when England were pushing for quick runs. And there were three further wickets for him in England's first innings in the fourth Test. On the final day of the match, however, he was unable to bowl because of what Wisden reported as "fluid on the elbow". The injury effectively ended his tour: he returned for one more match against Essex but was again unable to bowl on the last day of the match because of his injured elbow. On the tour as a whole, Bell had taken 52 first-class wickets at an average of 22.03 runs per wicket.

Bell played only one further first-class match after this, appearing for Rhodesia against the MCC team in 1938–39 and taking two expensive wickets in a game severely restricted by the weather.

== See also ==
- List of South Africa cricketers who have taken five-wicket hauls on Test debut
