= South African cricket team in Australia in 1931–32 =

International cricket tour

	Australia	South Africa
- Dates: 27 November 1931 – 16 February 1932
Captains	WM Woodfull	J Cameron

Test series
- Result: Australia won the 5-match series 5–0
Most runs	DG Bradman (806)	B Mitchell (322)
Most wickets	CV Grimmett (33)	AJ Bell (23)

The South Africa national cricket team toured Australia in the 1931–32 season and played five Test matches against Australia. Australia won the series 5–0, all of their victories being by a substantial margin, three of them by an innings.

== Test series summary ==
=== First Test ===
27, 28, 30 November, 1, 2, 3 December 1931
(Timeless Test)
Scorecard

Australia	v	South Africa
450 (137.3 overs); DG Bradman 226; AJ Bell 4/120 (42 overs)		170 (138.1 overs); B Mitchell 58; H Ironmonger 5/42 (47 overs)
		117 (f/o) (60.1 overs); HW Taylor 47; TW Wall 5/14 (15.1 overs)

Australia won by an innings and 163 runs
Brisbane Cricket Ground, Woolloongabba, Brisbane
Umpires: GE Borwick and GA Hele

- Australia won the toss and elected to bat.
- 29 November was taken as a rest day.
- There was no play on the third and fourth days.
- HC Nitschke (AUS) made his Test debut.

=== Second Test ===
18, 19, 21 December 1931
(Timeless Test)
Scorecard

South Africa	v	Australia
153 (73 overs); KG Viljoen 37; SJ McCabe 4/13 (12 overs)		469 (154.5 overs); KE Rigg 127; AJ Bell 5/140 (46.5 overs)
161 (73.3 overs); JAJ Christy 41; CV Grimmett 4/44 (20.3 overs)

Australia won by an innings and 155 runs
Sydney Cricket Ground, Sydney
Umpires: GE Borwick and GA Hele

- South Africa won the toss and elected to bat.
- 20 December was taken as a rest day.
- LS Brown (SA) and PK Lee (AUS) made their Test debuts.

=== Third Test ===
31 December 1931, 1, 2, 4, 5, 6 January 1932
(Timeless Test)
Scorecard

Australia	v	South Africa
198 (77.1 overs); KE Rigg 68; AJ Bell 5/69 (26.1 overs)		358 (188.3 overs); KG Viljoen 111; H Ironmonger 3/72 (49 overs)
554 (164.4 overs); DG Bradman 167; Q McMillan 4/150 (33 overs)		225 (115 overs); JAJ Christy 63; CV Grimmett 6/92 (46 overs)

Australia won by 169 runs
Melbourne Cricket Ground, Melbourne
Umpires: GE Borwick and GA Hele

- Australia won the toss and elected to bat.
- 3 January was taken as a rest day.

=== Fourth Test ===
29, 30 January, 1, 2 February 1932
(Timeless Test)
Scorecard

South Africa	v	Australia
308 (140.4 overs); HW Taylor 78; CV Grimmett 7/116 (47 overs)		513 (138 overs); DG Bradman 299*; AJ Bell 5/142 (40 overs)
274 (123.2 overs); B Mitchell 95; CV Grimmett 7/83 (49.2 overs)		73/0 (19.2 overs); WM Woodfull 37*

Australia won by 10 wickets
Adelaide Oval, Adelaide
Umpires: GE Borwick and GA Hele

- South Africa won the toss and elected to bat.
- 31 January was taken as a rest day.
- WA Hunt, WJ O'Reilly and HM Thurlow (all AUS) made their Test debuts.

=== Fifth Test ===
12, 13, 15 February 1932
(Timeless Test)
Scorecard

South Africa	v	Australia
36 (23.2 overs); HB Cameron 11; H Ironmonger 5/6 (7.2 overs)		153 (54.3 overs); AF Kippax 42; NA Quinn 3/29 (19.3 overs); Q McMillan 3/29 (8 overs)
45 (31.3 overs); SH Curnow 16; H Ironmonger 6/18 (15.3 overs)

Australia won by an innings and 72 runs
Melbourne Cricket Ground, Melbourne
Umpires: GE Borwick and GA Hele

- South Africa won the toss and elected to bat.
- 14 February was taken as a rest day.
- There was no play on the second day.
- JHW Fingleton and LJ Nash (both AUS) made their Test debuts.
- Clarrie Grimmett, who had taken 33 wickets in the first four Test matches, did not bowl a single ball in the match.
- The match aggregate of 234 runs is the lowest in Test match history.
- The total playing time of 5 hours and 53 minutes is still the shortest for a completed Test match.
- Donald Bradman twisted his ankle in the Australian dressing room when going out to field for the 1st South African innings and took no part in the match.

== Annual reviews ==
- Wisden Cricketers' Almanack 1933
