= Arthur Ochse =

Arthur Ochse is the name of two South African cricketers:

- Arthur Edward Ochse (1870–1918), who played in South Africa's first Tests in 1888–89
- Arthur Lennox Ochse (1899–1949), who played for South Africa in 1927–28 and 1929
