= International cricket in 1931–32 =

International cricket season

The 1931–32 international cricket season was from September 1931 to April 1932.

== Season overview ==
International tours
| Start date | Home team | Away team | Results [Matches] | | | |
| Start date | Home team | Away team | Test | ODI | FC | LA |
|---|---|---|---|---|---|---|
| 27 November 1931 | Australia | South Africa | 5–0 [5] | — | — | — |
| 20 February 1932 | Jamaica | England | — | — | 3–0 [3] | — |
| 27 February 1932 | New Zealand | South Africa | 0–2 [2] | — | — | — |

== November ==
=== South Africa in Australia ===
Test series
| No. | Date | Home captain | Away captain | Venue | Result |
|---|---|---|---|---|---|
| Test 212 | 27 Nov–3 December | Bill Woodfull | Jock Cameron | The Gabba, Brisbane | Australia by an innings and 163 runs |
| Test 213 | 18–21 December | Bill Woodfull | Jock Cameron | Sydney Cricket Ground, Sydney | Australia by an innings and 155 runs |
| Test 214 | 31 Dec–6 January | Bill Woodfull | Jock Cameron | Melbourne Cricket Ground, Melbourne | Australia by 169 runs |
| Test 215 | 29 Jan–2 February | Bill Woodfull | Jock Cameron | Adelaide Oval, Adelaide | Australia by 10 wickets |
| Test 216 | 12 – 15 February | Bill Woodfull | Jock Cameron | Melbourne Cricket Ground, Melbourne | Australia by an innings and 72 runs |

== February ==
=== England in Jamaica ===
First-class Series
| No. | Date | Home captain | Away captain | Venue | Result |
|---|---|---|---|---|---|
| Match | 20–24 February | Karl Nunes | Lionel Tennyson | Melbourne Park, Kingston | Jamaica by an innings and 97 runs |
| Match | 27 Feb–2 March | Karl Nunes | Lionel Tennyson | Sabina Park, Kingston | Jamaica by 5 wickets |
| – 14MAR1932.html Match | 10 – 14 March | Noel Nethersole | Lionel Tennyson | Sabina Park, Kingston | Jamaica by 4 wickets |

=== South Africa in New Zealand ===
Test series
| No. | Date | Home captain | Away captain | Venue | Result |
|---|---|---|---|---|---|
| Test 217 | 27 Feb–1 March | Curly Page | Jock Cameron | AMI Stadium, Christchurch | South Africa by an innings and 12 runs |
| Test 218 | 4–7 March | Curly Page | Jock Cameron | Basin Reserve, Wellington | South Africa by 8 wickets |
