= Arthur Lennox Ochse =

South African cricketer

Arthur Ochse
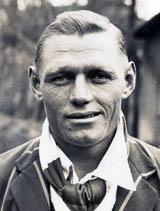

Personal information
- Full name: Arthur Lennox Ochse
- Born: 11 October 1899; Graaff-Reinet, Cape Colony
- Died: 5 May 1949 (aged 49); Middelburg, Cape Province, South Africa
- Batting: Right-handed
- Bowling: Right-arm fast
- Role: Bowler

International information
- National side: South Africa
- Test debut (cap 122): 21 January 1928 v England
- Last Test: 2 July 1929 v England

Domestic team information
- Years: Team
- 1921/22–1937/38: Eastern Province

Career statistics
Competition	Test	FC
Matches	3	45
Runs scored	11	564
Batting average	3.66	10.44
100s/50s	0/0	0/0
Top score	4*	41
Balls bowled	649	7729
Wickets	10	140
Bowling average	36.20	28.33
5 wickets in innings	0	7
10 wickets in match	0	1
Best bowling	4/79	6/37
Catches/stumpings	1/–	20/–
- Source: CricketArchive, 29 March 2012

Arthur Lennox Ochse (11 October 1899 – 5 May 1949) was a South African cricketer who played in three Tests in 1927–28 and 1929.

== Cricket career ==
Ochse was a right-arm fast bowler and lower-order right-handed batsman. He played intermittently and sometimes effectively for Eastern Province from 1921–22 to the end of the 1920s and then reappeared in two further domestic seasons in 1931–32 and 1937–38. He first came to notice by taking the last six wickets for 60 runs in a heavy defeat of Orange Free State in 1924–25. In 1927–28, when an English team toured, he was picked for a South African XI in a non-Test first-class match against the touring team and took three wickets. That performance did not get him into the Test team, but when Eastern Province played a first-class match with MCC in early January, Ochse took five wickets for 31 runs as the tourists were dismissed in their first innings for just 49; they recovered to win the match by 10 wickets courtesy of an unbroken second-innings opening stand of 187. South Africa had lost the first two Tests of the series, and Ochse was called into the side for the third match. But on a batsman's wicket at Durban he was expensive and did not take a wicket; in the second England innings, he did not bowl at all. He was dropped from the Test team after this single match and did not play again in the 1927–28 season.

In the 1928–29 season, Ochse played only one first-class game for Eastern Province against the perennially weak Orange Free State side; in taking four for 40 and then six for 37, he achieved both the best innings and best match figures of his cricket career. The bowling led to his selection for the 1929 South African tour of England.

In 1929, Ochse had a mixed tour. Wisden Cricketers' Almanack, reviewing the tour as a whole, said that the South Africans "laboured under a disadvantage in being without a fast bowler of real class". It went on: "Ochse worked hard but his limitations were somewhat pronounced." His bowling "was often very erratic". The lack of control and consistency showed in the overall first-class cricket figures, where Ochse was the most expensive of the regular bowlers on the tour, taking just 52 wickets at an average of 34.51 and conceding runs at more than three an over, expensive by contemporary standards; he also failed to take more than four wickets in any single innings. Conversely, though he was selected only for two Test matches, Ochse's figures in the Tests bore comparison with those of his colleagues, who were also badly treated by England's batsmen; Ochse finished top of the Test bowling averages with 10 wickets at 31.70 apiece. In the first Test, he took four first-innings wickets for 79 and followed that with two for 88 in the second innings, when only four England wickets fell. This was his best Test performance. In the second Test, he was wicketless but economical in England's first innings, but took four in the second innings, though his 20 overs, none of them maidens, cost 99 runs. The Times reported that Ochse was "very severely treated" by Maurice Leyland and Maurice Tate, both of whom scored centuries; it went on: "They drove his over-pitched balls as if he were a slow bowler, and when he dropped short their cutting was capable of beating the deep third man." Ochse was dropped from the Test team after this and did not play Test cricket again.

Back in South Africa, Ochse played just one match in 1929–30 and then appeared in just two further seasons, 1931–32 and 1937–38, when he played quite regularly and took wickets at reasonable cost.

== Personal life ==
Ochse married Stella Smit in June 1924 in Graaff-Reinet, where he was working as a clerk. He died in May 1949 at Eldorado Farm, Middelburg, Cape Province.

== See also ==
- Arthur Edward Ochse
