= Stephen Steyn (cricketer) =

South African cricketer (1905–1993)

Personal information
- Full name: Stephen Sebastian Louis Steyn
- Born: 11 March 1905; Cape Town, Cape Colony
- Died: 14 October 1993 (aged 88); Cape Town, Cape Province, South Africa
- Batting: Left-handed
- Relatives: Richard Steyn (son)

Domestic team information
- Years: Team
- 1924/25–1937/38: Western Province
- 1930/31: Transvaal

Career statistics
Competition	First-class
Matches	36
Runs scored	1,514
Batting average	27.03
100s/50s	3/2
Top score	261*
Balls bowled	116
Wickets	1
Bowling average	102.00
5 wickets in innings	0
10 wickets in match	0
Best bowling	1/12
Catches/stumpings	16/–
- Source: Cricinfo, 4 December 2023

Stephen Sebastian Louis Steyn (11 March 1905 – 14 October 1993) was a South African cricketer who played first-class cricket from 1924 to 1938. He toured Australia in 1931–32 with the South African team but did not play Test cricket.

== Cricket career ==
In a Currie Cup match in December 1928, Steyn scored 261 not out, taking part in an eighth-wicket partnership of 222 in 105 minutes with Denys Morkel, when Western Province made 601 in reply to Border's first innings of 151; Western Province went on to win by an innings. Steyn's score and Western Province's totals were new records for the Currie Cup, but both were surpassed later that season. The partnership of 222 remained a South African eighth-wicket record until the 21st century. It was Steyn's first century in first-class cricket.

Steyn was educated at Diocesan College in Rondebosch before going to the University of Pretoria to study for an arts degree. After Jack Siedle withdrew from the selected side, Steyn was selected as a replacement to tour Australia in 1931–32 on the understanding that he could sit his final exams in Australia. He spent the first weeks of the tour in Brisbane concentrating on his studies, and did not play his first game until mid-December, a minor match just before the Second Test. His first first-class match on the tour was against Tasmania in early January, after the Third Test. In all he played only three of the 15 first-class matches, and returned to South Africa with Edward van der Merwe before the team embarked on the New Zealand leg of the tour.

Steyn continued to play Currie Cup cricket through the 1930s, but had only moderate success, apart from an innings of 162 for Western Province against Orange Free State in 1936–37, when Western Province won by an innings.

Steyn died in Cape Town in October 1993, aged 88. His son Richard played first-class cricket in South Africa in the 1960s.
