= Bob Newson =

South African cricketer (1910–1988)

Cricket information
- Batting: Right-handed
- Bowling: Right-arm fast

International information
- National side: South Africa
- Test debut: 24 December 1930 v England
- Last Test: 3 March 1939 v England

Career statistics
Competition	Test	First-class
Matches	3	24
Runs scored	30	553
Batting average	7.50	17.83
100s/50s	0/0	1/2
Top score	16	114
Balls bowled	874	4,142
Wickets	4	60
Bowling average	66.25	26.03
5 wickets in innings	0	1
10 wickets in match	0	0
Best bowling	2/58	5/54
Catches/stumpings	3/–	13/–
- Source: Cricinfo, 14 November 2022

Edward Serrurier "Bob" Newson, OBE (2 December 1910 – 24 April 1988) was a South African cricketer who played in three Test matches in 1930–31 and 1938–39. He was also a businessman in South Africa and in Rhodesia.

== Career ==
Newson was a lower-order right-handed batsman and a right-arm fast bowler. He had a 20-year first-class cricket career, but as the career included two gaps of more than six years without a single first-class game (one of the gaps being the Second World War), he totalled only 24 matches in all, including his three Test appearances.

Newson had played just three first-class matches for Transvaal when he was picked for the first Test of the 1930–31 series against England at the age of just 20. According to his obituary in the 1989 edition of Wisden Cricketers' Almanack, he had not been notified of his selection and arrived at work on the morning of the Test as normal; his father brought his clothes to the ground in time for the start, but Newson appeared in the official match photograph in borrowed cricket gear. He batted at No 11 and in the first innings scored 10 out of a last-wicket partnership of 45 with Quintin McMillan; but he failed to take a wicket in a narrow South African victory by 28 runs, and was dropped for the next game. He did not play again that season and after two matches for Transvaal the following season he dropped out of cricket altogether for more than six years.

He reappeared in the Transvaal side at the end of the 1937–38 season and, after a couple of matches the following year, was back in the South African Test team for the fourth and fifth Tests against England in 1938–39, having taken only 21 wickets in his career and with best bowling figures to that point of just four wickets for 51 runs. In the fourth Test, which was drawn, he took one wicket in each England innings and scored 16 in South Africa's only innings. The final Test was a timeless Test, though it ended as a draw after 10 days' cricket (one of them rained off) when the English team had to leave to catch their ship home; Newson scored 1 and 3 and took two wickets in England's first innings, but failed to take any in the final innings of 654 for five. Newson played two more games for Transvaal in 1939–40 but then first-class cricket was suspended for the war.

After the war, Newson played for Rhodesia for four seasons as an all-rounder. Captaining the Rhodesia side in the match against Griqualand West in 1946–47 he scored 114, batting at No 3. And two seasons later, when the 1948–49 England team visited Rhodesia for two matches, he took five wickets in an innings for the only time in his career.
