= Syd Curnow =

South African cricketer (1907–1986)

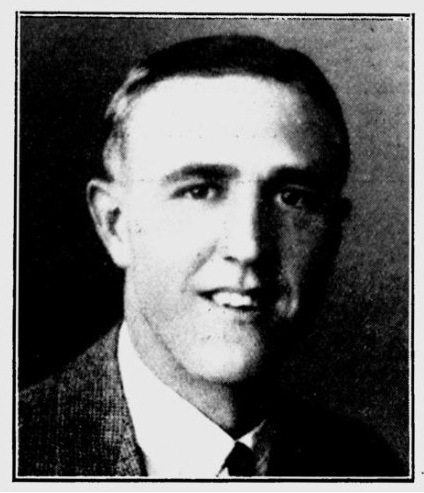

Personal information
- Full name: Sydney Harry Curnow
- Born: 16 December 1907; Benoni, Transvaal, South Africa
- Died: 28 July 1986 (aged 78); Perth, Western Australia
- Batting: Right-handed
- Role: Batsman

International information
- National side: South Africa
- Test debut: 24 December 1930 v England
- Last Test: 12 February 1932 v Australia

Career statistics
Competition	Test	First-class
Matches	7	51
Runs scored	168	3,409
Batting average	12.00	42.08
100s/50s	0/0	9/11
Top score	47	224
Catches/stumpings	5/–	18/–
- Source: Cricinfo, 8 April 2012

Sydney Harry Curnow (16 December 1907 – 28 July 1986) was a South African cricketer who played in seven Test matches in the 1930–31 and 1931–32 seasons. He was born in Benoni, Transvaal and died at Perth, Western Australia, having emigrated there in the early 1970s. His father was W. S. Curnow, a South African mining engineer, and his mother was a Miss Francis McAuliffe who came from Launceston, Tasmania.

== Test cricket ==
Curnow was a right-handed opening batsman. He made his first-class debut for Transvaal in 1928–29. In his third first-class match, the first of the 1929–30 season, he hit 99 against Natal. He followed this up with 108 in the next match, which was against Griqualand West. Then in his third match of the season he made 162 against Orange Free State. There was no Test cricket in South Africa that season, but the following year, England toured, and Curnow made an unbeaten 83 in an early-season match against the touring side. That led to his selection for the first Test match of the five-game series, but he was not a success, scoring just 13 and 8. He was dropped for the second Test, but reappeared in the South Africa side for the third and fourth Tests. In the first of these games he made 2 and 9; in the second, his scores were 7 and 12. He was dropped for the fifth Test, having scored just 51 runs in six innings in his first series.

Despite this modest record, he was picked for the South African tour to Australia and New Zealand in 1931–32, and decent scores in warm-up matches brought him back to the Test team for the first game of the five-match series. Again, he was not successful, scoring 11 and 8 – the second innings 8 taking him 71 minutes against the wiles of the 49-year-old Bert Ironmonger, who took nine wickets in the match. Dropped for the second Test, he came back into favour after an innings of 158 in a non-first-class game against a Victoria Country XI where, despite the doubtful calibre of the opposition bowling attack, the other South African front-line batsmen failed. That brought him back into the Test team for the third Test and at last, in his fifth Test match, he made some runs, scoring 47 in the first innings and 9 in the second: the 47 would prove to be his best Test score. The success was fleeting: in the fourth Test, he was out for 20 and 3. The fifth game of the series was Curnow's last-ever Test appearance and one of the most remarkable Tests of all time: a "timeless" match, spread out, because of bad weather, over three days but amounting in all to only five hours and 33 minutes of cricket, in which South Africa were dismissed in the first innings for 36 all out and then for 45 all in the second innings. Perversely, Curnow emerged from the match with some credit: his second innings 16, following a first innings 3, was South Africa's highest score of the match and the only double-figure score of the second innings (Jock Cameron had scored 11 in the first innings). Ironmonger took 11 wickets in the match and Clarrie Grimmett, who had taken 33 wickets in the first four games of the series, did not even get to bowl. The South African team moved on from Australia to play matches in New Zealand, including two Tests, but Curnow was not picked for any of the games there.

== Later career ==
After the tour to Australia and New Zealand, Curnow was a part-time and domestic-only cricketer, restricted to a few appearances each season always around the Christmas period. On his return to domestic cricket in South Africa in 1932–33 he had his most successful season, with 641 runs in four matches and a batting average of 91.57. In the first match of the season for Transvaal against Western Province he made an unbeaten 192 to lead his team to a six-wickets victory after they had been 156 behind on the first innings. Then a week later in a first-class match between North and South he made 224, the highest score of his career.

But he was less successful in 1933–34 and 1934–35, failing to pass 50 in either season and he did not feature in the 1935 tour to England. He continued to play sporadically through to the Second World War, making centuries in three of the four seasons between 1936 and 1940, with a further century in a wartime first-class match in 1942–43. When more normal cricket resumed in 1945–46, he played three further games for Transvaal, but with limited success, and those were his final games in first-class cricket.
