= Richard Steyn =

South African biographer, newspaper editor and cricketer

Personal information
- Full name: Richard Stephen Steyn
- Born: 13 January 1944 (age 82); Kenilworth, Cape Town, Cape Province, South Africa
- Batting: Right-handed
- Bowling: Right-arm off-spin
- Relatives: Stephen Steyn (father)

Domestic team information
- Years: Team
- 1963/64–1966/67: South African Universities
- 1965/66–1966/67: Western Province
- 1968/69: Natal B

Career statistics
| Competition | First-class |
|---|---|
| Matches | 20 |
| Runs scored | 451 |
| Batting average | 19.60 |
| 100s/50s | 0/1 |
| Top score | 58* |
| Balls bowled | 2,984 |
| Wickets | 46 |
| Bowling average | 27.67 |
| 5 wickets in innings | 3 |
| 10 wickets in match | 0 |
| Best bowling | 6/40 |
| Catches/stumpings | 11/– |
- Source: Cricinfo, 5 December 2023

Richard Stephen Steyn (born 13 January 1944) is a South African newspaper editor, historian and first-class cricketer.

== Life and career ==
Steyn was born in Cape Town in January 1944, the son of Stephen Steyn, who played first-class cricket in South Africa in the 1920s and 1930s. While attending Stellenbosch University, he played cricket for the South African Universities team for several years in the 1960s.

Steyn was an off spin bowler and useful lower-order batsman. In his second first-class match, playing for South African Universities against the touring MCC in December 1964, he scored 33 (the top score) and 21 and took 5 for 84 in an innings defeat. He was selected to play for a South African Invitation XI against the MCC later that season, but was less successful. He toured England with South African Universities in 1967, captaining the team in some of their matches. His best first-class bowling figures were 6 for 40 for Natal B against Orange Free State in the Currie Cup in 1968–69. He played no further first-class cricket after that season.

Steyn practised as a lawyer before taking up journalism. He edited The Natal Witness in Pietermaritzburg from 1975 to 1990, was a Nieman Fellow at Harvard University in 1985–86, and was editor in chief of The Star in Johannesburg from 1990 to 1995. He served as Standard Bank's Director of Corporate Affairs and Communications from 1996 to 2001, before returning to writing. He has since written several histories and biographies based on South African history in the first half of the 20th century.

Steyn and his wife Elizabeth have two sons.

== Books ==
- Hoisting the Standard: 150 Years of Standard Bank (2012)
- Jan Smuts: Unafraid of Greatness (2015)
- Churchill & Smuts: The Friendship (2017)
- Louis Botha: A Man Apart (2018)
- Seven Votes: How WWII Changed South Africa Forever (2020)
- Milner: Last of the Empire-Builders (2022)
