= Walter Page (umpire) =

New Zealand cricket umpire

Personal information
- Full name: Walter Patrick Page
- Born: 1875
- Died: 23 September 1958 (aged 82–83); Palmerston North, New Zealand

Umpiring information
- Tests umpired: 1 (1932)
- Source: Cricinfo, 7 June 2019

Walter Patrick Page (1875 – 23 September 1958) was a New Zealand cricket umpire. He stood in one Test match, New Zealand vs. South Africa, in 1932.

== See also ==
- List of Test cricket umpires
- South African cricket team in New Zealand in 1931–32
