= Louis Duffus =

South African cricketer

Louis Duffus

Louis George Duffus (13 May 1904 in Melbourne, Australia – 24 July 1984 in Johannesburg, South Africa) was a South African cricketer who became the country's most respected writer on the game.

== Life and career ==
Duffus was educated in Johannesburg, where he gained a Bachelor of Commerce degree at Witwatersrand University by part-time study. He was a fine athlete and baseballer, as well as a cricketer. A right-handed batsman and occasional wicket-keeper, he played in five first-class matches for Transvaal between 1923/24 and 1934/35. He played in a trial match to select the South African tour of England in 1929, but was not chosen.

Duffus quit his junior accountancy position with the Victoria Falls and Transvaal Power Company in Johannesburg in 1929 to accompany the South African cricket team on their tour of England in the hope of earning enough money from freelance reporting to pay for the trip. He was so successful that by the time he returned to South Africa he was employed as a full-time sports journalist. Thereafter, until South Africa were barred from Test cricket some forty years later as a result of apartheid, he hardly missed a Test match in which they were involved. He covered more than one hundred in all. His Wisden obituary described him as "conscientious, generous and very fair, with a delightful manner and a nice turn of phrase".

During the 1935 South African tour of England he was summoned from the press box to field as a substitute against Glamorgan. He caught Dyson at slip, which helped in ensuring the tourists' victory in front of a large Swansea crowd. He was proud that Wisden mentioned this in its match report.

He served as a war correspondent in the Mediterranean for the duration of World War II. He compiled and edited Volume 3 of the official history of South African cricket, covering the years from 1927 to 1947. He also wrote on rugby union, tennis, golf and women's hockey, among other sports. He was the sports editor of the Johannesburg Star.

He was married in Winchester, England, in 1932. He achieved a degree of fame in the medical world in 1970 when, though a haemophiliac, he had a hip operation in Oxford.

== Bibliography ==
- Cricketers of the Veld, Sampson Low, Marston & Company, 1946
- Beyond the Laager, Hurst & Blackett, 1947 (on South Africans' experiences during the war)
- South African Cricket 1927–1947, Volume 3, The South African Cricket Association, 1948.
- Springbok Glory, Longmans, 1955
- Champagne Cricket (on the Australian tour of South Africa, 1966–67)
- When Springboks Leap the Net: The Dramatic History of South Africa in Davis Cup Tennis, privately published, 1968
- Play Abandoned: An Autobiography, Timmins, 1969, ISBN 0-561-00077-8
