= W. B. Ryan =

South African cricket umpire

Umpiring information
- Tests umpired: 2 (1930–1931)
- Source: Cricinfo, 15 July 2013

W. B. Ryan was a South African cricket umpire. He stood in two Test matches between 1930 and 1931, both during England's tour of South Africa.

== See also ==
- List of Test cricket umpires
