= John Cochran (cricketer) =

South African cricketer

Cricket information
- Batting: Right-handed
- Bowling: Right-arm medium-fast

International information
- National side: South Africa
- Only Test: 21 February 1931 v England

Career statistics
Competition	Test	First-class
Matches	1	6
Runs scored	4	25
Batting average	4.00	4.16
100s/50s	0/0	0/0
Top score	4	13
Balls bowled	138	906
Wickets	0	15
Bowling average	–	24.06
5 wickets in innings	–	0
10 wickets in match	–	0
Best bowling	–	3/34
Catches/stumpings	0/–	2/–
- Source: Cricinfo, 14 November 2022

John Alexander Kennedy Cochran (15 July 1909 – 15 June 1987) was a South African cricketer who played in one Test match in 1931.

Cochran was a right-arm medium-fast bowler and a tail-end right-handed batsman. Having played only four previous first-class matches and never having taken more than three wickets in an innings, he was picked for South Africa for the fifth and final Test of the 1930–31 England tour at Durban, where South Africa needed only to draw to seal the series victory. Cochran took no wickets, but the draw was achieved. He played only one further first-class match.
