= John Forrester (umpire) =

New Zealand cricket umpire (1887–1946)

Personal information
- Full name: John Laurie Forrester
- Born: 13 July 1887
- Died: 12 February 1946 (aged 58)
- Role: Umpire

Umpiring information
- Tests umpired: 2 (1932–1933)
- Source: Cricinfo, 7 June 2019

John Forrester (13 July 1887 – 12 February 1946) was a New Zealand cricket umpire. He stood in two Test matches between 1932 and 1933.

== See also ==
- List of Test cricket umpires
- South African cricket team in New Zealand in 1931–32
- English cricket team in New Zealand in 1932–33
