= South African cricket team in England in 1935 =

International cricket tour

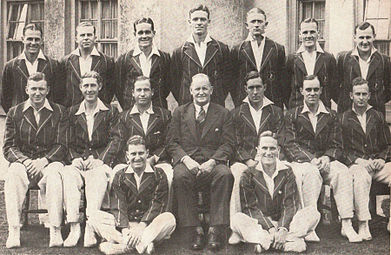
The team

The South African cricket team toured England in the 1935 season to play a five-match Test series against England.

South Africa won the series 1–0 with 4 matches drawn. Their victory at Lord's was their first in a Test in England, and with the remaining matches drawn, it also ensured that they would, for the first time, win a series in England. In all first-class matches, they won 17, drew 12, and lost only two.

== Test series summary ==
=== First Test ===
15–18 June 1935 (3-day match)
Scorecard

England	v	South Africa
384/7d (132 overs); RES Wyatt 149; CL Vincent 3/101 (43 overs)		220 (116.5 overs); IJ Siedle 59; MS Nichols 6/35 (23.5 overs)
		17/1 (f/o) (9 overs); B Mitchell 8* MS Nichols 1/14 (5 overs)

Match drawn
Trent Bridge, Nottingham
Umpires: A Dolphin and J Hardstaff

- England won the toss and elected to bat.
- 16 June was taken as a rest day.
- There was no play on the final day.
- NS Mitchell-Innes (ENG), and EAB Rowan, AD Nourse, HF Wade, DS Tomlinson, ACB Langton and RJ Crisp (all SA) made their Test debuts.

=== Second Test ===
29 June–2 July 1935 (3-day match)
Scorecard

South Africa	v	England
228 (91.3 overs); HB Cameron 90; H Verity 3/61 (28 overs)		198 (80.3 overs); RES Wyatt 53; XC Balaskas 5/49 (32 overs)
278/7d (121.4 overs); B Mitchell 164*; H Verity 3/56 (38 overs)		151 (67 overs); H Sutcliffe 38; ACB Langton 4/31 (11 overs)

South Africa won by 157 runs
Lord's, London
Umpires: EJ Smith and FI Walden

- South Africa won the toss and elected to bat.
- 30 June was taken as a rest day.

=== Third Test ===
13–16 July 1935 (3-day match)
Scorecard

England	v	South Africa
216 (93.5 overs); WR Hammond 63; CL Vincent 4/45 (32 overs)		171 (87.4 overs); EAB Rowan 62; MS Nichols 3/58 (21.4 overs)
294/7d (79.3 overs); WR Hammond 87*; CL Vincent 4/104 (23.3 overs)		194/5 (95.2 overs); B Mitchell 58; WE Bowes 2/31 (19 overs)

Match drawn
Headingley, Leeds
Umpires: F Chester and JW Hitch

- England won the toss and elected to bat.
- 14 July was taken as a rest day.
- D Smith, W Barber, J Hardstaff and JM Sims (all ENG) made their Test debuts.

=== Fourth Test ===
27–30 July 1935 (3-day match)
Scorecard

England	v	South Africa
357 (92.1 overs); RWV Robins 108; RJ Crisp 5/99 (26.1 overs)		318 (109.3 overs); KG Viljoen 124; WE Bowes 5/100 (36 overs)
231/6d (67 overs); WR Hammond 63*; CL Vincent 4/78 (26 overs)		169/2 (83 overs); AD Nourse 53*; RWV Robins 2/31 (19 overs)

Match drawn
Old Trafford, Manchester
Umpires: F Chester and FI Walden

- England won the toss and elected to bat.
- 28 July was taken as a rest day.

=== Fifth Test ===
17–20 August 1935 (3-day match)
Scorecard

South Africa	v	England
476 (145.4 overs); B Mitchell 128; HD Read 4/136 (35 overs)		534/6d (132 overs); M Leyland 161; ACB Langton 2/124 (38 overs)
287/6 (73 overs); EL Dalton 57*; WE Bowes 2/40 (13 overs)

Match drawn
The Oval, London
Umpires: F Chester and J Hardstaff

- England won the toss and elected to field.
- 18 August was taken as a rest day.
- JC Clay and HD Read (both ENG) made their Test debuts.

== Annual reviews ==
- Wisden Cricketers' Almanack 1936
