= Neville Quinn =

South African cricketer (1908–1934)

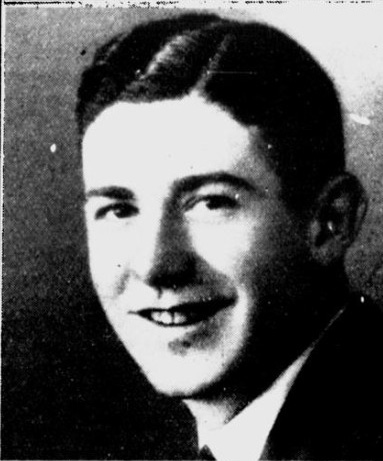
- Quinn in 1931

Personal information
- Born: 21 February 1908; Tweefontein, South Africa
- Died: 5 August 1934 (aged 26); Kenilworth, Kimberley, Northern Cape, South Africa
- Batting: Left-handed
- Bowling: Left-arm medium-fast

International information
- National side: South Africa (1929–1932)
- Test debut (cap 127): 15 June 1929 v England
- Last Test: 4 March 1932 v New Zealand

Career statistics
Competition	Tests	First-class
Matches	12	51
Runs scored	90	438
Batting average	6.00	9.12
100s/50s	0/0	0/0
Top score	28	32
Balls bowled	2,922	11,055
Wickets	35	186
Bowling average	32.71	20.78
5 wickets in innings	1	12
10 wickets in match	0	3
Best bowling	6/92	8/37
Catches/stumpings	1/–	10/–
- Source: Cricinfo, 7 August 2019

Neville Anthony Quinn (21 February 1908 – 5 August 1934) was a cricketer who played in 12 Test matches for South Africa from 1929 to 1931–32.

== Early cricket career ==
A left-handed lower-order batsman and a left-arm medium fast bowler, Quinn played first-class cricket for Griqualand West from the 1927–28 season. The following season, in only his third first-class game, he took eight Border first-innings wickets for 37 runs, and this remained his best innings bowling performance. He followed that with six for 19 in 24 overs against Transvaal in the next match, and that secured his place on the 1929 South African tour to England.

== Tour to England ==
He made his Test debut on the tour to England in 1929. He found the bowling conditions of a dry English summer suited his swing bowling, and played in four of the five Tests. He took 6–92 in England's first innings in the Third Test at Headingley, the only 5-wicket haul in his short Test career, and came second in the tourists' bowling averages behind Tuppy Owen-Smith.

Quinn played in one Test of the series at home against England in 1930–31, the drawn Third Test at Durban which was dominated by the English bowlers, and then toured to Australia and New Zealand in 1931–32, also finishing second in the tourists' bowling averages, this time behind Sandy Bell. He dismissed Donald Bradman for only 2 in the Third Test in Melbourne, the only time Bradman was out for less than 100 in that series. Bradman wrote later: "In the First Test, Neville Quinn ... had me sorely puzzled, and I was missed off him twice in my innings, then went on to make 226 ... Quinn worried me more than any of their bowlers, and appeared to come off the pitch faster than any medium fast bowler I have met in this country with the possible exception of Maurice Tate."

The matches on the Australasian tour proved to be his last Test cricket. He died suddenly at the age of 26 of heart failure. He had been a habitual sleepwalker.

His older brother Michael played first-class cricket for Rhodesia in 1931–32.
