= Albert King (umpire) =

South African cricket umpire (1878–1946)

Personal information
- Full name: Albert Charles King
- Born: 24 December 1878; Durban, Natal Colony
- Died: 28 October 1946 (aged 67); Durban, South Africa

Umpiring information
- Tests umpired: 3 (1931)
- Source: Cricinfo, 9 July 2013

Albert Charles King (24 December 1878 – 28 October 1946) was a South African cricketer and cricket umpire. He stood in three Test matches in 1931.

Born at Durban in 1878, King played three first-class matches for Natal during the 1906–07 season. He scored a total of 85 runs, with a highest score of 62 not out made against Eastern Province in his second match, an innings that ended when King was forced to retire hurt. He also took seven wickets, all of them in a single innings on debut against Griqualand West. In the match, Griqualand West were dismissed for 64 in their first innings and 31 in their second, with King taking seven wickets for ten runs in the second from just 38 balls. At the time these were the best innings bowling figures for Natal in first-class cricket.

King died at Durban in 1946. He was aged 67.

== See also ==
- List of Test cricket umpires
