= Arthur Edward Ochse =

South African cricketer (1870–1918)

Arthur Ochse
- Ochse in 1891

Personal information
- Full name: Arthur Edward Ochse
- Born: 11 March 1870; Graaff-Reinet, Cape Colony, South Africa
- Died: 11 April 1918 (aged 48); Messines Ridge, West Flanders, Belgium
- Nickname: Okey
- Batting: Right-handed

International information
- National side: South Africa
- Test debut (cap 6): 12 March 1889 v England
- Last Test: 25 March 1889 v England

Career statistics
Competition	Tests	First-class
Matches	2	5
Runs scored	16	231
Batting average	4.00	23.10
100s/50s	0/0	0/1
Top score	8	99
Balls bowled	0	145
Wickets	0	2
Bowling average	–	37.50
5 wickets in innings	0	0
10 wickets in match	0	0
Best bowling	–	2/27
Catches/stumpings	0/0	1/0
- Source: ESPNcricinfo

Arthur Edward "Okey" Ochse (11 March 1870 – 11 April 1918) was a South African cricketer who played Test cricket in the first matches played by South Africa in 1888–89. He died in action in World War I.

== Life and career ==
Ochse was born at Graaff-Reinet in the Cape Colony and educated at Diocesan College, Rondebosch.

A middle-order batsman, Ochse, like the rest of the South African team, made his first-class debut in his country's first Test match, which was played against England at Port Elizabeth. At 19 years and 1 day old, he was South Africa's youngest Test debutant (a record since surpassed) and he retained his place for the second Test played two weeks later. But like so many of his teammates, his inexperience against such good opposition showed. In four innings against Major Warton's English team, Ochse scored just 16 runs as England ran out comprehensive winners in South Africa's first two representative matches played on level terms. During the second innings of the second Test, played at Cape Town, Ochse was bowled by England's slow left arm spinner, Johnny Briggs, one of Briggs' eight victims in a then Test record of eight wickets for 11 runs in an innings (and 15 for 28 in a match).

Domestically, Ochse played first-class cricket for Transvaal, once in 1891 and twice more in 1895. In the match against Kimberley at Johannesburg in the Currie Cup season of 1890/91, he was unlucky to miss out on a maiden century when, in the second innings, he fell one run short. He also scored 45 in Transvaal's first innings and took two wickets in the match.

Ochse worked as a lawyer. After World War I broke out, he joined the South African Infantry in early 1915. He served in South-West Africa, Egypt and France, and was wounded at least twice. He was killed in action at Messines Ridge on the Western Front during Germany's 1918 Spring Offensive. He was unmarried.

== See also ==
- Arthur Lennox Ochse

== Sources ==
- World Cricketers – A Biographical Dictionary by Christopher Martin-Jenkins published by Oxford University Press (1996)
