= Tuppy Owen-Smith =

England international rugby union player & S.African cricketer

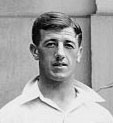

Personal information
- Full name: Harold Geoffrey Owen Owen-Smith
- Born: 18 February 1909; Rondebosch, Cape Town, South Africa
- Died: 28 February 1990 (aged 81); Rosebank, Cape Province, South Africa
- Batting: Right-handed
- Bowling: Legbreak

International information
- National side: South Africa
- Test debut (cap 126): 15 June 1929 v England
- Last Test: 17 August 1929 v England

Domestic team information
- Years: Team
- 1927/28–1949/50: Western Province
- 1931–1933: Oxford University
- 1935–1937: Middlesex

Career statistics
Competition	Test	First-class
Matches	5	101
Runs scored	252	4,059
Batting average	42.00	26.88
100s/50s	1/1	3/23
Top score	129	168*
Balls bowled	156	13,445
Wickets	0	319
Bowling average	–	23.22
5 wickets in innings	–	20
10 wickets in match	–	3
Best bowling	–	7/153
Catches/stumpings	4/–	92/–
- Source: Cricinfo, 7 August 2019

Harold Geoffrey Owen Owen-Smith (18 February 1909 – 28 February 1990), known as Tuppy Smith, was a South African cricketer who played Test cricket for South Africa and a rugby player who played for and captained the England rugby union team. He was born in Rondebosch, Cape Town, and died at Rosebank, also in Cape Town.

== Early life ==
Owen-Smith was educated at Diocesan College in Rondebosch and attended the University of Cape Town. An all-round athlete, he represented his school and university in cricket and rugby amongst other sports.

== Career ==
Owen-Smith played cricket in 5 Tests in 1929 for South Africa, all during the tour of England, and was named Wisden Cricketer of the Year in 1930.

He was capped 10 times in rugby union by England from 1934 to 1937. He was captain throughout the 1937 Home Nations Championship, so he captained England three times. He is regarded as having been a fine attacking full-back and a great of the game. He also gained awards in boxing and athletics whilst at university in England. He played one match for Leicester Tigers against Waterloo F.C. in 1933.

== Medical career ==
Owen-Smith studied medicine at Magdalen College, Oxford, on a Rhodes Scholarship and qualified as a physician at St Mary's Hospital Medical School. While at Oxford, he continued playing rugby and cricket for his university. After completing his degree he went back to South Africa and was a long-serving and much loved general practitioner, largely working from his home in Rondebosch.

== Family ==
His son, Michael Owen-Smith, is a South African journalist who served as the media manager for Cricket South Africa from 2007 to 2010.
