= Maurice Leyland =

English cricketer (1900–1967)

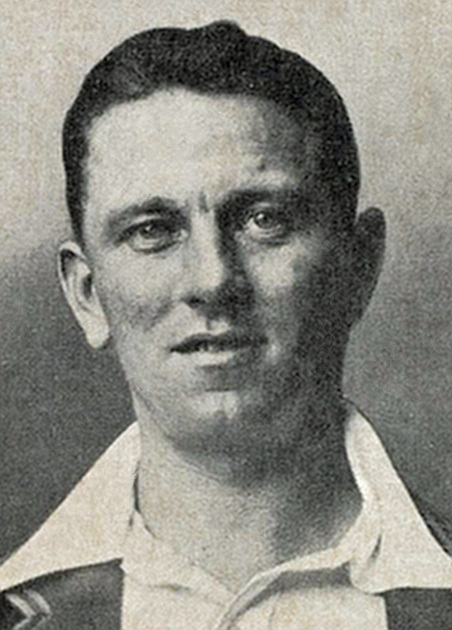
- Leyland in 1932

Personal information
- Full name: Maurice Leyland
- Born: 20 July 1900; Harrogate, Yorkshire, England
- Died: 1 January 1967 (aged 66); Scotton, Knaresborough, Yorkshire, England
- Batting: Left-handed
- Bowling: Slow left-arm orthodox

International information
- National side: England
- Test debut: 11 August 1928 v West Indies
- Last Test: 20 August 1938 v Australia

Domestic team information
- Years: Team
- 1920–1946: Yorkshire

Career statistics
Competition	Test	First-class
Matches	41	686
Runs scored	2,764	33,660
Batting average	46.06	40.50
100s/50s	9/10	80/154
Top score	187	263
Balls bowled	1,103	28,971
Wickets	6	466
Bowling average	97.50	29.31
5 wickets in innings	0	11
10 wickets in match	0	1
Best bowling	3/91	8/63
Catches/stumpings	13/–	246/–
- Source: ESPNcricinfo, 31 October 2013

Maurice Leyland (20 July 1900 – 1 January 1967) was an English international cricketer who played 41 Test matches between 1928 and 1938. In first-class cricket, he represented Yorkshire County Cricket Club between 1920 and 1946, scoring over 1,000 runs in 17 consecutive seasons. A left-handed middle-order batsman and occasional left-arm spinner, Leyland was a Wisden Cricketer of the Year in 1929.

Born in Harrogate, Leyland came from a cricketing family. After playing locally, he made his Yorkshire debut in 1920, and appeared intermittently in the following two seasons. Although not statistically successful, he impressed judges at the club, and was a regular member of the team from 1923. He steadily improved over the following seasons to reach the fringes of the England team and made his Test debut in 1928 against the West Indies. That winter, he toured Australia – a controversial decision as he replaced the famous batsman Frank Woolley – and scored a century in his only Test of the series. He remained in the side until 1930, but a loss of form in the next two seasons called his place into question. He recovered by scoring 1,000 runs in August 1932 to secure his inclusion in the team to tour Australia in 1932–33.

During that series, Leyland scored runs several times under pressure and by the time Australia toured England in 1934, he was a leading batsman in the team. He held his place until 1938 when he was replaced in the team by younger batsmen for the series against Australia. Recalled for the final match, he scored 187, his highest Test score in what became his last match. After military service in the Second World War, Leyland returned to the Yorkshire team for one season before announcing his retirement from regular first-class cricket. He maintained his connection with Yorkshire, and served as the county coach between 1950 and 1963. He died in 1967.

Although he was neither aesthetically nor technically among the best batsmen, Leyland had a reputation for batting well under pressure. He performed most effectively against the best teams and bowlers, and in difficult situations; his Test batting record is better than his first-class figures, and against Australia his average is even higher. Outside of Tests, he had some success with the ball, and had it not been for the depth of spin bowling in Yorkshire, he might have been a leading bowler. He was one of the first to bowl left-arm wrist-spin, and may have invented the name to describe such deliveries: "chinamen". Very popular with team-mates and spectators, Leyland had a reputation as a humorist, and many stories were told about him.

== Early life and career ==
Leyland was born on 20 July 1900 in Bilton, an area of Harrogate, to Mercy (née Lambert) and Edward (Ted) Leyland. He was registered at birth as Morris Leyland but his name was usually spelt "Maurice". His father was a stonemason and a well-respected professional cricketer for Moorside in Lancashire. Leyland senior also acted as Moorside's groundsman, and in later years continued that role at Harrogate, Headingley Cricket Ground and Edgbaston. Leyland junior joined his father in the Moorside team in 1912, and by the age of fourteen had graduated to the Lancashire League. After army service in the First World War, he became a professional cricketer for Harrogate between 1918 and 1920. From there he made appearances for the Yorkshire Council, and Yorkshire's second team, for whom he bowled regularly; when he reached the first team, he bowled infrequently in his first seasons. Around this time, he also played football for Harrogate.

During the early 1920s, the Yorkshire committee was attempting to find players to replace those whose careers had ended with the First World War. Late in the 1920 season, Leyland made his first-class debut for Yorkshire, having played several times in the second team that summer. He played once, against Essex, scoring ten runs in his only innings, but this was his sole appearance that year. He had never previously attended a County Championship game. The following year, Leyland played in five first-team matches, scoring 52 not out against Leicestershire, averaging just over 19 for the season. In the latter part of the 1922 season he played more regularly, replacing Norman Kilner in the team. Although Leyland's batting figures were unimpressive, the summary of Yorkshire's season in Wisden Cricketers' Almanack said he "gave signs of promise as a forcing batsman and fielded very finely". His highest score in 14 matches was 29, but he was awarded his county cap, and critics within Yorkshire judged him to have great potential.

== Established county cricketer ==
Leyland played regularly in the 1923 season and reached 1,000 runs in first-class cricket, a total he exceeded in each of the seventeen seasons between 1923 and the outbreak of war in 1939. In 1923, he scored seven fifties and averaged 27.89; Wisden suggested that he would become a leading left-handed batsman and that "his future seems assured". In his history of Yorkshire County Cricket Club, Anthony Woodhouse states that Leyland gained valuable experience as part of a successful batting side. (Note: Leyland was one of six batsmen in the team to pass 1,000 first-class runs. The others were Percy Holmes, Herbert Sutcliffe, Roy Kilner, Wilfred Rhodes and Edgar Oldroyd.) During this period, Yorkshire won the County Championship in four successive seasons from 1922 to 1925. A later review of Leyland's career in Wisden suggested that this team was one of Yorkshire's strongest, but sometimes became over-competitive and aggressive. The review stated that this environment "was a hard school for a young cricketer, but Leyland thrived on such discipline, and he has never lost his laugh."

By the beginning of the 1924 season, Leyland was recognised in The Times as one of the most promising young professional batsmen in England; the newspaper's cricket correspondent said that Leyland "is fully expected, in Yorkshire, to develop into a first-rate left-handed batsman." He continued to improve that season, scoring 1,259 runs at 30.70. In August, he scored his first century in first-class cricket, hitting 133 not out in a drawn game against Lancashire; later in the month, he scored another century. Leyland further improved his record in 1925, hitting 1,572 runs at 40.30. Wisden commented: "Leyland still further increased the big reputation he had made in the previous summer and ought, if all goes well with him, to attain the highest distinction." By the end of the 1926 season, in which he scored 1,561 runs at 39.02 and hit five centuries, Leyland had established himself as one of the most reliable batsmen in the Yorkshire team.

Following the example of Wilfred Rhodes, several Yorkshire cricketers in the 1920s spent English winters coaching in India for the Maharaja of Patiala. Leyland coached in the winter of 1926–27, along with Arthur Dolphin, the Yorkshire wicketkeeper. That same winter, a Marylebone Cricket Club (MCC) team toured India; although not chosen in the touring party, both Leyland and Dolphin played a handful of matches for the MCC. During the 1927 season Leyland scored 1,625 runs at 41.66, and, against Middlesex, scored his first double-century. Wisden suggested that he "was not so dependable as could have been desired", but batted in an entertaining fashion. In August, he was selected in a trial game to assess players who might represent England in Test matches (playing against the England team for a side named "The Rest") and scored 102. In the winter of 1927–28, Leyland once more coached in India for the Maharajah of Patiala.

Shortly after returning from India, Leyland married Constance (Connie) Russell in Harrogate on 29 March 1928. In later years, Connie looked after the children of Herbert Sutcliffe during Yorkshire matches at Harrogate when their behaviour became too much for their own mother. Sutcliffe's daughter later recalled Connie as "very stern and cross", and the only person who could control her and her brother: "I was frightened to death."

== Test match cricketer ==
=== Test debut and selection for Australian tour ===
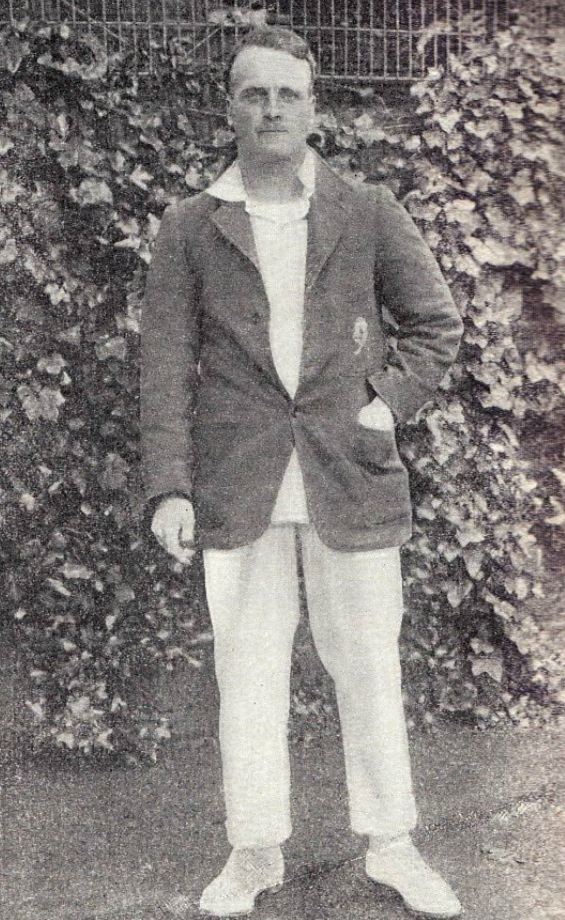
The death of Roy Kilner left the Yorkshire attack weakened and led to Leyland's bowling more frequently.

Like Leyland, the Yorkshire bowler Roy Kilner coached in India during 1927–28. However, in doing so Kilner contracted a fever and died shortly after returning to England. With a weakened bowling attack, and affected by injuries and loss of form, Yorkshire pressed Leyland into service as an occasional bowler in the 1928 season. He had done little bowling for Yorkshire at this point; the team possessed two slow left-arm spinners in Kilner and Rhodes, leaving Leyland with little opportunity. Having never bowled 50 first-class overs in a previous season, nor taken more than four wickets, he bowled more than 500 overs in 1928 and took 35 wickets at an average of 34.20. At this stage, the Yorkshire authorities thought that he might fully take on Kilner's bowling workload, or succeed Rhodes in the senior spinner's position. Leyland also had his most effective season with the bat. He scored 1,783 runs at an average of 54.03, and scored another double century. At the end of the season, Wisden commented: "[Leyland] can play both the games – the dogged defence when a bad position must be saved and a fine forcing game when it is necessary to make runs quickly. In the ordinary way his preference is for attack and he is a delightful batsman to watch."

During June 1928, Leyland was selected for another Test trial, playing for "The Rest" against England; then in mid-July he played for the Players against the Gentlemen at Lord's Cricket Ground. At the end of July, the MCC named the team to tour Australia for the 1928–29 Ashes series. (Note: Throughout Leyland's career, the MCC organised and administered English cricket. Official English touring teams always played under the name of MCC and were styled "England" only during Test matches.) Leyland was included in the team; according to The Times, it would have been difficult to leave him out and his presence lifted the fielding ability of the side. His selection was controversial in the south of England, and particularly in Kent, as he took the place that the veteran Kent batsman Frank Woolley was expected to fill. One Kent supporter wrote that Leyland was a "cross bat village-greener". Pelham Warner, a selector at the time, claimed that Leyland's superior fielding influenced the decision, but the cricket writer Alan Gibson suggests that the real choice was between Woolley and Phil Mead, two batsmen of similar age. In 1928, the West Indies toured England, playing their first Test matches. The team did not perform well, but the England selectors picked strong teams to provide practice for the players. Leyland was selected for the last of the three Test matches. Making his debut on 11 August 1928, he was dismissed for 0 by Herman Griffith in his only innings.

The MCC team which toured Australia was extremely strong in batting, and Leyland served as back-up to the main batsmen. The English batting line-up was settled for most of the series, leaving little opportunity for the reserves; although Mead played in the first Test, he was subsequently left out to strengthen the bowling. Playing in other first-class matches on the tour, Leyland scored centuries against South Australia and Queensland. With England 4–0 ahead in the series, Chapman stood down from the final Test; although it is not clear why he did so, one possibility is that he wished to give as many members of the team as possible a chance to appear in the Tests. Alternatively, he may have felt that his batting form did not warrant a place in the team. Whatever the reason, Leyland took his place. England lost the match, but Leyland was successful. He scored 137, his first Test century, and 53 not out. The report in Wisden said that he "distinguished himself by two really delightful displays ... His exhibition of powerful, well-timed driving past cover-point will long be remembered by those who saw it." Overall, in first-class matches on the tour, he scored 614 runs at 43.85, but his bowling was ineffective on the hard pitches. Following his success in the last Test, Leyland was expected to become one of the leading English batsmen, and before the 1929 season he was named one of the Wisden Cricketers of the Year for his performances in the 1928 season.

=== Test regular ===
Leyland scored 1,931 runs at 42.91 in 1929, and took 50 first-class wickets in the season at an average of 30.26. In the match against Oxford University he took eight wickets and against Glamorgan he took five wickets in an innings for the first time in his career. Against Lancashire, in a match which Rhodes missed with injury, Leyland took the role of the main spinner and returned figures of seven wickets for 52 runs. After watching this performance, the cricket writer Neville Cardus judged that Leyland had bowled well and with spirit on a wet pitch which favoured spin bowling, but that he lacked the accuracy and flight required in left-arm spin bowlers and exemplified by Rhodes. In another game, Cardus observed that Leyland seemed to be attempting left-handed googly bowling. Following success in a trial game, Leyland kept his place in the Test team, playing all five matches against South Africa that summer to score 294 runs at an average of 42.00. In the Second Test, played at Lord's, he scored 73 and 102.

Leyland did not play in the first two matches of the 1930 Ashes series; Woolley replaced him in the team but was unsuccessful and Leyland came in for the final three games. Leyland was little more effective, and his highest score in the series was 44; England lost 2–1. More successful for Yorkshire, he scored five centuries for the county, and hit his highest score of the season against Lancashire, the eventual County Champions for 1930. At the time, Yorkshire v Lancashire matches were mainly dour, slow-scoring affairs, but Leyland played freely to score 211 not out in around 270 minutes. He hit two sixes in one over, and, according to Cardus, played "great and beautiful cricket". Leyland's best bowling performance that year came for the Players against the Gentlemen at Lord's, when he took seven for 94 in the first innings and nine wickets in the match. In all first-class matches in 1930, he scored 2,175 runs at an average of 50.58, the first time he reached 2,000 runs in a season, and took 53 wickets at 27.92. During the 1930–31 English winter, he toured South Africa with an MCC team. Owing to the absence of a regular opening batsman, Leyland opened the batting on several occasions and performed consistently during the tour. In first-class matches, he scored 774 runs at 36.85 and took nine wickets; in the Test series, he scored 300 runs at 42.85, twice passing fifty. In the second game, he took three for 91, his best bowling performance in Test matches.

=== Bodyline tour ===
Leyland struggled in the following two seasons. In 1931 he scored just one century as his aggregate and average (1,228 runs at 38.37) both fell, although his increasing habit of succeeding against the best opposition continued when he scored 96 for Yorkshire against the Rest of England. With the ball, he took 12 wickets at an average over 40. Despite his loss of form, Yorkshire won the County Championship for the first time since 1925; the team were also champions in the next two seasons and went on to win seven out of nine championships before the Second World War. Leyland played for the Players against the Gentlemen, but was not selected for any of the Tests in the three-match series between England and New Zealand. Wisden later suggested that he was "stale"; at the time, in reviewing candidates to tour Australia in 1932–33, the Wisden editor believed that "no reason exists why Leyland should not regain his best form".

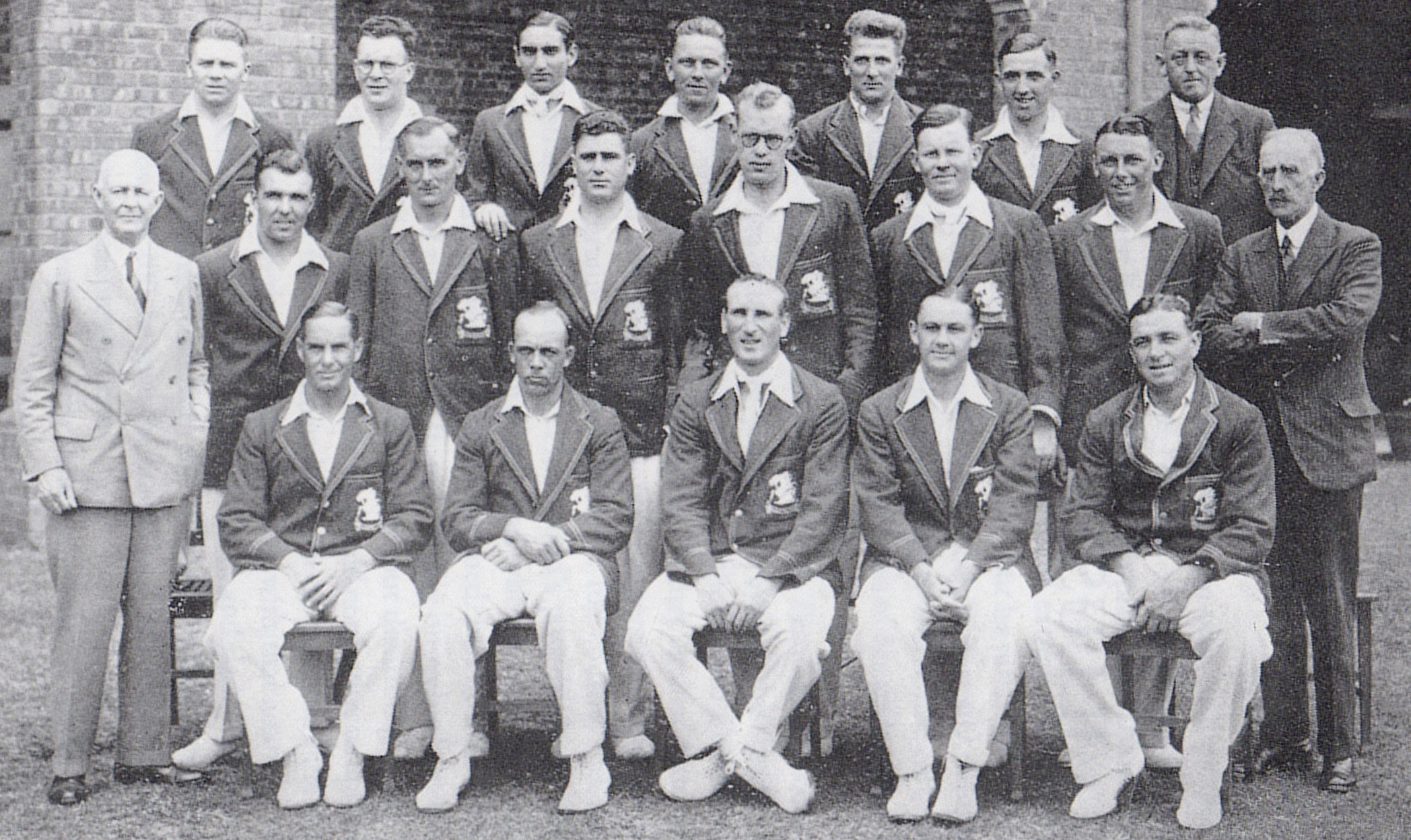
A team photograph of England's 1932–33 side: Leyland is in the middle of the back row.

At the beginning of the 1932 season, Leyland continued to struggle. Although he was chosen in two Test trial matches and scored 189 against Middlesex, he was left out of the England team for the only Test of the summer, and had little success in the first three months of the season. However, in August he made 1,013 runs at 84.14, scoring four centuries and two innings over 90. During this spell, Leyland shared a partnership of 149 runs in 55 minutes with Herbert Sutcliffe against Essex. That county had chosen two fast bowlers in an attempt to intimidate the Yorkshire batsmen. Ken Farnes and Morris Nichols bowled a succession of bouncers; Farnes attempted fast leg theory bowling, a tactic which developed into Bodyline during the MCC tour of Australia in 1932–33. Eventually, Sutcliffe began to hook the short ball and in six successive overs, he and Leyland added 102 runs, an unusually fast rate of scoring. Leyland faced little of the bowling, later remembering that he received only four deliveries in this period, hitting each for four. In total, he contributed only 45 runs to the partnership. Farnes was reduced to tears by the assault on his bowling, and these events possibly persuaded the MCC selectors to leave him out of the team for the 1932–33 tour. Leyland, on the other hand, was among the last names added to the touring party in mid-August. At the end of the season, he scored 105 against the Rest of England for Yorkshire, his team playing as County Champions. In total, he scored 1,980 runs at 52.10 and took 23 wickets at 20.86.

England won the 1932–33 Ashes series 4–1, but the cricket was overshadowed by controversy over the team's use of Bodyline tactics. Leyland was not particularly successful in statistical terms. However, assessing the tour in Wisden, Sydney Southerton wrote that Leyland "fared on the whole extremely well ... he had batted finely in the Test matches at Adelaide and Brisbane". He scored 306 runs in the five Test matches at an average of 34.00; he began and ended the series with scores of 0, but played innings of 83 and 86 in the decisive third and fourth Test matches, with his team under pressure when he batted. Gibson points out that both his ducks came when England were in dominant positions. In all first-class matches on the tour, Leyland scored 880 runs at 44.00, including two centuries against state teams. The former Australian batsmen Charlie Macartney suggested that, although "a useful player", Leyland was hindered by his defensive approach. Going against his naturally aggressive approach made him seem "awkward", and never allowed him to play at his best. Other Australian commentators had a more favourable opinion.

=== Peak years ===
Returning from Australia, Leyland scored 2,317 first-class runs in the 1933 season, the highest seasonal aggregate of his career. Averaging 50.36, he scored seven centuries. With the ball, he took 37 wickets at 28.13. In a game against Leicestershire in August, he took ten wickets for 94 runs, the only time in his career he took ten wickets in a match. The West Indies team toured England that season, but Leyland played only in the first Test; he scored one run in his single innings. Leyland also scored over 2,000 first-class runs in 1934, at an average of 53.55. Playing all five Test matches of the series against the touring Australian team, he scored 478 runs at an average of 68.28. His three centuries were scored when England were in difficult situations. A Wisden review of his career written in 1943 stated: "In 1934 Leyland reached the height of his powers. Ripe in technique, rich in experience, like granite in battle, he was in this season England's greatest batsman."

England lost the series 2–1. The Australians were heavily dependent on the bowling of Clarrie Grimmett and Bill O'Reilly. At the time, O'Reilly was regarded as the best bowler in the world, and among the greatest of all time, but Leyland began a spell of relative dominance over him. In the second Test, Leyland scored 109 and shared a partnership of 129 with Les Ames; in the next match, he hit 153 runs, sharing large partnerships with Patsy Hendren and Ames, and in the final Test, he played an innings of 110. However, the rest of the England batting was unreliable; reviewing the season, the Wisden editor Sydney Southerton wrote: "In nearly every match either Hendren, Leyland or Ames, instead of being able to go in and play a free, confident game, had to save or remedy a position seriously damaged by the quick fall of two or three wickets." In addition to his batting successes, Leyland was generally the best outfielder in the England team. He also scored three centuries for Yorkshire, another for the Rest of England against Lancashire, the Champion County, and 80 for the Players against the Gentlemen at Lord's. With the ball, he took 33 first-class wickets. He was given a benefit match against Nottinghamshire; his benefit eventually raised £3,648, at the time the third highest amount raised for a Yorkshire player. (Note: The only higher amounts for Yorkshire were £3,703 raised for George Hirst in 1904 and £4106 for Roy Kilner in 1925. Only Herbert Sutcliffe also received over £3,000 before the Second World War.)

During the winter of 1934–35, Leyland toured the West Indies with an MCC team which lost the four-Test series 2–1. The English batsmen were overwhelmed by the pace bowlers of the West Indies team, and some MCC players complained that Learie Constantine, Manny Martindale and Leslie Hylton intimidated the visiting batsmen with short-pitched bowling. Leyland played three Tests but scored only 36 runs in six innings. More successful in other first-class games, he scored 347 runs at 21.68 overall, and took 11 wickets. He scored 1,815 runs at an average of 38.61 in 1935 and took 32 wickets at 25.46. He played in four of the five Tests against South Africa, missing the third with lumbago, to score 342 runs at 57.00. In the first and fourth Tests, he hit fifties, and in the final match scored 161 runs in 130 minutes, batting quickly throughout. However, England could not force a win, and having lost the second Test, were beaten 1–0 in the series.

After taking part in a tour of Jamaica by the Yorkshire team, on which he scored 115 and 75 in successive games, Leyland scored 1,790 runs at 45.89 in 1936. He hit seven centuries, including an innings of 263 runs against Essex in the season, the highest first-class score of his career. He played in two of the three Tests against India that season (he missed the second with injury) but only batted twice. In the first Test, he scored 60 runs against a strong bowling attack when England were in a difficult position. The home side won the series 2–0. During the season, Leyland was among the first players chosen to tour Australia with the MCC in the forthcoming winter.

The MCC team was captained by G. O. B. Allen who added Leyland to the team selection committee during the tour. The team won the first two Tests, but lost the next three to lose the series 3–2, and Wisden blamed a weakness in batting for the defeat. Leyland was one of the few batsmen excused: "Leyland, though very restrained, was one of the mainstays of the batting". Before the series, England were expected to struggle severely against the bowling of O'Reilly. According to Cardus, Leyland told O'Reilly before the first Test: "Ah can tell thi one thing now for certain ... Ah's got thee where Ah wants thi, Bill – and Ah thinks tha knows it."

In the first Test, Leyland scored 126 after the team lost the first three wickets for 20 runs; many critics judged this to be his greatest innings. At this point, he had scored four centuries in seven Test innings against Australia. He played an effective defensive innings in the second innings, and another in the second Test, when he was criticised for slow scoring. Then in the third Test, on a pitch made exceptionally difficult for batsmen by rain, England could score only 76 for nine; Leyland scored 17 of those runs and, according to Wisden, "was the one real success for England ... [He] never seemed in difficulties". In the second innings, he scored a century In total, in five Test matches, he scored 441 runs at an average of 55.12. Australian critics viewed Leyland as one of England's best batsmen, and gave him credit for England's strong showing early in the series. In all first-class games on the tour, he scored 902 runs at 50.11; he was unsuccessful in three games the team played in New Zealand on completion of the main tour.

=== Last years as a cricketer ===
Leyland missed a substantial amount of cricket in 1937 with a broken finger, barely playing in July, and missing the Test series against New Zealand. He scored 1,306 runs at 36.27 and took 19 wickets. Injuries continued to trouble him in 1938. He scored 1,884 first-class runs at 43.81, but a shoulder strain early in the season adversely affected his form. He was not selected for the first three Tests against Australia, not least as the England side contained several promising batsmen. However, he had his best season with the ball. A succession of hard, dry wickets gave fewer opportunities to orthodox spinners and Leyland took 63 wickets at 19.32. Early in the season, he took eight for 63 against Hampshire, the best figures of his career. Just as his batting form returned, and when he was likely to be recalled to the England side, Leyland broke his thumb in a match against Middlesex. However, he recovered in time to play in the final Test of the series. Australia's victory in the fourth Test had given the team a 1–0 lead.

Wisden commented: "The inclusion once again of Leyland was a move which yielded splendid results." Coming in to bat at number three, Leyland shared a partnership of 382 with Len Hutton, at the time a record English Test partnership for any wicket; it is still England's highest partnership for the second wicket, and the highest for any wicket against Australia. As there was no time limit on the match, Leyland batted very cautiously and scored 187 in around six-and-a-half hours before he was run out. Hutton went on to score 364, at the time the highest score in Tests. England had batted deliberately slowly to frustrate the bowlers, and Cardus expressed his frustration to Leyland during an interval in play. Cardus wrote: "'And even you, Maurice,' I complained, in sorrow not anger, 'even you won't hit the ball and give us some cricket.' 'Hey, wait a minute, Mr Cardus,' expostulated Leyland, as though pained at my protest, 'wait a minute – tha must remember that Ah'm playing for me place in team.'" England went on to win the match and level the series. Leyland's innings was his highest in Tests, but this was his final match for England. In 41 Tests, he scored 2,764 runs at 46.06 and took six wickets.

In 1939, the last season before the Second World War, Leyland scored 1,238 runs at 39.93 and took 23 wickets. He served in the army during the war: first as a sergeant instructor, and was later commissioned as lieutenant. Between his army duties, he played cricket in the Bradford League, and played for various wartime teams, including ones representing the army. In 1945, he played some non-first-class games for teams representing Yorkshire and a first-class game for Yorkshire against Lancashire. Choosing to continue his career after the war to help the Yorkshire team become re-established, Leyland played a last full season in 1946 when he scored 632 runs at 21.06, with a highest score of 88, and took 16 wickets at 14.70; against Warwickshire, he took seven for 36. During August 1946, he announced his retirement, but in the following two seasons, he appeared in some end-of-season first-class games. He ended his first-class career in 1948 with 33,660 runs at 40.50 and 466 wickets at 29.31.

== Later life ==
After his retirement from the Yorkshire team, Leyland returned to play for Harrogate until 1950, when he became chief coach, along with Arthur Mitchell, at Yorkshire. Mitchell was a dour, serious man but the contrast with the cheerier Leyland made an effective partnership. Leyland also served as a representative of the paper manufacturers Thomas Owen. In 1949, he was among the first group of former professional cricketers to be awarded honorary membership of the MCC. He continued as a respected coach of Yorkshire until illness forced his retirement in 1963. Suffering from Parkinson's disease, he maintained some connections with Yorkshire cricket and always tried to attend matches played at Harrogate. In recognition of his achievements, the Harrogate grounds erected new gates which were named in his honour. Leyland died in a hospital at Knaresborough on 1 January 1967.

== Style, technique and personality ==
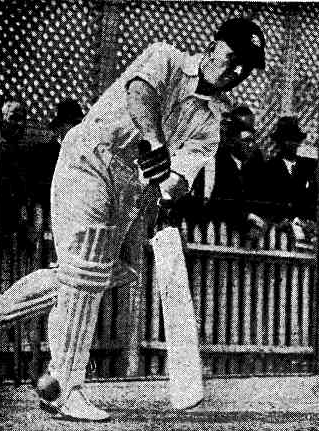
Leyland practising batting in 1936

As a batsman, Leyland generally batted in the middle order or occasionally opened. Early in his career, commentators suggested that his batting technique was faulty, even when he was statistically successful. His use of the cut shot was mistrusted by some Yorkshire critics, and they suspected that his preference for attacking play would be unsuccessful; he was a faster scorer and more aggressive batsman than most of his Yorkshire contemporaries. Cardus suggested that, instead, he was in the line of "humorous Yorkshiremen which the broad nature of his county produces from time to time as a contrast to and leavening of the generally dour lump. There was a twinkle in his eye and there was a twinkle in his bat, no matter how grimly and straight it may occasionally be obliged to defend a difficult situation in Yorkshire." The cricket writer E. W. Swanton observed that Leyland's bat was often not straight when he played his shots, contrary to orthodox technique, but the speed of his footwork and his ability to watch the ball closely made up for any lapses. Opposing bowlers suggested that the impression was an illusion and that his bat was straight when he hit the ball.

Although Leyland was not a stylish batsman, he was effective. Cardus described him as "a sturdy cricketer, not tall, but his sloping bottle-neck shoulders seemed to add inches to him and he had long arms of impressive thickness, veined with strength at the wrist; also he was broad in the beam, with a rubicund smile on his cheerful open countenance." He was a good driver of the ball, with a high backlift, and moved quickly and economically to reach the pitch of the ball. Cardus thought that his style of batting was representative of his character: "He put his nature into every stroke, and as soon as he had 'got bowling where he wanted it,' he didn't merely hit or drive it – he walloped it." At times, Leyland's desire to score quickly brought about his dismissal. However, when necessary, he defended strongly and used his pads as a second line of defence if he missed the ball with his bat.

Critics judged Leyland a better Test than county batsman. His first-class batting figures were not exceptional compared to other cricketers who played far fewer Test matches, but in Tests, his average is six runs an innings higher; against Australia, the strongest of England's opponents during his career, he averaged 56, a further increase of ten runs. Gibson suggests that he rose to the big occasions, and that he performed best against the toughest opponents. According to Leyland's obituary in The Times, "He was essentially a man for the big occasion, a batsman at his best in a crisis, and his favourite game was a Roses match or an Australian Test. England's supporters often breathed a sigh of relief to see his burly figure purposefully striding to the wicket." The writer R. C. Robertson-Glasgow suggested that Leyland in a Test match was like the "four-squarers of ancient or romantic times. He was Horatius on the tottering bridge; Hector, who alone stood between Troy and destruction. He was born to rescue. But he is more dangerous than those who are stubborn or grim. He has something of D'Artagnan in him; there is a gaiety besides the simplicity and strength; seen in the slight list of the cap, and in a certain jauntiness and optimism of gait."

Although he did not have to face top-class fast bowling in Test matches, he was successful against English fast bowlers such as Harold Larwood in county cricket, and he established his ascendancy over O'Reilly, the world's best bowler at the time. On one occasion, O'Reilly held his head in his hands when he saw Leyland come out to bat, and was heard to say: "Oh, it's that bloody Yorkshireman again!" In later years, O'Reilly vigorously denied that Leyland held the upper hand, responding to such suggestions by saying "You just check how many times I got him out!" The cricket historian David Frith points out that "the answer is nine times in 16 Tests, but with decreasing frequency. In their Test encounters Leyland made 1,412 runs at an average of 56." Robertson-Glasgow noted that Leyland was almost anonymous in good batting conditions under little pressure; he came to life in more difficult circumstances: "His element was foul weather. He would disappear into the haze of Bramall Lane, where a sterner sort of game was being played under the name of cricket, and entrench himself among the sawdust and smoke and off-breaks and appeals, and do his raw, tough work in silence."

Leyland was regarded by critics as a good fielder in almost any position. He bowled left-arm spin, but – contrary to the orthodox practice for a left-arm spinner to use his fingers to spin the ball – usually bowled the ball from the back of his hand, the delivery known as slow left-arm wrist-spin. He did not take bowling seriously, but enjoyed it. In this role, he was effective at times, but other players were used in the main spinner's role for Yorkshire in preference to him, and he was generally used as back-up, for example when the other bowlers had failed to dismiss well-set batsmen. His Wisden obituary suggests that, had he played for another county, he might have developed into a world-class all-rounder. His lack of opportunity prompted him to experiment with left-arm wrist spin, and he later said he originated the term "chinaman" to describe the delivery. Wisden suggests: "Whenever two batsmen were difficult to shift or something different was wanted someone in the Yorkshire team would say, 'Put on Maurice to bowl some of those Chinese things.' Roy Kilner explained, 'It's foreign stuff and you can't call it anything else.'" Another version was that Leyland believed that the particular delivery was only good enough "to get the Chinese out". However, there are several theories over how the delivery came to be named.

Leyland was noted as a humorist in his playing days; many stories are associated with him, although some are probably apocryphal. He told stories against himself. One story concerned his dismissal during a wartime match, in which he was out to a terrible delivery from a bowler who was badly out of practice. Leyland hit the ball in the air and was caught. He ruefully commented: "You know, I don't get much practice against that stuff". Another time, he described how he faced an over from O'Reilly, as related in his obituary in The Cricketer: "'First he bowled me an off-break, then he bowled me a leg-break; then his googly, then a bumper, then one that went with his arm ...' 'But that's only five, Maurice. What about the last one?' 'Oh, that,' said Maurice deprecatingly. 'That was a straight 'un and it bowled me.'" Among his team-mates, Leyland was known as "Tonnip", or "Turnip", possibly a reference to his country upbringing. Robertson-Glasgow and Cardus wrote prolifically on Leyland; Gibson suggests that these pieces are among their best work. Leyland was popular with team-mates, opponents and spectators around the world. Swanton concluded his obituary of Leyland: "No more courageous or determined cricketer ever buckled on pads for England."

== Notes ==
=== Bibliography ===
- Cardus, Neville (1979). Play Resumed with Cardus. London: MacDonald Queen Anne Press. ISBN 0-356-19049-8.
- Cardus, Neville (1982). The Roses Matches 1919–1939. London: Souvenir Press. ISBN 0-285-62520-9.
- Douglas, Christopher (2002). Douglas Jardine: Spartan Cricketer. London: Methuen. ISBN 0-413-77216-0.
- Frith, David (2002). Bodyline Autopsy. London: Aurum Press. ISBN 1-85410-896-4.
- Gibson, Alan (1985). Growing Up with Cricket. London: George Allen & Unwin. ISBN 0-04-796099-X.
- Hill, Alan (2007). Herbert Sutcliffe. Cricket Maestro. Stroud, Gloucestershire: Stadia. ISBN 978-0-7524-4350-8.
- Hodgson, Derek (1989). The Official History of Yorkshire County Cricket Club. Ramsbury, Marlborough, Wiltshire: The Crowood Press. ISBN 1-85223-274-9.
- Lemmon, David (1985). Percy Chapman: a Biography. London: Queen Anne Press. ISBN 0-356-10458-3.
- Robertson-Glasgow, R. C. (1943). Cricket Prints: Some Batsmen and Bowlers, 1920–1940. London: T. Werner Laurie.
- Swanton, E. W. (1999). Cricketers of My Time. London: André Deutsch. ISBN 0-233-99746-6.
- Thomson, A. A. (1967). Cricketers of My Times. London: Stanley Paul. ISBN 978-0-09-084820-1.
- Woodhouse, Anthony (1989). The History of Yorkshire County Cricket Club. London: Christopher Helm. ISBN 0-7470-3408-7.
