= Jim Christy (cricketer) =

South African cricketer

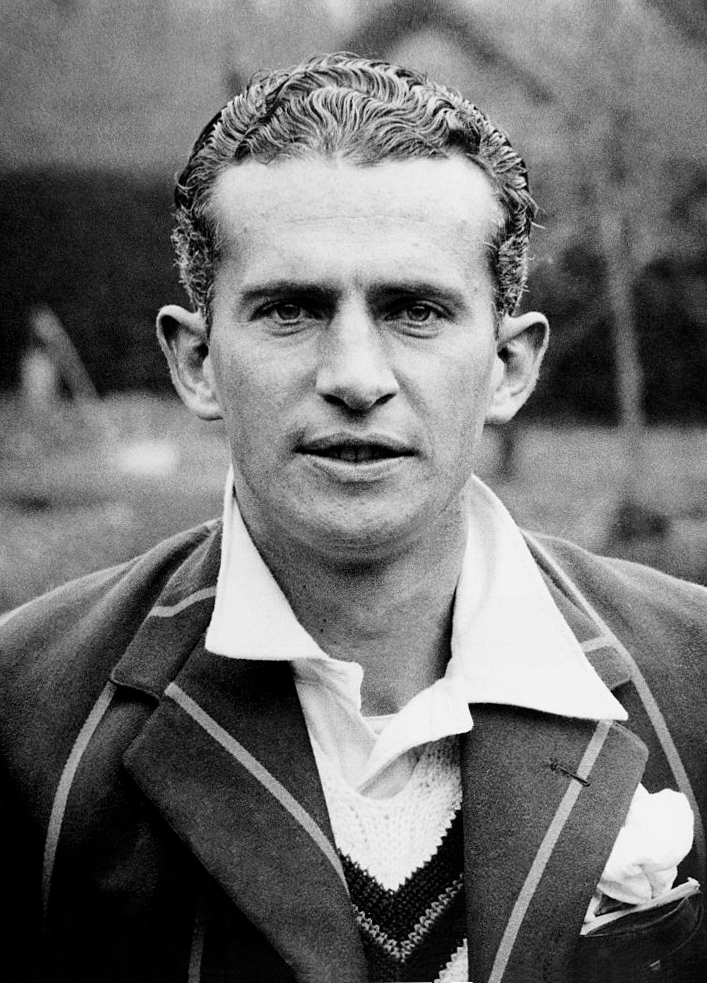
- Christy pictured in 1935

Personal information
- Born: 12 December 1904; Pretoria, Transvaal Colony
- Died: 1 February 1971 (aged 66); Durban, Natal
- Batting: Right-handed
- Bowling: Right-arm medium

International information
- National side: South Africa
- Test debut: 15 June 1929 v England
- Last Test: 4 March 1932 v New Zealand

Career statistics
| Competition | Test | First-class |
|---|---|---|
| Matches | 10 | 65 |
| Runs scored | 618 | 3,670 |
| Batting average | 34.33 | 37.07 |
| 100s/50s | 1/5 | 11/15 |
| Top score | 103 | 175 |
| Balls bowled | 138 | 1,947 |
| Wickets | 2 | 32 |
| Bowling average | 46.00 | 27.93 |
| 5 wickets in innings | 0 | 0 |
| 10 wickets in match | 0 | 0 |
| Best bowling | 1/15 | 4/19 |
| Catches/stumpings | 3/– | 33/– |
- Source: CricketArchive, 14 November 2022

James Alexander Joseph Christy (12 December 1904 – 1 February 1971) was a South African cricketer who played in ten Test matches from 1929 to 1931–32.

Christy was a right-handed batsman often used as an opener and a right-arm medium-pace bowler, though he bowled less as he got older and almost not at all in Tests. He played in South African domestic cricket for Transvaal from 1925–26 to 1929–30, toured England, Australia and New Zealand with the South African team, and then had two seasons playing for Queensland in Australian domestic cricket.
