= Clarrie Grimmett =

Australian cricketer (1891–1980)

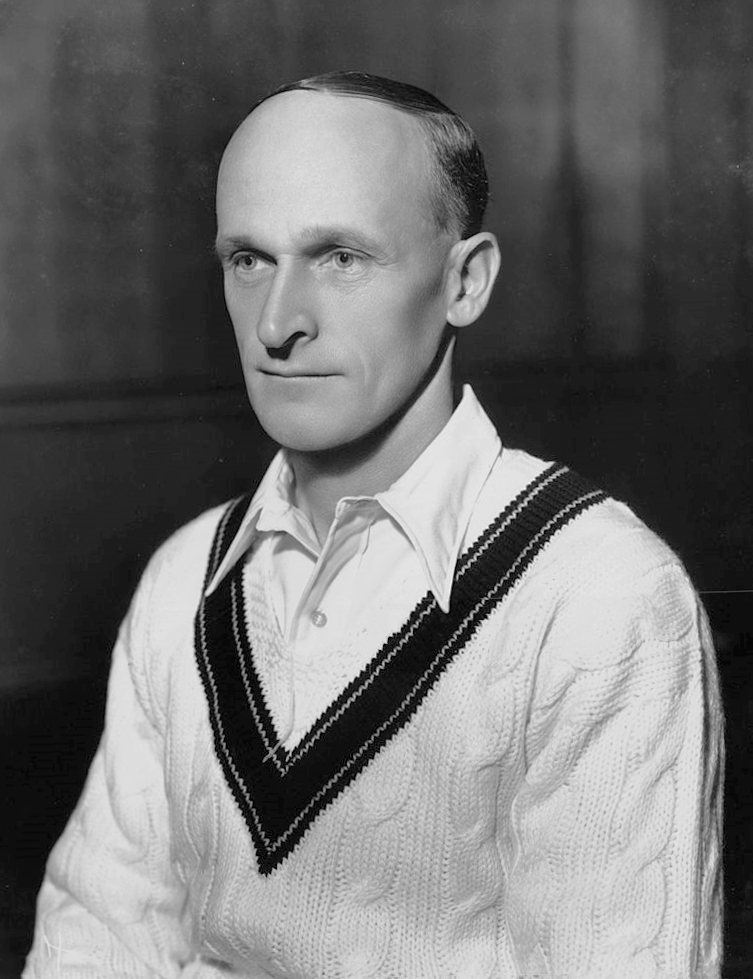
- Grimmett in 1934

Personal information
- Full name: Clarence Victor Grimmett
- Born: 25 December 1891; Dunedin, New Zealand
- Died: 2 May 1980 (aged 88); Adelaide, South Australia, Australia
- Batting: Right-handed
- Bowling: Leg break, googly
- Role: Bowler

International information
- National side: Australia
- Test debut (cap 121): 27 February 1925 v England
- Last Test: 28 February 1936 v South Africa

Career statistics
Competition	Test	First-class
Matches	37	248
Runs scored	557	4,720
Batting average	13.92	17.67
100s/50s	0/1	0/12
Top score	50	71*
Balls bowled	14,513	73,987
Wickets	216	1,424
Bowling average	24.21	22.28
5 wickets in innings	21	127
10 wickets in match	7	33
Best bowling	7/40	10/37
Catches/stumpings	17/–	140/–
- Source: Cricinfo, 13 May 2019

Clarence Victor Grimmett (25 December 1891 – 2 May 1980) was a New Zealand-born Australian cricketer. He was one of the finest spin bowlers of his time and usually credited as the developer of the flipper.

== Early life in New Zealand ==
Grimmett was born in Caversham, Dunedin, Colony of New Zealand, on Christmas Day 1891, leading Bill O'Reilly to say that he "must have been the best Christmas present Australia ever received from that country."

A schoolmaster encouraged him to concentrate on spin bowling rather than fast bowling. He played club cricket in Wellington, and made his first-class debut for Wellington at the age of 17. At that time, New Zealand was not a Test cricketing nation, and in 1914 he moved to neighbouring Australia.

== Life in Australia ==
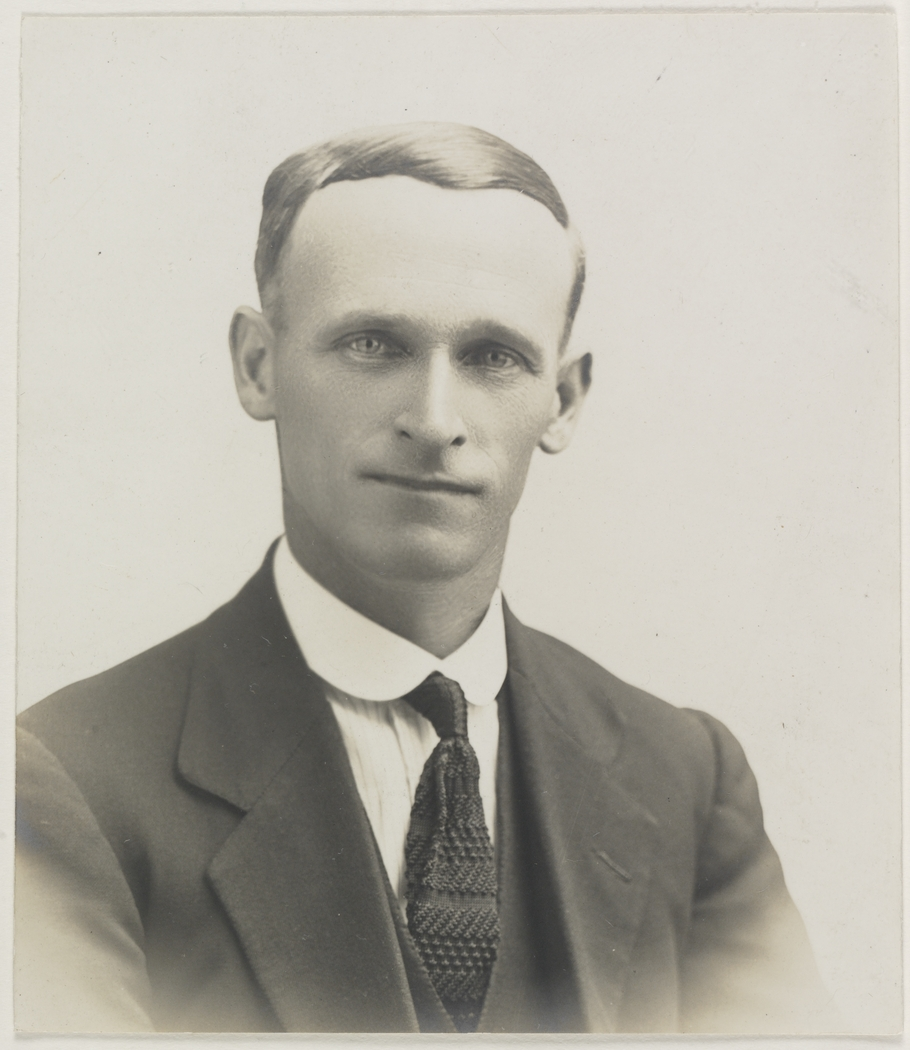
Studio Portrait of Clarrie Grimmett, ca. 1925

He played club cricket in Sydney for three years. In his first match in senior cricket, he took 12 wickets for 65 runs. After marrying a Victorian, he moved to Melbourne, where he played first-class cricket for Victoria. He moved to South Australia in 1923, but it is for his performances in Test cricket for the Australian cricket team that he is best remembered.

Grimmett played 37 Tests between 1924 and 1936, taking 216 wickets at an average of 24.21. He took two five wicket hauls on debut against England in Sydney in 1925. He became the first bowler to reach the milestone of taking 200 Test wickets, and is one of only five Test bowlers who played in their first Test after the age of thirty to take more than 100 wickets, the other four being Dilip Doshi, Saeed Ajmal, Ryan Harris and Mohammed Rafique. He took an average of six wickets per match. Many wickets in the last four years of his Test career were taken bowling in tandem with fellow leg-spinner Bill O'Reilly. Grimmett remains one of the few bowlers with career figures of over 200 wickets in fewer than 40 Tests. He held the record for the fastest bowler to take 200 wickets in Tests, doing so in his 36th match. The record stood for 82 years, until Yasir Shah of Pakistan broke that mark in December 2018.

He took a five-wicket haul on 21 occasions, seven times finishing with ten wickets or more in a match. His Test career only began when he was aged 33, and ended when he was 44, playing his last Test against South Africa in Durban. Despite taking 44 wickets in the series, and continued success in first-class cricket, he was dropped for the 1936/7 series at home against England, replaced by Frank Ward, and did not join the 1938 tour to England.

His first-class records hold a total of 1,424 wickets in 248 matches between 1911 and 1941, again at a rate close to six wickets per match. This total included 5 wicket bags on over 120 occasions and – in one performance for a touring Australian side against Yorkshire in 1930, he took 10 wickets for 37 runs off 22.3 overs, one of only a very small number of players to have claimed all of the wickets in an innings. He took 513 wickets in his 79 Sheffield Shield matches.

Grimmett was a Wisden Cricketer of the Year in 1931, the same year as Donald Bradman. He died in Kensington Park, Adelaide, in 1980, but was posthumously inducted into the Australian Cricket Hall of Fame in 1996 as one of the ten inaugural members. On 30 September 2009, Grimmett was inducted into the ICC Cricket Hall of Fame.

== See also ==
- List of international cricket five-wicket hauls by Clarrie Grimmett

Records
Preceded by Sydney Barnes	Most career wickets in Test cricket 216 wickets (24.21) in 37 Tests; Held record 4 January 1936 to 24 July 1953	Succeeded by Alec Bedser
