= Jock Cameron =

South African cricketer

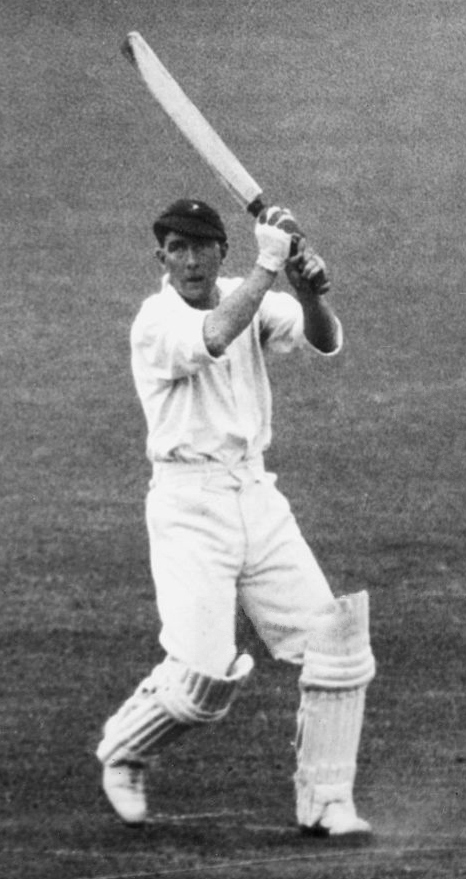
- Jock Cameron c. 1930

Personal information
- Born: 5 July 1905; Port Elizabeth, Cape Colony
- Died: 2 November 1935 (aged 30); Joubert Park, Johannesburg, South Africa
- Batting: Right-handed
- Role: Wicketkeeper-batsman

International information
- National side: South Africa

Career statistics
Competition	Tests	First-class
Matches	26	107
Runs scored	1239	5396
Batting average	30.21	37.47
100s/50s	0/10	11/28
Top score	90	182
Balls bowled	–	16
Wickets	–	–
Bowling average	–	–
5 wickets in innings	–	–
10 wickets in match	–	–
Best bowling	–	–
Catches/stumpings	39/12	155/69
- Source: Cricinfo

Jock Cameron (born Horace Brakenridge Cameron and often known as "Herbie" Cameron; 5 July 1905 – 2 November 1935) was a South African cricketer of the 1920s and 1930s. A tragic figure owing to his premature death when probably the best wicket-keeper in the world, Cameron is often forgotten today but regarded by those who know about him as one of the best wicket-keepers in the history of cricket. Cameron was also a brilliant, hard-hitting middle-order batsman who once hit Hedley Verity for thirty runs off one over.

== Early life ==
Cameron took a keen interest in playing cricket from the time of his tenth birthday and received plenty of encouragement in developing his skill as a wicket-keeper and batsman. He later moved on to Hilton College where he played for the 1st XI.

== Test career ==
After a slow start in the Transvaal team Cameron, from 1925/1926 onwards, consistently showed his superb efficiency as a wicket-keeper and his powerful hitting with the bat. As a result, he took part during 1927/1928 in all five Tests against England on the first overseas tour of South Africa after he began playing. His form in the Tests was sufficiently good that Cameron became a certainty for the England tour of 1929, where he kept wicket in superb form and would certainly have totalled much more than 951 runs and 57 dismissals but for an injury in the Second Test at Lord's when a ball from Harold Larwood rose sharply and hit him on the ribs. A highlight of his tour was the game against Somerset where he made seven dismissals.

Firmly established as a Test regular, Cameron moved owing to his business from Transvaal to Eastern Province the following season, and in 1930/1931 was appointed captain of South Africa for the Fourth Test of 1930/1931 after playing one game for Western Province. He celebrated this appointment with a fighting innings of 69 that saved South Africa and showcased the growing adaptability of his batting and the ability to produce a fighting defence in addition to the hitting power he always possessed. Cameron captained South Africa during the 1931/1932 tour of Australia and New Zealand, but the burden undoubtedly affected his batting in the Tests – he averaged only 15.50 against Australia and South Africa lost all five Tests against Bradman's batting and Grimmett's wonderful bowling.

Returning to Transvaal for the 1932/1933 season, Cameron could only play once in the following two seasons, but was back at his very best in 1934/1935, hitting up a career-best 182 against Griqualand West and keeping wicket as well as ever.

== 1935 tour of England ==
As vice-captain in 1935, Cameron was the focal point of a South African side whose batting strength was sufficient to give it victory over England by one Test to nil (though England had the better of all four draws). In the only decisive result on a spinners' wicket at Lord's (due to leatherjackets having infested the wicket during England's mildest winter on record), Cameron hit his highest Test score of 90 in the first innings. At one stage he hit 58 out of his team's 60 runs in half an hour. The Cricketer wrote: "We have seldom, if ever, seen a batsman who hits a ball so hard and so far with so little apparent effort."

In his famous innings against Yorkshire it was said that "Verity had Cameron in two minds: whether to hit him for four or six". He also hit 132 against second-placed Derbyshire and 160 against an eleven raised by Shrimp Leveson Gower. Louis Duffus wrote: "He began his 1935 tour in England by driving a ball out of the Worcester ground, and from that first day in May onwards he hit sixes all over English fields."

== Death ==
However, when Cameron returned to South Africa he was, to the regret of the cricket world, immediately afflicted with typhoid fever. Treatment proved so ineffective that Cameron died less than two months after he had played his last game of cricket. His loss was a crushing blow to South Africa: in 1935–36 they lost four of their five Tests against Australia due to Grimmett's and O'Reilly's formidable spin bowling (which Cameron's hitting might well have made less dangerous) and it took them until the 1950s to produce teams of comparable strength to that of the 1935 side.

In its obituary notice The Times wrote: "He combined all those qualities of courage, modesty, generosity and cheerfulness which instinctively made themselves felt on the field of cricket, and also off it, to all those who were privileged to know him and who immediately recognised the influence of the man."

During their tour of South Africa in 1935–36, to raise money for Cameron's family the Australians played a baseball match against the Transvaal Baseball Club at the Wanderers ground in Johannesburg. The match raised about 400 pounds.
