= Maurice Tate =

English cricketer (1895–1956)

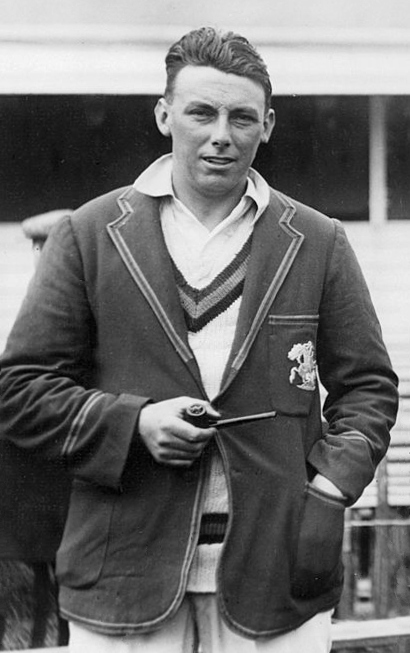
- Tate in 1926

Personal information
- Born: 30 May 1895; Brighton, Sussex, England
- Died: 18 May 1956 (aged 60); Wadhurst, Sussex, England
- Batting: Right-handed
- Bowling: Right-arm fast-medium
- Role: All-rounder

International information
- National side: England
- Test debut: 14 June 1924 v South Africa
- Last Test: 27 July 1935 v South Africa

Career statistics
Competition	Test	First-class
Matches	39	679
Runs scored	1,198	21,717
Batting average	25.48	25.04
100s/50s	1/5	23/93
Top score	100*	203
Balls bowled	12,523	150,461
Wickets	155	2,784
Bowling average	26.16	18.16
5 wickets in innings	7	195
10 wickets in match	1	44
Best bowling	6/42	9/71
Catches/stumpings	11/–	283/–
- Source: CricInfo, 6 November 2022

Maurice William Tate (30 May 1895 – 18 May 1956) was an English cricketer of the 1920s and 1930s and the leader of England's Test bowling attack for a long time during this period. He was also the first Sussex cricketer to take a wicket with his first ball in Test cricket.

The son of Sussex off spinner Fred Tate and nicknamed "Chubby", Maurice began his career for Sussex as a hard-hitting batsman and spin bowler with one match in 1912. He played a few matches in 1913 and 1914, but established himself as a batsman in 1919 by scoring over a thousand runs for the first of eleven consecutive seasons. In the following two years, Tate's batting developed further with a double hundred against Northamptonshire in 1921 representing his highest first-class score. However, his bowling remained secondary throughout this period.

In 1922 Tate had, aided by some very poor batting sides, enjoyed more success as a bowler than in previous years. However, in a famous incident at practice with his captain Arthur Gilligan, he bowled a faster ball, and it scattered the stumps.

This led to the quote "Maurice, you must change your style of bowling immediately". From then on Tate developed as a fast-medium bowler and has been described as a founder of modern seam bowling. Though not exceptionally fast through the air, Tate would give the illusion of gaining speed off the pitch. His easy, rhythmic action and solid build allowed him a high volume of bowling – his bowling of 9,567 deliveries in 1925 is the most among bowlers of medium pace or above. At the same time, he was still opening the batting for Sussex in many matches.

From 1923 to 1925, Tate had great success, not only in county cricket, but also in Test matches. In each of those years he took over 200 wickets, but his batting did not suffer even though Sussex were very weak in this department and though bowling support from Gilligan largely disappeared after 1924 due to a serious injury.

In 1924, on his Test debut, he and Gilligan dismissed South Africa for 30 in just 12.3 overs in the first innings of the First Test, played at Edgbaston. He took 4/12 with Gilligan taking 6/7. Moreover, when he toured Australia in 1924–5, on pitches which had proved too much for all English bowlers since Sydney Barnes and Frank Foster in 1911/1912, Tate took 38 wickets (average 23.18) and got through over 600 balls in three of the five Tests with almost no useful bowling support. It is still the record number of wickets by an Englishman in an Ashes series in Australia.

In the following six years, Tate's grand all-round service to Sussex and England continued, with his batting reaching a peak in 1927, when he hit five centuries for Sussex. In 1929, Tate hit his only Test century against South Africa, but from 1930, whilst he remained a force as a bowler, his batting declined severely and he began to go in later down the batting order. The storm created by Don Bradman that year did not pass Tate. From that time, with exceptionally fast bowlers such as Harold Larwood and Bill Voce available, Tate was no longer an essential member of the England side, though he was still a match-winner for Sussex with 164 wickets in 1932. On his third tour of Australia, he did not play a Test match, and even with Larwood unavailable in 1934, Tate (though still bowling superbly for Sussex) was not chosen for any Test.

In 1936, Tate's bowling waned, except for 7 for 19 against Hampshire, he was much more expensive than before, and after 1937, when he had been in and out of the first eleven, Sussex chose not to retain Tate any longer, but he continued to be a keen observer of the game until his death.

Tate continues to hold the record for the most wickets in a season outside England (116 in 1926–7 in India/Ceylon, average 13.78; he also scored 1,193 runs in that season and is the only man to do a 'double' outside England). He achieved the exceptional double of 1,000 runs and 200 wickets in a season three years running (1923, 1924 and 1925). His career total of 2,784 wickets (average 18.16) is the 11th highest ever, and with 21,717 runs (average 25.01) he is one of only nine people ever to get a career double of 20,000 runs and 2,000 wickets. He took three hat tricks in his career. He was Wisden Cricketer of the year in 1924. Also, Tate was one of the fastest scorers in Test cricket history.
