= Bruce Mitchell (cricketer) =

South African cricketer (1909–1995)

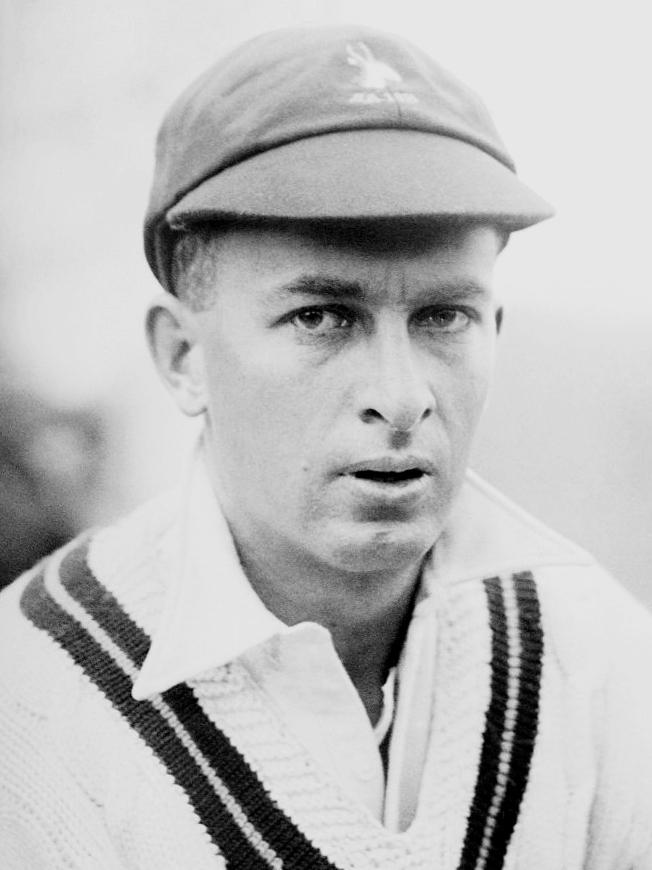
- Bruce Mitchell in 1935

Personal information
- Born: 8 January 1909; Johannesburg, Transvaal
- Died: 1 July 1995 (aged 86); Abbotsford, South Africa
- Batting: Right-handed
- Bowling: Legbreak

International information
- National side: South Africa
- Test debut: 15 June 1929 v England
- Last Test: 5 March 1949 v England

Career statistics
Competition	Test	First-class
Matches	42	173
Runs scored	3,471	11,395
Batting average	48.88	45.39
100s/50s	8/21	30/55
Top score	189*	195
Balls bowled	2,519	12,360
Wickets	27	249
Bowling average	51.11	25.63
5 wickets in innings	1	15
10 wickets in match	0	2
Best bowling	5/87	6/33
Catches/stumpings	56/–	228/–
- Source: Cricinfo, 15 November 2022

Bruce Mitchell (8 January 1909 – 1 July 1995) was a South African cricketer who played in 42 Test matches from 1929 to 1949. He was a right-handed opening batsman and played in every Test South Africa played in that period.

By the end of his career he had 3471 Test runs to his name which at the time was a national record. With his eight centuries he finished just behind Dudley Nourse who made 9.

== Early life ==
The son of a doctor, Mitchell grew up in Johannesburg, where he showed unusual cricket ability as a boy. At the age of six he was coached by Ernest Halliwell, the former South African Test captain. At school at St. John's College, Johannesburg, he received further coaching from the school's cricket coach, A. G. MacDonald. In his teens he used his large hands to master leg-spin bowling.

== Early first-class career ==
Mitchell made his first-class debut for Transvaal, against Border, at the age of 17. He took 11 wickets with his legbreaks and googlies. It was only later in the following season that he started to develop his batting. In 1927–28 the MCC toured South Africa and Mitchell, batting at 3, struck 40 runs. He showcased his all-round abilities against Natal in the 1928–29 trial matches and later in a game against Griqualand West he showed his fighting spirit by rescuing his side after the top six batsmen scored no more than 11 runs between them. His maiden first-class century came in England, against the successful Yorkshire side at Sheffield. For most of the games in the rest of the tour he opened the batting and it would be a position that he would stay in for most of his career.

== Test cricket ==
Mitchell's Test debut came against England on 15 June 1929 at Edgbaston. In both innings he produced a hundred-run opening stand with Robert Catterall and finished the game with 88 and 61 not out. The rest of the series was disappointing and he ended the tour with 251 runs at 31.37.

In 1930–31, he met England on his own shores, and in the First Test he made a second innings 72 in a low-scoring encounter which South Africa went on to win. He was back as opener in the Second Test at Newlands and was part of a national record opening stand of 260 with Jack Siedle, for which Mitchell contributed 123. He scored a further three half-centuries in the remaining three Test to finish with 455 runs at 50.55.

In the summer of 1931–32, Mitchell toured Australia and New Zealand but was ill for most of the tour, finishing with 1048 runs at 34.93. His best performances were 75 and 95 at Adelaide, and 58 at Brisbane.

His form was better in New Zealand. After a century against Auckland he scored 113 in the First Test at Christchurch.

The South Africans toured the UK in 1935 and Mitchell finished second in the averages with 1451 runs at 45.34, despite missing eight matches at the start of the tour. In addition, he took 35 wickets at 19.02, which allowed him to top the bowling averages. In the Tests he scored 488 runs at 69.71, which included centuries at Lord's and The Oval. His innings of 164 not out at Lord's was made in the second innings and helped his side to their first-ever win against England in England. Another highlight of the tour was his highest-ever first class score of 195, made against Surrey at the Oval. That included an opening stand of 330 with Eric Rowan, which was the highest-ever partnership by a South African pair in England.

The Australians visited South Africa in 1935–36 and, in his seven matches, Mitchell only once passed 50. His bowling, however, was more successful: in the 2nd Test he took 4 for 5, with 3 of those wickets being in the same over. In the Fifth Test at Kingsmead he took 5 for 87, which by was his only 5-wicket haul in Tests.

Before the Second World War interrupted his career, he played a series against England in which he finished with 466 runs at an average of 58.25, including a century in a losing cause at Kingsmead.

During the war, Mitchell served with the Transvaal Scottish Regiment in East Africa. On his return to cricket in 1945–46 he scored 426 runs at 47.33 in the domestic season. Against Griqualand West he and Alan Melville created a South African seventh-wicket record stand of 299.

Mitchell returned to the UK in 1947 and went one better than his previous tour there by topping the first-class average with 2014 runs at 61.03. His effort included eight centuries. He finished second in the Test averages with 597 runs at 66.33. His aggregate, however, was the highest by a South African on tour. In the final Test, at the Oval, he wrote his name in the record books by becoming the second South African to score two centuries in a Test. He batted over 13 hours for his innings of 120 and 189 not out, with the latter being his highest Test score.

It was then England's turn to tour South Africa, and with an innings of 120 at Newlands in the Third Test, he equalled Herbie Taylor's record of seven Test centuries against England. In the final Test he made 99 and 56 at Port Elizabeth. This turned out to be his last Test match for South Africa, and he finished his Test career the way he started it, with a pair of 50s.
