= Cyril Vincent =

South African cricketer (1902–1968)

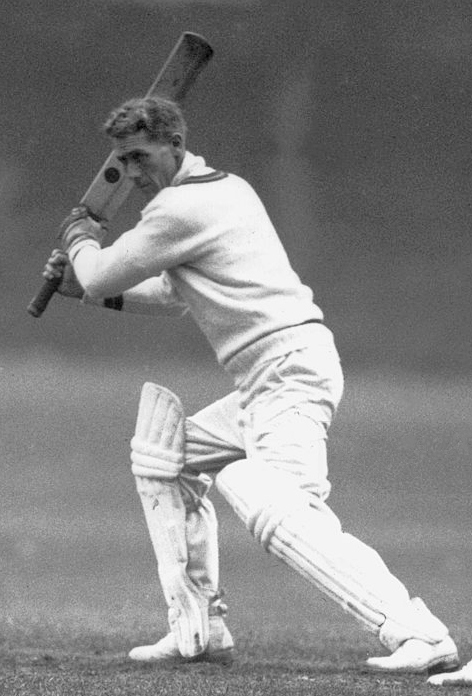
- Vincent in about 1930

Personal information
- Born: 1 February 1902; Johannesburg, South Africa
- Died: 24 August 1968 (aged 66); Bulwer, KwaZulu-Natal, South Africa
- Batting: Left-handed
- Bowling: Slow left-arm orthodox

International information
- National side: South Africa
- Test debut: 24 December 1927 v England
- Last Test: 17 August 1935 v England

Career statistics
Competition	Test	First-class
Matches	25	85
Runs scored	526	1,582
Batting average	20.23	17.97
100s/50s	0/2	0/5
Top score	60	83
Balls bowled	5,851	16,635
Wickets	84	293
Bowling average	31.32	23.91
5 wickets in innings	3	16
10 wickets in match	0	2
Best bowling	6/51	7/36
Catches/stumpings	27/–	69/–
- Source: Cricinfo, 10 September 2022

Cyril Leverton Vincent (16 February 1902 – 24 August 1968) was a South African cricketer who played in 25 Test matches from 1927 to 1935. He was later chairman of the South African selectors.
