= Australian cricket team in England in 1934 =

International cricket tour

- Date: 8 June 1934 — 22 August 1934
- Location: England
- Result: Australia won the 5-Test series 2–1
Teams
- England: Australia
Captains
- RES Wyatt (CF Walters deputised): WM Woodfull
Most runs
- M Leyland (478) CF Walters (401) H Sutcliffe (304): DG Bradman (758); WH Ponsford (569); SJ McCabe (483)
Most wickets
- H Verity (24) WE Bowes (19) K Farnes (10): WJ O'Reilly (28); CV Grimmett (25); TW Wall (6)

Australia won the 1934 Ashes series against England, winning two of the matches and losing one, with the other two tests drawn. The Australian tourists were captained by Bill Woodfull, while the home side were led by Bob Wyatt, with Cyril Walters deputising for Wyatt in the first Test.

In the second Test of the series at Lord's, known as Verity's Match, left-arm spinner Hedley Verity took 15 wickets in the match to hand England their only victory in a Lord's Ashes Test in the twentieth century. The last two Tests of the series were notable for the prodigious runscoring of Bill Ponsford and Donald Bradman, who shared partnerships of at 388 at Headingley (scoring 181 and 304 respectively) and 451 at the Oval (scoring 266 and 244 respectively) in Ponsford's final Test.

== One-day: Ceylon v Australians ==
The Australians had a stopover in Colombo en route to England and played a one-day single-innings match there against the Ceylon national team, which at that time did not have Test status.

4 April 1934
Scorecard

Australians; 284/6d (63 overs)	v	(British Ceylon) Ceylon; 125/5 (28 overs)
Ernest Bromley 80*; Bertram de Kretser 3/73 (14 overs)		Sargo Jayawickreme 56; Hans Ebeling 3/24 (10 overs)

Match Drawn
Nondescripts Cricket Club, Colombo
Umpires: WS Flindall and VR Schokman

== Tour Matches ==
=== First-class Matches ===
2–3 May 1934	Worcestershire	v	Australians	Australians won by an innings and 297 runs
Scorecard	112 (56.3 overs); CF Walters 32; CV Grimmett 5/53 (24 overs)		504 (115 overs); DG Bradman 206; R Howorth 4/135 (23 overs)	New Road, Worcester; Umpires: A Dolphin and TW Oates
Scorecard	95 (46.3 overs); Nawab of Pataudi 27; CV Grimmett 5/27 (15.3 overs)			New Road, Worcester; Umpires: A Dolphin and TW Oates
Worcestershire won the toss and elected to bat; Match was scheduled for three days

5–8 May 1934	Leicestershire	v	Australians	Match Drawn
Scorecard	152 (67.5 overs); AW Shipman 30; WJ O'Reilly 7/39 (24 overs)		368/5d (140 overs); SJ McCabe 108*; G Geary 2/48 (31 overs)	Aylestone Road, Leicester; Umpires: F Chester and J Stone
Scorecard	263/9 (99.5 overs); EW Dawson 91; WJ O'Reilly 4/40 (28 overs)			Aylestone Road, Leicester; Umpires: F Chester and J Stone
Leicestershire won the toss and elected to bat

9–11 May 1934	Cambridge University	v	Australians	Australians won by an innings and 163 runs
Scorecard	158 (66.3 overs); M Jahangir Khan 33; CV Grimmett 9/74 (28.3 overs)		481/5d WH Ponsford 229*; JGW Davies 2/89 (39 overs)	FP Fenner's Ground, Cambridge; Umpires: LC Braund and A Morton
Scorecard	160 (53.1 overs) (f/o); HR Cox 51; LO Fleetwood-Smith 3/31 (11.1 overs)			FP Fenner's Ground, Cambridge; Umpires: LC Braund and A Morton
Australians won the toss and elected to bat

12–15 May 1934	M.C.C	v	Australians	Match Drawn
Scorecard	362 (121.3 overs); EH Hendren 135; TW Wall 6/74 (32.3 overs)		559/6 (161 overs); WH Ponsford 281*; FR Brown 4/134 (37 overs)	Lord's, London; Umpires: J Hardstaff and A Morton
Scorecard	182/8 (72 overs); RES Wyatt 102*; CV Grimmett 4/90 (32 overs)			Lord's, London; Umpires: J Hardstaff and A Morton
Marylebone Cricket Club won the toss and elected to bat

16–18 May 1934	Essex	v	Australians	Australians won by an innings and 93 runs
Scorecard	220 (92.2 overs); M Nichols 62; WJ O'Reilly 6/79 (31.2 overs)		438 (101.2 overs); AG Chipperfield 175; K Farnes 3/111 (24 overs)	County Ground, Chelmsford; Umpires: HG Baldwin and J Hardstaff
Scorecard	125 (56.2 overs); JA Cutmore 31; CV Grimmett 5/54 (26 overs)			County Ground, Chelmsford; Umpires: HG Baldwin and J Hardstaff
Essex won the toss and elected to bat

19–21 May 1934	Oxford University	v	Australians	Australians won by an innings and 33 runs
Scorecard	70 (24.3 overs); RG Tindall 18; LO Fleetwood-Smith 5/30 (9.3 overs)		319 (89.4 overs); LS Darling 100; RG Tindall 5/94 (24 overs)	Christ Church Ground, Oxford; Umpires: JH King and AH Stoner
Scorecard	216 (84.3 overs) (f/o); FC de Saram 128; CV Grimmett 7/109 (36.3 overs)			Christ Church Ground, Oxford; Umpires: JH King and AH Stoner
Australians won the toss and elected to bat

23–25 May 1934	Hampshire	v	Australians	Match Drawn
Report	420 (131.1 overs); WGLF Lowndes 140; SJ McCabe 4/79 (25 overs)		433 (100.5 overs); AG Chipperfield 116; AEG Baring 5/121 (26 overs)	County Ground, Southampton; Umpires: D Hendren and W Reeves
Report	169/7d (75 overs); J Arnold 109*; WJ O'Reilly 4/34 (24 overs)		10/1 (4.1 overs); AG Chipperfield 5* WGLF Lowndes 0/1 (1.1 overs)	County Ground, Southampton; Umpires: D Hendren and W Reeves
Hampshire won the toss and elected to bat

26–28 May 1934	Middlesex	v	Australians	Australians won by 10 wickets
Scorecard	258 (75.2 overs); EH Hendren 115; TW Wall 3/41 (16 overs)		345 (70.2 overs); DG Bradman 160; HJ Enthoven 4/59 (16 overs)	Lord's, London; Umpires: WA Buswell and A Skelding
Scorecard	114 (43.4 overs); EH Hendren 35; CV Grimmett 5/27 (12.4 overs)		29/0 (3.4 overs); BA Barnett 14*	Lord's, London; Umpires: WA Buswell and A Skelding
Middlesex won the toss and elected to bat

30 May-1 June 1934	Surrey	v	Australians	Match Drawn
Scorecard	475/7d (145 overs); A Sandham 219; AG Chipperfield 2/48 (15 overs)		629 (128.2 overs); SJ McCabe 240; AR Gover 5/147 (34 overs)	Kennington Oval, London; Umpires: F Chester and FI Walden
Scorecard	162/2 (42 overs); RJ Gregory 59*; CV Grimmett 1/16 (8 overs)			Kennington Oval, London; Umpires: F Chester and FI Walden
Surrey won the toss and elected to bat

2–5 June 1934	Lancashire	v	Australians	Match Drawn
Scorecard	285 (107.5 overs); GE Tyldesley 107; LO Fleetwood-Smith 5/107 (38 overs)		367 (120 overs); SJ McCabe 142; AD Baxter 3/38 (15 overs)	Old Trafford, Manchester; Umpires: G Beet and JA Newman
Scorecard			338/3 (115 overs); WM Woodfull 172*; FS Booth 1/60 (20 overs)	Old Trafford, Manchester; Umpires: G Beet and JA Newman
Australians won the toss and elected to bat

13–15 June 1934	Australians	v	Northamptonshire	Match drawn
Scorecard	284 (88.1 overs); AG Chipperfield 71; ADG Matthews 4/71 (23 overs)		187 (83.2 overs); AW Snowden 105; LO Fleetwood-Smith 5/63 (27 overs)	County Ground, Northampton; Umpires: W Reeves and J Stone
Scorecard	234 (78.5 overs); WA Brown 113; ADG Matthews 5/87 (26.5 overs)		133/9 (62 overs); AH Bakewell 53; LO Fleetwood-Smith 5/29 (20 overs)	County Ground, Northampton; Umpires: W Reeves and J Stone
Australians won the toss and elected to bat

16–19 June 1934	Gentlemen of England	v	Australians	Australians won by 8 wickets
Scorecard	177 (62.4 overs); WGLF Lowndes 44; CV Grimmett 4/76 (17.4 overs)		230 (61 overs); LS Darling 42; ERT Holmes 3/31 (14 overs)	Lord's, London; Umpires: J Hardstaff and JA Newman
Scorecard	287 (88.3 overs); BH Lyon 67; ERT Holmes 67; CV Grimmett 4/71 (27.3 overs)		235/2 (57 overs); SJ McCabe 105*; FR Brown 1/28 (8 overs)	Lord's, London; Umpires: J Hardstaff and JA Newman
Gentlemen of England won the toss and elected to bat

== Test Matches ==
=== First Test ===
8–12 June 1934
Scorecard

Australia	v	England
374 (152.2 overs); AG Chipperfield 99 (208); K Farnes 5/102 (40.2 overs)		268 (138.3 overs); EH Hendren 79 (247); CV Grimmett 5/81 (58.3 overs)
273/8d (90 overs); SJ McCabe 88 (121); K Farnes 5/77 (25 overs)		141 (107.4 overs); CF Walters 46 (153); WJ O'Reilly 7/54 (41.4 overs)

Australia won by 238 runs
Trent Bridge, Nottingham
Umpires: F Chester and A Dolphin

- Australia won the toss and elected to bat
- Test debut: WA Brown, AG Chipperfield (Aus) and K Farnes (Eng)

=== Second Test ===
22–25 June 1934
Scorecard

England	v	Australia
440 (198.3 overs); Les Ames 120 (325); Tim Wall 4/108 (49 overs)		284 (109 overs); Bill Brown 105 (202); Hedley Verity 7/61 (36 overs)
		118 (f/o) (53.3 overs); Bill Woodfull 43 (118); Hedley Verity 8/43 (22.3 overs)

England won by an innings and 38 runs
Lord's, London
Umpires: Frank Chester and Joe Hardstaff, Sr.

- England won the toss and elected to bat

=== Third Test ===
6–10 July 1934
Scorecard

England	v	Australia
627/9d (201 overs); Maurice Leyland 153 (309); Bill O'Reilly 7/189 (59 overs)		491 (190.3 overs); Stan McCabe 137 (204); Hedley Verity 4/78 (53 overs)
123/0d (52 overs); Herbert Sutcliffe 69 (161)		66/1 (27 overs); Stan McCabe 33 (74); Gubby Allen 1/23 (6 overs)

Match Drawn
Old Trafford, Manchester
Umpires: Joe Hardstaff, Sr. and Fanny Walden

- England won the toss and elected to bat
- Test debut: JL Hopwood (England)

=== Fourth Test ===
20–24 July 1934
Scorecard

England	v	Australia
200 (105.4 overs); Cyril Walters 44 (114); Clarrie Grimmett 4/57 (30.4 overs)		584 (183.5 overs); Donald Bradman 304 (473); Bill Bowes 6/142 (50 overs)
229/6 (135.5 overs); Maurice Leyland 49 (186); Clarrie Grimmett 3/72 (56.5 overs)

Match Drawn
Headingley, Leeds
Umpires: Arthur Dolphin and Joe Hardstaff, Sr.

- England won the toss and elected to bat
- Test debut: WW Keeton (Eng)

=== Fifth Test ===
18–22 August 1934
(Timeless Test)
Scorecard

Australia	v	England
701 (171.2 overs); Bill Ponsford 266 (422); Bill Bowes 4/164 (38 overs)		321 (117.3 overs); Maurice Leyland 110 (171); Hans Ebeling 3/74 (21 overs)
327 (68.3 overs); Donald Bradman 77 (106); Bill Bowes 5/55 (11.3 overs)		145 (63.3 overs); Wally Hammond 43 (113); Clarrie Grimmett 5/64 (26.3 overs)

Australia won by 562 runs
Kennington Oval, London
Umpires: Frank Chester and Fanny Walden

- Australia won the toss and elected to bat
- 19 August was taken as a rest day.
- The match was completed in four days.
- Test debut: HI Ebeling (Aus)

== Annual reviews ==
- Wisden Cricketers' Almanack 1935
