= Stan McCabe =

Australian cricketer (1910–1968)

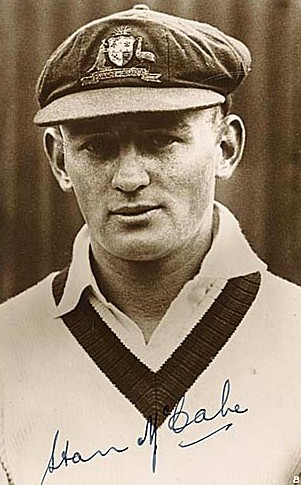
- McCabe in 1930

Personal information
- Full name: Stanley Joseph McCabe
- Born: 16 July 1910; Grenfell, New South Wales, Australia
- Died: 25 August 1968 (aged 58); Mosman, New South Wales, Australia
- Nickname: Napper
- Batting: Right-handed
- Bowling: Right-arm medium pace
- Role: All-rounder

International information
- National side: Australia
- Test debut (cap 134): 13 June 1930 v England
- Last Test: 24 August 1938 v England

Domestic team information
- Years: Team
- 1928–1941: New South Wales

Career statistics
Competition	Tests	FC
Matches	39	182
Runs scored	2,748	11,951
Batting average	48.21	49.38
100s/50s	6/13	29/68
Top score	232	240
Balls bowled	3,746	13,440
Wickets	36	159
Bowling average	42.86	33.72
5 wickets in innings	0	1
10 wickets in match	0	0
Best bowling	4/13	5/36
Catches/stumpings	41/0	139/0
- Source: CricketArchive, 29 February 2008

Stanley Joseph McCabe (16 July 1910 – 25 August 1968) was an Australian cricketer who played 39 Test matches for Australia from 1930 to 1938. A short, stocky right-hander, McCabe was described by Wisden as "one of Australia's greatest and most enterprising batsmen" and by his captain Don Bradman as one of the great batsmen of the game. He was never dropped from the Australian Test team and was known for his footwork, mastery of fast bowling and the hook shot against the Bodyline strategy. He also regularly bowled medium-pace and often opened the bowling at a time when Australia lacked fast bowlers, using an off cutter. He was one of the Wisden Cricketers of the Year in 1935.

At the age of 19, McCabe was called up for the 1930 tour of England despite being yet to score his maiden first-class century as the selectors chose the youngest ever team to leave Australia. McCabe made his first century in a warm-up match but struggled in his month in England, scoring only 51 runs. His performance began to improve after adjusting his technique and he played in all five Tests, although he continued to have problems converting starts into large scores, failing to make a century during the tour. McCabe managed to maintain his position over the next two home seasons, playing in all ten Tests, but failed to make a century, and after 15 Tests, his average was below 35 although he had become increasingly successful at first-class level.

In 1932–33, McCabe made his breakthrough at international level in the First Test of the infamous Bodyline series, scoring an unbeaten 187 at the Sydney Cricket Ground in only four hours as his teammates fell around him. McCabe attacked the bowling vigorously, hooking relentlessly. He ended the series as the only Australian other than Bradman to score a century. McCabe missed most of the next season due to illness, but was retained for the 1934 tour of England despite his interrupted preparation. He scored 2,078 runs and eight centuries for the tour, including his maiden Test century in England. Following the retirement of captain Bill Woodfull at the end of the tour, McCabe became Australia's vice-captain and held the post for the rest of his career.

After missing most of the 1934–35 domestic season due to injury, McCabe scored an unbeaten 189 in the Second Test of the 1935–36 tour of South Africa, including a century in one session, taking Australia to the brink of a world record-breaking victory on a difficult final-day pitch in poor light before the match was called off. It was one of two Test centuries McCabe made on the tour. The following season, he made five fifties in the first four Tests before scoring a century to help Australia win the deciding final Test against the touring Englishmen. In the First Test of the 1938 tour of England, McCabe played what was regarded as his greatest innings, scoring 232 in four hours, including his last 72 in 28 minutes. Bradman regarded the innings as the greatest batting he ever saw. However, none of McCabe's three most famous innings resulted in an Australian victory; he has a reputation of being at his best when Australia was in difficulty.

During the 1938 tour, McCabe had been generally unproductive and he missed much of the subsequent Australian season due to illness and only played sporadically thereafter before cricket was cancelled due to World War II. He served in the military in a clerical position for a year before he was discharged due to chronic feet problems. McCabe was plagued by poor health in his middle age, and was hospitalised for a liver ailment shortly before his death. He died at the age of 58 after falling off a cliff adjacent to his home in Mosman. There was innuendo that it was a suicide, but the coroner ruled that it was an accident.

== Early years ==
McCabe's paternal grandparents settled in Grenfell, New South Wales in the 1850s; his grandfather Constable Edward James McCabe was an Irish policeman who immigrated to Australia and served in the Victorian Police. Edward left the constabulary and moved from Melbourne to Grenfell after reports of a gold rush. Edward's wife Catherine was ambushed by bushrangers during her relocation to the town with her children three weeks later, but was unharmed. The bushrangers scoured the family's possessions, but left after finding nothing of value. Her obituary described her as "one of the greatest of the pioneer women of the Australian bush, possessing all the qualities of self-sacrifice, resourcefulness, industry, determination, and courage that left their mark on the Australian race and laid the foundation of the nation". Her grandson, one of 37 grandchildren, was likewise known for his fearless and courageous play on the cricket field against the most intimidating bowlers of his time.

The son of local barber William "Bill", McCabe was the third of four brothers, who grew up playing local cricket in his hometown. The siblings played with rudimentary equipment; a lump of wood was substituted for a bat and cork wrapped in socks improvised as cricket balls. The boys settled their differences in the traditional manner of boxing bouts, and they took their primary education at a Catholic convent staffed by nuns.

At the age of 14, McCabe won a scholarship to the Catholic St. Joseph's College, Hunters Hill in Sydney due to his sporting ability. Run by the Marist Brothers, the large school's centrepiece stone castle-like building overlooks Sydney Harbour. After a month in the Second XI, McCabe was promoted to the Senior First XI at 14 as an all-rounder. He did not make a good start, registering a duck in his first innings. However, he impressed observers with his ability to hit the ball precisely. McCabe was always short, and playing against boys three years his senior, he could not rely on brute force. Aside from playing cricket, he was also full-back in the school's championship winning Rugby union team in 1926. During his time at St Joseph's McCabe grew larger and batted more powerfully, and his exploits were regularly featured in the yearbook. In 1925, he struck his maiden century against Sydney Boys High School and score two more the following year. Such was his power that the backyard fence at the home of a friend had to be reinforced—McCabe's powerful square drives had been dislodging it. McCabe did not receive special coaching attention from the school's staff, who merely encouraged him to hit the ball hard and along the ground. In his later years at school, he was selected for Combined Great Public Schools of Sydney—a combined team from Sydney's private schools—for the state schoolboys' carnival. McCabe studied hard and placed first in the class in each of his three years at St Joseph's. At the end of 1926, he earned his Intermediate Certificate with five As and two Bs. McCabe then left school and became an accountant's assistant.

He returned to Grenfell at the end of the 1926, and spent two years playing for the Grenfell Juniors, alongside his brothers. During this time Grenfell were undefeated for two years, and McCabe regularly scored centuries against outclassed bowling, including one score of 260.

In 1927, McCabe's cricket came to high-level attention for the first time. Charlie Macartney, who had just retired from Test cricket, brought a team that included six internationals, to Grenfell. McCabe scored 17 and took 5/84 against them. Then state and future Australian selector Chappie Dwyer, who led a team of Sydney Grade Cricketers to play in the country town. The McCabe brothers defeated them, Stan scoring 19. Later, the Test leg spinner Arthur Mailey led a team that also included Test player Tommy Andrews to Grenfell, and McCabe scored 62, 35 and 62 not out in three innings against them. In the 1927–28 season, McCabe played for the Southern Districts against other regional sides within the state. He made 92 not out in one match, but failed to pass 12 in six other innings. Dwyer returned in 1927–28 and McCabe scored 70 against his team. Dwyer convinced McCabe's parents to allow their son to move to Sydney to further his cricket career.

At the start of the following season, McCabe appeared with the New South Wales Colts team in one match against Queensland, before being selected for the New South Wales Second XI to play their Victorian counterparts. McCabe scored 60 not out in the second innings and took a total of 6/100 for the match. He was selected to represent New South Wales in his first-class debut against Queensland in the 1928–29 Sheffield Shield season while the Test players competed against England. He made 60 and 34, and bowled 17 overs without success, but was later omitted when the Test players returned from international duty. In four first-class matches in his debut season, McCabe scored 197 runs at 32.83 and took a total of 1/111. McCabe played twice against the touring England cricket team led by Percy Chapman, once in a match at Goulburn for the Southern Districts of New South Wales, and the other time for his state, but managed only 24 runs in three innings.

McCabe settled in Sydney permanently in 1929, representing Mosman Cricket Club in Sydney Grade Cricket. His parents only allowed him to settle there permanently if Dwyer could help find him a job and lodgings, and McCabe subsequently began work in the accounting division of Colonial Mutual Insurance Company. Dwyer could only support one player and hard a hard decision in eventually turning down the second McCabe brother Les. Both Stan and Les were similar in batting ability but the former could also bowl.

During the 1929–30 season, McCabe totalled 844 runs at 56.27, making him the second-highest runscorer behind Bradman, as New South Wales won the Sheffield Shield. Despite his consistency, McCabe had difficulty capitalising on his starts. He passed 50 on eight occasions in the first eight matches of the season, and reached 29 in ten of his 12 innings, but failed to make a century, falling seven times between 60 and 90.

== International debut ==
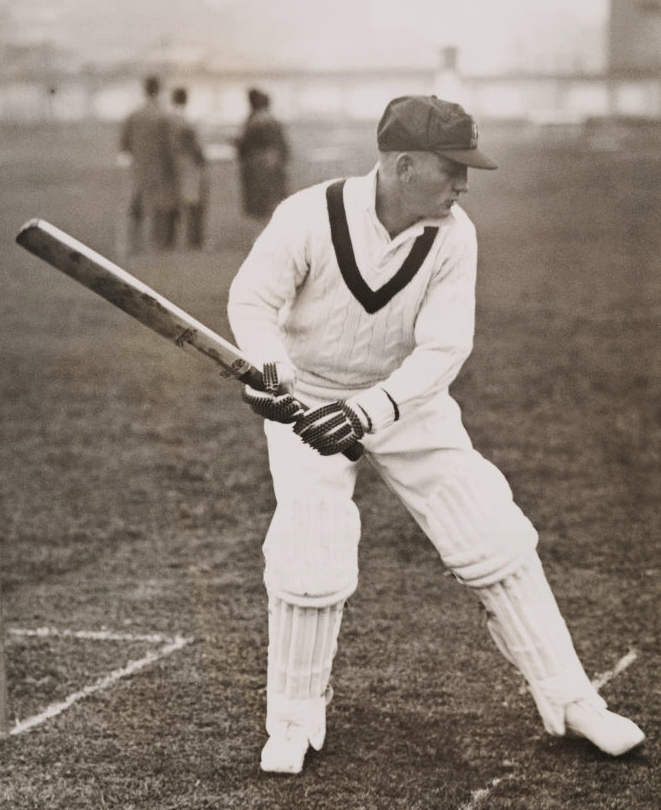
McCabe during the tour of England on 28 April 1930

Nevertheless, McCabe was selected to the 1930 tour of England under Bill Woodfull's Australian cricket team. The team was the then-youngest to have left Australian shores, and only four had previous experience on English soil. As a result, the team was dubbed "Woodfull's kindergarten". In the traditional warm-up matches before the team sailed for England, McCabe struck 103 against Tasmania, his maiden first-class century. One of the reasons that McCabe was chosen despite his lack of centuries was his medium pace bowling. At the time, Australia lacked fast bowlers and McCabe was seen as a makeshift opening bowler; he had taken 17 wickets at 30.82 for the season, including a career best of 5/36 against Queensland.

On his first overseas trip, McCabe struggled badly in his first four weeks in England. In six matches in that time, he scored only 51 runs at 7.28 and failed to take a wicket after being asked to bowl only 18 overs. After being dismissed in the last of these matches, McCabe came off the field and despondently said that he was going to retire. Teammate Clarrie Grimmett suggested that McCabe play with a fuller face of the bat, advice that the batsman accepted. McCabe's fortunes changed in the next match against Oxford University; he scored 91 and took 1/5 in an innings win. He added 65 in the next match against Hampshire and starred with both bat and ball against Cambridge University, the final tour match before the First Test. McCabe scored 96 before being run out, and took 4/25 and 4/60, which would remain his career best match bowling figures, as Australia completed a commanding innings victory.

He made his Test debut in the first match of the Ashes series at Trent Bridge, Nottingham. He took match figures of 2/65, his first wicket being Jack Hobbs, and in his first Test innings as a batsman, he hit the first ball for a boundary but was dismissed off the next ball, before scoring 49 in the second innings as Australia chased 428 for victory. McCabe and Don Bradman were scoring quickly and had taken the score to 3/229 when McCabe lofted Maurice Tate towards mid-on. Syd Copley, a member of the ground staff who was acting as a substitute fielder dived forward and took a difficult catch. McCabe's dismissal sparked a collapse of 7/104 as England took a 93-run win. McCabe scored 44 and an unbeaten 25 as Australia squared the series with a seven-wicket triumph in the Second Test at Lords. McCabe made 30 in a rain-affected draw in the Third Test, before scoring four and taking 4/41 in the Fourth Test at Old Trafford, removing Ranjitsinhji, Maurice Leyland, Maurice Tate and Ian Peebles to reduce England to 8/251 in another wash out. With the series locked at 1–1, the Fifth and final Test at The Oval was a timeless Test. McCabe scored his first Test half-century of 54 as Australia piled on 695 to win by an innings and reclaim the Ashes 2–1. McCabe took one wicket in the deciding match, bowling leading English batsman Wally Hammond for 13. In all, McCabe scored 210 runs at 35.00 and took eight wickets at 27.62 in the Tests, and aggregated 1012 runs at 32.64 and took 26 wickets at 27.80 for the whole tour. This made him the fifth highest run-scorer for the tour. However, he was unable to register a century on tour, his highest score being 96. He continued his habit of failing to convert his starts into centuries in the tour matches after the start of the Tests. In one stretch of eight county innings, he registered scores between 34 and 79 seven times, and he ended with seven fifties for the tour. Nevertheless, Wisden praised his attacking ability to disrupt the length of opposition bowlers. On two occasions, McCabe took more than two wickets in an innings.

Upon his return to Australia, McCabe played all five Tests against the West Indies in 1930–31. He scored 90 in the First Test at the Adelaide Oval as Australia took victory by ten wickets. However, he struggled thereafter, scoring 31, eight and two as Australia won the next three matches by an innings. He managed 21 and 44 as the tourists took their only Test victory of their first Test tour to Australia. McCabe totalled 196 runs at 32.66 and took three wickets at 42.00. However, he managed a century against the West Indies for New South Wales in the latter part of the season and scored 161 and 53 in a match against Queensland. He took 4/46 in a Shield match against Victoria, removing Test players Hunter Hendry, Keith Rigg, Len Darling and Ted a'Beckett. Overall, McCabe finished the season with 705 runs at 41.47 and 16 wickets at 35.00.

The following year, McCabe scored centuries in all of his three Sheffield Shield innings, scoring 229* Queensland at Brisbane and 106 and 103* in one match against Victoria in Sydney, yielding a Shield season average of 438.00. His innings against Queensland was particularly lauded, showcasing his ability against the most hostile of fast bowling. Queensland's attack was led by Eddie Gilbert, an indigenous paceman who was the fastest in Australia and whom Bradman said was the fastest that he had ever faced. On one occasion, a particularly fast Gilbert delivery supposedly evaded both the batsman and wicket-keeper, travelled more than 60 metres and crashed through a fence before hitting and killing a dog on the other side. On this day, Gilbert knocked the bat out of Bradman's hand before removing him for a duck. Gilbert cut down the New South Wales top order with a spell of 3/12 and forced Alan Kippax to retire hurt after hitting him in the upper body. This left New South Wales at effectively 4/21. Undeterred, McCabe came in and bravely counterattacked in a display that featured many aggressive hook and cut shots. The visitors made 432 before McCabe took a total of 3/27 to help his state take an innings win as the hosts were bowled out for 109 and 85. In the match against arch-rivals and defending champions Victoria, McCabe added 3/57 and 1/18 with the ball as New South Wales won by 239 runs, and went on to claim the title, despite McCabe not being able to contribute in final match of the season; he injured himself while in the field and was unable to bat in a 132-run defeat at the hands of South Australia.

McCabe was unable to translate the success into the Test arena, where McCabe struggled despite his team's 5–0 sweep over South Africa. McCabe warmed up for the series by scoring 37 and 79 not out and totalling 3/108 in a state match against the tourists. After managing only 27 in an innings victory in the First Test, McCabe saved his most productive Test of the summer for his home crowd for the Second Test at Sydney. He took 4/13 in the first innings, bowling or trapping all of his victims leg before wicket, and then compiled 79 as Australia cruised to another innings win. McCabe scored 22 and 71 and took two wickets in the Third Test win in Melbourne, but managed only two runs and three wickets in the last two Tests, which Australia won by an innings. McCabe ended the series with 201 runs at 33.50 and nine wickets at 22.77. McCabe ended the season with 783 runs at 87.00 and 19 wickets at 23.94.

During the Australian winter of 1932, former Test leg spinner Arthur Mailey organised and managed a tour of prominent Australian players, of whom McCabe was one, to North America. They played 51 matches in 100 days, none of which were first-class; most were one-day matches, although not limited overs. McCabe played in 48 of the matches; he scored eight centuries and averaged 54 with the bat. He took seven or more wickets in an innings 12 times including 12 in one innings, and totalled 189 wickets at an average of six.

== Bodyline ==
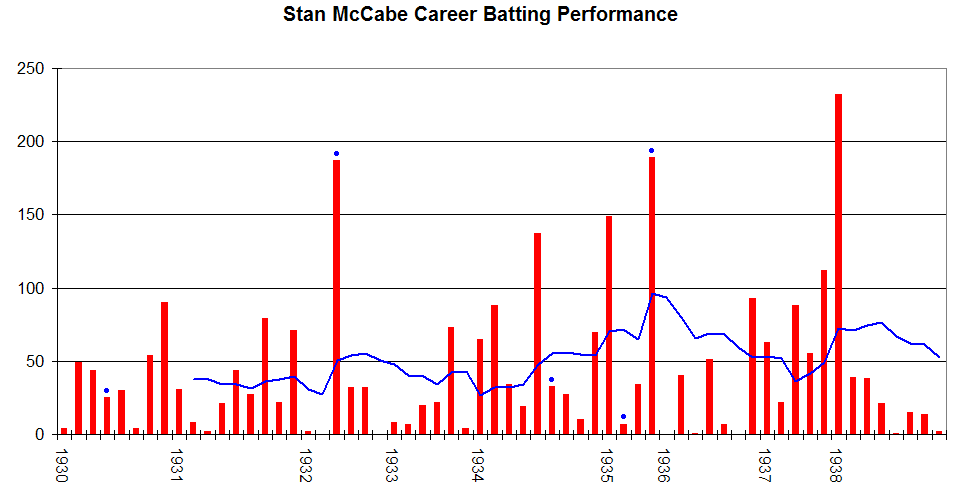
Stan McCabe's Test career batting performance. The red bars indicate the runs that he scored in an innings, with the blue line indicating the batting average in his last ten innings. The blue dots indicate an innings where he remained not out.

McCabe made his breakthrough in the following Australian season in 1932–33, which went down in history due to England's use of the controversial Bodyline tactics. In the lead-up to the Tests, McCabe scored 43, 67 and 19 in two tour matches against the Englishmen.

In the First Test in Sydney, with England captain Douglas Jardine again employed Bodyline. This involved constant intimidatory short-pitched leg-side bowling with a leg-cordon to catch balls fended off by the batsman, in an attempt to curtail Donald Bradman, generally regarded as the best batsman ever, from scoring. McCabe came to the wicket on the first day, the score at 3/82 with Bill Woodfull, Bill Ponsford and Jack Fingleton already dismissed, and Bradman not playing due to illness. Having warned his parents, who were watching him in Test cricket for the only time, not to jump the fence if he was hit, McCabe took guard. Jardine had deployed seven men on the leg-side, usually with five close catchers and two men patrolling the boundary for hook shots. McCabe hooked the first ball he received from Bodyline spearhead Harold Larwood for a boundary. After Kippax fell with the score at 87, McCabe and Vic Richardson added 129 before Richardson fell. McCabe reached stumps at 127 not out with the total 6/290. His innings was marked by dangerous cutting and compulsive hooking of short-pitched deliveries in front of his face, unfazed by the repeated body blows which hit his teammates.

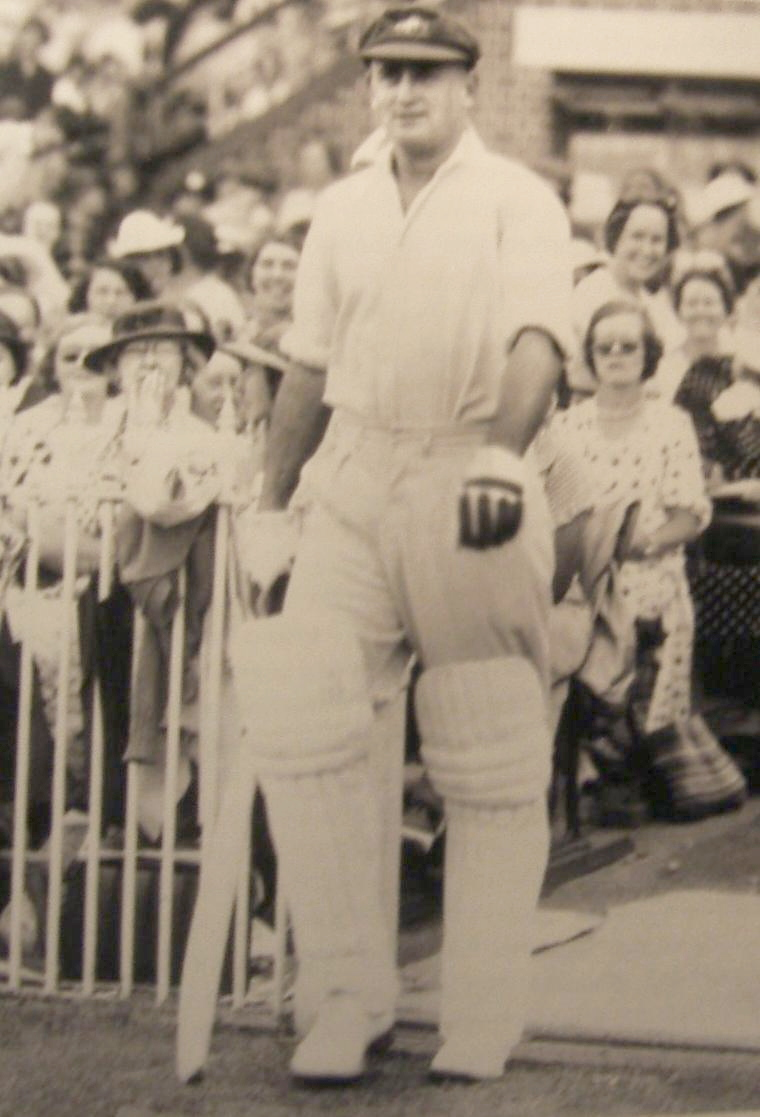
McCabe walks out to bat during the First Test of the Bodyline series.

McCabe's attack forced Jardine to abandon his Bodyline approach. Jardine removed Larwood from the attack and brought on Gubby Allen. Under the professional-amateur divide of the time, England's captain was always an amateur, and professionals, such as Larwood, were obliged to obey the captain's orders. Allen was an amateur who refused to bowl Bodyline. McCabe struck three consecutive fours from Allen's conventional fast bowling, prompting Jardine to call for Bodyline field placings. Allen refused, so Jardine was forced to drop his Bodyline attack and resort to the spin bowling of Hedley Verity and Wally Hammond. The crowd responded to his instinctive aggression with wild cheering. McCabe said that "it was really an impulsive, senseless innings, a gamble that should not have been made but came off against all the odds".

McCabe scored 60 of the 70 runs that Australia added on the second day to finish 187 not out from 233 balls as Australia were bowled out for 360. McCabe added the runs in just one hour of batting and ended with 25 boundaries in his innings, which lasted a little over four hours. He was particularly effectively in farming the strike while batting with his tail end partners; in his last wicket stand of 55 with Tim Wall, he scored 50 of the runs in just half an hour.

He was praised by Larwood, who spearheaded the Bodyline attack and totalled 10/128 for the match, which ended in a decisive 10-wicket victory for England. Wisden reported that McCabe "scored off Larwood's bowling in a style which for daring and brilliance was not approached by any other Australian during the tour". Richard Whitington wrote in the 1970s that McCabe's innings "still warms the blood of the dwindling number of Australians who watched it". McCabe received a thunderous standing ovation from the 46,000 spectators. Immediately after the innings, McCabe told his teammates that he would never be able to replicate the feat because it was too difficult to hook the ball consistently without hitting it up into the air and giving away catching opportunities.

Umpire George Hele, who officiated the match said:

Stan gave Voce all he was bargaining for. He and Vic Richardson took all the English bowlers could hurl at them. This innings stamped Stan as one of the world's greatest batsmen. He stepped into the [trajectory of the] bowling, he hooked, he pulled, and did what he liked with it. The faster they bowled the more he seemed to enjoy it.

Australia's captain Woodfull refused to retaliate and England made 524 in reply, McCabe having Jardine caught behind for 27 to end with 1/42. McCabe was one of the few Australians to make any impact in the second innings, making 32 as Australia fell for 164.

McCabe was unable to repeat his performances in the later Tests. He made 32 and a duck as Australia gained its only victory in the Second Test in Melbourne, before managing only 57 runs in the next four innings as Australia suffered consecutive defeats. He scored 73 in the first innings of the Fifth Test in Sydney as Australia compiled 435, but scored only four in a second innings collapse, leaving England with an eight-wicket victory. He had persisted with his strategy of standing his ground attacking the Bodyline bowling, but was unsuccessful.

McCabe totalled 385 runs at 42.78 for the series and was the only Australian batsman other than Bradman to score a century, as the English decisively won the series 4–1. He took three wickets at 71.66, and opened the bowling in some of the matches due to Australia's lack of fast bowling. It was a far cry from the intimidation that Bodyline provided.

Away from the tumult of Bodyline, McCabe played in five of New South Wales' six Sheffield Shield matches, and he scored 348 runs at 49.71 with four fifties and took 11 wickets at 17.54. New South Wales won four of these matches and drew the other to retain their title. His most prominent effort was a 91 and a match total of 5/41 in an innings win over Queensland.

The 1933–34 season started well for McCabe. He started the season with scores of 20, 82, 110 and 8 in three matches in November, the century coming against the Rest of Australia. However, he was hampered by illness, which forced him to have an operation, which sidelined him for more than three months. The selectors nevertheless chose him for the 1934 tour of England, and McCabe returned to make 119 and 27 in two matches for the touring party against Tasmania before they departed for the northern hemisphere.

== 1934 tour of England ==
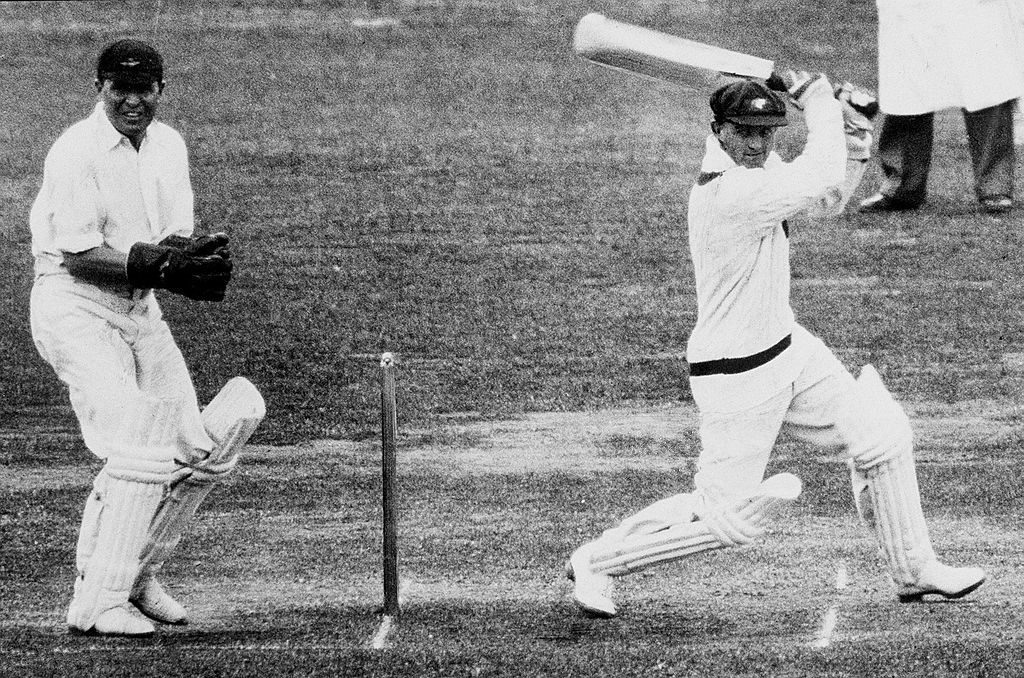
Les Ames and Stan McCabe (right) in June 1934 at MCC vs. Australia at Lord's

Returning to England in 1934, McCabe scored 2,078 runs at 69.28 including eight centuries on the tour, more than any of his teammates. In the second match of the tour against Leicestershire, McCabe scored the century that had eluded him four years earlier, finishing 108 not out. He then scored 192 against the Marylebone Cricket Club at Lord's, combining with Ponsford in a record partnership for the third wicket of 389, in what was effectively a dress rehearsal for the Tests; the MCC fielded almost a full-strength England team. McCabe put in an all round performance against Hampshire, scoring 79 and taking 4/79 in the first innings. In the next match, he scored 240, the highest of his career, against Surrey at The Oval. In the next match, the last fixture before the Tests, McCabe made 142 against Lancashire.

In the First Test at Trent Bridge, McCabe made 65 in the first innings before scoring 88 in the second innings to extend Australia's first innings lead from 106 to a target of 380. The hosts fell short by 238 runs. Between Tests, McCabe registered his fifth century of the season, making an unbeaten 105 in the second innings as Australia defeated the Gentlemen of England by eight wickets. McCabe then scored 34 and 19 as England struck back with an innings victory at Lord's. Between Tests, he took 4/24 in a six-wicket win over Surrey. He then scored his first Test century on English soil during the high-scoring draw in the Third Test at Old Trafford, compiling 137 and 33 not out. The hosts gave McCabe a taste of his own medicine, and he had to bowl 45 overs for a match total of 1/133, as England's batsmen totalled 10/750 for the match.

McCabe made 27 in the rain-affected draw in the Fourth Test, the culmination of a quiet fortnight in which he failed to pass 30. He then scored fifties in three consecutive tour matches before the Fifth Test, which was timeless as the series was tied 1–1. McCabe scored 10 and 70 and took 2/5 in the second innings as Australia won the match by 562 runs to regain the Ashes 2–1. McCabe aggregated 483 runs at 60.37 and took four wickets in the Tests. At the time, Wisden said of him: "He blossomed forth as an almost completely equipped batsman of the forcing type and was probably the best exponent—Bradman himself scarcely excluded—of the art of hitting the ball tremendously hard and safely." Wisden said that McCabe had made "immense strides" in his batting technique. It said "In 1930 he gave the impression of still having a good deal to learn; he was inclined to be somewhat slapdash in his methods. The intervening years had clearly made a great difference in him. Losing nothing of his power, he displayed a wider and safer range of strokes." McCabe finished the tour with 108 against Kent and 124 in an innings win over HDG Leveson-Gower's XI a took 21 wickets for the entire season.

McCabe spent most of the 1934–35 Australian season watching from the sidelines. The first match of the summer was a testimonial for retiring Australian captain Woodfull. McCabe was forced to retire hurt when on five, and he missed more than two months of cricket. He returned for only one match, scoring 92 and 53 as New South Wales were defeated by arch-rivals Victoria.

== 1935–36 South African tour ==
The following Australian season he became captain of New South Wales following the retirement of Kippax and the departure of Bradman to South Australia. However, with Australia touring South Africa in 1935–36, McCabe did not represent his state. However, he was made vice-captain to Vic Richardson for the tour, with Woodfull and Ponsford having retired, and Bradman ill. McCabe enjoyed more success, heading the Test batting figures with 420 runs at 84.00. After scoring 24, 65 and 29 in three warm-up matches, all of which were won by innings, McCabe hit 149 in the First Test at Durban, sharing a second-wicket partnership of 161 with Bill Brown in gale-force conditions which caused balls to make U-turns in the headwind, forced the umpires to glue the bails to the wickets using chewing gum, to set up a nine-wicket victory. In the following Test in Johannesburg, McCabe made 34 as Australia took a first innings lead of 93. However, Dudley Nourse scored 235 to help the hosts to 491; McCabe removed Nourse and ended with 2/30. Australia were set a Test world record target of 399 in the second innings to achieve victory on a turning wicket, and McCabe told captain Richardson that he would not be able to bat or run between wickets effectively because of altitude sickness. Regarding McCabe was his most important batsman, Richardson implored him to bat and told him to simply stand his ground and hit boundaries so that he would not have to run. McCabe joined Fingleton at 1/17 before taking the score to 1/85 by the end of the third day. The following morning in poor visibility on a wicket with irregular bounce and lateral deviation, McCabe resumed on 38 and scored a century in the morning session to reach lunch at 138, after Fingleton was dismissed at 2/194. The pair had put on 177 runs for the second wicket, and McCabe had done more than four fifths of the scoring. McCabe had reached his century in only 90 minutes, and continued on despite a storm that brought low dust clouds and hindered visibility, and increasingly irregular bounce and cut off the pitch. Midway through the afternoon, dark clouds gathered, along with thunderstorms and lightning, but this had no effect on the batsman. McCabe pushed the score to 2/274, and with only 125 runs needed with half the day remaining, Australia were on course to meet the target, having already scored 189 in the first half. However, Herbie Wade, the South African captain made an unprecedented appeal against the light due fear "for the fieldsmen's safety" in the face of McCabe's aggressive batting. He finished unbeaten on 189, an innings described by Fingleton as "bordering on miraculous". McCabe struck 24 fours, and was productive square of the wicket, hitting numerous cut shots past point. Fingleton further added that "McCabe never put a foot or his bat in a false position", and that he "pulverized the South African attack into the dust". McCabe was unable to maintain such a standard of performance in the remaining three Tests; he scored a duck, 40 and one, as Australia won each by an innings. He ended the series with three wickets at 45.33. However, he scored consecutive centuries in the tour matches, adding 115 and 112 against Border and Orange Free State.

== Tension with Bradman? ==
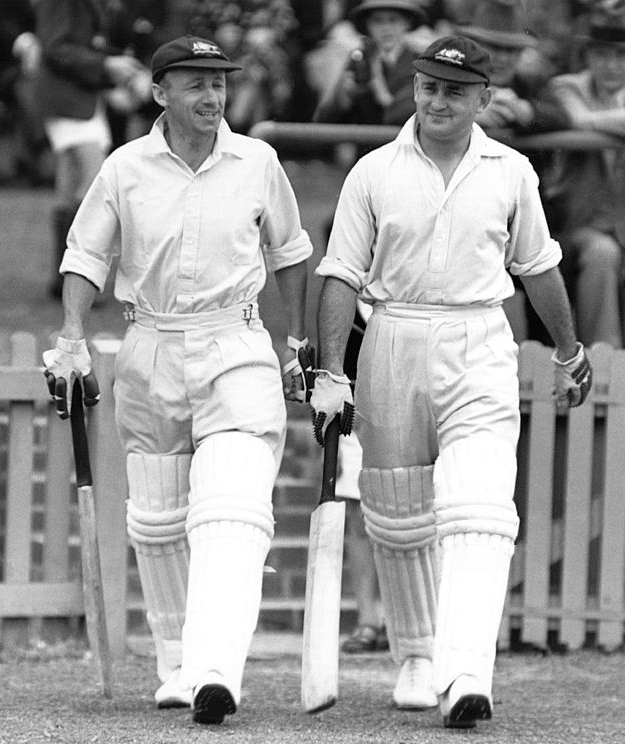
Bradman and McCabe (right) in 1938

The following year, having been appointed Bradman's vice-captain, McCabe had a successful Ashes series in 1936–37. McCabe scored 76, 28, 23, 83 and 46 in the lead-up, but started the series poorly; he made 51 in the first innings but managed only seven as Australia was caught out on a sticky wicket on the final day and were bowled out for 58 to lose the First Test in Brisbane by 322 runs. He then made a duck as Australia was again caught on a sticky by a thunderstorm during the first innings of the Second Test in Sydney. He made 93 in the second innings but Australia was unable to overcome the first innings deficit of 346 after being forced to follow on and fell to an innings defeat.

After the Second Test, McCabe was involved in an infamous incident that has caused speculation ever since. His captain Bradman was known for his reserved personality, did not drink and often eschewed social activities with teammates, preferring to privately listen to music or read. Combined with his success, Bradman gained a reputation for cockiness. In the 1930s, Australia had been divided along sectarian lines, with a sizeable Irish Catholic minority that included McCabe often pitted against Anglicans and/or Protestants such as Bradman (of Anglo-Irish descent), particularly practitioners of Freemasonry, leading to speculation that the tension was fuelled by religion. Four of the five Catholics in the team, McCabe, leading bowler Bill O'Reilly, along with Leo O'Brien and Chuck Fleetwood-Smith were summoned by the Board of Control to respond to allegations that they were undermining Bradman. Bradman denied having prior knowledge of the meeting, although the alleged infighting was reported in the press. Opening batsman Jack Fingleton was not invited, speculated to be due to his journalistic background, but Bradman later alleged that he was the ringleader. After that, Bradman's relationship with O'Reilly and Fingleton never recovered. During the meeting, players were variously accused of undermining Bradman's authority, laziness, lack of attention to fitness, but the board refused to specifically accuse those summoned. The details were leaked to the media, but the board denied that the meeting had taken place. Bradman denied that he was anti-Catholic, saying that O'Reilly and Fingleton wanted to depose him from the captaincy and install McCabe in his place.

Australia were now 0–2 down and needed to win three Tests in a row to retain the Ashes. The pressure on McCabe increased when last-minute injuries meant that he had to open the bowling. McCabe made 63 and 22 and took a wicket as Australia won their first match in the series. He then top-scored with 88 in Australia's first innings of 288 and made 55 in the second as Australia won by 148 runs in the Fourth Test in Adelaide to level the series. In the deciding Test at the MCG, McCabe scored 112, one of three centuries as Australia amassed 604, a record score in Ashes Tests in Australia. This laid the platform for the innings victory that retained the Ashes. McCabe aggregated 491 runs in five Tests at 54.55, with a century and five fifties in a consistent display.

McCabe assumed the New South Wales captaincy from the 1936–37 season onwards. Due to international commitments, McCabe was represented his state only three times, but they were undefeated, winning both of their matches against England. McCabe scored a fifty in each of the matches.

In 1937–38, no international matches were scheduled, and McCabe played a full season with New South Wales, leading them to the Sheffield Shield title, with three wins and three draws. He started the Shield season with consecutive centuries against Queensland and South Australia, and finished with 83 and 122 in two warm-up matches for Australia before they departed for England. McCabe totalled 720 runs at 45.00 for the season, with three centuries and three fifties, and took eight wickets at 24.62.

== International farewell ==
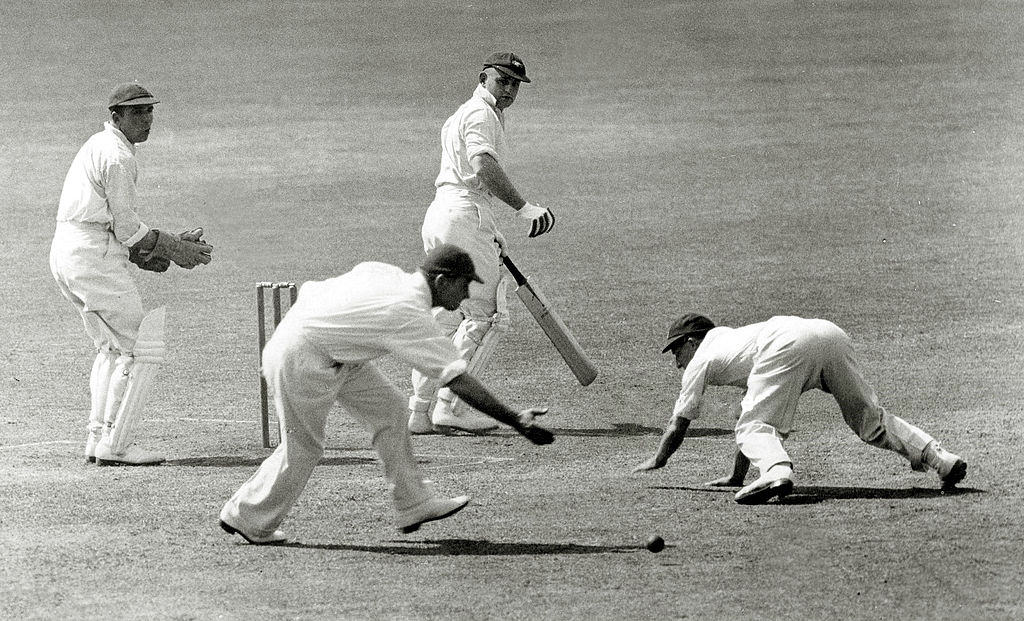
First Test at Trent Bridge, Nottingham, 14 June 1938. Match drawn during 2nd innings, McCabe edges a ball from England's Verity, past the slip fielders Hammond and Edrich. McCabe scored 232 runs in the first innings.

The 1938 Ashes Tour of England was McCabe's last for Australia. He was again appointed vice-captain for the tour. In the second tour match, McCabe scored 110 in an innings win over Oxford University. His 50 against Essex in the final match before the Tests was the only other fifty in the first nine matches, in which he scored 301 runs at 37.62. He took a total of 4/50 in an innings win over Northamptonshire. McCabe's lean run with the bat was causing concern for the Australians, as the other batsmen had been productive.

McCabe's most highly rated innings came in the First Test at Trent Bridge. England compiled 8/658 before declaring late on the second day, and McCabe had toiled for 21 overs without success. McCabe arrived at the crease with the dismissal of Bradman at 2/111 to join Brown, and after two unsuccessful appeals against the light, he was 19 at the close of play after 35 minutes of batting with the total at 3/138, having seen Brown dismissed for 48. McCabe had struck three boundaries by this stage, two cut shots and an on drive, and had survived a final spell from fast bowler Ken Farnes without a sightscreen, accompanied by nightwatchman Frank Ward.

The next morning, England's bowlers continued to make regular inroads. Ward fell in the third over of the day, and the debutant Lindsay Hassett was dismissed soon after, leaving Australia at 5/150. McCabe, who had hit two boundaries thus far in the morning, was joined by Jack Badcock. The former continued to score boundaries regularly, and hit Sinfield for four and three from a leg glance and late cut to reach his 50 in 90 minutes. He then hit Hammond for consecutive on-driven fours before Badcock fell at 6/194, having made only 9 of the 43 runs in their partnership. McCabe had struck 62 of the 83 runs added since he had come to the crease. With all the other specialist batsmen dismissed, McCabe was now batting with wicket-keeper Ben Barnett and began to attack the English bowlers with powerful drives and hook shots. Hammond brought back Farnes to try and finish off the tail, but McCabe responded by hitting three fours in one over, forcing the English captain to remove his fast bowler after McCabe had hooked him for six.

Despite Hammond's best attempts, McCabe was able to gain the strike and runs came quickly. McCabe reached his century in 140 minutes and England declined to take the new ball while he was batting. By lunch, he and Barnett had added 67 in only 50 minutes, although the latter had made only 20 of these; the total was 6/261, with McCabe on 105. Having reached his century, McCabe lifted his scoring rate, scoring his last 132 runs in 95 minutes. Boundaries came much more readily and he took 44 runs from a three over spell by leg spinner Doug Wright. As he ran out of partners, he became more aggressive; in the last ten overs of his innings, he took 80% of the strike and hit 16 boundaries. He was the last man out, attempting to loft the spin of Verity, after a final wicket partnership with Leslie Fleetwood-Smith of 77 in 28 minutes, of which he scored 72. He finished with 232 from 235 minutes with 34 boundaries and one six, an innings in which Bradman summoned his players not to miss a ball, as "they would never see anything like it again." Bradman later said that McCabe "held us all spellbound", and it was reported that the Australian captain trembled while watching the innings. While McCabe was at the crease, his partners contributed a total of only 58 runs, meaning that he had outscored them by a ratio of 4:1. Upon his return to the pavilion Bradman greeted him with the words: "If I could play an innings like that, I'd be a proud man, Stan". This has also been reported as Bradman saying " I wish I could bat like that". Bradman later wrote that "Towards the end [of McCabe's innings] I could scarcely watch the play. My eyes filled as I drank in the glory of his shots". It was regarded by English captains Arthur Gilligan and Bob Wyatt to be the best innings that they had ever witnessed, as did former England bowler Sydney Barnes—regarded as one of the best of all time—who said that he would not have been able to stop McCabe. Neville Cardus said that the innings was one of the greatest in Test history. Wisden reported that McCabe played "an innings the equal of which has probably never been seen in the history of Test cricket; for the best part of four hours he maintained a merciless punishment of the bowling". McCabe's biographer Jack McHarg said that the innings "was a sort of encyclopedia of attacking batsmanship, a triumph of character, technique and judgement". Cardus said

Now came death and glory, brilliance wearing the dress of culture. McCabe demolished the English attack with aristocratic politeness, good taste and reserve. He cut and drove, upright and lissome; his perfection of touch moved the aesthetic sense; this was the cricket of felicity, power and no covetousness, strength and no brutality, assault and no battery, dazzling strokes and no rhetoric; lovely brave batsmanship, giving joy to the connoisseur…One of the greatest innings ever seen anywhere in any period…he is in the line of Trumper and no other batsman today but McCabe has inherited Trumper's sword and cloak.

The innings was not enough to avert the follow on, and in the second innings, McCabe made 39 as Australia made 6/427 and the match petered into a draw. After the Test, McCabe scored 79 and took a total of 4/20 in a victory over the Gentlemen of England.

McCabe followed his efforts at Trent Bridge with 38 and 21 in the drawn Second Test at Lord's. He bowled heavily in the match, sending down 43 overs and taking a total of 2/144 as Bradman's specialist bowlers struggled to make inroads. In the first two Tests, McCabe had taken a combined total of 2/208 from 64 overs. The Third Test at Old Trafford was abandoned before it started due to rain, and McCabe contributed only one and 15 as Australia scrambled to a five-wicket win to retain the Ashes in the low-scoring Fourth Test at Headingley after chasing a target of 105 on the third day. It was part of a three-week run in which McCabe failed to pass 15 in six innings and did not take a wicket. McCabe made fifties in the two first-class matches before the Fifth and final Test at The Oval, where Australia played an extra batsman, meaning that McCabe opened the bowling. He took 0/85 from 38 overs, and with Bradman and Fingleton injuring themselves during the match, McCabe was left in control of a nine-man team. England piled on 7/903 declared in three days before defeating Australia by an innings and 579 runs, the largest winning margin in Test history. This included a world record score of 364 by Len Hutton, who was dropped by wicket-keeper Ben Barnett from McCabe's bowling before reaching 50. Neither Bradman nor Fingleton were able to bat. McCabe made 14 and two, and finished the series with 362 runs at 45.25. McCabe scored 91 and 58 in tour matches against an England XI and the Leveson-Gower's XI to finish the English summer.

McCabe's Test career ended after the tour at just 28 years of age, due to a combination of chronic foot injuries and the intervention of World War II—England's scheduled 1940–41 tour never materialised and international cricket did not resume until 1946. McCabe had also been in poor form apart from his double century at Trent Bridge and there was speculation that he was in decline. His feet had high insteps that meant that when he stood normally, his toes would not touch the floor. Curiously, none of his three most celebrated innings at Trent Bridge, Johannesburg nor Sydney resulted in an Australian victory. O'Reilly said that "All three of them were the greatest innings I have watched".

Upon returning to Australia, McCabe continued to captain New South Wales, but only played in two matches during the 1938–39 season due to illness, scoring 141 runs at 47.00 including one century. In the first match, to celebrate the centenary of the Melbourne Cricket Club, he struck 105 in only 140 minutes and timed the ball well, but made 35 and 1 in the first Shield match and then absented himself from the rest of the season. McCabe had always been susceptible to illness and was dogged for much of 1938 and 1939. In his absence, New South Wales surrendered their title to South Australia, but they regained the mantle in 1939–40 upon the return of their captain. In his first match back, McCabe scored 98 to guide New South Wales to a three-wicket win over Queensland. After losing their next two matches, McCabe's men won their last three matches to take the title. The captain scored 59 and 55 and 49 and 114 in the last two matches against South Australia and Victoria respectively. A match between the Shield champions and the Rest of Australia was arranged and McCabe scored 72 and 96, steering his team to a narrow two-wicket win. He ended the season with 699 runs at 53.76 from seven matches, with a century and six fifties.

The 1940–41 was to be McCabe's last full season, although the Shield competition was not held and matches stood alone. This was unfortunate for McCabe and his men, as they won all five of their matches. McCabe scored 88 and 57 as New South Wales scraped past Queensland by 27 runs in the season opening match, before scoring 53 in the runchase as his team defeated a combined Queensland and Victorian team by only one wicket. McCabe added two further half-centuries and ended the season with a win over arch-rivals Victoria. He had scored 432 runs at 48.00. Due to the outbreak of World War II in Europe in September 1939, the scheduled England tour of Australia was cancelled.

In 1941–42, McCabe played his final first-class match. He scored 8 and 41 as Queensland took a 17-run win. Ten days later, the Japanese attacked Pearl Harbor, prompting the start of the war in the Pacific. With that, first-class cricket was cancelled and did not resume until 1945–46, ending McCabe's career at the age of just 31. He had 24 wins and four losses in 38 first-class matches as captain for all teams. In his last three seasons, McCabe took only one wicket, from 18 overs of bowling.

== Style and character ==
Australian teammate Clarrie Grimmett, regarded as one of the greatest spinners of all time, regarded McCabe as technically superior to Bradman, feeling that the latter's success was largely due to his extreme concentration and determination. Fellow state and Australian batsman Bill Brown described McCabe as the "finest strokeplayer I ever saw", further adding "When Stan was in command, he was so magnificent to watch, and he left everyone, including Bradman, for dead. Certainly Bradman scored more runs, but Stan was the batsman you most wanted to be."

The leading English batsman Hutton said that McCabe had several qualities in his batsmanship that were superior to those of Bradman, concluding that "It would be harder to think of a greater Australian batsman". The leading English cricket writer Neville Cardus said that "Genial, friendly, Stan was Australia's most gallant and knightly batsman since Victor Trumper. In his brilliant strokeplay there was a certain courtliness. In his most aggressive innings, there was no brutality; his bat was never used as a bludgeon." E. W. Swanton said that McCabe was from "the heroic mould" and that "like those of Hobbs, Macartney and Woolley were essentially qualitative" and that McCabe "came as near as any player to one's conception of the perfect cricketer".

The leading Australian cricket writer of the time, Ray Robinson said that "In McCabe the cricketer, you saw McCabe the man—urbane, sociable, unpretentious, straightforward, incapable of anything mean-spirited. In all the pre-war Test series he was the best liked by both his own team and his opponents."

== Later years and family life ==
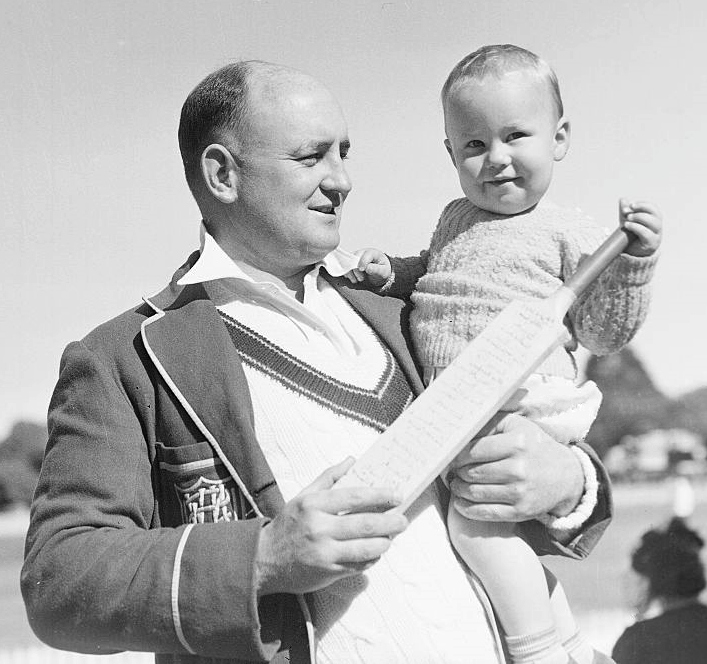
McCabe with son Geoffrey in 1940

McCabe was briefly a member of the Australian Defence Force during the Second World War, joining in late 1942. Due to his poor health and feet, he knew that his utility would be limited, and he also had a newborn son and fledgling business at the time, so he had not rushed to enlist at the start of the war. Due to McCabe's incapacitation, he was given a clerical job at the Victoria Barracks. He stayed in the role for 12 months before his feet problems resulted in an early discharge. He was appointed to serve on the Sydney Sports Ground and Cricket Ground Trust and operated a sports store in George Street, Sydney from its opening until his death. McCabe often hired cricketing colleagues as salesmen; his close friend O'Reilly worked there in the late-1930s, as did paceman Ray Lindwall after the war, Lindwall opted to work for McCabe because he was offered leave to travel overseas for Test tours.

McCabe ran for an administrative position with his local club Mosman after his retirement, but was defeated, so he never had an opportunity to serve with the NSWCA. After the end of his first-class career, McCabe became a keen recreational golfer, but stopped playing in the mid-1950s due to his foot problems and other health issues. In 1956–57, McCabe and O'Reilly were given a testimonial match by the New South Wales Cricket Association. The match was between Harvey's XI and Lindwall's XI and acted as a trial for the non-Test tour of New Zealand. The match raised 7,500 pounds, which was split between McCabe and O'Reilly, and would have bought two average-sized homes in Sydney at the time.

McCabe married Edna May Linton on 5 February 1935 at St Mary's Cathedral, Sydney, and the couple had two children, a son and a daughter, born in 1939 and 1950 respectively. The devout McCabe sent both of his children to Catholic boarding schools even though the family home was nearby. Plagued by ill-health in his middle age, McCabe's fitness was further hindered by his feet, which prevented him from exercising. He thus gained a lot of weight, and heavy smoking wore down his body, as did the large number of people who wanted to meet him. McCabe weakened significantly in the last two years of his life and was hospitalised for a period for liver problems. He was released from hospital soon before his death, but still aged 58, was a very frail man who moved very tentatively.

== Death and legacy ==
McCabe died of a skull fracture after falling from a cliff at his home in Mosman, New South Wales after attempting to dispose of a dead possum. He had earlier told Dwyer of his plan to clean out his backyard, and was told to rest, but did so anyway, falling down and rolling off the steep slope in his backyard and over the ledge of the cliff abutting the rear of his house. There was innuendo that McCabe had actually committed suicide, with O'Reilly musing "He had despatched the possum, but had gone overboard with it!". However, the coroner ruled that the death was accidental and his family strongly denied that he had chosen to end his life. The coroner's investigation noted that McCabe's hands had tufts of ripped grass in them, indicating that he had tried to grab onto vegetation in a vain attempt to stop his fall.

News of McCabe's death was made public while Australia and England were playing in the Fifth Test at The Oval. After the death was announced over the public address system, the crowd spontaneously stood up and took off their hats, as did the players, and they observed a self-initiated moment of silence. However, McCabe's friend and former teammate Fingleton, now a journalist, criticised the Australian team for not wearing black armbands.

McCabe was buried in Northern Suburbs cemetery. In 1977, the Stan McCabe Sporting Complex was opened in Grenfell as part of the new high school, and the oval was named in his honour. The complex included grounds and facilities for a number of sports. He was inducted into the Australian Cricket Hall of Fame in 2002. In June 2021, he was inducted into the ICC Cricket Hall of Fame as one of the special inductees to mark the inaugural edition of the ICC World Test Championship final.

== Test match performance ==
		Batting				Bowling			
Opposition	Matches	Runs	Average	High Score	100 / 50	Runs	Wickets	Average	Best (Inns)
England	24	1,931	48.27	232	4/10	1,076	21	51.23	4/41
South Africa	10	621	56.45	189*	2/2	341	12	28.41	4/13
West Indies	5	196	32.66	90	0/1	126	3	42.00	1/16
Overall	39	2,748	48.21	232	6/13	1,543	36	42.86	4/13
