= Walter Buswell (cricketer) =

English cricketer

Walter Alfred Buswell (1875–1950) was an English cricketer who played for Northamptonshire between 1906 and 1921. He was born in Welford, Northamptonshire on 12 January 1875 and died in Swinford, Leicestershire on 24 April 1950. He appeared in 205 first-class matches as a wicketkeeper and right-handed batsman. He scored 2,670 runs with a highest score of 101 not out, his only century, and claimed 402 victims including 116 stumpings.
