= Hans Ebeling =

Australian cricketer (1905–1980)

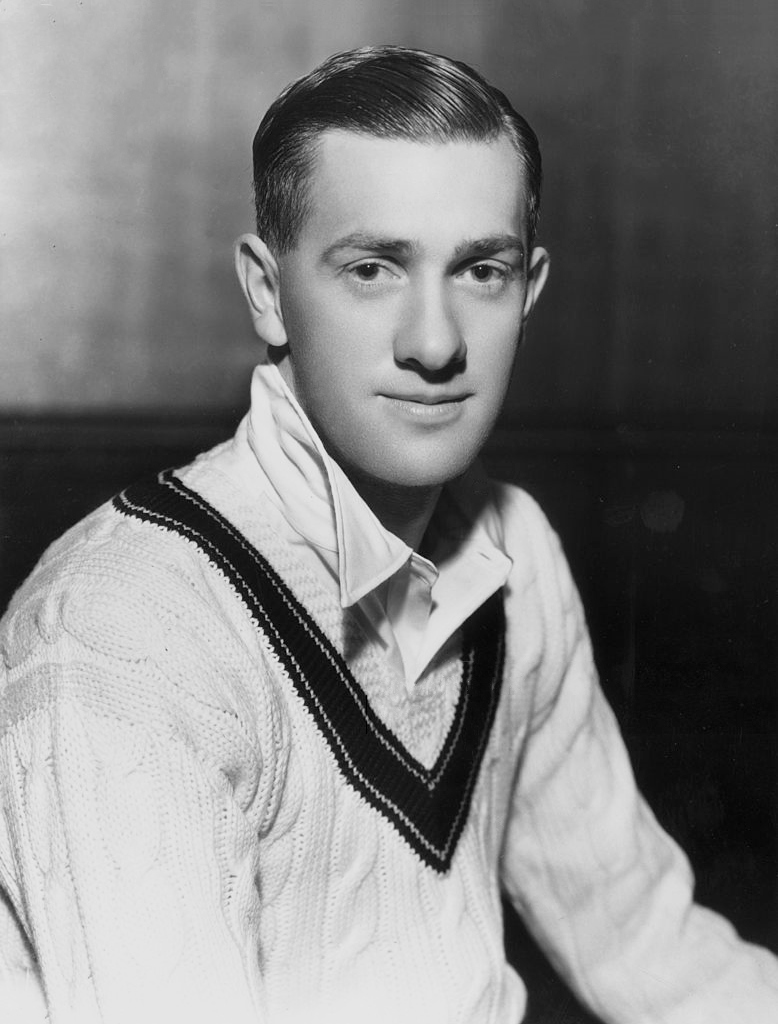
- Ebeling in 1934

Personal information
- Born: 1 January 1905; Avoca, Victoria, Australia
- Died: 12 January 1980 (aged 75); Bentleigh East, Victoria, Australia
- Batting: Right-handed
- Bowling: Right arm fast-medium
- Role: Allrounder

International information
- National side: Australia
- Only Test (cap 152): 18 August 1934 v England

Career statistics
Competition	Test	First-class
Matches	1	73
Runs scored	43	1,005
Batting average	21.50	14.15
100s/50s	0/0	0/3
Top score	41	76
Balls bowled	55	16,085
Wickets	3	217
Bowling average	29.66	26.58
5 wickets in innings	0	7
10 wickets in match	0	2
Best bowling	3/74	7/33
Catches/stumpings	0/–	38/–
- Source: CricInfo, 30 December 2021

Hans Irvine Ebeling MBE (1 January 1905 – 12 January 1980) was an Australian cricketer and cricket administrator.

== Family ==
Ebeling's father, Arthur John Claus Frederick Ebeling (1863-1910), was of German descent. His mother was Mary Grace Ebeling (1869-1948), née Mochett, Hans Irvine Ebeling was born in Avoca, Victoria on 1 January 1905.

He married Myra Aileen Conry on 5 October 1936.

== Education ==
Ebeling was educated at Caulfield Grammar School from 1919 to 1922, where he played cricket in the school's First XI, football (in the ruck, and at centre half-forward) in its First XVIII, and as a miler in its athletic team.

He dead-heated (with J. Manning of Camberwell Grammar) for first place in the open mile race at the combined Associated Grammar School Sports meeting on 4 November 1921. In one match, against Camberwell Grammar in June 1922, he kicked 13 goals.

The association of parents who support school cricket at Caulfield Grammar is named after him. He is the only Caulfield Grammarian to have played Test cricket.

== Cricket ==
He captained Victoria to two Sheffield Shield championships in four years (1934 and 1938), captained the Melbourne Cricket Club (MCC) to four premierships, and played in his sole Test match against England in 1934.

A Squadron-Leader in World War II, he served as a member of the board of the MCC—a body which oversees not only the club's sporting teams but also the operations of the Melbourne Cricket Ground (MCG)—for 45 years and was serving his first year as MCC President when he died. During this time, he helped to organise the 1977 Centenary Test between England and Australia at the MCG.

In 1999, the Melbourne Cricket Club selected him in its Team of the Century.

== Military service ==
He served with the RAAF during World War II.

== Death ==
He died at East Bentleigh on 12 January 1980 aged 75.
