= Trent Bridge =

Cricket ground in West Bridgford, Nottinghamshire, England

Coordinates: 52°56′13″N 1°07′56″W

Trent Bridge Cricket Ground

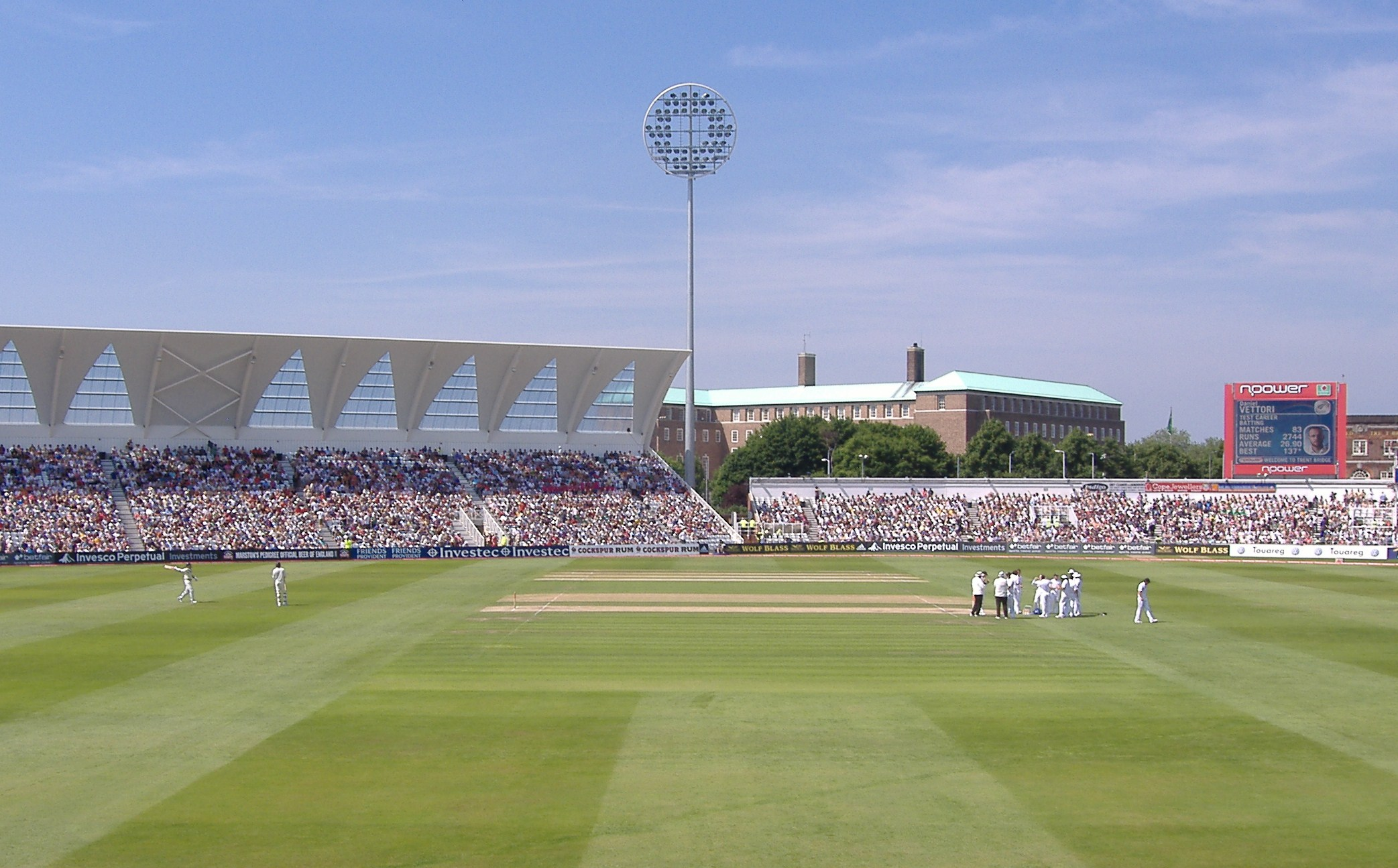
- Interactive map of Trent Bridge Cricket Ground

Ground information
- Location: West Bridgford, Nottinghamshire, England
- Country: England
- Capacity: 17,500
- Tenants: Nottinghamshire County Cricket Club (1841–present); England cricket team (1899–present); Notts County F.C. (1873–1877, 1894–1910)
- End names
- Radcliffe Road End Stuart Broad End

International information
- First men's Test: 1–3 June 1899: England v Australia
- Last men's Test: 25–29 June 2026: England v New Zealand
- First men's ODI: 31 August 1974: England v Pakistan
- Last men's ODI: 19 September 2024: England v Australia
- First men's T20I: 6 June 2009: Bangladesh v India
- Last men's T20I: 14 September 2025: England v South Africa
- First women's Test: 23–25 June 1979: England v West Indies
- Last women's Test: 22–26 June 2023: England v Australia
- First women's ODI: 8 August 1976: England v Australia
- Last women's ODI: 22 June 2000: England v South Africa
- First women's T20I: 18 June 2009: India v New Zealand
- Last women's T20I: 28 June 2025: England v India

Team information
Nottinghamshire	(1841 – present)
- As of 28 June 2025; Source: CricInfo

Trent Bridge Cricket Ground is a cricket ground mostly used for Test, One-Day International and county cricket located in West Bridgford, Nottinghamshire, England, just across the River Trent from the city of Nottingham. Trent Bridge is also the headquarters of Nottinghamshire County Cricket Club. As well as international cricket and Nottinghamshire's home games, the ground has hosted the Finals Day of the Twenty20 Cup twice and has hosted One-Day Cup since 2021.

In 2009, the ground was used for the ICC World Twenty20 and hosted the semi-final between South Africa and Pakistan. The site takes its name from the nearby main bridge over the Trent and it is also close to Meadow Lane and the City Ground, the football stadiums of Notts County and Nottingham Forest respectively.

== History ==
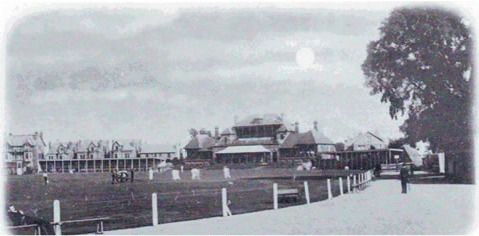
Trent Bridge circa 1890

Trent Bridge was first used as a cricket ground in the 1830s. The first recorded cricket match was held on an area of ground behind the Trent Bridge Inn in 1838. Trent Bridge hosted its first Test match in 1899, with England playing against Australia.

The ground was first opened in 1841 by William Clarke, husband of the proprietress of the Trent Bridge Inn and himself captain of William Clarke's All-England Eleven. He was commemorated in 1990 by the opening of the new William Clarke Stand, which incorporates the Rushcliffe Suite.

In 1950, an electronically operated scoreboard was installed at this venue, then the world's largest at any cricket stadium.

== Ground ==
Trent Bridge is considered to be one of the most beautiful grounds in world cricket. Its pavilion, retaining the architectural parameters of its 1889 foundation, is very well known in world cricket because it faces the wicket at an angle. Recent developments include the £7.2 million Radcliffe Road Cricket Centre, opened in 1998 and the state of the art £1.9 million Fox Road stand, which has received awards for its architectural excellence. The latter includes a modernistic aircraft-wing roof and was opened in 2002 despite a conflict with a small group of local residents over the lack of sunlight that this would cause to their properties.

Commencing in 2007, Trent Bridge has undergone redevelopment with the construction of a new stand to replace the Parr Stand and West Wing and the addition of one to five rows of extra seating at the front of several of the other stands. This increased capacity from 15,358 to 17,500, and the work was completed in time for the 2008 Test match against New Zealand. The stand was officially opened on 5 June by Prince Philip. The stand continued to be officially called the 'New Stand' for a number of years, also being referred to as the Bridgford Road Stand, before being renamed the Smith Cooper Stand in a sponsorship deal from March 2016. Following the end of this sponsorship, it is now officially known as the Bridgford Road Stand.

Bowling takes place from the Stuart Broad End (named the Pavilion End until September 2023 with the official renaming on 18 July 2024) and the Radcliffe Road End, with the wickets laid square of the Fox Road, William Clarke and Bridgford Road Stands.

== Gallery ==
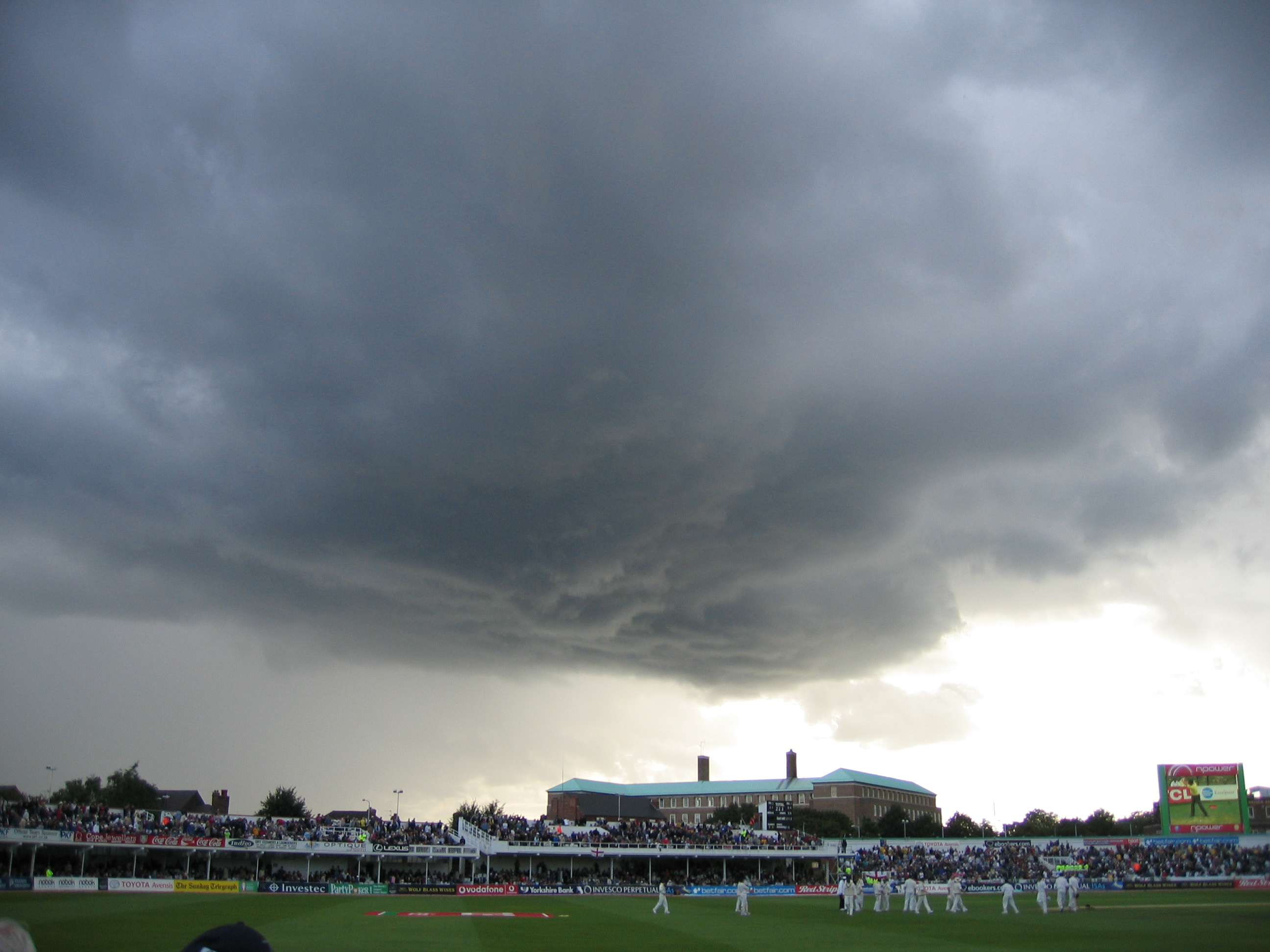
Rain clouds at Trent Bridge during the Ashes series 2005

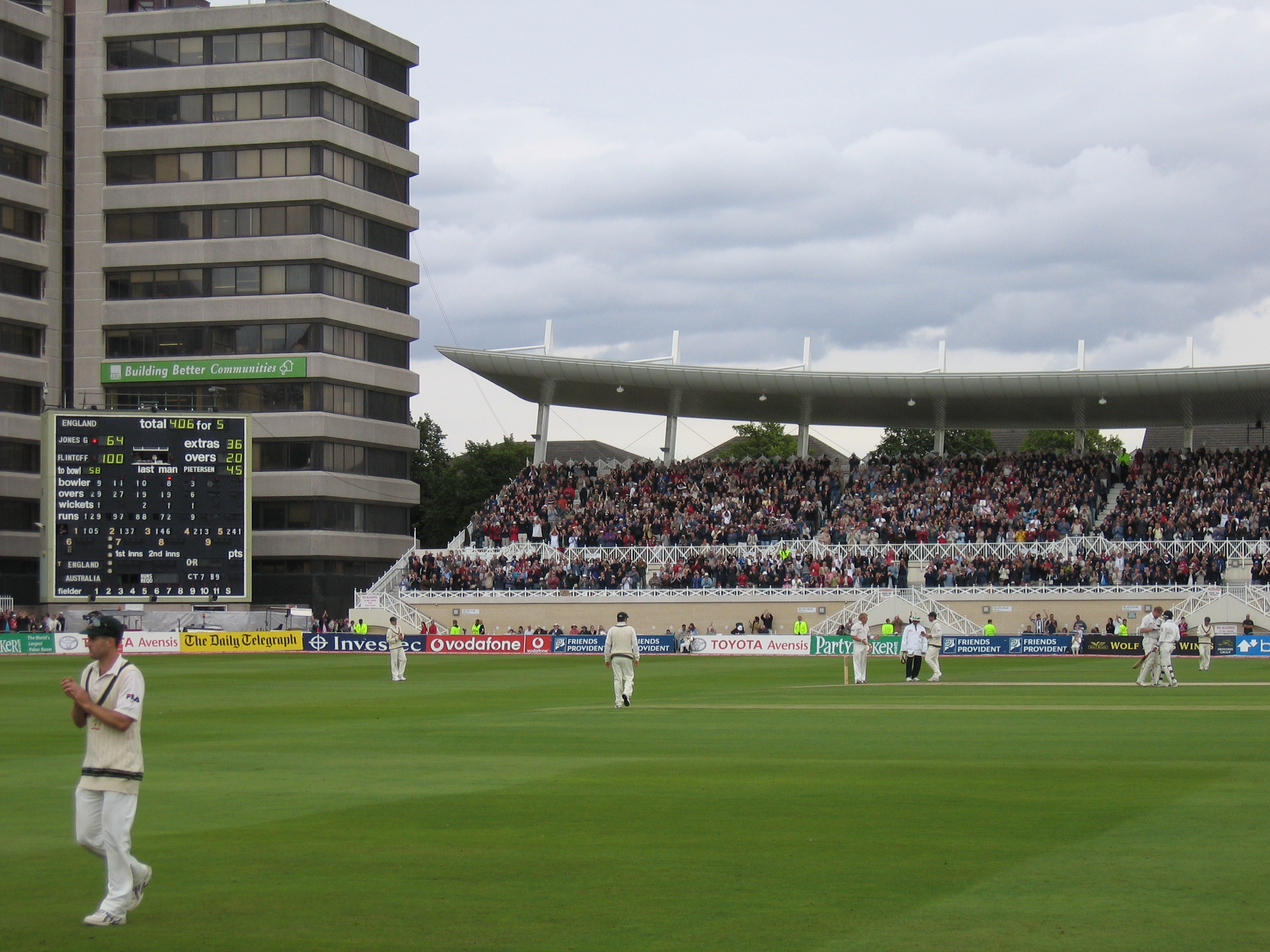
'Freddie' Flintoff reaches 100 in front of the Fox Road Stand

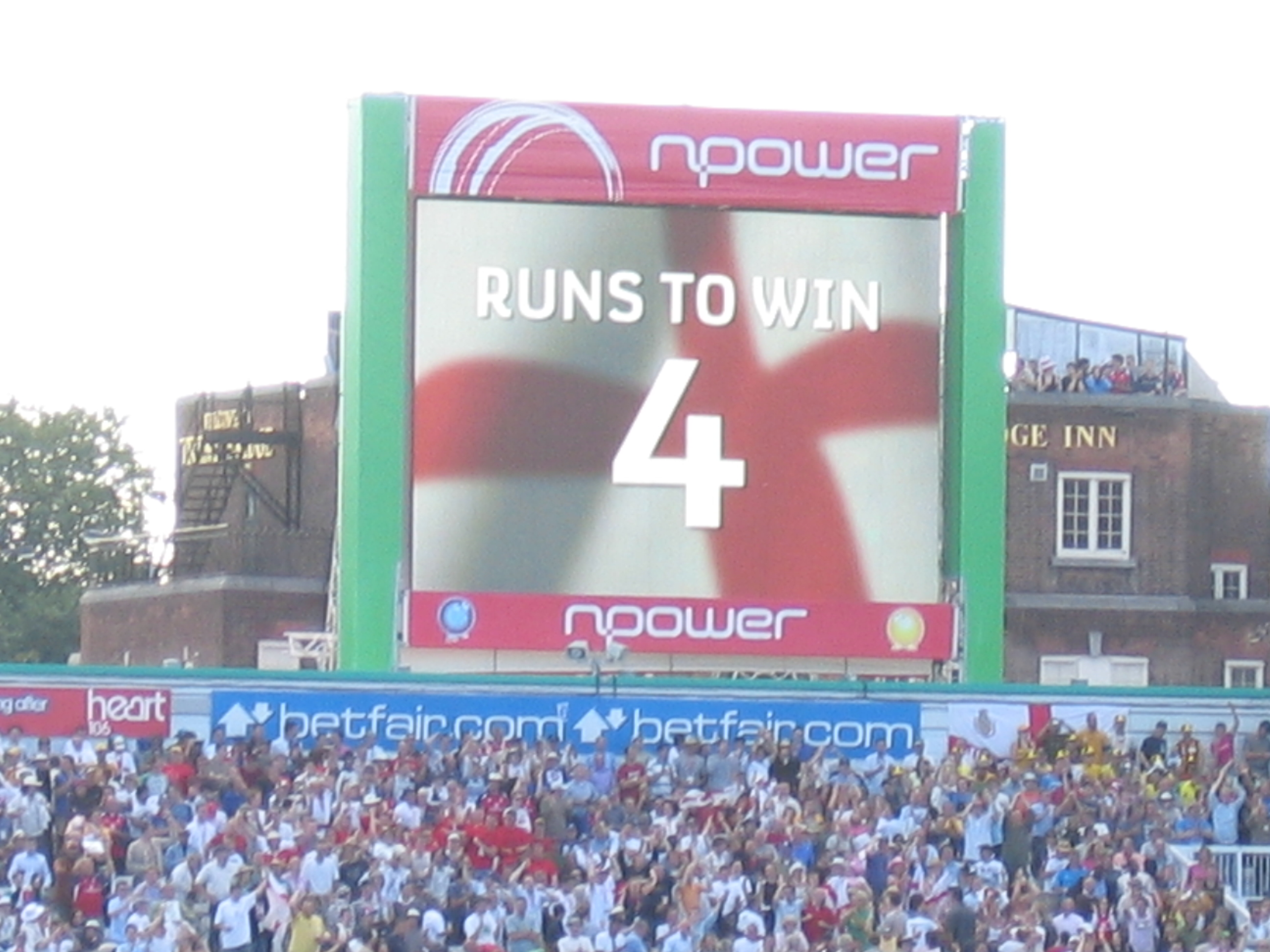
Fans celebrate in the William Clarke Stand, with England 4 runs from winning

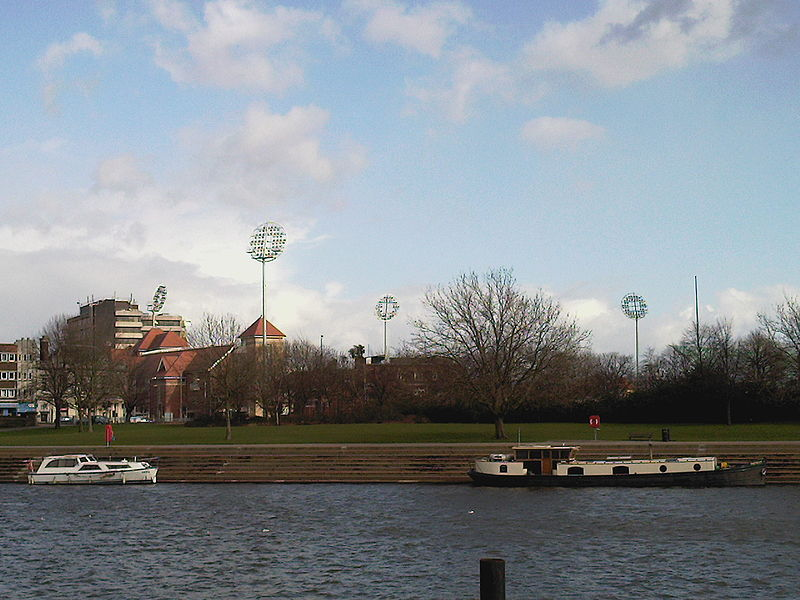
The new floodlights 2008

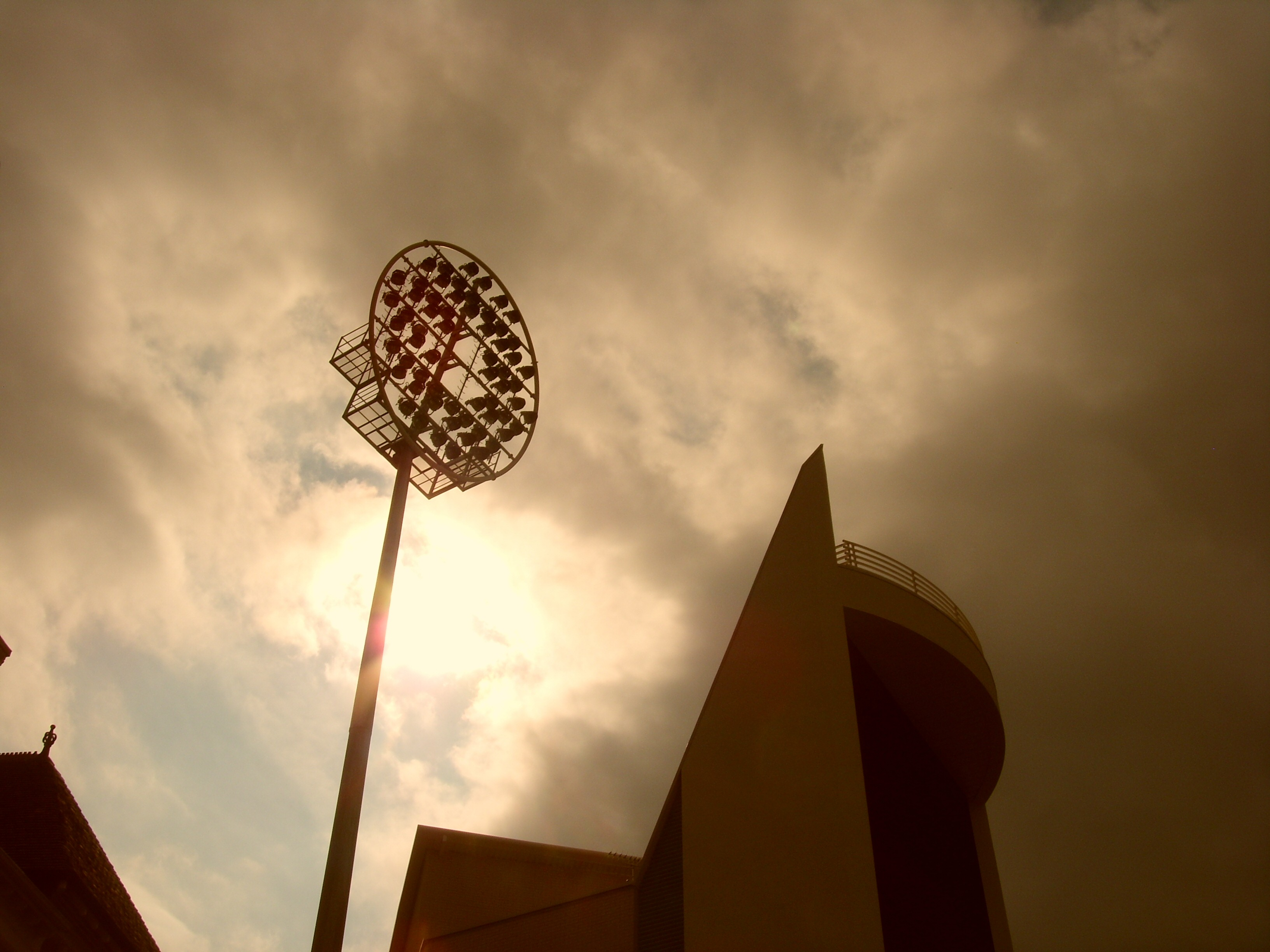
The new floodlights

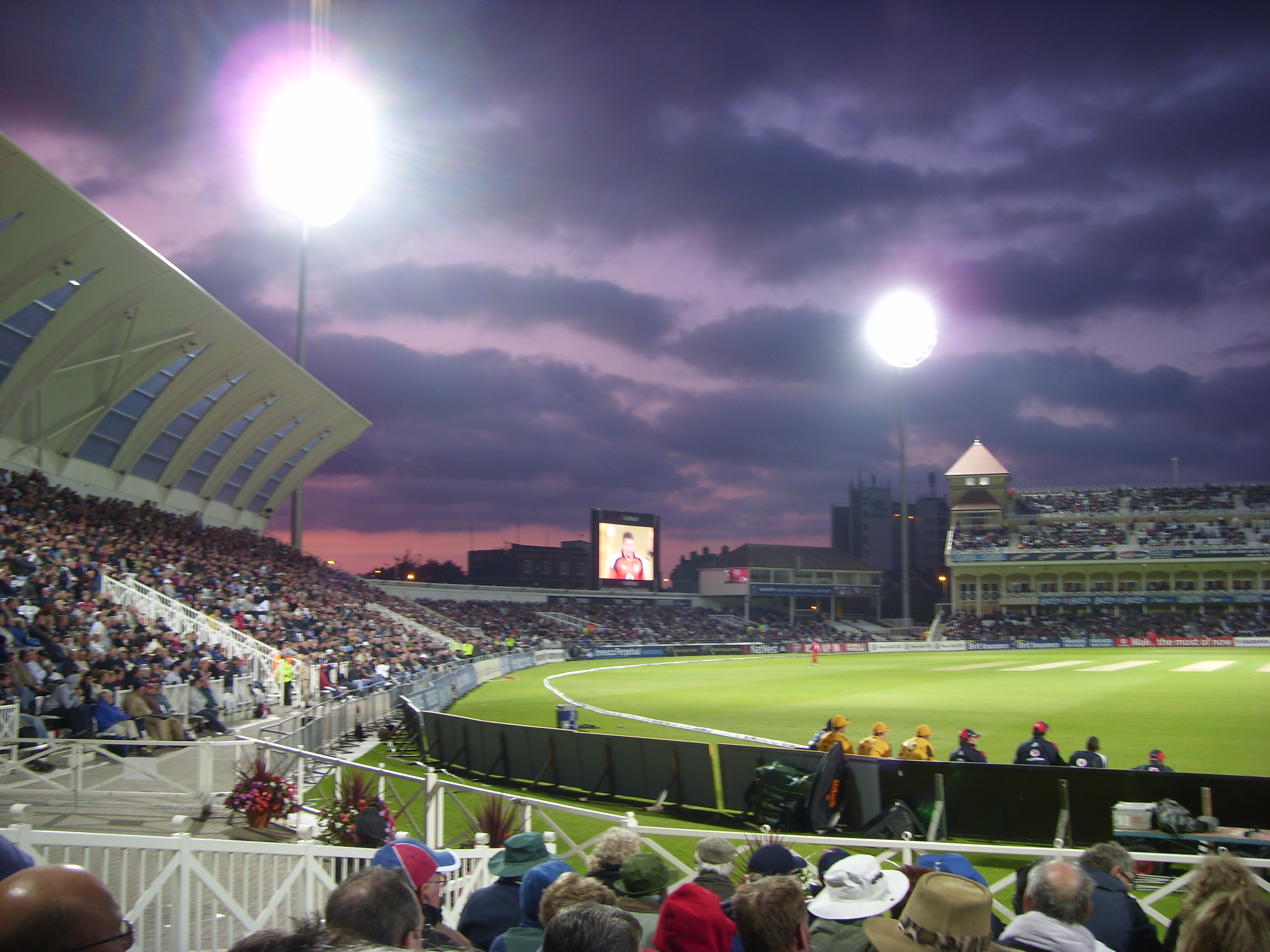
Floodlit match at Trent Bridge – England v. Australia 17 September 2009

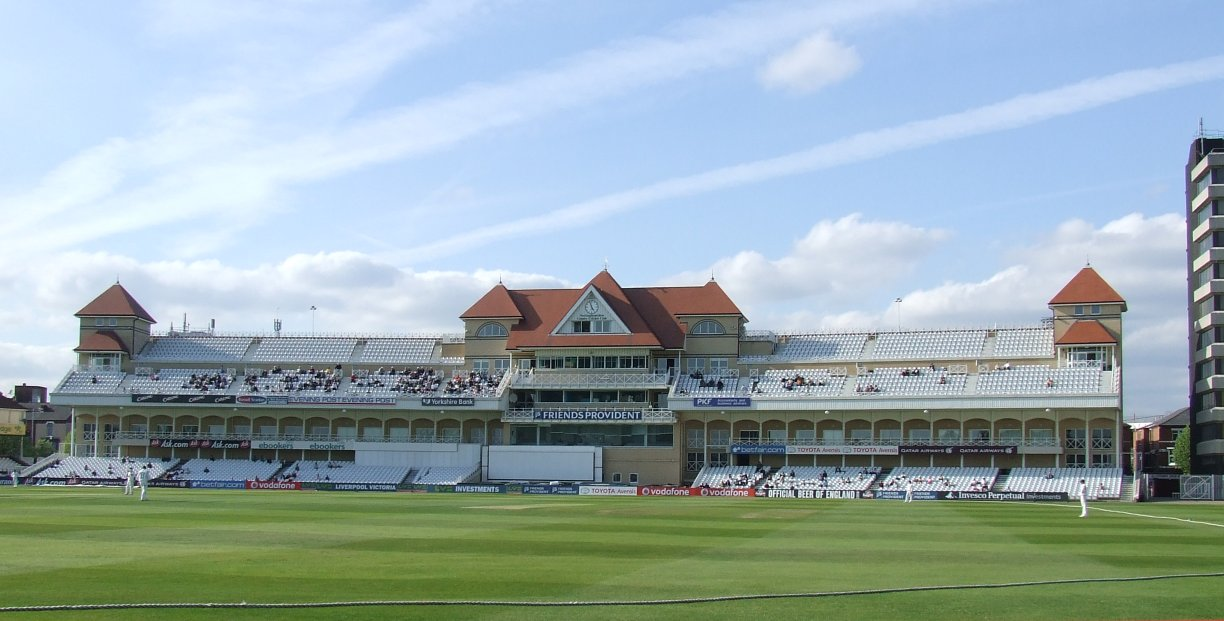
Radcliffe Road End, Trent Bridge

== Football ==
Trent Bridge has a history of hosting football matches. Notts County Football Club played their important games at the ground from the 1860s, and moved there permanently in 1883 when Nottingham Forest left. However, games early and late in the season had to be played elsewhere due to the cricket and Notts County finally left in 1910, moving to Meadow Lane.

The ground also hosted an international match, England beating Ireland 6–0 on 20 February 1897.

== Test cricket records ==
Michael Atherton holds the record for most career runs at Trent Bridge.

=== Batting ===
Most career runs
Runs	Player	Period
1,083 (19 innings)	(England) Michael Atherton	1989–2001
956 (15 innings)	(England) Joe Root	2013–2025
955 (10 innings)	(England) Denis Compton	1938–1955
936 (17 innings)	(England) Graham Gooch	1978–1994
735 (11 innings)	(England) Tom Graveney	1953–1967

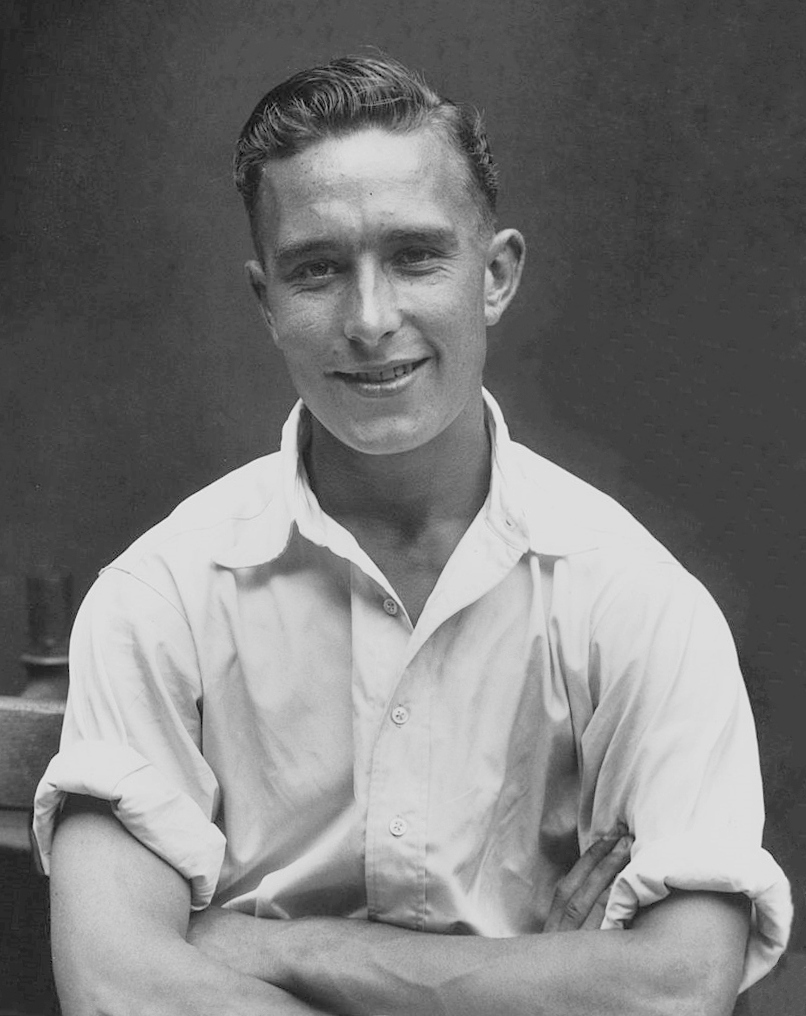
Denis Compton scored 278 against Pakistan in 1954, the record score at the ground.

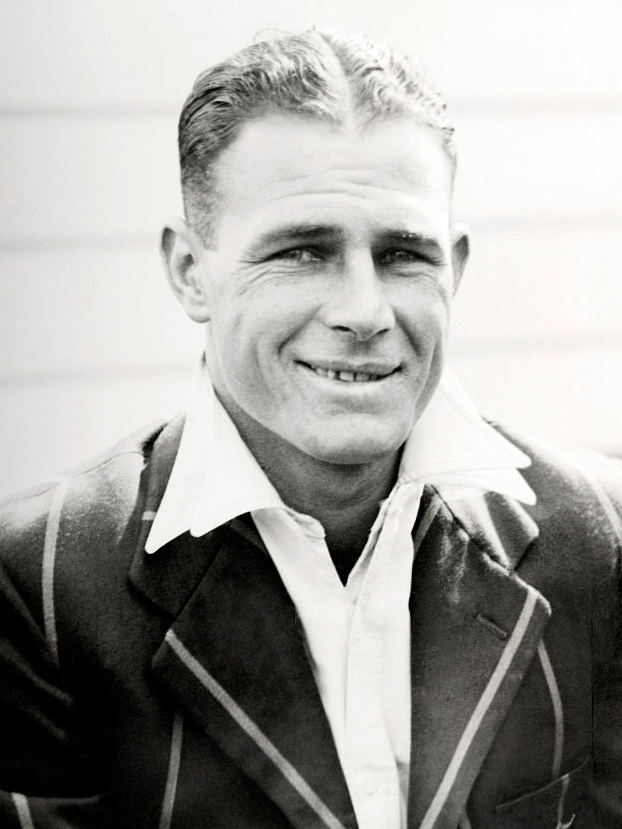
Dudley Nourse averaged 120.33 with the bat, the highest of any player with 3+ matches at the ground.

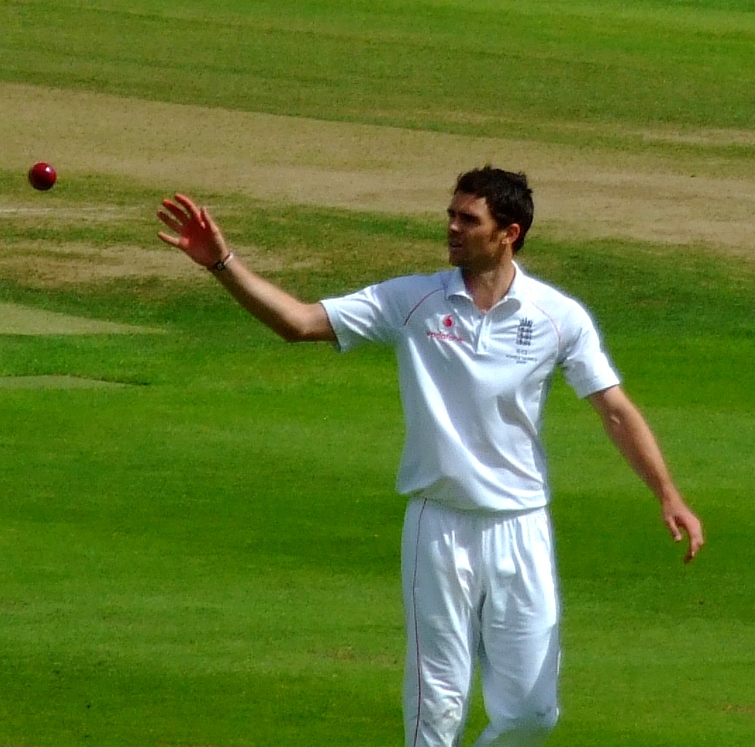
James Anderson has taken the most wickets at the ground, with 73.

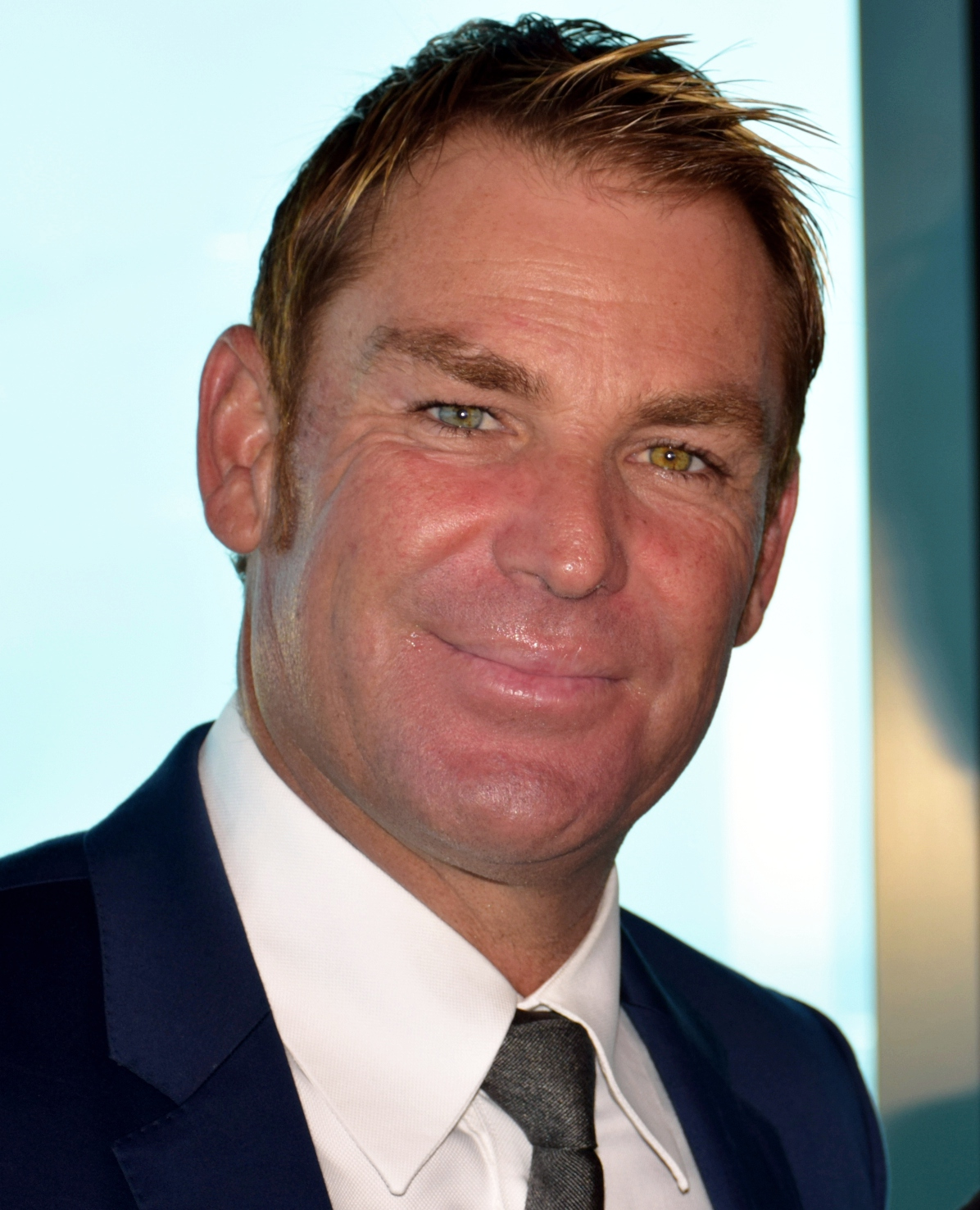
Shane Warne took 29 wickets at the ground, the most by a non-Englishman.

Most career runs (non-England)
Runs	Player	Period
567 (6 innings)	(Cricket West Indies) Viv Richards	1976–1991
541 (8 innings)	(India) Sachin Tendulkar	1996–2011
526 (8 innings)	(Australia) Don Bradman	1930–1948
477 (6 innings)	(Australia) Stan McCabe	1930–1938
468 (3 innings)	(Cricket West Indies) Frank Worrell	1950–1957

Highest individual scores
Runs	Player	Date
278 v. Pakistan	(England) Denis Compton	1 Jul 1954
261 v. England	(Cricket West Indies) Frank Worrell	20 Jul 1950
258 v. West Indies	(England) Tom Graveney	4 Jul 1957
232 v. England	(Australia) Stan McCabe	10 Jun 1938
232 v. England	(Cricket West Indies) Viv Richards	3 Jun 1976

Most centuries
Centuries	Player	Period
5 (10 innings)	(England) Denis Compton	1939–1955
5 (15 innings)	(England) Joe Root	2013–2025
5 (19 innings)	(England) Michael Atherton	1989–2001
3 (7 innings)	(England) Ollie Pope	2018–2025
3 (8 innings)	(Australia) Don Bradman	1930–1948
3 (11 innings)	(England) Tom Graveney	1953–1967
3 (17 innings)	(England) Graham Gooch	1978–1994

Highest batting average (3+ matches)
Average	Player	Period
120.33 (3 innings, 0 NO)	(South Africa) Dudley Nourse	1935–1951
95.50 (10 innings, 0 NO)	(England) Denis Compton	1939–1955
94.50 (6 innings, 0 NO)	(Cricket West Indies) Viv Richards	1976–1991
90.66 (9 innings, 3 NO)	(England) Graham Thorpe	1993–2004
86.40 (6 innings, 1 NO)	(India) Sourav Ganguly	1996–2007

=== Bowling ===
Most career wickets
Wickets	Player	Period
73 (24 innings)	(England) James Anderson	2003–2022
46 (22 innings)	(England) Stuart Broad	2008–2022
41 (12 innings)	(England) Alec Bedser	1947–1954
32 (10 innings)	(England) Fred Trueman	1957–1964
29 (8 innings)	(Australia) Shane Warne	1993–2005

Most career wickets (non-England)
Wickets	Player	Period
29 (8 innings)	(Australia) Shane Warne	1993–2005
24 (8 innings)	(New Zealand) Richard Hadlee	1973–1990
18 (4 innings)	(Australia) Clarrie Grimmett	1930–1934
16 (4 innings)	(Australia) Terry Alderman	1981–1989
16 (4 innings)	(India) Jasprit Bumrah	2018–2021

Best innings figures
Figures	Player	Date
8/15 v. Australia	(England) Stuart Broad	6 Aug 2015
8/70 v. England	(Sri Lanka) Muttiah Muralitharan	2 Jun 2006
8/107 v.Australia	(England) Bernard Bosanquet	29 May 1905
7/43 v. New Zealand	(England) James Anderson	5 Jun 2008
7/44 v. Australia	(England) Alec Bedser	11 Jun 1953
7/54 v. England	(Australia) Bill O'Reilly	8 Jun 1934
7/55 v. Australia	(England) Alec Bedser	11 Jun 1953
7/64 v. England	(Australia) Frank Laver	29 May 1905

Best match figures
Figures	Player	Date
14/99 v. Australia	(England) Alec Bedser	11 Jun 1953
11/71 v. Pakistan	(England) James Anderson	29 Jul 2010
11/129 v. England	(Australia) Bill O'Reilly	8 Jun 1934
11/132 v. England	(Sri Lanka) Muttiah Muralitharan	2 Jun 2006
10/87 v. England	(South Africa) Peter Pollock	5 Aug 1965
10/122 v. South Africa	(England) Angus Fraser	23 Jul 1998
10/140 v. England	(New Zealand) Richard Hadlee	7 Aug 1986
10/158 v. Australia	(England) James Anderson	10 Jul 2013
10/179 v. England	(Cricket West Indies) Kenny Benjamin	10 Aug 1995
10/201 v. Australia	(England) Ken Farnes	8 Jun 1934

Note: best match figures limited to 10; there have actually been seven 10-wicket match hauls at Trent Bridge.

Lowest strike rate (4+ innings)
Strike rate	Player	Period
26.5 (16 wickets)	(England) Shoab Bashir	2024–2025
29.2 (16 wickets)	(Australia) Terry Alderman	1981–1989
30.3 (16 wickets)	(India) Jasprit Bumrah	2018–2021
30.8 (15 wickets)	(England) Tim Bresnan	2011–2012
35.8 (14 wickets)	(Australia) Dennis Lillee	1972–1981

=== Team records ===
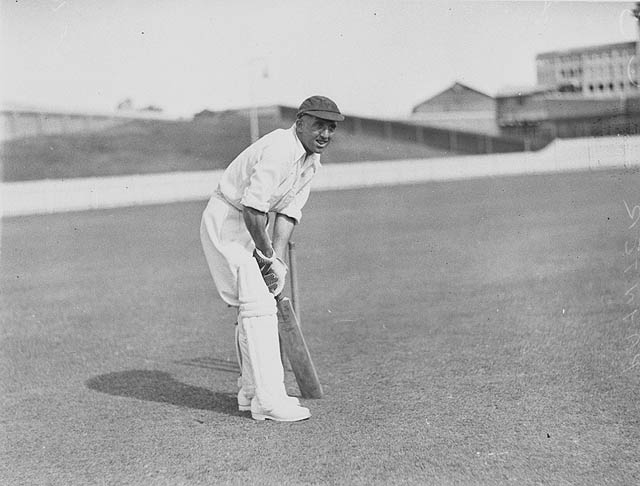
Eddie Paynter topscored with 216*, as England totalled 658/8d in 1938.

Highest innings scores
Score	Team	Date
658/8d	England v. Australia	10 Jun 1938
619/6d	England v. West Indies	4 Jul 1957
617	England v. India	8 Aug 2002
602/6d	Australia v. England	10 Aug 1989
567/8d	England v. New Zealand	2 Jun 1994

Lowest completed innings
Score	Team	Date
60	Australia v. England	6 Aug 2015
80	Pakistan v. England	29 Jul 2010
88	South Africa v. England	7 Jul 1960
97	New Zealand v. England	7 Jun 1973
112	England v. Australia	28 May 1921

=== Partnership records ===
Highest partnerships
Runs	Wicket	Players	Match	Date
329	1st	Mark Taylor (219) & Geoff Marsh (138)	Australia v. England	10 Aug 1989
319	3rd	Alan Melville (189) & Dudley Nourse (149)	South Africa v. England	7 Jun 1947
303	3rd	Viv Richards (232) & Alvin Kallicharran (97)	West Indies v. England	3 Jun 1976
283	4th	Frank Worrell (261) & Everton Weekes (129)	West Indies v. England	20 Jul 1950
266	2nd	Tom Graveney (258) & Peter Richardson (126)	England v. West Indies	4 Jul 1957

Highest partnerships by wicket
Runs	Wicket	Players	Match	Date
329	1st	Mark Taylor (219) & Geoff Marsh (138)	Australia v. England	10 Aug 1989
266	2nd	Tom Graveney (258) & Peter Richardson (126)	England v. West Indies	4 Jul 1957
319	3rd	Alan Melville (189) & Dudley Nourse (149)	South Africa v. England	7 Jun 1947
283	4th	Frank Worrell (261) & Everton Weekes (129)	West Indies v. England	20 Jul 1950
237	5th	Denis Compton (163) & Norman Yardley (99)	England v. South Africa	7 Jun 1947
215	6th	Alan Knott (135) & Geoffrey Boycott (107)	England v. Australia	28 Jul 1977
204	7th	Marlon Samuels (117) & Daren Sammy (106)	West Indies v. England	25 May 2012
107	8th	Lindsay Hassett (137) & Ray Lindwall (42)	Australia v. England	10 Jun 1948
103	9th	Craig White (94*) & Matthew Hoggard (32)	England v. India	8 Aug 2002
198	10th	Joe Root (154*) & James Anderson (81)	England v. India	9 Jul 2014

Last updated 25 October 2025.

In 2013, Australia's Ashton Agar achieved the highest Test score by a number 11 batter.

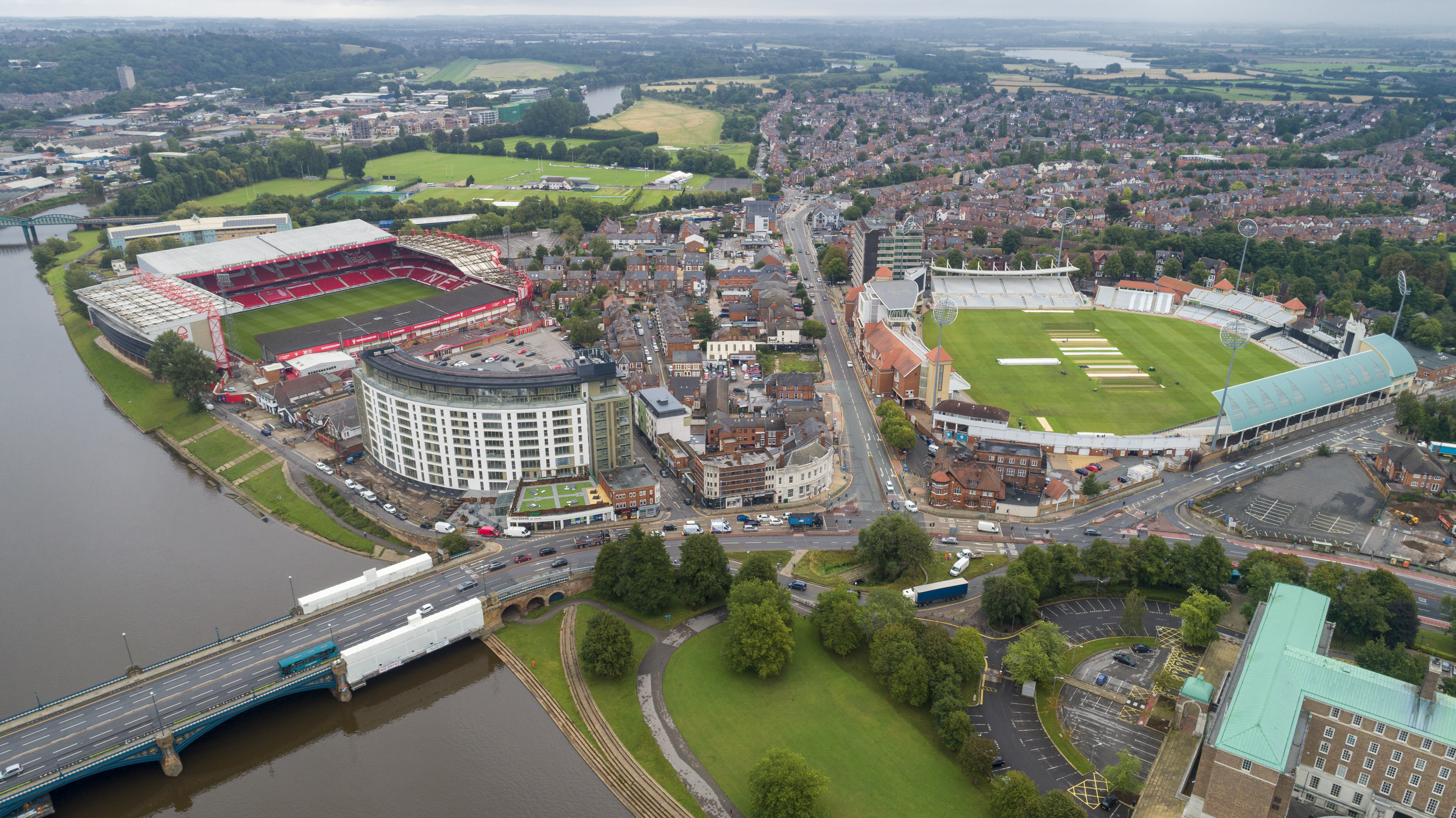
Trent Bridge cricket ground, the adjacent bridge and the City Ground, home of Nottingham Forest Football Club

== One Day International records ==
In 2016, England broke the record for highest One Day International (ODI) score when they made 444/3 against Pakistan at the ground. They bettered this score on the same ground two years latter when making 481/6 against Australia.

In ODIs, the leading run-scorers here are Eoin Morgan (471 runs), Alex Hales (441 runs), and Jos Buttler (439 runs). The leading wicket-takers are James Anderson (16 wickets), Stuart Broad (14 wickets) and Waqar Younis (12 wickets).

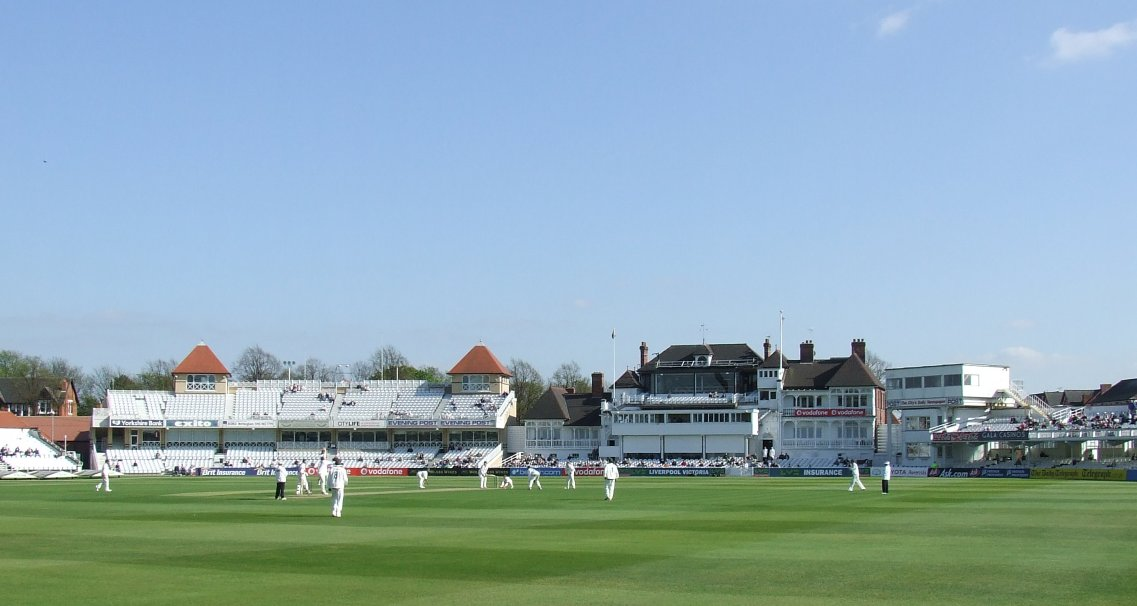
The pavilion during a County Championship match in 2007

== See also ==
- List of cricket grounds in England and Wales
- List of Test cricket grounds
- History of Test cricket from 1890 to 1900
