= Alexander Snowden =

English cricketer

Alexander William Snowden (1913–1981) was an English cricketer active from 1931 to 1939 who played for Northamptonshire (Northants). He was born in Peterborough on 15 August 1913 and died there on 7 May 1981. He appeared in 136 first-class matches as a righthanded batsman who bowled left arm medium pace. He scored 4,346 runs with a highest score of 128, one of two centuries, and took two wickets with a best performance of one for 5.
