= Len Darling =

Australian cricketer

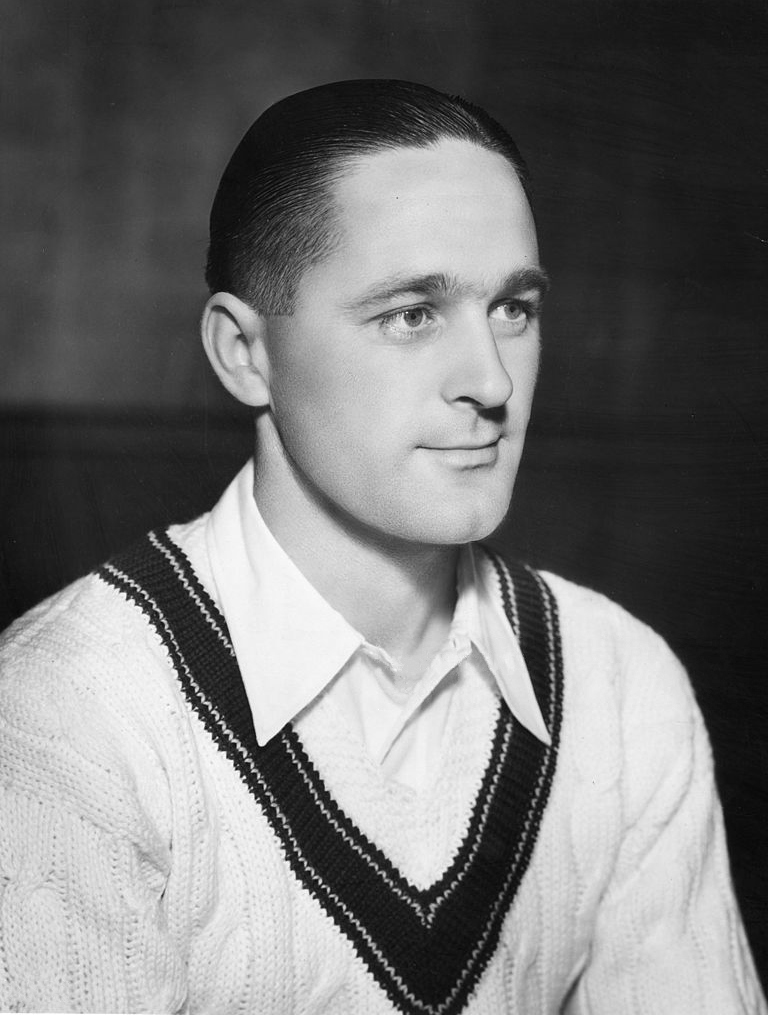
- Darling in 1934

Personal information
- Born: 14 August 1909; South Yarra, Victoria, Australia
- Died: 24 June 1992 (aged 82); Daw Park, South Australia
- Batting: Left-handed
- Bowling: Right-arm medium
- Role: Batsman

International information
- National side: Australia (1933–1937)
- Test debut (cap 147): 10 February 1933 v England
- Last Test: 1 January 1937 v England

Career statistics
Competition	Test	First-class
Matches	12	100
Runs scored	474	5,780
Batting average	27.88	42.50
100s/50s	0/3	16/26
Top score	85	188
Balls bowled	162	3,075
Wickets	0	32
Bowling average	–	46.93
5 wickets in innings	–	0
10 wickets in match	–	0
Best bowling	–	3/57
Catches/stumpings	8/–	59/–
- Source: Cricinfo, 10 September 2019

Leonard Stuart Darling (14 August 1909 – 24 June 1992) was an Australian cricketer who played in 12 Test matches from 1933 to 1937.

Darling once told a story of fielding on the boundary at the Sydney Cricket Ground and positioning himself to catch a big hit from Don Bradman. While the ball was still in the air, according to Darling, the crowd yelled at him to drop the catch. This occurred in Bradman's last innings for New South Wales in 1934. Darling did in fact take the catch to end Bradman's innings. Bradman was out for 128, with him hitting three sixes in the over, and getting caught while trying to hit his fourth.

Len Darling married his wife Phyllis ("Bobby") in 1937. They had two daughters. He served in the Australian Army with the 24th Australian Anti-Aircraft Battery in World War II.
