= Tim Wall =

Australian cricketer

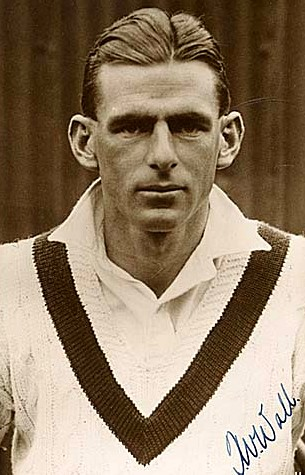

Personal information
- Full name: Thomas Welbourn Wall
- Born: 13 May 1904; Semaphore, South Australia
- Died: 26 March 1981 (aged 76)
- Batting: Right-handed
- Bowling: Right-arm fast

International information
- National side: Australia
- Test debut (cap 133): 8 March 1929 v England
- Last Test: 20 July 1934 v England

Career statistics
Competition	Test	First-class
Matches	18	108
Runs scored	121	1,071
Batting average	6.36	10.50
100s/50s	0/0	0/1
Top score	20	53*
Balls bowled	4,812	21,604
Wickets	56	330
Bowling average	35.89	29.93
5 wickets in innings	3	10
10 wickets in match	0	2
Best bowling	5/14	10/36
Catches/stumpings	11/–	54/–
- Source: Cricinfo, 22 December 2021

Thomas Welbourn "Tim" Wall (13 May 1904 – 26 March 1981) was an Australian cricketer who played eighteen Test matches between 1929 and 1934. On his debut, he took five wickets in the second innings against England in Melbourne.

Wall was a school teacher in Adelaide before and after his cricket career. He died in 1981 after a long battle with Parkinson's disease. Wall's 10–36 in February 1933 remains the best first-class figures recorded in Australia. It is also the only ten-wicket innings ever recorded for South Australia.

Wall's grandson Brett Swain played 23 first-class matches for South Australia from 1994 to 2001.
