= Australian cricket team in New Zealand in 1945–46 =

International cricket tour

| | New Zealand | Australia |
- Dates: 1 March 1946 – 30 March 1946
| Captains | Walter Hadlee | Bill Brown |

Test series
- Result: Australia won the 1-match series 1–0
| Most runs | Merv Wallace (24) | Bill Brown (67) |
| Most wickets | Jack Cowie (6) | Bill O'Reilly (8) |

The Australian national cricket team toured New Zealand in March 1946, playing a single Test match against New Zealand's national team.

The Test, played at the Basin Reserve, Wellington, was the first played between the two countries, and the first Test played after the conclusion of World War II. The match was granted Test status only retrospectively. The Australians opened the tour with first-class matches against the four Plunket Shield teams, winning all by large margins, three of them by an innings.

Australia (captained by Bill Brown), won the Test match by an innings and 103 runs, having bowled out New Zealand (captained by Walter Hadlee) twice in less than two days. The two national sides did not again meet in Tests until New Zealand toured during the 1973–74 season.

== Background ==
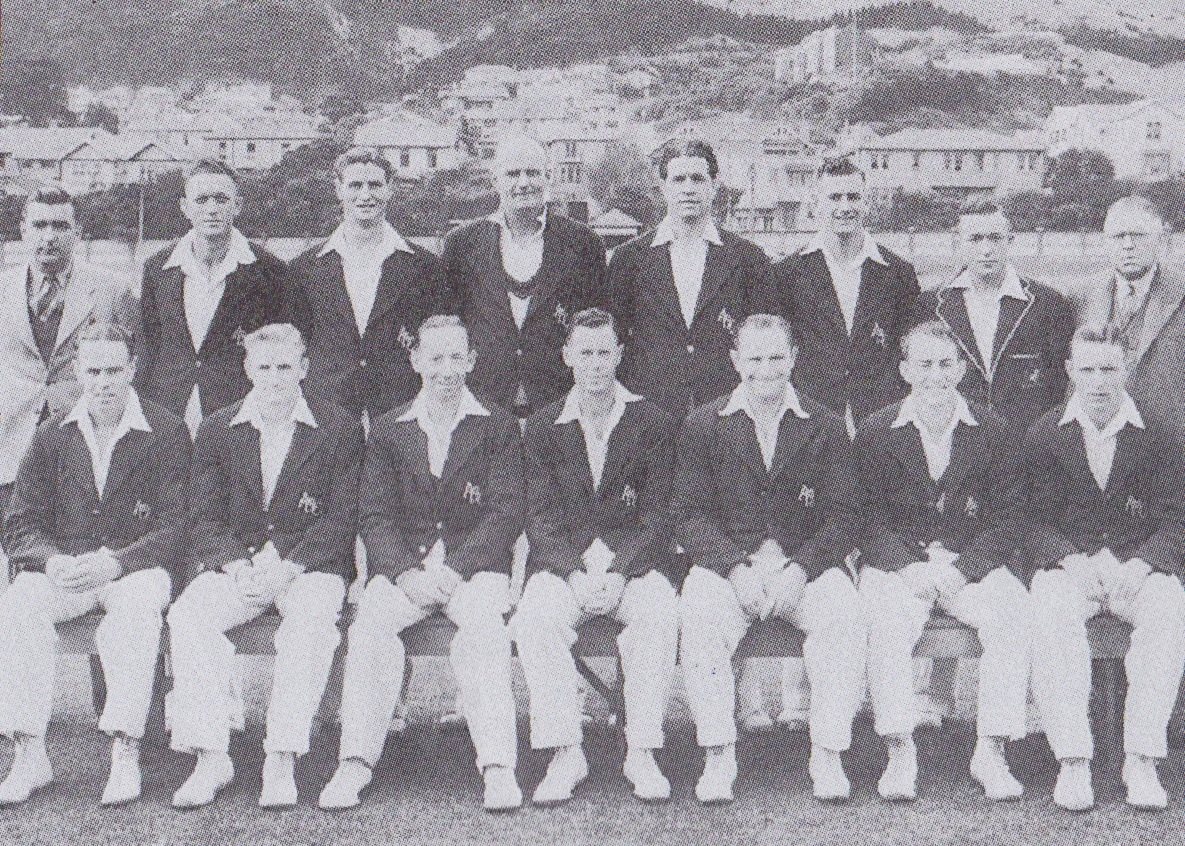
The Australian team prior to the Test in Wellington, which attracted crowds of 20,000 on the first day and 16,000 on the second day.

Teams from the Australian colonies had visited New Zealand as early as the 1877–78 season, when a combined Australian team played several matches against New Zealand teams. These tours persisted well into the early 20th century, with unofficial Test matches between national representative sides occurring during both the 1909–10 and 1913–14 tours. However, no full internationals were played, owing to the Australian Board of Control for International Cricket's perception of New Zealand as a second-class team. Despite this, New Zealand played its first Test series when an English team toured during the 1929–30 season. Australia had not played an official Test series since its 1938 tour of England, with New Zealand's last Test series occurring on its tour of England the previous season.

A Test tour by Australia, planned for February and March 1940, was cancelled after the outbreak of the Second World War. An itinerary of 14 matches – three Tests, four first-class matches against Plunket Shield teams, and seven other matches – had been arranged, and it was expected that Don Bradman would lead a strong team.

Cricket during World War II had been severely limited in both countries, although an Australian Services team, captained by Lindsay Hassett, had played a series of "Victory Tests" during the 1945 English season.

== Tour matches ==
=== First-class: Auckland v Australians ===
1–5 March 1946
Scorecard

| Australians (Australia) | v | (New Zealand) Auckland |
| 579 all out (178.5 overs); Keith Miller 139; Don Cleverley 2/118 (38.5 overs) | | 138 all out (68 overs); Verdun Scott 41*; Ernie Toshack 5/27 (25 overs) |
| | | 261 all out (117 overs); Merv Wallace 78; Bill O'Reilly 5/52 (29 overs) |

Australians won by an innings and 180 runs
Eden Park, Auckland
Umpires: RW Mitchell & OR Montgomery

- Australians won the toss and elected to bat.

=== First-class: Canterbury v Australians ===
8–11 March 1946
Scorecard

| Australians (Australia) | v | (New Zealand) Canterbury |
| 8/415 dec. (128 overs); Bill Brown 137; Roy Scott 2/86 (28 overs) | | 141 all out (70.1 overs); Mac Anderson 61; Sid Barnes 3/0 (2.1 overs) |
| | | 239 all out (117 overs); Richard Shand 60; Keith Miller 2/6 (4 overs) |

Australians won by an innings and 35 runs
Lancaster Park, Christchurch
Umpires: TW Burgess & HW Gourlay

- Australians won the toss and elected to bat.

=== First-class: Otago v Australians ===
15–19 March 1946
Scorecard

| Otago (New Zealand) | v | (Australia) Australians |
| 168 all out (72.5 overs); Lankford Smith 31*; Bill O'Reilly 4/39 (24 overs) | | 420 all out (149.3 overs); Bill Brown 106; Guy Overton 3/86 (33 overs) |
| 347 all out (124.3 overs); Walter Hadlee 198; Bill O'Reilly 4/89 (27 overs) | | 2/96 (28.3 overs); Ken Meuleman 36; Bill McDougall 2/26 (8 overs) |

Australians won by 8 wickets
Carisbrook, Dunedin
Umpires: HW Gourlay & GF Gunn

- Otago won the toss and elected to bat.

=== First-class: Wellington v Australians ===
22–25 March 1946
Scorecard

| Wellington (New Zealand) | v | (Australia) Australians |
| 94 all out (40 overs); Gordon Rowe 22; Bruce Dooland 3/16 (9 overs) | | 415 all out (153.1 overs); Lindsay Hassett 114; Ray Buchan 4/99 (42.1 overs) |
| 161 all out (73 overs); Roy Crawford 40; Ernie Toshack 6/40 (26 overs) |

Australians won by an innings and 160 runs
Basin Reserve, Wellington
Umpires: TW Dick & MF Pengelly

- Wellington won the toss and elected to bat.

== Test series ==
=== Only Test ===
29–30 March 1946
Scorecard

| New Zealand | v | Australia |
| 42 all out (39 overs); Verdun Scott 14; Bill O'Reilly 5/14 (12 overs) | | 8/199 dec. (74 overs); Bill Brown 67; Jack Cowie 6/40 (21 overs) |
| 54 all out (32.2 overs); Merv Wallace 14; Bill O'Reilly 3/19 (7 overs) |

Australia won by an innings and 103 runs
Basin Reserve, Wellington
Umpires: HW Gourlay & MF Pengelly

The status of the match at the time was uncertain, and the game was not recognised as an official Test until March 1948. Instead of the usual baggy greens, the Australians wore caps and blazers marked "ABC" (for "Australian Board of Control"). Both teams included several debutants—of the twenty-two players in the match, thirteen were making their debut. Australia's best batsman and usual captain Don Bradman declined to tour, having suffered from regular bouts of fibrositis. Queensland batsman Bill Brown was selected as captain in his place, although Lindsay Hassett had also been suggested for the position. New Zealand was skippered by Otago batsman Walter Hadlee, with pre-war captain Curly Page having retired. Australia included seven debutants for the Test, many of whom would go on to play large roles for the national side in later tours, including during the 1948 "Invincibles" tour. The match was also Bill O'Reilly's last at Test level.

=== Teams ===
| Australia | New Zealand |
|---|---|
| Bill Brown (c) | Walter Hadlee (c) |
| Sid Barnes | Mac Anderson |
| Lindsay Hassett | Ces Burke |
| Ian Johnson | Len Butterfield |
| Ray Lindwall | Don Cleverley |
| Colin McCool | Jack Cowie |
| Ken Meuleman | Don McRae |
| Keith Miller | Gordon Rowe |
| Bill O'Reilly | Verdun Scott |
| Don Tallon (wk) | Eric Tindill (wk) |
| Ernie Toshack | Merv Wallace |

== Bibliography ==
- Hutchinson, Garrie; et al. (2004). 200 Years of Australian Cricket (Revised ed.). Sydney, New South Wales, Australia: Pan Macmillan Australia Pty Ltd. ISBN 1-4050-3641-9.
- Williams, Charles (1996). Bradman: An Australian Hero (2001 reprint ed.). London, United Kingdom: Abacus. ISBN 0-349-11475-7.
