= Roy Crawford (cricketer) =

New Zealand cricketer

Personal information
- Full name: Francis Roy Crawford
- Born: 23 December 1917; Wellington, New Zealand
- Died: 29 July 1996 (aged 78); Wellington, New Zealand
- Batting: Right-handed
- Bowling: Right-arm leg-spin

Domestic team information
- Years: Team
- 1937/38–1947/48: Wellington
- 1945/46: Bay of Plenty
- 1949/50: Hutt Valley

Career statistics
Competition	First-class
Matches	12
Runs scored	459
Batting average	20.86
100s/50s	0/3
Top score	55
Balls bowled	415
Wickets	6
Bowling average	47.33
5 wickets in innings	0
10 wickets in match	0
Best bowling	2/37
Catches/stumpings	8/–
- Source: Cricinfo, 13 December 2019

Francis Roy Crawford (23 December 1917 – 29 July 1996) was a New Zealand cricketer who played first-class cricket for Wellington from 1937 to 1948.

Roy Crawford was a "stylish but forceful" middle-order batsman and leg-spin bowler. He top-scored for Wellington with 12 and 40 when they were defeated by an innings by the touring Australians in 1945–46. Earlier that season he had also top-scored for Wellington with 55 (out of a total of 130) and 19 when Auckland beat them by an innings. In 1946–47 he top-scored for Wellington against the touring MCC, making 50 in the first innings.

Crawford attended St Patrick's College, Wellington. He married Grace Maher, and served in the Royal New Zealand Air Force in World War II, first with the rank of leading aircraftman and later as a sergeant.
