= English cricket team in New Zealand in 1946–47 =

International cricket tour

The England national cricket team toured New Zealand in March 1947 and played a single Test match against the New Zealand national cricket team. The game was ruined by rain and ended in a draw. England were captained by Wally Hammond and New Zealand by Walter Hadlee, who scored 116.

== Test series summary ==
21–25 March 1947
Scorecard

New Zealand	v	England
345/9d (102.4 overs); WA Hadlee 116; AV Bedser 4/95 (39 overs)		265/7d (83 overs); WR Hammond 79; J Cowie 6/83 (30 overs)

Match drawn
Lancaster Park, Christchurch
Umpires: OR Montgomery and MF Pengelly

- England won the toss and elected to field.
- 23 March was taken as a rest day
- There was no play on the third or fourth days
- B Sutcliffe, DD Taylor, FB Smith, RH Scott, TB Burtt and CA Snedden (all NZ) made their Test debuts.
