= David Watt (New Zealand cricketer) =

New Zealand cricketer and periodontist (1920–1996)

Personal information
- Full name: David Glendenning Watt
- Born: 21 July 1920; Ashburton, Canterbury, New Zealand
- Died: 29 August 1996 (aged 76); Wellington, New Zealand
- Batting: Right-handed

Domestic team information
- Years: Team
- 1943/44: Otago

Career statistics
Competition	First-class
Matches	1
Runs scored	120
Batting average	60.00
100s/50s	1/0
Top score	105
Catches/stumpings	1/–
- Source: Cricinfo, 5 October 2022

David Glendenning Watt (21 July 1920 – 29 August 1996) was a New Zealand cricketer and periodontist. In his only first-class match, which he played for Otago in the 1943–44 season, he scored a century.

== Life and career ==
Born in Ashburton, where his father was a dentist, David Watt attended Timaru Boys' High School before studying dentistry at the University of Otago. After completing his degree in 1943 he spent a year teaching at the university's medical school before returning to Ashburton and taking over his father's dental practice.

While working at the university and representing the university club in senior Dunedin cricket, Watt was selected to be twelfth man for Otago in a first-class match against Canterbury in Christchurch over the Christmas period in 1943. When one of the Otago players, Bill McDougall, was unable to travel to Christchurch for the match, Watt took his place in the team. He scored 15 in the first innings and 105 in the second; no other Otago batsman in either innings reached 40 in their innings defeat. Otago's only other scheduled first-class match for the season, a return match against Canterbury in Dunedin, could not take place owing to wartime travel restrictions, so Watt was unable to play again for Otago before he returned to Ashburton in mid-1944. While living in Ashburton he played minor inter-provincial cricket for Ashburton County.

After three years practising as a dentist in Ashburton, Watt was awarded a travelling scholarship, the Dunedin Savings Bank Scholarship, and he and his wife went to Canada for three years, where Watt completed a DDS with honours and a BSc at the University of Toronto. He returned to New Zealand to practise as a periodontist, settling in Wellington. He served as secretary of the New Zealand Society of Periodontology, and chairman of the New Zealand Dental Council. In 1977, he was awarded the Queen Elizabeth II Silver Jubilee Medal.

Watt died at Wellington in 1996. He was aged 76. An obituary was published in the 2002 edition of the New Zealand Cricket Almanack.
