= Richard Shand =

New Zealand cricketer

Personal information
- Full name: Richard Cecil Stevens Alison Shand
- Born: 11 May 1916; Christchurch, New Zealand
- Died: 23 December 1965 (aged 49); Christchurch, New Zealand
- Batting: Right-handed

Domestic team information
- Years: Team
- 1937-38 to 1946-47: Canterbury

Career statistics
Competition	First-class
Matches	9
Runs scored	424
Batting average	24.94
100s/50s	0/4
Top score	77
Balls bowled	0
Wickets	–
Bowling average	–
5 wickets in innings	–
10 wickets in match	–
Best bowling	–
Catches/stumpings	3/–
- Source: Cricinfo, 29 January 2018

Richard Cecil Stevens Alison Shand (11 May 1916 – 23 December 1965) was a New Zealand cricketer who played first-class cricket for Canterbury from 1938 to 1947.

A middle-order batsman, Shand had his most successful season in 1945–46, when he helped Canterbury win the Plunket Shield. In the first match he made 77, Canterbury's highest score in the match; the score was 48 for 5 when he went to the wicket, but he and Len Butterfield added 172 for the sixth wicket, and Canterbury reached 281 all out and took first-innings points in the drawn match. In the second match, he was again Canterbury's top-scorer, with 75 in the first innings in the victory over Wellington.

Later that season, when Canterbury played the touring Australians, Shand made 60 in 70 minutes in the second innings, the highest score in a losing total. It was one of only five fifties New Zealand batsmen scored against the Australians in their five first-class matches, and the only one by a player who was not subsequently selected in the New Zealand Test team at the end of the tour.
