= Gordon Rowe =

New Zealand cricketer

- Rowe in 1952–53

Personal information
- Full name: Charles Gordon Rowe
- Born: 30 June 1915; Glasgow, Scotland
- Died: 9 June 1995 (aged 79); Palmerston North, New Zealand
- Batting: Right-handed

International information
- National side: New Zealand
- Only Test (cap 38): 29 March 1946 v Australia

Domestic team information
- Years: Team
- 1944/45–1945/46: Wellington
- 1952/53: Central Districts

Career statistics
| Competition | Test | First-class |
|---|---|---|
| Matches | 1 | 11 |
| Runs scored | 0 | 380 |
| Batting average | 0.00 | 20.00 |
| 100s/50s | 0/0 | 0/2 |
| Top score | 0 | 72 |
| Balls bowled | – | 249 |
| Wickets | – | 3 |
| Bowling average | – | 29.33 |
| 5 wickets in innings | – | 0 |
| 10 wickets in match | – | 0 |
| Best bowling | – | 2/36 |
| Catches/stumpings | 1/– | 10/– |
- Source: Cricinfo, 27 June 2021

Charles Gordon Rowe (30 June 1915 – 9 June 1995) was a New Zealand cricketer who played in one Test match in 1946 against Australia. He also represented New Zealand at hockey.

== Life and career ==
=== Early life and war service ===
Rowe was born at Glasgow in Scotland in 1915 and died at Palmerston North in New Zealand in 1995 aged 79. He served overseas in the New Zealand Army in the Second World War. At the time he was a policeman in Auckland.

=== Cricket ===
A middle-order batsman, Rowe made his first-class cricket debut in 1944–45, and had played six first-class matches for Wellington before being selected for the New Zealand Test team, having scored 324 runs at an average of 27.00 runs per innings, with his top score of 72 made against Otago at Wellington. He had also scored 102 and 79 in a non-first-class match for Wellington against Canterbury in 1944–45.

In his Test match, also played in Wellington, Rowe was dismissed for a pair, bowled by Bill O'Reilly each time. He is one of the ten players to be dismissed for a pair in their only Test. The only other New Zealander in that list is Len Butterfield, who played in the same Test match.

Rowe played no further first-class matches for six seasons, but returned to captain Central Districts in 1952–53. He had little success with the bat, but in his last match he led the team to an innings victory against Otago, which ensured Central Districts finished in second place in the Plunket Shield.

Rowe stood as an umpire in three matches in the 1982 Women's Cricket World Cup held in New Zealand.

=== Hockey ===
Rowe was also a hockey player. He represented New Zealand against India in 1938. He scored four goals when Wairarapa defeated the touring Australian team 6–3 at Masterton in August 1948. He retired from representative hockey in 1958.

== See also ==
- List of Test cricketers born in non-Test playing nations
