= Bill McDougall (cricketer) =

New Zealand cricketer

- McDougall pictured in 1945

Personal information
- Full name: Angus William McDougall
- Born: 2 April 1913; Port Chalmers, Dunedin, Otago, New Zealand
- Died: 3 May 1983 (aged 70); Lower Hutt, Wellington, New Zealand
- Batting: Right-handed
- Bowling: Right-arm medium

Domestic team information
- Years: Team
- 1944/45–1946/47: Otago

Career statistics
Competition	First-class
Matches	8
Runs scored	196
Batting average	19.60
100s/50s	0/0
Top score	34
Balls bowled	1,914
Wickets	31
Bowling average	23.77
5 wickets in innings	0
10 wickets in match	0
Best bowling	4/44
Catches/stumpings	7/–
- Source: ESPNcricinfo, 29 October 2021

Angus William McDougall (2 April 1913 – 3 May 1983) was a New Zealand cricketer.

A tall medium-pace bowler with a military bearing, and a useful lower-order batsman, McDougall played eight first-class matches for Otago between 1944 and 1947. In Otago's match against the visiting Australian team in 1946 he took three wickets, and against the English team in 1947 he took seven wickets, including those of Wally Hammond and Denis Compton. He took his best bowling figures in the Plunket Shield match against Auckland in 1946-47, when he took 3 for 68 and 4 for 44 (match figures of 53–13–112–7).

McDougall attended Timaru Boys' High School before moving to Dunedin in the 1930s. He joined the police force in Dunedin in 1934, and in 1937 was transferred from the uniform branch to the detective branch. In 1946 he was promoted to detective-sergeant. He worked as a detective throughout his cricket career with Otago. He was transferred to Invercargill in March 1947, effectively ending his first-class cricket career. While stationed in Invercargill, he was promoted to senior detective in 1955.

He died at Lower Hutt in 1983 at the age of 70. An obituary was published in the 1983 edition of the New Zealand Cricket Almanack.
