= Harry Gourlay (umpire) =

New Zealand cricket umpire

Personal information
- Full name: Henry William Gourlay
- Born: 16 October 1895; Christchurch, New Zealand
- Died: 17 August 1970 (aged 74); Christchurch, New Zealand

Umpiring information
- Tests umpired: 1 (1946)
- Source: Cricinfo, 6 July 2013

Henry William Gourlay (16 October 1895 – 17 August 1970) was a New Zealand cricket umpire, schoolteacher and botanist.

== Education ==
Gourlay was educated at Addington School and Christchurch West High School and gained a Master of Science degree at Canterbury University College.

== Employment ==
Gourlay served as a pupil-teacher at Addington School, and later compiled the school's history. He taught at Christchurch Boys' High School from 1919 to 1958. At the time of his retirement he was the school's senior biology master.

== Cricket ==
Gourlay stood in one Test match, New Zealand vs. Australia, in Wellington in 1946. In all he umpired 12 first-class matches, most of them in Christchurch, between 1944 and 1950. He was a life member of the New Zealand Cricket Umpires Association.

== Botany ==
Gourlay collaborated with his Christchurch Boys High School colleague Robert Malcolm Laing, researching the algal genus Gigartina, the New Zealand species of Pittosporum, as well as the flora of the Bealey River basin. He was a founding member of, and in 1959 was elected a life member of, the New Zealand Rose Society. He landscaped the new grounds of the Christchurch Boys High School when the school moved to Riccarton in the 1920s.

== Family and death ==
He married Hilda Beatrice Harrison in Christchurch in December 1919. He died in Christchurch in August 1970, aged 74.

== See also ==
- List of Test cricket umpires
- Australian cricket team in New Zealand in 1945–46
