= Don McRae (cricketer) =

New Zealand sportsman

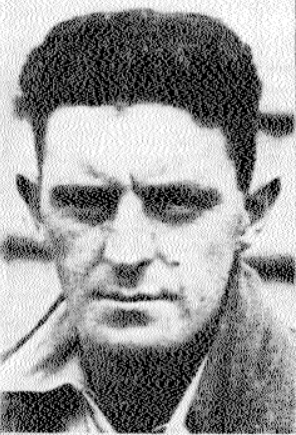

Personal information
- Full name: Donald Alexander Noel McRae
- Born: 25 December 1914; Christchurch, New Zealand
- Died: 10 August 1986 (aged 71); Christchurch, New Zealand
- Height: 6 ft 3 in (1.91 m)
- Batting: Left-handed
- Bowling: Left-arm medium

International information
- National side: New Zealand (1946)
- Test debut (cap 37): 29 March 1946 v Australia

Domestic team information
- Years: Team
- 1937/38–1945/46: Canterbury

Career statistics
Competition	Test	First-class
Matches	1	17
Runs scored	8	354
Batting average	4.00	15.39
100s/50s	0/0	0/0
Top score	8	43
Balls bowled	84	3,862
Wickets	0	56
Bowling average	–	22.51
5 wickets in innings	–	1
10 wickets in match	–	0
Best bowling	–	5/20
Catches/stumpings	0/–	11/–
- Source: Cricinfo, 1 April 2017

Donald Alexander Noel McRae (25 December 1914 – 10 August 1986) was a double international sportsman, representing New Zealand in cricket and in soccer. His last first-class cricket match was in New Zealand's first Test match against Australia in 1946.

== Cricket career ==
McRae played first-class cricket for Canterbury from 1937–38 to 1945–46 as a tall, economical left-arm medium-pace bowler and useful lower-order batsman. In his first match, against Otago, he top-scored in the second innings with 43, which remained his highest first-class score. In 1943–44, playing for a New Zealand XI against a New Zealand Services XI, he opened the bowling and took 5 for 20 off 17 overs in the first innings. In his four inter-provincial matches in 1944-45 he took 17 wickets at 13.29, and was considered one of the best bowlers in New Zealand.

When the Plunket Shield resumed in 1945–46, McRae took 13 wickets in the three matches at 23.69. He took only one wicket when the Australians defeated Canterbury by an innings, but still made the Test side three weeks later. He opened the bowling and took 0 for 44 and made 0 and 8 in another innings defeat, and never played first-class cricket again.

== Football career ==
McRae made a single appearance as goalkeeper for New Zealand in association football against Australia on 4 July 1936, conceding 7 goals in the 1–7 loss. His domestic club at the time was Nomads United.

== Personal life ==
McRae served with the New Zealand Army in World War II as a lance-corporal. He and his wife Dorothy, who died in 1974, had one daughter. He died at his home in Christchurch in August 1986, aged 71.

== See also ==
- One-Test wonder
