= Bill Brown (cricketer) =

Australian cricketer (1912–2008)

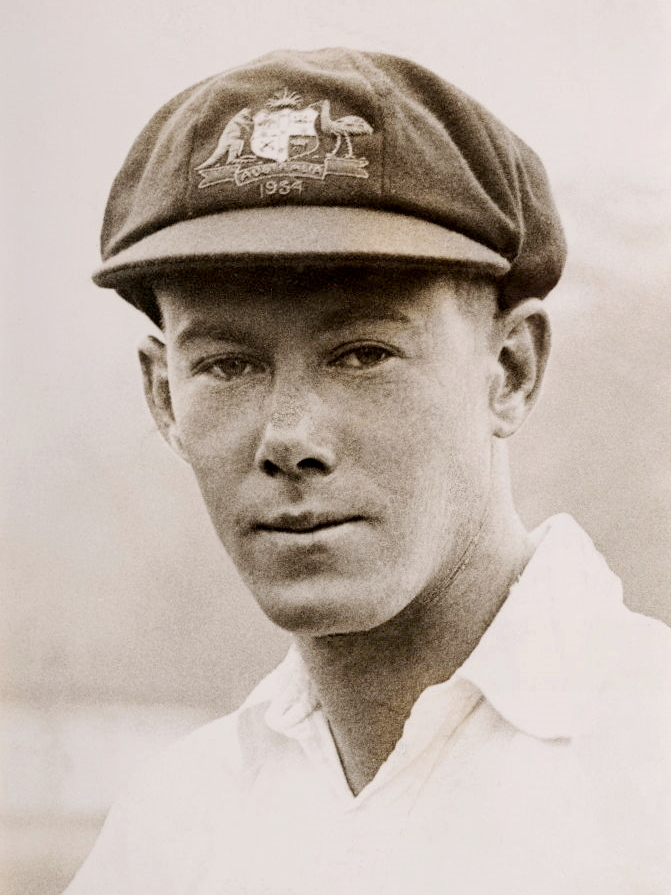

Personal information
- Full name: William Alfred Brown
- Born: 31 July 1912; Toowoomba, Queensland, Australia
- Died: 16 March 2008 (aged 95); Brisbane, Queensland, Australia
- Height: 176 cm (5 ft 9 in)
- Batting: Right-handed
- Bowling: Right-arm off spin
- Role: Batsman

International information
- National side: Australia
- Test debut (cap 150): 8 June 1934 v England
- Last Test: 24 June 1948 v England

Domestic team information
- Years: Team
- 1932/33–1935/36: New South Wales
- 1936/37–1949/50: Queensland

Career statistics
Competition	Test	First-class
Matches	22	189
Runs scored	1,592	13,838
Batting average	46.82	51.44
100s/50s	4/9	39/66
Top score	206*	265*
Balls bowled	–	169
Wickets	–	6
Bowling average	–	18.33
5 wickets in innings	–	0
10 wickets in match	–	0
Best bowling	–	4/16
Catches/stumpings	14/–	110/1
- Source: CricketArchive, 10 December 2007

William Alfred Brown, OAM (31 July 1912 – 16 March 2008) was an Australian cricketer who played 22 Test matches between 1934 and 1948, captaining his country in one Test. A right-handed opening batsman, his partnership with Jack Fingleton in the 1930s is regarded as one of the finest in Australian Test history. After the interruption of World War II, Brown was a member of the team dubbed "The Invincibles", who toured England in 1948 without defeat under the leadership of Don Bradman. In a match in November 1947, Brown was the unwitting victim of the first instance of "Mankading".

Raised in New South Wales, Brown initially struggled in both work and cricket, before gradually rising through the cricket ranks. He made his first-class debut for New South Wales in the 1932–33 season and forced his way into the national side during the 1934 tour of England. When long-term openers Bill Ponsford and Bill Woodfull retired at the end of the tour, Brown and his state opening partner Fingleton took over. After poor form made his selection for the 1938 tour of England controversial, Brown responded with a total of 1,854 runs, including an unbeaten 206 that saved Australia from defeat in the Second Test, and was honoured as one of the five Wisden Cricketers of the Year.

The outbreak of the Second World War cost Brown his peak years, which he spent in the Royal Australian Air Force. Cricket resumed in 1945–46 and Brown, in Bradman's absence, captained an Australian eleven in a match that was retrospectively awarded Test status. Brown missed the entirety of the following season because of injury. Upon his return, he was unable to repeat his previous success and was ousted from the opening positions by Arthur Morris and Sid Barnes. Selected for the Invincibles tour, he performed reasonably well in the tour matches but, with Morris and Barnes entrenched as openers, he batted out of position in the middle order during the first two Tests. He struggled and was dropped from the Test team, never to return. Upon returning to Australia, Brown continued playing for Queensland until the end of the 1949–50 season.

In retirement, Brown briefly served as a Test selector and sold cars and, later, sports goods. In 2000, he was awarded the Medal of the Order of Australia for his services to cricket. At the time of his death in 2008, he was Australia's oldest Test cricketer.

== Early years ==
The son of a dairy farmer and hotel owner, Brown was born in Toowoomba, Queensland. Aged three, business failure hit the family, and they moved to Marrickville in inner Sydney. The family's poor financial position meant that they lived in a one-bedroom home, with Brown and his brother sharing a bed. Educated at Dulwich Hill and Petersham High Schools in Sydney, Brown started playing cricket as a wicket-keeper, before changing his focus to opening the batting. He left high school after two years, but was unable to find regular full-time work amid the Great Depression. In 1929–30, Brown played grade cricket for Marrickville Cricket Club, but was unable to hold down a regular place. He was on the verge of leaving Sydney when an innings of 172 in the Poidevin-Gray Shield reinvigorated his career. Brown progressed through the grades and reached the club's First XI, where he performed steadily to earn selection for New South Wales in 1932–33.

== Pre-war career ==
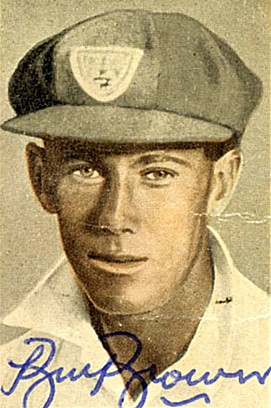
Brown during his days with New South Wales

Making his first-class debut for New South Wales in a Sheffield Shield match against Queensland on 11 November 1932, Brown was run out for a duck without facing a ball, while opening with Jack Fingleton. However, the match ended happily with Brown's team winning decisively by an innings and 274 runs. The highlights of Brown's first season were his 79 against South Australia, and 69 against Douglas Jardine's England. However, neither Harold Larwood nor Bill Voce, the Bodyline spearheads, played in the match. During his first season, Brown earned the ire of Don Bradman, who was displeased with Brown's poor communication with batting partners when running between the wickets, with the ensuing risk of falling foul of run outs. Brown ended his debut season with 269 runs at 29.88.

The following season, in the opening match of the season against Queensland at Brisbane in November 1933, Brown made 154, partnering Bradman in a stand of 294 in just three hours. This set up a total of 4/494 declared and an innings victory. He followed this with 205 in an opening stand of 340 against Victoria. Brown amassed two further half-centuries to end with 878 runs for the season at an average of 67.53, which placed him second behind Bradman in the first-class run-scoring aggregates. When the selectors met to discuss the tour party for the 1934 tour of England, Brown and Fingleton had similar figures, but with the incumbent Victorian opening pair of Bill Ponsford and captain Bill Woodfull firmly in place, there was only one spot available for a reserve opener. The selectors asked Bradman—Australia's leading batsman—for advice. Bradman nominated Brown, believing that his style was better suited to English pitches. A disappointed Fingleton disagreed and wrote to Woodfull, saying "You have chosen chaps who do not like fast bowling". Brown justified his selection before departure with a pair of 90s in two matches for a combined Australian XI against Tasmania.

Brown missed selection for the tour opener against Worcestershire—in which Australia traditionally fielded its first-choice XI—before making his debut in the second match against Leicestershire. He made a century against Cambridge University in his second tour match, making 105 in the middle order. Batting at number 3 against Lancashire in the final tour match before the Tests, Brown scored 119. After compiling 351 runs at 43.88 in the opening tour matches, he was selected for the Test side. Playing in all five Tests, Brown made his debut at Trent Bridge, Nottingham and scored 22 in his first innings. After Australia lost three early wickets in the second innings, Brown scored 73 to help secure a winning lead. Brown then made a century while opening the batting against Northamptonshire, and an unbeaten 62 in the second innings, guiding Australia to an eight-wicket victory over the Gentlemen of England. He was promoted to open in the Second Test at Lord's with Woodfull, after Ponsford was unavailable due to illness. At the home of cricket, Brown made his maiden Test century, scoring 105 in the first innings. His innings was an unhurried one; he tended to wait for the ball to come onto the bat rather than attacking the leather. However, he was unable to prevent Australia from being forced to follow-on and made two; the match ended in an innings defeat. He was retained as opener upon Ponsford's return for the Third Test, with Woodfull dropping down the order in a reshuffled batting line-up. Brown made 72 and a duck. The match ended in a draw after both teams passed 490 in the first innings.

It was the start of a barren month for Brown, who passed 30 only once in 11 first-class innings, totalling 171 runs at 15.55. He ended the unproductive sequence with an unbeaten 100 against Nottinghamshire. This came after Bill Voce had bowled Bodyline at the start of the Australian innings, in contravention of a prior agreement. After an Australian protest, Voce missed the remainder of the match and Brown's innings was punctuated by angry heckling by the local supporters.

He was unable to pass 20 in the final two Tests and ended the series with 300 runs at 33.33. Despite his inability to make a substantial contribution, Australia won the Fifth Test by 562 runs to reclaim the Ashes 2–1. Brown scored three consecutive half-centuries after the Tests and ended with 1,287 first-class runs at 36.77.

Brown's strong form continued upon returning to Australia, compiling 683 runs at 45.53, including three centuries, to be the second highest run-scorer for the 1934–35 domestic season. He started the season with the testimonial match for Woodfull, who retired upon returning to Australia. Brown scored 102 in the second innings to help Woodfull's men defeat Victor Richardson's XI by seven wickets. He started the Sheffield Shield season with 11 in an innings victory over South Australia, and scored fifties in three consecutive matches, before rounding off the season with 116 in the final match against Western Australia.

== Opening in Tests with Fingleton ==
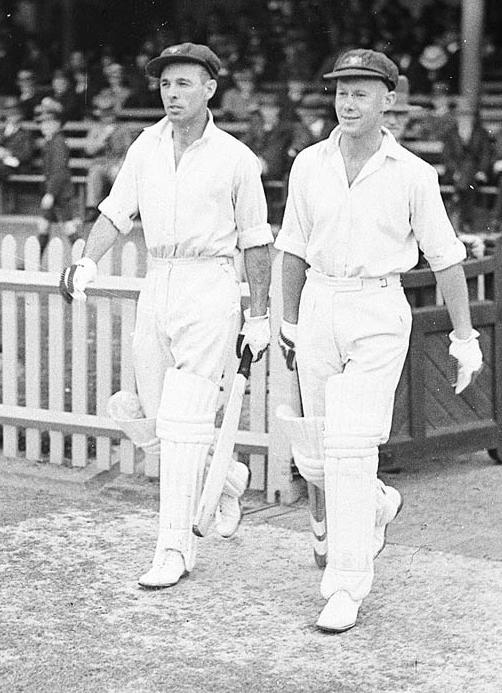
Jack Fingleton (left) and Brown walk to the crease to open for Australia during a Test against England in 1936–37.

With the retirement of Woodfull and Ponsford after the tour of England, Brown and his state partner Fingleton became Australia's opening pair for the 1935–36 tour of South Africa. It was one of the most productive phases of both men's career. In Australia's warm-up match against Western Australia before sailing across the Indian Ocean, Brown struck 55 in an innings win.

Brown started the tour consistently, scoring 148, 58, 31 and 28 not out in the three warm-up matches. In the first match of the tour against Natal, both Brown and Fingleton made centuries; the first two matches were won by an innings and the third by ten wickets.

Brown scored three consecutive half-centuries in the first two Tests in Durban and Johannesburg. Australia won the first by nine wickets and were 124 runs from victory with eight wickets in hand in the second when bad light stopped play. In the Third Test at Cape Town, the pair set a new Australian opening record of 233, which laid the foundation for a large Australian total and an innings victory. It was Australia's first double-century opening stand in Test cricket, and remains an Australian Test record for the first wicket against South Africa. Brown posted 121, his highest Test score at the time. He scored 34 and 84 in Australia's only innings of the Fourth and Fifth Tests in Johannesburg and Durban, making solid opening stands with Fingleton, who scored three consecutive centuries. The pair laid the platform for two further innings victories, as Australia took the five-Test series 4–0. Brown compiled 417 runs at 59.57 for the series. He scored a further four fifties in the remaining tour matches to end with 1,065 runs at 62.65.

In 1936, Brown accepted a coaching position and employment as a car salesman to move back to Queensland, representing his state of birth from 1936–37 onwards. He was appointed captain the following season. Brown started the new season strongly, scoring 111 for Victor Richardson's XI in a testimonial match against Bradman's XI, in the opening match of summer. In November, Brown played for an Australian XI and Queensland in two matches against the touring England team, scoring 71 and 74 in the two drawn matches.

His 1936–37 season was interrupted by injury and he appeared in only the Third and Fourth Tests against England. They were relatively unsuccessful, yielding only 95 runs at 23.75 in four innings without passing fifty. Nevertheless, Australia won the two matches. His debut season for Queensland was moderately successful, with 557 runs at an average of 37.13, including one century and four fifties. Brown did not taste victory with his home state during the season; the closest Queensland came was a one-wicket loss to New South Wales.

== Wisden Cricketer of the Year ==
Brown's form started to deteriorate in 1937–38; he scored only 400 runs at 36.36 for the season. Queensland played five matches under his watch, losing three, and went without victory. Of the two draws, one was washed out and in the other, Queensland hung on with two wickets in hand when time ran out. Although Brown compiled two centuries, he was only twelfth in the aggregates during an Australian season with no international tours. As a result, his selection for the 1938 tour to England was criticised in some quarters.

Brown started the tour patchily, although Australia won each of their first four matches by an innings. In his first four innings, Brown passed five only once, scoring 72 against Oxford University. He returned to form with an unbeaten 194 against Northamptonshire, helping to set up an innings win, before adding another 96 in the next match against Surrey. Brown entered the Tests with 504 runs at 56.00 in the lead-in tour matches.

After adding 48 in Australia's first innings of 411, Brown scored 133 in the second innings of the First Test at Nottingham after the tourists were forced to follow-on, helping Bradman (144 not out) to save the Test. The Australians reached 6/427 in the second innings when the match ended in a draw.

Brown's most celebrated innings came in the Second Test at Lord's, carrying his bat to score 206 in the first televised Test match. England batted first and amassed 494, largely on the back of Wally Hammond's 240. Brown featured in an opening stand of 69 before Fingleton was dismissed. Hedley Verity then bowled Bradman for 18, leaving the score at 101, before Stan McCabe fell after a quickfire 38 with the score at 3/152. Brown registered his century in 193 minutes, during an innings highlighted by his driving on both sides of the wicket. After Lindsay Hassett was dismissed for 56 following a 134-run partnership, Australia reached stumps at 5/299, with Brown on 140. The following day, Brown set about ensuring that Australia would avoid the follow on, featuring in an aggressive eighth-wicket stand with tailender Bill O'Reilly. The pair added 85 runs in just 46 minutes, with Brown recalling "It was a nice day, and a nice wicket. O'Reilly came in, and I told him I'd take the quicks—Wellard and Farnes—and Tiger [O'Reilly] took Verity." Brown continued past his double century and remained unbeaten on 206 from just 375 minutes when his last partner fell, leaving Australia all out for 422. Brown's innings was the 100th century by an Australian against England, and the highest Test score for a batsman carrying his bat; it stood until Glenn Turner made an unbeaten 223 in 1972. Ray Robinson quipped that Brown's performance "did not cause smoke to rise from the back of those [television] sets but the charm of his style gave viewers a favourable impression of Australian batsmanship". They went on to draw the match, which was crucial in Australia's eventual retention of the Ashes. Brown's uninterrupted batting meant that he was on the field from the first morning until late on the fourth day.

Immediately after making his highest Test score at Lord's, Brown recorded his highest first-class score of 265 not out against Derbyshire, in six hours of batting. Australia amassed 4/441 declared and won by an innings and 234 runs. He then made it three centuries in a row, scoring 101 against Warwickshire, setting up another innings win.

The Third Test was washed out without a ball being bowled, and Australia won the Fourth Test by five wickets in a low-scoring match to retain the Ashes. Brown made 22 and nine as Australia scored 242 and 5/107. It was the start of a quiet month for the opener, who scored only 194 runs in eight completed innings. He was the top Australian scorer in both innings of the Fifth Test at The Oval, scoring 69 and 15. This was the match in which Len Hutton scored a world Test record 364 and England compiled 7/903, before winning by an innings and 579 runs, which remains a world record winning margin in a Test match. Throughout the Tests, Brown aggregated 512 runs at 73.14, totalling 1,854 runs at 59.57 in all first-class matches for the tour. This placed Brown second to Bradman in both aggregates and average. He was named as one of the Wisden Cricketers of the Year for his performances in 1938. Wisden described him as a "cricketer of remarkable powers" who batted with "a charming skill, coolness, thoughtfulness and certainty".

Upon returning to Australia, Brown scored 1,057 runs at 105.70 in the 1938–39 Australian season, including 990 at 110.00 in six Sheffield Shield matches. Brown started the season well, scoring 84 as Queensland amassed 501 against New South Wales. His old state were still 27 runs from making Queensland bat again, but time ran out with one wicket intact, with Brown yet to taste victory with his new state. Nevertheless, he continued to perform strongly and passed 50 in each of his first four innings. In the fourth of these, he was out for 99 and then declared at 5/510 to leave Victoria a victory target of 319. Brown then narrowly missed out on a milestone for the second time in the match when Victoria scraped home by three wickets to deny him a maiden victory with his home state. In the next match, he carried his bat to make an unbeaten 174 against South Australia at the Adelaide Oval, as his team fell to an innings defeat.

After twelve matches for his state of origin, Brown was still to end up on the winning side. This changed in the next match against New South Wales. After their opponents had made 214, Brown top-scored with 95 as Queensland replied with 200. New South Wales made 264 to leave Brown's men 279 for victory. The captain led the way, combining with Geoff Cook in Queensland's then record first-wicket partnership of 265. Brown was out for 168, but his team held on to secure an eight-wicket victory over New South Wales. It was Brown's first win in Queensland colours. He then scored 81 in a ten-wicket defeat to South Australia, before adding a second victory, this time over Victoria. Brown ended the season by amassing 215 as Queensland reached 7/575 declared before completing an innings win. Brown topped the aggregates with 1,057 runs and was the only player to pass 1,000 runs for the season.

Brown had another strong campaign in the following year, netting 857 runs at 61.21, including three centuries. Despite this, Queensland had another poor season, losing five of their six matches. Brown started the season strongly, scoring 87 and 137, but he was unable to stop New South Wales winning the opening match by three wickets. After a seven-wicket loss to Victoria, Brown made 156, but was unable to prevent an innings defeat to South Australia. After an innings loss to New South Wales, he made 111 to steer Queensland to its only win of the season, a two-wicket victory over South Australia. He finished the season with 35 and 97 as The Rest of Australia lost to New South Wales by two wickets.

== Second World War and post-war career ==
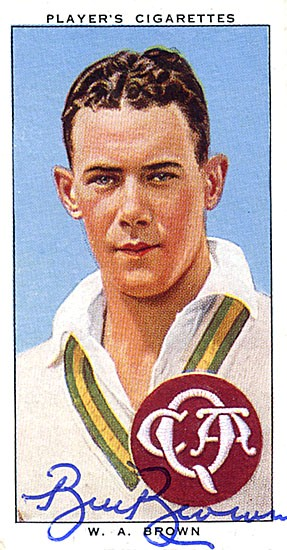
Cigarette card of Brown in the Queensland colours

Due to World War II, cricket in Australia was scaled down and in a shortened season in 1940–41, Brown made 307 runs at 30.70 in five matches, with two half-centuries. In 1941–42, he played one match, his last first-class fixture during the war, scoring 56 and 69 in a narrow 19-run win over New South Wales.

Brown was a flight lieutenant with the Royal Australian Air Force, serving in New Guinea and the Philippines during the Second World War, losing his prime years from the age of 27 to 33. During the pre-war years, he had averaged 49.02 in Test cricket.

First-class cricket resumed in 1945–46 after the Allied victory, and Brown began the post-war phase of his career with a steady season, scoring 604 runs at 46.46 with five half-centuries in seven matches. This placed him second to Sid Barnes in the run-scoring aggregates. His best effort was a 98 against South Australia, denied a century by a run out. Queensland lost more than they won, with two victories and three losses. At the end of the season, Brown captained an Australian side on a tour of New Zealand, and all five matches resulted in convincing victories for the tourists.

Australia played its inaugural Test against New Zealand in Wellington, a match that was retrospectively given Test status. The uncertain status of the tour saw the players wearing blazers that were labelled ABC (Australian Board of Control), rather than the Australian coat of arms. Brown led from the front, topping the tour aggregates and averages, with 443 runs at 73.83 in five matches. In the opening tour match against Auckland, Brown elected to bat and opened with 68 as Australia amassed 579 and took victory by an innings and 180 runs. This was followed by a match against Canterbury in Christchurch, in which Brown top-scored with 137. This laid the foundation for a total of 8/415 and another innings victory. Brown made his second consecutive century in the third match against Otago at Carisbrook in Dunedin, again top-scoring with 106 in an eight-wicket victory. He made 34 in the final tour match as Australia defeated Wellington in another innings victory.

The tour culminated in a match against New Zealand at the Basin Reserve in Wellington. With regular captain Don Bradman missing, Brown led a team that included seven Test debutants. The hosts won the toss and elected to bat first on a wet wicket, which came about after a week of rain before the match. New Zealand managed to reach 4/37 at lunch, before the sun emerged and caused the wicket to turn into a sticky with unpredictable bounce. Leg spinner Bill O'Reilly—in his last Test—and debutant Ernie Toshack, took 5/14 and 4/12 respectively as New Zealand were bowled out for only 42, losing their last six wickets for five runs. In reply, Australia were 1/9 when Ken Meuleman was dismissed. Having been dropped on 13, Brown then combined in a 109-run first-wicket stand with Barnes, before falling for the innings top-score of 67. It was the only partnership for the Test that went beyond 32. Barnes' dismissal triggered a collapse of 6/57, prompting Brown to declare Australia's innings closed at 8/199. Australia then dismissed New Zealand for 54 in the second innings in just two hours, resulting in victory by an innings and 54 runs in just two days. As the hosts' batsmen fell quickly, many of the Australian bowlers had limited opportunities. With one wicket left in the match, Brown used the toss of a coin to determine which of the debutants Colin McCool and Ian Johnson would bowl in Tests for the first time. McCool was given the ball and ended the match on his second delivery. Brown's solitary Test as captain makes him the first and the only native Queenslander to have led Australia.

Brown missed the entire 1946–47 Test series against England due to a thumb injury. This allowed young New South Wales opener Arthur Morris to make his Test debut. Morris' performance in the series eventually displaced Brown from his position as a first-choice opening batsman alongside Barnes. The injury meant that Brown was unable to play a single match for Queensland.

== Mankad ==
Brown returned to first-class cricket in 1947–48, scoring 192 runs at 38.40 in the first three matches of the season. The season saw an Indian tour of Australia. The selectors initially dropped Barnes to pair Brown with Morris to open the batting. Apart from two Tests during the 1936–37 season against England, Brown had not played Test cricket on Australian soil. He had only one opportunity with the bat in the First Test in Brisbane, making 11 as India fell to an innings defeat. It was to be his only innings and Test match on his home ground. Brown's participation in the series was overshadowed by his controversial run out by Indian left arm orthodox spinner Vinoo Mankad in the Second Test at the Sydney Cricket Ground in December 1947. Brown was run out for 18, when in the act of delivering the ball, Mankad held on to it and whipped the bails off at the non-striker's end. Brown was well out of his crease while he was backing-up the striker, so that he could get a head start in case he attempted a run. This was the second time during the season that Mankad had dismissed Brown in this fashion—as he had previously done so in a match against an Australian XI in November. On that occasion, Mankad had warned Brown before running him out. The local press strongly accused Mankad of being unsportsmanlike, although some Australians—including Bradman—defended Mankad's actions. For his part, Brown took full blame and made light of the incident through humorous gestures in later matches, which referred to the event. After this incident, if a batsman is given out this way, he is said to have been "Mankaded".

The dismissal ended another low-scoring innings, and Australia batted only once in a shortened match. Brown was omitted from the team in favour of Barnes for the next two Tests. Morris—who had established himself as one of Australia's first-choice opening batsmen during Brown's injury layoff during the previous season—was rested for the Fifth Test as the Australian Board trialled potential candidates for the 1948 tour of England. Morris was omitted after losing a coin toss to Barnes. Brown partnered Barnes, making 99 in the first innings before being run out. Brown had survived a confident appeal for caught behind before he had scored, and Barnes was convinced that his partner had edged the ball. Barnes claimed that had Brown failed to make an impact in the innings, he would have been overlooked for the 1948 tour.

During the first innings, Brown captained Australia while Bradman was absent with fibrositis. The tourists fell for 331, with debutants Sam Loxton and Doug Ring taking three wickets apiece. India eventually fell to another innings defeat, so Brown did not have another opportunity to score a Test century on home soil. His Test aggregate in Australia stood at 223 runs at only 33.86, in contrast to his away average of 1,369 runs at 50.70. His first-class batting average of 43.58 for the season was inferior to that of Barnes and Morris, both of whom averaged more than 50.

== Invincibles tour ==
In any case, Brown had done enough to be chosen to tour England in 1948 with the team that became known as the Invincibles, although Barnes and Morris were the first-choice opening combination. Brown made a strong start in the tour matches preceding the Tests. In the fifth fixture, which was against Cambridge University, Brown top-scored with 200 in an innings victory. In the following match against Essex, he combined with Bradman in a second-wicket partnership of 219 in 90 minutes, ending with 153 as Australia scored a world-record 721 runs in one day. Australia proceeded to another innings victory, and Brown completed his third century in as many innings with 108 against Oxford University. He proceeded to add a fourth century in less than three weeks, with 122 against Nottinghamshire, and made an unbeaten 81 against Hampshire. In contrast, middle-order batsman Neil Harvey had struggled in the initial stages of his first tour of England, failing to pass 25 in his first six innings. Thus, Brown gained selection in the First Test at Trent Bridge, batting out of position in the middle order, whereas Harvey was dropped despite making a century in Australia's most recent Test against India.

Brown made 17 in his only innings as Australia won by eight wickets. Between Tests, Brown scored 113 in a slow innings against Yorkshire to retain his middle-order position for the Second Test at Lord's. He was unable to replicate the Test centuries he made in the preceding tours, scoring 24 and 32. It was to be his last Test, as Sam Loxton top-scored with 159 not out against Gloucestershire in the match before the Third Test, ousting Brown from his middle-order position. Barnes was injured in the Third Test, but Brown was not recalled for the Fourth Test; instead, Lindsay Hassett was promoted to open with Morris, while the teenaged Harvey came into the middle-order and struck 112. Brown then scored 140 against Derbyshire immediately after the Fourth Test, in a dour display that displeased spectators, and then scored consecutive centuries against Kent and the Gentlemen of England after the Tests. He ended with eight centuries and a total of 1,448 runs on the tour at an average of 57.92, behind only Bradman, Hassett and Morris, with the 200 against Cambridge University his highest score. Brown took 4/16 against the South of England in his only bowling assignment of the tour. It was his best career bowling figures, having amassed only six wickets in his first-class career. In three visits to England, Brown scored 18 centuries.

Upon returning to Australia, Bradman retired and Barnes took a break from cricket, thereby opening two vacancies in the Test team. Brown had a reasonable domestic season in 1948–49 to press his claim for a Test recall. He scored 626 runs at 41.73, the sixth highest aggregate of the season, with a century and three fifties. Queensland won two and lost three games. Despite this, the 37-year-old Brown was not named in the touring party for the Test tour of South Africa in 1949–50. In the absence of the Test players, Brown scored 507 runs at 50.70 in the Sheffield Shield season, with a top score of 190, making him the third highest run-getter. In their first five matches of the season, Queensland lost three times, before Brown's 190 in the last match against South Australia set up a nine-wicket win. It was his only century of the season after previously falling for 94 twice.

With his opportunities diminishing, he retired after captaining the Australian Second XI to New Zealand on an end-of-season tour, during which the team went undefeated. Most of the matches were not first-class but Brown scored his final first-class century against Otago, scoring 184 in an innings victory. He had been less effective in his later years, averaging 38.29 in Tests following World War II.

== Style ==
Bill Brown flicks a ball to the leg side.

Brown was regarded as a cautious starter who was reluctant to use his full array of strokes. He had an upright stance and was known for his trademark leg glancing and placement of the ball. He hooked occasionally and scored the majority of his off-side runs with the cut shot. Johnny Moyes said that "even when slow, he never wearied, as some do, because his style was cultured and free from jarring faults". Moyes felt that Brown's superior record on English soil was a result of the crowd attitude, which was more respectful. At Australian grounds, impatient spectators who disliked Brown's cautious batting frequently heckled him, blaming Brown for delaying Bradman's arrival to the crease. Moyes felt that the more serene English gallery allowed Brown to play to his game plan without hastening to placate impatient spectators. "A placid chap was Brown, and he liked to play in peaceful surroundings. When on the job he was as emotionless as a stoic." Moyes said that Brown was "always cool and thoughtful, he preferred finesse to force". The English journalist Neville Cardus commented "His cricket is perpetually keeping an appointment leisurely with moments to spare. Does the bat have an engagement this over with a half-volley? Very well, then, put it down in the book. We'll be there for it. Plenty of time." Bradman also noted Brown's ability to quickly get into position to play the ball, writing "One hallmark of good batting is that the player appears to have plenty of time in which to play his strokes. Bill Brown was an outstanding case of one who never seemed to be in a hurry for any stroke." Ray Robinson said that Brown was "the most serene batsman I ever saw play for Australia". Robinson said that "for artistry, Brown's leg-glancing could be mentioned in the same breath as Archie Jackson's". Brown's placid nature extended to his observations of modern cricket—he disliked the emotional displays made by contemporary players.

Brown's partnership with Fingleton is regarded as one of the great opening pairings in Australian Test cricket history. In ten Tests as an opening combination, the pair averaged 63.75 for the first wicket, higher than any other Australian duo with more than 1,000 runs. Brown was known for his self-effacing nature and was well liked among teammates and opponents alike. Of his batting, Brown joked that "My wife said you could always tell when I was batting by the number of people leaving the ground". During a domestic match at the Adelaide Oval in December 1938, he deflected a ball onto his stumps without dislodging a bail. He added a further 147 runs to end unbeaten on 174, eternally apologising for his luck.

In addition to his batting, Brown was a highly regarded fieldsman known for his fitness. He developed his skills through persistent training with professional sprinters in order to improve his anticipation and speed off the mark. Brown often fielded at slip or in the covers. With Australia boasting the leg spin pairing of O'Reilly and Clarrie Grimmett in the 1930s, close-catchers were frequently used. Along with Fingleton, Brown often fielded in the leg trap position.

== Off the field ==
In 1940, Brown married Barbara Hart, a receptionist. The couple had three sons, whom Brown self-deprecatingly noted were "well spaced ... like my centuries". Outside cricket, Brown worked in a variety of jobs. When Bradman relocated from New South Wales to South Australia in 1935, Brown took his job at the men's clothing store FJ Palmer. Following his relocation to Queensland, Brown was a Brisbane car salesman, selling Chevrolets for Eagers and later running a sports store.

Brown was a Queensland selector from 1950–51 to 1959–60, and an Australian selector in 1952–53 after defeating New South Wales' Chappie Dwyer in an election. He was the first Queenslander in 23 years to serve as a national selector. His brief tenure as a national selector was marked by abuse and harassment from parochial Queenslanders, upset that he did not include his fellow statesmen in the Test team. Brown's sports store was vandalised and he resigned as a selector within a year. In 1992, Brown was elected a life member of the Queensland Cricket Association, and in 2000 was awarded the Medal of the Order of Australia for his services to cricket.

Upon Bradman's death in February 2001, Brown became the oldest living Australian Test cricketer, greatly amused by the fame that came with the title. Highly regarded by Australian cricketers of the modern era, Steve Waugh invited Brown to present Test debutant Adam Gilchrist with his baggy green. The humble Brown was surprised, thinking himself an unworthy choice. Waugh disagreed, opining that "Bill is a baggy green icon who represents all that is good about playing for your country. He is humble, self-effacing and respectful, proud to have been afforded the honour of being an Australian Test cricketer, and a man who always looks for the positive in people." In March 2008, Brown died in Brisbane at the age of 95. He was the last surviving Invincible to have played Test cricket before World War II and his death left only four living members of Bradman's 1948 team.

In 2005 Brown was recognised as an outstanding Queenslander in the Queensland Greats Awards and in 2009 was inducted into the Queensland Sport Hall of Fame.

== Test match performance ==
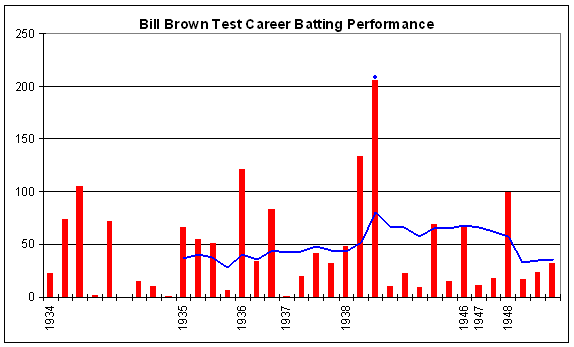
Bill Brown's Test career batting performance. The red bars indicate the runs that he scored in an innings, with the blue line indicating the batting average in his last ten innings. The blue dots indicate an innings where he remained not out.

		Batting			
Opposition	Matches	Runs	Average	High Score	100 / 50
England	13	980	42.60	206 not out	3/3
India	3	128	42.66	99	0/1
New Zealand	1	67	67.00	67	0/1
South Africa	5	417	59.57	121	1/4
Overall	22	1,592	46.82	206 not out	4/9

Preceded by Don Bradman	Australian Test cricket captains 1945/6	Succeeded by Don Bradman
