= Roy Scott =

New Zealand cricketer

- The New Zealand Test team, Christchurch, March 1947. Roy Scott is second from the left in the middle row, between Bert Sutcliffe and Colin Snedden.

Personal information
- Full name: Roy Hamilton Scott
- Born: 6 May 1917; Clyde, Otago, New Zealand
- Died: 5 August 2005 (aged 88); Christchurch, Canterbury, New Zealand
- Batting: Right-handed
- Bowling: Right-arm medium-pace

International information
- National side: New Zealand (1947)
- Only Test (cap 41): 21 March 1947 v England

Domestic team information
- Years: Team
- 1940-41 to 1954–55: Canterbury

Career statistics
Competition	Test	First-class
Matches	1	25
Runs scored	18	874
Batting average	18.00	24.97
100s/50s	0/0	0/6
Top score	18	86*
Balls bowled	138	5767
Wickets	1	94
Bowling average	74.00	25.97
5 wickets in innings	0	4
10 wickets in match	0	0
Best bowling	1/74	6/98
Catches/stumpings	0/-	13/-
- Source: Cricinfo, 1 April 2017

Roy Hamilton Scott (6 May 1917 – 5 August 2005) was a New Zealand cricketer who played in one Test in 1947.

== Cricket career ==
Scott was a middle-order right-handed batsman and a medium-pace bowler who played first-class cricket for Canterbury from 1940–41 to 1954–55. He had a good Plunket Shield season in 1946–47, making 86 against Otago and 85 against Auckland and taking 6 for 99 against Wellington in the three matches.

His single Test came at the end of that season when New Zealand played one Test against England led by Wally Hammond. The match was ruined by rain; Scott scored 18 batting at number eight and, opening the bowling with Jack Cowie, took one wicket, that of Bill Edrich.

He was picked for the trial match for the 1949 New Zealand tour of England but, despite top-scoring in the New Zealand XI's second innings and taking four wickets, he was not picked for the tour, and retired after the match, re-emerging for one more first-class match in 1953-54 and a final one in 1954–55.

== See also ==
- One-Test wonder
