= Len Butterfield =

New Zealand cricketer

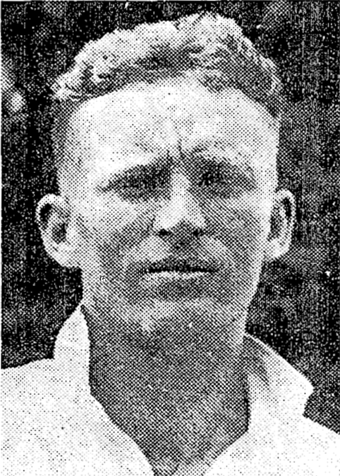
- Butterfield in 1940

Personal information
- Full name: Leonard Arthur Butterfield
- Born: 29 August 1913; Christchurch, New Zealand
- Died: 5 July 1999 (aged 85); Christchurch, New Zealand
- Batting: Right-handed
- Bowling: Right-arm fast-medium

International information
- National side: New Zealand (1946)
- Only Test (cap 36): 29 March 1946 v Australia

Domestic team information
- Years: Team
- 1934-35 to 1945-46: Canterbury

Career statistics
Competition	Test	First-class
Matches	1	18
Runs scored	0	589
Batting average	0.00	22.65
100s/50s	0/0	0/4
Top score	0	82
Balls bowled	78	2400
Wickets	0	38
Bowling average	–	19.65
5 wickets in innings	–	3
10 wickets in match	–	0
Best bowling	–	5/9
Catches/stumpings	0/–	13/–
- Source: Cricinfo, 1 April 2017

Leonard Arthur Butterfield (29 August 1913 – 5 July 1999) was a New Zealand cricketer who played in one Test in 1946. He later served as New Zealand's chief harness racing stipendiary steward.

== Cricket career ==
Butterfield made his first-class debut for Canterbury in 1934–35, and played three more matches in 1935-36 batting at various positions in the order from opening to number eight, without much success. He reappeared in 1943-44 as an all-rounder who batted in the middle order and opened the bowling, and took 5 for 24 to help Canterbury beat Auckland, followed by 5 for 47 in a victory over Wellington in the next match. He was selected to play for a New Zealand XI in a first-class match against a New Zealand Services XI shortly afterwards, and hit 40 batting at number nine, his highest score to date.

He hit the highest score of his career, 82, against Otago in 1944–45, and was selected for South Island against North Island at Auckland in the last match of the season. In a low-scoring match he scored 16 and 58 batting at number seven, and opening the bowling he took 3 for 47 in the first innings then, with his team trailing by 67, he took the first five wickets to fall in North Island's second innings, taking 5 for 9 (figures of 12–5–9–5) before having to leave the ground injured. North Island recovered somewhat after his departure, leaving South Island to get 262 for victory, but despite Butterfield's 58 and Ian Cromb's 62, they fell 34 runs short.

In 1945-46 he made 76 against Auckland and 69 against Otago, when he also had figures of 28.5–21–17–4 in the first innings. He was unsuccessful with bat or ball when Canterbury were defeated by the Australians in March, but he was selected for the Test that followed later that month in Wellington. He bowled economically without taking a wicket, and, batting at number seven, after Gordon Rowe at six (who also made a pair in his only Test), faced 10 balls in the match without scoring, falling Leg before wicket to Bill O'Reilly each time. It was his last first-class match.

== After cricket ==
Butterfield's father had been a horse trainer at Addington Raceway in Christchurch. After working as a plumber for some years, Butterfield began work with the Trotting Conference in 1946. From 1957 he served for 21 years as New Zealand harness racing's Chief Stipendiary Steward, retiring in 1978. While he was Chief Stipendiary Steward he made a study of drugs and how they affect horses.

== See also ==
- One-Test wonder
