= Melville Pengelly =

New Zealand cricket umpire

Personal information
- Full name: Melville Francis Pengelly
- Born: 17 March 1901; Christchurch, New Zealand
- Died: 24 September 1973 (aged 72); Wellington, New Zealand
- Nickname: Pen

Umpiring information
- Tests umpired: 4 (1946–1952)
- Source: Cricinfo, 14 July 2013

Melville Francis "Pen" Pengelly (17 March 1901 – 24 September 1973) was a New Zealand cricket umpire. He stood in four Test matches between 1946 and 1952.

Pengelly attended Christ's College, Christchurch, and played senior club cricket in Christchurch for St Albans. He took up umpiring in the 1930s and umpired 19 first-class matches between 1937 and 1955, most of them in Wellington. He umpired the first two Test matches in New Zealand after the Second World War: in Wellington in March 1946 and in Christchurch in March 1947, as well as two other Tests in 1951 and 1952.

== See also ==
- List of Test cricket umpires
