= Jack Cowie =

New Zealand cricketer

Jack Cowie OBE
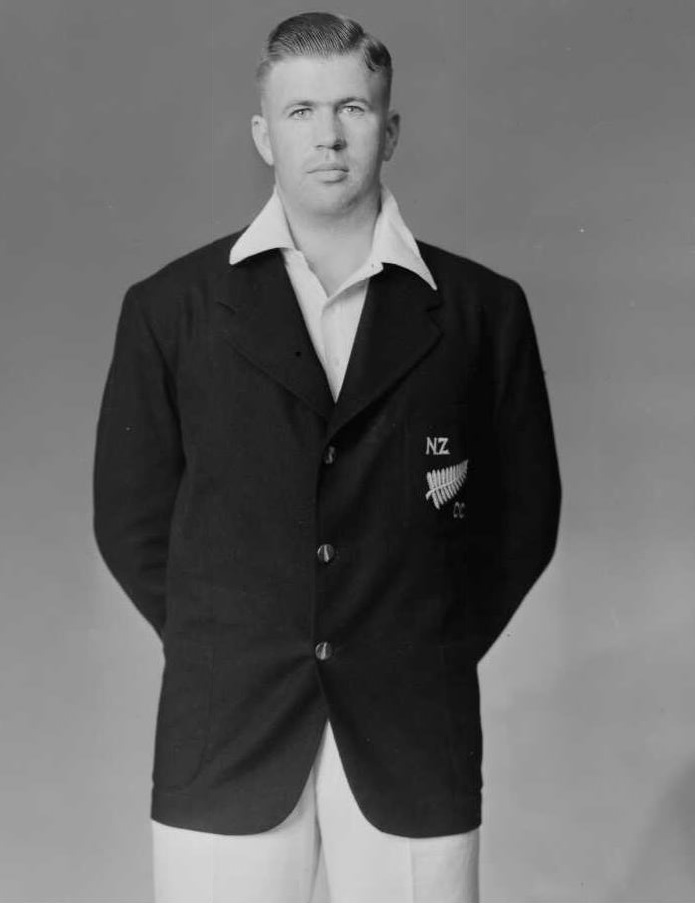

Personal information
- Full name: John Cowie
- Born: 30 March 1912; Auckland, New Zealand
- Died: 3 June 1994 (aged 82); Lower Hutt, Wellington, New Zealand
- Nickname: Bull
- Batting: Right-handed
- Bowling: Right-arm fast-medium
- Role: Bowler

International information
- National side: New Zealand (1937–1949)
- Test debut (cap 27): 26 June 1937 v England
- Last Test: 16 August 1949 v England

Domestic team information
- Years: Team
- 1932/33–1949/50: Auckland

Umpiring information
- Tests umpired: 3 (1956–1959)
- FC umpired: 18 (1955–1961)

Career statistics
Competition	Test	First-class
Matches	9	86
Runs scored	90	762
Batting average	10.00	10.16
100s/50s	0/0	0/1
Top score	45	54
Balls bowled	2,028	20,407
Wickets	45	359
Bowling average	21.53	22.28
5 wickets in innings	4	20
10 wickets in match	1	1
Best bowling	6/40	6/3
Catches/stumpings	3/–	35/–
- Source: CricketArchive, 19 June 2009

John Cowie OBE (30 March 1912 – 3 June 1994) was a New Zealand cricketer who played in nine Tests from 1937 to 1949. His Test opportunities were restricted by New Zealand's limited programme, and his cricket career was interrupted by World War II from 1939 to 1945. Following the 1937 tour of England, Wisden commented: "Had he been an Australian, he might have been termed a wonder of the age."

== Early cricket career ==
A lower-order right-handed batsman and a fast-medium right-handed bowler, Cowie played first-class cricket for Auckland from the 1932–33 season, appearing regularly in Plunket Shield matches from 1934 to 1935. According to his obituary in Wisden in 1995, he started as a batsman but converted himself into a bowler because the Auckland team had too many batsmen for him to be guaranteed a place. As a bowler, he relied on accuracy and the ability to move the ball after it pitched, and Wisden likened him to a latter-day New Zealand bowler, Richard Hadlee. But his success in domestic cricket was limited until the 1936–37 season, when he took 21 wickets in four first-class matches, and in the match against Wellington at Auckland took five wickets in an innings for the first time, finishing with five for 81.

This form won him a place in the 1937 New Zealand team to tour England under the captaincy of Curly Page.

== The 1937 England tour ==
Cowie was, in the words of Wisden's report, "the outstanding player of the team" on the 1937 tour. Having taken previously only 45 first-class wickets, he took 114 in England and Ireland, at an average of 19.95, heading the touring team's bowling figures for both average and aggregate. Wisden said that not only was he "a first-rate fast-medium bowler, but a bowler equal to anyone of his type in present-day cricket." It went on: "Some of Cowie's colleagues who had played with or against him in New Zealand were surprised at the pace off the pitch which he obtained on English wickets. A player with an enormous capacity for work, who seemed impervious to fatigue and was accurate in length and direction, he often bowled a vicious off-break and, as he could also make the ball 'lift' and swing away, he was a bowler to be feared."

Cowie hit form in England very quickly, taking five wickets in the first tour match, against Surrey. Against Oxford University, his first innings figures of six for 50 were the best so far in his career, and included four wickets for five runs in 21 balls. By the time of the first Test at the end of June, Cowie had 32 first-class wickets.

His Test debut, at Lord's, saw him take the wickets of England debutant openers, Leonard Hutton and Jim Parks, Sr., in both innings. Hutton made only one run in the two innings. Cowie also took the wickets of Charles Barnett and Bill Voce in the first innings to finish with four for 118 in the innings; his second innings figures, when England lost only four wickets before declaring, were two for 49. The match was drawn.

Immediately after the Lord's Test, Cowie took eight wickets, including a second innings five for 60, in the match against Somerset at Taunton. But he was less successful in other matches in mid-season and was given what Wisden termed "a well-earned rest" during the team's visit to Scotland in July.

The second Test of the series, at Manchester, was played in cold weather with frequent showers, and England won the match by, according to Wisden, "a comfortable margin". But the match was a triumph for Cowie, who took four England wickets for 73 in the first innings and six for 67 in the second to finish with match figures of 10 for 140. This was the first time a New Zealand bowler had achieved 10 wickets in a Test match, and the feat would not be equalled for 38 years. Wisden wrote: "He always bowled at the stumps and considering he was sometimes handicapped by the slow pitch and wet ball, his was a masterly performance."

Cowie picked up an injury in the next match against Surrey, and then missed a week's cricket. He returned to the team for the match with Essex and took three for 56 and five for 66, though he was overshadowed by Jack Dunning, who took 10 wickets in the game. In the two-day non-first-class match against Sir Julien Cahn's XI which followed, Cowie himself took 10 wickets, with five in each innings.

The third Test match at The Oval was badly affected by rain and was Cowie's least successful of the summer. Nevertheless, he took three of the seven England wickets to fall in the first innings, finishing the series with 19 wickets at an average of 20.78 runs per wicket. The second most successful New Zealand bowler was Giff Vivian, and he took only eight wickets, and this was also the tally for the highest England wicket-takers in the series.

Cowie maintained his good form through the remaining first-class matches of the tour. He took eight wickets in the match, including five for 36 in the second innings, against Combined Services; then five in the game with Hampshire and seven in both the Kent and Sussex matches. There were seven further wickets in the Folkestone festival match against "An England XI", the first of which was Cowie's 100th wicket of the season. And in the final game in England, against H. D. G. Leveson Gower's XI at Scarborough, he made 36 out of a ninth wicket stand of 74 with Tom Lowry, the highest score of his career so far.

There was a (very) short codicil to the New Zealanders tour of England: a first-class match against Ireland in Dublin. The match lasted only a single day, the first one-day finish in a first-class game for 12 years. Cowie took no wickets in the first Irish innings, when the home team was all out for 79; the New Zealanders replied with just 64. Ireland's second innings was disastrous: only three batsmen made any runs at all and of the total of 30, 10 were extras. Cowie bowled eight overs, conceded only three singles in them, and finished with figures of six wickets for three runs, which proved the best of his whole first-class career. He was, said Wisden, "well-nigh unplayable".

== Back in New Zealand ==
The New Zealand team played three matches in Australia on the way home after the 1937 tour of England. In the match against South Australia, Cowie had Don Bradman caught behind at the start of the second day's play; when people queuing outside the ground heard that Bradman was out, many decided not to attend the match, which severely damaged the gate takings. In the match against New South Wales, Cowie bowled Stan McCabe twice cheaply.

Thereafter Cowie's cricket was confined to New Zealand for the next 12 years through a combination of the Second World War and an extremely limited Test schedule. He continued to be a regular wicket-taker in the three domestic seasons before first-class cricket was suspended in New Zealand in 1940, but New Zealand played no Test matches in this period.

When regular first-class cricket resumed in New Zealand in 1945–46, the Australians sent a fairly strong team (though lacking Don Bradman) to play five first-class matches, and the match against New Zealand was recognised as a Test match. It was a low-scoring game, won easily by Australia inside two days. The New Zealanders made only 42 in their first innings and 54 in the second; in between, Australia made 199 for eight wickets before declaring, and Cowie took six of the eight wickets that fell at a personal cost of 40 runs. These were the best Test bowling figures of his career.

The following season, 1946–47, there was a further single Test match in New Zealand: the visitors on this occasion were the England team which had toured Australia, losing The Ashes series. In a rain-shortened match, New Zealand held their own and Cowie was prominent with both ball and, unusually, bat. In New Zealand's only innings, he made 45, his highest Test score, adding 64 for the ninth wicket with Tom Burtt. Then, starting with Cyril Washbrook in the first over, he took six of the seven England wickets to fall at a cost of 83 runs.

Limited domestic matches in the 1947–48 and 1948–49 seasons produced further wickets for Cowie though at a higher cost than usual. But he was an automatic selection for his second tour of England, with the 1949 team led by Walter Hadlee.

== The 1949 England tour ==
As in 1937, Cowie was one of the key players on the 1949 tour of England, though age – he was 37 – and a warm and dry summer did not help his figures. Wisden said that they did him "far less than justice". It went on: "For a bowler of his pace his consistency was remarkable... Another 25 or 30 wickets for the same number of runs would have given him an analysis more in keeping with his value."

For the first time in his cricket career, Cowie was affected by injuries during the tour. Wisden noted "minor strains" and he missed three weeks of the tour between the third and fourth Tests. The injuries meant that he played in only 18 of the 32 first-class matches of the tour, and he finished with 59 wickets at an average of 27.13 runs apiece. As ever, his batting was mostly negligible, though he made 47 in the first-class match against Scotland, a match in which he also took six Scottish wickets in the second innings at a cost of 66 runs, all six batsmen being bowled. His best bowling on the tour was in an early match against Leicestershire when he took six wickets for 54 runs.

Cowie played in all four Tests of the summer, all four matches being drawn. In the first game, he bowled 36 overs on the first day of the match and he was, said Wisden, "the only bowler who presented England with any serious problem". He took five wickets in the England first innings for 127 runs, but pulled a muscle in his leg so that he needed a runner while batting and was unable to bowl in England's second innings.

Fit again for the second Test, though he played in neither of the first-class matches in between, Cowie bowled a long spell in which he "maintained a perfect length at a fast pace and several times.. made the ball lift nastily". He tired in the heat, however, and finished with only two wickets for 64 runs. In the third match, he was part of an accurate New Zealand attack that had England struggling for runs, and took three for 98. In the fourth and final Test, again played in hot conditions, he shared the England wickets with Fen Cresswell, though his four wickets cost 123 runs and he was most effective late in the innings.

Cowie finished the Test series at the head of the New Zealand bowlers by average, his 14 Test wickets costing 32.21 runs each. The slow left-arm bowler Tom Burtt took 17 wickets, but they cost more than 33 runs each.

Towards the end of the tour, there was one more five-wicket innings for Cowie in the match against Middlesex. That proved to be his last significant bowling achievement in first-class cricket. He moved in his job in insurance to Wellington on his return from England and he appeared in the 1949-50 New Zealand domestic season in just one match for Auckland against a non-Test-playing Australian team, and then retired.

== After retirement ==
Cowie was a first-class umpire from 1955–56 to 1960–61. He officiated in one Test match in the 1955–56 season, and two in 1958–59. He still holds the record for the shortest gap between playing in and umpiring a Test Match - 6 years and 186 days.

He played soccer in the winter from the 1930s, acting as goalkeeper for Auckland for 14 seasons. He later served on the New Zealand Football Association as treasurer, chairman, and delegate to FIFA. From 1972 to 1978 he was president of the Oceania Football Confederation. In the 1972 Queen's Birthday Honours, he was appointed an Officer of the Order of the British Empire, for valuable services to cricket.

== Personal life ==
Cowie married Nyrie Wallen in 1936; they had two daughters. He worked for the T & G Mutual Life Assurance Society, an Australian and New Zealand insurance group, for 47 years, serving as an executive from 1967 to 1974.
