= Bill O'Reilly (cricketer) =

Australian cricketer (1905 – 1992)

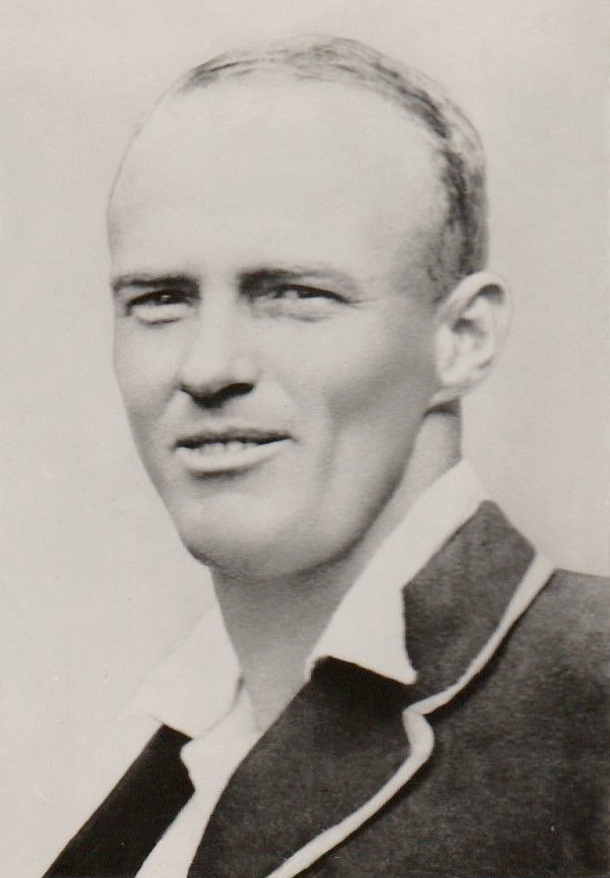
- O'Reilly in the 1930s

Personal information
- Full name: William Joseph O'Reilly
- Born: 20 December 1905; White Cliffs, New South Wales, Australia
- Died: 6 October 1992 (aged 86); Sutherland, New South Wales, Australia
- Nickname: Tiger
- Height: 6 ft 2 in (1.88 m)
- Batting: Left-handed
- Bowling: Right-arm leg break
- Role: Bowler

International information
- National side: Australia
- Test debut (cap 140): 29 January 1932 v South Africa
- Last Test: 29 March 1946 v New Zealand

Domestic team information
- Years: Team
- 1927/28–1945/46: New South Wales

Career statistics
Competition	Test	First-class
Matches	27	135
Runs scored	410	1,655
Batting average	12.81	13.13
100s/50s	0/1	0/1
Top score	56*	56*
Balls bowled	10,024	37,279
Wickets	144	774
Bowling average	22.59	16.60
5 wickets in innings	11	63
10 wickets in match	3	17
Best bowling	7/54	9/38
Catches/stumpings	7/–	65/–
- Source: CricketArchive, 19 August 2007

William Joseph O'Reilly OBE (20 December 1905 – 6 October 1992) was an Australian cricketer, rated as one of the greatest bowlers in the history of the game. Following his retirement from playing, he became a well-respected cricket writer and broadcaster.

O'Reilly was one of the best spin bowlers ever to play cricket. He delivered the ball from a two-fingered grip at close to medium pace with great accuracy, and could produce leg breaks, googlies, and top spinners, with no discernible change in his action. A tall man for a spinner (around 188 cm, 6 ft 2 in), he whirled his arms to an unusual extent and had a low point of delivery that meant it was very difficult for the batsman to read the flight of the ball out of his hand. When O'Reilly died, Sir Donald Bradman said that he was the greatest bowler he had ever faced or watched. In 1935, Wisden wrote of him: "O'Reilly was one of the best examples in modern cricket of what could be described as a 'hostile' bowler." In 1939, Wisden reflected on Bill O'Reilly's successful 1938 Ashes tour of England: "He is emphatically one of the greatest bowlers of all time."

As a batsman, O'Reilly was a competent right-hander, usually batting well down the order. O'Reilly's citation as a Wisden Cricketer of the Year in 1935 said: "He had no pretensions to grace of style or any particular merit, but he could hit tremendously hard and was always a menace to tired bowlers."

As well as his skill, O'Reilly was also known for his competitiveness, and he bowled with the aggression of a paceman. In a short biographical essay on O'Reilly for the Barclays World of Cricket book, contemporary England cricketer Ian Peebles wrote that "any scoring-stroke was greeted by a testy demand for the immediate return of the ball rather than a congratulatory word. Full well did he deserve his sobriquet of 'Tiger'."

== Youth and early career ==
Of Irish descent, O'Reilly's paternal grandfather Peter emigrated from County Cavan, Ulster in 1865. Arriving in Sydney, he had been a policeman for four years in Ireland and continued in this line of work in New South Wales. He was sent to Deniliquin in the Riverina, where he settled and married another Irish immigrant, Bridget O'Donoghue from Ballinasloe, County Galway. O'Reilly's father, Ernest, was a school teacher and moved around the areas surrounding the Murray River to study and teach. O'Reilly's mother Mina (née Welsh) was of mixed Irish and English descent, of a third generation family from Adelaide. O'Reilly was born in the opal mining town of White Cliffs. Ernest had been appointed to open the first school in the town, and had helped to build the school and its furniture himself. Bill was the fourth child in the family, with two elder brothers and a sister.

O'Reilly's cricket skills were largely self-taught; his family moved from town to town whenever his father was posted to a different school, he had little opportunity to attend coaching. He learned to play with his brothers, playing with a "gum-wood bat and a piece of banksia root chiselled down to make a ball." He learned to bowl because his older brothers dominated the batting rights. His bowling action was far from the classic leg spin bowler's run-up and delivery, indeed, according to Wisden, "he was asked to make up the numbers in a Sydney junior match and, with a method that at first made everyone giggle, whipped out the opposition". From a young age, O'Reilly was a tall and gangly player.

In January 1908, shortly after Bill had turned two, the family moved to Murringo, after Ernest was appointed the headmaster. O'Reilly said in his autobiography Tiger that the move played no vital part in his cricket education. The area had much more vegetation than the desolate White Cliffs, and an Irish Australian majority. O'Reilly later described the period as the happiest of his life. There the children played tennis on a court on their property and took up cricket. During this time, O'Reilly's mother gave birth to another son and two more daughters. In 1917, at the age of 12, the family moved to the town of Wingello. Ernest made the decision because there were no high schools near Murringo and his older children were about to finish primary school. Nevertheless, there was no high school in Wingello where Ernest had been appointed headmaster, so O'Reilly had to catch a train to Goulburn—50 km away—to study at the local public secondary school, where his elder brother Tom had been awarded a scholarship. Wingello was a cricket town and "everyone was a cricket crank" according to O'Reilly. It was here that he developed a passion for the game. O'Reilly played in the town's team and also won the regional tennis championships. O'Reilly bowled with an action reminiscent of the windmill that his family erected in the town. However, school life was difficult, especially in the winter, as the Southern Tablelands were harsh and cold. The O'Reilly children had to leave Wingello at 7.45 am by rail and caught a slow goods train that delivered them home at 7 pm; these vehicles did not provide protection against the weather, and the boys did not participate in any school sport as the only train home left after the end of classes.

In the early 1920s, O'Reilly's eldest brother Jack moved to Sydney. One afternoon, Jack watched spin bowler Arthur Mailey in the North Sydney practice nets and managed to describe the famous bowler's 'Bosie' action in a letter to Bill. O'Reilly claims to have perfected the action of changing the spin from anticlockwise to clockwise without any discernible hand movement within a couple of days. O'Reilly said that "The bosie became my most prized possession. I practised day in, day out". Ernest decided that the train journeys and frozen limbs were too much for his son, so he sent Bill to St Patrick's College, Goulburn as a boarder in 1921, where he quickly showed his athletic flair by becoming a member of the school's rugby league, tennis, athletics and cricket teams. He held a state record for the triple jump. At the same time, he also represented the town team. During his time at St Patrick's, O'Reilly developed his ruthless and parsimonious attitude towards bowling. After three years at the Irish Catholic school, funded by a scholarship, O'Reilly completed his Leaving Certificate.

== Sydney Teachers College ==
O'Reilly won a scholarship to the Sydney Teachers College at the University of Sydney, to train as a schoolmaster. However, the financial assistance was only for two years and merely sufficient for O'Reilly's rent at Glebe Point. When he was in Sydney, O'Reilly received an invitation to join an athletics club based on his performances in Goulburn, but was only able to join after the secretary Dick Corish waived his membership fee. Jumping 47 feet, he came second in a triple jump competition behind Nick Winter, who went on to win gold in the event at the 1924 Summer Olympics with a world record of 50 ft. O'Reilly also placed second in a high jumping competition, clearing six feet. Corish was also a cricket administrator and invited O'Reilly to play in a David Jones Second XI. Not knowing anything of his new recruit's abilities, Corish did not allow O'Reilly to bowl until he explicitly complained of only being allowed to field. O'Reilly promptly finished off the opposition's innings by removing the middle and lower order. After an encounter with journalist Johnny Moyes, who wrote glowingly about O'Reilly's skills.

While training as a teacher, O'Reilly joined the Sydney University Regiment, a unit of the Militia Forces (Army Reserve). He did not enjoy his time in the military, and along with most of his peers, regarded the commanding officer as inept. O'Reilly was a non-conformist who did not enjoy taking orders, and was unimpressed with the firearm drills, because the recruits were armed only with wooden sticks. However, he signed up for a second year to raise money for his education. Fed up with military routines he considered to be pointless, O'Reilly volunteered to be a kitchen hand.

During a vacation, O'Reilly caught the train from Sydney back to Wingello, which stopped at Bowral mid-journey. There, Wingello were playing the host town in a cricket match, and O'Reilly was persuaded to interrupt his journey to help his teammates. This match marked his first meeting with Bowral's 17-year-old Don Bradman, later to become his Test captain. O'Reilly himself later described thus:

How was I to know that I was about to cross swords with the greatest cricketer that ever set foot on a cricket field ? ... by the close of play, 17-year-old Don Bradman was 234 not out. The match resumed a week later, according to the local custom ... I bowled him first ball with a leg-break which came from the leg stump to hit the off bail. Suddenly cricket was the best game in the whole wide world.

The wicket ended a period of suffering for O'Reilly at the hands of Bradman, who had hit many fours and sixes from him. Bradman's counter-attack came after he had been dropped twice from O'Reilly's bowling before reaching 30 by Wingello's captain Selby Jeffery. On the first occasion, the ball hit Jeffery in the chest while he was lighting his pipe; soon after the skipper failed to see the ball "in a dense cloud of bluish smoke" as he puffed on his tobacco. The match was the start of a long on-field relationship between the pair, who were to regard one another as the best in the world in their fields. O'Reilly recalled that Bradman "knew what the game was all about".

O'Reilly did not enjoy his time at the overcrowded Sydney Teachers College (STC), decrying the lack of practical training and the predominance of pedagogical theory. Regarding it as a waste of time, he happily accepted an offer of work experience from Major Cook-Russell, the head of physical education at STC, to help at Naremburn College instead of attending lectures. This angered Professor Alexander Mackie, the head of STC, whom both Cook-Russell and O'Reilly regarded as incompetent.

O'Reilly's initial posting after abandoning his training was to a government school in Erskineville, an inner-city suburb in Sydney. At the time, the suburb was slum-like and impoverished, with many unruly students. Many of the pupils were barely clothed and tested O'Reilly's ability to discipline. He said that he learned more in three months there under Principal Jeremiah Walsh than he would have in ten years at STC. Major Cook-Russell then started a military cadet program in New South Wales schools; O'Reilly started such a program at Erskineville and his students won the statewide competition "in a canter". O'Reilly's time at Erskineville also marked the start of work-sport conflicts that hampered his cricket career. He joined North Sydney Cricket Club in 1926–27 and was selected at short notice to play in an invitational match under retired Australian captain Monty Noble at the Sydney Cricket Ground. As the education department required a week's notice for leave requests, O'Reilly declined, but was then ordered by the Chief Inspector of Schools to play after turning up at school on the morning of the match. Having taken six wickets, the match was then washed out, and O'Reilly then had his pay deducted, much to his chagrin.

== First-class career ==
=== Debut ===
O'Reilly was selected for the New South Wales practice squad based on his performance in a single match for North Sydney against Gordon in 1927–28. In this game, he bowled Moyes—a state selector—with a medium paced leg break. At state training, O'Reilly's new teammate and Test leg spinner Arthur Mailey advised him to adopt a more conventional grip, but the 19th century Test bowler Charles Turner, known as "Terror Turner" and famous for his unorthodox ways, told O'Reilly to back his self-styled technique. O'Reilly decided to listen to Turner.

After taking a total of 3/88 in a Second XI match against Victoria, O'Reilly made his first-class debut in the 1927–28 season, playing in three matches and taking seven wickets. In his first match, against New Zealand, O'Reilly took 2/37 and 1/53. He then played in what would be his only Sheffield Shield match for several years, going wicketless against Queensland, before returning figures of 4/35 against Tasmania.

=== Rural teaching post and absence from cricket ===
In 1928, O'Reilly was transferred by the New South Wales Education Department to Griffith, an outback town in the south-west of the state, and he was unable to play first-class cricket. Over the next three years he moved around the country, including postings to Rylstone and Kandos. Teaching duties may have cost O'Reilly an early entry into Test cricket, as many young players were introduced in the 1928–29 home series against England following a large number of retirements of older players. In the meantime, O'Reilly taught English to primary school children in Griffith, as well as singing—most of the pieces were Irish. At Rylstone he taught book-keeping and business, and he was promoted to the high school at Kandos. During this time he supplemented his income by travelling from town to town, playing in one-off cricket matches at the expense of the host's club. He worked on his bosie during the period and regularly dismissed outclassed opposition batsmen. O'Reilly regarded his cricketing isolation as highly beneficial as he regarded coaches to be ill-advised and detrimental to development.

=== Return to Sydney ===
In late 1930, O'Reilly was posted to Kogarah Intermediate High School in the southern Sydney suburb of Kogarah, where he taught English, history, geography and business. O'Reilly resumed playing for North Sydney, confident that with an improved bosie, he was much more potent than before his rural teaching stint. As he only arrived back in Sydney in the second half of the 1930–31 season, O'Reilly was not considered for first-class selection, but he took 29 wickets at 14.72 for North Sydney.

In the 1931–32 season he emerged as the successor to Mailey in the New South Wales side. Within half a dozen games, he was one of several young players introduced to the Australian cricket team for the Fourth Test in a badly one-sided series against South Africa. However, matters could have been rather different. O'Reilly had broken into the team for New South Wales' away matches against South Australia and Victoria while the Test players were on international duty. He totaled only 2/81 in the first match and was then informed that he would be dropped after the second fixture. O'Reilly responded by bowling with a more attacking strategy, taking 5/22 and 2/112. At the end of the match, New South Wales' stand-in captain, the leg spinning all rounder Reginald Bettington, declared O'Reilly "the greatest bowler in the world", and although few agreed with this claim, Bettington made himself unavailable for selection so that O'Reilly would not be dropped. The reprieved leg spinner took a total of 8/204 in his next two matches, and while the figures were not overwhelming, they were enough to ensure a Test berth; with an unassailable 3–0 lead, the selectors wanted to blood new players.

O'Reilly took four wickets on his debut at the Adelaide Oval, two in each innings, supporting the senior leg-spinner, Clarrie Grimmett, who took 14 wickets in the match and with Bradman scoring 299 not out, Australia won the match. O'Reilly retained his place when the selectors kept the winning side for the final match of the Test series at the Melbourne Cricket Ground. On a pitch made treacherous by rain, he did not bowl at all when South Africa were bowled out for just 36 in the first innings, and came on only towards the end of the second innings, when he took three wickets as the touring side subsided to 45 all out. He ended his first Test series with seven wickets at 24.85. In Sheffield Shield cricket in the 1931–32 season, O'Reilly took 25 wickets at an average of 21 runs per wicket, highlighted by his maiden ten-wicket haul, 5/68 and 5/59 in a home match against South Australia after the Tests were over as New South Wales took out the title. The following year he was more successful, taking 31 wickets at just 14 runs each. New South Wales won the competition in both seasons.

=== Test regular ===
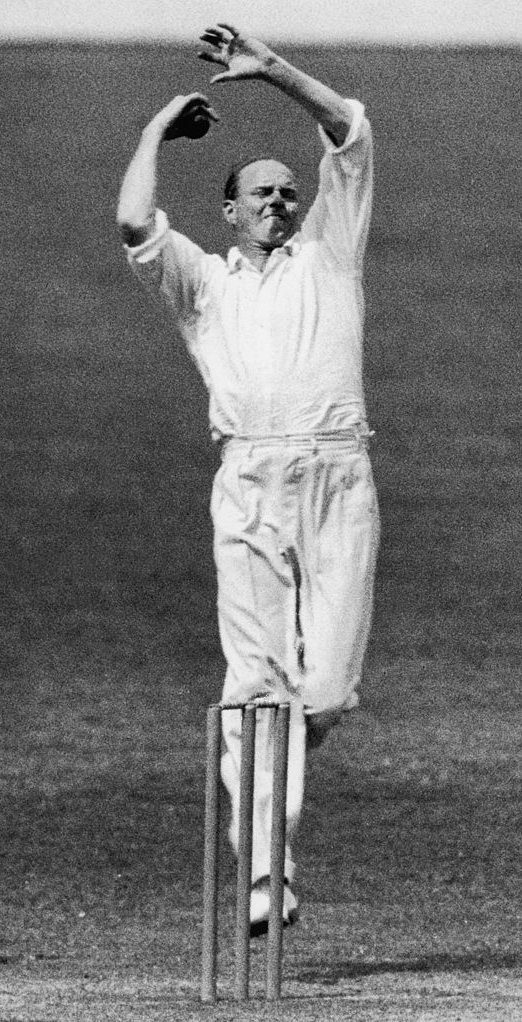
O'Reilly in mid-action, showing his unusual whirling arms

O'Reilly became a regular member of the Australian Test side in the 1932–33 season and he played in all five Tests against England in the infamous Bodyline series. The Australian selectors perceived that O'Reilly would be their key bowler, and as he had never played against the English, omitted him from the early tour matches so that the tourists would not be able to decode his variations. As a result, he missed the Australian XI match against the Englishmen in Melbourne. In two Shield matches ahead of the Tests, he took 14 wickets, including a total of 9/66 in an innings win over Queensland. Although the national selectors had hidden him from the Englishmen, New South Wales declined to do so, and he played for his state a week ahead of the Tests. The hosts were bombarded with short-pitched bowling and heavily beaten by an innings; O'Reilly took 4/86 as the visitors amassed 530, dismissing leading English batsman Wally Hammond in the first of many battles between the pair.

The Tests started at the SCG and O'Reilly was the team's leading wicket-taker for the series with 27 wickets. O'Reilly not only took most wickets but he also bowled by some distance the most overs on either side, and he achieved a bowling economy of less than two runs from each of his 383 eight-ball overs. In the first match, he took 3/117 from 67 overs as England amassed 530 and took a ten-wicket victory. While his figures suggested that he bowled poorly—none of his wickets were those of batsmen—he beat the batsmen repeatedly. Between Tests, O'Reilly took 11 wickets in two Shield matches.

In the Second Test in Melbourne, O'Reilly opened the bowling as Australia opted to use only one pace bowler on a turning pitch. After Australia had made only 228, O'Reilly trapped Bob Wyatt leg before wicket (lbw) before bowling both the Nawab of Pataudi and Maurice Leyland to leave England at 4/98. He later took two tail-end wickets to end with 5/63 and secure Australia a first innings lead. Defending a target of 251, O'Reilly bowled the leading English opener Herbert Sutcliffe for 33 with a textbook perfect leg break that pitched on leg stump and clipped the top of the off stump. According to English team manager Plum Warner, Sutcliffe had never been defeated so comprehensively. O'Reilly also removed Hammond on the way to ending with 5/66 and securing a 111-run win. The ten-wicket haul was O'Reilly's first at Test level and the start of his strong career record over the English. However, Australia were not to taste further success. The controversial "fast leg theory" bowling used by England under newly appointed captain Douglas Jardine brought the touring team victories in the last three matches: Australia were handicapped not only by the tactics, but also by a lack of quality fast bowlers; O'Reilly also opened the bowling in both the Third and Fourth Tests in Adelaide and Brisbane respectively due to the selection of only one paceman. He was hindered by a decline in the form of Grimmett, who was dropped after the Third Test. O'Reilly took 2/83 and 4/79 in Adelaide, collecting the wicket of Sutcliffe for single figures in the first innings of a match overshadowed by near-riots after captain Bill Woodfull was struck in the heart. Australia were crushed by 338 runs, and lost the series in Brisbane. After O'Reilly had taken 4/101—including Sutcliffe and Jardine—in the first innings to keep Australia's first innings deficit to 16, the hosts collapsed to be 175 all out. O'Reilly took one wicket in the second innings of a six-wicket loss. The final Test in Sydney took a similar course; O'Reilly took 4/111 in the first innings including Sutcliffe and Jardine again, as the tourists took a 14-run lead before completing an eight-wicket win after another Australian collapse. O'Reilly was wicketless in the second innings and bowled 72 overs in total in the match. Reflecting on the performance of O'Reilly in the series, R Mason said "here we saw the first flexing of that most menacing genius".

In the 1933–34 season, with no Test series in Australia, O'Reilly finished top of the Sheffield Shield bowling averages, taking 33 wickets at an average of 18.30, but he had an inconsistent run. He started the season with 6/58 and 7/53 in an innings win over Queensland. After managing only three wickets across two consecutive testimonial matches, O'Reilly went wicketless against South Australia. He was angered by the subsequent comments in newspapers that he had already passed his zenith, and returned to form against Victoria at the MCG. After claiming 3/92 in the first innings, he took 9/50 in the second innings. The nine wickets included six Test players, including leading batsmen Woodfull and Bill Ponsford. Given his heavy workload in the previous season, it was decided to keep O'Reilly fresh for the subsequent tour of England, so he played in only two of the last three matches, with a reduced bowling load, taking eight wickets. During the season, Bradman moved to North Sydney from St George Cricket Club to captain the team, and it was the only summer in which O'Reilly played alongside Bradman at grade level. The following year, O'Reilly moved to St George, which was near Kogarah, as they were obliged to play for a team in their area of residence.

O'Reilly was selected for the tour of England in 1934, where he and Grimmett were the bowling stars as Australia regained the Ashes. They began by taking 19 of the 20 England wickets to fall in a comfortable victory in the First Test at Trent Bridge. O'Reilly's match figures were 11 wickets for 129 runs, and taking seven for 54 in his second innings was to produce his best Test figures.

England then won the Second Test at Lord's, aided by the weather and Australia's inability to force the issue by avoiding the follow on. The hosts batted first and made 440, O'Reilly removing Walters. In reply, Australia were 2/192 when rain struck on the second evening and the sun turned the pitch into a sticky wicket the next day. When O'Reilly came in at 8/273, only 17 runs were needed to avoid the follow on, but he misjudged the flight of a Hedley Verity delivery and was bowled, thinking the ball to be fuller than it was and missing a lofted drive. Australia fell six runs short and were forced to bat again when the pitch was at its worst. They were bowled out again on the same afternoon as Verity took 14 wickets in a day. O'Reilly always regretted his dismissal, as he believed that if he had helped to avoid the follow on, he would have taken "six wickets without removing his waistcoat" and that Australia could have then chased the target in better conditions on the fourth day.

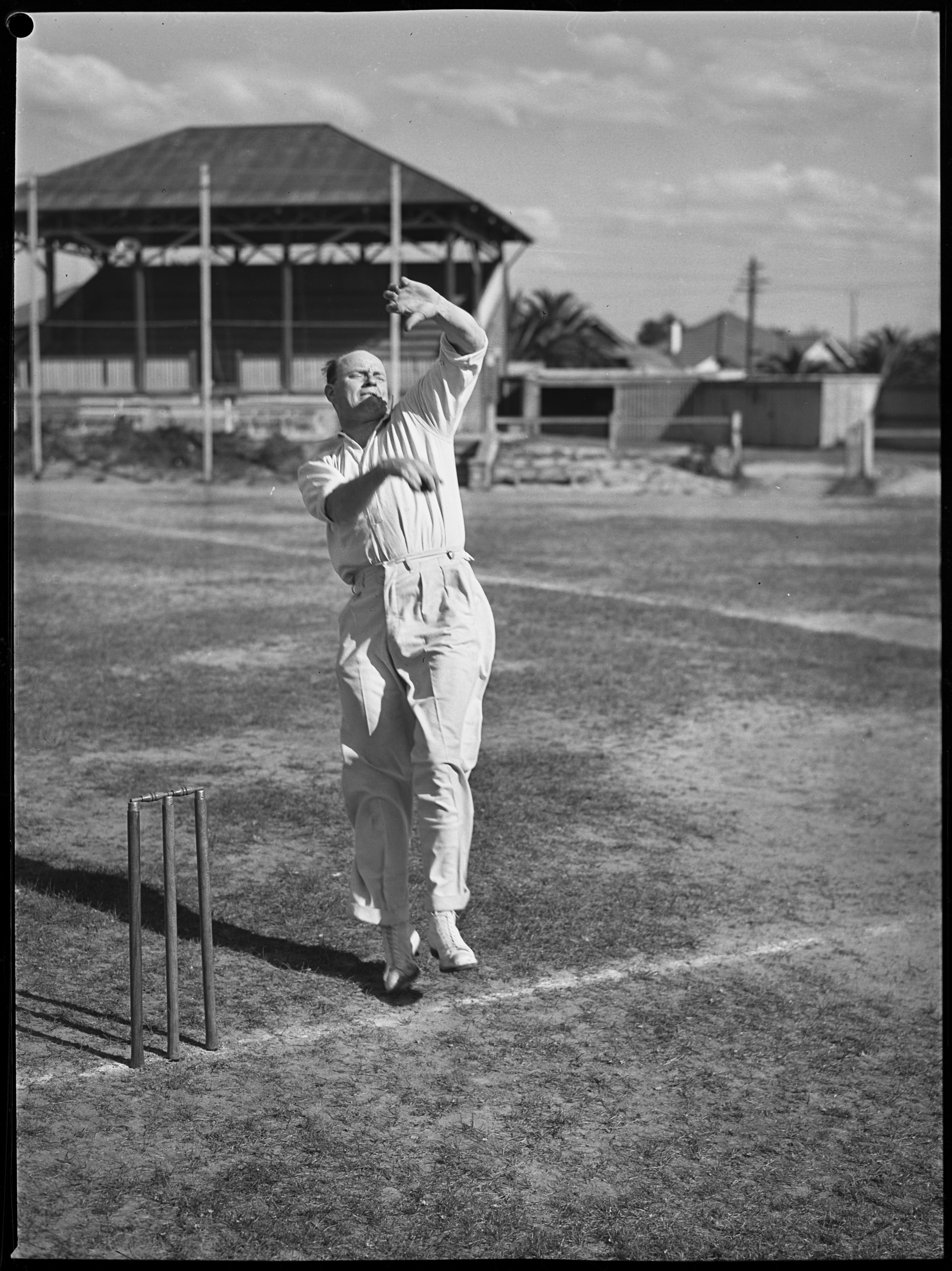
Bill O'Reilly demonstrating his bowling technique, 1945

O'Reilly shook English confidence in the Third Test, played on a placid surface at Old Trafford, by taking three wickets in four balls. Cyril Walters, who up to that point had been untroubled, failed to pick the bosie and thus inside edged the ball to short leg. Bob Wyatt came in and was clean bowled for a golden duck, bringing Hammond in to face the hat-trick ball. The new batsman inside edged the ball past the stumps and through the legs of wicket-keeper Bert Oldfield, but the next delivery clean bowled him. This left England at 3/72, and O'Reilly removed Sutcliffe soon after, but the batsmen settled down and the next wicket did not come until Hendren fell just before the end of the first day's play. England were 5/355 and O'Reilly had taken each wicket. The next day, the hosts ended on 9/627, despite a relentless 59 overs from O'Reilly, who ended with 7/189 and was the only bowler to challenge the batsmen. The high-scoring match never looked likely to produce a result, except when Australia were in danger of being forced to follow on. They were 55 runs away from the follow on mark of 478 at the end of the third day with two wickets in hand, and O'Reilly was on one. The next day Arthur Chipperfield fell with 24 runs still needed and O'Reilly and Wall saw them to 491 before the latter fell. O'Reilly ended with 30 not out after an innings in which he was lucky not to be caught off an edge multiple times.

A further draw at Headingley, with England saved by rain after a Bradman triple century, set up a match to decide the series at The Oval. As the series was still alive, the match was timeless, rather than the customary five-day contest. After Australia made 701, O'Reilly took 2/93 to help dismiss the hosts for 321. The visitors then made 327 to set a target of 708 for victory. O'Reilly claimed 2/58, including Hammond, while Grimmett, with a total of eight wickets, proved the decisive bowler as Australia regained The Ashes with victory by 562 runs, which, more than 70 years on, is still the second largest margin of victory in terms of runs in any Test match.

O'Reilly was the leading Australian bowler of the tour, taking 28 Test wickets at an average of less than 25, while Grimmett took 25 wickets at just under 27 runs apiece. Australia's other Test bowlers took only 18 wickets between them. On the tour as a whole, O'Reilly headed the tourists' averages, with 109 wickets at 17.04, which meant that he also topped the averages for the whole English cricket season. In the matches against the English counties, he took 11 wickets in each of the games against Leicestershire and Glamorgan, and in the match against Somerset, after Hans Ebeling took the first wicket, he took the remaining nine for 38 runs, and that proved to be the best innings figures of his career. He was named as one of the Wisden Cricketers of the Year in 1935 for his deeds on tour.

The tour ended with two non-first-class matches in Scotland against the hosts, and O'Reilly top-scored in a match for Australia for the only time, in the first of the two games. Having been allowed to open the innings after complaining about his lack of opportunities, he top-scored with 47 ahead of McCabe's 16. He found the tour to be a happy and healing experience after the acrimony of the Bodyline series.

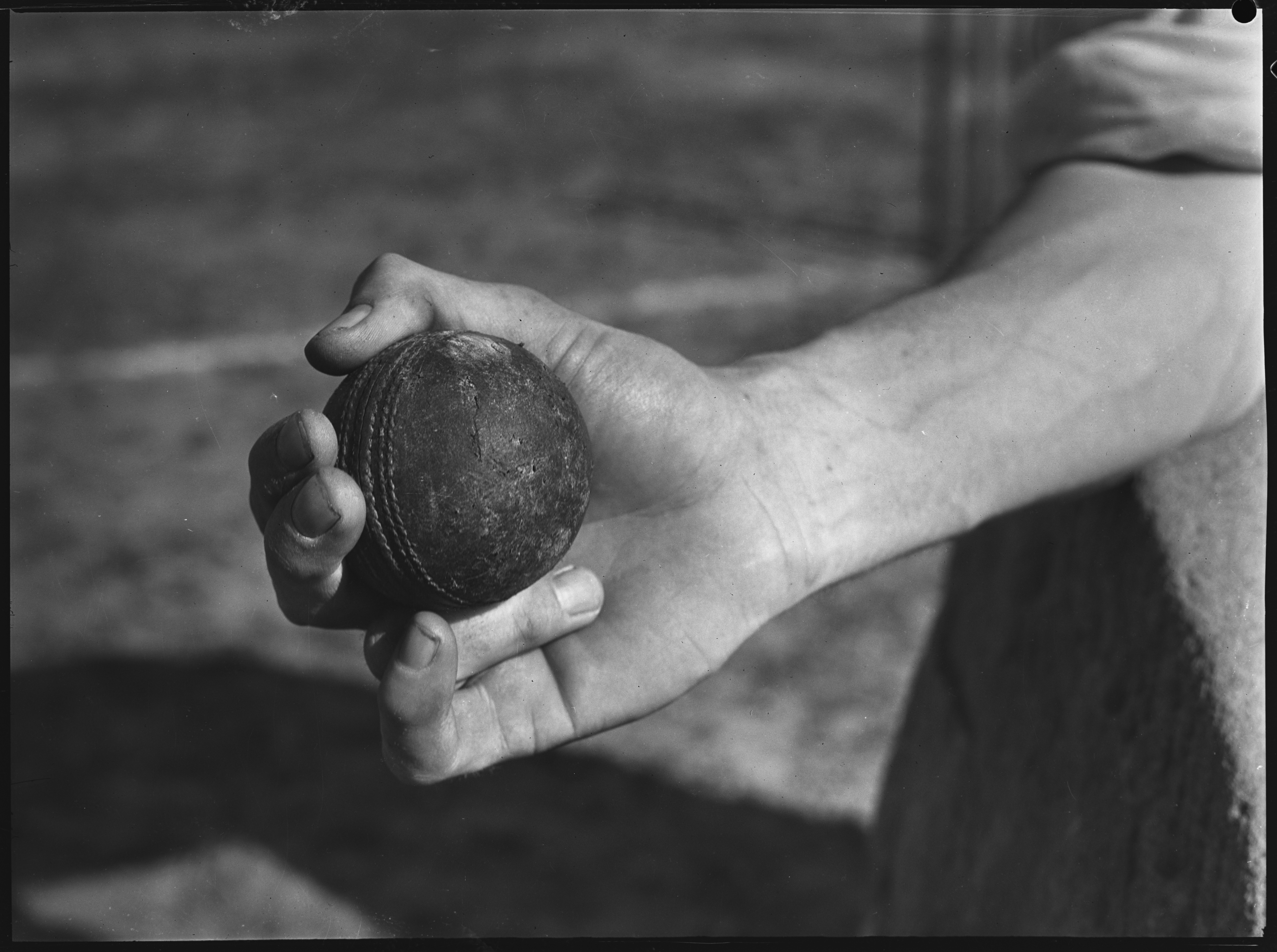
The famous unorthodox bowling grip of Bill O'Reilly

O'Reilly played little state cricket for New South Wales in 1934–35; at the time, his first child was born and he took time off to ponder his future employment. He played in only one Shield match, against arch-rivals Victoria, and in the testimonial match for the retiring Woodfull and Ponsford. He took a total of eight wickets at 31.37 in these matches.

O'Reilly played no Shield cricket the following season, when he was selected for the Australian tour to South Africa. Although Bradman had been vice-captain under Woodfull in 1934, he did not travel to South Africa on grounds of ill health, but played a full domestic season despite this. The team was captained by Victor Richardson, and O'Reilly publicly described it as the happiest tour he had been on—he was one of several players who did not get along with Bradman.

The tour was another triumph for the leg-spin attack of O'Reilly and Grimmett, but O'Reilly was slightly overshadowed by his teammate in the Tests. With 44 wickets, Grimmett set a new record for the number of wickets by an Australian in a Test series, and he raised his Test career total to 216 wickets, beating the then world record of 189 by Englishman Sydney Barnes. O'Reilly took 27 Test wickets at an average of just over 17 runs each: the other bowlers in the Australian team took 27 wickets between them. On the tour as a whole, O'Reilly came out ahead of Grimmett, with 95 wickets against Grimmett's 92, and an average of 13.56 against 14.80. O'Reilly also revealed hitherto undiscovered batting talents, making an undefeated 56 in the Fourth Test in Johannesburg, and putting on 69 for the last wicket with Ernie McCormick. It was the only time in his first-class cricket career that he passed 50. During the tour, O'Reilly developed his leg trap; the opening batsmen Jack Fingleton and Bill Brown were used in these positions.

=== Senior bowler ===
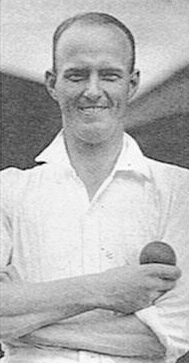
Bill O'Reilly, ca. 1930

With Bradman's appointment as captain of the Australian team after the South African tour, Clarrie Grimmett was dropped, leaving O'Reilly as the hub of the Australian bowling attack for the MCC Ashes tour in 1936–37.

O'Reilly was strongly aggrieved by the removal of his long-time bowling partner, and maintained that it was an "unpardonable" error that heavily weakened Australia's bowling attack. However, he remained vague about why he thought Grimmett had been removed, even though suspicion dogged Bradman. Grimmett continued to dominate the wicket-taking on domestic cricket, while his replacements struggled in the international arena.

O'Reilly responded by becoming the leading Australian wicket-taker in the series taking 25, with Bill Voce taking 26 for England. However, he almost failed to take to the field; O'Reilly and several players had threatened to withdraw after vice-captain Stan McCabe's wife was forbidden from sitting in the Members' Stand in the First Test. The Australian Board of Control backed down, but it was the start of a tumultuous season.

O'Reilly's wickets were at increased cost—his average increased to 22 runs per wicket—and he took five wickets in an innings only once, in the First Test at the 'Gabba in Brisbane, which England won convincingly. The circumstances of the series determined O'Reilly's role: after England won the first two Tests, O'Reilly appeared to have been given the job not just of bowling the opposition out, but also of containing them, and he was criticised in Wisden for defensive bowling. Wisden even went as far as to describe it as "leg theory". If the intention was to stifle England batsman Wally Hammond in particular, then it appears to have worked, but O'Reilly's figures for the series suggest he was consistent but not always penetrative. Morris Sievers, from fewer matches, outperformed his average; Leslie Fleetwood-Smith, a slow left-arm spinner, got more eye-catching individual figures, including 10 wickets in the victory at Adelaide. Whatever the methods, they were successful: having lost the first two Tests, Australia proceeded to win the final three to retain The Ashes they had regained in England in 1934, and O'Reilly's five for 51 and three for 58 were the best figures in the decisive Fifth Test in Melbourne.

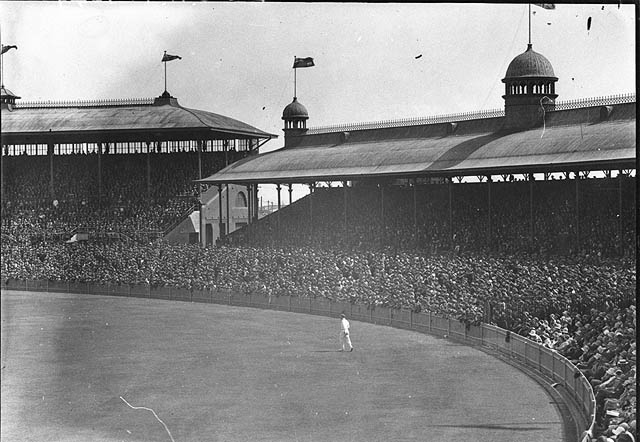
O'Reilly's home ground, The SCG, in the 1930s

In the 1937–38 season, O'Reilly returned to more regular state cricket, and New South Wales duly won the Sheffield Shield for the first time in five seasons. He took 33 wickets at an average of just over 14 runs each, and against South Australia at Adelaide he repeated his feat against Somerset in 1934, taking the last nine wickets of the first innings at a cost of 41 runs. This time, he followed up with five for 57 in the second innings.

=== 1938: Final tour of England ===
O'Reilly's second and final Ashes tour to England as a player in 1938 again saw him as the most effective bowler in the team. His final record of 22 wickets at an average of 27.72 in the four Tests—the Third Test was rained off without a ball being bowled—was marginally less than 1934, and in all matches he took 104 wickets at 16.59. In its report of the tour, however, Wisden's 1939 edition noted that "it was nothing short of remarkable that despite the moderate support accorded to him he bowled so consistently well and so effectively." Again, O'Reilly was often used defensively where there was no help from the wicket, but, Wisden added, "when... the wicket gave him the least encouragement he robbed the greatest batsmen of initiative, and was most destructive".

O'Reilly took 3/164 on a batting paradise in the First Test at Trent Bridge as England scored 8/658 and forced Australia to follow on and hold on for a draw. In the Second Test at Lord's O'Reilly took 4/93 in the first innings and trapped Eddie Paynter for 99 to end a 222-run partnership with Hammond. In reply to England's 494, Australia were in danger of being forced to follow on; O'Reilly came in and made 42, featuring in a partnership of 85 in only 46 minutes with Bill Brown that enabled Australia to save the match: having been dropped by Paynter, he hit Hedley Verity for consecutive sixes to take Australia past the follow-on mark. Brown recalled "It was a nice day, and a nice wicket. O'Reilly came in, and I told him I'd take the quicks—Wellard and Farnes—and Tiger [O'Reilly] took Verity." Australia reached 422 and O'Reilly took 2/53 in the second innings as the match petered into a draw.

In an otherwise high-scoring series, O'Reilly's greatest triumph was in the low-scoring Fourth Test at Headingley, where he exploited a difficult pitch to take five wickets in each innings as Australia secured the victory that enabled them to retain the Ashes. With the series level at 0–0, England captain Hammond elected to bat first; O'Reilly's 5/66 was largely responsible for ending England's innings at 223. He removed Hammond, who had top-scored with 76, Bill Edrich and Denis Compton, all bowled in quick succession. England were 1/73 on the third day, an overall lead of 54, when O'Reilly began a new spell after Bradman had switched his ends. Joe Hardstaff junior hooked him for four and the next ball was no-balled by the umpire. O'Reilly was reported to have become visibly enraged; he bowled Hardstaff next ball and then removed Hammond for a golden duck. This precipitated an English collapse to 123 all out, and O'Reilly ended with 5/56 and a total of 10/122. O'Reilly effort proved to be crucial as Australia scraped home by five wickets just 30 minutes before black clouds brought heavy rain, which would have made batting treacherous. The victory ensured the retention of the Ashes, and O'Reilly ranked it as his finest performance, alongside his ten wickets in the Second Bodyline Test of 1932–33.

Australia had retained the Ashes, but England struck back at The Oval, where they posted the then-record Test score of 7/903. Early on, O'Reilly trapped Edrich lbw for 12, to secure his 100th Test wicket against England. In a timeless match, Len Hutton made a world record Test score of 364 in a fastidious and watchful innings of 13 hours, surpassing Bradman's 334. When he was on 333, O'Reilly deliberately bowled two no-balls in an attempt to break Hutton's concentration by tempting him to hit out, but the Englishman blocked them with a straight bat.

O'Reilly eventually removed Hutton and ended with 3/178 off 85 overs. Nevertheless, these compared favourably with Fleetwood-Smith's 1/298 off 87 overs. O'Reilly was the only Australian to take more than a solitary wicket, and rated Hutton's knock as the finest innings played against him. Australia collapsed to lose by an innings and 579 runs, the heaviest defeat in Test history. O'Reilly's lack of success went with The Oval Test in 1934, when he took a total of 4/151.

O'Reilly scaled back his participation in Sheffield Shield cricket in the 1938–39 season, making himself unavailable for most of the campaign to spend time with his newborn son after half a year in England; he played in only two matches, against South Australia and arch-rivals Victoria. He took a ten-wicket haul in the latter match, but his figures of 6/152 and 4/60 were not enough to prevent defeat. Both teams were at full strength and eight of O'Reilly's victims were Test players, including batsman Lindsay Hassett twice. O'Reilly's only other match was for Bradman's XI against Rigg's XI in a match to commemorate the centenary of the Melbourne Cricket Club, in which he took a total of 7/129, to end the season with 19 wickets at 23.16.

He resumed regular service for New South Wales in the next season, taking 55 wickets at 15.12 in seven matches. He took 8/23 and 6/22 to set up an innings win over Queensland and 6/77 and 4/62 in another victory over South Australia. The two matches against Victoria were shared as O'Reilly took 17 wickets. In the second of the matches, in Sydney, Hassett became the only person to score centuries in both innings of match involving O'Reilly. Despite Hassett's feat, New South Wales won the match; O'Reilly took a total of 8/157.

O'Reilly continued his strong run in 1940–41, taking 55 wickets at 12.43 in eight matches. He took nine wickets in three consecutive matches, once for McCabe's XI in a match against Bradman's XI, which his team won by an innings, and in both matches against Victoria, which were split between the two states. First-class cricket was ended after one match in 1941–42; O'Reilly took a total of 9/124 in a loss to Queensland before the attack on Pearl Harbor signaled the start of World War II in the Pacific. In the meantime, O'Reilly continued to play for St George and topped the grade competition's bowling averages for years from 1941 to 1942 onwards. He averaged between 8 and 9 in all these seasons, and took more than 100 wickets in three consecutive summers, peaking with 147 in 1943–44. O'Reilly had tried to enlist in the military in 1941, but after presenting himself for the medical, was informed that his employer was deemed a "protected undertaking", so their workers were not allowed to enlist.

First-class cricket resumed in Australia in 1945–46 after the end of the war, although the Shield competition was not held that season. O'Reilly captained New South Wales at the age of 40, and although the emergence of Ray Lindwall and Ernie Toshack in the state side indicated a shift in emphasis away from spin and towards faster bowling, O'Reilly maintained his pre-war standards. He took 33 wickets at 14.36 in six matches and New South Wales were undefeated; they won four matches and drew both fixtures against Victoria. He took at least two wickets in every innings and claimed his innings best of 6/43 against Queensland. O'Reilly also took a match total of 7/94 in an innings win over the Australian Services team, which had drawn a series against a full-strength England team.

O'Reilly's final first-class cricket came on a four-match tour by an Australian team to New Zealand in early 1946. O'Reilly was the vice-captain of the team, which was led by Bill Brown. The main fixture during the tour was a four-day match against a representative New Zealand side in Wellington, retrospectively designated as the first Test between the two countries in 1948. The uncertain nature of the tour saw the Australians wear blazers labelled ABC for Australian Board of Control, rather than the usual coat of arms. New Zealand were outclassed; after winning the toss and electing to bat on a rain-affected pitch, they made 42 in their first innings and 54 in their second to lose by an innings and 103 runs. O'Reilly took 5/14 in the first innings, and 3/19 in the second, dominating with Toshack. It was his last Test and his last first-class game. O'Reilly dominated in the other tour games as well; he took match totals of 9/103 and 8/128 against Auckland and Otago respectively, and ended with 28 wickets at 10.60 for the tour. Having only decided to tour New Zealand after much consideration, O'Reilly retired at the end of the Test, throwing his boots out of the dressing room window.

== Conflict with Bradman ==
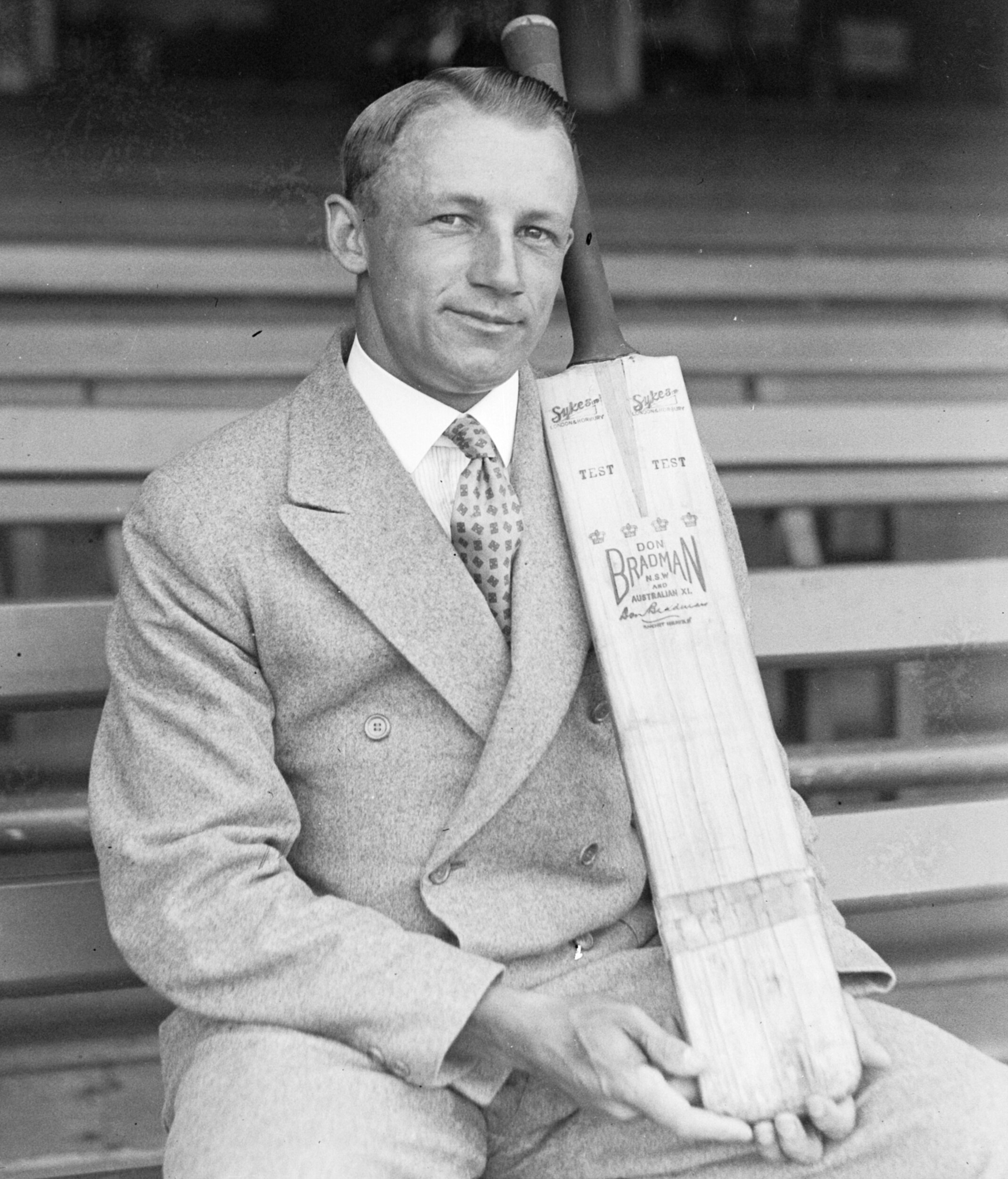
Don Bradman, O'Reilly's Test captain

Despite the mutual admiration between Bradman and O'Reilly for their cricket skills, personal relations between the pair were strained. In Australian society at the time, sectarian tension existed between Catholics, mostly of Irish descent, of whom O'Reilly was one, and Protestants, like Bradman. Bradman was a non-drinker and a reserved character, often preferring to read quietly, rather than socialize or drink with his teammates. Coupled with his on-field dominance, this led to perceptions that Bradman was cocky and distant from his teammates. In the late 1930s, the Australian Board of Control summoned O'Reilly, Stan McCabe, Leo O'Brien and Chuck Fleetwood-Smith, all Catholics of Irish descent to a meeting to discuss the apparent schism in the team. Jack Fingleton, a trained journalist, was not invited to the meeting, but after the deaths of both Fingleton and O'Reilly, Bradman penned a letter in which he accused the former of being the ringleader. O'Reilly's eventual departure also raised speculation that a purge had occurred. In 1995, after both Fingleton and O'Reilly had died, Bradman wrote: "With these fellows out of the way, the loyalty of my 1948 side was a big joy and made a big contribution to the outstanding success of that tour"; the Australians went through the 1948 English summer undefeated.

O'Reilly became a journalist, and together with Fingleton, he often criticised Bradman. They were in the press box when Bradman was bowled for a duck in his final Test innings, when they were reported to have become hysterical with laughter. Nevertheless, O'Reilly kept most of his strongest feelings about Bradman to himself and suppressed them from his autobiography; he would say of Bradman that "You don't piss on statues". Before his death, O'Reilly gave a series of interviews to the National Library of Australia, in which he accused Bradman of purging Grimmett from the team because Grimmett had joked that Bradman had ensured his own dismissal in a match against Victoria, to avoid facing the express pace of Ernie McCormick.

According to cricket historian Gideon Haigh, "O'Reilly was a man of embedded prejudices". In retirement, O'Reilly complained to a board member that "You have to play under a Protestant to know what it's like". The Test umpire Col Egar recalled that O'Reilly never talked to him in their decades in cricket until a third party informed the bowler that Egar was a Catholic.

Despite their conflicts, a few years before his death O'Reilly wrote that, compared with Bradman, batsmen like Greg Chappell and Allan Border were mere "child's play".

== Off-field life, mentoring and legacy ==
In 1933, O'Reilly married Mary Agnes "Molly" Herbert, after less than six months of courtship. Of Irish stock, Molly had been introduced to O'Reilly through one of his teaching colleagues at Kogarah, who married Molly's elder sister the following year. The couple then moved to the southern Sydney suburb of Hurstville. The couple had two children, a girl followed by a boy.

O'Reilly continued to work as a school teacher after he broke into international cricket, but at the end of 1934, after missing more than six months of the year in England, he resigned from his government post, reasoning that his career could not progress if he was going to be overseas so often. However, he had not made any plans for his future employment. Soon after, O'Reilly received an offer to work as a sportsgoods salesman for the department store David Jones with sporting leave entitlements. The Premier of New South Wales, Bertram Stevens, tried to coax O'Reilly into staying in the government education system, offering him a post at Sydney Boys High School if he returned to STC to complete the Bachelor of Arts that he had abandoned a decade before.

In 1935, O'Reilly took up an appointment at Sydney Grammar School, one of the leading private schools in the state, having been offered 50% paid leave for his cricket commitments. There he taught English, history and business. In 1939 he took a job in the sports store of close friend, teammate and fellow Irish Catholic Stan McCabe, which was located on George Street, the city centre's main thoroughfare. O'Reilly was a financial partner in the business, but following the outbreak of World War II, the sales revenue began to suffer and O'Reilly left as the store would not be able to support two stakeholders.

O'Reilly then accepted a position as a manager of the Lion Tile Company at Auburn, in Sydney's western suburbs. He remained in the position until 1976. O'Reilly was responsible for the financial and accounting affairs of the firm, which expanded to employ more than 200 workers. He was held in high regard and granted full paid leave when he thrice went overseas for six months to cover tours of England as a journalist. Doc Evatt, a leading Australian Labor Party politician attempted to recruit O'Reilly into politics, but was unsuccessful.

During the late-1930s, O'Reilly mentored the then-teenaged Arthur Morris and Ray Lindwall at St. George. He converted Morris from a left arm unorthodox spinner into an opening batsman, and exhorted Lindwall to become a specialist express paceman. Both had long Test careers and captained their country and are regarded as all-time Australian greats in the fields that O'Reilly chose for them—both were chosen with O'Reilly in the ACB Team of the Century. The pair credited O'Reilly as being the main influence in their careers, and Lindwall made his Test debut in O'Reilly's last Test in 1946.

In 1956–57, McCabe and O'Reilly were given a testimonial match by the New South Wales Cricket Association. The match was between Harvey's XI and Lindwall's XI and acted as a trial for the non-Test tour of New Zealand. It raised 7,500 pounds, which was split between McCabe and O'Reilly and would have bought two average-sized homes in Sydney at the time.

On retirement as a player, O'Reilly became a cricket columnist for the Sydney Morning Herald, remaining in that position until his health declined in 1988. His first engagement was England's tour of Australia in 1946–47, and during this season he began a partnership with the Daily Express of London, going on to cover several Ashes series for them. O'Reilly's articles for the Sydney Morning Herald were reproduced in its sister publication, The Age of Melbourne. Later, his writing was syndicated to newspapers in India, South Africa and New Zealand. His style was described by Wisden as "muscular, very Australian... flavoured with wit and imagery ('You can smell the gum-leaves off him', he wrote of one country boy just starting with Queensland)." Jack McHarg said that "The clarity, wit and pungency of his writing, together with almost infallible judgment, never deserted him", even as his health began to restrict him. He was a highly respected and forthright pundit, who hated one-day cricket, describing it as "hit and giggle". He condemned the omission of Keith Miller in 1949–50 and said that to call it "a complete surprise would be a cowardly way of describing a botch". Reacting to the selection of the dour batting all rounder Ken Mackay, he wrote "words fail...to express adequately my contempt for this howler". In 1952 he had a falling-out with Lindwall after condemning his protégé for bowling five consecutive bouncers at Everton Weekes in a Test. In comparison with his illustrious contemporary on-field and on paper, "while Sir Donald walked the corridors of cricketing power O'Reilly was the rumbustious backbencher." In 1956, O'Reilly strongly criticised Australian captain Ian Johnson, a Melburnian, for his leadership during the 1956 Ashes tour. The Age took exception to this and asked their sister publication to rein in their pundit. O'Reilly refused to shy away from his opinions and was dropped by the Melbourne publication. In the 1980s, when Bob Simpson became the first coach of Australia, O'Reilly, himself self-taught, spoke out against the creation of such posts. He was a strong critic of the breakaway World Series Cricket, the commercialization of the sport and the erosion of the social norms that were followed during his playing career.

Aside from his autobiography, O'Reilly wrote two books; Cricket Conquest: The Story of the 1948 Test Tour, published in 1949, and Cricket Task Force, published in 1951. They were accounts of the Invincibles tour of England in 1948 and England's Ashes tour to Australia in 1950–51.

Upon retiring from the Sydney Morning Herald, O'Reilly wrote in a column

As a writer on the game it has always been my one consuming resolve to tell my readers…exactly what my personal reactions were to the events of the day. Not once did I ever spend time racking my brain on what was the nice thing to say or the thoughts I should not let come through on paper. In my opinion that would have been cheating.

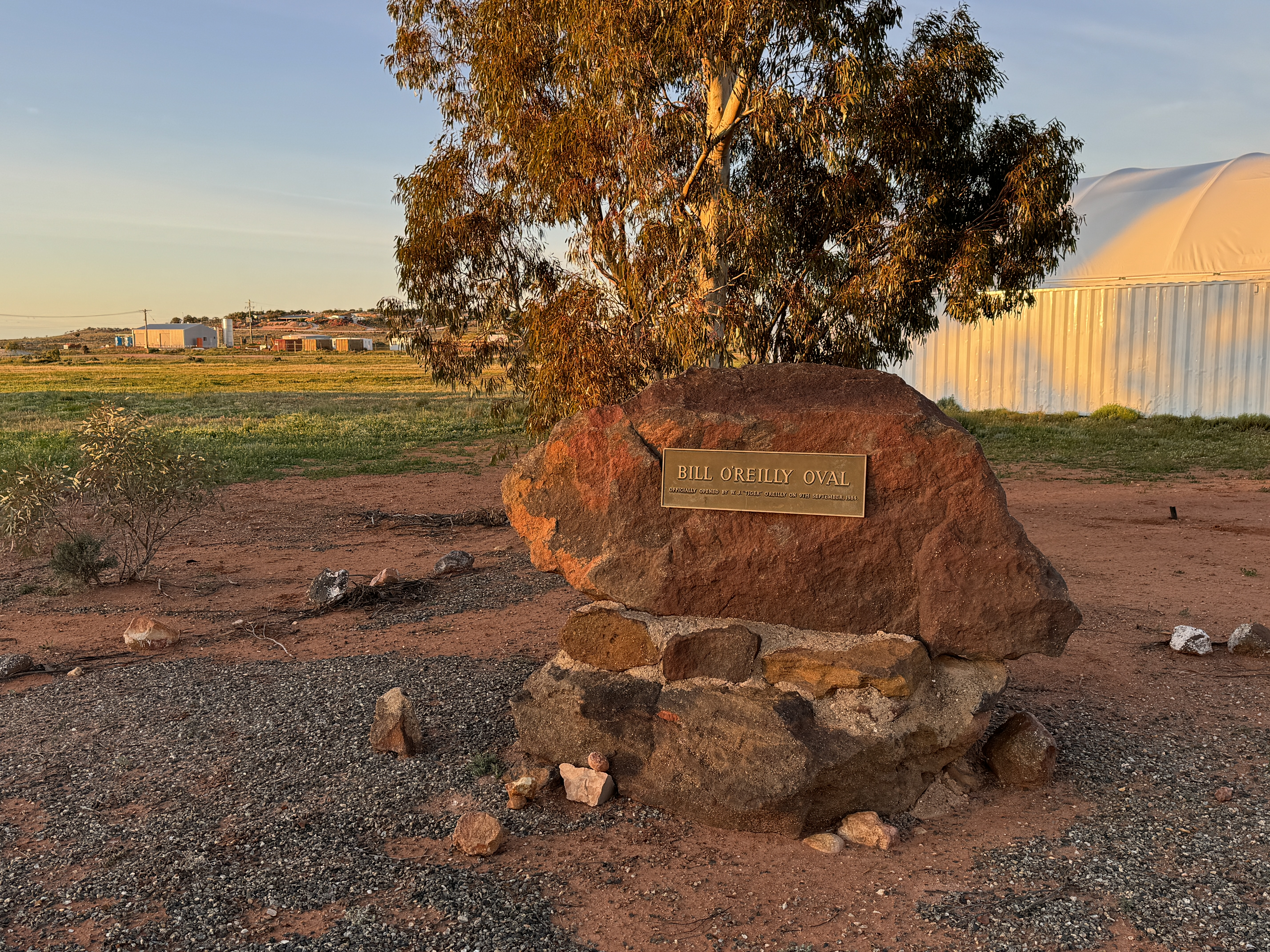
The Bill O'Reilly Oval at White Cliffs

O'Reilly was honored with several accolades late in his life. In 1980, he was awarded an Order of the British Empire for his services to cricket as a player and writer. In 1985, the oval in Wingello was renamed in his honor, and in 1988, a grandstand at the SCG was named the Bill O'Reilly Stand. In the same year, the oval in White Cliffs was renamed, and the Sydney Morning Herald renamed the medal they awarded to the best player in grade cricket in O'Reilly's honour. During the celebrations for the Australian Bicentenary, O'Reilly was named among the 200 people, and only 21 living, who had contributed the most to the country since European settlement.

O'Reilly's later years were troubled with poor health, including the loss of a leg. In late 1988, he suffered a major heart attack and was hospitalized for two months. He died in hospital in Sutherland in 1992, 75 days short of his 87th birthday. O'Reilly lamented the decline of spin during his twilight years, and in the 1980s he was often derided by younger people who felt that his advocacy of spin bowling—which they deemed to be obsolete—was misplaced. He died just months before Shane Warne revived the art of leg spin on the international stage.

In 1996, O'Reilly was posthumously inducted into the Australian Cricket Hall of Fame as one of the ten inaugural members. In 2000, O'Reilly was named in the Australian Cricket Board Team of the Century, and in 2009 he was named among the 55 inaugural inductees of the International Cricket Council's Hall of Fame, being formally inducted in January 2010.

== Statistical summary ==
In his 18-season first-class career, O'Reilly took 774 wickets at an average of 16.60. In his 27 Test matches, O'Reilly took 144 wickets at 22.59, 102 of them in his 19 Ashes Tests against England.

=== Test match performance ===
		Batting				Bowling			
Opposition	Matches	Runs	Average	High Score	100 / 50	Runs	Wickets	Average	Best (Innings)
England	19	277	10.65	42	0/0	2,587	102	25.36	7/54
New Zealand	1	–	–	–	–	33	8	4.12	5/14
South Africa	7	133	22.16	56*	0/1	634	34	18.64	5/20
Overall	27	410	12.81	56*	0/1	3,254	144	22.59	7/54

=== Career rankings and ratings ===
It has been retrospectively calculated by the International Cricket Council's LG Ratings that he was the best bowler in the world for much of his career.

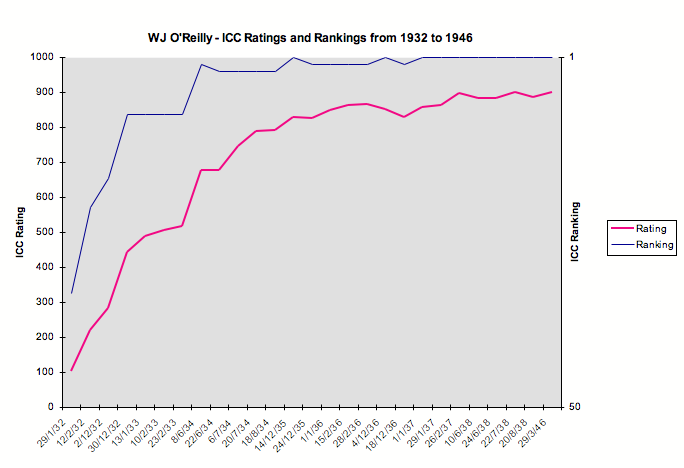
O'Reilly's ICC rankings and ratings from 1932 to 1946

== Song tribute ==
Folk musician Ted Egan released the song "The Tiger and the Don" about O'Reilly and Don Bradman; it was a track from the 2003 album The Land Downunder.
