= List of South Africa Test wicket-keepers =

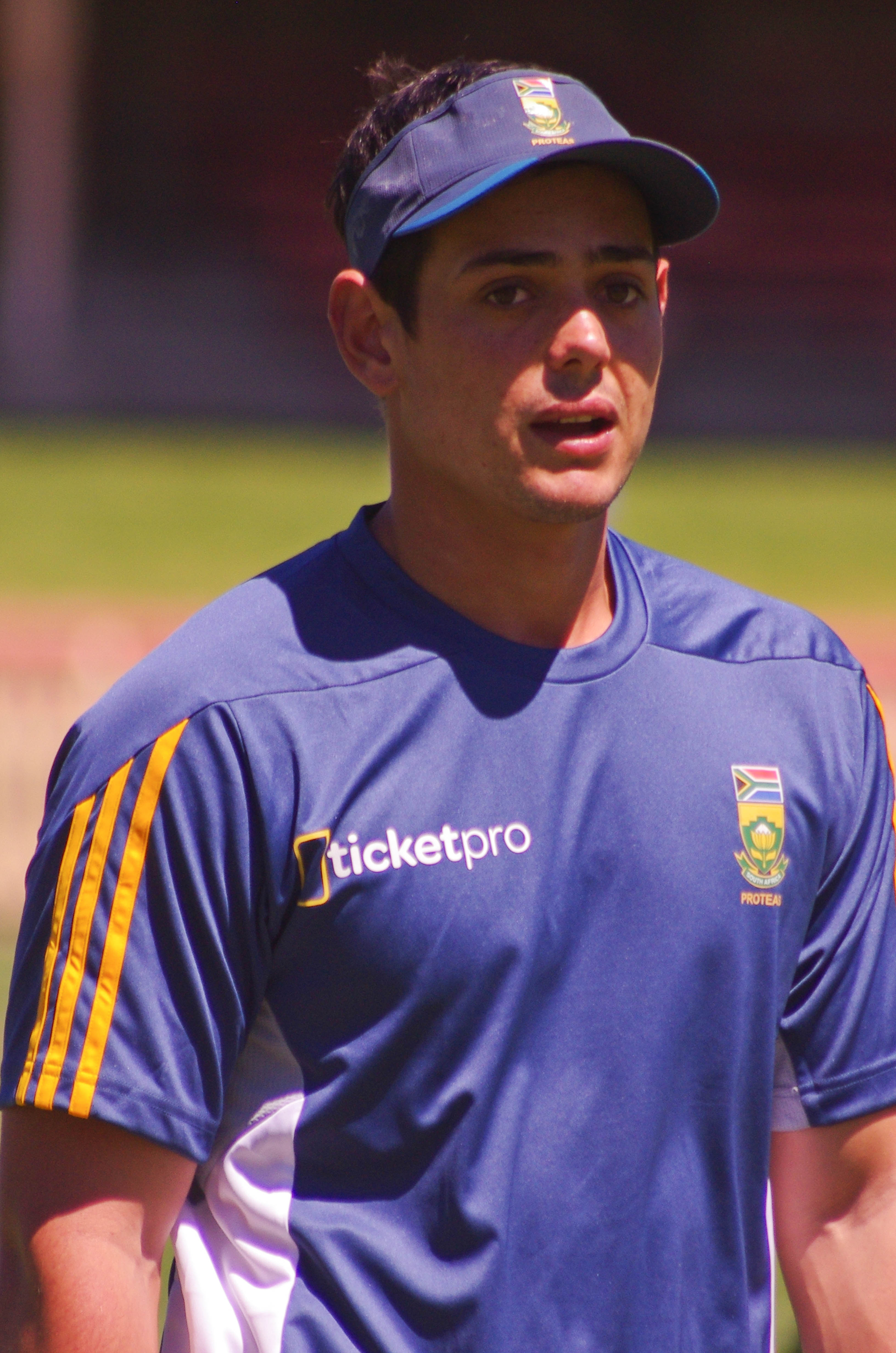
Quinton de Kock, current South Africa Test wicket-keeper

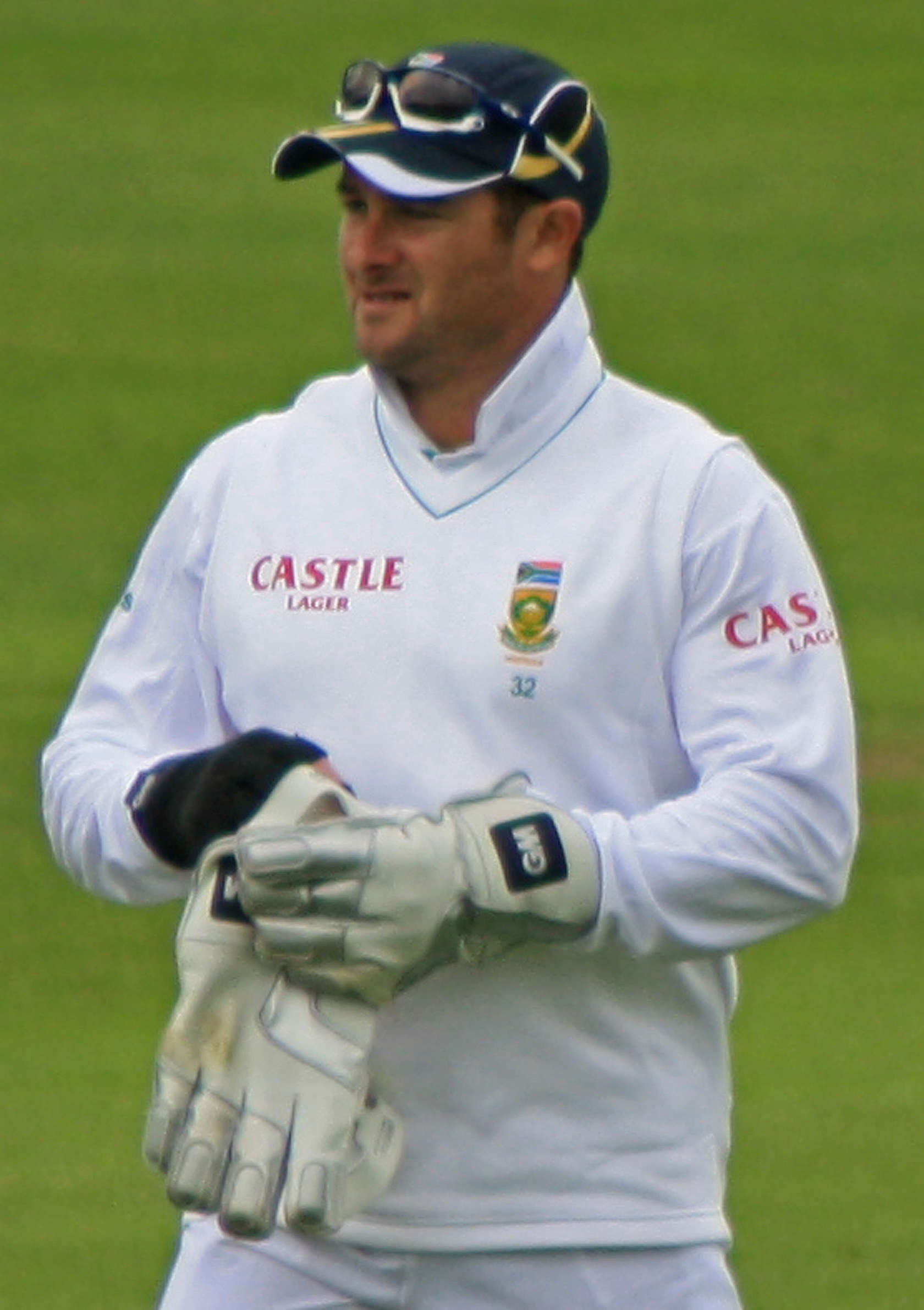
Mark Boucher, holds the record for most dismissals by a wicket-keeper in Test cricket and is South Africa's most capped wicket-keeper

This is a chronological list of South Africa Test wicket-keepers.

No.	Player	Span	Tests	Catches	Stumpings	Total
1	Fred Smith	1889	2	2	0	2
2	Ernest Halliwell	1892–1902	8	10	2	12
3	Murray Bisset	1899–1910	2	2	1	3
4	Percy Sherwell	1906–1911	13	20	16	36
5	Tom Campbell	1910–1912	5	7	1	8
6	Tommy Ward	1912–1924	23	19	13	32
7	Jock Cameron	1927–1935	26	39	12	51
8	Edward van der Merwe	1929–1936	2	3	0	3
9	Frank Nicholson	1935–1936	4	3	0	3
10	Billy Wade	1938–1950	11	15	2	17
11	Ronnie Grieveson	1939	2	7	3	10
12	Johnny Lindsay	1947	3	4	1	5
13	George Fullerton	1947–1950	4	6	2	8
14	John Waite	1951–1965	49	124	17	141
15	Russell Endean	1951	1	3	0	3
16	Denis Lindsay	1964–1970	15	54	2	56
17	Dennis Gamsy	1970	2	5	0	5
18	Dave Richardson	1992–1998	42	150	2	152
19	Mark Boucher	1997–2012	147	532	23	555
20	Thami Tsolekile	2004	3	6	0	6
21	AB de Villiers	2004–2015	24	89	5	94
22	Quinton de Kock	2014–2021	51	208	11	219
23	Dane Vilas	2015–16	6	13	0	13
24	Heinrich Klaasen	2019	1	3	1	4
24	Kyle Verreynne	2021	16	48	3	51
