= Siedle =

Siedle is a surname. Notable people with the surname include:

- Caroline Siedle (1867–1907), American costume designer
- Edward Siedle (1858–1925), American operatic technical director
- Jack Siedle (1903–1982), South African cricketer
- John Siedle (1932–2008), South African cricketer
- Otto Siedle (1856-1948), British-German businessman
