= Dooley Briscoe =

South African cricketer (1911–1941)

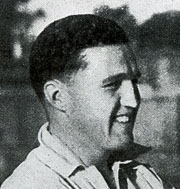

Personal information
- Born: 6 February 1911; Johannesburg, Transvaal
- Died: 22 April 1941 (aged 30) near Dessie, Ethiopia
- Batting: Right-handed

International information
- National side: South Africa

Career statistics
Competition	Tests	First-class
Matches	2	35
Runs scored	33	2,189
Batting average	11.00	45.60
100s/50s	0/0	6/10
Top score	16	191
Balls bowled	0	18
Wickets	–	0
Bowling average	–	–
5 wickets in innings	–	–
10 wickets in match	–	–
Best bowling	–	–
Catches/stumpings	1/–	15/–
- Source: Cricinfo

Captain Arthur Wellesley "Dooley" Briscoe MC (6 February 1911 – 22 April 1941) was a South African cricketer who played in two Test matches, one in 1935–36 and the other in 1938–39.

Briscoe was born at Johannesburg, Transvaal, and was educated at King Edward VII School. A batsman, he played domestic first-class cricket for Transvaal from 1931–32 to 1939–40, scoring six centuries. He was the leading run-scorer in the 1934–35 South African season, when Transvaal won the Currie Cup, with 592 runs at an average of 84.57, and his highest first-class score of 191 for Transvaal in the victory over Griqualand West.

Briscoe played in two Test matches, making his début in the second Test against the touring Australians at his home ground, Old Wanderers in Johannesburg, in December 1935. Despite having achieved some success in domestic cricket, he scored only 15 and 16, and he was dropped for the remainder of the five-match series. He played his second Test against the touring English team in the drawn second Test at Newlands, Cape Town in December 1938/January 1939. He was out for two, and was dropped again.

He played his last first-class match in January 1940. He joined the 1st Battalion of the Transvaal Scottish Regiment, and served in East Africa alongside fellow cricketers Bruce Mitchell and Ronnie Grieveson, fighting the Italians in Somaliland and Abyssinia. He was awarded the Military Cross for his actions in Huberta and Ionte (Yoontoy) in Italian Somaliland, and was killed in action near Dessie in Ethiopia.
