= Karl Siedle =

South African cricketer and South African Army officer

Personal information
- Full name: Karl Otto Siedle
- Born: 26 June 1889; Durban, Colony of Natal
- Died: 30 May 1918 (aged 28); Doullens, Somme, France
- Relatives: Jack Siedle (brother); John Siedle (nephew)

Domestic team information
- Years: Team
- 1913/14: Natal

Career statistics
Competition	First-class
Matches	1
Runs scored	0
Batting average	0.00
100s/50s	0/0
Top score	0
Balls bowled	54
Wickets	0
Bowling average
5 wickets in innings
10 wickets in match
Best bowling
Catches/stumpings	1/–
- Source: Cricinfo, 2 April 2021

Rugby union career
- Position: Forward
Amateur team(s)
Years	Team	Apps	(Points)
1909–1914	Old Collegians		
Provincial / State sides
Years	Team	Apps	(Points)
1909–1914	Natal		

Karl Otto Siedle MC (26 June 1889 – 30 May 1918) was a South African first-class cricketer, rugby union player and British Army officer.

The son of Otto Siedle, he was born at Durban in June 1889. He was educated at Weenen County College. He joined his father and brothers, Basil and Jack, in the family business in 1911. Siedle was a keen sportsman, playing both cricket and rugby union. He played first-class cricket for Natal, making a single appearance against the touring Marylebone Cricket Club (MCC) at Pietermaritzburg in December 1913. Batting once in the match, he was dismissed without scoring by Frank Woolley in Natal's first innings. He also bowled nine wicketless overs in the MCC's only innings.

Siedle played club rugby for Old Collegians and provincial rugby for Natal, making his debut in 1909. He was a member of the Natal team that participated in the 1911 and 1914 Currie Cup competitions.

Siedle served in the First World War in the British Army with the Royal Field Artillery. By 1917 he held the temporary lieutenant and was made a temporary captain in September of the same year. He was mentioned in dispatches by Douglas Haig in December 1917, at which point he was an acting major. He further appointed in that acting capacity in January 1918. Siedle was killed in action while leading a withdrawal on 30 May 1918, for which he was posthumously awarded the Military Cross for "conspicuous gallantry and devotion to duty while in command of his battery during a withdrawal." His brother, Jack, played Test cricket, while his nephew John Siedle played at first-class level; His sister Perla Siedle Gibson became a well-known singer and a symbol of South Africa during the Second World War. In his will, Siedle left enough money to the Natal Cricket Union to allow them to construct the Karl Siedle Memorial Clock and Tower at Kingsmead, where it remains to this day.
