= International cricket in 1935 =

International cricket season

The 1935 International cricket season was from April 1935 to August 1935.

== Season overview ==
International tours
Start date	Home team	Away team	Results [Matches]			
Start date	Home team	Away team	Test	ODI	FC	LA
26 June 1937	England	South Africa	0–1 [5]	—	—	—
29 July 1937	Netherlands	England	—	—	0–0 [3]	—

== June ==
=== South Africa in England ===
Test series
No.	Date	Home captain	Away captain	Venue	Result
Test 242	15–18 June	Bob Wyatt	Herby Wade	Trent Bridge, Nottingham	Match drawn
Test 243	29 Jun–2 June	Bob Wyatt	Herby Wade	Lord's, London	South Africa by 157 runs
Test 244	13–16 July	Bob Wyatt	Herby Wade	Headingley Cricket Ground, Leeds	Match drawn
Test 245	27–30 July	Bob Wyatt	Herby Wade	Old Trafford Cricket Ground, Manchester	Match drawn
Test 246	17–20 August	Bob Wyatt	Herby Wade	Kennington Oval, London	Match drawn

== July ==
=== England in Netherlands ===
Two-day Match Series
No.	Date	Home captain	Away captain	Venue	Result
Match 1	29–30 July	Not mentioned	KB Stanley	Haarlem	Match drawn
Match 2	31 Jul–1 August	G Hamburger	KB Stanley	Laren	Match drawn
Match 3	3–4 August	Not mentioned	KB Stanley	De Diepput, The Hague	Match drawn
