= Robert Harvey (cricketer) =

South African cricketer (1911–2000)

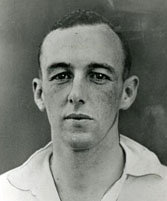

Personal information
- Full name: Robert Lyon Harvey
- Born: 14 September 1911; Swinburne, Orange Free State, South Africa
- Died: 20 July 2000 (aged 88); Kloof, KwaZulu-Natal, South Africa
- Batting: Right-handed
- Bowling: Right-arm medium

International information
- National side: South Africa
- Test debut: 15 February 1936 v Australia
- Last Test: 28 February 1936 v Australia

Domestic team information
- Years: Team
- 1933/34–1939/40: Natal

Career statistics
Competition	Test	First-class
Matches	2	25
Runs scored	51	1,298
Batting average	12.75	38.17
100s/50s	0/0	2/11
Top score	28	138
Balls bowled	–	2,222
Wickets	–	37
Bowling average	–	26.10
5 wickets in innings	–	2
10 wickets in match	–	0
Best bowling	–	5/21
Catches/stumpings	0/–	18/–
- Source: Cricinfo

Robert Lyon Harvey MBE (14 September 1911 – 20 July 2000) was a South African cricketer who played in two Test matches in 1935–36.

Harvey was a right-handed middle-order batsman and a right-arm medium-pace bowler. He played first-class cricket for Natal in two matches in 1933–34 without success.

But when he was picked again two years later for Natal in the match against the 1935–36 Australians, he scored 16 and 104. Although eventually bowled by Clarrie Grimmett, he resisted for three and three-quarters hours, and "alternated periods of hard hitting with rigid defence". After Grimmett (and Bill O'Reilly) had led Australia to two Test victories in the first three matches of a five-game series, with no South African batsman apart from Dudley Nourse making more than 66 runs in any one innings, Harvey was picked for the fourth Test. He had limited success, scoring 5 and 17 as the South Africans suffered their worst defeat of the series, though he did hit one six off Grimmett. The only first-class match between the fourth and fifth Tests was the second game between Natal and the Australians, and this time Harvey scored 138, slightly more than half the Natal first-innings total of 272; he shared a second-wicket stand of 135 with Herby Wade who was captain of both the Natal and the South African teams. Harvey was retained for the fifth Test and made scores of 28 and 1 in another heavy defeat being, in the second innings, the first out of five dismissals (of the last six batsmen in the team) to be caught by Vic Richardson off the bowling of Grimmett. On the whole tour of South Africa by the Australians, only four centuries were scored off them: two by Nourse (one in a Test) and two by Harvey.

Those centuries, though, were the only ones in Harvey's first-class cricket career. He remained as a batsman and, increasingly, a bowler with Natal up to the 1939–40 season but although he passed 50 on 11 further occasions, he did not reach 100 again. He took his best bowling figures in 1939–40, 5 for 21 in Natal's victory over Border.

At the end of the Second World War, as a temporary captain in the South African forces, he was awarded an MBE.
