= Eric Davies =

South African cricketer

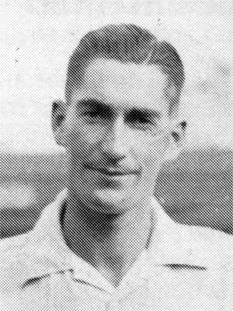

Personal information
- Full name: Eric Quail Davies
- Born: 26 August 1909; King William's Town, Cape Colony
- Died: 11 November 1976 (aged 67); Port Alfred, Cape Province, South Africa
- Batting: Left-handed
- Bowling: Right-arm fast
- Role: Bowler

International information
- National side: South Africa
- Test debut (cap 148): 15 February 1936 v Australia
- Last Test: 20 January 1939 v England

Career statistics
| Competition | Test | FC |
|---|---|---|
| Matches | 5 | 16 |
| Runs scored | 9 | 64 |
| Batting average | 1.80 | 3.55 |
| 100s/50s | 0/0 | 0/0 |
| Top score | 3 | 17 |
| Balls bowled | 768 | 2473 |
| Wickets | 7 | 47 |
| Bowling average | 68.71 | 27.70 |
| 5 wickets in innings | 0 | 2 |
| 10 wickets in match | 0 | 0 |
| Best bowling | 4/75 | 6/80 |
| Catches/stumpings | 0/– | 5/– |
- Source: Cricinfo, 10 July 2020

Eric Quail Davies (26 August 1909 – 11 November 1976), was a South African cricketer, who played in five Test matches from 1936 to 1939. He was born in King William's Town and died in Port Alfred, both in Cape Province.

== Cricket career ==
Davies was a right-arm fast bowler and left-handed tail-end batsman with a 16-match first-class cricket career extending from 1929 to 1946. At first, he played for Eastern Province in three matches in the 1929–30 season and took four wickets for 36 against Rhodesia in the third of these. He then played just one match in 1930–31 and a single game in 1934–35, with little success in either.

In 1935–36, the Australians toured South Africa and midway through their tour played a first-class match against Eastern Province. The Australians won the game easily by an innings inside two days, but Davies scored a personal success by taking six Australian wickets for 80 runs. That led to his selection for the fourth Test of the five-match series; the game was a crushing defeat inside two days for the South Africans, but Davies performed well, taking four for 75 in the touring team's only innings. Davies retained his place for the fifth Test where the result was a similarly heavy defeat, though South Africa batted better and the match lasted to the fourth day; Davies, however, was not successful and failed to take a wicket.

Davies played in only one match in 1936–37 and none at all the following season. But in 1938–39 he had a similar experience to 1935–36, turning out in a first-class match for a provincial side against the touring team, doing well and then being selected in the Test team. This time, he played for Transvaal against the Marylebone Cricket Club (MCC) team, and took six for 82 in the tourists' only innings. He also "felled" the England opening batsman Len Hutton with the third ball of the innings. His subsequent selection in the Test team for the first game of a five-match series may have looked inspired when he took the wicket of Bill Edrich in the first over of the first Test, but it proved to be his only wicket of the game. He also took only one wicket in the second Test, that of Wally Hammond, but Hammond had made 181 by that time and England's total reached 559 before they declared, though the match ended as a draw. And there was a third single wicket for Davies in the third match, and this time his 15 eight-ball overs went for 106 runs. He was dropped from the Test team after this match and did not play international cricket again.

Davies played very little further first-class cricket: in the ad hoc cricket of the 1945–46 season in South Africa, with no official tournaments organised for the first season after the Second World War, he turned out three times for North-Eastern Transvaal and those were his final first-class games. Outside cricket, he was a schoolmaster.
