= Australian cricket team in South Africa in 1935–36 =

International cricket tour

The Australia national cricket team toured South Africa from November 1935 to March 1936 and played a five-match Test series against South Africa. Australia won the Test series 4–0. Australia were captained by Vic Richardson; South Africa by Herby Wade.

== The team ==
- Vic Richardson (captain)
- Stan McCabe (vice-captain)
- Ben Barnett
- Bill Brown
- Arthur Chipperfield
- Len Darling
- Jack Fingleton
- Chuck Fleetwood-Smith
- Clarrie Grimmett
- Ernie McCormick
- Leo O'Brien
- Bert Oldfield
- Bill O'Reilly
- Morris Sievers

Don Bradman and Alan Kippax were unavailable. Hans Ebeling was selected but later withdrew and was replaced by Sievers. Harold Rowe was the manager.

== The tour ==
The Australians played 16 matches, all of them first-class. They won 13 (10 of them by an innings) and drew the other three. Of their four victories in the Tests, three were by an innings.

The leg-spin bowlers Grimmett (44 wickets) and O'Reilly (27) took 71 wickets between them in the Tests; the other Australian bowlers together took 27 wickets. On the tour overall O'Reilly took 95 wickets at an average of 13.56 and Grimmett took 92 at 14.80.

== Test series summary ==
=== First Test ===
14, 16, 17, 18 December 1935
(4-day match)
Scorecard

South Africa	v	Australia
248 (114.2 overs); EAB Rowan 66; LO Fleetwood-Smith 4/64 (28 overs)		429 (162.2 overs); SJ McCabe 149; ACB Langton 4/113 (48.2 overs)
282 (115 overs); AD Nourse 91; WJ O'Reilly 5/49 (17 overs)		102/1 (36.3 overs); WA Brown 55; EL Dalton 1/12 (1.3 overs)

Australia won by 9 wickets
Kingsmead Cricket Ground, Durban
Umpires: JC Collings and WG Routledge

- South Africa won the toss and elected to bat.
- 15 December was taken as a rest day.
- F Nicholson and JB Robertson (both SA), and EL McCormick and LO Fleetwood-Smith (both AUS) made their Test debuts.

=== Second Test ===
24, 26, 27, 28 December 1935
(4-day match)
Scorecard

South Africa	v	Australia
157 (63.2 overs); EAB Rowan 38; WJ O'Reilly 4/54 (20.2 overs)		250 (81.3 overs); JHW Fingleton 62; B Mitchell 4/26 (7.3 overs)
491 (149.3 overs); AD Nourse 231; CV Grimmett 3/111 (58 overs)		274/2 (76.1 overs); SJ McCabe 189*; RJ Crisp 1/62 (17.1 overs)

Match drawn
Old Wanderers, Johannesburg
Umpires: RGA Ashman and JC Collings

- South Africa won the toss and elected to bat.
- 25 December was taken as a rest day.
- AW Briscoe and EG Bock (both SA) made their Test debuts.

=== Third Test ===
1, 2, 3, 4 January 1936
(4-day match)
Scorecard

Australia	v	South Africa
362/8d (115 overs); WA Brown 121; XC Balaskas 4/126 (38 overs)		102 (38.2 overs); AD Nourse 44*; CV Grimmett 5/32 (17 overs)
		182 (f/o) (87.4 overs); IJ Siedle 59; CV Grimmett 5/56 (36.4 overs)

Australia won by an innings and 78 runs
Newlands Cricket Ground, Cape Town
Umpires: RGA Ashman and JC Collings

- Australia won the toss and elected to bat.
- There was no play on the first day.

=== Fourth Test ===
15, 17 February 1936
(4-day match)
Scorecard

South Africa	v	Australia
157 (63.4 overs); IJ Siedle 44; WJ O'Reilly 5/20 (21 overs)		439 (127.4 overs); JHW Fingleton 108; EQ Davies 4/75 (24.4 overs)
98 (43.5 overs); B Mitchell 48*; CV Grimmett 7/40 (19.5 overs)

Australia won by an innings and 184 runs
Old Wanderers, Johannesburg
Umpires: RGA Ashman and JC Collings

- South Africa won the toss and elected to bat.
- 16 February was taken as a rest day.
- The match was scheduled for four days but completed in two.
- RL Harvey and EQ Davies (both SA) made their Test debuts.

=== Fifth Test ===
28, 29 February, 2, 3 March 1936
(4-day match)
Scorecard

South Africa	v	Australia
222 (109.1 overs); KG Viljoen 56; CV Grimmett 7/100 (45 overs)		455 (146.5 overs); JHW Fingleton 118; B Mitchell 5/87 (25.5 overs)
227 (113.1 overs); B Mitchell 72*; CV Grimmett 6/73 (48 overs)

Australia won by an innings and 6 runs
Kingsmead Cricket Ground, Durban
Umpires: JC Collings and WG Routledge

- South Africa won the toss and elected to bat.
- 1 March was taken as a rest day.
