= Samuel Rowe =

Samuel Rowe may refer to:

- Samuel Rowe (antiquary) (1793–1853), English vicar and antiquary
- Samuel Rowe (colonial administrator) (1835–1888), English governor of Sierra Leone
- Samuel Evans Rowe (1834–1897), Methodist minister and missionary in South Africa
- Samuel Harold Rowe (cricketer) (1883–1968), West Australian cricketer, footballer and administrator
