= Edward van der Merwe =

South African cricketer (1903–1971)

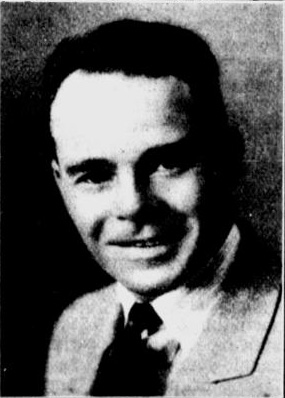

Personal information
- Born: 9 November 1903; Rustenburg, Transvaal
- Died: 26 February 1971 (aged 67); Auckland Park, Transvaal, South Africa
- Batting: Right-handed
- Role: Wicket-keeper

International information
- National side: South Africa
- Test debut: 13 July 1929 v England
- Last Test: 28 February 1936 v Australia

Career statistics
Competition	Test	First-class
Matches	2	27
Runs scored	27	287
Batting average	9.00	10.62
100s/50s	0/0	0/0
Top score	19	35*
Catches/stumpings	3/0	35/29
- Source: Cricinfo, 14 November 2022

Edward Alexander van der Merwe (9 November 1903 – 26 February 1971) was a South African cricketer who played in two Test matches, one each in 1929 and 1935–36.

Van der Merwe was born in Rustenburg, Transvaal, and studied at the University of the Witwatersrand, where he excelled at sport. He played Rugby union for Transvaal.

Van der Merwe was a lower-order right-handed batsman and wicketkeeper whose first-class cricket career extended over 11 years and included two important tours in the South African team, but which amounted to only 27 matches in all. He had played only three times for Transvaal when he was picked as the second wicketkeeper to Jock Cameron on the 1929 tour of England. With Cameron one of the key players of the team, his opportunities were limited and he played in only 14 of the 34 first-class matches on the tour, but they included the third Test match at Headingley, as Cameron had not recovered from being knocked unconscious while batting against Harold Larwood in the preceding Test at Lord's. Van der Merwe took two catches and, batting at No 10, scored 19 and 1. But Cameron, a far better batsman, resumed his place in the side for the next match in the series. The last game of the sequence of five consecutive tour matches played by van der Merwe while Cameron was injured was the first-class game against Scotland at Perth, and, still batting at No 10, he made an unbeaten 35, and this would prove to be the highest score of his career.

Van der Merwe returned to South Africa after the England tour, but his cricket over the next two seasons was only intermittent: one match for Transvaal in 1929–30 and two, both for Transvaal against the England touring team, in 1930–31. But in 1931–32 he was chosen again for an overseas tour as Cameron's deputy wicketkeeper: this time the tour to Australia and New Zealand. As in England in 1929, van der Merwe was not called on for many games: he played in only three first-class matches, none of them Tests, and returned to South Africa with Stephen Steyn before the team embarked on the New Zealand leg of the tour.

After this tour, van der Merwe disappeared from first-class cricket for four years. He was recalled in 1935–36, straight into the South African Test team for the fifth and final match in the Australian series. Cameron had died suddenly on his return from the 1935 tour of England and his deputy on that tour, Robert Williams, had remained in England. In the first four matches of the Australian series, wicketkeeping had been in the hands of Frank Nicholson; he had taken only three catches in the four games, and fielding lapses were cited as a reason the series was being lost. Van der Merwe was unable to stop the losses, and took only one catch in his single match, scoring 7 not out and 0 as Australia won by an innings.

This proved to be van der Merwe's final Test appearance; and he made only three more first-class appearances for Transvaal in the 1937–38 season before leaving cricket.

In February 1971, van der Merwe died by shooting himself.
