= Xenia Belmas =

Ukrainian opera singer

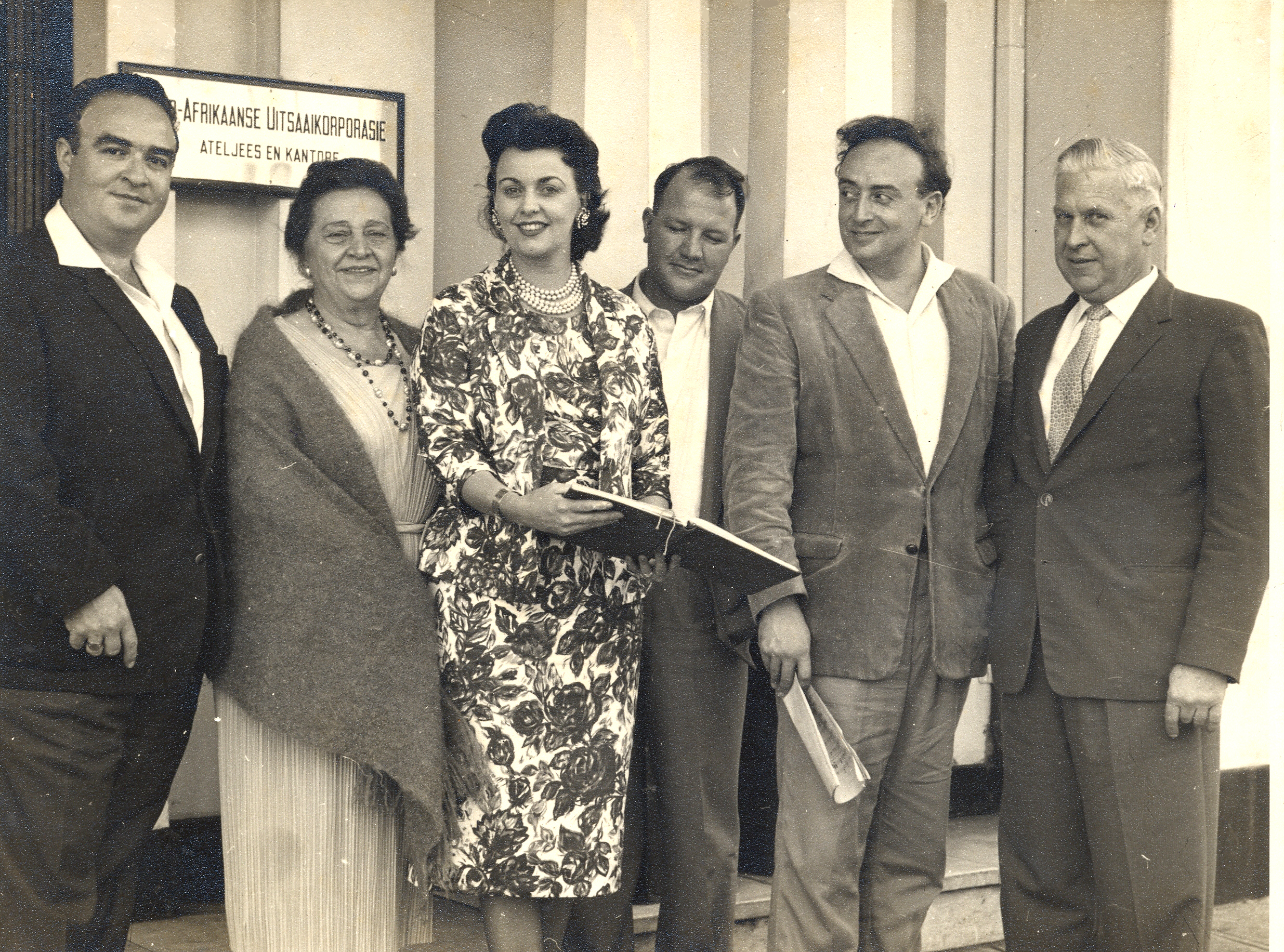
Photo taken during the recording of the Sextet from "Lucia di Lammermoor" on 10 October 1963: Alphonso Lee; Xenia Belmas; Rose Barnett; George van Wyngaard; Walter Heinen & Louis Kearney

Xenia Alexandrovna Belmas (Russian: Ксения Александровна Бельмас; c. 23 January 1890 (Note: According to Kutsch (2003) however, she was born in 1889.) – 2 February 1981) was a Ukrainian soprano, born in Chernihiv, Ukraine. She was married to Ukrainian conductor Alexander Kitschin. Once the doyenne of the Paris Opera Company, she was also a recording star with more than 80 records to her credit.

== Early life ==
Born of a Ukrainian mother and French-descent father, Belmas received her first lessons in singing from her mother and older sister. At the age of 16, she was auditioned by the composer, Alexander Glazunov. She then started her training at the Kyiv Conservatory, after which she made her debut at the Odesa Opera Theater, where she had her first success in the role of Tatyana in Tchaikovsky's Eugene Onegin. By 1921 she was the leading singer at the Odessa Opera Theater. At this time she married a wealthy landowner which enabled her to continue her training at the Bolshoi Theater in Moscow under the direction of maestro Emil Kuper.

== Fleeing from Russia (1921) ==
During World War I, her husband was seriously wounded and Belmas moved to St. Petersburg to nurse him. After losing her home as well as both her parents during the Russian Revolution and then also her husband during the Russian Civil War, she fled Ukraine in late 1921 and crossed the Polish border. In Poland, she married the pianist and conductor, Alexander Kitschin from Kyiv. They soon moved to Wiesbaden in Germany.

== Operatic career in France ==
Belmas then decided to go to Milan in Italy to further her studies in the Italian repertoire. Upon arrival in Italy, she said: "I had only two dresses and one pair of shoes with holes in them. But I was happy and had the opportunity to meet some very great people." After completing her studies in Italy, she went to Paris - "young, enthusiastic, but terribly shy". All she had with her was a suitcase with a change of clothes, and a letter from Alexander Glazunov directed to the influential owner of a chain of French newspapers (whose name is not recorded in any of the sources) and which would provide her with an entrée to Paris opera circles. After reading the letter of introduction, the newspaper magnate asked Belmas to sing for him and then later invited her to sing before an audience at his home. Among those present in the audience were Marshal Philippe Pétain as well as many of Paris's chief critics. The following day the critics praised her voice in their newspapers. Agents and impresarios besieged her with offers of parts.

In the course of three months, she performed 16 concerts, singing with the eight leading orchestras of France. One of those whose attention was attracted by her voice, was Jacques Rouché, the director of the Grand Opera House of Paris. Although Rouché complimented her on her voice, he offered her no engagements. At the Paris Exhibition of 1926, Belmas performed 17 concerts at the Grand Palais, one of them before President Gaston Doumergue to whom she was introduced. Jacques Rouché was also present at one of the concerts, after which he invited her to sing at the Grand Opera House. "He told me he had waited until he could invite me to sing as a guest artist. That is why those earlier engagements did not come from him." He asked her to sing in Faust, but she insisted on singing Aida, to which Rouché agreed. She subsequently made her debut in Aida on 18 January 1926 without any rehearsals: "Guest artists were expected to be able to know their parts well enough to play them without rehearsal."

In October 1926 Belmas and her husband returned to Milan where they were invited to perform before Arturo Toscanini at La Scala. In 1928 they moved from France to Berlin where she expanded her repertoire and was also invited to make 80 records consisting of opera arias and Russian songs.

== Operatic tour in Australia (1928) ==
In November 1927 it was announced in newspapers, magazines and many opera programs that Irene Minghini Cattaneo was planning to travel to Australia with a particularly stellar group of Italian and other artists including Belmas, for a six-month season of opera "the likes of which Australia had never seen". The company was to appear in Melbourne, Sydney, Adelaide and Perth. This tour, in collaboration with the La Scala Opera Company, Milan, took place in 1928, with Belmas performing as one of the principal singers of the Melba-Williamson Opera Company.

By the time the company reached Sydney, many cast changes had been announced. Australians who had been promised leading roles were not used, which led to some critics labelling it as an Italian conspiracy. Among others, Giannina Arangi-Lombardi replaced Belmas as Santuzza in Pietro Mascagni's Cavalleria Rusticana, which had been the Russian soprano's only role up to that time on the tour. Although Lombardi sang well, critics still maintained that there was no reason to have "engineered" the replacements. Belmas ended up giving recitals during the rest of the season before returning to Europe disappointed, despite the positive reports written about her in the newspapers.

This tour was described by Bob Rideout as one of the most famous events in the history of opera in Australia.

== Move to South Africa (1934) ==
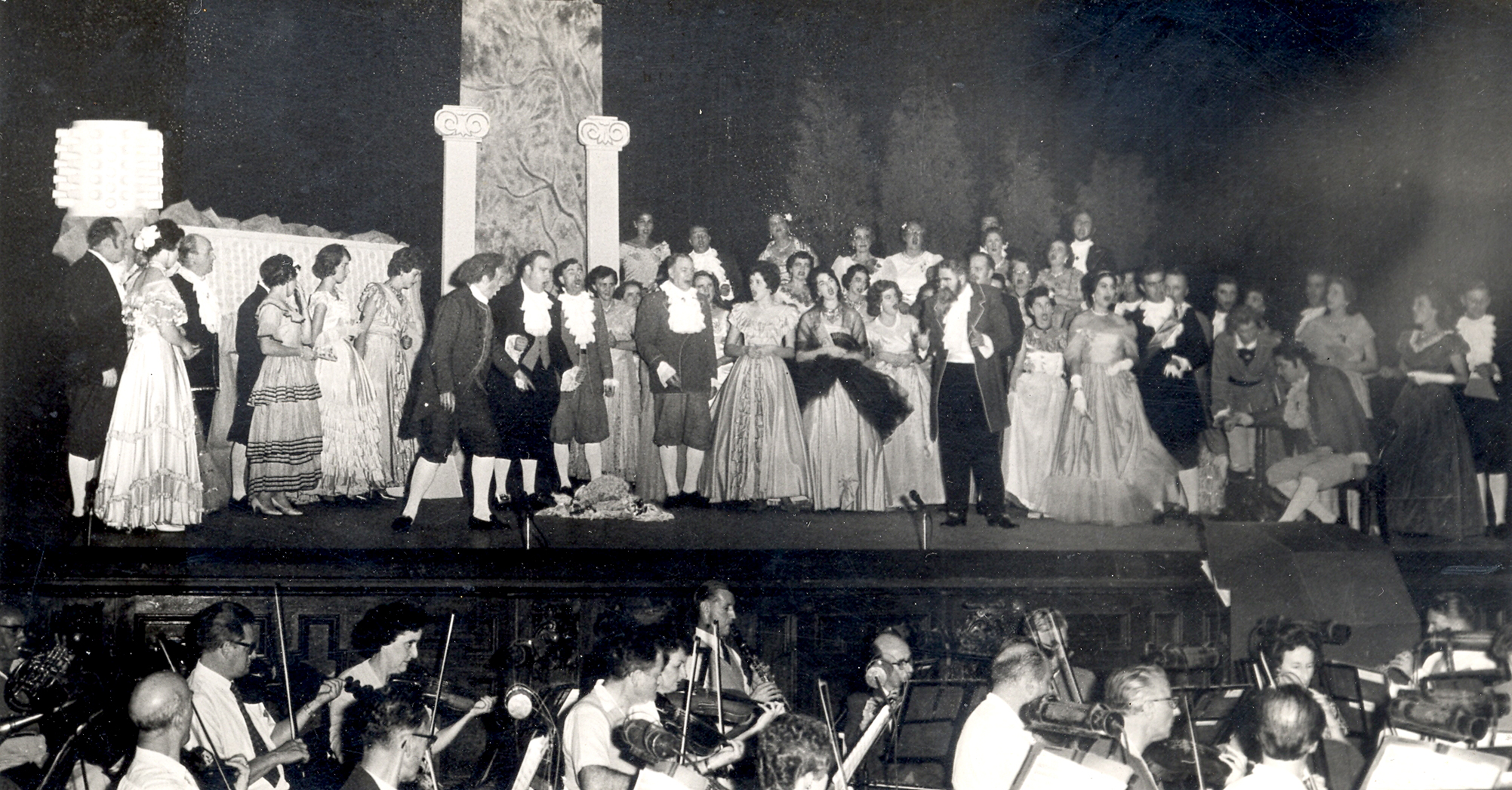
Photo taken during the production of The Tales of Hoffmann in Durban in 1964, consisting of many students of Xenia Belmas

Upon returning from Australia, Belmas continued her career which took her on tours of France, Germany, Poland, Monte Carlo (1931), the Baltic States (1932) and Scandinavia. In 1934 she came to South Africa on a tour of twenty concerts in South African cities. The couple arrived in Cape Town on 25 July 1934. While in South Africa, her second husband deserted her for another woman, after he had gambled away all of Belmas's savings. Belmas decided to remain in South Africa living in relative obscurity in a house at 474 Bartle Road in Umbilo, Durban where she taught singing. Students included Perla Siedle ("The Lady in White"), Clare Ellis Brown, Harold Lake, Denise McWilliam, Josslyn Kahn, Dorothy Avrich, Rose Barnett, Venetia Dawber, Magrit Habermann, and George van Wyngaard. Belmas wanted to see grand opera performed in South Africa, and in 1964 Dr Heinrich Haape produced both Madam Butterfly and The Tales of Hoffmann in Durban with many of her students singing in these operas.

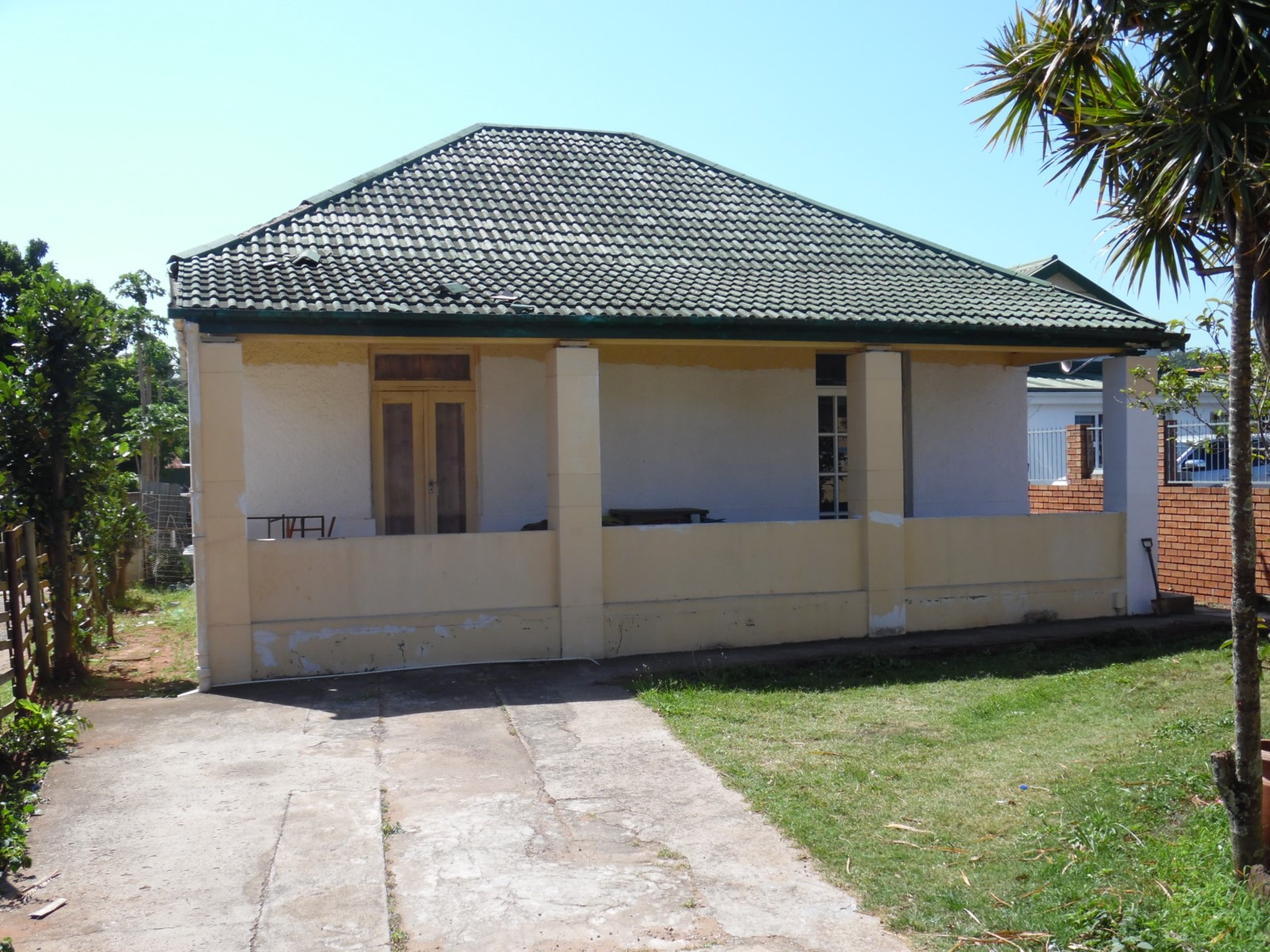
The house at 474 Bartle Road in Umbilo, Durban, where Xenia Belmas lived and taught her students.

Her disappearance at the peak of her career in Europe led to much speculation among biographers, many of whom ended their notes on her life and career with "believed dead, nothing more is known of this singer".

In December 1964 Harry Farber, secretary of the Johannesburg Historical Record Society, revealed to Belmas's biographer, Leo Riemens, that she was in fact alive and living in Durban. This helped Riemens to conclude his biography on her life.

Belmas celebrated her 80th birthday on 6 February 1971.

She died in Durban, South Africa, on 2 February 1981 of cancer. Her remains were transferred to Kyiv in 2000 where she was reburied in the cemetery of Bajkovo.

== Notable recordings ==
As a tribute to her, two long-playing albums of her best recordings were issued under the name: Lebendige Vergangenheit: Xenia Belmas and Lebendige Vergangenheit: Xenia Belmas II.

== Media ==
- "Chi me frena in tal momento" from Lucia di Lammermoor on YouTube Rose Barnett (Soprano); George van Wyngaard (Tenor); Alphonso Lee (Baritone); Xenia Belmas (Mezzo-Soprano); Walter Heinen (Bass) & Louis Kearney (2nd Tenor). Accompanist: Violet Fayle. The recording was made at the South African Broadcasting Company in Durban (South Africa) on 10 October 1961.
- "Lisa's aria" from Pique Dame. on YouTube The orchestra was conducted by her husband, Alexander Kitchin.
- Eastern Song: The nightingale enslaved by the rose by Rimsky-Korsakov on YouTube
- "Quando m'en vo soletta" from La Bohème on YouTube
- Top Tracks playlist on YouTube
