= Frank Nicholson (cricketer) =

South African cricketer

Personal information
- Born: 17 September 1909; Millom, Cumberland, England
- Died: 30 July 1982 (aged 72); Port Elizabeth, Cape Province, South Africa
- Batting: Right-handed
- Role: Wicketkeeper-batsman

International information
- National side: South Africa
- Test debut: 14 December 1935 v Australia
- Last Test: 15 February 1936 v Australia

Domestic team information
- Years: Team
- 1927/28–1946/47: Griqualand West

Career statistics
| Competition | Test | FC |
|---|---|---|
| Matches | 4 | 52 |
| Runs scored | 76 | 2,353 |
| Batting average | 10.85 | 24.76 |
| 100s/50s | 0/0 | 4/14 |
| Top score | 29 | 185 |
| Catches/stumpings | 3/– | 32/37 |
- Source: Cricinfo, 19 November 2022

Frank "Nipper" Nicholson (17 September 1909 – 30 July 1982) was a South African cricketer who played in four Test matches in 1935–36.

Nicholson was a right-hand batsman and wicket-keeper who was a mainstay of the often-weak Griqualand West cricket team for 20 years from 1927, sometimes acting as captain and often opening the batting. It was as an opener that he scored his first century, an innings of 131 against Western Province in the 1929–30 season; with a double century from Ken Viljoen and 101 from Xen Balaskas, Griqualand West totalled 603, which remains the team's highest first-class total. He improved on that innings with a score of 148 in 1933–34 against Orange Free State. A year later against the same opposition, as opening batsman, wicketkeeper and captain, he scored 185, which remained his highest first-class score. He was not, however, selected for any representative sides and was not picked for the 1935 tour of England.

In the South African season of 1935–36, Nicholson was drafted into the South African Test team for the series against Australia after the shock death of Jock Cameron, who had been such a success on the tour to England and the decision by Robert Williams, Cameron's deputy on the England tour, to remain in the UK. In a one-sided series which Australia won 4–0, with one match drawn, Nicholson took only three catches in the first four matches, and, after making 0 in both innings of the fourth Test, was dropped for the fifth match in favour of Edward van der Merwe. He batted low in the order and made just 76 runs in eight innings, one of them not out.

Nicholson returned to Griqualand West and played regularly for a further two seasons, and then irregularly through to 1946–47.
