= English cricket team in South Africa in 1938–39 =

International cricket tour

England in South Africa in 1938–39
	England	South Africa
- Dates: 8 November 1938 – 14 March 1939
Captains	Wally Hammond	Alan Melville

Test series
- Result: England won the 5-match series 1–0
Most runs	Eddie Paynter (653)	Bruce Mitchell (466)
Most wickets	Hedley Verity (19)	Norman Gordon (20)

The England cricket team toured South Africa from 8 November 1938 to 14 March 1939, playing five Test matches against the South Africa national team and (as the Marylebone Cricket Club) 13 tour matches against various provincial sides. England won the third Test by an innings and 13 runs, but the other four Tests finished as draws, including the final timeless Test, which was played over the course of 10 days (not including two rest days). The final Test was declared a draw, as the England team had to leave to ensure they caught the boat home from Cape Town.

== Test series ==
=== 1st Test ===
24–28 December 1938
Scorecard

England	v	South Africa
422 (113.4 overs); E Paynter 117; N Gordon 5/103 (33.4 overs)		390 (135.1 overs); EL Dalton 102; H Verity 4/61 (44.1 overs)
291/5d (61.5 overs); PA Gibb 106; EL Dalton 2/29 (6.5 overs)		108/1 (51 overs); B Mitchell 48*; WR Hammond 1/13 (6 overs)

Match drawn
Old Wanderers, Johannesburg
Umpires: RGA Ashman (SA) and GL Sickler (SA)

- England won the toss and elected to bat.
- PA Gibb, LL Wilkinson, NWD Yardley (all Eng), GE Bond, N Gordon, A Melville, PGV van der Bijl and WW Wade (all SA) made their Test debuts.
- 25 December was taken as a rest day.

The South African innings of 390 featured an unbalanced scorecard - there were five half-centuries, a single-figure score and five players failed to score.

=== 2nd Test ===
31 December 1938 – 4 January 1939
Scorecard

England	v	South Africa
559/9d (130.7 overs); WR Hammond 181; N Gordon 5/157 (40 overs)		286 (118.6 overs); AD Nourse 120; H Verity 5/70 (36.6 overs)
		201/2 (53 overs; f/o); EAB Rowan 89*; K Farnes 1/23 (8 overs)

Match drawn
Newlands, Cape Town
Umpires: RGA Ashman (SA) and GL Sickler (SA)

- England won the toss and elected to bat.
- 1 January was taken as a rest day.

=== 3rd Test ===
20–23 January 1939
Scorecard

England	v	South Africa
469/4d (88.5 overs); E Paynter 243; N Gordon 2/127 (29 overs)		103 (45.5 overs); B Mitchell 30; K Farnes 4/29 (13 overs)
		353 (114.2 overs); B Mitchell 109; H Verity 3/71 (35 overs)

England won by an innings and 13 runs
Kingsmead, Durban
Umpires: RGA Ashman (SA) and GL Sickler (SA)

- England won the toss and elected to bat.
- 22 January was taken as a rest day

=== 4th Test ===
18–22 February 1939
Scorecard

England	v	South Africa
215 (64.2 overs); L Hutton 92; ACB Langton 5/58 (19.2 overs)		349/8d (101.5 overs); EAB Rowan 85; H Verity 3/127 (37.5 overs)
203/4 (60 overs); WR Hammond 61*; N Gordon 3/58 (22 overs)

Match drawn
Old Wanderers, Johannesburg
Umpires: RGA Ashman (SA) and GL Sickler (SA)

- England won the toss and elected to bat.
- No play was possible on day 3.
- RE Grieveson (SA) made his Test debut.
- 19 February was taken as a rest day.

=== 5th Test ===
3–14 March 1939
(Timeless Test)
Scorecard

South Africa	v	England
530 (202.6 overs); PGV van der Bijl 125; RTD Perks 5/100 (41 overs)		316 (117.6 overs); LEG Ames 84; EL Dalton 4/59 (13 overs)
481 (142.1 overs); A Melville 103; K Farnes 4/74 (22.1 overs)		654/5 (218.2 overs); WJ Edrich 219; EL Dalton 2/100 (27 overs)

Match drawn (by agreement)
Kingsmead, Durban
Umpires: RGA Ashman (SA) and GL Sickler (SA)

- South Africa won the toss and elected to bat.
- No play was possible on day 8.
- RTD Perks (Eng) made his Test debut.
- 5 March and 12 March were taken as rest days.
- This was the longest test match in terms of duration.

== Tour matches ==
- 8–9 November (The Strand): Marylebone Cricket Club (589/8d) vs Western Province County District (140 & 107). MCC won by an innings and 342 runs.
- 12–15 November (Newlands, Cape Town): Western Province (174 & 169) vs Marylebone Cricket Club (276 & 69/2). MCC won by 8 wickets.
- 19–22 November (Athletic Club Ground, Kimberley): Marylebone Cricket Club (676) vs Griqualand West (114 & 273). MCC won by an innings and 289 runs.
- 26–28 November (Ramblers Cricket Club Ground, Bloemfontein): Orange Free State (128 & 260) vs Marylebone Cricket Club (412/6d). MCC won by an innings and 24 runs.
- 3–6 December (Kingsmead, Durban): Natal (307 & 30/0) vs Marylebone Cricket Club (458). Match drawn.
- 10–13 December (Berea Park, Pretoria): North Eastern Transvaal (161 & 142) vs Marylebone Cricket Club (379/6d). MCC won by an innings and 76 runs.
- 16–19 December (Old Wanderers, Johannesburg): Transvaal (428/8d & 174/2) vs Marylebone Cricket Club (268). Match drawn.
- 7–9 January (St George's Oval, Port Elizabeth): Eastern Province (172 & 111) vs Marylebone Cricket Club (518/6d). MCC won by an innings and 235 runs.
- 13–16 January (Jan Smuts Ground, East London): Border (121 & 275) vs Marylebone Cricket Club (320 & 79/1). MCC won by 9 wickets.
- 27–30 January (Old Wanderers, Johannesburg): Combined Transvaal/Northern Transvaal XI (304 & 220/2) vs Marylebone Cricket Club (434). Match drawn.
- 4–7 February (Queens Sports Club, Bulawayo): Marylebone Cricket Club (307/5d) vs Rhodesia (242). Match drawn.
- 10–13 February (Salisbury Sports Club, Salisbury): Marylebone Cricket Club (180 & 174/2d) vs Rhodesia (96 & 95/6). Match drawn.
- 25–28 February (City Oval, Pietermaritzburg): Natal (295 & 219) vs Marylebone Cricket Club (407 & 110/1). MCC won by 9 wickets.
