= Ernest Bock =

South African cricketer (1908–1961)

Personal information
- Full name: Ernest George Bock
- Born: 17 September 1908; Kimberley, Cape Colony
- Died: 5 September 1961 (aged 52); Springs, Transvaal, South Africa
- Batting: Right-handed
- Bowling: Right-arm medium

International information
- National side: South Africa
- Only Test: 24 December 1935 v Australia

Career statistics
Competition	Test	First-class
Matches	1	19
Runs scored	11	281
Batting average	–	14.05
100s/50s	0/0	0/1
Top score	9*	78
Balls bowled	138	1,855
Wickets	0	32
Bowling average	–	27.78
5 wickets in innings	–	1
10 wickets in match	–	0
Best bowling	–	5/8
Catches/stumpings	0/–	12/–
- Source: CricketArchive, 15 November 2022

Ernest George Bock (17 September 1908 – 5 September 1961) was a South African cricketer who played in one Test in 1935.

Bock was born in Kimberley, South Africa. He was a lower-order right-handed batsman and a right-arm medium pace bowler who played only two full seasons of first-class cricket in South Africa, one for Griqualand West and one for Transvaal. Only a couple of times did he achieve distinction. For Griqualand West against Rhodesia in 1931–32, batting at number 9, he scored 78. In 1934–35, in the final match of the season for Transvaal against Orange Free State he took five wickets for eight runs as the Free State side were bowled out for 70.

After that bowling performance, Bock only appeared in three further first-class games. The first of those was the second Test against Australia at Johannesburg in 1935–36, when he batted at number 11 in both innings, scoring 9 and 2, both times not out, and he failed to take a wicket in 23 overs. After that match he disappeared from first-class cricket for four years until two final matches for North Eastern Transvaal in 1939–40. He died at Springs, Transvaal, in 1961, aged 52.

== See also ==
- List of South African cricket and rugby union players
