= Gerald Bond =

South African cricketer (1909–1965)

Personal information
- Born: 5 April 1909; Cape Town, Cape Colony
- Died: 27 August 1965 (aged 56); Cape Town, Cape Province, South Africa
- Batting: Right-handed
- Bowling: Right-arm medium

International information
- National side: South Africa

Domestic team information
- Years: Team
- 1929/30–1938/39: Western Province

Career statistics
Competition	Tests	First-class
Matches	1	28
Runs scored	0	1604
Batting average	0	41.12
100s/50s	0/0	1/11
Top score	0	170
Balls bowled	16	1462
Wickets	0	20
Bowling average	–	35.35
5 wickets in innings	0	0
10 wickets in match	0	0
Best bowling	–	4/17
Catches/stumpings	0/–	11/–
- Source: CricketArchive

Gerald Edward Bond (5 April 1909 – 27 August 1965) was a South African cricketer who played in one Test in 1938. He was born and died at Cape Town.

== Career ==
Bond was a right-handed middle- or upper-order batsman and a right-arm medium-pace bowler. He played irregularly for Western Province from 1929–30. His best season was 1936–37 when he scored his only first-class century, a score of 170 for Western Province against Natal which was insufficient to prevent his side losing the match by an innings. In the following game, opening the Western Province bowling against Border, he took four wickets for 17 runs with his medium-pace, the best bowling performance of his career.

Bond's Test career was fleeting. He took two wickets (including Wally Hammond) in Western Province's match against the England team in 1938–39 and scored 13 in each innings. He was then picked for the first Test of a five-match series. When England batted, he was the sixth bowler used and was given only two overs, in which he failed to take a wicket and conceded 16 runs; in the South African innings, the unsuccessful promotion of a nightwatchman meant that he batted at no. 9 instead of no. 3 or no. 4 as he generally did for Western Province, and he was dismissed first ball, one of three first-ball dismissals in the innings. He was not selected for South Africa again and in fact did not play any further first-class cricket either.
