= Jack Siedle =

South Africa cricketer (1903–1982)

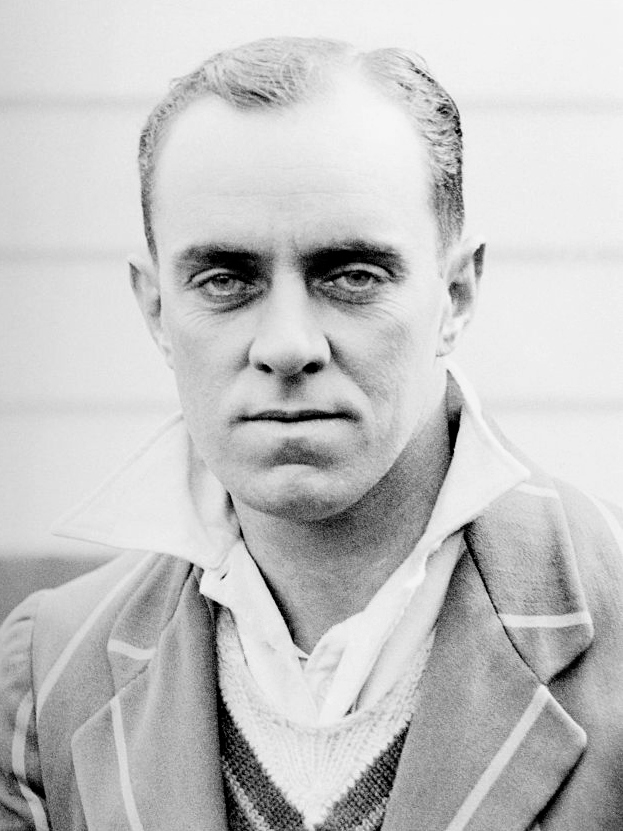
- Siedle in 1935

Personal information
- Full name: Ivan Julian Siedle
- Born: 11 January 1903; Berea, Durban, Colony of Natal
- Died: 24 August 1982 (aged 79); Bulwer, Natal, South Africa
- Batting: Right-handed
- Bowling: Right-arm

International information
- National side: South Africa
- Test debut: 21 January 1928 v England
- Last Test: 28 February 1936 v Australia

Career statistics
Competition	Test	First-class
Matches	18	123
Runs scored	977	7,730
Batting average	28.73	40.05
100s/50s	1/5	17/32
Top score	141	265*
Balls bowled	19	49
Wickets	1	1
Bowling average	7.00	35.00
5 wickets in innings	0	0
10 wickets in match	0	0
Best bowling	1/7	1/7
Catches/stumpings	7/–	57/1
- Source: Cricinfo, 14 November 2022

Ivan Julian "Jack" Siedle (11 January 1903 – 24 August 1982) was a South African cricketer who played in 18 Test matches from 1927–28 to 1935–36.

== Family background and personal life ==
Born on 11 January 1903 in Berea, Durban, Colony of Natal, Siedle was the youngest son of Otto Siedle, who was born in Woolwich, London of southern German stock and who trained as a watchmaker, subsequently emigrating to Durban where he became prominent in the shipping business and public affairs. Otto Siedle's wife Mary became deputy mayor of Durban. Jack attended Durban Preparatory High School from 1913 to 1918. His older brother Karl Siedle played first-class cricket for Natal before the First World War, in which he was killed; his sister Perla Siedle Gibson became a well-known singer and a symbol of her country during the Second World War.

Siedle married Lesley Maud McPherson on 14 March 1931, with his cricket colleague Eric Dalton as best man. Their son, John Siedle (1932–2008), played a few first-class cricket matches for Natal and Western Province in the mid-1950s.

== Early cricket career ==
A right-hander who played for Natal for 15 seasons from 1922–23 to 1936–37, Jack Siedle bowled occasionally and kept wicket just as infrequently, but his chief value to South Africa was as an opening batsman. He had had no great success when he was picked, in the 1923–24 season, for the match that was the trial for the 1924 tour to England and the 56 he scored in his second innings there was his highest score to that point, as well as the top score for his side, but he was not picked for the tour. For the next couple of seasons that decision was made to look wise as Siedle struggled for runs in the Natal side, not improving his highest score and averaging little over 20 runs per innings. But in the first match of the 1926–27 season for Natal against Border he hit his first century, 114. Two matches on, he did better, sharing a partnership of 424 for the first wicket with John Nicolson against Orange Free State which remains the record for the first wicket for Natal and was the record for the whole of first-class cricket in South Africa until January 2020; Nicolson made an unbeaten 252 but Siedle's dismissal for 174 broke the partnership.

Siedle was in less good form the following year, though he managed a second century against Orange Free State. He was then called up for the third Test at Durban against the touring England team, opening the innings and scoring 11 and 10. That was not enough for him to retain his place for the remaining games of the series. First-class cricket in South Africa in 1928–29 was restricted to a series of matches around Christmas in Durban, but Siedle took advantage of the match against a weak Border team to hit an unbeaten 212, his highest score to that point, and the innings secured his place on the 1929 tour to England.

== Test regular ==
Siedle did well in the early first-class matches of the tour to England: in the second county match of the tour, he hit an unbeaten 169 against Leicestershire, taking more than five hours to reach 100 but then adding a further 69 in little more than an hour. Three weeks later he almost repeated the feat by making 168 against Yorkshire including 20 fours in what Wisden Cricketers' Almanack described as "an admirable innings". After that, however, he was forced to retire ill in the match against the Minor Counties and he then missed six of the next seven tour matches, and they included the first two Tests of the five-match series. He returned to fitness in time to be selected for the third Test, but he was not a success, being dismissed for 0 and 14 as England won the match by five wickets. There was no success for him in the remaining Tests in the series, either: he scored 6 and 1 in the fourth match and another 14 in a single innings in the final game. But away from the Tests, Siedle continued to be a regular and reliable scorer, though there were no more centuries. He ended the tour with 1579 runs, the second highest aggregate after Bruce Mitchell, at an average of 35.88, the second highest average after Herbie Taylor. His overall performance earned praise from Wisden: "Siedle, though a failure in the three Test matches in which he took part, was very consistent otherwise and never looked an easy man of whom to dispose. He watched the ball well and had a nice variety of strokes," it wrote.

Back in South Africa in the 1929–30 season, Siedle hit the highest score of his career in making an unbeaten 265 for Natal in the Currie Cup first-class match against Orange Free State. It was at that time and still remains the second highest innings for Natal, beaten only by Dave Nourse's 304 not out in 1919–20 against Transvaal.

In 1930–31, England toured South Africa, and the Currie Cup was suspended. Siedle made 46 and 38 in Natal's match against the touring side, and that was enough to earn him a place in the team for the first of a five-Test series. The match was won by South Africa by the narrow margin of 28 runs and Siedle, with 13 and 35, had his best Test so far. The second Test was the sixth of Siedle's career and finally he was able to make runs: opening the batting with Bruce Mitchell, he scored 141 out of a first-wicket partnership of 260 that was the highest at the time for South Africa in Tests, and set the team on its way to its then-highest Test total, 513 for eight wickets declared. Mitchell and Herbie Taylor also scored centuries in the innings and England were forced to follow on, though the match ended as a draw. In the rain-hit third Test, Siedle made 38 in South Africa's first innings, surviving while four of his partners were out, but he was dismissed for 0 in the second innings. The fourth Test was a tight match that ended in a draw and Siedle scored 62 in the first innings and 8 in the second. And he made 57 and 30 in the final game of the series, also a draw, which left South Africa with a 1–0 series victory; in this match, with the game petering out to a draw, South Africa bowled its part-time bowlers, and Siedle took the only wicket of his entire first-class career, having the England batsman Maurice Turnbull caught and bowled. In the series as a whole, Siedle scored 384 runs at an average of 42.66; he was the second highest scorer for South Africa after Mitchell.

== Hiatus ==
In 1931–32, South Africa toured Australia and New Zealand. Siedle was initially selected to be vice-captain to Jock Cameron on the tour. In the end, though, he did not go on the tour, and played very little domestic cricket that season in South Africa. He continued to appear fairly regularly for Natal in Currie Cup and other first-class games over the next seasons, but having missed the Australasian tour, there were no other opportunities for Test cricket until 1935, when he was selected against for the tour to England.

== Return to Test cricket ==
Siedle was very much the form player in the first weeks of the South African tour of England in 1935. In May, he made centuries in three consecutive first-class matches, against Surrey, Oxford University and the MCC. In the Surrey game, Siedle was somewhat overshadowed by Dudley Nourse, who hit a century in each innings, but his unbeaten 104 in the second innings and an unbroken partnership of 160 with Nourse set up the declaration from which the South Africans achieved a decisive victory. Nourse was prominent with a first-innings century in the Oxford match as well, but in the second South African innings Siedle shared an opening stand of 164 with Herby Wade and then an unbroken partnership of 205 with Eric Rowan as a high-scoring match petered out to a draw: Siedle's 164 not out was his highest score of the tour. The match against MCC at Lord's was ruined as a contest by rain on the second and third days, but on the first day Siedle had carried his bat for 132 in the South Africans' innings of 297. Wisden reported that "chief honours" in the match went to Siedle and that his innings was "a great feat in view of the previous poor scoring at headquarters". It went on: "Siedle, who batted for nearly five hours without giving anything approaching a chance, never took the slightest risk, but some of his off-side strokes and the square and late cuts were perfectly executed." Siedle did not keep up this rate of scoring and the three centuries in May were his only centuries of the tour, but he continued to make runs through June and was the first member of the touring team to reach 1,000 runs in the season.

In the first Test at Nottingham, he top-scored in South Africa's first innings with 59, though he was quickly out for 2 when South Africa were forced to follow on; the first innings was played on a pitch made awkward by weekend rain and Wisden wrote that he played "with commendable skill and steadiness for about three hours" and "afforded emphatic proof of his strength in defence". But Siedle then had a poor match in the second game of the series, which took place at Lord's and which the South Africans won by 157 runs, their first victory in England ever and, as the only decisive result in the whole series, a series-winning victory; Siedle's contributions were 6 and 13. There were better scores of 33 and 21 in the third Test, which was drawn, but Siedle strained a knee in the match. The knee injury kept him away from cricket for three weeks and that included missing the fourth Test, but he was recovered in time for the final game of the series where he made innings of 35 and 36 in a high-scoring draw that confirmed the series win for South Africa. Injured again, he did not then play in any further first-class fixtures on the tour. His record in the Test series of 205 runs and a batting average of 25.62 put him well down the list of the South African batsmen: sixth in terms of aggregate and eighth in terms of average; on the tour as a whole, however, he made 1346 runs at an average of 39.58.

The South African cricket season immediately following the England tour included a series of five Tests against the Australians, and although the series was won rather easily by Australia and there were many changes in the South African team, Siedle maintained his place in the Test side throughout the season. In the first match, he made 31 and 59, in both innings scoring much faster than his opening partner, Bruce Mitchell, but the match was lost by nine wickets. Innings of 22 and 34 followed in the next game which was drawn, largely through a huge score of 231 by Dudley Nourse. The third Test was a very heavy defeat for the South Africans and Siedle, with scores of 1 and 59, was the top-scorer for this side in the match. The following match was an even heavier defeat and a four-day match was over inside two days: Siedle again top-scored, making 44 in the first innings but 0 in the second. The batting overall was better in the fifth and final match of the series, though the result was still an innings defeat: Siedle scored 36 and 46 in this match; in contrast to his style earlier in the series, and in the second innings of this match, Siedle's first innings took more than two-and-a-half hours and his 36 was scored out of a total of 124. In the series as a whole, Siedle scored 332 runs at an average of 33.20 and was second only to Nourse both in aggregate and average.

Siedle played only one further season of first-class cricket for Transvaal after this and had retired by the time of the next Test series played by the South African team. In the 1936–37 season, his last, he signed off with a score of 207 in his final first-class innings for Natal in the match against Western Province. He died on 24 August 1982 in Bulwer, Natal.
