= Len Wilkinson =

English cricketer (1916–2002)

Personal information
- Full name: Leonard Litton Wilkinson
- Born: 5 November 1916; Northwich, Cheshire, England
- Died: 3 September 2002 (aged 85); Barrow-in-Furness, Cumbria, England
- Batting: Right-handed
- Bowling: Right-arm leg break
- Role: Bowler

International information
- National side: England
- Test debut (cap 306): 24 December 1938 v South Africa
- Last Test: 22 February 1938 v South Africa

Domestic team information
- Years: Team
- 1937–1947: Lancashire
- 1938/39: Marylebone Cricket Club (MCC)

Career statistics
Competition	Tests	FC
Matches	3	77
Runs scored	3	321
Batting average	3.00	7.64
100s/50s	0/0	0/0
Top score	2	48
Balls bowled	573	14,516
Wickets	7	282
Bowling average	38.71	25.25
5 wickets in innings	0	17
10 wickets in match	0	3
Best bowling	2/12	8/53
Catches/stumpings	0/–	53/–
- Source: CricketArchive, 17 December 2008

Leonard Litton Wilkinson (5 November 1916 – 3 September 2002) was an English cricketer who played in 3 Tests from 1938 to 1939. He was a leg spin bowler and played first-class cricket for Lancashire County Cricket Club between 1937 and 1947, although his career was interrupted by the Second World War.

After a remarkable season in 1938, in which he took 151 wickets, Wilkinson was selected for the England team. After 3 Tests, he was dropped. He was less successful on his return to county cricket and after the Second World War only played 3 more first-class matches. He continued to play in local leagues and became a newsagent.

== Early career ==
Originally a seamer, Wilkinson began bowling leg spin at the age of 15. He represented Heaton Cricket Club in the Bolton Cricket League. Wilkinson joined Lancashire in 1936 after trials and give up his job at a cotton mill. He made his debut in 1937 against the touring New Zealanders. In his first over, Wilkinson bowled the New Zealand captain, Curly Page. He played 7 first-class matches in 1937, taking 22 wickets.

== Success and England selection ==
In the 1938 English cricket season, his first and only full season, Wilkinson took 151 wickets in 36 games at an average of 23.28, and earned selection for England's tour of South Africa in 1938-39. In his first eight games of the season, all in May, he took only 16 wickets at an average of about 40. He improved the following month, taking his first hat-trick, a feat he managed against Sussex. He had a remarkable August in which he took 58 wickets from in the last nine games of the season. He managed 11 five wicket hauls and two ten wicket hauls in the season, gaining the notice of the national selectors. Wilkinson was awarded his cap by Lancashire in the same season. Wilkinson was 21 at the time, and only Yorkshire spinner Wilfred Rhodes has managed to take more wickets at a younger age (Rhodes was 20 when he took 154 wickets in 1898).

On the tour, there were three more senior spinners than Wilkinson: Tom Goddard, Hedley Verity, and Doug Wright. Despite this, Wilkinson debuted in the first Test of the series, being chosen ahead of Wright to play against South Africa alongside Verity and Goddard. He was the fifth bowler England used, turned to ahead of Goddard, and finished with match figures of 2/111. Wilkinson did not play the second Test, but played in the third and fourth, finishing with match figures of 4/115 and 1/45 respectively on pitches that were considered perfect for batting. Although the selectors lost confidence in Wilkinson's bowling after he managed seven wickets at 38.71 in Tests, he finished the tour top of the bowling averages with 44 wickets at an average of 18.86.

== Decline ==
After the tour of South Africa, Wilkinson's 1939 season was disappointing. A hand injury prevented him from playing early on in the season. He finished the year with 63 wickets at an average of 30.85, although he did manage career best figures of 8/53 against Hampshire in May 1939. Talking about why he thought he hadn't matched his success from the previous year, Wilkinson said "I don't know why but nothing really went right. The only thing I can think of is that I tried to be too perfect, particularly with the googly. I had an England cap and as an England player I had to be good".

The Second World War prevented Wilkinson from playing first-class cricket until 1946, although he did play for the army. His 1946 season was curtailed after just one match when he injured the cartilage in his knee and had to undergo an operation. He returned to fitness in 1948 but only played two matches, taking a single wicket. He retired from first-class cricket, although continued to play cricket in local leagues. He became a newsagent and died on 3 September 2002. He was married and had two sons.
