= J. C. Collings =

South African cricket umpire

Cricket information
- Role: Umpire

Umpiring information
- Tests umpired: 9 (1931–1936)
- Source: Cricinfo, 5 July 2013

J. C. Collings was a South African cricket umpire. He stood in nine Test matches between 1931 and 1936.

Collings umpired 23 first-class matches between 1928 and 1938. He officiated in the last four Tests of the series between South Africa and England in 1930–31 and all five of the Tests between South Africa and Australia in 1935–36. Aside from some of his Test matches, all the matches he umpired were held in Cape Town.

== See also ==
- List of Test cricket umpires
