= Ronnie Grieveson =

South African cricketer (1909–1998)

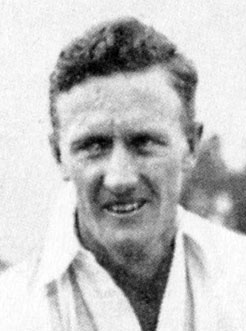

Personal information
- Full name: Ronald Eustace Grieveson
- Born: 24 August 1909; Johannesburg, South Africa
- Died: 24 July 1998 (aged 88); Johannesburg, South Africa
- Batting: Right-handed
- Role: Wicket-keeper

International information
- National side: South Africa
- Test debut: 18 February 1939 v England
- Last Test: 3 March 1939 v England

Career statistics
Competition	Test	First-class
Matches	2	30
Runs scored	114	1130
Batting average	57.00	33.23
100s/50s	0/1	1/7
Top score	75	107*
Catches/stumpings	7/3	25/11
- Source: Cricinfo, 15 November 2022

Ronald Eustace Grieveson OBE (24 August 1909 – 24 July 1998) was a South African cricketer who played in two Tests in 1938–39. He was born and died in Johannesburg, South Africa. He attended Parktown Boys' High School in 1922 and thereafter attended St John's College, Johannesburg from 1923 until 1926 where he matriculated.

== Career ==
As a cricketer, Grieveson was a right-handed middle-order batsman and a wicketkeeper, though he did not always keep wicket for Transvaal, which had the services of Test wicketkeeper Jock Cameron until his death in 1935. Grieveson made his first-class cricket debut in 1929–30 and played for Transvaal intermittently over the next dozen seasons. He hit just one century: an unbeaten 107 against Griqualand West in 1933–34.

In the 1938–39 season, the England touring team won a crushing victory in the third Test, after two drawn games, partly through misfielding by the South Africans; wicketkeeper Billy Wade was singled out for errors that were "particularly expensive". Wade was dropped for the fourth Test and Grieveson was his replacement as wicketkeeper. In a better performance by the South Africans in a rain-affected drawn match, he did not bat, but he took five catches and kept wicket "capably". Grieveson retained his place for the fifth and final Test of the series which, as neither side had a decisive lead in the rubber, was scheduled to be played out to a finish: a so-called "Timeless Test". In the event, the match was the longest ever played and was still left drawn, after the England team had to leave to catch their ship home at the end of the 10th day of play (one day of the 10 had been entirely lost to rain). Grieveson batted in both South African innings, scoring 75 and 39. The 75 was the highest debut score by a wicketkeeper from any Test-playing nation in a Test match to that time. He also took two catches and made three stumpings, and he conceded only eight byes in England's second innings of 654 for five wickets.

The two Test matches represented virtually the end of Grieveson's cricket career: he played one further first-class match in 1939–40, but did not return to first-class cricket after the Second World War. He served in the War, reaching the rank of major and being awarded the OBE.
