= Walter Routledge =

South African cricket umpire

Personal information
- Full name: Walter Goodbrand Routledge
- Born: 28 April 1907
- Died: 1 August 1963 (aged 56)

Umpiring information
- Tests umpired: 2 (1935–1936)
- Source: Cricinfo, 6 June 2019

Walter Routledge (28 April 1907 – 1 August 1963) was a South African cricket umpire. He stood in two Test matches between 1935 and 1936.

== See also ==
- List of Test cricket umpires
