= George Sickler =

South African cricket umpire (1891–1964)

Personal information
- Full name: George Leonard Sickler
- Born: 8 May 1891; Wynberg, Cape Town, Cape Colony
- Died: 26 February 1964 (aged 72); Bellville, South Africa

Umpiring information
- Tests umpired: 7 (1938–1948)
- Source: Cricinfo, 16 July 2013

George Sickler (8 May 1891 – 26 February 1964) was a South African cricket umpire. He stood in seven Test matches between 1938 and 1948.

== See also ==
- List of Test cricket umpires
