= John Siedle =

South African cricketer (1932–2008)

John Roderick Siedle (29 January 1932 – 2 August 2008) was a South African who played first-class cricket for Western Province and Natal between 1955–56 and 1957–58. He was born and died in Durban, KwaZulu Natal, South Africa. He was the son of South African Test cricketer Jack Siedle and nephew to Karl Siedle.

A right-handed middle-order batsman, John Siedle's first-class career began with an innings of 127 for Western Province against Eastern Province on New Year's Day 1956. Though he had limited success after that, he retained his place in the Western Province side for the rest of the 1955–56 season. But there was only a single game in 1956–57 and the following year he turned out for Natal in two first-class matches. In the second of these, his final game, he opened the innings and scored 81 against Orange Free State.
