= Harold Rowe (cricketer) =

Australian cricketer

- Harold Rowe in 1946

Personal information
- Full name: Samuel Harold Drew Rowe
- Born: 5 November 1883; Perth, Western Australia
- Died: 29 October 1968 (aged 84); Perth, Western Australia
- Batting: Right-handed

Domestic team information
- Years: Team
- 1905/06–1929/30: Western Australia

Career statistics
| Competition | First-class |
|---|---|
| Matches | 26 |
| Runs scored | 989 |
| Batting average | 21.04 |
| 100s/50s | 1/5 |
| Top score | 105 |
| Balls bowled | 42 |
| Wickets | 0 |
| Bowling average | – |
| 5 wickets in innings | – |
| 10 wickets in match | – |
| Best bowling | – |
| Catches/stumpings | 21/0 |
- Source: Cricinfo, 7 July 2017

Samuel Harold Drew Rowe (5 November 1883 – 29 October 1968) was one of Western Australia's leading cricketers in the years before Western Australia competed in the Sheffield Shield interstate competition. He was later Western Australia's leading cricket administrator and was instrumental in gaining the state team's entry into the Sheffield Shield in 1947.

== Cricket playing career ==
Harold Rowe captained the cricket team at the High School in Perth. He made his first-class debut for Western Australia against South Australia in the 1905–06 season (Western Australia's fourth first-class match and first victory) and played regularly for the state team until his last match, when he captained the state against the touring MCC in 1929–30 at the age of 45.

In 1907-08 he scored Western Australia's first century against an international team when he made 105 against MCC. He was the first West Australian to captain an Australian team when he led an Australian XI against the MCC in Perth in 1928–29. Playing first for North Perth and later for Claremont, he set a record of 12,045 runs in the WACA competition which still stands.

== Other sports ==
Rowe played 118 games of Australian rules football for West Perth and was a member of their 1905 premiership team. He was also a leading golfer in Western Australia and president of the Western Australian Golf Association.

== Cricket administrative career ==
Rowe went on to become chairman of the Western Australian Cricket Association executive from 1931 to 1946, apart from one year when he was president. He also served as a state selector. As Western Australia's delegate to the Australian Board of Control for International Cricket he was instrumental, through his persuasive and persistent lobbying, in achieving the state's entry into the Sheffield Shield in 1947.

Rowe managed the Australian cricket team that toured South Africa in 1935-36. The team went through the tour undefeated. One of the team members, Jack Fingleton, said there was "no better or more popular manager", and praised Rowe's efforts during the tour, Australia's first full-length tour of South Africa. The captain, Vic Richardson, said of Rowe after the tour, "A more happy choice could not have been made."

Rowe was awarded the King George V Silver Jubilee Medal in 1935 for services to sport. In 2007 he was posthumously inducted into the Western Australian Cricket Association's "Gallery of Greats".

His son Jack was also a prominent cricketer in Perth, and later a state selector and schools coach. Father and son played together for Claremont-Cottesloe in 1929.
