= Otto Siedle =

Otto Siedle (25 May 1856 in Woolwich, UK – 5 April 1948) was a pillar of the community in Durban, South Africa and fathered a family who distinguished themselves in sport, business, music and art in South Africa.

== Ancestry and emigration ==
The name of Siedle is not a common one and the few families with that name throughout the world originate from a family of craftsman-farmers in Southern Germany. There are historical references in the 18th century to Mathaus Siedle and his bell-foundry near Furtwangen, Grand Duchy of Baden. The family had skills in metalwork and clockmaking. There was a major emigration from the Black Forest (Schwarzwald) region in the early 19th century. The exodus of many Siedles was due to the number of sons in the current generation and also due to the state of political upheaval prevailing in that region. The Siedle clan exported their considerable skills. One section of the family settled in Wales and one in London. Ludwig Siedle, Otto's father, was born in Furtwangen. The family farm and metal foundry were near the Bregenbach stream and the property included the Siedlewald nearby. His great-grandfather, Hans Siedle, was the Mayor of Furtwangen. Ludwig emigrated to London, UK and established a jewellery and watchmaking business in Woolwich. Like several other members of the Siedle family, the UK provided a staging post for later emigration to the United States, South Africa, Ceylon and Australia. In 2008, the 257-year-old family firm, SSS Siedle, in Furtwangen, became an electronics company (Ref. 1).

== Life ==
Otto Siedle's life is described in a warm and amusing book "Siedle Saga" [Ref. 2]. He describes memories of Furtwangen as a young boy, schooling in London and early training in Stuttgart as a watchmaker, followed by routine employment in London and participation in amateur and professional music. Then, because the Siedles were friends of Daniel King Junior, son of the founder of the Bullard King line of steamers Otto was hired in 1882 as bookkeeper for their Durban office. He made a success of this job and of many others in the new country. Whilst starting as a shipping agent. handling delivery of coal to the harbours, he became a director of other companies connected with sugar, tea, wool, glass manufacture, hotels, wool washing and milling. He made many appearances on the concert platform as a bass soloist. He met Cecil Rhodes in about 1896 after the Matabele Rebellion; Mahatma Gandhi in industrial negotiations in the 1930s; and George Bernard Shaw, John McCormack and other performers while in charge of the Durban Orchestra. His daughter was the opera star known as "The Lady in White". Two of his sons played first-class cricket: one, Jack Siedle, represented South Africa in 18 Tests between 1927–28 and 1935-36; the other, Karl, played for Natal and was killed in the First World War. Otto Siedle died in Durban in 1945.

== Comments of Others ==
Rupert Ellis Brown, Mayor of Durban, wrote, in a foreword to "Siedle Saga" (Ref. 1) "Eminent citizen; doyen of Durban’s men of affairs; distinguished figure in the shipping, mercantile and industrial interests of our City and Province, Mr Siedle is something more than even these phrases suggest, for I think we might search the annals of Natal in vain for an individual who has been of greater service, of more solid worth, to the community than he. Very largely to his efforts do we owe the development of the artistic and musical amenities of the City of Durban ....his wife, Mrs Mary Siedle, who became Councillor and eventually Deputy Mayor, rendering her term of office historic by the foundation of the Durban Children’s Hospital.....Because Mr Siedle’s autobiography deals with his family as well as himself, and tells us something of their notable contributions to art and music, and not least to sport, the book has been most happily entitled “Siedle Saga”. .... It may well rank as a sequel or addendum to the late George Russell’s “Old Durban”.(Refs 3, 4).".

== Descendants ==
Otto's family are recorded in the above book and in his daughter's autobiography (Ref. 5).

== See also ==
- de:Siedle at German Wikipedia
