= Perla Siedle Gibson =

Perla Siedle Gibson was a South African soprano and artist who became internationally celebrated during the Second World War as the Lady in White, when she sang troopships in and out of Durban harbour.

== Life ==
Gibson was born in Durban in 1888, the daughter of Otto Siedle, a prominent local shipping agent, businessman and musician of German extraction. In the early twentieth century she studied music and art in Europe and the US, and gave recitals in London and New York. Her youngest brother was Jack Siedle, the South African Test cricketer.

During World War 2 Durban was an extremely busy waystation for convoys of ships en route to the fronts in North Africa and the Far East. Gibson became famous among thousands of Allied troops when she serenaded them as their ships passed in and out.

One account of the origin for Gibson's custom was that it arose when she was seeing off a young Irish seaman her family had entertained the day before. As his ship was departing he was said to have called across the water asking her to sing something Irish, and Gibson responded with a rendition of "When Irish Eyes are Smiling". She decided to sing to every ship connected with the war which entered or left the harbour. Over the following years she went on to sing to more than 5,000 ships and a total of about a quarter of a million Allied servicemen. Clad in white with a red hat, she would stand at a spot at the mouth of Durban Bay where ships entering and leaving the harbour pass quite close, and sing patriotic and sentimental songs through a megaphone from a torpedoed ship, which grateful British soldiers had given her.

Soldiers' talk led to the fame of the Lady in White spreading around the world. A British army newspaper called Parade, dated 3 March 1945, described Gibson as a highlight of troops' visits to Durban:

As the crowded ships passed into the harbour, men lining the landward rails saw a woman, dressed in white, singing powerfully through a megaphone such songs as "There'll Always be an England!" and "Land of Hope and Glory." A well-known local figure, she would drive down from her home on the Berea as soon as she could see that the ships were moving in.

Gibson was married to Air Sergeant Jack Gibson, who served in Italy, and had two sons and a daughter in the military. She had sung all their ships goodbye as they left for the war. She even sang on the day she received news that her son Roy had been killed in the fighting in Italy.

She died in 1971, shortly before her 83rd birthday. The year later a bronze plaque donated by men of the Royal Navy was erected to her memory on Durban's North Pier on the spot where she used to sing.

== Commemoration ==
Thanks to Sam Morley’s interest in Perla Gibson’s unique story, there is a bronze statue of Perla at the Maritime Museum in Durban. He instigated a public fund-raising project and Perla’s niece and fellow artist, Barbara Siedle, was commissioned to execute the artwork.

The Queen visited Durban in March 1995, and viewed the statue on 24 March. The exact wording on the plinth reads: “Prior to its unveiling on August 15th 1995, this monument was placed alongside HMS “Britannia” in Durban Harbour, to be viewed by Her Majesty Queen Elizabeth II and H.R.H. the Duke of Edinburgh during their State Visit to Durban on 24 March 1995.” The name of the vessel should read "HMY Britannia".

On 15 August 1995, VJ day, the statue was officially unveiled by Perla’s two surviving children Joy Liddiard and Barrie Gibson on T jetty next to the Portnet offices.

The statue of Perla Gibson was re-located to the Port Natal / Durban Maritime Museum on 27 September 2016.

== Bibliography ==
- Berman, E: Art & Artists of South Africa. Southern Book Publishers, 1994.
