= Robert Williams (South African cricketer) =

South African cricketer (1912–1984)

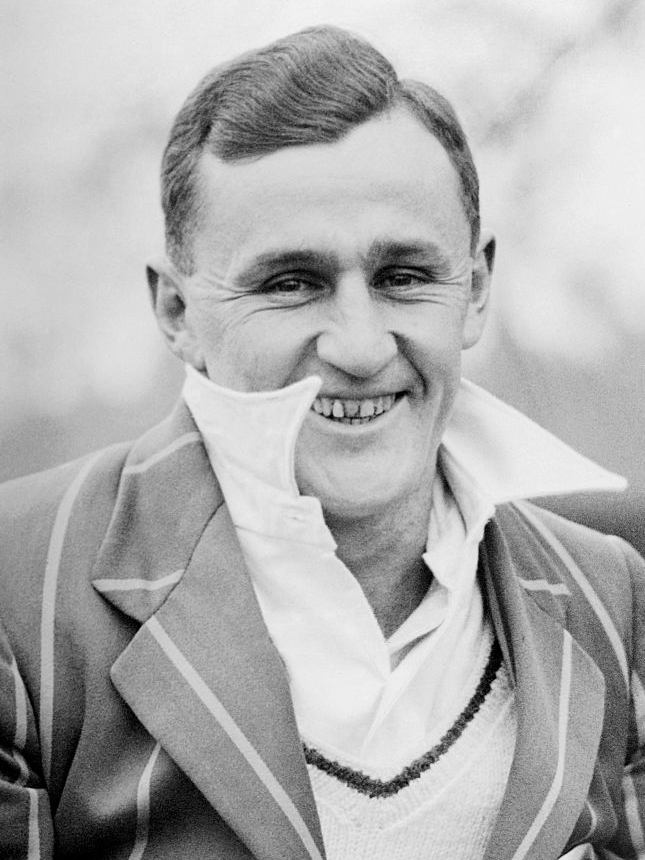

Personal information
- Full name: Robert James Williams
- Born: 12 April 1912; Viljoen’s Drift, Orange Free State, South Africa
- Died: 14 May 1984 (aged 72); Durban, Natal, South Africa
- Batting: Right-handed
- Role: Wicket-keeper

Domestic team information
- Years: Team
- 1930–31 to 1950–51: Natal

Career statistics
Competition	First-class
Matches	53
Runs scored	1156
Batting average	22.23
100s/50s	1/3
Top score	117*
Balls bowled	0
Wickets	–
Bowling average	–
5 wickets in innings	–
10 wickets in match	–
Best bowling	–
Catches/stumpings	77/55
- Source: Cricinfo, 5 August 2016

Robert James Williams (12 April 1912 – 14 May 1984) was a South African cricketer who played first-class cricket for Natal between 1930–31 and 1950–51 and was Jock Cameron's deputy wicketkeeper on the 1935 South African tour of England, though he did not play in any Tests.
