= Billy Wade (cricketer) =

South African cricketer (1914–2003)

Cricket information
- Batting: Right-handed

International information
- National side: South Africa
- Test debut: 24 December 1938 v England
- Last Test: 20 January 1950 v Australia

Career statistics
Competition	Test	First-class
Matches	11	46
Runs scored	511	2859
Batting average	28.38	48.45
100s/50s	1/3	8/13
Top score	125	208
Catches/stumpings	15/2	52/26
- Source: Cricinfo

Walter Wareham Wade (18 June 1914 – 31 May 2003), known as Billy Wade, was a South African cricketer who played in 11 Test matches between 1938 and 1950. He attended Hilton College along with his brother, Herby, who also played test cricket for South Africa.
