= Herby Wade =

South African cricketer

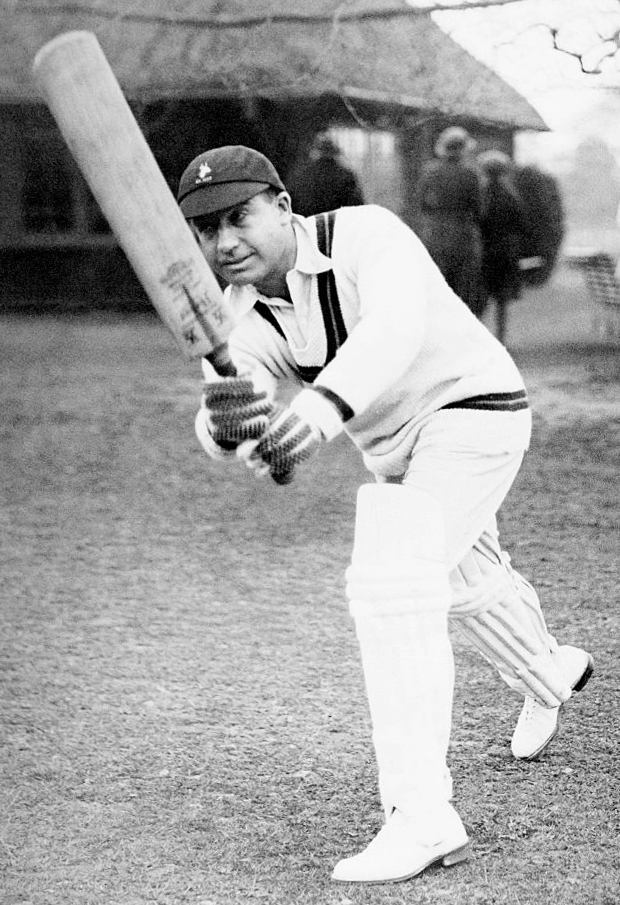
- Wade pictured in about 1935

Personal information
- Born: 14 September 1905; Durban, Colony of Natal
- Died: 23 November 1980 (aged 75); Inanda, Johannesburg, South Africa
- Batting: Right-handed

International information
- National side: South Africa
- Test debut: 15 June 1935 v England
- Last Test: 28 February 1936 v Australia

Career statistics
Competition	Test	First-class
Matches	10	74
Runs scored	327	3,858
Batting average	20.43	35.39
100s/50s	0/0	9/18
Top score	40*	190
Catches/stumpings	4/–	50/–
- Source: Cricinfo, 14 November 2022

Herbert Frederick Wade (14 September 1905 – 23 November 1980) was a South African cricketer who played in 10 Test matches in 1935 and 1935–36.

A middle-order batsman, Wade captained South Africa in every Test that he played in, including the series in England in 1935 that South Africa won 1–0 with four Tests drawn.

After leaving Hilton College, where he was a contemporary of his predecessor as South Africa's captain, Jock Cameron, Wade played for Natal from 1924–25 to 1936–37, with a top score of 190 against Eastern Province in his second-last game. He captained the side from 1930–31 until his retirement, and in his career he was captain in 61 of his 74 first-class matches.

His younger brother Billy also played Test cricket for South Africa after Herby retired.
